= List of Doug characters =

This is a list of characters from the Nickelodeon/Disney animated television series Doug.

== Main characters ==
- Douglas Yancey "Doug" Funnie (voiced by Billy West in the Nickelodeon series and by Thomas Lyons, credited as Thomas McHugh, in the Disney series) is depicted as an unlucky, average, self-conscious, naïve, and occasionally sensitive 11-(later 12)-year-old boy who wants to fit in with the crowd, but is very creative and imaginative, and has a strong sense of right and wrong, making him more likely to stand out. He has a talent for writing and he plays a banjo in his spare time. Doug narrates every episode, and writes his experiences in his journal. His alter ego, Quailman, was inspired by Jinkins' and Roberts' home movies as children, posing as superheroes. Billy West, the original voice behind Doug, was assigned by executive Vanessa Coffey, to Jinkins' initial reluctance. Despite this, he would come to view it as the best possible voice for the character. West, in recording lines for Doug, noted that "There's a lot of me in there, because I'm going through my own experiences in there, because I have a conscience."
  - Quailman is Doug's superhero alter ego, harnesses the powers of the quail. Often accompanied by his sidekick, Quaildog (Porkchop).
  - Smash Adams is another alter ego of Doug's, a British spy agent parodying James Bond.
  - Race Canyon is a seldom-seen alter ego, an adventurous archaeologist parodying Indiana Jones. Doug dresses as him for Halloween in "Doug's Halloween Adventure".
- Porkchop (voiced by Fred Newman) is Doug's anthropomorphic 4-(later 5)-year-old pet dog and sidekick who accompanies him nearly everywhere he goes. He sometimes assists Doug in making decisions and acts as his conscience. He is also very talented in many things such as acting. He lives in an igloo-shaped doghouse in the Nickelodeon series, and a tipi in the Disney series. During a Christmas special it shown that Doug got Porkchop as a Christmas gift and that Porkchop once saved Beebe Bluff's life when she was about to fall through some thin ice. Porkchop, along with Doug, originally first appeared in ID spots for the USA children's block, USA Cartoon Express.
- Mosquito "Skeeter" Valentine (voiced by Fred Newman) is Doug's blue-skinned best friend. He is part of Doug's main circle of friends in both the Nickelodeon and Disney series. He is famous in both series for the honking sounds he frequently makes. As Skeeter and his family have lived in Bluffington for some time, he initially helps Doug order food from the popular Bluffington restaurant Honker Burger in the series premiere (resulting in their friendship), and later helps Doug learn how to dance. He and Doug are fans of the rock group The Beets (based on The Beatles, The Who, and The Rolling Stones). Skeeter also occasionally works as a DJ. Although he is at best an average student, he is highly intelligent – he once got a perfect score on an IQ test, leading him to contemplate leaving elementary school for college (for which Doug resented him, until Skeeter decided not to go, since his would-be college classmates smoked and disdained things like air guitar). The character was based on Jinkins' high school best friend, Tommy Roberts.
- Patricia "Patti" Mayonnaise (voiced by Constance Shulman) is Doug's orange-skinned love interest and closest female friend. She is another character part of Doug's main circle of friends. Patti is a star athlete with a Southern drawl, multiple talents and popular with her classmates. She is usually kind and helpful towards others but is not without her faults, namely a tendency to be very competitive, being gullible, and to get easily angered if pushed too far. Jinkins based the character on his adolescent crush from junior high to high school, and culled her name from two girls from his childhood, Pam Mayo and a girl named Patty. Her mother died when she was a little girl in a car accident that left her father paralyzed from the waist down. In the final episode she asked Doug out on a "date date". In the early 1990s, Shulman appeared in a series of Kraft mayonnaise commercials.
- Roger M. Klotz (voiced by Billy West in the Nickelodeon seasons and by Chris Phillips in the Disney seasons) is Doug's green-skinned archrival and the town's local school bully and thug. He is a source of anxiety for Doug and his friends. He's older than others in his class, as it took him three years to graduate from sixth grade. Roger and his divorced mother lived in a trailer park in the Nickelodeon series; in the Disney series, Roger's family becomes wealthy from a real-estate deal struck between the owner of the trailer park and the Bluff family. Roger's character was based on a real bully who lived in the same neighborhood as Jinkins. He adopted the bully's neighbors' last name, Klotz, for the character. In "Doug's Worst Nightmare" it is revealed that Roger has a crush on Judy. He tries to skate, learn Shakespeare (with misplaced words and malapropisms) and plays music to win her love. After he is rebuffed, he moves on as he saw that she wasn't really what he wanted. In "Doug's in Debt" after Judy takes her Napoleon hat back from him he says smiling, "she sure is forceful" hinting he still loves her. In "Doug Gets Booked" she even kisses him. Roger secretly takes ballet lessons and hopes to have his own gas station someday. He has also expressed interest at purchasing his own cow. Roger successfully put together a garage band in "Doug's No Dummy" called "Roger and the Ulcers". Roger is occasionally shown to not be as tough as he lets on – he is afraid of snakes, which Doug briefly contemplates using against him as payback for his bullying, and he is left virtually speechless in the episode "Doug Throws a Party" when Connie punches him in the gut and calls him a big baby when he teases her about her bad haircut. The relationship between Doug and Roger in the Disney series becomes more similar to that of Bart Simpson and Nelson Muntz from The Simpsons: Roger, though still continuing his role as the school bully and thug, becomes less antagonistic towards Doug and acts as more of friend towards him (even to the point where he actually replaces Connie in Doug's main circle of friends, though that was likely a writer choice more than a character choice), although Roger is still prone to bullying him and, when doing so, is shown to be more prone to ridicule and verbal humiliation rather than obnoxious pranks. Roger's pet is a magenta-furred cat with a white muzzle named Stinky, who follows him around almost everywhere Roger goes and the cat seems to be the counterpart to Porkchop as Roger is to Doug—well, Roger is Doug's bully anyway; and Roger's pet being a cat may be to shadow the fact that Doug's pet is a dog. Roger is somewhat of a stereotype of a school bully and thug to Doug since he will only address Doug by last name.
- Beebe Bluff (voiced by Alice Playten) is the stereotypically spoiled heiress to the Bluff family fortune and one of Doug's friends. She is also part of Doug's main circle of friends. Beebe is the daughter of Bill Bluff, the richest man in the town and a friend of Mayor White. The Bluff family is the namesake of the town of Bluffington, and in the second series, the school is even named after Beebe. Despite a certain air of superiority over her peers, Beebe maintains friendships with Patti Mayonnaise and most of her other contemporaries. Doug had his first kiss with her in the episode Doug's Secret Admirer, although it was out of gratitude rather than love, since she already has a crush on Skeeter.
- Judith Anastasia "Judy" Funnie (voiced by Becca Lish) is Doug's older sister and the extrovert of the family, she is obsessed with the works of William Shakespeare, and is an aspiring actress and artist who attends a special art school for gifted individuals. She is embarrassed by how "boring" her family is compared to her friends and classmates. She and Doug have normal bouts of sibling rivalry, but usually put it aside whenever faced with a problem and deeply respect each other. She affectionately calls her brother, "Dougie." She is a beatnik that is always seen wearing a beret and dark glasses. Judy was inspired in name from Jinkins' first girlfriend, and in appearance from his wife's sisters. In recording her character, Lish would provide lines as written, and then provide several more takes incorporating improvisation into her lines. She is Roger's love interest although she does not return it and rebuffs his affections with an eloquent Shakespearean poem. However, she actually kisses him in "Doug Gets Booked" implying she has romantic feelings for him after all.

== Recurring characters ==
- Chalky Studebaker (voiced by Doug Preis) is a friendly and helpful school jock with light green skin, who is part of Doug's main circle of friends in both series. Chalky wants to follow the footsteps of his older brother, Cliff, whom he is often compared to. He comes from a family to whom winning "just comes naturally". This can put him under pressure at times along with his extremely busy extracurricular schedule.
- Connie Benge (voiced by Becca Lish) is a sweet and naïve schoolgirl who is Patti's best friend, Beebe's closest friend, and also one of Doug's friends. In the former series, Connie was shown to have a small crush on Doug, although he does not return any of her feelings, and only considers her a friend. This relationship with him remains in the Disney series, though she also tries to develop a similar relationship with Roger. Although she was rather heavy-set in the first series, she lost weight between the two series, grew taller than both Patti and Beebe, and got a new wardrobe and hairstyle after visiting a beauty farm, making her look quite different in either show. During the first season on Nickelodeon, she had purple skin and blond hair, and was never mentioned by name until the second season, when she was changed to have pea-green skin and dark-blue hair.
- Bud Dink (voiced by Fred Newman) is a slightly eccentric, purple-skinned, dimwitted writer who lives next door to the Funnies with his wife and foil, Tippy. Doug frequently goes to Mr. Dink for advice, but sometimes it is useless. He also tends to purchase things that are "very expensive". His and his wife's last name comes from an acronym: Dual Income, No Kids.
- Tippy Dink (voiced by Doris Belack) is the deadpan but intelligent and always well meaning wife of Bud Dink. In later Nickelodeon episodes, Mrs. Dink becomes mayor of Bluffington, a role she continues in the Disney version.
- Theda Funnie (voiced by Becca Lish) is Doug, Judy, and Dirtbike's mother, generally portrayed as a housewife, but sometimes a working mother too. She manages the Deja Vu Recycling Center. Her skin is slightly brighter than Doug's, her hair is blue, and is shown to be rather meek, but also an outgoing environmentalist.
- Phil Funnie (voiced by Doug Preis) is Doug, Judy, and Dirtbike's father who works as a photographer for the Busy Beaver department store. He quit to start his own studio toward the end of the Nickelodeon series, but then decided to go back to his old job because running his own business was too stressful and took time away from the family. His personality is friendly, outgoing, and sometimes clumsy. His skin has a hint of orange, and he can be seen giving Doug advice, most of which is relatively useless. He is shown to be a very skilled kite maker.
- Al and Moo Sleech (both voiced by Eddie Korbich) are stereotypical nerdy twin brothers. They are also friends with Doug and Skeeter. Doug looks to them for technical help whenever he needs it. In the Disney series, they skip all of the middle school grades and end up going to a high school, but their relationship with Doug and others are still intact. They are each shown to have a crush on Judy. The two try to hide the fact that their father is not as intelligent as them and is a hardworking doughnut baker. On occasion, they speak to each other using only numbers as a form of cryptophasia.
- Willie White (voiced by Doug Preis) is one of Roger's three main sidekicks and the son of former mayor Bob White. He is somewhat dumb and dimwitted. Willie is not much of a bully and a thug, and unlike Roger and the rest of his posse, is friends with Doug. He runs against Doug for class treasurer in "Doug Runs", although neither are elected after getting carried away with unrealistic promises.
- Ned Cauphee (voiced by Fred Newman) is one of Roger's three main sidekicks. He is the smartest and most vocal member of Roger's gang. He has ten brothers and twin sisters. Ned's most unusual feature among most characters is that he has two different-looking eyes.
- Boomer Bledsoe (voiced by Billy West in the Nickelodeon series and by Chris Phillips in the Disney series) is one of Roger's three main sidekicks. Despite being a bully and a thug, Boomer is shown to be noticeably nicer toward Doug and other characters than his gang friends are. He once got blamed for making a funny doodle of Mrs. Wingo, even though it was Doug that did it.
- Lamar Bone (voiced by Doug Preis): Assistant/vice-principal Lamar Bone is the stereotypical "mean principal" of Doug's schools, and is one of Doug's antagonists. Mr. Bone is generally uptight and serious about his job, he is bossy, corrupt, he has a bad-temper, and commonly threatens to put even the smallest mistakes on permanent records. During one episode, after having surgery to remove a wart, he remembered his youth and began playing pranks on teachers and students. In his personal life, he enjoys yodeling and clog dancing which have earned him many accolades and trophies, some of which he kept at Bluffington Elementary. Mr. Bone's speech and appearance are akin to that of Don Knotts. He has a nephew named Percy Femur who visits on occasion, who turns out to be a much more aggressive bully and thug than Roger. Despite his strictness and meanness, however, he can be reasoned with (for example, when he refused to allow the students' favorite band, The Beets, to play a free concert at the school, he changed his mind when the students agreed to allow his yodeling group to do the opening act).
- Mrs. Wingo (voiced by Doris Belack) is Doug's elementary school teacher. Although a generally nice teacher, she is also shown to be stern at certain times. In the Disney series, she only appears in the final episode.
- Cleopatra "Dirtbike" Funnie (voiced by Fred Newman) is Doug's baby sister, appearing only in the Disney series. She debuts in the episode "Doug's Secret Christmas". She gets her name from Judy snatching Doug's Christmas list and making fun of the names listed on it and then sarcastically making relevant suggestions, one of them Cleopatra. In the end, Theda, who had been present at the time, says that she took a name suggestion from each of them.
- Stinky (voiced by Fred Newman) is Roger's magenta anthropomorphic cat. Stinky, first and foremost, loves her owner, Roger Klotz. Briefly, Judy Funnie develops a liking for Stinky in the episode "Doug's Fat Cat". That episode also reveals that Stinky is a girl after she gives birth to three kittens. She despises Doug's dog, Porkchop, and the two usually do not get along (although Porkchop was seen at the end of "Doug's Fat Cat" playing with Stinky's kittens). Stinky accompanies Roger frequently in the Nickelodeon series, but is less prominently featured in the Disney series.
- Principal Buttsavitch is an unseen character mentioned throughout the series, mostly by Assistant/vice-principal Bone who assumes the disciplinary duties of the principal who is, as explained by Mr. Bone, to be extremely busy. The character is male, but remains unseen and not heard by the audience, as well as most of the characters throughout the series. The last episode of the 91-94 Nickelodeon series features a plot device where Doug skips out on his graduation ceremony in order to find Principal Buttsavitch. Doug misses his chance due to the principal attending the very ceremony Doug did not attend. The character is named after the series creator Jim Jinkins's elementary school principal.
- Bob White (voiced by Greg Lee, impersonating George H. W. Bush) is the scatterbrained yet happy-go-lucky mayor of Bluffington for most of the Nickelodeon series and principal of Beebe Bluff Middle School in the Disney series; a stereotypical fast talking, slick politician. He is best known for his campaign slogan "Vote for me!" He is eventually voted out of his mayor's position late in the Nickelodeon series in favor of Tippy Dink (partly because he wasted all his campaign time on attempting to get his son Willie elected class treasurer), after which he takes the role of middle school principal (and Bone's superior) in the Disney series, a role he uses (somewhat unethically) to campaign for his old office back.
- William Hornblower Bluff III (voiced by Doug Preis) is Beebe's father, the richest man in Bluffington, and the descendant of Bluffington's founder. His company, BluffCo, is the towns largest factory and employer. He is portrayed as a stereotypical tycoon with a haughty southern accent. He is fairly close with former Mayor White, suggesting that Bluff uses White as a pawn through lucrative campaign contributions. His relation with Doug seems to be vary, sometimes refusing him access to his land when Doug is convinced he has found dinosaur bones; other times being supportive when Doug has been granted a work study at BluffCo, and even acting as a mentor to Doug in business careers. In Doug's 1st Movie, he serves as the film's main antagonist.
- Walter "Skunky" Beaumont (voiced by Doug Preis) is a typical slacker surfer dude, with a voice that is reminiscent of the Fast Times At Ridgemont High character Jeff Spicoli. In the Nickelodeon series, he was commonly mentioned but never seen, however heard in the episode "Doug Didn't Do It". He becomes a regular character in the Disney series.
- Fentruck Stimmel (voiced by Fred Newman) is a foreign exchange student from Yakistonia. While he is first introduced in Doug Meets Fentruck, he is a minor character in the Nick series. In the Disney series however, he becomes much more prominent as a character. He is friends with Doug and the rest of the group.
- Larry (voiced by Alan J. Higgins and Alice Playten in "Doug Rocks the House" and by Chris Phillips in the Disney series) is a schoolkid who is a member of the A. V. Club. In the first season of the Nickelodeon series, he has green skin; while he has pink skin in subsequent seasons of both series. In the Disney series, Larry appears as part of the Beebe Bluff Middle School paper staff, rather than still being in the A. V. Club.
- Brian (voiced by Phil Proctor) is a yellow-skinned schoolkid with orange hair. He is an A. V. Club member.
- Percy Femur (voiced by Billy West) is Lamar Bone's nephew and Doug's bully and thug, who first appeared in "Doug Saves Roger". When he first met Roger, he was his school bully and thug; proving to be more mean than obnoxious (like Roger), but can be easily tricked as he was seen again in "Doug's Big Feat". In the Disney version, he was only seen in "Doug's Hoop Nightmare".
- Guy Graham (voiced by Guy Hadley) is a purple-skinned 8th grader appearing only in the Disney series, a very handsome but rather selfish and inconsiderate kid. He is editor-in-chief for the school newspaper and is both Doug's boss and his rival for Patti's love (though Guy doesn't know about Doug's crush on her). He is usually nice to Doug compared to Roger, who ironically Guy thinks is the loser. In Doug's Quailman fantasies, he has the villain identities of Golden Salmon, Rupert Schmupert, Lord of the Polka, and an unnamed space slug. He was named after his own actor.
- Joe Valentine (voiced by Billy West in the Nickelodeon series and by Fred Newman in the Disney series) is Skeeter's father. He had a tendency to have short-term memory loss. He also has a foul temper, normally trying to count on himself, but he always skips to 10 after getting to 2, and normally turning beet red when angered (Mostly at Doug and Skeeter).
- Ruby Valentine (voiced by Doris Belack & Alice Playten) is Skeeter's mother. Unlike her husband, she is calm and even tempered.
- Dale Valentine (voiced by Fred Newman) is Skeeter's toddler brother, who looks like a smaller version of him. His first words were "cool" (which he said twelve times at his preschool) and "man" (which he said six times), and his first full sentence was "Hiya, Big Nose," which he said to Doug when he first met him. He has appeared in several episodes, usually causing all sorts of trouble to Doug, Skeeter, or both of them. He is a very precocious toddler, but nonetheless lovable to those who meet him.
- Coach Spitz (voiced by Billy West in the Nickelodeon series and by Jeff Bergman in the Disney series) is Doug's sexist, super meany-head, incompetent, and lazy baseball and football coach. He has no tolerance for anyone who is not strong, or cannot squeeze the guts out of vegetables. He spends very little of doing his job as a coach which causes problems. He assumes his players are born good athletes and doesn't bother to coach them to improve their skills. He seems to worry more about the players than about his experience on how to coach.
- Mr. Swirly (voiced by Bruce Bayley Johnson) is the owner of Swirly's Ice Cream. He seems to be unsure what to do in dire situations, although other times he did take charge. When Doug admitted that candy bars he was selling for his scout troop were substandard and Mr. Swirly realized they were made by his own company, he got to the root of the problem immediately. In the Disney series, he had a more prominent role as the owner of a new Swirly's restaurant that immediately became the new hangout for Doug and his friends.
- Emily Kristal (voiced by Fran Brill) is Doug's permanent teacher for middle school, appearing only in the Disney series. She has a friendly, understanding manner, and tends to get highly into whatever book she reads to the class. In the final season, she becomes the new girlfriend of Patti's father Chad, much to Patti's anger and frustration, but eventually learns how to deal with it, as Emily and Chad are married in the Disney series finale.
- Loretta Lequigly (voiced by Fran Brill) is a minor character in the last two seasons of the Nickelodeon series, on whom Skeeter develops a crush. A transfer student whose family hails from Yakestonia, she is introduced in the episode Doug and the Little Liar, in which she puts up false pretenses to get Skeeter to like her (including claiming to be fluent in Yakestonian when in reality she can speak only a few key phrases). Loretta does not appear in the Disney series although she is mentioned by Patti in one episode.
- The Beets are a popular band from Liverpool, inspired by Jinkins' favorite bands growing up, The Beatles, The Who and Led Zeppelin. The band breaks up in the Disney series, in a break-up similar to The Beatles.
  - Monroe Yoder (voiced by Doug Preis) is the bassist and singer of the band. He is noted for the bandana that he is usually wearing and his striking resemblance to John Lennon, as well as shades of Roger Daltrey.
  - Clyde "Chap" Lipman (voiced by Doug Preis) is the drummer and leader of the band. Similar to Monroe resembling Lennon, Lipman resembles his Beatles counterpart, Ringo Starr.
  - Wendy Nespah (voiced by Becca Lish) is the keyboard/keytar player and the only female member of the group. Following the band's break-up, she goes to college in order to learn how to read contracts and ultimately moves into a mansion, with Monroe as her butler. Nespah is bald with a prominent golden earring. It is likely her surname comes from the French phrase "n'est-ce pas." She loosely resembles Eurythmics frontwoman Annie Lennox.
  - Flounder is the lead guitarist of the band. Following the band's break-up, he later becomes the judge of a rock-and-roll star song contest and reveals to Connie, who nearly won before losing to Skeeter, Al, and Moo's accidental song Monster Call, that quitting school, just like she intended to do and like he did, got the band into trouble. Later afterwards, he attempts to start a new band and searches for talent, ultimately working with Judy briefly. Flounder resembles Peter Tork of The Monkees.
- Chad Mayonnaise (voiced by Doug Preis) is Patti's father. He is a kind, charismatic man, bound in a wheelchair following the same accident that killed Patti's mother. He and Patti are very close, and he is also friendly to Doug. He is one of the more levelheaded adults in town. After working at a different job in the Nickelodeon series, he becomes a history teacher in the Disney series. He eventually gets remarried to Ms. Kristal.
- Todd Bentley (voiced by Melissa Greenspan) is a second grader who idolized and follows Doug everywhere he goes after watching Doug performing a magic trick. He later returns in the Disney series as a fellow Bluffscout and gets added into Doug's team, much to Doug's dismay..
