= List of Doug episodes =

Doug is an American animated television series created by Jim Jinkins and produced by Jumbo Pictures. The series premiered on Nickelodeon in 1991, and ran until 1994. Nickelodeon declined to green-light a fifth season, and it was instead ordered by Disney. Disney also acquired the production company behind Doug, Jumbo Pictures. The fifth season premiered in 1996 and became a staple of ABC's Saturday morning block. The series continued for two more seasons and a film until 1999.

For the first four seasons (52 episodes), Doug episodes consisted of two stories per half-hour, with the exceptions of "Doug Bags a Neematoad", "Doug's Halloween Adventure" and "Doug's Christmas Story" as they were full-length. The fifth through seventh seasons (65 episodes) consisted of one story per half-hour.

A total of 117 episodes (166 segments) were produced over the course of seven seasons.

== Series overview ==
Season	Segments	Episodes		Originally released		
Season	Segments	Episodes		First released	Last released	Network
1	25	13		August 11, 1991	December 8, 1991	Nickelodeon
2	26	13		September 13, 1992	December 6, 1992	Nickelodeon
3	26	13		April 11, 1993	July 11, 1993	Nickelodeon
4	24	13		September 26, 1993	January 2, 1994	Nickelodeon
5	—N/a	26		September 7, 1996	March 22, 1997	ABC
6	—N/a	8		September 13, 1997	November 22, 1997	ABC
7	—N/a	31	8	September 12, 1998	March 20, 1999	ABC
7	—N/a	31	23	October 19, 1998	April 12, 1999	Syndication
Film				March 26, 1999		—N/a

== Episodes ==
=== Nickelodeon seasons (1991–94) ===
==== Season 1 (1991) ====
In the closing credits for this season, two different pieces of music would play: the first piece would be taken from the second story in the episode, and near the end of the sequence, Porkchop, Doug's dog, would don headphones and listen to music from the first story, immediately drowning out the original background music and angering Doug.

Unlike the other seasons, the Jumbo Pictures closing logo is different. It is still and takes place on a dark blue background.

No. overall	No. in season	Title (Note: Alternate titles are sourced from an archived Nickelodeon episode guide, iTunes, and Paramount+.)	Directed by	Written by	Original release date	Prod. code
1	1	"Doug Can't Dance"	Tony Eastman & Carol Millican	Joe Aaron & Ken Scarborough	August 11, 1991	002
1	1	"Doug Gets Busted"	Ken Kimmelman	Ken Scarborough	August 11, 1991	002
Doug is excited about going to his first school costume dance, and having the opportunity to dance with his dream girl, Patti. But Doug's excitement soon fades when Roger reminds him that he has no dancing talent, so Doug goes to Skeeter for dancing tips. Note: This episode was originally made in late 1990 as the series pilot, but new animations scenes were made to extend its runtime for the TV cut. Doug makes a model of a volcano for a science project. When rumor has it that the volcano erupted and caused the whole science room to explode, Doug decides to disguise himself as Jack Bandit and go on the lam to avoid the cops and getting in trouble.
2	2	"Doug Bags a Neematoad"	Howard Beckerman & Yvette Kaplan	Alicia Marie Schudt	August 18, 1991	001
The Funnies have moved from Bloatsburg and are just arriving at their new home in the town of Bluffington. 11-year-old Doug Funnie writes his thoughts in his journal and worries he will not be able to make any friends. On a search to find food for his Mom (Theda), Dad (Phil), sister (Judy), and himself, Doug meets his next door neighbor Mr. Dink. He shows Doug a video about Bluffington and introduces him to the popular hangout fast food restaurant called The Honker Burger. When Doug gets to the hangout, he meets Skeeter Valentine who befriends him right away. Doug also meets Patti Mayonnaise and, right away, has a secret crush on her. However, all is not well when he also meets the local bully Roger Klotz who tricks Doug into believing he has to catch a monster called a Neematoad at Stinsen's Pond to be a town hero. Note: Chronologically, this is the series premiere, but it aired as the second episode. This explains why Doug's family moved in this episode, when they already moved into Bluffington in the first episode.
3	3	"Doug's Dog's Date"	Johan Edstrom	Betty G. Birney	August 25, 1991	003
3	3	"Doug's Big Nose"	John Paratore	M.K. Brown	August 25, 1991	003
When Porkchop begins acting very strangely, Doug tries to find out what's causing his friend's odd behavior. It turns out that Porkchop has come down with a case of "puppy love" for a local poodle. Doug refuses to get his picture taken for School Photo Swap Day at school, because he has suddenly become self-conscious of his nose after Skeeter's little brother Dale calls Doug "big nose".
4	4	"Doug Takes a Hike"	Carol Millican	Ken Scarborough	September 8, 1991	004
4	4	"Doug Rocks"	Ken Kimmelman	Alan Silberberg	September 8, 1991	004
Doug joins the Bluff Scouts and, on his first camping trip with the scouts, he really wants to get his first badge. But when Roger "volunteers" to be Doug's camping partner, he's not sure how the camping trip will turn out. Skeeter and Doug win tickets to go see The Beets live at a concert in Bluffington. Unfortunately, everything comes to a halt when Skeeter gets grounded and can't go with Doug to the concert. Doug really wants to go, but sticks with his best friend. Skeeter gets ungrounded by his father since he was making noise, and they go outside. On the night of the concert the two are at the Honker Burger, when they get the surprise of their lives.
5	5	"Doug Can't Dig It"	Yvette Kaplan	Ken Scarborough	September 22, 1991	005
5	5	"Doug Didn't Do It"	Jean-Pierre Jacquet	Marcy Winograd & Jacqueline Hirtz	September 22, 1991	005
Doug is thrilled when Mrs. Wingo tells him that he'll be introducing a special performer for an upcoming school show. But when he finds out that the performer is actually his sister Judy, he worries that he'll be embarrassed in front of the entire school. A prankster steals Vice Principal Bone's "Der Grosser Yodelmeister" trophy. When the trophy is later found in Doug's locker, Mr. Bone becomes convinced that Doug is the thief.
6	6	"Doug, Mayor for a Day"	John Paratore	John Pardee & Joey Murphy	September 29, 1991	006
6	6	"Doug's No Dummy"	Johan Edstrom	Alan Kingsberg	September 29, 1991	006
For Student Government Day, Doug is chosen to be the mayor for the day. He visits Mayor Robert "Bob" White on a field trip to Bluffington Town Hall, and makes a big decision in the position when a situation erupts at Mr. Swirly's Ice Cream factory. Doug is entered (thanks to Roger) into a school talent contest, and decides to try out a ventriloquism act. Once onstage, Doug has to face his nerves and keep his new pal Buster from losing his head.
7	7	"Doug's Cool Shoes"	Ken Kimmelman	Marcy Winograd & Jacqueline Hirtz	October 6, 1991	007B
7	7	"Doug to the Rescue"	Carol Millican	Alan Silberberg	October 6, 1991	007A
Doug feels inferior because he doesn't have awesome new shoes, the Sky Davis Inflatable Air Jets, like everyone else. That is, until he meets the real Sky Davis. Roger begins pestering Patti to help him with his book report, and when Patti finally loses her temper and yells at Roger to leave her alone, they get punished with a trip to detention. This doesn't sit well with Doug, who tries to stop Roger from bugging Patti.
8	8	"Doug Gets His Ears Lowered"	Yvette Kaplan	Lisa Melamed	October 27, 1991	008
8	8	"Doug on the Wild Side"	John Paratore	Beth Bornstein	October 27, 1991	008
Doug decides that he needs a haircut, but he doesn't want just ANY kind of haircut. He goes around town, trying to find a barber that can cut his hair the same way his old friend in Bloatsburg did. He looks all over and finds Mr. Sweeny before escaping the dangerous barber Fluke. Doug's motorcycle-riding Grandma Opal comes to visit and she teaches Doug to take risks and enjoy life while taking him on his first motorcycle ride and sushi lunch.
9	9	"Doug's Big Catch"	Jean-Pierre Jacquet	Ken Scarborough	November 3, 1991	009
9	9	"Doug Needs Money"	Johan Edstrom	Joseph Stillman	November 3, 1991	009
Doug accompanies Mr. Dink to the Big Time Bass-Off Contest, in order to try and catch a fish named Chester who stole Bud's wallet 30 years ago. Doug and Skeeter try to make some money in order to buy Mr. Dink a new grill, after they accidentally break his old one with a baseball.
10	10	"Doug's Runaway Journal"	Ken Kimmelman	Joseph Stillman	November 10, 1991	010B
10	10	"Doug's Doodle"	Carol Millican	Ken Scarborough	November 10, 1991	010A
Doug freaks out when he can't find his journal anywhere. All his personal thoughts are in that journal, and he'll do anything to get it back. After posting flyers around town, he learns that Roger has found it. Doug accidentally hands in his doodle of Mrs. Wingo, instead of his essay assignment. Hoping he won't get into trouble or be embarrassed, Doug tries to get the doodle back as Smash Adams.
11	11	"Doug's Cookin'"	Yvette Kaplan	Alan Higgins	November 17, 1991	011
11	11	"Doug Loses Dale"	Jean-Pierre Jacquet	Kayte Kuch & Sheryl Scarborough	November 17, 1991	011
Doug and Patti are both paired up in a cooking class competition. When Patti tells Doug she can't cook, Doug invites her over to his house to practice some easy recipes and decide what to cook for their class. Doug is nervous because he is given the job of babysitting Skeeter's younger brother, Dale, when the Valentines leave for a trip. So he asks all his friends for advice on babysitting, but Doug finds out you can't always rely on other people's advice. But while Doug is cleaning, Dale sneaks off and then he has to search the entire house for him.
12	12	"Doug is Quailman"	John Paratore	Alan Silberberg	November 24, 1991	012
12	12	"Doug Out in Left Field"	Tony Eastman	Lisa Melamed & Alicia Marie Schudt	November 24, 1991	012
Doug spends a day drawing his favorite cartoon super hero, Quailman, who saves students from the evil Dr. Klotzenstein, who is using his "brain drain" to suck intelligence out of kids at the Bluffington School. Patti is rejected from the school baseball team by Coach Spitz, only because she's a girl. She then organizes her own team with the other kids who have been rejected, and challenges Coach Spitz to a game.
13	13	"Doug's Fair Lady"	Ken Kimmelman	Bradley Kesden & Skip Shepard	December 8, 1991	013
13	13	"Doug Says Goodbye"	Carol Millican	Ken Scarborough	December 8, 1991	013
Doug is reluctant to ask Patti to the Tri-County Fair, so Skeeter invites Beebe to go with them too. Once at the fair, Doug wants to get the chance to ride the Ferris wheel with Patti. Before Beebe's big costume party, Skeeter has to tell Doug that they can't go because he believes that he and his family are going move to a new town. Doug can't believe Skeeter has to move, but then Skeeter secretly moves in with Doug in order to stay in Bluffington with his best friend.

==== Season 2 (1992) ====
Beginning with this season, only a single piece of music is played during the closing credits, though the animation remains the same until the fifth season.

Additionally, the more familiar Jumbo Pictures closing logo started to be used.

This season is also one of the only two seasons to not have any full-length episodes.

No. overall	No. in season	Title	Directed by	Written by	Original release date	Prod. code
14	1	"Doug's Got No Gift"	John Paratore	Joe Fallon	September 13, 1992	015
14	1	"Doug vs. the Klotzoid Zombies"	Carol Millican	Alan Silberberg	September 13, 1992	015
Doug unintentionally spends all of his money on a video arcade game, "Bag the Neematoad", and now he can't buy Patti a beetball as a birthday present. So Mr. Dink gives Doug the idea of making a gift for Patti, and all Doug hopes is that she'll like it. Roger invites everyone over to his house except for poor Doug, who begins to feel left out. Doug later imagines himself as Quailman battling Dr. Klotzenstein, the mad scientist who turns all of Bluffington's citizens into mindless zombies with his zombie chips. Doug then faces Roger at his trailer to discover he has organized a one year anniversary party for Doug.
15	2	"Doug Takes the Case"	Paul Sparagano	Ken Scarborough	September 20, 1992	014
15	2	"Doug's Secret Song"	Yvette Kaplan	Tim Grundmann	September 20, 1992	014
Beebe brings her father's expensive new Chromo Neato 5000 radio to school in order to impress her peers. When it ends up going missing, Mr. Bone threatens to give the whole class afternoon detention if the radio is not returned. Hoping to catch the real culprit, Doug decides to take the case as "The Chameleon", who is a master of disguise. But when Doug finds out that Skeeter has the radio, he'll either have to turn him in or cover for him. Doug writes a secret and quirky love song about Patti, and makes it into a video at a new store in the mall where people can make their own music videos. But after a mix-up at the store (and after being beset by a severe case of hiccups while filming the video), Doug gets Patti's video and Doug thinks his tape fell into the hands of Patti, who is taking it to an up-all-night party at Beebe's house.
16	3	"Doug's Secret Admirer"	Ken Kimmelman	Ken Scarborough	September 27, 1992	016
16	3	"Doug's on TV"	Johan Edstrom	Al Higgins	September 27, 1992	016
A secret admirer is putting love letters inside Doug's locker and Doug is horrified to discover that it isn't Patti, but Beebe. Doug is excited when his Aunt Betty-Ann invites him and Skeeter to be on a TV show. The only problem is that it is the kiddie show Kiddie Koral. Doug goes to the kiddie show with Skeeter and later regrets it when Roger sees him on the show and tapes it. But when Betty-Ann recognizes Roger, the embarrassment tables are turned.
17	4	"Doug's Dinner Date"	Yvette Kaplan	Al Higgins	October 4, 1992	017
17	4	"Doug Meets Fentruck"	Paul Sparagano	John Wohlbruck	October 4, 1992	017
Patti invites Doug over for dinner with the rest of the gang and Doug is thrilled. It's a dream come true for Doug, until Patti tells Doug she will be serving liver and onions (one of Doug's most hated foods). With the dinner looming, Doug tries everything (including hypnosis) to overcome his fear. An exchange student from Yakestonia named Fentruck Stimmel comes to live in Bluffington and attend Bluffington School. However, after Fentruck asks Doug to help him write a letter to a "yellow-haired girl who sits in front of me", Doug begins to suspect that the new kid may already have eyes for Patti.
18	5	"Doug Battles the Rulemeister" "Doug Meets the Rulemeister"	Paul Sparagano	Alan Silberberg	October 11, 1992	020
18	5	"Doug's a Genius"	Yvette Kaplan	Ken Scarborough	October 11, 1992	020
Roger tricks Doug into breaking a school rule which causes Mr. Bone to give his entire class Saturday detention. Doug imagines how Quailman would handle the situation as he battles the Rulemeister and his pointless rules to try to get his friends out of detention. Doug is irritated when Porkchop chases a raccoon and the two animals accidentally get their paw-prints all over the backside of his painting for the Arts Guild Exhibition. But everyone, including the art teacher Mrs. Perigrew, thinks his ruined painting is a brilliant piece of art! When Doug's art is hung in an exhibit, Doug imagines how Smash Adams would get it out, but knows he'll have to tell the truth about his "masterpiece".
19	6	"Doug Saves Roger"	Carol Millican	Alan Higgins	October 18, 1992	021
19	6	"Doug's Big News"	John Paratore	Tim Grundmann	October 18, 1992	021
Mr. Bone's nephew Percy Femur transfers to Bluffington School and Roger gets ready to be the bully that he normally is, but it turns out that Percy is very tough and a lot bigger than Roger, and Roger's the one who gets bullied for a change. When Doug tries to convince Percy to leave Roger alone, Percy turns his wrath on Doug, but Doug is saved when Mr. Bone catches his nephew in the act and sends Percy back to his old school. When the kids in Mrs. Wingo's class criticize Mr. Bone's dull school news video show, he challenges the class to do a better one. The entire class then turns their classroom into a newsroom with reports from the students, but Roger then sets out to sabotage all their hard work.
20	7	"Doug's a Big Fat Liar"	Ken Kimmelman	Joe Fallon	October 25, 1992	022
20	7	"Doug Wears Tights"	Yvette Kaplan	John Wohlbrook	October 25, 1992	022
Doug wants to go to the Hoe-Down dance with Patti. But when Connie asks him, Doug lies and says he's staying home to take care of his sick cousin "Melvin." His lie gets him into big trouble when Patti and Connie come over to visit his cousin. Doug gets Judy to play "Melvin," and she does too good a job, because Patti invites "Melvin" to the Hoe-Down. In front of the dance teacher, Miss Mimi, Doug signs up to be the lead dancer in the school ballet so he can be dance partners with Patti. His fears about being teased by Roger are quelled when Roger is cast in the ballet as the Rat King. However, he's not so happy to learn that Beebe may get the lead female role instead of Patti, since Mrs. Bluff owns the ballet company.
21	8	"Doug's Derby Dilemma"	Ken Kimmelman	Joe Fallon	November 1, 1992	019
21	8	"Doug on His Own" "Doug's On His Own"	Johan Edstrom	Michele Jabloner	November 1, 1992	019
Doug and his friends are all building soapbox racers for the Mt. St. Buster Downhill Speed Race, and they all want to win the secret mystery prize, and Doug and Skeeter are having trouble keeping their racer a secret. But during the race, there's a disaster on the track, and everyone finds out that helping a friend is more important than winning. Mr. and Mrs. Funnie go to Judy's school dance as chaperones and Doug plans a night in the house all by himself. However, a huge thunderstorm knocks out the electricity and ruins his plan - and having watched a scary movie on TV doesn't help. In order to get the power back in his house, Doug must find the power box in his basement, in the dark.
22	9	"Doug on the Trail"	Paul Sparagano	Matt Steinglass	November 8, 1992	023
22	9	"Doug Meets RoboBone"	Johan Edstrom	Alan Silberberg	November 8, 1992	023
The Bluffscouts are on a canoe trip. But trouble arrives when Scoutmaster Dink heads off into the forest to get a new navigational computer, leaving Roger in charge. Doug and Skeeter can't stand Roger's orders, so they search for Mr. Dink who seems to have disappeared. When Doug gets The Beets to play a concert at school, Mr. Bone cancels the deal. In a Quailman daydream, Quailman battles RoboBone and his robotic army, which leads to a compromise with Mr. Bone, and everyone learns the importance of compromise.
23	10	"Doug's Hot Ticket"	Ken Kimmelman	Alan Silberberg	November 15, 1992	025
23	10	"Doug's Dental Disaster"	Johan Edstrom	Al Higgins	November 15, 1992	025
The Beets concert in Doug's former hometown of Bloatsburg is sold out, but luckily Judy has two tickets which she doesn't want. Judy gives Doug her tickets and he and Skeeter set out on an incredible adventure on the road and end up as Beets roadies when they meet other fans. Doug's tooth hurts when he gets a cavity after biting into a candy bar at the movies, and afterwards has to go to his dentist. Although he doesn't want to go to the appointment, he daydreams how Secret Agent Smash Adams would handle a dental situation, but soon his frown turns to a smile when he meets his new female dentist, Dr. Kay.
24	11	"Doug's on Stage"	John Paratore	Al Higgins	November 22, 1992	018
24	11	"Doug's Worst Nightmare"	Carol Millican	Ken Scarborough	November 22, 1992	018
Bluffington students are cast in the school play, which shows the historic founding of the town. Doug's sister Judy is hired as director, who decides to take on a more "modern" approach to the story. However, parental complaints (which lead Mr. Bone to interfere) threaten the new approach. When Roger starts acting nice, Doug's worst nightmare has finally become a reality – Roger has developed a crush on Judy. The only thing that could make things worse for Doug, is if Judy has fallen for Roger.
25	12	"Doug Pumps Up"	John Paratore	Ken Scarborough	November 29, 1992	024
25	12	"Doug Goes Hollywood"	Carol Millican	Al Higgins	November 29, 1992	024
Doug competes in the Mayor's fitness test featuring Ronald Weisenheimer, an Arnold Schwarzenegger-like celebrity, and to get in shape, Doug starts a crash exercise program. But this only brings Doug to hurting every muscle in his body, and with sore muscles, Doug may not be able to compete. When J.B. Spiggot, a famous movie director, is looking for someone in Bluffington to be in his newest project, everyone is sure they'll be chosen, especially Judy. When Doug almost gets an offer, he worries about hurting Judy's feelings, but he's saved when Porkchop is who J.B. wants.
26	13	"Doug's Lost Weekend"	Paul Sparagano	Ken Scarborough	December 6, 1992	026
26	13	"Doug's Lucky Hat"	Yvette Kaplan	Alan Silberberg	December 6, 1992	026
Doug wins a Super-Pretendo with the video game Space Munks, but the more he plays, the more he can't put it down. Suddenly, he realizes the weekend is over and he hasn't even started his homework. A mysterious hat floats onto Doug's head. Strange and wonderful things begin to happen to him, so Doug claims the hat as lucky, and it isn't long before Roger wants to get his hands on it.

==== Season 3 (1993) ====
Along with the second season, this season is one of the only two seasons to not have any full-length episodes.

No. overall	No. in season	Title	Directed by	Written by	Original release date	Prod. code	U.S. households (millions)
27	1	"Doug's Fat Cat"	Yvette Kaplan	Matt Steinglass	April 11, 1993	027	1.28
27	1	"Doug and Patti P.I."	Carol Millican	Dietrich Smith	April 11, 1993	027	1.28
Roger asks Doug to take care of his cat, Stinky, while he goes on a trip. Since Stinky has been acting weird to Roger, he said that he has put Stinky a diet. But, Stinky not only rips up the Funnie home but also eats all the junk food in the house and gets sick. Doug rushes him to the vet, hoping he'll be OK. But when Doug gets there, he and Roger are surprised that they find out Stinky is really female, and saw that she just had kittens. Someone has sabotaged the wheelbarrow race at the Bluffington picnic and now no one can be in the race. So, Doug and Patti team up to solve the mystery of who did it and why.
28	2	"Doug is Slave for a Day"	Johan Edstrom	Alan Higgins	April 18, 1993	028	N/A
28	2	"Doug Rocks the House"	Paul Sparagano	Steve Higgins	April 18, 1993	028	N/A
Judy catches Doug breaking a vase that belonged to their mom. To keep her quiet, Doug must agree to be her slave for a week. He suffers until he realizes that the only way out is to tell the truth. Doug destroys an entire old house in a rock-throwing contest with Roger. But when Patti witnesses the contest, she gets angry at Doug, and he has to figure out why.
29	3	"Doug's Comic Collaboration"	Ken Kimmelman	Matt Steinglass	April 25, 1993	029	N/A
29	3	"Doug's Pet Capades"	John Paratore	Alan Higgins	April 25, 1993	029	N/A
Doug and Skeeter decide to work together to create their own comic book featuring Silver Skeeter and Quailman fighting the evil Wacky Weather Man. But when they can't agree which character should be the hero, the boys end up not speaking to each other. Porkchop wants to enter the Bluffington pet talent show, but Doug is completely oblivious until Roger and his cat, Stinky, challenge him and Porkchop. Doug's now determined to come up with the perfect act for his dog, with some help from Skeeter and Larry.
30	4	"Doug's Career Anxiety"	Carol Millican	Ken Scarborough	May 9, 1993	030	1.41
30	4	"Doug's Big Brawl"	Yvette Kaplan	Alan Higgins	May 9, 1993	030	1.41
For Career Week, Doug is chosen by a computer to be corporate executive in charge of a class project. He can't handle the stress until he finds out there was an error in the guidance counselor's computer. After Larry the A.V. nerd punches Doug in the face, Doug punches him back. Suddenly, the other A.V. nerds make Doug look bad at school and all of the other students are hoping Doug will start a new fight with Larry. Doug doesn't want to fight again and comes up with a quick solution.
31	5	"Doug's Huge Zit"	Johan Edstrom	Evan Gore	May 16, 1993	031	N/A
31	5	"Doug Flies a Kite"	Paul Sparagano	Michale Schaefer & Ken Scarborough	May 16, 1993	031	N/A
Doug is invited to Beebe's party, but something shows up on his face that makes it impossible for him to go out in public. Mr. Funnie convinces Doug that he has a great idea to build the perfect kite to compete in the upcoming Bluffscout airshow. Doug thinks his Dad's idea is too simple, so he changes it thinking it will be better, but he gets surprising results.
32	6	"Doug and the Weird Kids"	Ken Kimmelman	Alan Higgins	May 23, 1993	032	1.74
32	6	"Doug's Behind the Wheel"	John Paratore	Christine Ecklund & Keith Hoffman	May 23, 1993	032	1.74
For a project, Mrs. Wingo lets her students get to know each other more and Doug is paired with the two people no one else wants to be paired up with, the weird twins Al and Moo Sleech. When it's time for Doug to write his report, the Sleech twins have one already written up for him. Doug knows he's going to have to visit the Sleech's to get his own facts. Judy is getting her license, and Doug tells Patti that she'll take them to the opening of an amusement park, Bumper Car Mania. Judy fails her test when she can't parallel park, and Doug must help her pass any way he can so he can get that ride from Judy.
33	7	"Doug's New Teacher"	Yvette Kaplan	Alan Silberberg	May 30, 1993	033	1.39
33	7	"Doug on First"	Carol Millican	Matt Steinglass	May 30, 1993	033	1.39
While Mrs. Wingo is away, a substitute named Ms. Newberry takes her place. Doug makes a bad first impression which places him as the class troublemaker and Roger as the nice guy. So Doug tries everything to change Ms. Newberry's image of him. Doug and his friends are on the team Patti's Pulverizers, and they are on top when it comes to winning games. All of the parents, including Doug's dad, think it's unfair that only Patti gets to pitch and they want their own kids to pitch. But after the parents have their way, they realize that it may not be a good idea.
34	8	"Doug's Cartoon"	Paul Sparagano	Ken Scarborough	June 6, 1993	034	N/A
34	8	"Doug's Monster Movie"	Johan Edstrom	Joe Fallon	June 6, 1993	034	N/A
Assistant Principal Bone shuts down the school newspaper because of Doug's unflattering cartoon about the school's least favorite lunch food, magic mystery meat. All the other students love the cartoon, so they rally to get their newspaper back. Doug and Skeeter are having trouble finding a scary monster for their homemade video movie, until Mayor White creates a monster of his own with his "beautify Bluffington" campaign, which was inspired by Doug's mom Mrs. Funnie.
35	9	"Doug's Hot Property"	Ken Kimmelman	Dietrich Smith	June 13, 1993	035	N/A
35	9	"Doug and the Little Liar" "Doug & The Little Liar"	John Paratore	Matt Steinglass	June 13, 1993	035	N/A
Some tough high schoolers offer to sell Doug the very rare first issue of the Man-O-Steel Man comic book, the one issue he is missing from his collection. That same issue turns out to be missing from Sully's comic book store and Doug feels guilty that he had bought Sully's stolen issue. However, when Mr. Sully lets only one customer into his shop at a time for security reasons, Doug decides to do what is right for everyone. There's a new girl in town named Loretta Lequigly who says she is from Yakestonia and can speak the language. Loretta catches Skeeter's eye and Doug is convinced that Loretta is a liar, and Skeeter is believing everything she says. With help from Fentruck, Doug sets out to expose Loretta's deceit and hoping Skeeter will break up with her. Though Loretta admits she isn't fluent in Yakestonesian, she turns out to be not as big a liar as she seemed. Skeeter goes on the trip with her leaving Doug a pyrrhic victory and Doug also learns a lesson about judging people too soon.
36	10	"Doug Inc."	Carol Millican	Joe Fallon	June 20, 1993	036	N/A
36	10	"Doug's Nightmare on Jumbo Street"	Yvette Kaplan	Joe Fallon	June 20, 1993	036	N/A
Doug wants to raise enough money to buy a new skateboard and sets up a lawn mowing enterprise to do so. Skeeter and the Sleech Twins join in, but they soon feel Doug is being unfair. Doug may raise the cash, but he risks losing his friends in the process. Everyone in school is talking about the final scene in the latest horror movie, The Abnormal, but Doug closed his eyes and missed the ending. After thinking that he's a chicken for not seeing the ending he finally gets up the courage to see the film again and realizes it is not only not scary, it's silly.
37	11	"Doug's Shock Therapy"	Johan Edstrom	Evan Gore & Dietrich Smith	June 27, 1993	037	N/A
37	11	"Doug is Hamburger Boy"	Paul Sparagano	Ken Scarborough	June 27, 1993	037	N/A
Mr. Bone is in the hospital and Doug unwillingly volunteers to take get well soon cards to him from Mrs. Wingo's class. But when Doug gets there, Mr. Bone thinks he's getting Doug's prized skateboard instead. What's more, the skateboard brings childhood memories to Mr. "T-Bone". Mr. Dink volunteers Doug to dress up as Hamburger Boy and talk to kids in costume at the Honker Burger for a week. Plus, he has to go to the Bluffington picnic with Patti and be Hamburger Boy without telling anyone who he is. Doug's busy weekend will be something he'll have to handle all on his own.
38	12	"Doug and the Yard of Doom"	Ken Kimmelman	Alan Higgins	July 4, 1993	038	N/A
38	12	"Doug's Garage Band"	John Paratore	Ken Scarborough	July 4, 1993	038	N/A
Doug and Skeeter are playing with Patti's new Wacky-Wizzer frisbee and accidentally toss it into a fenced-in yard. Doug tries going in to get it back, but encounters a huge guard dog named Lady. Doug imagines how Race Canyon would get himself out of the mess. Beebe gets Doug and Skeeter their first gig for their new band – but they have to let her join. Now, every time Doug wants to add something to the show he has to let in new members, and it seems they all just want to play the drums.
39	13	"Doug's Great Beet War"	Carol Millican	Matt Steinglass & Dietrich Smith	July 11, 1993	039	N/A
39	13	"Doug's Magic Act"	Yvette Kaplan	Ken Scarborough	July 11, 1993	039	N/A
When the Bluffington School float for the upcoming Beet parade goes missing, Doug is accused of helping the Moody School students steal it. So Doug and Porkchop must sneak into the Moody School to see for themselves. There is a reference to The Beatles White Album at the end of the episode. The Moody School's float is a plain white square with the word "Beet" on it. Doug tries to impress Patti with a magic trick from his new magic set, but it backfires and they end up handcuffed together, without the key, for the entire afternoon. This does not sit well with Patti as it makes her miss planned activities. After many attempts to get the key, they realize the magic store owner may have a solution - if they can get there before the store closes!

==== Season 4 (1993–94) ====
Note: This entire season was completed by December 1993, according to the copyright year for each episode.

No. overall	No. in season	Title	Directed by	Written by	Original release date	Prod. code	U.S. households (millions)
40	1	"Doug's Math Problem"	Paul Sparagano	Matt Steinglass	September 26, 1993	040	N/A
40	1	"Doug's Big Feat"	Yvette Kaplan	Andrew Steele	September 26, 1993	040	N/A
Doug gets a letter from his school and panics when he sees it's addressed to his parents. Since he's doing poorly in math, Doug immediately assumes that it's a failing notice! So he does everything to find out what the letter says and avoid his parents from seeing it. If that wasn't enough, Patti is trying to tell Doug something and get her message to him. It's the day of the big football game against Bloatsburg, and Doug is snared by Coach Spitz, who mistakenly believes Doug has a "golden toe" for field kicking. Doug is then put into the next football game by Coach Spitz, and he is very nervous when he finds out that Percy Femur is on the other team.
41	2	"Doug's Bum Rap"	Tony Eastman & Marc Sevier	Joe Fallon	October 3, 1993	041	N/A
41	2	"Doug and Patti Sittin' in a Tree"	Ken Kimmelman	Matt Steinglass	October 3, 1993	041	N/A
Doug is accused of cheating when he and Chalky score identical marks on a test. Both of them are given one day to confess or else they'll both have to take a harder re-test this Saturday. Doug knows he didn't cheat so he tries to talk about it with Chalky, but he keeps avoiding Doug. Finally, Doug gets Chalky to confess, and Chalky accepts the consequences, which involve taking the re-test and missing the big football game. Patti asks Doug to go with her to the movies, and now everyone at school is teasing them about dating. Even Doug wonders if it is really a date or not. In order to find out, Skeeter goes through dating scenarios from a book with Doug.
42	3	"Doug Door-to-Door"	Carol Millican	Joe Fallon	October 10, 1993	042	N/A
42	3	"Doug Tips the Scales"	Tony Eastman & Drew Edwards	Dennis Garvey	October 10, 1993	042	N/A
Doug's Bluff Scout Troop #617 has to raise money for new canoes, so they sell "Bluff Scout Booster Bars" door to door. But after being rejected by everyone, Roger offers a new way to sell the bars, which Doug doesn't agree with. Then when Doug sells a bar to Mr. Swirly, he realizes the problem of why the bars taste so horrible. Over the weekend, Doug puts on a few pounds at Grandma Funnie's house and has been invited to Beebe's pool party. Doug is too embarrassed to be seen in a swimsuit, so he decides to work the extra weight off before the party using Ronald "Prepare to Suffer" Weisenheimer's videos. However, it turns out he's not the only one who's insecure about his body.
43	4	"Doug's Halloween Adventure"	Myrna Bushman & Paul Sparagano	Ken Scarborough & Alan Higgins	October 30, 1993	043	N/A
Doug dresses up as a hero named Race Canyon. When a spooky new amusement ride, Blood Stone Manor, opens up at Funkytown on Halloween night, Skeeter wants to check it out instead of trick or treating. Doug reluctantly agrees to go, but when the park closes at 10:00pm before their turn comes up, Roger convinces them to go on the ride anyway. Once on the ride, Roger scares Doug and Skeeter big time, so it's up to them to scare Roger back!
44	5	"Doug En Vogue"	Ken Kimmelman	Joe Fallon	November 7, 1993	044	1.70
44	5	"Doug's Mail Order Mania"	Tony Eastman & Marc Sevier	Andy Yerkes & Kenneth Lonergan	November 7, 1993	044	1.70
Doug wishes he was more fashionable until his friends at school accuse him of dressing like Dylan Farnum from the TV show "Teen Heart Street". He's tired of being told he's copying someone else's style, so he decides to shop for a new look. Doug becomes the victim of a contest scam that promises to make him rich. But after trying so hard and paying a lot of money, Doug later realizes he may not be as close to winning as he thinks.
45	6	"Doug's Birthday Present"	Tony Eastman & Drew Edwards	Steve Higgins	November 14, 1993	045	N/A
45	6	"Doug's Fan Club"	Carol Millican	Patty Hume	November 14, 1993	045	N/A
Doug is impressed by Mr. Bluff's gifts to Beebe. Mr. Funnie feels pressured to make more money for a better birthday present for his son, so he decides to start his own photography store. At first, Doug is excited by the thought of more money, but when he sees the effects on his father and their family, he realizes that money can't buy happiness. After performing a magic trick, Doug becomes adored by a second grader named Todd Bentley, who starts to follow Doug everywhere. Doug enjoys being idolized until Todd embarrasses him in front of his friends, and finally tells Todd to leave him alone, which upsets Todd and leaves Doug feeling guilty.
46	7	"Doug Runs"	Myrna Bushman	Alan Higgins	November 21, 1993	046	N/A
46	7	"Doug Clobbers Patti"	Paul Sparagano	Alan Higgins	November 21, 1993	046	N/A
Doug is nominated for class treasurer, and when he finds himself running against Willy White, the mayor's son, he starts making promises to his voters he knows he can't keep. Meanwhile, Tippi Dink runs for Mayor of Bluffington and wins! While Skeeter's uncle wins for class treasurer instead of Doug and Willy. Doug beats Patti in a bowling match, and Skeeter tells everyone about it. Doug gains popularity, but feels bad about beating Patti every time they play a game. It seems Patti is having a losing streak and is upset about it. Doug decides the only way to save Patti's feelings is to try to make himself unlucky.
47	8	"Doug's Treasure Hunt"	Tony Eastman & Marc Sevier	Joe Fallon	November 27, 1993	047	N/A
47	8	"Doug's Brainy Buddy"	Ken Kimmelman	Alan Higgins, Ken Scarborough & Dietrich Smith	November 27, 1993	047	N/A
Doug and Skeeter go digging for artifacts when they get assigned to research Bluffington's history. They soon get into trouble though, when they are caught digging on the Bluff estate even though they didn't know. Skeeter gets a high score on an intelligent test making him a genius, and Doug is convinced Skeeter got the wrong test results. But soon Skeeter starts to spend less time with Doug and more time thinking about going to college, and Doug thinks he has lost his best friend.
48	9	"Doug Ripped Off!"	Tony Eastman & Drew Edwards	Matt Steinglass	December 5, 1993	048	N/A
48	9	"Doug's Babysitter"	Carol Millican	Mark Dacus	December 5, 1993	048	N/A
All of Doug's friends have cool bikes, but Doug hates his—until he discovers that someone has stolen it. He thinks about who could have taken it, and wonders if one of his friends is a thief. Doug and Judy get into a fight and blow their big chance to stay alone in the house while their parents are on vacation. Instead, they're cursed with the strict baby-sitter, Mrs. Stintson, who is a firm disciplinarian and serves dinners of prunes, and they realize that the only way out of this mess is to cooperate.
49	10	"Doug's in the Money"	Ken Kimmelman	Jim Jinkins & David Campbell	December 12, 1993	050	N/A
49	10	"Doug's Sister Act"	Tony Eastman & Marc Sevier	Matt Steinglass	December 12, 1993	050	N/A
An envelope of money falls from a speeding car and Doug finds it with a huge fortune in it. Doug hands it in to the police and everyone makes fun of him for doing it. After no one claims the money, the police tell Doug he can keep the money. When Doug discovers who the real owner is, he must choose between what's legal and what he knows is right. Mrs. Funnie invites Judy's new boyfriend over for dinner, but Judy is embarrassed by her boring family, especially Doug. So she decides to "spruce" things up around the house, but a resentful Doug decides to do some "sprucing up" of his own.
50	11	"Doug's Christmas Story"	Paul Sparagano & Myrna Bushman	Ken Scarborough	December 12, 1993	049	N/A
When Porkchop has been mistakenly accused of attacking Beebe, Doug has to try to clear his best non-human friend out. Unfortunately, former Mayor White, and Bill Bluff are determined to make sure that Porkchop never bothers anyone again. After a trial in court, Porkchop is sentenced to a dog pound for bad dogs, and after Doug's attempt to break Porkchop out of the pound fails, Doug tearfully realizes that Porkchop may be put down. He tries to imagine how Quailman, Smash Adams and Race Canyon would solve the problem, but finally realizes he's going to have to find his own way out of this mess. At the return court date, Doug convinces the judge to let Porkchop return to the scene of the crime to show them what really happened. Beebe falls in the thin ice, and Porkchop rescues her. Everyone now realizes that the reason Porkchop "attacked" Beebe before was to try to pull her away from the thin ice. Doug is proud of Porkchop, who is now hailed as a hero. At Porkchop's request, Mayor Bluff hosts a Christmas party for all the dogs in the pound in order to find them all new owners.
51	12	"Doug Throws a Party"	Carol Millican	Andy Yerkes & Kenneth Lonergan	December 26, 1993	051	N/A
51	12	"Doug Way Out West"	Tony Eastman & Drew Edwards	Alan Higgins	December 26, 1993	051	N/A
Doug is having his first house party, and although he is very excited about it, he doesn't want it to be lame. When Roger suggests to play Truth or Dare, Doug hopes it'll make his party better. When Patti invites everyone to go horseback riding at a dude ranch, Doug brags about how well he can ride. But his exaggerations get him in trouble when he is assigned an aggressive horse that he can't handle.
52	13	"Doug Graduates"	Paul Sparagano	Matt Steinglass	January 2, 1994	052	N/A
52	13	"Doug's Bad Trip"	Myrna Bushman	Alan Higgins	January 2, 1994	052	N/A
Doug and his friends are getting ready for the end of sixth grade and are graduating from Bluffington School. Doug feels a bit sad about leaving so he tries to find Principal Buttsavitch to talk to him. But when he finds out that Roger is as reluctant to leave the school as he is, Doug convinces Roger (and himself) that the new school will be great. As the summer begins, the Funnies plan to drive across the country to visit the Great Painted Gorge. Mr. Funnie is committed to keeping to a schedule, but Doug and Judy convince him to stop at several tourist traps along the way. The family isn't having any fun on the trip, until they finally reach the stop that makes it all worthwhile.

=== Disney seasons (1996–99) ===
==== Season 5 (1996–97) ====
In February 1996, Jumbo Pictures was acquired by Disney. Disney greenlit a fifth season of Doug, which Nickelodeon had previously declined to order, for Disney's children's programming block on ABC. This season introduced a new theme song and, at Jinkins' decision, some changes to the characters. In an interview, Jinkins said, "We'd already done a hundred and fifty some-odd stories, so our writing team was looking for a way to restart. The changes were my doing. I wanted to shake it up." To emphasize how the episodes were brand-new, this season was called Brand Spanking New! Doug. As of this season, episodes are now made up of one 22-minute stories. The ending credits also changed to where Doug chases Porkchop from left to right and then the latter chases the former to the left. The Christmas-themed special 15th episode "Doug's Secret Christmas" premiered on the network in primetime.

Jumbo considers these seasons part of the same series as the previous seasons, with the production codes labelling them as the 53rd episode onwards.

Every episode of this season was directed by both Jim Jinkins & Jack Spillum.

No. overall	No. in season	Title	Written by	Original release date	Prod. code	Viewers (millions)
53	1	"Doug's Last Birthday"	Joe Fallon	September 7, 1996	BSN-053	N/A
As the summer draws to a close, Doug's fears about the changes that are happening in his life (including the Honker Burger being changed into a French restaurant called Chez Honque, Roger becoming rich, The Beets breaking up, a new middle school being built, Connie losing weight, and Patti being homeschooled), make him think about canceling his birthday parties.
54	2	"Doug's New School"	Joe Fallon	September 14, 1996	BSN-054	N/A
It's the first day of seventh grade at the new middle school, but the new school still doesn't have a name, so a "Name Your School" student contest is created by the former Mayor White, who is now the school's principal. Doug and Patti begin arguing over their ideas. Mr. Bluff, who funded the building of the school, decides to name it after Beebe. Meanwhile, the gang is on the search for the perfect new hangout since the Honker Burger is now Chez Honque. That hangout at the end is revealed to be Swirly's.
55	3	"Doug Grows Up"	Ken Scarborough	September 21, 1996	BSN-055	N/A
Doug and Skeeter wear their Bluff-Scout uniforms to school to prepare for the upcoming Shindig-a-rama. Doug gets laughed at and concludes the Bluff-Scouts are "kids stuff", so he quits. Doug starts to think the Bluff-Scout duties are childish and searches for a more grown up environment.
56	4	"Doug's Hoop Nightmare"	Scott Fellows	September 28, 1996	BSN-056	N/A
After the Funnie family becomes curious when Doug receives a letter from Bolivia, Doug, through flashbacks, tells the story of what happened last summer at a sports camp. Doug's explanation involves the previous summer, where Doug went to the Grinning Bear Sports Camp with Patti. Meantime, Doug's asthmatic cabinmate Leonard, who has made a career of escaping summer camps, plans yet another escape. However, Doug, Chalky, and Patti have to worry about the upcoming basketball game they have to play against a tougher camp.
57	5	"Doug: A Limited Corporation"	Ken Scarborough	October 5, 1996	BSN-058	N/A
The Beets are having a break-up concert. One minor problem is that Doug is broke. He tries working at his Grandma Edna's Craftee Shoppee with his Grandma Edna. Doug doesn't think the needlepoint kits are giving him the money he is looking for, so he tries other products, including pond scum, and espresso machines.
58	6	"Doug's in Debt"	Joe Fallon	October 12, 1996	BSN-059	N/A
For a class project, Judy lets Doug borrow one of her theatrical Napoleon hats after making him sign a contract. Doug loses the hat and Roger finds it and won't give it back to Doug. In order to get the hat back from Roger, he asks Doug to do many favors, including stealing a big plastic cow.
59	7	"Doug's Big Comeback"	Dennis Garvey	October 19, 1996	BSN-061	N/A
When Doug gets tired of being insulted by Roger and his gang, he gets help from Mr. Dink, who provides him with some home movies of the famous insult comedian, Rick Nickles. After viewing these home movies, Doug gets the ability to crack insulting jokes, prompting Ned, Boomer, and Willie to hanging out with him. At first it puts Roger in his place, but Doug soon realizes that he's made a mistake when he makes wisecracks about the people he loves. Meanwhile, the Beebe Bluff Middle School baseball team goes on strike after Chalky is unfair in his coaching.
60	8	"Doug's Bloody Buddy"	Joe Fallon	October 26, 1996	BSN-060	N/A
After Connie starts a rumor, the students of Beebe Bluff Middle School get into an uproar that Skeeter is really a vampire. Doug and Roger investigate the rumor and soon everyone becomes scared of Skeeter after they see him hanging out with bats. Soon all of his friends avoid him and on the night of his Halloween party, Doug feels guilty for not going to his party without even knowing what Skeeter thinks about the rumor.
61	9	"Doug's Patti Beef"	Matt Steinglass	November 2, 1996	BSN-057	N/A
Patti eyes the snooty club, The Junior Daughters of the Founding Mothers and Fathers where no boys are allowed, and Doug is surprised she's interested in it. Doug worries if Patti joins the club, she'll change and won't have time for him anymore. Meanwhile, Ned, Willie, and Boomer accidentally save the oldest tree in town and are treated as public heroes.
62	10	"Doug Directs"	Andrew Reich & Ted Cohen	November 9, 1996	BSN-062	N/A
Doug ends up directing the annual Founder's Day Pageant after Judy drops out of directing duties. The group decide to stage a musical based on the founding of Bluffington by the Bluff family. But everyone has different ideas for what to do, and the argument causes everyone to split up. A sudden blizzard leaves everyone stuck inside the school, and Doug realizes they will all have to cooperate to pull through.
63	11	"Doug's Movie Madness"	Mark York	November 16, 1996	BSN-064	N/A
After Doug and Skeeter see a commercial for the new movie Targetman, they desperately want to see it. Soon, all of Doug's friends and even his teachers are talking about Targetman. When Doug tells his parents he wants to see it, they don't allow him because it is way too violent and they feel Doug is not mature enough to see it. So Doug tries to be more mature in front of his parents in order for them to let him see the movie, but they still say no. Meanwhile, Mr. Klotz is in town to visit Roger who also wants to see Targetman, but Mr. Klotz won't let Roger see it, and he doesn't realize why. NOTE – This episode, for unexplained reasons, was skipped over by Toon Disney during its first few cycles, but was eventually shown.
64	12	"Doug's Brain Drain"	Jeff Kindley	November 23, 1996	BSN-063	N/A
It's B.L.A.B.A.B.B.A. (Be Like A Beaver, A Beebe Bluff Achiever) Day at the middle school, and there are dozens of clubs the students can join. Doug tries to find the best club and thinks that the Brain Team would impress Patti, and make him less average. Doug then takes the Brain Test and in order to be on the school's Brain Team. When he cheats, he ends up on the team, but can't handle studying for the Bowl of Brains Quiz Bowl.
65	13	"Doug: The Big Switch"	Al Higgins	November 30, 1996	BSN-065	N/A
After Doug's seemingly perfect evening is ruined by who he describes as his "far from perfect family", pertaining to him and Judy arguing over the TV, Doug decides to try to live as someone else for a day. In the switch for a day, Doug switches places with Patti, Skeeter switches places with Beebe, and Chalky switches places with Roger. At Skeeter's house, Beebe tries to babysit Dale, and Skeeter orders a banana sandwich at Beebe's house, but picks up two forks. At Doug's house, Patti watches Theda clean the house, and at Patti's house, Doug is homeschooled by Patti's dad.
66	14	"Doug Gets His Wish"	Jeff Kindley	December 7, 1996	BSN-066	N/A
After Doug gets his wish, Ms. Krystal is not at school, and Principal White takes over, after not liking her to get Willy in trouble. Patti, Skeeter, Beebe, Connie, and the rest are worried about Ms. Krystal. After Principal White is called out of class the next day, his son Willie takes over.
67	15	"Doug's Secret Christmas"	Ken Scarborough	December 14, 1996	BSN-067	9.5
With a new baby on the way, Doug's family is too busy to have a traditional Christmas and Doug wants one. So Doug and Porkchop decide to have their own secret holiday celebration in his room. But when he later finds the house completely empty, Mr. Funnie phones with news, and Doug's and Judy's baby sister, Dirtbike, is born on Christmas Day. Meanwhile, Fentruck tells all his friends how they spend Christmas in Yakestonia.
68	16	"Doug's Hot Dog"	Joe Fallon	January 11, 1997	BSN-068	N/A
Doug finds a lost puppy named Captain Cosmo (name revealed in "Doug's Disappearing Dog") in Lucky Duck Park, and he decides to keep it until its owner is found. But the puppy proves to be too much trouble at home. The new puppy may be cute, but he isn't like Porkchop and Doug realizes that Captain Cosmo is a regular puppy is a lot of work to take care of. When the puppy's owner is still not found, Doug gives all his friends a chance to own him. Meanwhile, Al and Moo calculate the day an alien is scheduled to land in Lucky Duck Park.
69	17	"Doug's Great Opportoonity" (Note: Originally called "Doug’s Great OpporTOONity")	Scott Fellows	January 18, 1997	BSN-069	N/A
It's the student council elections at the middle school and Beebe, Roger and Chalky are all running. Doug meets eighth-grader Guy Graham who gives him a job on the school newspaper as the cartoonist. Guy tells Doug to create a cartoon on the school student council election and draw who he thinks should win. When Roger and Beebe get word, they bribe Doug to make him draw the cartoon about them. Meanwhile, Mr. Mayonnaise becomes the middle school's new history teacher and Patti now attends school full day.
70	18	"Doug Gets a Roommate"	Steve Bannos	January 25, 1997	BSN-070	N/A
After a day of repeatedly taunting Doug, Ned Cauphee, Roger’s most obnoxious friend, angers Doug over his limit by plastering him with mashed potatoes and gravy. When Doug and his friends come out of the school, they see a fire at Ned's house, Doug feels at fault after telling Ned that "someday he'll get his." Mrs. Funnie offers to house him while Ned's house is fixed. When Ned arrives, Doug can't believe how well he behaves because he is nothing like that at school. Doug even starts to feel sympathetic towards Ned. But now Ned is off to visit Grandma Funnie with the rest of the Funnies and Doug is worried he'll ruin his grandmother's home. NOTE – This episode, for unexplained reasons, was skipped over by Toon Disney.
71	19	"Doug Gets Booked"	Joe Fallon	February 1, 1997	BSN-071	N/A
Ms. Kristal assigns a book report with no rules, she tells the class to use their imagination. At the same time, Beebe is being filmed for a documentary sponsored by her dad Mr. Bluff. This means the book reports will be shown on TV, which makes everyone in the class want to have the biggest and best report in the entire class. Doug decides to show some drawings he drew, but he realizes that it's not exciting enough, so he goes on a search to find a book where he can make a more exciting report. But when he doesn't have an exciting report the night it's due, he either has to present his drawings or nothing at all.
72	20	"Doug's Minor Catastrophe (Note: Originally called "Doug’s Filthy Habit")"	Matt Steinglass	February 8, 1997	BSN-072	N/A
The new snack fad "Nic Nacs" is ostensibly targeted at adults (despite its Joe Camel-like mascot and advertising during children's programs) and kids are going crazy to try some after Roger acquires a mass with a fake ID and resells it on the black market; it quickly becomes a popular fad. Through Doug's research for an article for the school paper, he discovers that the snack has a highly addictive "chemical relaxant" that brings with it unpleasant and temporary side effects. Meanwhile, Mr. Dink quits his job at Bluffco, and tries to write his own book.
73	21	"Doug's Big Panic"	Ken Scarborough	February 15, 1997	BSN-073	N/A
Guy sees a musical and is inspired by it. He tells Skeeter to work on a secret script for a huge drama play for Beebe Bluff Middle School. The play is a love story between Leonardo da Vinci and the Mona Lisa. Doug gets interested in auditioning when he learns Patti gets the female lead, and is in a kissing scene at the end of the play. Doug tries hard to get the male lead, but when Guy gives himself the role, Doug wonders if his work was wasted. But before showtime, Guy gets sick and someone else has to be the male lead.
74	22	"Doug's Hairy Situation"	Scott Fellows	February 22, 1997	BSN-074	N/A
Doug finds hair in his comb and fears he's going bald, and figures Patti won't want to hang out with him anymore. The gang also is going to meet at the new water park when it opens and Doug doesn't want to go because of his hair. Doug lets all these things get in the way of his fun, and later realizes he shouldn't have. Meanwhile, Patti gets her first pimple, Beebe gets her first nose job, Roger suspects that he may have gotten his first whisker, and Skeeter gets his first failing grade in shop class when his coat rack assignment isn't simple enough, so he is given a second chance to make another simple object.
75	23	"Doug: Oh, Baby"	Joe Fallon	March 1, 1997	BSN-075	N/A
Doug begins to worry that the new baby Cleopatra "Dirtbike" will end up being another Judy, and Judy is afraid she'll grow up to be like Doug. So the two set out to shape the baby's personality. When Mr. and Mrs. Funnie go out for an evening, Judy and Doug are left to babysit and don't want the other to be left alone with Dirtbike. But when their fighting leaves Dirtbike alone in Mr. Dink's house, they realize they are going to have to co-operate to get her out.
76	24	"Doug's Disappearing Dog"	Joe Fallon	March 8, 1997	BSN-076	N/A
Doug wakes up the morning after the Flounder's Day Picnic to find that Porkchop has packed up his things and is gone. When Porkchop disappears, Doug has to try to find him. He concludes that someone must have done something bad to him to make him pack up and leave. So he goes to talk all his friends to question them about what happened to Porkchop the day before, only to find that each of them remember things differently.
77	25	"Doug's Mural Mania"	Steve Bannos	March 15, 1997	BSN-077	N/A
Doug enters a school contest to paint a mural on a new school wall. Mrs. Perigrew and Principal White match Doug with Roger to paint a large mural. But when he has to share the mural design with Roger, he's not sure he can do it with him because he thinks Roger can't really draw. Meanwhile, Bluffington is in a heat wave and the Sleech twins think it is their fault, so they set out to change the hot weather.
78	26	"Doug on the Road"	Matt Steinglass	March 22, 1997	BSN-078	N/A
Doug and his friends decide to meet at Funkytown and spend a day having fun, so Judy volunteers to drive him there. But before she drops Doug off, Judy wants to shop at Snord Gruppen (an IKEA-inspired furniture store). After leaving the giant mall, Doug and Judy are on the road to go to Funkytown, but end up in the wrong place. Patti, Skeeter, Beebe, and the rest find Doug and Judy.

==== Season 6 (1997) ====
Season 6 was the first to debut on the newly-launched programming block, Disney's One Saturday Morning.

Every episode of this season was directed by Maurice Joyce.

No. overall	No. in season	Title	Written by	Original release date	Prod. code
79	1	"Doug's Secret of Success"	Joe Fallon	September 13, 1997	BSN-079
The lives of Doug and all the other students at Beebe Bluff Middle School become a frenzy when Bone returns and becomes the middle school's new vice principal. He soon starts throwing Roger into detention and making new school rules. Also, eighth graders invite Doug to join a secret club of the future powerful men of the universe. But in order to be worthy to join, Doug must prove he can be a successful person and it's cutting himself out of monster hunting with Skeeter.
80	2	"Doug's Friend's Friend"	Ken Scarborough	September 20, 1997	BSN-080
Skeeter is dating Beebe and Doug is disgusted by Skeeter's lovesick attitude and jealous of their friendship. Doug decides to fight back which ends up in the end of their friendship. Then when Doug tries to break up Skeeter and Beebe, Elmo reminds Doug who got them together. Meanwhile, a flood is reported to hit Bluffington, and Roger wants to be part of "the biggest thing to ever hit this town".
81	3	"Doug's Chubby Buddy"	Sandra Willard	September 27, 1997	BSN-081
Patti panics and thinks she's fat after watching a commercial selling a diet kit by a teenage actress, so she, Connie, and Beebe set out to lose weight. Patti decides to go on a drastic diet and exercise routine. But once she starts losing weight, she can't seem to stop herself, she even stops eating and appears to develop anorexia nervosa. This all comes to a head after Patti passes out when she goes 3 days without eating. Meanwhile, Skeeter and Roger try to bait the Lucky Duck Monster with a female monster. EDITED – This episode originally ended with Patti's voiceover encouraging viewers to learn more about eating disorders. This was removed in the syndicated version, and replaced with the voices of Roger and Skeeter arguing with each other.
82	4	"Doug: Quailman VI: The Dark Quail Saga"	Joe Fallon	October 4, 1997	BSN-082
After Guy asks Patti to a movie, Doug tries to imagine how Quailman would handle this situation, depicting Guy as a rival superhero named the Golden Salmon, who uses a secret identity as a media mogul named Rupert Schmupert.
83	5	"Judy, Judy, Judy"	Matt Steinglass	October 11, 1997	BSN-083
A new girl named Gwen meets with Judy and calls her "Jenny-Penny". Judy helps out with Gwen Gauntlet, her favorite actress and teen role model, while she is in town to shoot an entertainment show. Judy hopes she can get a recommendation from Gwen for Vole University. However, Gwen is so self-absorbed that it tests the limits of Judy's patience. Meanwhile, Doug and Skeeter think they've shot proof of the monster on Judy's video camera and Judy won't let them see the tape.
84	6	"Doug's Dougapalooza"	Scott Fellows	October 18, 1997	BSN-084
Connie Benge becomes obsessed with winning a local radio-station contest to become a rock 'n' roll star. She brings Doug into it, and is so obsessed she thinks about quitting school just like Flounder from The Beets did. Soon she realizes Flounder may have not done the right thing. Meanwhile, Al, Moo and Skeeter try to contact the monster of the lake by creating a monster calling machine.
85	7	"Doug Gets It All"	Joe Fallon	November 1, 1997	BSN-085
When Doug worries he is only average, he decides that to make his level of importance higher he should be a collector of unusual and (hopefully) valuable items. So he goes to a flea market with a valuable collector's item book looking for rubber tub stoppers and bowls, but someone has already gotten to them. Meanwhile, Roger gets on Mr. Bone's good side to get himself out of detention, and Skeeter asks the A.V. Nerds to help him find the Lucky Duck Monster using A.V. equipment.
86	8	"Doug's Thanksgiving"	Joe Fallon & Ken Scarborough	November 22, 1997	BSN-086
Beebe tells Bluff that the not-so-good thieves tell her to get in the end of the line. Bill Bluff's public relations firm decides that Bill should have Thanksgiving Day dinner with an average Bluffington family to increase his popularity. Doug's family is chosen and turns their simple Thanksgiving plans upside down. They won't let Patti join their dinner all because of Bluff and Judy doesn't like what he is doing in preparation for the big dinner, so Doug sets out to make everyone happy for Thanksgiving.

==== Season 7 (1998–99) ====
In the final season, Brand Spanking New! Doug was renamed Disney's Doug. Most episodes from this season premiered in syndication as part of the Disney-Kellogg Alliance, with eight of the thirty-one episodes airing on ABC.

After production ended, all 65 episodes produced for Disney were repackaged under the Disney's Doug name for syndication on their Disney's One Too block, which commenced on UPN affiliates in September 1999. For the syndicated version, each episode was slightly edited, the end credits were completely redone, and new Doug shorts, featuring some of the characters from the show, were added in between commercial breaks.

Every episode of this season was directed by Bernie Denk.

No. overall	No. in season	Title	Written by	Original release date	Prod. code
87	1	"Doug's Midnight Kiss"	Glenn Leopold	September 12, 1998 (Note: This episode first aired on ABC.)	BSN-088
One of Doug's New Year's resolution is to tell Patti how he feels about her. But when Doug realizes he hasn't done that yet, he decides that giving her a kiss at Beebe's New Year's Eve party will do it. So Doug rents movies and uses balloons for practice. Meanwhile, Roger tries to break his own record of how many girls to kiss at midnight, and Judy hates all the New Year's celebration.
88	2	"Quailman VII: Quaildad"	Matt Steinglass	September 19, 1998	BSN-090
Doug is invited to a recording session with The Beets but is told to clean up his father's attic instead. He then imagines how Quailman's dad, Quaildad, would be like.
89	3	"Doug's in the Middle"	Dennis Garvey & Tommy Nichols	October 10, 1998	BSN-091
Patti and Skeeter comment about how great Guy's weekend party which makes Doug decide to have his own party. At school, Patti and Skeeter accidentally get locked in a janitor's closet after doing a favor for Ms. Krystal. While being locked in, they share a secret and promise each other not to tell anyone else. But somehow Roger finds out and he tells the whole school about Patti and Skeeter's secrets, which leaves the question of who spilled the secret.
90	4	"Doug's Older Woman"	Don Gillies	October 19, 1998 (Note: This episode first aired in Disney-Kellogg's Alliance syndication.)	BSN-087
Popular eighth grader Cassandra Bleem asks Doug to be her date at the upcoming Bluffington Blowout Bar-Becue and Beach Bash beach party and he does everything to prepare to be cool in front of Cassandra. But Patti becomes upset for Doug standing her up. Meanwhile, the Sleech twins try different kind of ways to get dates for the beach party.
91	5	"Doug Gets Right Back On!"	Mark Edward Edens & Michael Edens	October 29, 1998	BSN-089
Doug is practicing for the Rudolph Bluff Memorial Bike Rally, where he is on Patti's team and they are determined to beat Roger's team. But after Doug has a bicycle accident, he breaks his leg and once it heals, he is afraid to get back on his bike. Meanwhile, Doug learns about Mr. Dink's phobia of beans, and how he has tried to overcome it.
92	6	"Night of the Living Dougs"	Scott Kreamer	October 31, 1998	BSN-092
Beebe is having a Halloween party with a costume contest. After Doug's homemade Lucky Duck monster costume is destroyed by Dirtbike, Doug needs help for a new Halloween costume. So he goes to Skeeter, Judy, Mr. Dink, and Roger for help, but Doug can't believe they are all too busy to help him. Later in the nightmare, Doug can't believe that people all over town are turning into Doug clones.
93	7	"Doug's Dream House"	Glenn Leopold	November 2, 1998	BSN-093
While Chad is out of town, Patti comes to stay with the Funnies for a week, and Doug worries she will realize that Judy will reveal Doug's love for Patti so he tries to stop her. Meanwhile, Skeeter, Al, and Moo continue their search for the Lucky Duck Monster by using a submarine.
94	8	"Quailman Takes the Blame"	Greg Johnson	November 3, 1998	BSN-094
After Roger fakes a sprained ankle for attention and blames Doug, he imagines how Quailman would handle this situation, in which Quailman stupefies Dr. Klotzenstein, and is rushed to the hospital to recover. Quailman, Quaildog, and Silver Skeeter have to go inside Dr. Klotzenstein to save him.
95	9	"Doug and the Bluffington Five"	Don Gillies	November 4, 1998	BSN-095
A new change is coming to the Beebe Bluff Middle School... school uniforms! But all the students don't want uniforms so Sally rallies Patti, Roger, Fentruck and Beebe and forms a protest group. But after Principal White and Vice Principal Bone don't listen, Sally stages a student debate. But Sally ends up losing her voice, so Patti has to take over the debate. But it seems the power has gone to Patti's head. Meanwhile, Doug and Skeeter wonder what to do for their Civics class report.
96	10	"Quailman vs. Supersport"	Marcy Brown	November 9, 1998	BSN-096
After being beaten by Patti at several sports, Doug feels inferior and imagines how Quailman would deal with it. In the Quailman story, a new hero based on Patti named "Supersport" is introduced who uses a super-powered sports ball and saves Quailman from the evil Klotzfinger. Eventually, Quailman's jealousy of Supersport gets the best of him and the Dark Quail appears again.
97	11	"Quailman vs. the Annoying S.T.U.A.R.T."	Matt Steinglass	November 14, 1998	BSN-098
The S.T.U.A.R.T. (Society To Undermine, Annoy and Ruthlessly Torment) corporation's faulty products are making citizens in Megalopolis uncharacteristically short-tempered. After having seen enough, Quailman is once again joined by Silver Skeeter. The two of them set out to stop and confront the not-so-nice S.T.U.A.R.T. workers.
98	12	"Doug's Concert Crisis"	Betty G. Birney	November 18, 1998	BSN-097
Flounder wants to start a new group and talent searches in Bluffington. When he sees interest in Judy's "music" he starts dating her and Doug gets three tickets to Flounder and Judy's upcoming concert. At school, Doug becomes popular because he promised 20 tickets for 20 people, but he now has to risk his popularity in telling them only two tickets are available. Meanwhile, Theda gets a makeover and wonders if she should keep her new look.
99	13	"Quailman vs. the Whackhammer"	Kate Donahue	November 23, 1998	BSN-099
Doug volunteers to spend time with the residents of the Maturing Meadows retirement home. He meets Mrs. Whackhammer and doesn't make a good first impression (or a second impression). Doug turns to Quailman, to see how he would handle a monster who turns the citizens of Megalopolis grouchy.
100	14	"Judy's Big Admission"	Glenn Leopold	November 24, 1998	BSN-100
Judy auditions for an acting admission to Vole University, and she accidentally hands in Doug's doodle to the Dean. Judy ends up accepted to Vole, but only because of Doug's doodle. Judy is okay with it until the Dean asks her to draw examples for a class. Meanwhile, Doug tags along with Judy and finds out what he really wants to do with the rest of his life as he waits for the results from a drawing talent contest.
101	15	"Doug's Sour Songbird"	Marcy Brown	December 26, 1998	BSN-102
In preparation for Bluffington Pride Day, the contest to write the official Bluffington Anthem is on. Patti has written the perfect song; the only problem is she can't sing to save her life. Doug lies to Patti about her singing, which leads to her entering the contest and Doug has to tell the truth or convince Patti to drop out of the singing contest because it would only embarrass her.
102	16	"Quailman's Bad Hair Day"	Lisa Johnson	January 16, 1999	BSN-105
Doug always manages to have a bad hair day on school-picture day. So when school-picture day comes around again, Doug douses himself with hair-care products to prevent bad hair. Meanwhile, he daydreams how Quailman would handle a bad hair day, as an evil shampoo from the S.T.U.A.R.T. company is taking over the hair of all the citizens in Megalopolis.
103	17	"Quailman vs. the Quizzler"	Steve Aranguren	February 8, 1999	BSN-101
Everyone at Beebe Bluff Middle School is worried about the upcoming mysterious S.P.I.T. tests. If they fail, they could be sent back a grade...or so the rumour says. Then, Doug bumps into Mr. Bone who leaves behind the S.P.I.T. test folder. If Doug takes a look inside the folder, he can tell his friends what's on the test. Doug wonders if that's the right thing to do, then turns to Quailman. In Megalopolis, the Quizzler is stealing information and words and alphabets all over town and Quailman wants to stop and confront him. Quailman must set everything back to normal.
104	18	"Doug's Best Buddy"	Don Gillies	February 9, 1999	BSN-103
Doug's old best friend Bobby Bodingo is moving to Bluffington, and Doug can't wait to show him around school and introduce him to his friends. But Bobby just isn't the same as he used to be, he's rude and crude and even makes Doug go in the girls' bathroom. As a result, all of Doug's friends don't like him and won't spend time with Doug if Bobby is around him.
105	19	"Quailman and the Quintuple Quandary"	Joe Fallon	February 10, 1999	BSN-104
After Doug feels concerned for Mr. Dink when he gets distracted from his inventions instead of administering his Snorkeling Badge, he imagines how Quailman would handle a situation like this. Quailamn's friend Professor Quint turns to crime after his science experiments fail due to constantly doing five things at the same time. Things get worse when Quailman's advice unintentionally causes him to destroy the world, and Quailman must set him straight.
106	20	"Doug: Beebe Goes Broke"	Matt Steinglass	February 11, 1999	BSN-106
Beebe accidentally goes bankrupt. Her family is penniless due to heavy investments in the Yakestonian snoozegraffle crop, which gets completely destroyed due to a storm. Also because of the destroyed crop, Fentruck's family can't support their son overseas and will have to send him back home if he doesn't raise enough money.
107	21	"Quailman and the L.U.B."	Dennis Garvey	February 12, 1999	BSN-107
Judy forces Doug and his friends to do a Shakespearean tribute to recycling instead of a fun play they came up with on their own. Meanwhile, in Doug's daydream, Judy-dra is turning everyone in Megalopolis into performance artists and Quailman and is joined by Silver Skeeter, Material Girl (Beebe Bluff's alter-ego), Supersport (Patti Mayonnaise's alter-ego), Way Cool Man (Skunkie's alter-ego) and Pi & Pi Squared (Al & Moo's alter-egos), and must stop her and her evil alter ego, Judy-dra, a three-headed Dragon. NOTE – This episode, for unexplained reasons, was skipped over by Toon Disney.
108	22	"Patti's Dad Dilemma"	Glenn Leopold	February 22, 1999	BSN-108
Patti worries her Dad, Chad, is dating Edwina Klotz, so she does everything, including eating at Chez Honk to find out. Doug and Patti discover Chad is dating someone; but it's not Edwina, it's their teacher Ms. Krystal. When she has dinner at the Mayonnaise's, Patti feels she is trying to replace her mother. Meanwhile, Doug finds out the truth about what happened to his pet hamster as a kid.
109	23	"Quailman: The Un-Quail Saga"	Marcy Brown	February 23, 1999	BSN-109
Doug has been offered to draw a Quailman comic for the school paper, The Weekly Beebe. But the night before Doug's Quailman comic is due, Doug has not begun drawing. Meanwhile in a Quailman daydream, Rubbersuit gives out a present called Bob-i-nite and renders Quailman powerless. Quailman has lost his powers and feels he can't save Megalopolis without them, which allows Rubbersuit to steal all the beets in the entire city.
110	24	"Doug Cuts School"	Gary Apple	February 24, 1999	BSN-110
After finding out that all the girls love a rebellious actor, Doug decides to cut school during an assembly and have a wild adventure with Skeeter. But Mr. Bone finds out and although he can't tell who is cutting school, he is determined to hunt down the fugitives.
111	25	"Quailman vs. the Triad of Terror"	Don Gillies	February 25, 1999	BSN-111
An alien being named Generalissimo Twang tries to convince the three evildoers Dr. Klotzenstien, RoboBone, and the Golden Salmon that they can kill Quailman if they work together.
112	26	"Doug Plays Cupid"	Matt Steinglass	February 26, 1999	BSN-112
Roger gets Doug to teach him how to be a gentleman in order to get Beebe to ask him to go to the Bumpkin Day Hoe-Down Dance with him where the girls ask the guys. Doug hopes Patti will ask him, but she's sick, and Doug is afraid she'll ask someone else once she's better.
113	27	"Doug: I, Rubbersuit"	Joe Fallon	March 2, 1999	BSN-113
Even though he knows he is not supposed to, Doug loans Roger his school newspaper press pass so Roger can get into an early screening of a movie. But after Roger gives an insulting review of the movie to the press wearing Doug's press pass, Doug has to confront the consequences, by imagining how Quailman would handle a situation like this. In Megalopolis, the Kabrain twins help Quailman turn into Rubbersuit to learn more about him. But when the real Rubbersuit finds out about this, he visits the Kabrain twins to get them to change "Rubbersuit" back into Quailman.
114	28	"Doug's Adventures On-Line"	Don Gillies	March 20, 1999	BSN-114
While surfing the internet on the Funnie family's new computer to find music for the upcoming retro dance, Doug and Skeeter encounter Webster, a "kid" they agree to meet to exchange some records. What the boys don't know is that Webster is really "Friendly Frankie", a rather unscrupulous adult. Instead of meeting them, however, Webster/Frankie creates a distraction and steals their records. Meanwhile, Judy is online in the 'Bluffington's Pretentious Artists Chat Room,' where she meets a guy who uses the screen name 'Leonardo D'Warhol'. Believing she has met the man of her dreams, Judy arranges a meeting in person only to discover that Leonardo is not quite the man she expected.
115	29	"Quailman vs. the Little Rubber Army"	Terry M. Coudri	March 31, 1999	BSN-115
Doug is horrified to find out that Todd Bentley is going to be on his team for the Bluff Scouts hike. Todd angers Doug by messing up. A new little hero named Kid-Quail joins and clings to Quailman. Quailman has to teach Kid-Quail how to be a super hero. Rubbersuit kidnaps the children, and Quailman and Quaildog get to melt the man-made rubber.
116	30	"Doug's Grand Band Plan"	Glenn Leopold	April 9, 1999	BSN-116
For the final school dance of the school year (the Spring Fling A-Ding), Doug tells his class he can get The Beets to play at the dance, but they suddenly break up again after fighting over a banana. Meanwhile, Mr. Funnie's old band members visit the Funnie's and they decide to play at the dance when Doug invites them. But after hearing their horrible practice session, Doug has to decide if he should fire his own dad Mr. Funnie from playing at the dance and embarrassing himself.
117	31	"Doug's Marriage Madness"	Don Gillies	April 12, 1999	BSN-117
More changes in Doug's life are underway as Judy prepares to leave for college and Doug's voice begins to crack. Seventh grade is over for Doug and his friends, and to start off the summer, Mr. Mayonnaise and Ms. Krystal are getting married. Principal White is performing the ceremony and Doug is asked to carry the wedding ring, but while paying for forty goats he accidentally loses it. Convinced he gave the ring to Mr. Swirly, Doug and Skeeter ride all over town to try to find him and the ring before the wedding starts. Meanwhile at the church, Mr. Bone and Mr. Fort argue over who should get to play music at the wedding, Judy complains the stage she is performing on is too small, and one of Mr. Dink's very expensive machines goes crazy. If that wasn't enough, Roger's wedding present lands on top of the reception tent causing the tent to collapse, and Principal White faints as soon as the wedding starts. After Mr. Mayonnaise and Ms. Krystal are married, Judy drives away towards Vole, the Sleech twins get dates, Cleopatra says her first word, and Patti (now Ms. Krystal's stepdaughter) asks Doug on a date-date to the upcoming Summer Harvest Moon Festival. Doug reaches the last page of his journal. Porkchop gives Doug a new journal where he can write his new adventures to fill in.

=== Film (1999) ===
Title	Directed by	Written by	Original release date
Doug's 1st Movie	Maurice Joyce	Ken Scarborough	March 26, 1999

== See also ==
- Doug
- List of Doug characters
