= Hoyt 'n Andy's Sportsbender =

- Genre: Animated sitcom
- Created by: Jim Jinkins; Curtis Crawford; Ken Scarborough; A. L. Steele
- Developed by: Jim Jinkins; David Campbell; Joe Aaron
- Voices of: Jeff Bottoms; Bob Bottone; Jim Brownold; Loren Brown; Wendell Craig; Guy Hadley; Jackie Hoffman; Paul Kandel; Din Peoples; Chris Phillips; Doug Preis
- Composer: Dan Sawyer
- Country of origin: United States
- Original language: English
- No. of seasons: 1
- No. of episodes: 13

Production
- Executive producers: Jim Jinkins; David Campbell
- Producer: Melanie Grisanti
- Running time: 22–23 minutes
- Production companies: Jumbo Pictures; ESPN; Sony Wonder

Original release
- Network: ESPN (cancelled)

Hoyt 'n Andy's Sportsbender is an American adult animated sitcom parodying sports telecasts that was initially intended to air on ESPN in November 1995, but Disney's acquisition of then-parent Capital Cities/ABC caused the series to be cancelled before it was even shown. The series eventually aired on foreign stations and, more recently, on YouTube.

== Premise ==
The series revolves around Hoyt and Andy, two die-hard sports fanatics, who host SportsBender (a parody of SportsCenter) on ASN (All Sport Network), a cable sports channel. The series juggles topics such as corruption, media manipulation, sexism and inculture among sports fanatics.

== Production ==
ESPN announced the series to the public in July 1995 as its first foray into animation, with a November launch date. It was ESPN's first attempt at an animated series. The series was aiming at a niche audience, but an Orlando Sentinel reported noted that it could gain a following among real world sports commentators while comparing the series to morning shows on sports radio stations. ESPN Vice President John Wildack called the show "a real departure" for the network, but noted the success of adult animated series such as The Simpsons and Nickelodeon's The Ren & Stimpy Show.

The premiere was later delayed to December 25, but days ahead of the new date, ESPN announced that the series was "postponed indefinitely". Nonetheless, the series was still listed on newspapers, implying that the information received was outdated.

The series ultimately ended up airing on international syndication. In Spain, the series aired on Canal+ under the title Los superdeportistas (Super Sportsmen). In Singapore, the series aired on Premiere 12 in 1997, to finish its weekend block of sports programming.

The rights to the series are currently held by German distributor Studio 100 International, owned by the Belgian Studio 100 conglomerate.
