= Melissa Greenspan =

American actress

- Occupation: Actress
- Years active: 1993–present
- Known for: Desperate Housewives; Providence
- Website: melissagreenspan.com

Melissa Greenspan is an American actress. On television, she is known for her recurring roles as Kim on Providence and as Cindy on the Desperate Housewives. She also appeared in Party of Five, Saved by the Bell: The New Class, Beverly Hills 90210, Charmed, Parenthood, Good Girls Revolt, 9-1-1, American Housewife and Good Girls. In film she appeared in Repli-Kate (2002), St. Vincent (2014), The Poison Rose (2019), The Comeback Trail (2020) and BigBug (2022).

Greenspan is also known as a voice actress. She done voice work in Doug from 1993 to 1999 and its 1999 movie Doug's 1st Movie. She also voiced Sarah Wellington in The Wild Thornberrys Movie (2002).

== Selected filmography ==
=== Television ===
- 1996–1999 Disney's Doug as Sally, Briar Langolier, Cassandra Bleem (voices) (unknown episodes)
- 1997 Boston Common as Photo Assistant (1 episode)
- 1997 Party of Five as Joette (3 episodes)
- 1997 Saved by the Bell: The New Class as Ernestine (2 episodes)
- 1999 Beverly Hills 90210 as Zoe (1 episode)
- 1999 3rd Rock from the Sun as The Maid (1 episode)
- 2000 Diagnosis Murder as Ellie Rose (2 episodes)
- 2002 Providence as Kim (5 episodes)
- 2003 Charmed as Flo (1 episode)
- 2010 $#*! My Dad Says as Announcer (1 episode)
- 2011 Paul the Male Matchmaker as Tina (1 episode)
- 2011 Man Up as Vicki Barker (1 episode)
- 2011 Desperate Housewives as Cindy (4 episodes)
- 2012 Parenthood as Val Watson (2 episodes)
- 2014 Kirby Buckets as Ms. Statsky (1 episode)
- 2015 NCIS as Mother (1 episode)
- 2016 Good Girls Revolt as Shira (2 episodes)
- 2017 How to Beat Your Sister-in-Law (at everything) as Melissa (12 episodes)
- 2020 Modern Family as Debra (1 episode)
- 2021–2023 The Way of the Househusband as Hibari Torii (voice) (5 episodes)
- 2023 Gamera Rebirth as Boco's mother (voice) (5 episodes)
- 2024 Mr. Birchum as Bentley (voice) (3 episodes)

=== Film ===
- 1997 Laws of Deception as Hostess
- 1998 Life Is a Sweet as Unknown
- 1998 Matter of Trust as Sara
- 1999 Doug's 1st Movie (voice) as Briar Langolier
- 2000 Diamond Men as Krystal
- 2000 Enemies of Laughter as Young Woman
- 2002 Repli-Kate as Brandi
- 2002 The Wild Thornberrys Movie as Sarah Wellington (voice)
- 2005 A Distant Thunder as Female Announcer On Radio
- 2006 Final Move as Kathy Briggs
- 2006 Boyfriend as Partygoer
- 2009 Curious George 2: Follow That Monkey! as Phone Operator (voice)
- 2021 Senior Moment as Officer Nancy

=== Video games ===
- 2007 Spider-Man 3 as Additional Voices
- 2013 Grand Theft Auto V as The Local Population
- 2024 Final Fantasy VII as Additional Voices
