= Doug (TV series) =

American animated sitcom (1991–1999)

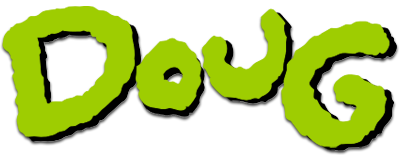
- Also known as: Brand Spanking New! Doug (seasons 5–6)
- Genre: Animated sitcom
- Created by: Jim Jinkins
- Developed by: Jim Jinkins; David Campbell; Joe Aaron
- Voices of: Billy West (seasons 1–4); Thomas Lyons (Note: Credited as Thomas McHugh.) (seasons 5–7); Fred Newman; Chris Phillips (seasons 5–7); Constance Shulman; Becca Lish; Eddie Korbich; Alice Playten; Doug Preis
- Theme music composer: Fred Newman
- Composers: Dan Sawyer; Fred Newman
- Countries of origin: United States; France (seasons 2–4)
- Original language: English
- No. of seasons: 7
- No. of episodes: 117 (166 segments) (list of episodes)

Production
- Executive producers: Jumbo Pictures: Jim Jinkins; David Campbell; Christine Martin; David Martin; Nickelodeon (seasons 1–4): Vanessa Coffey; Mary Harrington
- Producers: Jumbo Pictures: Melanie Grisanti; Ellipse Programme (seasons 2–4): Nicolas Pesques
- Running time: 22–23 minutes
- Production companies: Jumbo Pictures; Ellipse Programme (seasons 2–4); Walt Disney Television (seasons 5–7)

Original release
- Network: Nickelodeon
- Release: August 11, 1991 – January 2, 1994
- Network: ABC
- Release: September 7, 1996 – March 20, 1999
- Network: Syndication
- Release: October 19, 1998 – April 12, 1999

Doug is an American animated sitcom created by Jim Jinkins and produced by Jumbo Pictures. It originally aired on Nickelodeon from August 11, 1991, to January 2, 1994. The Disney seasons would air on ABC from September 7, 1996, to March 20, 1999, with several episodes airing in syndication from October 19, 1998, to April 12, 1999. The show focuses on the early adolescent life and zany hijinks of its eponymous character, Doug Funnie, who experiences common predicaments while attending school in his new hometown of Bluffington. Doug narrates each story in his journal, and the show incorporates many imagination sequences. The series addresses numerous topics, including trying to fit in, platonic and romantic relationships, self-esteem, bullying, and rumors. Many episodes center on Doug's attempts to impress his classmate and crush, Patti Mayonnaise.

Jinkins developed Doug from drawings in his sketchbook that he created over the course of the 1980s. Doug, a mostly autobiographical creation, was largely inspired by Jinkins's childhood growing up in Virginia, with most characters in the series being based on real individuals. He first pitched Doug as a children's book to uninterested publishers before Nickelodeon purchased the show. Following this, the series underwent further development, in which Jinkins meticulously detailed every aspect of the show's setting. Jinkins was insistent that the series would have a purpose and instructed writers to annotate each script with a moral. The show's unusual soundtrack consists largely of scat singing and mouth noises.

The series premiered on the cable network Nickelodeon, as the first of the original three Nicktoons alongside two other original animated series, Rugrats (which premiered directly after Doug) and The Ren & Stimpy Show (which premiered directly after Rugrats). The original run consisted of a total of 52 episodes over four seasons that were broadcast from 1991 to 1994, with Ellipse Programmé co-producing the run beginning in the second season. Due to MTV Networks opting against renewing the show for a fifth season, it sold the Doug intellectual property back to Jumbo Pictures. Subsequently, Jumbo Pictures was itself acquired in February 1996 by The Walt Disney Company. Immediately afterwards, the show was green-lit for a total of 65 episodes over three more seasons. Jinkins made several creative changes during this time. The show moved to ABC's Saturday morning lineup and was now produced in conjunction with Walt Disney Television. In 1998, Disney's Doug would begin airing in syndication. It immediately became a top-rated show, inspiring various books, merchandise, a live musical stage show, and a theatrical feature, Doug's 1st Movie, released as the series' conclusion in 1999. The series has seen multiple home video releases during its entire run.

== Premise ==
The series revolves around Douglas "Doug" Funnie, an 11 (later 12)-year-old boy who wants to be another face in the crowd, but by possessing a vivid imagination and a strong sense of right and wrong, he is more likely to stand out. He keeps a journal, which he treats as an autobiography, as he records numerous experiences over the series, which range from learning to dance to getting a bad haircut. Doug Funnie and his family (which consists of his parents Theda and Phil, sister Judy, and dog Porkchop) move from the town of Bloatsburg to Bluffington after his dad receives a job promotion. Bluffington is in the United States but not in any specific U.S. state. However, Bluffington is loosely based on the city of Richmond, Virginia, where creator Jim Jinkins was born and raised.

== Episodes ==
Season	Segments	Episodes		Originally released		
Season	Segments	Episodes		First released	Last released	Network
1	25	13		August 11, 1991	December 8, 1991	Nickelodeon
2	26	13		September 13, 1992	December 6, 1992	Nickelodeon
3	26	13		April 11, 1993	July 11, 1993	Nickelodeon
4	24	13		September 26, 1993	January 2, 1994	Nickelodeon
5	—N/a	26		September 7, 1996	March 22, 1997	ABC
6	—N/a	8		September 13, 1997	November 22, 1997	ABC
7	—N/a	31	8	September 12, 1998	March 20, 1999	ABC
7	—N/a	31	23	October 19, 1998	April 12, 1999	Syndication
Film				March 26, 1999		—N/a

== Characters ==
Beyond the title character, Doug features a large ensemble cast of characters. Many of the series' ancillary characters, among them Ms. Wingo and Mr. Spitz, are based on authority figures from Jinkins' childhood.

- Doug Funnie (voiced by Billy West from seasons 1–4, Thomas Lyons from seasons 5–7): Doug is depicted as a shy, insecure, self-conscious, and gullible 11 (later 12)-year-old boy who more often than not tries to deal with his fear of failure. He has talents for writing, drawing, making music (he plays a banjo), and caring for animals (he owns a dog named Porkchop). While Doug just wants to fit in with his peers, he has a vivid imagination and an unparalleled sense of morality that both make him stand out amongst them. Doug narrates every episode and writes his experiences in his journal. He has an alter ego, Quailman, who was inspired by Jinkins's and Roberts's childhood home movies in which they posed as superheroes. Billy West, the original voice behind Doug, was assigned by executive Vanessa Coffey, to Jinkins's initial reluctance, but Jinkins would eventually come to view it as the best possible voice for the character. West, in recording lines for Doug, noted that "There's a lot of me in there, because I'm going through my own experiences in there, because I have a conscience."
- Porkchop (voiced by Fred Newman): Doug's anthropomorphic pet Bull Terrier who is one of Doug's sidekicks and accompanies him nearly everywhere he goes. He sometimes assists Doug in making decisions and acts as his conscience. Porkchop is very talented in many things such as acting. He lives in an igloo-shaped doghouse in the Nickelodeon series, and a tipi in the Disney series. During a Christmas special, it is shown that Doug got Porkchop as a Christmas gift and that Porkchop once saved Beebe Bluff's life when she was about to fall through some thin ice. Porkchop, along with Doug, originally first appeared in ID spots for the USA Network children's block, USA Cartoon Express.
- Mosquito "Skeeter" Valentine (voiced by Fred Newman): Skeeter is Doug's blue-skinned best friend. He is a normal boy who is more sociable than Doug, though he occasionally makes honking noises. Skeeter and his family have lived in Bluffington for some time, so he helps Doug acclimate to Bluffington. For example, Skeeter helps Doug order food at the popular Bluffington restaurant Honker Burger in the series premiere (resulting in their friendship). The character was based on Jinkins' high school best friend, Tommy Roberts.
- Patti Mayonnaise (voiced by Constance Shulman): Patti is an intelligent, lovely, talented, and athletic girl who is Doug's female best friend and love interest. She is kind and helpful, but she does have weaknesses, such as a tendency to be competitive, being gullible, and to anger easily if pushed too far. Jinkins based the character on his adolescent crush from junior high and high school, and culled her name from two girls from his childhood, Pam Mayo and a girl named Patty.
- Roger M. Klotz (voiced by Billy West in the Nickelodeon seasons, Chris Phillips in the Disney seasons): Roger is Doug's green-skinned nemesis, and a school bully. However, he is not prominently shown as an actual bully, instead having mischievous tendencies, playing practical jokes on characters. He is older than others in his class, as it took him three years to graduate from sixth grade. Roger has a crush on Doug's sister Judy and in certain episodes tries to woo her. Roger and his divorced mother lived in a trailer park in the Nickelodeon series; in the Disney series, Roger's family becomes wealthy from a real-estate deal struck between the owner of the trailer park and the Bluff family. Roger was inspired from a bully who lived in the same neighborhood as Jinkins. He adopted the bully's neighbors' last name, Klotz, for the character.
- Beebe Bluff (voiced by Alice Playten): The heiress to the Bluff family fortune. Beebe is the daughter of Bill Bluff, the richest man in the town and a friend of Mayor White. The Bluff family is the namesake of the town of Bluffington, and in the second series, the school is even named after Beebe. Despite a certain air of superiority over her peers, Beebe maintains friendships with Patti Mayonnaise and most of her other contemporaries. Doug had his first kiss with her in the episode "Doug's Secret Admirer", although it was out of gratitude rather than love, since she already has a crush on Skeeter. Beebe was Alice Playten's final animated role before her death in 2011.
- Judith "Judy" Anastasia Funnie (voiced by Becca Lish): Judy Funnie is Doug's older sister. Judy is very intelligent and especially dramatic. Unsurprisingly, she attends the Moody School, a school for artistically talented teenagers. Judy often gives or directs performances at Bluffington Elementary, which Doug initially dreads out of fear that Judy will embarrass him (as she has done in the past). Judy is usually seen wearing only purple and black, and rarely takes off her beret or her sunglasses. She has a very strong beatnik personality. Her actress, Becca Lish, also voices Doug's mother, Theda Funnie, his friend Connie Benge, bass player Wendy Nespah of Doug's favorite band The Beets, the hairdresser Fluke and many other characters.
- Chalky Studebaker (voiced by Doug Preis): Chalky is considerably the most athletic of Doug's main circle of friends, and he is an excellent student. He wants to follow the footsteps of his older brother, Cliff.
- Connie Benge (voiced by Becca Lish): A naive schoolgirl who is best friends with Patti and Beebe, and also one of Doug's friends. She had a small crush on Doug in the Nickelodeon series. Although she was rather heavy-set in the first series, she lost weight between the two series and received a new wardrobe and hairstyle after going to a beauty camp for the summer, making her look quite different in either show. In certain episodes of the first series, the color schemes for Connie's hair and skin are switched, giving her lime green hair and violet skin instead of indigo hair and pale green skin.
- Al and Moo Sleech (voiced by Eddie Korbich): Nerdy twin brothers and two of Doug's best friends. Doug looks to them for technical help whenever he needs it. They tend to speak to each other using their own "twin language" using numbers for various words and phrases. In the Disney series, they skip all of the middle school grades and enter high school, but they maintain their relationships with Doug and others. They are each shown to have a crush on Judy. The two try to hide the fact that their father is not as intelligent as they are and is a hardworking doughnut baker.
- Mr. Bud Dink (voiced by Fred Newman): A slightly odd, purple-skinned, retiree who lives next door to the Funnies with his wife and foil, Tippy (voiced by Doris Belack). Doug frequently approaches Mr. Dink for advice, but sometimes it is useless. He and his wife's last name comes from an acronym: Dual Income, No Kids, which supports Mr. Dink's spending on various things he claims as "very expensive". In later Nickelodeon episodes, Mrs. Dink becomes mayor of Bluffington, a role she continues in the Disney version.

== Production ==
=== Development ===
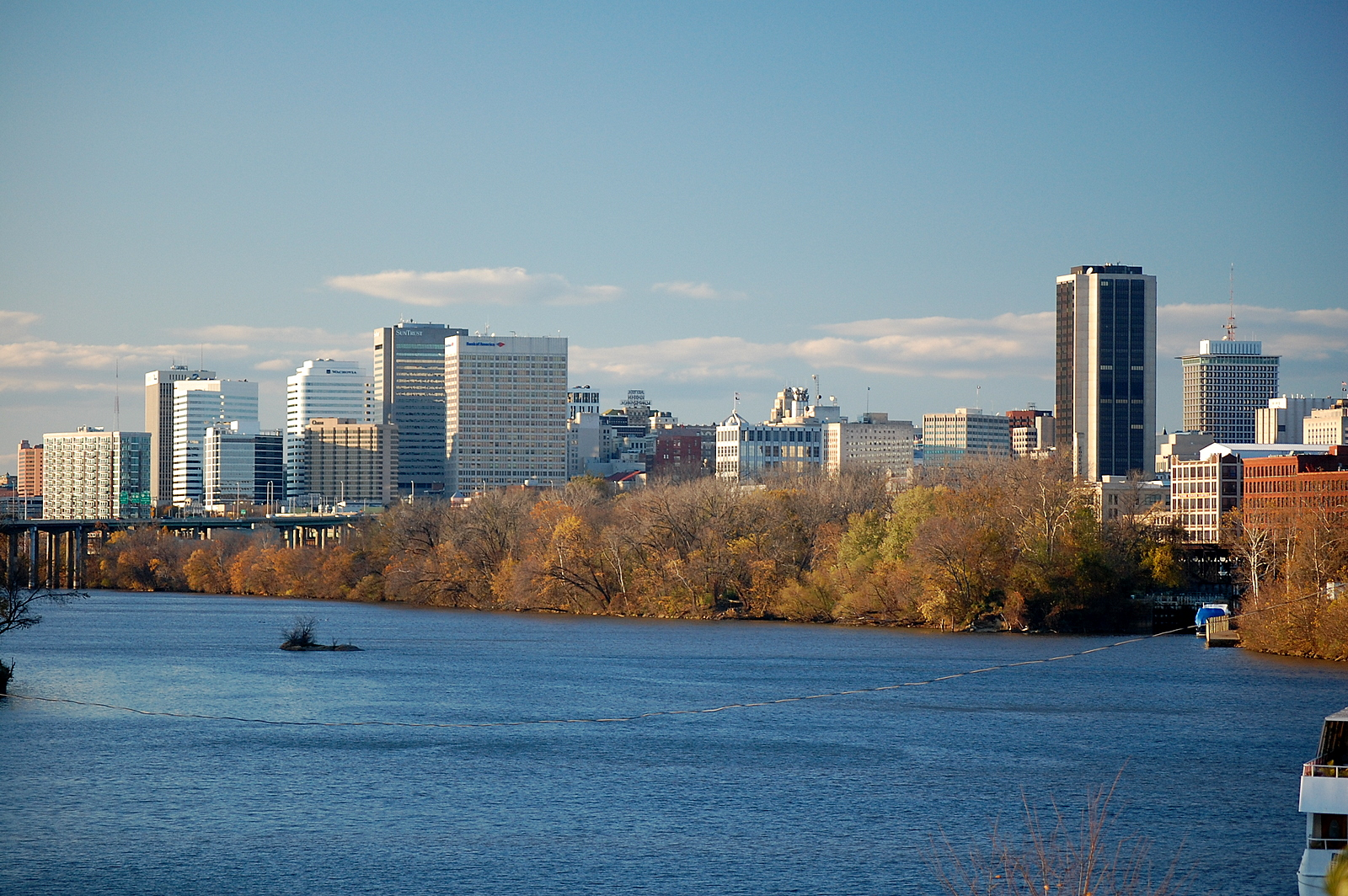
Creator Jim Jinkins based the series on his hometown of Richmond, Virginia.

Doug was created by animator Jim Jinkins. He was born in Richmond, Virginia in 1953, and grew up fascinated by drawing. He went on to animation and filmmaking at Ohio State University, and upon graduation, got a job working at PBS in their children's programming unit. Jinkins first sketched the character of Doug while doodling without thought, not aiming to create a character based on himself. In the 1980s, he began working on an autobiographical character named Brian, which he later changed to Doug, as it was a very common name. He began to view the character as his "alter-ego", drawing him in various silly and occasionally cynical scenarios in his sketchbook.

In 1984, Jinkins's career took a turn for the worse, as well as his personal life: he had a rough breakup and suffered injuries in a biking accident. During this time, he gained a new outlook on life. Desiring to "create a place where there was no overdue rent and no delinquent phone bills," he began doodling and formed the basis for Bluffington, the central location in Doug. The character's early designs were solidified alongside friend David Campbell at a small Mexican restaurant in New York. He later credited the character's odd coloring choices from being in a "margarita stupor". Campbell suggested he make Doug into a children's book, titled Doug Got a New Pair of Shoes, which was rejected by all of the city's publishing houses. Simon & Schuster was interested, but management changed before it purchased the pitch. The character made its first animated appearance in a 1988 Florida Grapefruit Growers commercial, and it was also used for a 1989 promotional bumper for the USA Network.

Meanwhile, cable network Nickelodeon, aiming to expand its content and find creative auteurs, began a search for animators to develop their first original animated series. This was very unusual for the time period, which often consisted of pre-licensed characters, such as Teenage Mutant Ninja Turtles and Where's Waldo?. Jinkins had actually worked at the network before it was renamed Nickelodeon; he was employed in the late 1970s, on their first show Pinwheel. Jinkins set up a meeting with executive Vanessa Coffey to show her the book prototype. Coffey ran out of the room ("which is, you know, disturbing," Jinkins would recall), but only to inform her boss that "This [Jinkins] guy is the real deal, and we're taking him to pilot." Employing voice artists and writers from New York, Jinkins created a pilot for Doug, titled Doug Can't Dance. It was one of three six-minute pilots chosen out of eight to premiere as Nickelodeon's debut animated series, or Nicktoons. It also tested the highest out of eight that were shown to test audiences, scoring the highest of eight points. The long contract development took nearly a year to complete. Jinkins made sure that his contract allowed him to take the series to another network if Nickelodeon did not complete the show's order.

In another unusual move, Nickelodeon allowed their purchased pilots to be animated at independent studios. Jinkins and Campbell founded Jumbo Pictures in July 1990 to produce Doug. He would later recall the oddity of the deal, remarking, "that was a moment in time where we were able to be an independent production company and deliver those shows." Coffey was the main executive in charge of the series' production, and Jinkins would later give her credit in bringing the show to air. The pilot was a success, as Nickelodeon happily decided to greenlight production for the first season in August 1990, scheduling it for exactly a year in advance. The plan was to make 26 segments, but pair up 2 each to make up the 30-minute runtime of programming.

=== Writing and design ===
Jinkins characterized the series as not entirely autobiographical, but emotionally accurate to his childhood experiences. The show was designed and based on his experiences growing up in Virginia, designing it as such to give the viewers "a roller coaster of emotions." Each character in the series was based on people from Jinkins' life, with some exaggerations. Prior to the show's premiere, Jinkins sent messages to each subject of inspiration, notifying them of their inclusion. Jinkins' religious upbringing also made its way into the series, albeit without direct reference. For example, if an episode is set on Sunday, Doug's family is dressed in their church clothes. Jinkins felt it was important to not insert overly religious themes into the series, but he viewed it essential that each episode contain a moral. The series was also inspired by Peanuts.

The show's design was labor-intensive, intended to convey a certain logic to the show's universe. Its pitch bible, which Jinkins described as "huge", contains floor plans for each main character's homes, as well as maps of each street. In addition, Jinkins and the series' developers paid particular attention to more hidden elements within the series, such as the founding fathers of the show's central town. In translating the show into animation, the characters' designs were solidified. "Jim Jinkins is an illustrator and not an animator, so his initial drawings were a little bit more of a wiggly line," said Yvette Kaplan. The designs were inspired by Jinkins' period working for R. O. Blechman at the Ink Tank, incorporating Blechman's nervous line quality.

In writing the series, the production schedule was built around spending several weeks writing the series' scripts. Jinkins asked each writer to place a central theme at the top of each script — a problem Doug deals with in life, and the lesson he learns from it. Jinkins often told staff that he wanted the show to remain relevant "in 30 years," aiming for a timeless effect. While developing the series, Jinkins wanted to change its name from Doug to The Funnies, but the network encouraged him to stick with the original name. There was a "cross-pollination" among the network's writing staff. This involved story editors being assigned to the show, among them Mitchell Kriegman of Clarissa Explains It All and Will McRobb of The Adventures of Pete & Pete. "There was definitely camaraderie and a quirkiness about who they were hiring," Jinkins later said. "Sometimes it didn't work quite so well, but working with McRobb was awesome!" McRobb, who worked with Spümcø on The Ren & Stimpy Show at the same time, called working on both shows "schizophrenic" due to the contrast between the two studios' working environment. Jumbo Pictures was relatively peaceful and conformed to what little resistance Nickelodeon executives had, while Spümcø had frequent feuds, if not necessarily aggressive conflicts with them. McRobb convinced a team at Spümcø, including John Kricfalusi and Vincent Waller, to work on layouts for a single episode of Doug; they considered the experience to be "joyless", but Kricfalusi did not mind as it brought more funding to the studio. The episode, "Doug Is Quailman/Doug Out in Left Field", was apparently vandalized by the staff with hidden Ren and Stimpy cameos, which were not visible in the final cut.

=== Music ===
Jinkins was also very involved in the show's music. One of the show's most notable elements is its unique a cappella soundtrack by voice actor Fred Newman. "Fred showed me how you could take out a guitar and use a tuna can filled with water that you'd thump with your finger," said Jinkins. The concept of making music out of anything, or making something good out of nothing, is explored in "Doug's Garage Band" (episode 38, part 2), which ends in Doug performing the song "Bangin’ on a Trashcan".

In the series, Doug's favorite rock group is The Beets, a play on the Beatles—the band's members also visually resemble caricatures of Ringo Starr (of the Beatles) and Robert Plant (of Led Zeppelin), and their penchant for endless reunion tours owes to the Who. Jinkins viewed the series' music as part of the storytelling.

Newman deliberately attempted to deviate from the standard of compositions for animated cartoons, which traditionally followed the style of Carl Stalling's work, with the frantic pacing being ill-suited for the show's slower pace. The most complicated piece of music created for the series was for the opening sequence, which was recorded preceding animation, rather than the typical method of composing it afterward. The series' theme song is largely composed of simple sounds, mostly "doo-doo" and "na-na", performed in a scat singing style with increasing intensity, and culminating in a crescendo of several harmonies. Newman's scat singing also plays over transitions in the series. The show also incorporated many homemade sound effects.

In the closing credits for the first season of Doug, two different pieces of music would play: the first piece would be taken from the second segment in the episode, and during the last third, Porkchop would don headphones and listen to music from the first segment, drowning out the original background music and annoying Doug, ending with Doug chasing Porkchop. Subsequent seasons, however, use a single piece of music for their closing credits (despite using the same animation). Beginning with the Disney episodes, the credits would use Doug chasing Porkchop to the left and right only for Porkchop to chase Doug to the left while the credits play.

=== Disney acquisition ===
Title card of Disney's Doug

The original deal required Jumbo to produce 65 episodes of Doug, which Nickelodeon would air in blocks of 13 per season. After four seasons and 52 episodes of Doug, Nickelodeon declined to order the additional 13, citing the show's expensive budget during a budget freeze. The network had a two-year window in which it could reverse the decision. The show received strong interest from several networks, among them ABC. Each time they received interest, they would notify Nickelodeon in order to speed up ordering the series' fifth season. On February 29, 1996, The Walt Disney Company, which had completed its acquisition of Capital Cities/ABC, Inc. nearly three weeks prior on February 9, acquired Jumbo Pictures in a multimillion-dollar deal with Jinkins and Campbell and even signed them both to five-year contracts, with stock options, to be Disney executives. The acquisition notably included the rights to the Doug trademark and intellectual property and to all future incarnations, such as all future series episodes and all future merchandising, of the show, which had reverted months earlier to Jumbo from MTV Networks, which itself chose to retain the rights to all prior episodes of the series.

Due to the length of time between the series' run on Nickelodeon and its beginning on ABC, there were several creative changes. Production of the series relocated from New York City to Los Angeles. This meant the voice actors recorded their lines remotely instead of together in the studio. Billy West was replaced by Tom McHugh as the voice of Doug, while the role of Roger was taken over by Chris Phillips. Disney could not afford West, as his fame had grown from voicing characters in Ren & Stimpy and other animated properties. Jinkins argues that he worked hard to keep West on the series, claiming that the deal the company offered him was breaking their budget. In 2013, despite not returning to the Disney version, West mentioned that he would be open to returning as the role/character.

Several original staff members of Doug have openly regarded the Disney run as inferior to the Nickelodeon run. Jinkins was less hands-on regarding the production of the show's Disney episodes due to other responsibilities. "I mostly agree with Doug fans who think the original 104 eleven-minute Doug stories made for Nick were the best", Jinkins later said. David Campbell felt the Nickelodeon episodes were "quirkier" and better, while Constance Shulman, Patti Mayonnaise's voice actress, felt voice recording sessions were not the same in the show's newer incarnation: "I missed all the gang crammed in the studio, waiting for their turn for the big group scene. Someone just dimmed the magic a bit."

Another factor in Doug going to Disney might have been Nickelodeon's high expectations for the series not being met, something that has been acknowledged by Jinkins as well as Ren & Stimpy creator John Kricfalusi. Among Nickelodeon's three original Nicktoons, executives were banking on Doug to be the network's breakout hit. While Doug proved to be popular, it was by far Nickelodeon's least popular original Nicktoon, as Ren & Stimpy would (alongside The Simpsons and Beavis and Butt-Head) help revive interest in the adult animation genre that had been largely dormant since The Flintstones ended in 1966. Meanwhile, Nickelodeon's other original Nicktoon, Rugrats, would instead be the network's breakout hit and would remain in production until the mid-2000s, long after the other two series ended production.

Since the acquisition, Disney has owned the rights to produce any future material in the Doug franchise. In 2016, Jinkins stated that Disney had "no interest" in revamping the show.

Doug and Porkchop appear on a billboard in the Chip 'n Dale: Rescue Rangers movie, released on Disney+ in May 2022.

In 2023, Jinkins revealed concept art he had drawn for a potential revival titled Doug Kids that would focus on the children of Doug and his friends. However, the idea was passed over by Disney executives.

== Themes ==
The series covers topics related to coming of age. According to Jinkins, honesty is the series' main theme:

We put ourselves through enormous pain to avoid pain and I had this notion of: 'What if we didn't do that? What if we just told the truth?" he said. "But that's complicated. In the adult world, the notion of truth and not-truth is complicated, but I didn't want to debate it. I didn't want to show all of the ambiguity of the adult world to kids. I wanted to show kids a world where everyone took honesty seriously."

For example, the episode "Doug's in the Money" finds the titular character coming across an envelope of cash and returning it to its elderly owner. It created a heated debate among the series' writers regarding honesty. In the episode, Doug is rewarded with a stick of gum. "It comes down to how we think about who is involved in a story. In that case, I wanted Doug to do something that hurt where there was no tangible reward," said Jinkins.

The series also made frequent use of cutaways, frequently showing Doug daydreaming certain scenarios. The use of cutaways declined during the Disney run, but was never eliminated. The technique would become much more frequently used on Family Guy, which debuted five months before the series concluded.

After the series' completion, much of the online debate ensued over the race of Doug's best friend, Skeeter, who some viewers felt exhibited traits stereotypical of African Americans, and who subsequently drew conclusions that the character was intended to be African American. Jinkins did not envision this discourse on the series' colors. When creating the show, he came across his 200 design markers and employed an array of bright, wild colors for the characters. Jinkins later told The Huffington Post in 2014 that the series' colors "came to symbolize the irrelevance of race."

== Release ==
=== Home media ===
Sony Wonder released four VHS tapes of the Nickelodeon episodes; the first two in 1993 and the last two in 1994. Walt Disney Home Video released four VHS tapes of the Disney episodes in 1997, with each tape featuring two episodes.

Nickelodeon and Amazon once teamed up to release Doug (the former's episodes only) and the former's other shows on manufacture-on-demand DVD-R discs exclusively through the latter's CreateSpace service. Seasons 3 and 4 of Doug were released on DVD on December 8, 2009, and December 22, 2009, respectively.

Season 4 was slated to be released as a complete season, but the master tapes for two episodes from the season were lost at the time, so the release was renamed as The Best of Season 4. Doug: The Complete Nickelodeon Series was released on June 26, 2014.

==== VHS ====
===== Nickelodeon =====
Title	Release date	Distributed by	Episodes	Music videos
How Did I Get Into This Mess?	August 31, 1993	Sony Wonder	"Doug's Lost Weekend"; "Doug On His Own"; "Doug's Dental Disaster"	"Killer Tofu"; "Doggie Rap"
Patti, You're the Mayonnaise for Me	August 31, 1993	Sony Wonder	"Doug Out in Left Field"; "Doug's Dinner Date"; "Doug's Fair Lady"	"Bangin' On a Trash Can"; "Shout Your Lungs Out"
Cool in School	July 26, 1994	Sony Wonder	"Doug's Cartoon"; "Doug's Doodle"; "Doug's New Teacher"	"Yo Doug!"; "I Need Mo' Allowance"
Christmas Story	August 30, 1994	Sony Wonder	"Doug's Christmas Story"	N/A
Christmas Story	October 7, 1997	Paramount Home Video	"Doug's Christmas Story"; "Doug's Fan Club"	N/A

===== Disney =====
Title	Release date	Episodes
Doug's Birthday Blues	July 15, 1997	2
Slam Dunk Doug	July 15, 1997	2
The Vampire Caper	August 26, 1997	2
Doug's Secret Christmas	October 7, 1997	2

==== DVD ====
Title	Release date	Discs	Episodes
Season 1 (1991)	August 29, 2008	3	13
Season 2 (1992)	August 29, 2008	3	13
Season 3 (1993)	December 8, 2009	3	13
The Best of Season 4 (1993–94)	December 22, 2009	3	11
The Complete Nickelodeon Series	June 26, 2014	6	52

=== Streaming ===
Currently, all of the original Nickelodeon episodes are available on video on demand services such as iTunes Store, PlayStation Network, and Amazon Prime Video, while the Disney episodes and Doug's 1st Movie are on Disney+.

=== Broadcast ===
Reruns of the Nickelodeon episodes aired on Noggin until 2002, Nicktoons until 2007, and on TeenNick's NickRewind block from 2011 to 2021. Currently, they air on Pluto TV's "90s Kids" channel as of October 2023.

Reruns of the Disney episodes aired on UPN's Disney's One Too until 2000, on Disney Channel until 2002, and on Toon Disney until 2004.

== Reception ==
The series premiered alongside Rugrats and The Ren & Stimpy Show on August 11, 1991, being scheduled first among the three series. The show was not as immediately popular as its counterparts, and Jinkins lamented to Coffey this fact: "Ren and Stimpy is getting so much attention because of [the show's creator] John Kricfalusi. I feel like the squeaky wheel gets the grease." Nickelodeon was largely attempting to push the limits of children's programming, while Doug was a much gentler, quiet show. While the Nickelodeon episodes received mostly positive reviews, the Disney episodes received a more mixed reception, and were considered to be inferior by fans of the Nickelodeon episodes.

=== Ratings ===
The new Nicktoons block on Nickelodeon raised the network's ratings instantly. Doug constantly achieved over 2.0 in the network's most desirable demographics.

When the show moved to ABC in 1996, Doug became the most popular program on ABC's Saturday morning lineup, attracting the highest ratings of any cartoon on the network. Its high-rated second season on the network contributed to its position as the number one network in Saturday morning ratings.

=== Awards and nominations ===
Doug received numerous domestic and international awards and nominations. It won two Parents' Choice Awards, two Nickelodeon Kids' Choice Awards, and was nominated for three CableACE Awards and four Daytime Emmy Awards. It was also nominated for the Prix Jeunesse International Award.

Year	Award	Category	Result	Ref.
1991	ASIFA-East Animation Festival	Best Direction	Won	
1992	Young Artist Awards	Outstanding New Animation Series	Nominated	
1992	Emmy Award	Outstanding Animated Program	Nominated	
1993	Emmy Award	Outstanding Animated Children's Program	Nominated	
1993	Ollie Awards	???	Won	
1993	CableACE Awards	Animated Programming Special or Series	Nominated	
1993	Parents' Choice Awards	???	Won	
1994	Parents' Choice Awards	???	Won	
1994	CableACE Awards	Animated Programming Special or Series	Nominated	
1994	Nickelodeon Kids' Choice Awards	Favorite Cartoon	Won	
1995	Nickelodeon Kids' Choice Awards	Favorite Cartoon	Won	
1996	Nickelodeon Kids' Choice Awards	Favorite Cartoon	Nominated	
1996	Young Artists Awards	Best Family Animation Production	Nominated	
1999	Emmy Award	Outstanding Children's Animated Program	Nominated	
2000	Emmy Award	Outstanding Children's Animated Program	Nominated	
2000	Annenberg Public Policy Center Awards	Outstanding Educational Program on a Commercial Broadcast Station	Won	

== Other media ==
=== Stage show ===
On March 15, 1999, Disney premiered a new musical stage show, Doug Live!, at Disney's Hollywood Studios (at the time known as Disney-MGM Studios) at the Walt Disney World Resort. The show ran until May 12, 2001.

=== Film ===
A theatrical feature-length film, Doug's 1st Movie, was released on March 26, 1999, before production on the television show ceased. During this time, meet-and-greet costumed versions of Doug and Patti were seen in Walt Disney World. It was received negatively by both critics and fans.

=== Video game ===
A video game developed by ImaginEngine for Game Boy Color was released by NewKidCo in association with Disney Interactive in 2000, titled Doug's Big Game.

=== Comics ===
While Doug had never received his own self-titled print media outside of books that retold events of the TV series' episodes, comics that entailed original stories were published in the magazine Disney Adventures, from Volume 7 #5 in February 1997, to Volume 12 #1 in February 2002. To date, the one-page comic "Neckerchief Grief" is the last official material that features Doug in any major capacity.

== See also ==
- List of Doug episodes
- List of Doug characters
