= Doris Belack =

American actress (1926–2011)

- Belack in 1990
- Born: February 26, 1926; New York City, U.S.
- Died: October 4, 2011 (aged 85); New York City, U.S.
- Occupation: Actress
- Years active: 1955–2011
- Spouse: Philip Rose (m. 1946; died 2011)

Doris Belack (February 26, 1926 – October 4, 2011) was an American character actress of stage, film and television.

== Early years ==
Born on February 26, 1926, in New York City, Belack was the younger child of Russian Jewish immigrant parents, Isaac and Bertha Belack; she had an older sister. She graduated from Evander Childs High School in 1943.

== Life and career ==
Belack began her acting career immediately after she graduated from high school when she began performing in a summer stock theater company. In 1945 she was a member of a touring company of Life with Father.

She was sometimes been misidentified as the first Bernice Fish, the wife of Abe Vigoda's character Fish on Barney Miller. She was actually only a one-episode replacement for actress Florence Stanley, who played the role. Before that, Belack was seen mainly in soap operas. She originated the role of Anna Wolek Craig for nearly a decade on One Life to Live. She also appeared in Another World (three different roles over several years), The Doctors (1980, as psychiatrist Dr. Claudia Howard), and The Edge of Night (1981, as Beth Bryson). Later in the 1980s, she had the recurring role of Pine Valley's mayor on All My Children.

She played the formidable soap-opera producer Rita Marshall in the 1982 comedy film Tootsie, which starred Dustin Hoffman. Her other film credits included roles in Fast Forward (1985), Batteries Not Included (1987), Splash, Too (1988), She-Devil (1989), Opportunity Knocks (1990), What About Bob? (1991), Naked Gun 33 1/3: The Final Insult (1994), Krippendorf's Tribe (1998), The Odd Couple II (1998), and Fail Safe (2000).

Belack played the lead role in the short-lived television sitcom Baker's Dozen as Florence Baker, the no-nonsense captain of an undercover anti-crime unit of the NYPD. The show lasted a month on CBS. She also guest starred on many different shows including Family Ties, The Cosby Show, Remington Steele, and Cagney & Lacey. She guest starred on an episode of The Golden Girls in 1985 as Gloria, the sister of Bea Arthur's character Dorothy Zbornak. From 1990 to 2001, Belack played tough, sharp-tongued Judge Margaret Barry, a recurring role on Law & Order and Law & Order: Special Victims Unit. She voiced Maureen McReary in Grand Theft Auto IV and provided the voices of Mrs. Dink and Mrs. Wingo in the Nickelodeon show Doug. Her last television appearance was on a 2003 episode of Sex and the City.

== Personal life and death ==
Her husband, producer Philip Rose, died on May 31, 2011, four months before her own death. They were married for 65 years and had no children.

Belack died on October 4, 2011, in New York City, aged 85.

== Filmography ==
=== Film ===
- Looking Up (1977) - Libby Levine
- The Black Marble (1980) - Harried Woman
- Hanky Panky (1982) - Building Manager
- Tootsie (1982) - Rita Marshall
- Fast Forward (1985) - Mrs. Gilroy
- Batteries Not Included (1987) - Mrs. Thompson
- The Luckiest Man in the World (1989) - Mrs. Posner
- She-Devil (1989) - Paula
- Opportunity Knocks (1990) - Mona
- What About Bob? (1991) - Dr. Catherine Tomsky
- Naked Gun 33 1/3: The Final Insult (1994) - Dr. Roberts
- What's Your Sign? (1997)
- Krippendorf's Tribe (1998) - President Porter
- The Odd Couple II (1998) - Blanche Madison Povitch
- Doug's 1st Movie (1999) - Mayor Tippi Dink (voice)
- Prime (2005) - Blanche
- Delirious (2006) - Les's mother
- Arranged (2007) - Elona (final film role)

=== Television ===
Doris Belack' television credits
Year	Title	Role	Notes
1965	For The People	The Policewoman	Episode: "Any Benevolent Purpose"
1968–1977	One Life to Live	Anna Wolek Craig #1 / Anna Wolek Craig / Anna Craig / Anna Wolek / Anna Craig Wolek	821 episodes (regular role)
1975	Barney Miller	Bernice Fish	Episode: "Fish"
1978	On Our Own	Nurse Pressiosa	Episode: "When a Body Meets a Body"
1978	The Last Tenant	Housekeeper	Television film
1980	Family	Dr. Derwin	Episode: "When the Bough Breaks"
1980	The Jilting of Granny Weatherall	Olive	Television film
1980	When the Whistle Blows	—N/a	Episode: "Pilot"
1980	The Doctors	Dr. Claudia Howard	22 episodes (regular role)
1981	We're Fighting Back	Doctor	Television film
1982	The Edge of Night	Beth Bryson	41 episodes (regular role)
1982	Baker's Dozen	Captain Florence Baker	6 episodes
1983	The Cradle Will Fall	Edna Burns	Television film
1983	Sessions	—N/a	Television film
1984	Emerald Point N.A.S.	Nancy Frost	Uncredited; Episode: "The Wedding"
1984	Family Ties	Mrs. Willis	Episode: "Fabric Smarts"
1984	The Cosby Show	Saleswoman	Episode: "Father's Day"
1984–1985	Remington Steele	Rose Myrtle / Rose	2 episodes
1985	Cagney & Lacey	Mrs. Harkins	Episode: "American Dream"
1985	The Hearst and Davies Affair	Louella Parsons	Television film
1985	Off The Rack	—N/a	Episode: "Here Comes the Bribe"
1985	Scarecrow and Mrs. King	Mrs. Courtney	Episode: "Vigilante Mothers"
1985	Hollywood Beat	—N/a	Episode: "Pilot"
1985	Hometown	Alice Bender	Episode: "Mary's Yen"
1985	The Golden Girls	Gloria Petrillo	Episode: "The Custody Battle"
1986	Mr. Belvedere	Customer #2	Episode: "The Will"
1986	Mary	Norma Tucker	Episode: "Little Jo"
1987	The Equalizer	Dorian	Episode: "High Performance"
1987	Almost Partners	Anna McCue	Television film
1988	Hostage	Edna	Television film
1988	Splash, Too	Lois Needler	Television film
1988	Baby Boom	Lois Elkman	Episode: "Little Jo"
1989	Anything but Love	Dorothy Gold	Episode: "Dorothy Dearest"
1991	Absolute Strangers	Fran	Television film
1991–1994	Doug	Tippi Dink / Mrs. Wingo / Ruby Valentine	Voice role 52 episodes (regular role)
1992	Mathnet	Broadway Annie Rose	Episode: "The Case of the Smart Dummy"
1992	Laurie Hill	Beverly Fielder	10 episodes
1993	Lifestories: Families In Crisis	Judge Cohen	Episode: "The Case of the Smart Dummy"
1993	Family Album	Lillian Lerner	6 episodes
1994	Picket Fences	Justice Ginsburg	Episode: "May It Please the Court"
1995	Chicago Hope	Mrs. Taubler	Episode: "Heartbreak"
1995	Sisters	Shirley Nuesbaum / Naomi Margolis	2 episodes
1998	Touched by an Angel	Elaine Weiss	Episode: "Elijah"
2000	Fail Safe	Mrs. Johnson	Television film
2000–2001	Law & Order: Special Victims Unit	Margaret Barry / Trial Judge Margaret Barry	3 episodes

=== Stage ===
Year	Title	Role	Notes
1960	Semi-Detached	Simone	Martin Beck Theatre, Broadway
1962	P.S. 193	Irene Kobitz	Writers' Stage Theatre, Off-Broadway
1966	Nathan Weinstein, Mystic, Connecticut	Deborah Wang	Brooks Atkinson Theatre, Broadway
1967	The Ninety Day Mistress	Phyllis	Biltmore Theatre, Broadway
1969	Last of the Red Hot Lovers	Elaine Navazio (Standby)	Eugene O'Neill Theatre, Broadway
1974	Bad Habits	April Pitt (Understudy)/Dolly Scupp (Understudy)	Booth Theatre, Broadway
1977	The Trip Back Down	Barbara Horvath	Longacre Theatre, Broadway
1978	Cheaters	Grace (Standby)/Monice (Standby)	Biltmore Theatre, Broadway
1979	Letters Home	Aurelia	American Place Theatre, Off-Broadway
1988	Emerald City	Elaine Ross	Perry Street Theatre, Off-Broadway
1990	The Cemetery Club	Doris	Brooks Atkinson Theatre, Broadway
2002	Surviving Grace	Grace Griswald	Union Square Theatre, Off-Broadway
2005	The Taste Test	Claire	Virginia Stage Company
2006	The Right Kind of People	Mrs. Goldberg/Betty Butler	59E59 Theater, Off-Broadway
