= Doug's 1st Movie =

1999 animated film directed by Maurice Joyce

- Theatrical release poster
- Directed by: Maurice Joyce
- Written by: Ken Scarborough
- Based on: Doug by Jim Jinkins
- Produced by: Jim Jinkins; David Campbell; Melanie Grisanti; Jack Spillum
- Starring: Tom McHugh; Fred Newman; Chris Phillips; Constance Shulman; Frank Welker; Doug Preis; Guy Hadley; Alice Playten; Doris Belack
- Edited by: Alysha Cohen; Christopher Gee
- Music by: Mark Watters
- Production companies: Walt Disney Television Animation; Jumbo Pictures
- Distributed by: Buena Vista Pictures Distribution (Note: Distributed under the Walt Disney Pictures banner.)
- Release date: March 26, 1999
- Running time: 77 minutes
- Country: United States
- Language: English
- Budget: $5 million
- Box office: $19.4 million

Doug's 1st Movie is a 1999 American animated comedy film based on the television series Doug created by Jim Jinkins. Directed by Maurice Joyce and written by Ken Scarborough, the film stars the regular television cast of Tom McHugh, Fred Newman, Chris Phillips, Constance Shulman, Frank Welker, Alice Playten, Guy Hadley, and Doris Belack. The plot follows Doug Funnie and Skeeter Valentine as they try to save a friendly monster, found in Lucky Duck Lake, from Bill Bluff, all while Doug tries to juggle his romance with Patti Mayonnaise and competition from Guy Graham before the school's Valentine's Day dance.

The film was released by Walt Disney Pictures on March 26, 1999; the theatrical release was accompanied by the Mickey Mouse Works short, Donald's Dynamite: Opera Box. Although the film received mixed-to-negative reviews from critics, it grossed $19.4 million worldwide making it a moderate success. No further Doug feature films were produced after.

== Plot ==
Before the Valentine's Day dance, Doug Funnie and Skeeter Valentine search Lucky Duck Lake for a monster they suspect lives there. It follows them to Skeeter's house, where they name him Herman Melville after he tries to eat a copy of Moby-Dick. Doug and Skeeter show Herman Melville to Mr. Dink and Mayor Tippy Dink who warns them that Bluffco will kill the story if they try to get it to the press, Bluffco having been responsible for dumping waste into Lucky Duck Lake. She says instead, they need to call a press conference that Bill Bluff cannot stop. Until then, they need to keep Herman Melville a secret for his own safety.

After trying to apologize to love interest Patti Mayonnaise for failing to meet up with her, Doug blurts out he has proof that the lake is being polluted and that he plans to expose what Bluff is doing to the lake to Guy Graham, the head of the school paper. While initially dismissive, Guy finds a picture of Herman Melville and, realizing Doug is telling the truth, notifies Bluff.

At school, Patti forgives Doug, and says she and Guy will be at the press conference. Bluff sends agents to Doug's house to capture Herman Melville, but end up in the wrong garage. After another call from Guy, Bluff tries again, with agents disguised as reporters. While Skeeter tells how he met Herman Melville, Mr. Dink sees that the conference isn't being broadcast live, and Doug gets suspicious. Going outside, he discovers that the reporters are fakes. Called to the podium, Doug claims they are making a big mistake, with Patti now believing him to be a liar.

Meanwhile, in a scheme to create his own monster, Roger Klotz hires a group of nerds including Al and Moo Sleech to build a robot for him, but instead it becomes very overbearing toward Roger. Bluff has agents break into Doug's house and follow him to school. Doug disguises Herman Melville as a foreign exchange student called Hermione. Patti becomes even more hurt from all the attention he gives Hermione, and leaves with Guy. Later that night, Doug and Skeeter try to release Herman Melville back into the lake, but Herman Melville refuses, revealing how acidic the lake has become. They are ambushed by Bluff and his agents, who capture Herman Melville.

Doug realizes everything was his fault because he was using Herman Melville to impress Patti, and that this was his last chance to save him. In the school newspaper office, Doug and Skeeter find an article by Guy detailing how the monster attacked students at the upcoming Valentine's Day dance and was killed by Bluff. Doug and Skeeter recruit Al and Moo to help rescue Herman Melville and release him into the unpolluted Crystal Lake. On the night of the dance, Doug gives up his last chance to win Patti back in order to save Herman Melville. The Sleeches reprogram Roger's robot to act like the monster in Guy's article, distracting everyone while Doug and Skeeter grab Herman Melville and sneak him out of the dance. Patti sees them leave, and Guy tries to make himself look good by announcing he had alerted the Bluffco agents.

Doug and Skeeter bring Herman Melville to Crystal lake and release him into the fresh waters, where they are confronted and threatened by Bluff. However Bluff's daughter Beebe and Mayor Dink overhear Bluff's tirade, and Beebe defends both Doug and Skeeter while Mayor Dink strongly suggests he discuss his pollution problems with her. Doug tries to apologize to Patti, who realizes Doug was telling the truth all along after Herman Melville reveals himself. She sees the article Guy wrote, and knocks him into the lake for lying to her. After the gang says goodbye to Herman Melville, Doug tries to reveal his feelings for Patti, only for Roger to suddenly appear, thanking him for getting rid of his robot, which then returns and chases him away. Bluff concedes defeat by agreeing to clean up Lucky Duck Lake. The movie ends with Doug and Patti, Skeeter and Beebe, slow dancing on the dock by the lake.

== Voice cast ==
- Tom McHugh as Doug Funnie, Lincoln
- Fred Newman as Skeeter Valentine, Mr. Dink, Porkchop, Ned
- Chris Phillips as Roger Klotz, Boomer, Larry, Mr. Chiminy
- Constance Shulman as Patti Mayonnaise
- Frank Welker as Herman Melville
- Alice Playten as Beebe Bluff, Elmo (this would be her final role in an animated movie before her death in 2011)
- Guy Hadley as Guy Graham
- Doug Preis as Mr. Funnie, Mr. Bluff, Willie, Chalky, Bluff Agent
- Eddie Korbich as Al & Moo Sleech, Robocrusher
- David O'Brien as Quailman Announcer
- Doris Belack as Mayor Tippi Dink
- Becca Lish as Judy Funnie, Mrs. Funnie, Connie
- Greg Lee as Principal White
- Bob Bottone as Bluff Assistant
- Bruce Bayley Johnson as Mr. Swirly
- Fran Brill as Mrs. Elaine Perigrew
- Melissa Greenspan as Briar Langolier

=== Additional voice artists ===
- Rodger Bumpass as Green Police Officer
- Paul Eiding as Red Police Officer
- Jackie Gonneau as Kid #1
- Sherry Lynn as Kid #2
- Mickie McGowan as Lunch Lady
- Phil Proctor as Brian the A/V Nerd
- Brianne Siddall as Kid #3
- Claudette Wells as Kid #4

== Production ==
Nickelodeon was originally making a Doug film adaptation in May 1993 when they made a deal with 20th Century Fox to make films based on their properties along with films like Rugrats and Ren & Stimpy. However, the plans evaporated when Viacom acquired Paramount Pictures in February 1994, and the deal expired in the following year. Only The Rugrats Movie materialized in November 1998.

In February 1996, when Disney bought Jumbo Pictures along with the cartoon, they decided to revive the project for the Doug film. This film was originally planned as a direct-to-video release under the title The First Doug Movie Ever as shown in trailers, but due to the success of The Rugrats Movie, they decided to make it a theatrical release instead and the title was changed to Doug's 1st Movie.

This is the last American theatrical animated film to use traditional cels; the title sequence used digital ink and paint.

== Release ==
The film was theatrically released with the short Opera Box, featuring Donald and Daisy Duck, from the television series Mickey Mouse Works.

On the review aggregator website Rotten Tomatoes, 28% of 36 critics' reviews are positive, with an average rating of 4.6/10. The website's consensus reads: "Doug's 1st Movie may entertain very young fans of its main character, but essentially amounts to a forgettable feature-length episode of his show."

Critics were harsh to Doug's 1st Movie when it was released theatrically. Many noted that the film felt too much like an extended episode of the show (story- and animation-wise), and many said the film should have stayed a direct-to-video release. Most of the criticism came from the plot, writing, and music, though they praised the animation, voice acting, and ending. Screenit.com awarded the film 4 out of 10, calling it mediocre and saying it did not have "that magic or cinematic feel to warrant the big screen treatment," and it felt like the regular series.

Roger Ebert of the Chicago Sun-Times gave the film one-and-a-half stars out of four, quoting, "Doug's 1st Movie is a thin and less than thrilling feature-length version of a Saturday morning animated series, unseen by me. Chatter on the Web suggests it was originally intended to go straight to video, but was rechanneled into theaters after the startling success of The Rugrats Movie. Since Doug originally started on Nickelodeon, where Rugrats resides, the decision made sense – or would have if this had been a better movie."

=== Box office ===
Doug's 1st Movie opened at #5 in its opening weekend with $4,470,489, for an average of $1,971 from 2,268 theaters. The film grossed $19,421,271 in ticket sales.

=== Awards and nominations ===
The film was nominated for a Best Award or Best Achievement in Animation, but tied to Pokémon: The First Movie.

== Home media ==
The film was released on VHS on September 21, 1999, and on DVD as a Disney Movie Club exclusive on July 20, 2012. The VHS featured, after the movie, a "Never-Before-Seen Dougumentary" that featured the creators of the show offering trivia facts and answering questions from fans, also featured is voice actor Fred Newman who demonstrates his ability to make sound effects while doing the voice of Skeeter Valentine. The DVD used a TV edit, with fade-ins and fade-outs to make way for commercial breaks, as well as sped-up closing credits. As of 2024, the film has still not officially been released on Blu-ray.

The film, along with Disney's Doug, was released on Disney+ on November 12, 2019, its first day of release. This used a new transfer of the film sourced from the master print, as the end credits are shown at their intended speed.
