= Stanley (2001 TV series) =

2001 children's animated TV series

- Genre: Children's television series; Educational
- Based on: Strange Relations by Andrew Griffin
- Developed by: Jim Jinkins; David Campbell
- Directed by: Jeff Buckland
- Voices of: Jessica D. Stone; Charles Shaughnessy; David Landsberg; Ari Meyers; Rene Mujica; Shawn Pyfrom; Hynden Walch; Philece Sampler; Khylan Jones; Candi Milo; Wallace Shawn
- Theme music composer: Peter Lurye
- Opening theme: "My Man Stanley" by Baha Men
- Ending theme: "My Man Stanley" (instrumental)
- Composer: Stuart Kollmorgen
- Country of origin: United States
- Original language: English
- No. of seasons: 3
- No. of episodes: 65

Production
- Running time: 30 minutes
- Production company: Cartoon Pizza

Original release
- Network: Playhouse Disney
- Release: September 15, 2001 – November 26, 2004

Stanley is an American animated children's television series that aired on Playhouse Disney based on the Strange Relations series of children's books created by "Griff" (as indicated on the cover of the original book), also known as Andrew Griffin. It was produced by Cartoon Pizza and was developed for television by Jim Jinkins (the creator of Doug, PB&J Otter, Allegra's Window, JoJo's Circus, and Pinky Dinky Doo) and David Campbell.

The series follows Stanley, voiced by Jessica D. Stone, and teaches a wide variety of issues young children face, including change, growth, rules, and dealing with others. Each episode centers on an animal that deals with or helps explain the issue Stanley is grappling with.

Bahamian Junkanoo and reggae fusion group Baha Men, who are best known for their hit song "Who Let the Dogs Out", sang the series' main theme song, "My Man Stanley".

The series was nominated for Outstanding Achievement in an Animated Television Production Produced for Children by the Annie Awards in 2003.

== Synopsis ==
Each episode shows Stanley (voiced by Jessica D. Stone) in a situation he does not fully understand. He discusses it with his pet goldfish Dennis (voiced by Charles Shaughnessy) before consulting either his computer or the Great Big Book of Everything, a remarkably complete zoology book aimed at young children. By observing how an animal copes with the same situation Stanley faces, or how it can overcome a similar difficulty, Stanley learns to deal with the situation himself.

Throughout the show Stanley and all his friends are able to talk to his pet cat, Elsie (voiced by Hynden Walch) and dog Harry (voiced by Rene Mujica) as well as Dennis. Other animals also seem to occasionally respond, but never talk or give a definite indication they truly understood what was said. Stanley and his friends actively try to keep the adults (that is, except Stanley's grandmother), and by extension Stanley's older brother Lionel, from realizing this.

The Great Big Book of Everything is magical in nature, able to either let the animals out of the pages or allow the children to enter, sometimes changing them into animals in the process. This does not appear to be imaginary since occasionally adults do notice the noise, and Stanley works hard to hide the animals. There is also an episode where Stanley's brother sees a whale on the roof but dismisses the memory when it disappears back into the book.

The Halloween special features Stanley's grandmother who, it is implied, is a witch. She reveals that she too can work the book, and in fact was the one who gave it to Stanley for a fourth birthday present. She was also the one who taught its theme song to Harry and Elsie.

When someone says the "Great Big Book of Everything", hints it out, or even has the book, Elsie and Harry will wake up or find their way into the scene and start singing. This usually annoys Dennis, who after the introductory verse, says something like "Oh, not again!"

== Characters ==
- Stanley Griff (voiced by Jessica D. Stone) is an imaginative 6-year-old boy. Stanley has three pets: a goldfish named Dennis, a dog named Harry, and a cat named Elsie. Stanley has an older brother named Lionel, who enjoys playing his electric guitar, a father who stays at home and draws cartoons, and a mother who is a dentist (the latter two were revealed in the episode "Double-Duty Dad").
- Dennis (voiced by Charles Shaughnessy) is an Estuary English-accented goldfish and one of Stanley's pets. In fact, Dennis is Stanley's best friend who gives him education about animals to help him with his everyday problems, which interest him. Dennis also has to point out the flaws in Stanley's ridiculous solutions. Dennis often breaks the fourth wall by either encouraging the audience to do something fun or by asking them questions.
- Lionel Griff (voiced by Shawn Pyfrom) is the 11-year-old older brother of Stanley. Lionel likes rock and roll music a lot and always wears headphones on his ears, but still loves his younger brother very much by giving him advice, helping out with his homework, and looking out for him.
- Mark Griff (voiced by David Landsberg) is the father of Stanley and Lionel. Mark is a stay-at-home father and works as a cartoonist.
- Dr. Joyce Griff (voiced by Ari Meyers) is the sweet and caring mother of Stanley and Lionel. Joyce works as a dentist and loves her family very much. However, Joyce does have ophidiophobia, which is the fear of snakes.
- Harry (voiced by Rene Mujica) and Elsie (voiced by Hynden Walch) are Stanley's pets. Harry is a male brown dog who loves eating and napping and Elsie is a female yellow cat who also loves napping and often purrs before she says something. They both sing a song about the Great Big Book of Everything, which greatly annoys Dennis.
- Lester Goldberg (voiced by Philece Sampler) is one of Stanley's friends. Lester has a father who is referred to as Mr. Goldberg (voiced by Wallace Shawn) and a mother who is referred to as Mrs. Goldberg (voiced by Didi Conn). In "Little Dog Lost", it is revealed that he is Jewish. Lester also has a little sister named Samantha who went to Mrs. Griff for a dental checkup.
- Marci and Mimi (both voiced by Khylan Jones) are African-American identical twin sisters who are very good friends with Stanley. Marci wears her hair in a bun and loves sports while Mimi wears hers down in braids with a purple bow on her head and loves flowers. They also wear opposite-colored clothes with a baseball on Marci's overalls and a pink flower on Mimi's. In "Little Dog Lost", it's revealed that they celebrate Kwanzaa.
- Jane (voiced by Macy H. Morikawa) is a Chinese-American girl that is in Stanley's class. Jane appears in several episodes. Jane invites Stanley to her house in "Guess Who's Coming to Dinner".

== Episodes ==
=== Season 1 (2001–02) ===
No. overall	No. in season	Title	Directed by	Written by	Animal topic
1	1	"Up the Apple Tree"	Jeff Buckland	Jeff Buckland	Giraffe
1	1	"Kangaroo Clean-Up"	Jeff Buckland	Jeff Kindley	Kangaroo
2	2	"Daddy Pride"	Jeff Buckland	Eric Weiner	Lion
2	2	"Show-and-Tell Shark"	Jeff Buckland	Jeff Kindley	Great white shark
3	3	"Bearly Awake"	Jeff Buckland	Jeff Buckland	Grizzly bear
3	3	"The Eagle Has Landed"	Jeff Buckland	Eric Weiner	Bald eagle
4	4	"Watch Out for Lionels"	Jeff Buckland	Jeff Buckland	Armadillo
4	4	"Growing Pains"	Jeff Buckland	Dennis Garvey & Tommy Nichols	Crab
5	5	"Frog Legs"	Jeff Buckland	Eric Weiner	Frog
5	5	"Whoo's Afraid of the Dark?"	Jeff Buckland	Eric Weiner	Owl
6	6	"Tiger Hunt"	Jeff Buckland	Jeff Buckland	Tiger
6	6	"Monkey-Bar Business"	Jeff Buckland	Dennis Garvey & Tommy Nichols	Chimpanzee
7	7	"Camel Commotion"	Jeff Buckland	Jeff Buckland	Camel
7	7	"There's Snow Place Like Home"	Jeff Buckland	Jeff Buckland	Polar bear
8	8	"A Whale of a Song"	Jeff Buckland	Jim Rubin	Humpback whale
8	8	"Sloth for a Day"	Jeff Buckland	Jim Rubin	Sloth
9	9	"Busy Busy Octopus"	Jeff Buckland	Reed Shelly	Octopus
9	9	"Honest Ostrich"	Jeff Buckland	Reed Shelly	Ostrich
10	10	"Dolphin Talk"	Jeff Buckland	Dennis Garvey & Tommy Nichols	Bottlenose dolphin
10	10	"Whole Lotta Snakin' Goin' On"	Jeff Buckland	Dennis Garvey & Tommy Nichols	Reticulated python
11	11	"Platypus Problems"	Jeff Buckland	Jeff Buckland	Platypus
11	11	"Rabbit Habit"	Jeff Buckland	Jeff Buckland	Rabbit
12	12	"Savanna-Speeders!"	Jeff Buckland	Robert David	Cheetah
12	12	"Tyrannosaurus Wrecks"	Jeff Buckland	Robert David	Tyrannosaurus
13	13	"Hippo Helpers"	Jeff Buckland	Jeff Buckland	Hippopotamus
13	13	"Where's Stanley?"	Jeff Buckland	Jeff Buckland	Camouflage
14	14	"Penguin Party"	Jeff Buckland	Peggy Sarlin	Penguin
14	14	"Leave it to Beavers"	Jeff Buckland	P. Kevin Strader	Beaver
15	15	"The Joker"	Jeff Buckland	Jim Rubin	Kookaburra
15	15	"Baby Pictures"	Jeff Buckland	Reed Shelly	Cat/goldfish/dog
16	16	"You've Got Pigeon Mail"	Jeff Buckland	Reed Shelly	Pigeon
16	16	"It's a Prairie Dog's Life"	Jeff Buckland	Jim Rubin	Prairie dog
17	17	"Remembering with Elephants"	Jeff Buckland	Petersen Harris	African Elephant
17	17	"Garbage Can Bandit"	Jeff Buckland	Petersen Harris	Raccoon
18	18	"Little Dog Lost"	Jeff Buckland	Jeff Buckland	Dog breeds
19	19	"Snow Monkey See, Snow Monkey Do"	Jeff Buckland	Pammy Salmon	Snow monkey
19	19	"Sick Day Stanley"	Jeff Buckland	Jill Cozza	Impala
20	20	"The Big Spill"	Jeff Buckland	Jeff Kindley	Giant anteater
20	20	"Peekaboo Parrot"	Jeff Buckland	Jeff Kindley	Parrot
21	21	"Gorilla Sleepover"	Jeff Buckland	Robert David	Mountain gorilla
21	21	"Sea Lion Slip-Up"	Jeff Buckland	Robert David	Sea lion
22	22	"Worms at Work"	Jeff Buckland	Petersen Harris	Earthworm
22	22	"Caterpillar Countdown"	Jeff Buckland	Jim Rubin	Monarch butterfly, caterpillar
23	23	"In a While, Crocodile"	Jeff Buckland	Eric Weiner	Crocodile
23	23	"The Color of Stanley"	Jeff Buckland	P. Kevin Strader	Chameleon
24	24	"Searching for Spring"	Jeff Buckland	Jeff Kindley	Groundhog
24	24	"Save the Bluebird!"	Jeff Buckland	Jeff Kindley	Eastern bluebird
25	25	"The Pond Couple"	Jeff Buckland	Robert David	Musk turtle
25	25	"Who's Afraid of Walter Wolf?"	Jeff Buckland	Robert David	Gray Wolf
26	26	"A Little Squirrel Music"	Jeff Buckland	Jeff Buckland	Squirrel
26	26	"A Boy's Best Friend Is His Fish"	Jeff Buckland	Jeff Buckland	Goldfish

=== Season 2 (2002–03) ===
No. overall	No. in season	Title	Directed by	Written by	Animal topic
27	1	"Ant Picnic"	Jeff Buckland	Robert David	Ant
27	1	"The Tooth About Teeth"	Jeff Buckland	Robert David	Walrus
28	2	"Eel-lectricity"	Jeff Buckland	Jill Cozza	Electric eel
28	2	"Roller Rhino"	Jeff Buckland	Michele Cavin	Rhinoceros
29	3	"Keep 'Em Flying"	Jeff Buckland	Jeff Buckland	Flying fish
29	3	"Guess What's Coming to Dinner"	Jeff Buckland	Jeff Buckland	Giant panda
30	4	"The Really Real Dragon"	Jeff Buckland	Jeff Kindley	Dragon/Komodo dragon
30	4	"A Billy Goat for Dad"	Jeff Buckland	Jeff Kindley	Goat
31	5	"Bloodhound Blues"	Jeff Buckland	Robert David	Bloodhound
31	5	"Clock-a-Doodle Doo!"	Jeff Buckland	Robert David	Chicken
32	6	"Mistaken Mermaid"	Jeff Buckland	Ronnie Krauss	Manatee
32	6	"It Pays to Be a Pelican"	Jeff Buckland	Robert David	Brown pelican
33	7	"Woodpecker Woes"	Jeff Buckland	Robert David	Woodpecker
33	7	"P.U. Pup"	Jeff Buckland	Susan Kim	Skunk
34	8	"Grandma Griff's Mystery Guest"	Jeff Buckland	Jeff Kindley	Bat
35	9	"Mockingbird Scat"	Jeff Buckland	Eric Weiner	Mockingbird
35	9	"Horsepower"	Jeff Buckland	Eric Weiner	Horse
36	10	"Proud as a Peacock"	Jeff Buckland	Ronnie Krauss	Peacock
36	10	"Dances with Flamingos"	Jeff Buckland	Susan Kim	Flamingo
37	11	"Sunburn Stanley"	Jeff Buckland	Jill Cozza	American lobster
37	11	"Time for Toolfish"	Jeff Buckland	Michele Cavin	Hammerhead shark/Sawfish
38	12	"Web Weavers"	Jeff Buckland	Susan Kim	Spider
38	12	"Muddy Buddies"	Jeff Buckland	Susan Kim	Pig
39	13	"The Robbing Raven"	Jeff Buckland	Robert David	Raven
39	13	"Flashlight Fireflies"	Jeff Buckland	Robert David	Firefly
40	14	"Mysterious Moe"	Jeff Buckland	Jeff Buckland & Michele Cavin	Bornean orangutan
40	14	"Spelling Bee Situation"	Jeff Buckland	Tina Moglia	Honeybee
41	15	"Follow the Lemur"	Jeff Buckland	Ronnie Krauss	Ring-tailed lemur
41	15	"Zebra Jigsaw"	Jeff Buckland	Susan Kim	Zebra
42	16	"Hummingbird Humdinger"	Jeff Buckland	Carin Greenburg Baker	Hummingbird
42	16	"Koala Cuddle"	Jeff Buckland	Carin Greenburg Baker	Koala
43	17	"Double-Duty Dad"	Jeff Buckland	Jeff Kindley	Seahorse
43	17	"Look Who's Helping"	Jeff Buckland	Jeff Kindley	Capuchin monkey
44	18	"Tasmanian Tantrum"	Jeff Buckland	Jill Cozza	Tasmanian devil
44	18	"Sea Otter Safety"	Jeff Buckland	Michele Cavin	Sea otter
45	19	"Going-Away Goose"	Jeff Buckland	Petersen Harris	Canada goose
45	19	"Time to Climb!"	Jeff Buckland	Susan Kim	Yak
46	20	"Stanley's Super Spectacles"	Jeff Buckland	Robert David	Dragonfly
46	20	"The Ugly Griffling"	Jeff Buckland	Robert David	Swan
47	21	"Doing Like Ducks"	Jeff Buckland	Susan Kim	Duck
47	21	"Speedy Does It"	Jeff Buckland	Pammy Salmon	Roadrunner
48	22	"X-Ray X-tra!"	Jeff Buckland	Ronnie Krauss	X-ray fish
48	22	"Under the Umbrella Bird"	Jeff Buckland	Susan Kim	Umbrella bird
49	23	"I Scream for Ice Cream"	Jeff Buckland	Robert David	Cow
49	23	"Snack Savers"	Jeff Buckland	Susan Kim	Vole
50	24	"A Little Nightingale Music"	Jeff Buckland	Carin Greenberg Baker	Nightingale
50	24	"Super Squirrel"	Jeff Buckland	Susan Kim	Flying squirrel
51	25	"Outfoxing Lionel"	Jeff Buckland	Jill Cozza	Red fox
51	25	"Jackrabbit Hide-and-Seek"	Jeff Buckland	Susan Kim	Black-tailed jackrabbit
52	26	"Me and My Palfish"	Jeff Buckland	Carin Greenburg Baker	Clownfish
52	26	"At the Zoo!"	Jeff Buckland	Robert David	Mandrill

=== Season 3 (2004) ===
No. overall	No. in season	Title	Directed by	Written by	Animal topic
53	1	"Stanley's Dinosaur Round-Up"	Jeff Buckland	Sherri Stoner	Brachiosaurus
54	2	"Stanley's Dinosaur Round-Up"	Jeff Buckland	Sherri Stoner	Brachiosaurus
55	3	"Stanley's Dinosaur Round-Up"	Jeff Buckland	Sherri Stoner	Brachiosaurus
56	4	"To Catch a Hamster"	Jeff Buckland	Jill Cozza	Hamster
56	4	"Pearls of Wisdom"	Jeff Buckland	Claudia Silver	Oyster
57	5	"Living with Leopards"	Jeff Buckland	Robert David	Leopard/Snow leopard
57	5	"A Chinese New Year"	Jeff Buckland	Pippin Parker	Chinese zodiac
58	6	"A Turkey of a Thanksgiving"	Jeff Buckland	Andy Yerkes	Domestic turkey
59	7	"The Way of the Buffalo"	Jeff Buckland	James Ponti	Bison
59	7	"Follow That Falcon"	Jeff Buckland	Tina Moglia	Peregrine falcon
60	8	"Shell Game"	Jeff Buckland	Jill Cozza	Painted turtle
60	8	"Sheep and a Haircut"	Jeff Buckland	Michele Cavin	Sheep
61	9	"No News Like Shoe News"	Jeff Buckland	Michele Cavin	Snowshoe hare
61	9	"Ladybug, Ladybug"	Jeff Buckland	Pippin Parker	Ladybug
62	10	"Curse of the Angry Coral"	Jeff Buckland	Andy Yerkes	Coral
62	10	"A Little Bird Told Me"	Jeff Buckland	Andy Yerkes	Cedar waxwing
63	11	"Stanley's Great Big Book of Adventure"	Jeff Buckland	Joey Mazzarino	Kokako bird
64	12	"Stanley's Great Big Book of Adventure"	Jeff Buckland	Joey Mazzarino	Walrus
65	13	"Stanley's Great Big Book of Adventure"	Jeff Buckland	Joey Mazzarino	Snowy owl Jackrabbit Snake Elephant Camel Penguin Rhinoceros Puma Tyrannosaurus

=== Specials ===
1. "Little Dog Lost" (Christmas)
2. "Grandma Griff's Mystery Guest" (Halloween)
3. "Stanley's Dinosaur Round-Up"
4. "A Turkey of a Thanksgiving" (Thanksgiving)
5. "Stanley's Great Big Book of Adventure"

== Broadcast history ==
In the US, the series debuted on Playhouse Disney on September 15, 2001. When Playhouse Disney rebranded its on-air presentation in 2007, Stanley was put on a new time slot at 6:00 AM ET on weekends. Stanley stopped airing in May 2008, but the show was still available on PlayhouseDisney.com. In February 2011, the show was completely removed when Playhouse Disney rebranded as Disney Junior. The show was briefly seen online on DisneyJunior.com as part of "fan favorites" week on the week of June 20, 2011. From March 23, 2012, to September 2, 2013, the series returned on the U.S. airwaves on Disney Junior. Stanley was available on demand from that point until 2019, when it was removed. The show has yet to be added to Disney+; although, in 2021, reruns aired on the weekends on Disney Junior in Japan.

In Canada, it ran on The Family Channel from 2002 to 2007 and then was moved to Disney Junior, which ran from November 30, 2007, until September 29, 2013, when it was removed from the schedule. It also aired on the Canadian-French version of Disney Junior since 2010.

=== Canada ===
- Family (Canada) (2001 - November 29, 2007)
- Disney Junior (English Canada) (November 30, 2007 – September 27, 2013)
- Disney Junior (French Canada) (May 6, 2011 - 2013)
- Playhouse Disney (English Canada) (November 30, 2007 - September 27, 2013)
- Playhouse Disney (French Canada) (July 5, 2010 - May 5, 2011)

=== United States ===
- Disney Channel (Playhouse Disney) (September 15, 2001 - 2008)
- Disney Junior (March 23, 2012 - 2013)

=== Japan ===
- Disney Channel (Disney Junior) (2012–present)

== Awards and nominations ==
Year	Award	Category	Recipient	Result	Ref.
2002	Emmy Award	Outstanding Performer in an Animated Program	Charles Shaughnessy for playing "Dennis"	Won	
2003	Annie Awards	Outstanding Achievement in an Animated Television Production Produced for Children	Disney / Cartoon Pizza	Won	

== Film ==
On June 23, 2005, Walt Disney Home Entertainment released a full-length direct-to-video movie based on Stanley, entitled Stanley's Dinosaur Round-Up. The film centers on the titular character as he, along with Elsie, Dennis, Harry, Marci, Mimi and Lester team up to save his Great Uncle Stew (John Ritter, who completed his work for the film before he died)'s dude ranch from the greedy Rockin' Rory (Randy Quaid) who intends to buy the ranch and turn it into an amusement park.

== Bibliography ==
- Erickson, Hal (2005). Television Cartoon Shows: An Illustrated Encyclopedia, 1949 Through 2003 (2nd ed.). McFarland & Co. ISBN 978-1476665993.
- Perlmutter, David (2018). The Encyclopedia of American Animated Television Shows. Rowman & Littlefield. ISBN 978-1538103739.
