= JoJo's Circus =

Children's stop-motion animated musical series from 2003-2007

- Genre: Musical; Comedy; Educational
- Created by: Jim Jinkins; David Campbell; Lisa Jinkins; Eric Weiner
- Written by: Douglas Wood
- Directed by: John Schnall; Tim Snyder
- Voices of: Madeleine Martin; Robert Smith; Alan Ford; Austin Di Iulio; Keeler Sandhaus; Diana Peressini; Tajja Isen; Jayne Eastwood
- Theme music composer: Jim Latham (music); Judy Rothman (lyrics)
- Opening theme: "JoJo's Circus" performed by BECKY
- Ending theme: "JoJo's Circus" (instrumental)
- Composers: Score: Stuart Kollmorgen; Original Songs: Jeffrey Zahn (music); Jim Latham (music); Judy Rothman (lyrics)
- Countries of origin: United States; Canada
- Original language: English
- No. of seasons: 3
- No. of episodes: 59

Production
- Executive producers: Jim Jinkins; David Campbell; Adam Shaheen
- Producers: Jeff Kindley; John P. Catapano; Morghan Fortier; Jack Spillum; Melanie Grisanti
- Running time: 20 minutes
- Production companies: Cartoon Pizza; Cuppa Coffee Studios

Original release
- Network: Disney Channel
- Release: September 28, 2003 – February 14, 2007

JoJo's Circus is a stop-motion animated children's television series created by Jim Jinkins, David Campbell, Lisa Jinkins, and Eric Weiner and produced by Cuppa Coffee Studios and Cartoon Pizza. The series was written by Douglas Wood, who was previously a creative executive on two Warner Bros. Animation series, Tiny Toon Adventures and Animaniacs. The series' songs were composed by Jeffrey Zahn and Jim Latham, with lyrics done by Judy Rothman. The theme song was performed by BECKY.

The series ran on Disney Channel as part of the Playhouse Disney block from September 28, 2003 to February 14, 2007 with reruns until 2008.

== Overview ==
The series that takes place in a fantasy Circus Town, a self-sufficient city whose intellectual center is the "Big Top" tent. The story centers on JoJo Tickle, an active 6-year-old clown girl, and Goliath, JoJo's pet lion. She and Goliath learned at the Little Big Top Circus School, where all young soon-to-be circus performers learn under their teacher Mrs. Kersplatski. Along with her friends, JoJo discovers and learns while dealing with challenging situations.

=== Format ===
JoJo's Circus depends on repetition in its structure. Each segment always begins with JoJo searching for Goliath, who is always hiding. JoJo then is introduced with the situation that will occupy the theme of the show. A song, usually about the resolution of the situation, is then performed by JoJo.

At the conclusion of each episode, a supporting character asks, "What did you learn today, JoJo?", and before she can reply, JoJo is taken away for the last segment, the "spotlight moment". JoJo is then placed on a makeshift stage with various cameramen, lighting grips, and producers running about, while the "Spotlight Moment" song plays, asking what she's learned, is sung and JoJo taps her foot along (in some episodes she also taps her hand on her leg). Subsequently, JoJo says what she has learned in the course of the episode.

== Characters ==
The show's voice directors are Kent Meridith (United States) and Debra Toffan (Canada).

=== Main ===
- JoJo Tickle (voiced by Madeleine Martin) is a very cheerful 6-year-old clown girl whose parents are famous circus clowns and the hostess of the show. She's very kindhearted, has a great sense of humor and boundless curiosity; she loves to clown around. Quite often, she talks to the audience. JoJo attends Clown School with various friends, including her best friend Skeebo Seltzer. They are taught by Mrs. Kersplatski.
- Goliath (voiced by Robert Norman Smith and Alan Ford) is JoJo's 4-year-old pet lion who attends school just like JoJo and the show's co-host. He's also part of the Tickle family. Because of his great playfulness, he hides a lot from JoJo in the beginning of each episode. He is JoJo's best friend.
- Skeebo Seltzer/Funnyshoes (voiced by Austin Di Iulio in Season 1 and Keeler Sandhaus in Seasons 2 & 3) is a purple-colored, class cowboy clown who is also JoJo's closest best friend, just like Goliath, and attends school with her and the other circus kids. Skeebo's very eager to make people laugh a lot by making new jokes, gags and tricks that sometimes fall flat. Since "Skeebo's Pet", he has a pet dog named Harpo.
- Croaky Frogini (voiced by Diana Peressini) is the great leaper of the group. She met JoJo on the first day of school when she realized she had different abilities and agreed to help each other learn different tricks.
- Peaches Tickle (voiced by Marnie McPhail in Seasons 1 & 2 and Shannon Perreault in Season 3) is JoJo's mother, Mr. Tickle's wife, Lotta Yucks' granddaughter, Granny and Grampy's daughter and Uncle Flippy's sister. She is a very tall, skinny clown who is full of lots of sunshine and often makes goodies for her family and Circus Town residents. She is a klutzy ilk, but a very good juggler and sometimes catches 15 objects in the air when she accidentally trips.
- Mrs. Karen Kersplatski (voiced by Jayne Eastwood) is JoJo's teacher and the ringmistress of the Big Top. A warm and encouraging teacher with glasses, Mrs. Kersplatski gives the circus kids a strong sense of mastery and confidence, with her combination of hard work and play. Often she has a tendency to be rather clumsy and often says, "I'm okay!" after tripping up. In the special "A Circus Town Wedding", she marries Mr. Muscles and becomes Maya's stepmother.

=== Supporting ===
- Trina Tightrope (voiced by Tajja Isen) is a ballet dancing tightrope walker and a fellow classmate of the Circus Clown School. She comes across as abrupt and snobbish on some reason, but apologizes for her mistakes when she becomes aware of them. She has a pet cat named Caterina.
- Mr. Tickle (voiced by David Sparrow in Season 1 and Noah Weisberg in Seasons 2 & 3) is JoJo's father, Peaches' husband, Lotta Yucks' grandson-in-law, Granny and Grampy's son-in-law and Uncle Flippy's brother-in-law. He is a very jolly clown who often blasts off in a cannon and whose first name is never mentioned.
- Dinky Pachyderm (voiced by Julie Lemieux) is a very sweet and frisky young baby elephant and a fellow classmate of JoJo. While Dinky may be a bit clumsy and somewhat oafish, when he dances, he turns into "Mr. Graceful". Hide and seek is his personal favorite game.
- Tater Spudinski (voiced by Cole Caplan) is one of the two children in the Spudinski group. His sleepy potato sort-of seems to be the antithesis to the "get up and go" feel of the show, but sometimes he just can't help but join in the fun. In the second season, he has a younger sister named Small Fry.
- Bal Boa (voiced by Julie Lemieux) is a sneaky contortionist snake with a talent for making number and letter shapes. Bal Boa also has a knack for troublemaking. He thinks it's fun to coax JoJo and others into doing what they are not supposed to do, and the children are sometimes susceptible to Bal Boa's charms. Bal Boa is also an expert on harvesting squirting flowers by doing a trance dance.

=== Other ===
- Fellini (voiced by Neil Crone) and Federico Frogini (voiced by John Stocker) are the two Italian-accented brothers are expert jumpers and trapeze artists. Fellini and Federico are uncle and father, respectively, to Croaky. They are also called the Flying Froginis.
- Dr. Seltzer/Funnyshoes (voiced by Kathy Greenwood) is Skeebo's mother. She is Circus Town's only doctor and Fire Chief Seltzer's wife. Though she's not in many episodes and only makes cameos in some episodes, her most notable appearances are in the episodes, "A Serious Case of the Sillies", and "Tickled Pink".
- Fire Chief Seltzer/Chief Funnyshoes, also known as Seltzy, (voiced by Patrick McKenna), is Skeebo's father. He is the chief of the local fire department in Circus Town and Dr. Seltzer's husband. He is also the director of the Circus Town Clown Band.
- Mr. (voiced by Bruce Bayley Johnson) and Mrs. Spudinski (voiced by Julie Lemieux) are Tater's parents, who have the same sleepy nature as he does. It's revealed in "The Thanksgiving Hip-Hooray Parade" episode that Tater calls his father "Daddy Spud", and in "Circus Town Makeover" Mrs. Spudinski's name is revealed as Ida and Mr. Spudinski's name is revealed as Russ.
- Small Fry Spudinski (voiced by Julie Lemieux) is Tater's baby sister and one of the two children in the Spudinski clan.
- Mr. Aldeberto Muscles (voiced by Mark Consuelos in Season 1 and Erik Estrada in Seasons 2 & 3) is the circus strongman and a physical education instructor. He knows a lot of different exercises that he teaches to those in Circus Town. He has a daughter named Maya and recently married Mrs. Kersplatski, but it's unknown whether he was divorced or widowed by Maya's mother. He is in dual language and also speaks in both English and Spanish.
- Maya Muscles (voiced by Phoebe McAuley) is the daughter of Mr. Muscles and stepdaughter of Mrs. Kersplatski. Maya can be rather shy at times, but she loves to get up and go. She is known by her nickname "Little Mouse" by her father and her favorite "happy place" is a daisy patch.
- Mrs. Pachyderm (voiced by Judy Marshak) is Dinky's mother. She has also been referred to as Mrs. Elephant.
- Babalulu (voiced by Kathy Brier) is Circus Town's pretzel vendor and ice cream shop owner. JoJo and her friends sometimes visit her at the ice cream parlor for a treat. JoJo and her friends taught Babalulu how to make pretzel twists in the episode "A New Twist".
- Lotta Yucks is JoJo's great-grandmother, Peaches' grandmother, Mr. Tickle's grandmother-in-law, Granny's mother and Grampy's mother-in-law. She was a famous circus performer doing tightrope and comical pratfall acts.
- Jumberto (voiced by Jonathan Potts) is a jackrabbit magician whose tricks rarely work.
- Jig, Jag, and Jug (all voiced by Sunday Muse) are the three mischievous nephews of Jumberto.
- Terrific (voiced by Ed Saheley) is a famous tiger tamer in Circus Town. He has a tiger named Tippoo.
- Uncle Flippy (voiced by Tony Daniels) is a farmer, JoJo's maternal uncle, Peaches' brother, Mr. Tickle's brother-in-law, Granny and Grampy's son. Uncle Flippy owns a farm on the outskirts of Circus Town. On the episode entitled "Uncle Flippy's Funny Farm", JoJo and her classmates help Uncle Flippy round up all the animals who escaped from the barn. Strangely, he has a pet tiger and two horses named Moe and Costello.
- Super Duper Girl is JoJo's favorite TV superhero clown whose motto is "Morning, Noon or Night I Always Do What's Right!" while fighting "Big Meanies" who "Pick on" others.
- Baloney Balloony (voiced by Darren Frost) is known for making balloon animals. Baloney Balloony can make any animal-shaped balloons with his hands. He has a grandson named Bailey.
- Cotton Andy (voiced by Paul Soles) is a cotton candy vendor who own a cotton candy machine named "Whoopsabelle" and also officiated as Justice of the Peace for the marriage of Mrs. Kersplatski and Mr. Muscles in the wedding episode "A Circus Town Wedding".
- Bingo Bongo is the world's greatest traveling clown who travels via hot air balloon.
- Charlie the Clown Baby is one of JoJo's cousins who the Tickles sometimes babysit. He is the son of Peaches' sister.
- Grampy Tickle (voiced by Keith Knight), Young Grampy Tully (voiced by Joshua Isen) and Granny Tickle (voiced by Kate Gallant) are JoJo's maternal grandparents, Peaches' parents, Mr. Tickle's parents-in-law, Lotta Yucks' son-in-law and daughter. Tully and Sadie Tickle were experts on clowning way before JoJo was born. Their famous act is the "Silly Shoe Shuffle", in which Granny Tickle passed the act to both JoJo and Goliath.
- Terra Cotta (voiced by Kristen Bone) is a young clown girl who wears an oversize flowerpot for a hat, and she bought JoJo's silly skates in the "Too Many Toys" episode.
- Mrs. Cotta is Terra Cotta's mom who wears a planter for a hat.
- Mr. Postman is an octopus/polyp who is the Mail Carrier for Circus Town.
- Mrs. Boa is Bal Boa's mother.
- Hogan the Hamster is one of the class pets who live at the Little Big Top Clown School.
- Cha Cha the Clown Crab is one of the class pets from the Little Big Top Clown School who JoJo takes care of for the night.
- The Fire Clowns are the firefighting crew at the Circus Town firehouse under the command of Fire Chief Seltzer who carry JoJo off at the end of each episode and help build the makeshift stage for JoJo's "spotlight moment". They're also the resident orchestra for Circus Town's Big Top.
- King Regis (voiced by Aiden Turner) and Queen Regina (voiced by Mariska Hargitay) JoJo's Royal Uncle and brother of Mr. Tickle and Aunt from Really Royal Land who are the Parents of Princess Josephina.
- Princess Josephina (voiced by Tajja Isen) is JoJo's similar-looking royal cousin who lives in Really Royal Land. She has a pet lion named Hercules who looks just like Goliath. She and JoJo decide that it would be fun to trade places.
- Jibby Jabby-Jamboree, also known as Jibbs, is the butler who serves the Royal Family of Really Royal Land.
- Miss Blathers is Princess Josephina's personal tutor on etiquette.
- Bailey Balloon (voiced by Matthew Josten) is Baloney Ballooney's grandson. Bailey Ballooney normally attends Small Top Hills School and only visited JoJo's class on Valentine's Day. JoJo comes up with a special way to make him a valentine in the episode "My Clowny Valentine".
- Mr. Jing-a-Ling is the telephone at Fire Chief Seltzer's firehouse where Fire Chief Selzer receives their emergency calls.
- Waldo is a sea lion who suffered from memory loss who JoJo helps to remember a musical piece before a major performance.
- Ivan is a famous circus bear from Circusylvania who only speaks Circusylvanian.
- Franco the Fantastic is a lion who is known as "The King of the Jungle" and "The Greatest Circus Lion of All Times".
- Alex is Skeebo's cousin who is deaf and only speaks in sign language.
- Mr. and Mrs. Tightrope are Trina's parents who are slightly uppity and snooty, but very loving and kind.
- T.J. Freckles/ T.J. Hiccups is Skeebo's Ventriloquist puppet in which Skeebo uses in his act.
- Dr. Longtall is the veterinarian who takes care of Goliath and the other sick animals at Circus Town.
- Miss Spritzy is the hairstylist who works at the Circus Town Hair Salon.
- Chico the Mouse is the ringmaster of the Mouse Circus.
- Grasshopper the Magnificent is the tightrope walker of the Mouse Circus.
- Sasharoo is the wild animal trainer in the Mouse Circus who trains with a chipmunk.
- Professor Tick Tock is the watcher of the cuckoos of the Cuckoo Forest and provider of the cuckoo clocks for Circus Town.
- The Cricketeers (Hector, Gracie, and Cody) are a musical group formed of a family of crickets who comes to perform at Circus Town. Hector is the leader and his wife is Gracie and his son is Cody. Goliath has a crush with Gracie.
- Nosey Josie is the reporter for the Circus Town News Network who has a nose for news.
- Jumping Jack is the host of Circus Town Makeover and exercise/fitness guru.
- The citizens of Sky Top are the villagers who live in the village of Sky Top who at once thought that Normus the Giant was a mean giant who once destroyed their village, but discovered that Normus was actually very friendly.
- Normus (voiced by Al Roker) is a very friendly giant who lives on top of the beanstalk who due to a misunderstanding by the townsfolk of the beanstalk village of Sky Top thought he was a mean giant who almost destroyed the town and had a slight fear of clowns.
- Cozy is Normus' pet chipmunk.

== Development and concept ==
The show emphasizes simple, everyday lessons such as playing with others, detecting the sequence, personal hygiene, responsibility, and safety. Also, foremost is the show's emphasis on exercise: JoJo often asks for audience participation (such as clapping, jumping, and stretching) for the viewers. The series is animated in claymation, which is a serious departure to Jinkins' past 2D-animated works.

Two characters JoJo and her pet lion, Goliath, returned in a yoga-style interstitial called Feeling Good with JoJo.

== Episodes ==
=== Series overview ===
Season	Episodes	Originally released	
Season	Episodes	First released	Last released
1	25	September 28, 2003	March 30, 2004
2	28	October 17, 2004	March 20, 2006
3	6	July 17, 2006	February 14, 2007

=== Season 1 (2003–04) ===
No. overall	No. in season	Title	Directed by	Written by	Original release date
1	1	"Easy as Pie" "Take a Bow"	John Schnall and Tim Snyder	Eric Weiner Suzanne Collins	September 28, 2003
JoJo Tickle has finally attended her first day at the Little Big Top Clown School alongside her pet lion Goliath. At Clown School, they both meet their new teacher, Mrs. Kersplatski, and introduce her to her new classroom. But before she left, she told JoJo not to press the orange clown nose button of a UFO shape robotic machine and left. As curiosity gives in, JoJo pressed the orange clown nose button and hilarity ensures as the strange machine runs amok and starts to throw cream pies all over the room. There's a new kid in class, a frog named Croaky Frogini, and JoJo teaches Croaky, how not to be nervous about the first day of class and how to do their best in class.
2	2	"Uncle Flippy's Funny Farm" "Up, Up and Away!"	John Schnall and Tim Snyder	Susan Kim Jill Cozza	September 29, 2003
JoJo and her friends go on a field trip to the farm, but hilarity ensues, when JoJo accidentally left the barn doors open and the animals are out of their pens running amok. Baloney Balloony, the amazing grandmaster balloon clown, visits JoJo's school and makes balloons for the children that look just like them, but the children must pop the balloons, when Goliath floats to the ceiling with them.
3	3	"Hide and Go Dinky" "Fire Chief Says"	John Schnall and Tim Snyder	Eric Weiner James Ponti	September 30, 2003
Dinky wants to play hide and seek, but JoJo and Skeebo rather play other games that are too hard for Dinky to play. JoJo and Goliath are with their classmates, while waiting at Chief Seltzer's fire station plays Fire Chief Says (a type of game similar to "Simon Says"), but when they receive a call for a cat rescue, JoJo and her classmates helps out by cleaning the fire truck, while playing Fire Chief Says.
4	4	"Confetti Caper" "JoJo on the Tightrope"	John Schnall and Tim Snyder	Susan Kim Frederick Stroppel	October 1, 2003
A box of confetti goes missing and JoJo and her friends must locate the missing confetti before her parents' performance, and discovers that the mice used the confetti to use for their circus posters. JoJo tries to prove that she can be a tightrope walker just like Trina, but finds out that it is more difficult, than she thought.
5	5	"Try These on for Boing!" "Happy Birthday Tater!"	John Schnall and Tim Snyder	Alan Goodman Suzanne Collins	October 2, 2003
JoJo goes to the Clown Shoe Store to purchase a new pair of Clown Shoes, after outgrowing her old shoes. JoJo and her friends try to wake up Tater and his family, in time for Tater's fifth birthday party celebration.
6	6	"Cotton Andy" "Nighty Night"	John Schnall and Tim Snyder	Frederick Stroppel Lisa Jinkins	October 3, 2003
JoJo learns how to make cotton candy from Cotton Andy the Cotton Candy master, but she forgets one of the steps on how to stop the machine and blankets Circus Town with cotton candy. JoJo learns about different bedtime routines from her friends, and must sing to Goliath, when her father is at the Big Top Clown convention and can't sing her to sleep.
7	7	"Skeebo's Missing Hat Trick" "Seal Fright"	John Schnall and Tim Snyder	Robert David Frederick Stroppel	October 4, 2003
Jumberto the Jackrabbit mistakenly made Skeebo's hat disappear, so JoJo and Goliath have to help him find it, before a big performance. JoJo helps Waldo the seal, who is trying to memorize a musical number, but can't remember the song that he's going to perform and teaches him a trick to improve her memory, and not to be nervous when he's scheduled to fill in for an ailing performer.
8	8	"The Legend of Clownfoot"	John Schnall and Tim Snyder	James Ponti	October 5, 2003
On Halloween, JoJo and her friends get spooked out when they hear some scary noises, believing that it's a Bigfoot-like creature, Clownfoot.
9	9	"The Circus Shh Shh" "The Little Big Top Boogie Band"	John Schnall and Tim Snyder	Richard Register and Michael Gans Dan Elish	October 6, 2003
It's Play All Day Day at JoJo's house, but JoJo's father is suffering from a bad case of the Sneaky Sneezies, and has to stay home from work and rest, but JoJo's friends have a hard time trying to keep quiet. JoJo and her friends form a band, but Croaky feels left out because she can't find an instrument to play and her singing is poor, so JoJo tells her that her singing might still be good in the band even though it's bad, and finds a way to include her in the band.
10	10	"Drum Roll Please" "Cannonball JoJo"	John Schnall and Tim Snyder	Suzanne Collins Annie Evans	October 20, 2003
JoJo accidentally breaks a bass drum before a performance, and JoJo, Goliath and Skeebo tries to fix the bass drum, before the Frogini's performance. After seeing photos of her relatives being shot out of cannons, JoJo wonders what it would be like to shoot out from a cannon, but learns that it takes much practice to do it.
11	11	"Flower Shower" "The Itchy-Oochy Scratch Patch"	John Schnall and Tim Snyder	Suzanne Collins Frank Stroppel	October 27, 2003
JoJo must replace her father's squirting flower, after his old one loses its spray, and learns how to pick one, after witnessing Bal Boa's Trance Dance, without getting soaked. JoJo, Goliath, and Skeebo accidentally fall into a patch of Itchy Ootchy Scratch Plants, and they develop an ugly rash.
12	12	"Messy Mess" "Pop Up!"	John Schnall and Tim Snyder	Suzanne Collins Peter Mattei	December 1, 2003
JoJo, her friends, and Mr. Tickle make a large banana split for Mrs. Kersplatski as a "Teacher's Day" surprise, alongside making a big mess in the process. Skeebo develops an outbreak of the polka-dot spots (similar to Measles or Chicken Pox) and has to stay home in bed (for two weeks) to recover, so JoJo decides to keep him company with a jack-in-the-box toy.
13	13	"The Whatchamadoodle" "What's the Trick?"	John Schnall and Tim Snyder	Robert David Annie Evans	December 2, 2003
Bingo Bongo, the world's greatest circus clown who travels around the world via hot air balloon, accidentally drops a tennis racket while searching for her map, and when JoJo and her friends see it, they have no idea what it is and try to figure out what it is. JoJo, after seeing Terrific the Tiger Tamer showing off some tricks with his tiger, Tippoo tries to teach Goliath to do the same, but Goliath was too young to learn to do a type of trick, that has degree of difficulty.
14	14	"Zero Heroes" "The Spudinski's New Act"	John Schnall and Tim Snyder	James Ponti Mary Gallagher	December 3, 2003
JoJo and Goliath attempt to learn some emergency practice skills, from Chief Funnyshoes. Mr. Spudinski shows JoJo and her classmates, some new circus acts.
15	15	"JoJo Signs Up" "The Un-Average Day"	John Schnall and Tim Snyder	Susan Kim Andy Yerkes	December 4, 2003
JoJo and Skeebo, while helping Peaches hang up circus posters for her, accidentally hang the posters backward and use their finger painting skills to create new ones. JoJo spends time with her father for the day, and discovers that she still can have a fun un-average day, than a boring average day.
16	16	"Mirror Mirror" "Trina Trips Up"	John Schnall and Tim Snyder	Jill Cozza Claudia Silver	December 5, 2003
JoJo learns an old family tradition called "Mirroring" from her grandparents, and teams up with Goliath to do the routine for class. Trina learns that everyone makes mistakes sometimes, after she trips during her tightrope act during a talent show at school, and feels embarrassed.
17	17	"The Clown Family Picnic" "Dinky's Dance"	John Schnall and Tim Snyder	Andy Yerkes Claudia Silver	December 6, 2003
JoJo and Skeebo have a short snit before the Clown Family Relay Race to see who would win, but learn that winning isn't everything. Dinky learns to dance for the upcoming dance recital, but worries that his clumsiness will ruin the recital.
18	18	"Hamster-cize!" "Shoo Fly Shoo!"	John Schnall and Tim Snyder	Susan Kim	December 7, 2003
Hogan the hamster escapes from his cage, and JoJo and Tater uses the exercises that they learned in class, to rescue him. A fly interrupts Mr. Tickle's concert, but JoJo helps out by allowing the fly to co-conduct the orchestra with her father. Note: On DirecTV, the title was incorrectly stated the episodes as "Hamster Size" and "Shoo Fly Shoo!".
19	19	"A Circus Town Christmas"	John Schnall and Tim Snyder	Mary Gallagher	December 7, 2003
JoJo and Skeebo learn the real importance of giving.
20	20	"The Lost Roar" "Helping Hands"	John Schnall and Tim Snyder	Annie Evans	March 22, 2004
Goliath loses his voice before a big performance starring him, so JoJo and her friends fill in for him. JoJo and Goliath need to pick gumdrops, so JoJo's mother, Peaches can use them to make a Gumdrop Supremo for the Circus Town Feast, and gets help from everyone in town.
21	21	"Skeebo's Pet" "Follow That Rainbow"	John Schnall and Tim Snyder	Mary Gallagher Susan Kim	March 23, 2004
Skeebo wants a puppy for a pet, but his parents want Skeebo to practice by taking care a toy duck named Quacky-Wacky, before he can get a real pet. JoJo and her friends follow a rainbow to find a special treasure, but they need to get through a series of obstacles to get to the treasure.
22	22	"A Serious Case of the Sillies" "Hide and Go-Liath"	John Schnall and Tim Snyder	Claudia Silver Andy Yerkes	March 24, 2004
While at the big top, JoJo notices rather odd behavior among the circus performers. Everyone seems to be giggling and acting kooky, rather than working on their acts. When JoJo begins laughing like crazy too, it's a good thing that she's just caught up with Dr. Seltzer. It's bath day for Goliath and, as is usual with him, he's hiding everywhere to avoid taking a bath. As he keeps slipping out of JoJo's grasp, it seems that JoJo's attempt to get him clean is just getting her dirty.
23	23	"Funny Bunnies" "Ivan the Bearable"	John Schnall and Tim Snyder	Claudia Silver Andy Yerkes	March 25, 2004
Jumberto Jackrabbit ask JoJo, Goliath, and Skeebo to babysit his nephews Jig, Jag, and Jug, while he goes to town to fix a magic wand that is not working properly, but when the triplets wake up, chaos ensues, and the threesome tries to get them back in the basket, before Jumberto returns. Ivan, a famous circus bear from Circusylvania, arrives in Circus Town, but left his luggage on the train, but since Ivan could only speak Circusylvanian, JoJo and her friends communicate with Ivan, via pantomime.
24	24	"JoJo to the Rescue" "A Clown Ride"	John Schnall and Tim Snyder	Susan Kim Annie Evans	March 26, 2004
JoJo pretends to be a superhero like Super Duper Girl, and she then helps Dinky find his lost toy duck. JoJo visits Uncle Flippy's farm to learn how to ride a horse with her father, but her father rides a horse named Costello, who acts very, very silly rather than riding Moe, who is Uncle Flippy's riding horse.
25	25	"Charlie the Clown Baby" "Fire House Day"	John Schnall and Tim Snyder	Claudia Silver James Ponti	March 30, 2004
JoJo and her parents babysit her youngest cousin Charlie, but it can be very hard for them. JoJo and her friends learn about fire safety during Firehouse Days at the Circus Town Firehouse.

=== Season 2 (2004–06) ===
No. overall	No. in season	Title	Directed by	Written by	Original release date
26	1	"Sleep-Over Surprises" "How Does Your Garden Grow?"	John Schnall and Tim Snyder	Pammy Salmon Jill Cozza	October 17, 2004
JoJo holds her first ever sleepover at her house, but Bal Boa feels a bit homesick and is afraid of showing his stuffed animal (Stuffy Wuff) during the sleep-over, but is surprised that everyone brought theirs to the sleep-over. JoJo learns to plant her own garden by growing squirting flowers and learns that it takes time and patience for them to grow.
27	2	"Fit as a Tickle" "Pedal Pushers"	John Schnall and Tim Snyder	James Ponti Douglas Wood	October 18, 2004
After Mr. Tickle's cannon breaks down and missing the Circus Train, JoJo and Mr. Muscles began an exercise program for him to get him physically fit. After missing the mailman while trying to mail an invitation for Mr. Tickle's surprise party, JoJo starts a bicycle delivery service with Skeebo, Fire Chief Seltzer, and the Fire Clown band.
28	3	"A New Twist" "Lost and Found"	John Schnall and Tim Snyder	Cate Lieuwen Douglas Wood	October 19, 2004
Babalulu the owner of the local ice cream parlor now has a job selling pretzels at the Big Top, but she never know how to twist pretzels, so JoJo and her friends help out doing crazy twisted forms for Babalulu's pretzels. JoJo accidentally leaves an old family heirloom, a large clown nose that once belonged to her maternal Great Grandmother Lotta Yucks (Peaches' Grandmother) at Babalulu's ice cream parlor and must move it back, not knowing that the large red clown nose got mixed up with cherries at the ice cream parlor.
29	4	"The Best Breakfast Ever" "Popcorn Panic!"	John Schnall and Tim Snyder	Susan Kim	October 20, 2004
JoJo and her father try to make a special breakfast for Peaches for Sweet Peaches Day (a holiday like Mother's Day) but it goes wrong. JoJo and her friends make crafts out of a type of popcorn that they thought was old and wouldn't pop but it's a special kind known as "Giggle Corn" that pops whenever they laugh.
30	5	"Frown Fighters" "Goliath the Great!"	John Schnall and Tim Snyder	Jill Cozza Cate Lieuwen	October 21, 2004
While at the park practicing funny clown walks, JoJo and her friends discover a depressed Cotton Andy, after his cotton candy-making machine Whoopsabell breaks down and tries to cheer him up exhibiting the funny clown walks that they learned in class. Franco the Fantastic the King of the Jungle and the greatest circus lion of all time visit the Big Top for performance and Goliath feels a bit jealous and envious about him and thinks that Franco was better than him but learns that being himself is just as good.
31	6	"Hi There, Small Fry!" "My Dinner with the Tightropes"	John Schnall and Tim Snyder	Susan Kim Claudia Silver	January 1, 2005
JoJo and her friends meet Tater's new youngest sister, Small Fry, for the first time but Tater gets jealous when Small Fry gets all the attention but learns that being an older brother is very important. JoJo and her parents are invited to the Tightropes for dinner but have to act fancy and finally learn that the Tightropes would rather have the Tickle family be funny than fancy and learn a few humorous tricks from the Tickles.
32	7	"My Favorite Frogsitters" "Night of the Teddy Bears' Dance"	John Schnall and Tim Snyder	Susan Kim Douglas Wood	January 17, 2005
The Froginis take care of JoJo and Goliath for the night while the Tickles celebrate their wedding anniversary. JoJo and Goliath witness a special dance by the Teddy Bears while camping out with the Clown Scouts at the Funny Face National Park.
33	8	"100 Days and Counting" "Hoop Happy"	John Schnall and Tim Snyder	Douglas Wood Peggy Sarlin	February 6, 2005
Mrs. Kersplatski has a special surprise for her class --- tomorrow is their 100th day of school! She has some big, fancy blocks for 100 and explains some helpful tips to count up that high. She then asks each member of the class to bring in one hundred things the next day. JoJo wants to bring in 100 really big things, but all of her ideas seem to come up short. Granny Tickle pays JoJo a visit and gives her a brand-new toy, a Hip-Hop Happy Hoop. JoJo loves the toy and all of the tricks that she can do with it. She loves it so much that she keeps playing with it without letting her friends have a turn --- and soon finds them off playing without her.
34	9	"Charlie the Clown Baby Returns" "The Fishing Trip"	John Schnall and Tim Snyder	Claudia Silver Annie Evans	February 23, 2005
JoJo, Goliath, and her father take Charlie to Uncle Flippy's Funny Farm for a visit, but chaos ensues when Charlie wanders off and discovers a whole new way to tour the farm. JoJo and her friends go "clowny-fishing" with her father and Goliath accidentally unplugs the lake's plug and JoJo and her friends try to rescue the Clowny-fishes.
35	10	"Goliath Gets a Boo Boo" "Join the Club"	John Schnall and Tim Snyder	Annie Evans Pammy Salmon	March 4, 2005
Goliath hurts himself while playing Follow the Leader by stepping on a splinter and JoJo and her mother take him to see Dr. Longtall the veterinarian, but Goliath felt a bit nervous, but JoJo discovers that others are also nervous as well and discover that laughter could stop their nervousness. It's "Bring Your Kids to Circus Town Club" day at the Circus Town Club and JoJo and her friends decide to create a club of their own, but disagree on a Silly Secret Signal for the club, but decided to combine all three into one code for their clubhouse.
36	11	"The Mane Event" "Stuck on You"	John Schnall and Tim Snyder	Becky Mode Jill Cozza	March 20, 2005
Goliath gets a mane-cut for the Big Whoop-De-Do celebration, but has a very hard time selecting the perfect mane-cut for him. Granny and Grampy Tickle come for a visit and JoJo is planning a juggling act with 10 balls with small clown faces on them, but need to paste 10 small noses, but overdo with the Super Duper Clown Paste and gets stuck with Goliath.
37	12	"The Robot Clown" "Mice-Capades"	John Schnall and Tim Snyder	John Schnall Susan Kim	March 27, 2005
JoJo and her father help Skeebo and his father assemble a robotic clown for their new act, but when both Mr. Tickle and Fire Chief Seltzer fail to read the instructions, JoJo, Goliath, Skeebo, and Harpo help them out. When Chico the mouse loses some of the items he needs for the Mouse Circus, after Fire Chief Seltzer mistakenly vacuumed up the items. JoJo, Goliath, and their friends find clever ways to use ordinary objects to replace the things Chico needs. Note: "Mice-Capades" shares a title with an episode of Nickelodeon's The Fairly OddParents as well as the animated short featuring Herman and Katnip and another with Tom and Jerry.
38	13	"A Circus Town Wedding"	John Schnall and Tim Snyder	Susan Kim	June 30, 2005
When Mrs. Kersplatski announced that she and Mr. Aldeberto Muscles are getting married and become Maya's stepmother, Maya fears that her father won't be able to spend time with her anymore and runs away from home but learns that her father loves her more than ever.
39	14	"Get Crabby" "Bouncing Bowling Ball"	John Schnall and Tim Snyder	Susan Kim Annie Evans	July 4, 2005
JoJo looks after the class pet, a clown crab named Cha-Cha, for the night and teaches Cha-Cha about nose-honking, but forgets to put the lid on his cage and must find him before going back to school. JoJo, Skeebo, and Croaky are in the finals of the Junior Bouncing Bowling Tournament and JoJo learns not to be nervous, but accidentally tosses the bouncing bowling ball to bounce outside and has everyone chasing it down.
40	15	"The Octopus Ride" "Hiccup Helpers"	John Schnall and Tim Snyder	Annie Evans Douglas Wood	July 11, 2005
JoJo, Goliath, and her friends are ready to ride the Octopus at the annual Circus Town Carnival, but Goliath and Dinky couldn't go the ride because they're too small, but both Goliath and Dinky found a ride they could go on. Skeebo gets the Hiccups and JoJo and her friends try to help cure them.
41	16	"Follow That Monkey" "X Marks the Spot"	John Schnall and Tim Snyder	Peggy Sarlin Susan Kim	July 18, 2005
JoJo, Trina, and Skeebo play a game of "Monkey See, Monkey Do" after the monkeys who are part of Mr. Tickle's new act escape from the Big Top and run loose into Trina's house causing chaotic mayhem in the process. Note: This was the only time the Monkeys took JoJo to the Spotlight instead of The Fire Clowns. JoJo and her friends go on a pirate treasure hunt after finding a map in a bottle finding clues along the way towards the treasure.
42	17	"Happy Hoppy Day" "Brushing Up"	John Schnall and Tim Snyder	Susan Kim	July 25, 2005
JoJo and her classmates celebrate a new holiday that the Frogini Brothers brought over from the "Old Country" and learn about the traditions of Happy Hoppy Day. JoJo, Croaky, and Skeebo go to the Big Kid Toothbrush Tree to help Goliath get a new toothbrush and to the Big Kid Toothpaste Tree after Goliath outgrows his baby toothbrush and toothpaste, and relearns how to brush his teeth.
43	18	"The Cricketeers" "Tickled Pink"	John Schnall and Tim Snyder	Susan Kim Douglas Wood	August 8, 2005
A musical family band, the Cricketeers are coming to the Big Top for a concert but Hector gets separated from his wife, Gracie (whom Goliath had a crush on), and his son, Cody, so JoJo and her friends help out in finding them by making cricket chirps. While at the Barbecue at the Seltzer's home, JoJo accidentally eats some merry berries, a summertime treat that she is allergic to, which causes her to turn pink and itchy and causes her nose to swell up and learn how some certain types of food allergies can be dangerous if not treated in time.
44	19	"Practice Makes Perfect" "Happy Not-Birthday Skeebo"	John Schnall and Tim Snyder	Douglas Wood Susan Kim	August 29, 2005
JoJo accidentally breaks a toy calliope that she was going to give to Maya for her birthday, but decides to perform "The Circus Song" on a real calliope for her birthday. JoJo, Goliath, and their friends decide to throw a surprise "not-birthday" party for Skeebo after he spent his birthday at his grandparents.
45	20	"Best Pet in Circus Town" "Picture Perfect"	John Schnall and Tim Snyder	Cate Lieuwen Claudia Silver	September 26, 2005
Terrific the Tiger Tamer arrives in Circus Town to judge a pet show (only open for dogs and cats) and JoJo helps Skeebo and Trina to train their pets. It's Class Picture Day at the Circus Town Clown School, but chaos erupts when Skeebo's pet rabbit wouldn't cooperate during the photoshoot.
46	21	"Make It Snappy" "Harpo Come Home"	John Schnall and Tim Snyder	Peggy Sarlin John Schnall	October 3, 2005
JoJo and her friends make a batch of clownberry juice for the annual fundraiser for the school, but as they rushed to make the next batch, they forgot to add the clownberries. While playing Whirling Whizmo (a type of Frisbee game), Skeebo's pet dog, Harpo disappears while chasing after a Clown Bird and JoJo, Goliath, Skeebo, and their friends search all over Circus Town for Harpo.
47	22	"Circus Town Hoedown" "Time Flies"	John Schnall and Tim Snyder	Becky Mode Douglas Wood	November 14, 2005
It's the annual Hoedown at Uncle Flippy's Funny Farm and JoJo learns about square dancing and helps fill in for Uncle Flippy after he lost his voice during the Hoedown. Mr. Tickle brings home a cuckoo clock for JoJo from the Cuckoo Forest but it doesn't want to cuckoo and discovers that the small bird wasn't a real cuckoo and receives a real cuckoo in exchange.
48	23	"The Thanksgiving Hip-Hooray Parade"	John Schnall and Tim Snyder	Douglas Wood	November 20, 2005
The Annual Thanksgiving Hip Hooray Parade is in jeopardy when Mrs. Kersplatski is hospitalized after breaking her elbow and JoJo and her friends bring the parade to Mrs. Kersplatski and the patients at the Big Boo Boo Hospital.
49	24	"A Quiet Magic" "Too Many Toys"	John Schnall and Tim Snyder	James Ponti Jill Cozza	December 5, 2005
Skeebo brings his cousin Alex (who is hearing-impaired) to school for a mind-reading act who uses sign language as part of the act and teaches JoJo and her friends how to uses sign language. JoJo and her family have a yard sale and learn to depart with the toys that she has outgrown and doesn't play with anymore.
50	25	"Silly Silly Putt-Putt" "Ride 'em Goliath"	John Schnall and Tim Snyder	John Schnall Annie Evans	January 6, 2006
JoJo accidentally loses her father's prize trophy golf ball during a game of Silly Putt-Putt. Goliath is ready to ride the Wacky Cycle (Unicycle) without the training wheels, but is afraid of falling off, so JoJo teaches Goliath how to keep his balance on the Wacky Cycle.
51	26	"The Giggle Kite" "Chores Galore"	John Schnall and Tim Snyder	Samantha Tate Cate Lieuwen	January 6, 2006
After her kite was accidentally torn, JoJo received her father a special kite that needs laughter to fly. JoJo and Goliath helps out doing chores around the house with her parents, but disaster happens when a box of laundry detergent falls into the washing machine and Uncle Flippy's Laffabilly Goat escapes from his pen and didn't realize later that everything did work out after all.
52	27	"A Snowclown for Dinky" "Skating Away"	John Schnall and Tim Snyder	Susan Kim	January 23, 2006
It's a snow day in Circus Town, but Dinky has the sniffles and couldn't come out and play in the snow, so JoJo and her friends help build a "snowclown" for him and bring it to his house. JoJo and Goliath go ice skating with Trina and her mother, but don't know how to skate, so Trina teach them how to ice skate, but when Trina injures her knee on a twig sticking out of the pond, JoJo skates her way to Mrs. Tightrope for help.
53	28	"Simply Ear-Resistible" "Hula Is Cool-a"	John Schnall and Tim Snyder	Jack Matosian Jymn Magon	March 20, 2006
JoJo created a pair of Really Silly Bunny Ears for the annual Springtime Celebration pageant at the Little Big Top Circus School, but discovers that the other students are wearing regular plain store bought Bunny Ears for the pageant instead of making their own. JoJo later asks Jumberto Jackrabbit for help and learns that everyone can be different. JoJo returns to school from a fun Summer Vacation at Hula Bula, but forgot the videotape that she was going to show to her classmates during Show and Tell.

=== Season 3 (2006–07) ===
No. overall	No. in season	Title	Directed by	Written by	Original release date
54	1	"Princess for a Day"	John Schnall and Tim Snyder	Peggy Sarlin	July 17, 2006
JoJo switches places for a day with her lookalike cousin, Princess Josephina, alongside pet lions Goliath and Hercules. Soon, JoJo learns that being a princess isn't as fun as it looked and Princess Josephina learned that being a clown isn't as fun as it looked either.
55	2	"Pie in the Sky"	John Schnall and Tim Snyder	Douglas Wood	August 29, 2006
JoJo and her clown scout friends are going on a special camping trip to Uncle Flippy's farm to celebrate the first day of spring. That day is also the beginning of the "cream pie in the sky" season, which works almost like a meteor shower. But when they find Uncle Flippy's farm has been "creamed", JoJo gathers the entire town to help save the farm.
56	3	"My Granny's Shoes"	John Schnall and Tim Snyder	Douglas Wood	September 10, 2006
As JoJo visits her grandparents to learn circus acts that her grandparents did in their youth for the annual "Pass It On" show in the Big Top, she notices that her grandmother is having issues remembering things so JoJo helps her remember things alongside her family by inviting Grampy and Granny to stay with them.
57	4	"JoJo and the Beanstalk"	John Schnall and Tim Snyder	Nicole Dubuc	November 20, 2006
An episode based on "Jack and the Beanstalk" has JoJo and her friends on an adventure climbing up a beanstalk that they grew with some magic beans that were given to them by Jumberto Jackrabbit and helping a friendly giant named Normus (who at first was scared of JoJo and her friends) and his pet chipmunk Cozy and helps the former win the annual Laughter in the Sky contest in the annual picnic and dispelling a rumor that Normus was a mean giant (which the townsfolk didn't realize that his laughter was too strong and loud, which caused the destruction to their town) and helps save the picnic by blowing away the storm clouds that threatened to ruin it.
58	5	"Circus Town Makeover"	John Schnall and Tim Snyder	Douglas Wood	January 7, 2007
JoJo and the Spudinskis appear on the television program "Circus Town Makeover" hosted by Jumping Jack as guests where JoJo discussed how one day, the Spudinskis were stuck on the couch and the entire town tried to get them off the couch and how Jumping Jack came and help the Spudinskis to exercise and eat healthier and having them do a brand new act on television. Note: This was the only time that JoJo didn't do the "Spotlight Moment" sequence, allowing the Spudinskis the honor of doing the segment instead. This episode could have been a special to celebrate the end of the series.
59	6	"My Clowny Valentine" "Hop Hooey!"	John Schnall and Tim Snyder	Douglas Wood John Schnall	February 14, 2007
JoJo learns how to make a valentine for a friend who is far away. JoJo learns how to calm down during frustrating situations and learns a new game that Croaky calls Hop Hooey.

== Feeling Good with JoJo ==
Feeling Good with JoJo is a series of five-minute shorts that were a spin-off of JoJo's Circus. The series featured JoJo Tickle and her pet lion Goliath teaching the viewers yoga lessons. Sometimes one of the show's characters were involved. In the intro, JoJo would stand in front of the stage, spin around and magically have her hair tied up in a bun while wearing a yellow shirt with a clown on it. The shorts run from February 24, 2006 to May 16, 2008, spanning 2 seasons with a total of 20 episodes.

=== Episodes ===
- Snakes
- Bears
- Windshield Wipers
- Reach for the Sun Stretch
- Clown Shoe Stretch

== See also ==
- PB&J Otter
- Allegra's Window
- Stanley
- Higglytown Heroes
- Pinky Dinky Doo
