= List of Pinky Dinky Doo episodes =

The episodes of children's series Pinky Dinky Doo began production in 2005 and first aired on Noggin from 2006 to 2009. They were originally broadcast as 26 episodes with two 8-minute segments each.

== Series overview ==
Season	Episodes	Originally released	
Season	Episodes	First released	Last released
1	52	April 10, 2006	March 29, 2007
2	52	September 7, 2008	September 18, 2009

== Episodes ==
=== Season 1 (2006–2007) ===
No.	Title	Written by	Storyboarded by	Great Big Fancy Word	Original air date (U.S.)
1	"Where Are My Shoes?"	Jim Jinkins & Mark York	Jeff Buckland & Irene Wu	Exasperated	April 11, 2006
Interactive moments: What came first?* and Eat It or Wear It?*
2	"Pinky Dinky Doo and the Outer Space Fluffy Buns"	Mark York	Diane Kredensor & Irene Wu	Predicament	April 11, 2006
Interactive moments: What's the name of my story?* and Which is the right Pinky?*
3	"Tyler's Great Big Solo"	Mark Palmer	Ryan Sias	Magnificent	April 13, 2006
Interactive moments: What is that sound?* and What came first?
4	"Polka Dot Pox"	Mark York	Liz Rathke	Frustrated	April 10, 2006
Interactive moments: Who is this?* and Which is the right Pinky?
5	"Pinky and the Grumpy Alligator"	Nicole Dubuc	Atomic Cartoons Inc.	Grumpy	April 17, 2006
Interactive moments: Who is this? and Eat It or Wear It?
6	"The Horn and Antler Club"	Mark Palmer	Bob Cavin III	Ridiculous	April 17, 2006
Interactive moments: Who said this?* and Great Big Fancy Word Game*
7	"Tyler Dinky Doo and the Pirate Crew"	Ken Koonce & Michael Merton	Scott Cooper	Exhilarating	April 19, 2006
Interactive moments: What came first? and Which is the right Pinky?
8	"Pinky Dinky Doo and the Missing Dinosaurs"	Nicole Dubuc	Chick'n Skratch Animation	Investigate	April 19, 2006
Interactive moments: Great Big Fancy Word Game and What is that sound?
9	"Pinky Dinky Doo and the Pizza Artist"	David Lewman	Tim Parsons	Masterpiece	April 21, 2006
Interactive moments: Great Big Fancy Word Game and Who is this?
10	"Pinky Dinky Doo and the Party Animals"	Don Gillies	Alisa Grodsky	Celebration	April 21, 2006
Interactive moments: What's the name of my story? and What came first?
11	"Tyler's Tall O'Meter"	Robert David	Ryan Sias	Gargantuan	March 28, 2007
Interactive moments: Great Big Fancy Word Game and Which is the right Pinky?
12	"Pinky Dinky Doo and the Cloud People"	Michele Cavin	Liz Rathke	Commotion	March 28, 2007
Interactive moments: What came first? and What is that Sound?
13	"Tyler Dinky Doo's Big Boo"	Ken Koonce & Michael Merton	Irene Wu	Terrifying	October 31, 2006
Interactive moments: Eat It or Wear It? and Which is the right Tyler?
14	"Pinky and the New Teacher"	Nicole Dubuc	Atomic Cartoons Inc.	Hubbub	October 31, 2006
Interactive moments: Who said this? and Where is Pinky?*
15	"Tyler to the Rescue!"	Nicole Dubuc	Mike Wetterhahn	Flabbergasted	April 27, 2006
Interactive moments: Who said this? and Who is this?
16	"Shrinky Pinky"	Lisa Jinkins	David Steele	Shrink	April 27, 2006
Interactive moments: What came first? and Where is Pinky?
17	"Tyler's Too Cool Game"	Annie Evans	Nicole Hatch & Stephan Martiniere	Engrossed	April 30, 2006
Interactive moments: Who said this? and What's the name of my story?
18	"Come Home, Little Guinea Pig"	Mark York	Tim Parsons	Responsibility	April 10, 2006
Interactive moments: What came first? and Eat It or Wear It?
19	"Pinky and the Super Spaghetti Knot"	David Lewman	Liz Rathke	Stupendous	April 24, 2006
Interactive moments: What's the name of my story? and Eat It or Wear It?
20	"Back to School is Cool"	Lisa Jinkins	Ryan Sias	Apprehensive	April 24, 2006
Interactive moments: What came first? and Which is the right Pinky?
21	"Tyler Dinky Doo's Sporting News"	Mark Palmer	Bob Cavin III	Enthusiastic	March 29, 2007
Interactive moments: What came first? and Who is this?
22	"Dragon Needs a Sippy Cup"	David Lewman	Atomic Cartoons Inc.	Calamity	March 29, 2007
Interactive moments: What's the name of my story? and Great Big Fancy Word Game
23	"Tyler Dinky Doo and the Legend of Twigfoot"	Ken Koonce & Michael Merton	Nebuchadnezzar "Neb" O'Toole	Hideous	March 26, 2007
Interactive moments: Great Big Fancy Word Game and What's the name of my story?
24	"Pinky and the Big Rainy Day"	Annie Evans	Mike Wetterhahn	Cacophony	March 26, 2007
Interactive moments: What came first? and What is that sound?
25	"Pinky's Awful Good Day"	Don Gillies	Tim Parsons	Unflappable	April 26, 2006
Interactive moments: Who is this? and What came first?
26	"Tyler's Neat-O Tuxedo"	Pammy Salmon	Nicole Hatch & Stephan Martiniere	Dapper	April 26, 2006
Interactive moments: Great Big Fancy Word Game and Where is Pinky?
27	"Pinky's Wintery Dintery Doo"	Nicole Dubuc	Ryan Sias	Bizarre	May 1, 2006
Interactive moments: What came first? and Who said this?
28	"Pinky's Great Big Concert"	Mark York	Liz Rathke	Experiment	May 1, 2006
Interactive moments: What's the name of my story? and What is that sound?
29	"The Great Big Cheese Chase"	Jill Cozza-Turner	David Steele	Culprit	May 3, 2006
Interactive moments: What is that sound? and Which is the right monster?
30	"Try It, You'll Like It...Pretty Much"	Nicole Dubuc	Mike Wetterhahn	Scrumptious	May 3, 2006
Interactive moments: Eat It or Wear It? and Who said this?
31	"Pinky Dinky Duplicate"	Michele Cavin	Bob Cavin III	Duplicate	May 5, 2006
Interactive moments: Who said this? and Great Big Fancy Word Game
32	"I Want That"	David Lewman	Nebuchadnezzar "Neb" O'Toole	Accumulate	May 5, 2006
Interactive moments: What came first? and Where is Pinky?
33	"Boom! Sonic Boom!"	Ken Koonce & Michael Merton	Tim Parsons	Incredible	May 8, 2006
Interactive moments: Who said this? and What is that sound?
34	"Pinky the Pet"	P. Kevin Strader	Nicole Hatch & Stephan Martiniere	Habitat	May 8, 2006
Interactive moments: What came first? and Where is Pinky?
35	"Guppy Training Day"	Pammy Salmon	Liz Rathke	Gigantic	May 10, 2006
Interactive moments: Great Big Fancy Word Game and What came first?
36	"Pinky and the Babysitter"	Krista Tucker	Ryan Sias	Skeptical	May 10, 2006
Interactive moments: Who is this? and What came first?
37	"Tyler's Lucky Sock"	Nicole Dubuc	Nebuchadnezzar "Neb" O'Toole	Decipher	May 12, 2006
Interactive moments: What is the name of my story? and Who is this?
38	"Tyler's Best Sleepover Ever"	Cate Lieuwen	David Concepcion	Agenda	May 12, 2006
Interactive moments: What came first? and What is that sound?
39	"Pinky's Big Talent"	Michele Cavin	Nebuchadnezzar "Neb" O'Toole	Talent	April 28, 2006
Interactive moments: What came first? and Where is Pinky?
40	"Pinky Dinky Re-Doo"	Mark Palmer	Irene Wu	Vanished	April 28, 2006
Interactive moments: Who said this? and What is that sound?
41	"Tyler's Super Family"	Mark York	Tim Parsons	Xylophone	May 15, 2006
Interactive moments: What is that sound? and What's the name of my story?
42	"Pinky and the Ice Cream Babies"	P. Kevin Strader	Nicole Hatch & Stephan Martiniere	Professional	May 15, 2006
Interactive moments: What came first? and Eat It or wear It?
43	"Mr. Guinea Pig and the Big Bone"	Mark York	Ryan Sias	Assemble	May 17, 2006
Interactive moments: What came first? and Who said this?
44	"Mr. Guinea Pig, Superstar"	David Lewman	Liz Rathke	Ukulele	May 17, 2006
Interactive moments: Great Big Fancy Word Game and Who is this?
45	"Pinky and the Pink Phenomenon"	Cate Lieuwen	Nebuchadnezzar "Neb" O'Toole	Phenomenon	May 19, 2006
Interactive moments: What's the name of my story? and Who is this?
46	"Two-Wheel Dreams"	Pammy Salmon	Irene Wu	Impetuous	May 19, 2006
Interactive moments: What came first? and Who said this?
47	"Go to Bed, Tyler!"	Nicole Dubuc	Mike Wetterhahn	Bungle	May 22, 2006
Interactive moments: Who said this? and What's the name of my story?
48	"Mr. Guinea Pig's Loose Tooth"	Michele Cavin	Nebuchadnezzar "Neb" O'Toole	Labyrinth	May 22, 2006
Interactive moments: What is that sound? and Who is this?
49	"Think Pink"	Lisa Jinkins	Nicole Hatch & Stephan Martiniere	Voracious	May 24, 2006
Interactive moments: Great Big Fancy Word Game and Who is this?
50	"Tyler's First Flight"	Pammy Salmon	Tim Parsons	Skittish	May 24, 2006
Interactive moments: What came first? and Who said this?
51	"Pinky and the Castle of Cards"	Michele Cavin & Paul Zdanowicz	Nebuchadnezzar "Neb" O'Toole	Cautious	May 26, 2006
Interactive moments: Who is this? and What's the name of my story?
52	"Daddy's Special Shirt"	Mark York	Mike Wetterhahn	Tenacious	May 26, 2006
Interactive moments: What came first? and Who said this?

=== Season 2 (2008–2009) ===
No.	Title	Written by	Storyboarded by	Great Big Fancy Word	Original air date (U.S.)
53	"Pinky Thinky Doo"	Lisa Jinkins	Michael Tweedle	Discouraged	March 2011 (Netflix)
Interactive moments: What came first? and What was my Big Idea?*
54	"Big Brain Block"	Ellen Shanman	Ron Nantel	Storyteller	September 15, 2009
Interactive moments: Was this a setting?* and What came first?
55	"Tooting Trunk"	Ellen Shanman	Ron Nantel	Disruptive	September 7, 2008
Interactive moments: What's the name of my story? and Was this a setting?
56	"In the Dark!"	Butch D'Ambrosio	Michael Tweedle	Reluctant	September 12, 2008
Interactive moments: Eat It or Wear It? and What was my Big Idea?
57	"Stinky Pinky Doo!"	Lisa Jinkins	Chris Bloomer and Terry Ververgaert	Mortified	September 10, 2008
Interactive moments: Great Big Fancy Word Game and What was my Big Idea?
58	"Kooky Cook-Off!"	Lisa Jinkins	Darren Cranford and Eva Smith	Collaborate	September 7, 2008
Interactive moments: Eat It or Wear It? and Who were the Main Characters?*
59	"Speed Rocket"	John Driver	Ron Nantel	Persistent	June 14, 2009
Interactive moments: What's the name of my story? and Who were the Main Characters?
60	"The Great Biscotti"	Ellen Shanman	Terry Ververgaert	Expert	September 9, 2008
Interactive moments: What's the name of my story? and What was my Big Idea?
61	"The Trip Not Taken!"	Ellen Shanman	Terry Ververgaert	Journey	March 16, 2009
Interactive moments: What came first? and What was my Big Idea?
62	"Always Ask First"	Ellen Shanman	Darren Cranford and Todd Petersen	Permission	March 2011 (Netflix)
Interactive moments: Eat It or Wear It? and What was my Big Idea?
63	"Burpzilla"	Butch D'Ambrosio	Bojan Redzic and Dimitri Kostic	Concentrate	September 11, 2008
Interactive moments: Which is the right Pinky? and Was this a setting?
64	"Happy Burp Day!"	Lisa Jinkins	Chris Bloomer	Unique	September 11, 2008
Interactive moments: Who were the Main Characters? and Was this a setting?
65	"Tyler's Storybox Disaster"	Lisa Jinkins	Ron Nantel	Dilemma	September 9, 2008
Interactive moments: What came first? and Who were the Main Characters?
66	"Balloony Feet"	Stacey Luftig	Mike Collins and Ron Nantel	Quest	March 2011 (Netflix)
Interactive moments: What's the name of my story? and Who were the Main Characters?
67	"Big Blob of Talk"	Lisa Jinkins	Chris Bloomer	Hullabaloo	September 10, 2008
Interactive moments: What's the name of my story? and Who were the Main Characters?
68	"Vicki Chicken"	Jessica Gentile	Alain-Heese Boutin	Flustered	September 7, 2008
Interactive moments: What came first? and What was my Big Idea?
69	"The Thundering Thesaurus"	Lisa Jinkins	Alain-Heese Boutin	Thesaurus	March 2011 (Netflix)
Interactive moments: Which is the right Pinky? and What came first?
70	"The Pinkys Rock!"	Stacey Luftig	Terry Ververgaert	Procrastinating	September 8, 2008
Interactive moments: Which is the right Pinky? and Was this a Setting?
71	"The Mystery Planet"	Lisa Jinkins	Darren Cranford and Terry Ververgaert	Assume	September 7, 2008
Interactive moments: What came first? and Who were the Main Characters?
72	"Octopus in Tap Shoes"	Ellen Shanman	Terry Ververgaert	Substitute	March 18, 2009
Interactive moments: What came first? and Was this a setting?
73	"Pinky Dinky Rex"	Ellen Shanman	Dave MacDougall	Vegetarian	September 16, 2008
Interactive moments: What's the name of my story? and What was my Big Idea?
74	"Puppy-Go-Seek"	Ellen Shanman	Michael Tweedle	Panic	September 8, 2008
Interactive moments: Eat It or Wear It? and What came first?
75	"Pop the Corn"	Ellen Shanman	Michael Tweedle	Suspense	September 12, 2008
Interactive moments: Eat It or Wear It? and Who were the Main Characters?
76	"Lord of the Pies"	Ellen Shanman	Kevin Scarborough	Arbitrary	September 15, 2008
Interactive moments: Eat It or Wear It? and Was this a setting?
77	"Great Big Nature"	Ellen Shanman	Kevin Scarborough	Adventure	March 2011 (Netflix)
Interactive moments: What's the name of my story? and Was this a setting?
78	"Monkey Town"	Lisa Jinkins	Alain Heese-Boutin	Improvise	June 14, 2009
Interactive moments: Which is the right Pinky? and What came first?
79	"Loch Mess Lobster"	Gary Wallace	Terry Ververgaert	Polluted	April 22, 2009
Interactive moments: Great Big Fancy Word Game and What came first?
80	"Super Doo and Traffic Too"	Jessica Gentile	Dave MacDougall and Eva Smith	Considerate	April 22, 2009
Interactive moments: What's the name of my story? and Which is the right Pinky?
81	"The Two Daffinees"	Livia Beasley	Stephan Perreault	Competitive	March 2011 (Netflix)
Interactive moments: Was this a setting? and What was my Big Idea?
82	"Hot Hot Hot"	Ellen Shanman	Michael Tweedle	Observe	March 2011 (Netflix)
Interactive moments: Who were the Main Characters? and What came first?
83	"The Legend of Big Blue"	Lisa Jinkins	Chris Bloomer and Steve Lowles	Instructions	March 17, 2009
Interactive moments: Was this a setting? and Which is the right Pinky?
84	"Ponytail Power!"	Lisa Jinkins	Dave MacDougall	Tenacity	March 18, 2009
Interactive moments: Was this a setting? and What came first?
85	"Pinky's Perfect Present"	Ellen Shanman	Terry Ververgaert and Mike Collins	Gracious	March 17, 2009
Interactive moments: Who were the Main Characters? and What was my Big Idea?
86	"Pinky Squeaks"	Jeff Buckland	Michael Tweedle	Mystery	October 26, 2008
Interactive moments: Who were the Main Characters? and What was my Big Idea?
87	"Great Big Bean Festival"	Lisa Jinkins	Holly Smirnov	Colossal	September 16, 2009
Interactive moments: Great Big Fancy Word Game and What's the name of my story?
88	"Are You My Mummy?"	Ellen Shanman	Terry Ververgaert	Reunited	October 26, 2008
Interactive moments: What's the name of my story? and Who were the Main Characters?
89	"Tyler's Silly Shirt"	Jeff Buckland	Holly Smirnov	Distinctive	September 17, 2009
Interactive moments: Was this a setting? and What was my Big Idea?
90	"Pinky's Missing Page"	Jeff Buckland	Jay Stuckless	Incomplete	September 16, 2009
Interactive moments: What's the name of my story? and Which is the right Pinky?
91	"Tipsy Topsy"	Ellen Shanman	Cody Collins	Volume	March 2011 (Netflix)
Interactive moments: Was this a setting? and What came first?
92	"Growing Up Stretchy"	Lisa Jinkins	Chris Bloomer and Holly Smirnov	Natural	March 2011 (Netflix)
Interactive moments: What's the name of my story? and Which is the right Pinky?
93	"Squeedorp Grand"	Ellen Shanman	Darren Cranford	Essential	March 19, 2009
Interactive moments: Eat It or Wear It? and Was this a setting?
94	"The Pinky-Riffic Hat"	Lisa Jinkins	Mike Collins	Quirky	March 2011 (Netflix)
Interactive moments: Great Big Fancy Word Game and Which is the right Pinky?
95	"Tyler and the 4 M's"	David Baron	Eva Smith, Darren Cranford, and Holly Smirnov	Comfortable	September 17, 2009
Interactive moments: Was this a setting? and What came first?
96	"A Promise is a Promise"	Lisa Rao and Jessica Gentile	Stephan Perreault	Dependable	March 2011 (Netflix)
Interactive moments: Who were the Main Characters? and What came first?
97	"What's Bugging Tyler"	Lisa Goldman	Terry Ververgaert and Hongsuk Kim	Environment	March 19, 2009
Interactive moments: Great Big Fancy Word Game and Who were the Main Characters?
98	"Mr. Guinea Pig's Museum"	Jeff Buckland	Daniel Man	Collection	March 2011 (Netflix)
Interactive moments: Great Big Fancy Word Game and What was my Big Idea?
99	"Teeny Weeny Waste"	Ellen Shanman	Jay Stuckless	Conserve	September 18, 2009
Interactive moments: Was this a setting? and Who were the Main Characters?
100	"Pinky and the Duck"	Lisa Jinkins	Eva Smith	Doodle	September 18, 2009
Interactive moments: Great Big Fancy Word Game and What's the name of my story?
101	"Great Big New Year"	Lisa Jinkins	Holly Smirnov	Tradition	December 28, 2008
Interactive moments: What was my Big Idea? and Who were the Main Characters?
102	"Pinky's Happy Doo Year"	Jeff Buckland	Michael Tweedle	Motivated	December 28, 2008
Interactive moments: Was this a setting? and What's the name of my story?
103	"Pinky's Silliest Story"	Lisa Jinkins	Cody Collins	Random	September 14, 2009
Interactive moments: Eat It or Wear It? and What's the name of my story?
104	"Tyler's Big Idea"	Lisa Jinkins	Holly Smirnov	Imagination	September 14, 2009
Interactive moments: Who were the Main Characters? and What came first?
