= David Ray Campbell =

American screenwriter

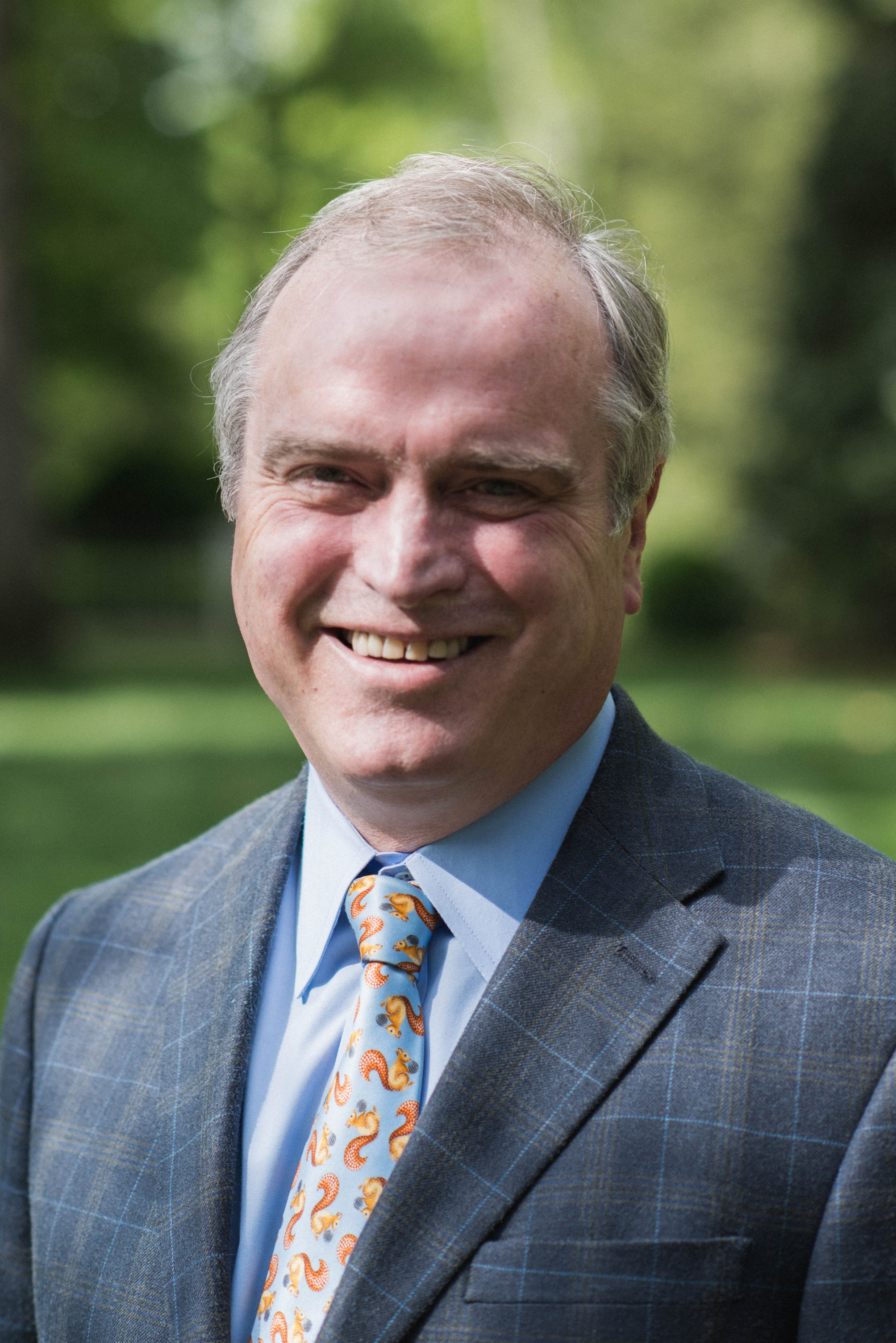
- Campbell in 2014
- Born: July 1, 1954 (age 72); Palatka, Florida, U.S.
- Education: Harding University
- Occupations: Writer, television & theater producer, comedy manager
- Years active: 1979–present
- Known for: Doug (1991–1994, 1996–1999); Allegra's Window (1994–1996); PB&J Otter (1998–2002); Stanley (2001–2007); JoJo's Circus (2003–2007); Pinky Dinky Doo (2006–2011)
- Spouse: Donna Campbell
- Children: 2

David Ray Campbell (born July 1, 1954) is an American television writer, theater producer, and former comedy manager. With his partner, Jim Jinkins, Campbell helped create the Nickelodeon animated television series Doug, which launched the Nicktoons brand. He is also the co-founder of Jumbo Pictures and Cartoon Pizza, and is currently developing the Broadway musical Holy Fire!

== Biography and career ==
Campbell was born in Palatka, Florida and grew up in Searcy, Arkansas.

He began his career working on many theatrical productions in New York and Los Angeles as a stage manager. He later produced such show business legends as Mickey Rooney, Ann Miller, Carol Channing, and Donald O’Connor in multiple productions of Sugar Babies, which played more than 1,200 performances on Broadway.

Campbell was also the founder and director of a New York talent management company, helping launch the early careers of Louis CK, Brett Butler, The Higgins Boys and Gruber, and television series including Mystery Science Theater 3000 and Grace Under Fire.

David and his partner Jim Jinkins would go on to create Doug after Jinkins showed Campbell doodlings of the character at a small restaurant in New York. The series received the 1993 and 1994 Parents’ Choice Awards and the 1995 Kids’ Choice Award. It was also nominated for three Cable ACE Awards, four Emmys as Best Animated Children’s Show and the prestigious Prix Jeunesse International Award. Following the success of Doug, Walt Disney Studios acquired Jumbo Pictures, and made Doug the anchor of ABC’s Saturday morning lineup. It became a top-rated show, and inspired various books, merchandise, a live musical stage show, and a theatrical feature.

He has been the Executive Producer on more than 300 episodes of award-winning children’s television including 101 Dalmatians: The Series, PB&J Otter, Stanley, JoJo's Circus, The Beginner’s Bible, Pinky Dinky Doo, and many more.

Most recently, Campbell was the Chief Content Officer at Dance Network, a digital television network in Nashville, TN. He is also working on several new projects including the video series, HoopDogz, winner of the Parent’s Dove Awards and Holy Fire, a Broadway-bound musical comedy.

Campbell resides in Nashville, Tennessee with his wife and two daughters.
