= Jumbo Pictures =

Animation studio

Jumbo Pictures, Inc.
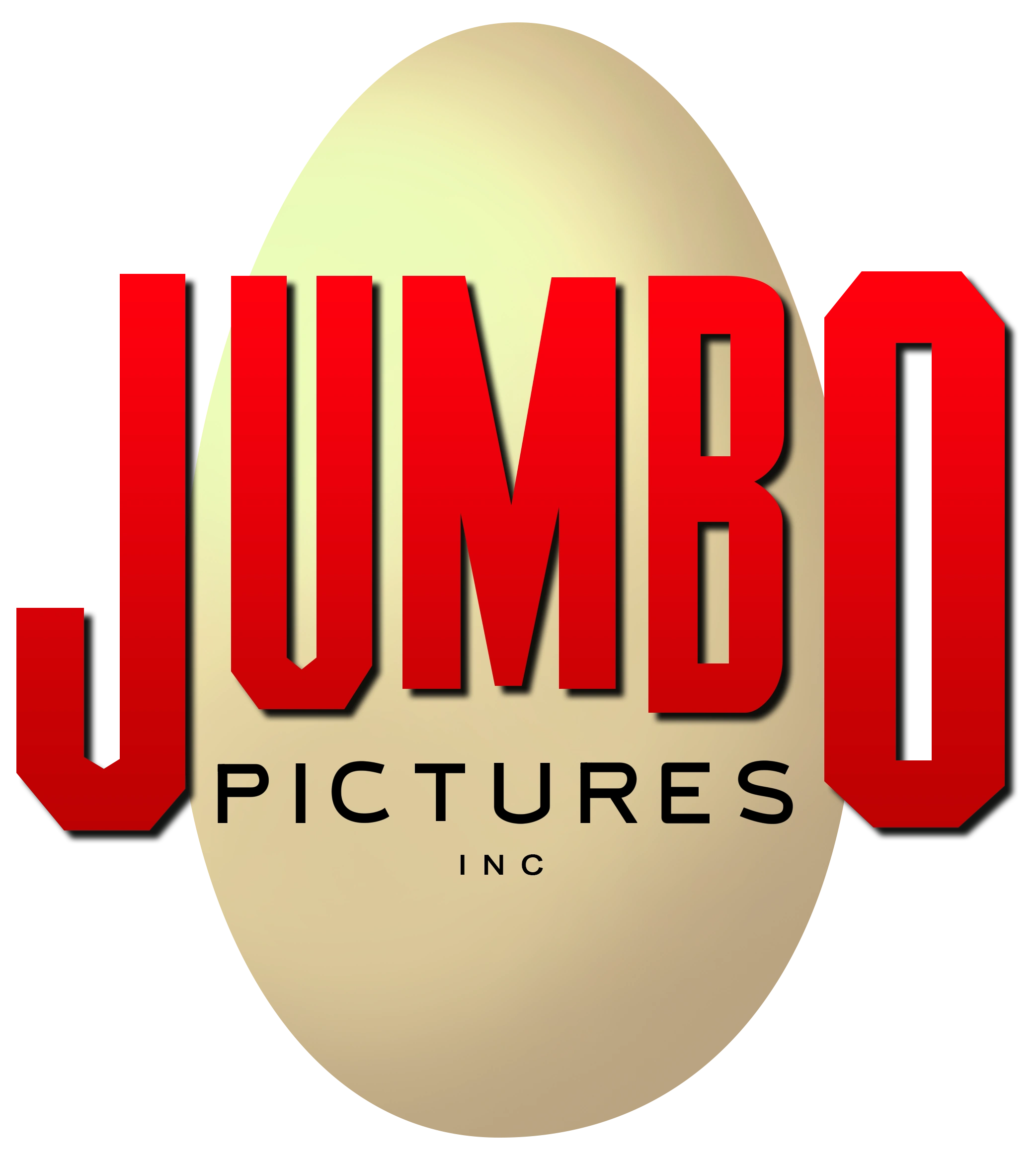
- Type: Subsidiary
- Industry: Entertainment
- Genre: Animation
- Founded: July 20, 1990; 36 years ago
- Founders: Jim Jinkins; David Campbell
- Defunct: January 1, 2001; 25 years ago
- Fate: Dissolved
- Successor: TV: Cartoon Pizza; Library: Disney Television Animation
- Headquarters: New York, United States
- Production output: Animation
- Parent: The Walt Disney Company (1996–2000)

Jumbo Pictures, Inc. was an American animation studio founded by Jim Jinkins and David Campbell on July 20, 1990. It is best known for the animated series Doug and was acquired by The Walt Disney Company in 1996. It dissolved in 2001.

== History ==
The company's first production, Doug, aired on Nickelodeon from 1991 to 1994, and it became a massive success.

When the show became a hit, the company, in conjunction with Nickelodeon, partnered with French producer Ellipse Programme to conceive new properties, to which Ellipse would hold overseas rights and Nickelodeon would hold North and South American broadcasting and distribution rights. The first two projects were the second season of Doug itself, and a planned cartoon that ultimately never materialized, Mot.

The company also produced the preschool series Allegra's Window for Nick Jr., which also became a success. The company also produced ESPN's first attempted foray into animation, Hoyt 'n Andy's Sportsbender, but the show never actually aired. It even produced four installments in the Richard Scarry's Best Videos Ever! series, released in 1993 (for the former two) and 1994 (for the latter two) by Random House Home Video.

On February 29, 1996, The Walt Disney Company, which had completed its acquisition of Capital Cities/ABC, Inc. nearly three weeks prior on February 9, acquired the company, primarily to add Doug to its IP roster. The acquisition was first announced in January, subsequently after MTV Networks sold its rights to the Doug IP back to Jumbo, while subsequently choosing to retain the rights to all prior episodes of the series. Jumbo Pictures' Doug had been a key show of Disney's One Saturday Morning since 1997. Jumbo Pictures also produced one film, Doug's 1st Movie, which was released in 1999. The founders each had a five-year contract in place with Disney from 1996 to 2001. Jumbo also collaborated with West Coast-based sister studio Walt Disney Television Animation on the television adaptation of 101 Dalmatians in 1997.

The studio dissolved by the very beginning of 2001 after beginning production on Stanley. Subsequently, the founders would found Cartoon Pizza, with Stanley being the new studio's first completed production.

== Filmography ==
Title	Year	Network	Notes
Doug	1991–1999	Nickelodeon (seasons 1–4); ABC (seasons 5–7)	Co-production with Ellipse Programmé (seasons 2–4)
Allegra's Window	1994–1996	Nick Jr.	Live-action/puppet show; Co-production with Topstone Productions
The Beginner's Bible	1995–1996	Direct-to-video	Co-production with Sony Wonder and Time Life Video & Television
Hoyt 'n Andy's Sportsbender	1995–1996	ESPN	Co-production with Sony Wonder
101 Dalmatians: The Series	1997–1998	ABC/Syndication	Co-production with Walt Disney Television Animation
PB&J Otter	1998–2000	Playhouse Disney	
Doug's 1st Movie	1999	Theatrical film	Co-production with Walt Disney Pictures and Disney MovieToons
Sabrina: The Animated Series	1999	ABC/UPN	Pre-production services for 13 episodes for DIC Productions, L.P.
