= Cartoon Pizza =

American animation company

- Type: Animation studio
- Industry: Animation
- Predecessor: Jumbo Pictures
- Founded: 2001; 25 years ago
- Founders: Jim Jinkins; David Campbell
- Defunct: 2015; 11 years ago
- Fate: Dormancy
- Headquarters: Nashville, Tennessee, U.S. New York City, New York, U.S. (formerly)
- Key people: Jim Jinkins (president); David Campbell (CEO); Jack Spillum (president, Animation Production)
- Products: Stanley; JoJo's Circus; Pinky Dinky Doo
- Website: cartoonpizza.com (archived 11/21/2014)

Cartoon Pizza was an American independent animation studio located in Nashville, Tennessee. It was co-founded by Jim Jinkins and David Campbell, and served as the successor to Jinkins' former company, Jumbo Pictures.

The studio partnered with several studios to help produce their shows, including Disney, Sesame Workshop, and Cuppa Coffee Studios. The studio was formerly headquartered in New York City until 2011, when the company was relocated to Nashville, Tennessee.

== History ==
In February 1996, Jim Jinkins and David Campbell's former company Jumbo Pictures was acquired by the Walt Disney Company.

In 2001, subsequently after Jumbo Pictures was closed, Jinkins and Campbell formed Cartoon Pizza as a successor company. Jinkins was president, Campbell was CEO, Jack Spillum was president of animated productions, Ellie Copeland was vice president of finances and operations, and Beldeen Fortunato was vice president of administration. The company's first two productions, Stanley and JoJo's Circus, the former which was technically started on by predecessor Jumbo Pictures, were designed to fulfill the founders' pre-existing five-year contracts with Disney.

In October 2001, Cartoon Pizza agreed to a two-year non-exclusive production deal with Sesame Workshop, the creators of Sesame Street, Dragon Tales, and Sagwa, the Chinese Siamese Cat. Sesame Workshop agreed to house the company at their New York City office and handle international distribution. They would co-produce a minimum of six new kids' properties.

In 2002, the company partnered with IDT Media, via their subsidiary, Digital Production Solutions, to co-produce a yet-to-be-titled animated series.

The company became a co-production partner in Tiger Aspect Productions' animation division to develop a series titled Earth Kid. Gullane Entertainment became an equal partner in Earth Kid as the show's international distributor in April 2002, months before it was acquired by HIT Entertainment that September. Gullane also had three other projects in the works with Cartoon Pizza.

The company operated two separate subsidiaries, Cartoon Cola and Cartoon Candy.

In 2015, the company was dissolved after five years of dormancy.

== Productions ==
Title	Release date	Channel/block	Notes
Stanley	2001–2004	Playhouse Disney	
Sesame Street shorts	2003	PBS Kids	Co-production with Sesame Workshop
Monster Monster Trucks	2003	Unaired TV pilot	Co-production with IDT Entertainment
JoJo's Circus	2003–2007	Playhouse Disney	Co-production with Cuppa Coffee Studios
Hoop Dogz	2004	Direct-to-DVD	
Feeling Good with JoJo	2006–2008	Playhouse Disney	Co-production with Cuppa Coffee Studios
Pinky Dinky Doo	2006–2010	Noggin/Nick Jr.	Co-production with Sesame Workshop
