= Gwen Shepherd =

American actress

Gwendolyn J. Shepherd is an American actress. In the late 1970s and 1980s she performed in a number of musical theatre productions. From 1989 onwards she had a number of minor parts in prominent television series.

== Theatrical performances ==
Shepherd was one of the actresses to play Maria in the famous 1977 Houston Grand Opera production of Porgy and Bess in the San Francisco War Memorial Opera House. She reprised the role in the 1983 production at the Arie Crown Theater, Chicago, and in some performances of the revival on Broadway later in the same year.

She went on to play Evelline in the national touring production of The Wiz that ran from June 1978 to July 1979. In 1980 she was one of the three female singers in the off-Broadway production of Blues in the Night.

In 1984 Shepherd appeared in the Broadway production of the operetta Show Boat as Queenie. In 1986 she was an understudy in the original touring production of Legends, performing at least once during the tour, and in 1987 she was understudy as Rose in Stepping Out.

In 1988 she was "an ample and vocally strong Peaseblossom" in a Broadway production of A Midsummer Night's Dream (running December 7, 1987, to March 27, 1988).

== Television appearances ==
To television viewers Shepherd is best known for her various guest appearances in major television series over the period 1989–1994, including Webster, Knots Landing, Law & Order, Married People, Murder She Wrote, Family Matters, and most notably Seinfeld.

In the Seinfeld episode "The Stranded", Shepherd played a cashier who has an altercation with George Costanza after allegedly short-changing him for ten dollars.

Her voice appearance was Opal Otter on the Playhouse Disney series PB&J Otter.

== Film appearances ==
Shepherd also had minor roles in the films Easy Money (1983) and Penn & Teller Get Killed (1989).
