= PB&J Otter =

1998-2000 American TV series

- Title card featuring the title characters from left to right: Peanut, Butter, and Jelly
- Genre: Children's television series; Educational
- Created by: Jim Jinkins
- Directed by: Jeff Buckland
- Voices of: Adam Rose; Jenell Brook Slack; Gina Marie Tortorici; Gwen Shepherd; Chris Phillips; Cody Pennes; Eddie Korbich; Bruce Bayley Johnson; Jackie Hoffman; Nancy Giles; Corinne Orr
- Composers: Dan Sawyer (score and songs); Fred Newman (songs); Rich Mendoza (songs)
- Country of origin: United States
- Original language: English
- No. of seasons: 3
- No. of episodes: 65 (124 segments) (list of episodes)

Production
- Executive producers: Jim Jinkins; David Campbell
- Producers: JoEllyn Marlow (season 1); Bruce Knapp (seasons 2–3)
- Running time: 23 minutes
- Production companies: Jumbo Pictures; Walt Disney Television

Original release
- Network: Playhouse Disney
- Release: March 14, 1998 – October 23, 2000

PB&J Otter is an American animated children's television series that aired on Disney Channel's preschool block Playhouse Disney from March 14, 1998 to October 23, 2000. The series centers on the Otter family, who live in the rural fishing community of Lake Hoohaw. Most stories revolve around the three Otter kids: older brother Peanut, younger sister Jelly, and baby sister Butter, as well as their friends and neighbors.

The series was created by Jim Jinkins, who also created Doug and Allegra's Window, and executive-produced by David Campbell in close conjunction with Harvard University's Cognitive Skills Group, "Project Zero". The group's job was to monitor each and make sure the material had a positive educational message. The series features songs by Dan Sawyer, Fred Newman, and Rich Mendoza. 65 episodes were produced across three seasons.

In 2000, PB&J Otter was nominated for an Annie Award for "Outstanding Music in an Animated Series".

== Characters ==
=== Main ===
- Peanut Otter (voiced by Adam Rose) is the oldest child of the Otter family and the group's leader.
- Jelly Otter (voiced by Jenell Brook Slack) is the middle child of the Otter family and the other leader of the group.
- Baby Butter Otter (voiced by Gina Marie Tortorici) is the baby sister and the youngest member of the Otter family.
- Opal Otter (voiced by Gwen Shepherd) is PB&J's mother who is a housewife.
- Ernest Otter (voiced by Chris Phillips) is PB&J's father who runs a boat general store.
- Pinch Raccoon (voiced by Cody Pennes) is a fanciful raccoon and Jelly's best friend.
- Scootch Raccoon (voiced by Cody Pennes) is Pinch's little brother who likes crashing into stuff and occasionally causes trouble.
- Munchy Beaver (voiced by Chris Phillips) is a meek beaver who is one of Peanut's two best friends.
- Flick Duck (voiced by Eddie Korbich) is a rambunctious duck who is Peanut's other best friend. He can occasionally be seen in a bad mood and being unfriendly to his friends.
- Ootsie and Bootsie Snootie (voiced by Eddie Korbich) are wealthy fraternal twin poodles who live in a cake-themed house.
- Mayor Jeff (voiced by Bruce Bayley Johnson) is an otter and the mayor of Lake Hoohaw.
- Cap'n Crane (voiced by Chris Phillips) is a "watchbird".
- Connie Crane (voiced by Jackie Hoffman) is Cap'n Crane's wife.

=== Supporting ===
- Anna "Aunt Nanner" Otter (voiced by Nancy Giles) is Opal's sister, Ernest's sister-in-law and PB&J's maternal aunt.
- Wanda Raccoon (voiced by Corinne Orr) is Pinch and Scootch's mother and Walter's wife.
- Walter Raccoon (voiced by Chris Phillips) is Pinch and Scootch's father and Wanda's husband.
- Shirley Duck (voiced by Corinne Orr) is Flick's mother.
- Betty-Lou Beaver (voiced by Corinne Orr) is Munchy's mother.
- Edouard Snootie (voiced by Eddie Korbich) is Ootsie and Bootsie's father, and the wealthiest man in Lake Hoohaw.
- Georgina Snootie (voiced by Corinne Orr) is Ootsie and Bootsie's mother.
- Bubbles (voiced by Chris Phillips) is the Otters' pet bass. While he has a fish bowl in the Otters' home, the bowl has a passageway that provides him access to the lake. Bubbles originally belonged to Ootsie and Bootsie until they lost interest in him and gave him to the Otter family.
- Redolfo (voiced by Doug Preis) is a Spanish-accented, muscular otter who is Aunt Nanner's boyfriend and later husband, Opal's brother-in-law and PB&J's uncle.
