= Ted May =

American television director (1949–2020)

Ted May (May 12, 1949 – March 10, 2020) was an American television director, known for PBS children’s television series Sesame Street.

== Career ==
Positions held include:

- Director on Sesame Street Visits the Firehouse (1990), Sesame Songs Home Video: Rock and Roll (1990), Between the Lions (2000), TV Funhouse (2000), Elmo's World: The Wild Wild West (2001), Crank Yankers (2002), Zoe's Dance Moves (2003), Elmo's World: What Makes You Happy? (2007), Ready for School (2007), and Sesame Street (2005 - 2007)
- Associate Director on 3-2-1 Contact

May has been nominated for twelve Daytime Emmy awards in the category Outstanding Directing in a Children's Series, for his work on Sesame Street. He was nominated from 1995 to 2008, and won six times in 1995, 1998, 2002, 2004, 2005, and 2007. His first DE win was shared with Jon Stone, Lisa Simon, and Emily Squires.
