= Emily Squires =

American television producer and director (1941–2012)

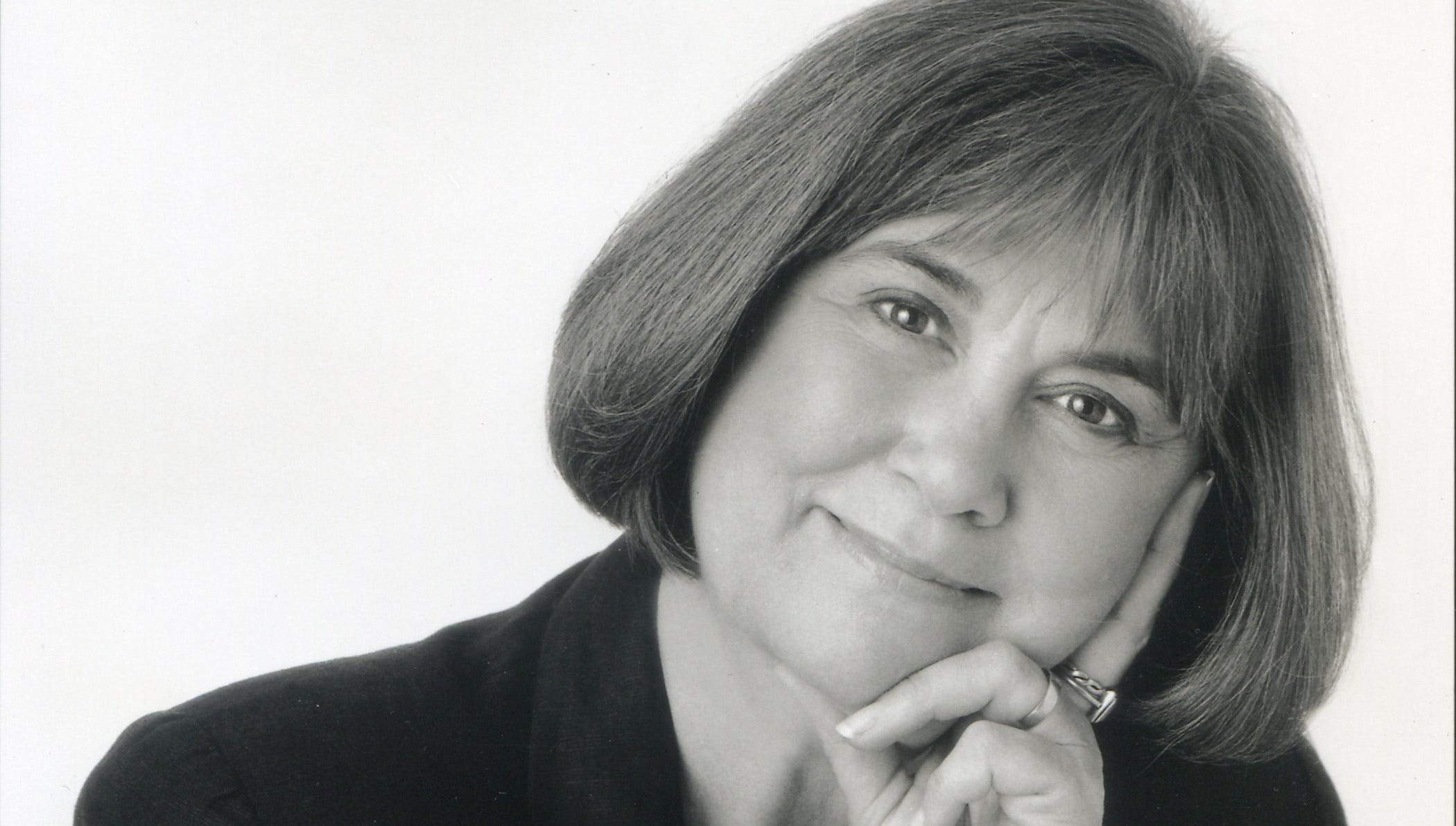
- Born: Emily Hull Squires; August 23, 1941; Alexandria, Va.
- Died: November 21, 2012 (aged 71)
- Education: Randolph Macon Woman's College; University of North Carolina
- Occupations: Television producer; television director
- Years active: 1969–2012

Emily Squires (born Emily Hull Squires August 23, 1941 – November 21, 2012) was an American television producer and director best known for her Emmy Award-winning work on Sesame Street.

== Life and career ==
After attending Randolph-Macon Woman's College, from which she later received an award as an outstanding alumna, Emily Squires graduated from the University of North Carolina in 1962. She moved to New York later that year and began working for CBS News. In 1967, when public television was in its infancy, she began working for the Public Broadcast Laboratory. Two years later, she began working as a production assistant at Sesame Street during its first year on the air.

In 1982, Squires joined a team of Sesame Street directors that included Jon Stone, Lisa Simon, and Ted May. Over the next 25 years, she received 18 Emmy nominations and became known for having a terrific eye when it came to shooting musical numbers.

In addition to becoming the first woman director of Sesame Street, Squires helped break other barriers as well. "She wanted to work on the show because it was making changes in racial stereotypes in America," Sonia Manzano, who played Maria on the show, told The New York Times.

Squires co-produced "Sesame Street's" 25th anniversary special show, "All-Star 25th Birthday: Stars and Streets Forever!"

Squires also wrote for daytime television serials including Guiding Light, Secret Storm, Search for Tomorrow, and As the World Turns, and worked on interfaith cable TV series and documentaries on the Dalai Lama, Frederick Franck, and Hiroshima. With her husband Len Belzer, Squires co-authored the book Spiritual Places in New York City.

== Positions held ==
- Scriptwriter of Guiding Light, Search for Tomorrow, The Secret Storm and As the World Turns.
- Co-producer on Sesame Street's All-Star 25th Birthday: Stars and Street Forever!; 1994
- Stage Manager on Sesame Street and Christmas Eve on Sesame Street
- Director on A Walking Tour of Sesame Street, Big Bird's Birthday or Let Me Eat Cake, Sing-Along Earth Songs|Sesame Songs Home Video: Sing-Along Earth Songs, My Sesame Street Home Video: The Best of Elmo, Elmo Saves Christmas, Big Bag, Sesame Street: A is for Asthma, Elmo's Musical Adventure and Visions of Perfect Worlds.

== Awards and nominations ==
Squires won six daytime Emmy Awards for her directing Sesame Street. She also wrote and directed Between the Lions, another PBS series, and was nominated for three Writers Guild of America awards in the Daytime Serials category for her work on Guiding Light and Search for Tomorrow. She won one of two nominations in 1985 and was again nominated in 1986.

She received an Emmy Award in 1994, in the category Outstanding Children's program, for All-Star 25th Birthday: Stars and Streets Forever!

She has also been nominated for fifteen Daytime Emmys, in the categories Outstanding Writing in a Drama Series, Outstanding Drama Series Writing Team, and Outstanding Directing in a Children's series, for her work on Guiding Light, As the World Turns, Sesame Street, and Between the Lions.

Squires died on November 21, 2012, aged 71.
