= Allegra's Window =

American children's television series

- Genre: Children's; Musical; Puppetry
- Created by: Jan Fleming-Candler; John Hoffman; Jim Jinkins
- Voices of: Kathryn Mullen; Anthony Asbury; Martin P. Robinson; Bob Stillman; Pam Arciero; Joanne Baum; Tim Lagasse; Andrea Frierson
- Composers: Don Sebesky & Dan Sawyer
- Country of origin: United States
- Original language: English
- No. of seasons: 3
- No. of episodes: 50

Production
- Executive producers: David Campbell; Jan Fleming-Candler; Jim Jinkins
- Producer: John Hoffman
- Production locations: Nickelodeon Studios; Universal Studios; Orlando, Florida
- Camera setup: Single-camera
- Running time: 24 minutes
- Production companies: Topstone Productions; Jumbo Pictures

Original release
- Network: Nick Jr.
- Release: October 24, 1994 – December 8, 1996

Allegra's Window is an American musical children's television series that aired on Nickelodeon during its Nick Jr. block from October 24, 1994, to December 8, 1996, with reruns being shown until February 5, 1999; it was later shown on Noggin from February 2, 1999, to April 6, 2003. The series deals with the daily life of a precocious, imaginative puppet character named Allegra, and features live actors, puppets and animation, similar to Sesame Street. The show was created by Jan Fleming, John Hoffman and Jim Jinkins, the latter of whom also created Doug. Two of the puppeteers, Kathryn Mullen and Anthony Asbury, would later work together on the PBS series Between the Lions as the performers of Lionel and Leona Lion.

The series also spawned a series of music videos that aired during interstitials on Nick Jr.

In the 2010s, the first season was released on iTunes and Amazon Video. On March 5, 2015, the whole series was released for viewing on Noggin's paid-subscription service from its initial launch.

== Synopsis ==
The series follows Allegra through the daily triumphs, trials, and tribulations of being a little girl. She and her big brother Rondo, along with her best friend Lindi (a yellow dog), a pesky blue neighborhood cat named Riff and a green boy named Poco all try to learn about the world around them with the help of their neighborhood friends. At the end of each episode, Allegra sits at her window and reflects on all the lessons she has learned. The series was music-based and included musically inspired characters named Lindi, Rondo, Riff, Poco, Reed, Miss Melody, Ellington, Encora, Sonata, Clef, Woofer, Aria, Tweeter, Flugie, Vi, and of course, Allegra the title character's name herself. There were also segments that feature talking musical instruments that live on the wall of Reed's Music shop.

Over 100 original songs were created for the series, under the oversight of musical director Don Sebesky.

The original decision to use the name Allegra for the show's lead character occurred after creator/executive producer Jan Fleming attended a dinner party at the house of London-based academics and was introduced to their youngest daughter, Allegra. That evening, she remarked that it would be a great name for the little girl at the center of the project she was working on.

== Characters ==
- Allegra (performed by Kathryn Mullen) is the title character of the series, a 3-year-old girl. She is just learning about the world outside of her home and is quite brave. She mostly encounters problems and always relies on her friends to find a solution. She is also known for having curly doodle hair, which Rondo points out and hates the fact that he does. She is also the leader of the gang.
- Rondo (performed by Anthony Asbury) is the older brother of Allegra. He is 6 years old and often tries to act tough. Nevertheless, he has a great deal of love and protection for his younger sister. It is mentioned that he is in the first grade by Allegra. In some episodes, Rondo walks upside down with his shoes on up.
- Lindi (performed by Pam Arciero) is a yellow dog who is Allegra's best friend and lives with Reed. She is feisty and often acts as her voice of reason in many cases throughout the series. She loves playing in the mud and also enjoys dance, especially ballet.
- Riff (voiced by Martin P. Robinson) is the pesky and grumpy neighborhood blue cat and Rondo's best friend and also a big brother type to him. Although he frequently takes advantage of Allegra's naivety, his favorite target is Mr. Cook. He becomes nicer as the series progresses.
- Mr. Cook (performed by Tim Lagasse) (credited as Timothy Lagasse) is the town baker who is frequently the butt of Riff's antics. He is generally upbeat and always speaks in third person and also speaks broken English. Rather than saying their names, he usually refers to the other characters based on their personality and appearance.
- Poco (voiced by Anthony Asbury) is Mr. Cook's nephew. The funniest and most curious character of the show, he tells jokes and teams up with Allegra, Rondo, Lindi, and Riff. Like his uncle, he also speaks in third person. He is the youngest character, being only 2 1/2 years old. Poco appears in the second and third seasons of the show.
- Reed (played by Bob Stillman) is a musician who runs the town's music shop. He is also Lindi's master. In the first season, he was depicted as being easily forgetful.
- Miss Melody (played by Andrea Frierson) is a teacher who runs Little Blue Daycare and favors Allegra.
- Ellington (played by Harry Burney) is the oldest resident of Hummingbird Alley. He is very kind and gentle to everyone in town, especially towards the kids. He appears in the first season only.
- Encora (played by Joanne Baum) is a friendly and energetic mail carrier with a love for singing. She rides a bicycle which she calls her "recycle cycle". She was introduced at the beginning of the second season.
- Sonata (performed by Pam Arciero) is Allegra and Rondo's mother.
- Clef (performed by Martin P. Robinson) is Allegra and Rondo's father.
- Grandma (performed by Heather Asch) is Allegra and Rondo's grandmother and Sonata's mother.
- Woofer (performed by Anthony Asbury), Aria (performed by Heather Asch), and Tweeter (performed by Tim Lagasse) are three tiny hummingbirds who live in a nest above a tree in Reed's piano garden.
- Flugie (performed by Martin P. Robinson) and Vi (performed by Heather Asch) are a tuba and a viola who hang on a wall at Reed's music shop.
- Jingle (performed by Heather Asch) and Jazz (performed by Tim Lagasse) are two toy balls who are often played with by Rondo and Allegra.
- Steve is an Australian green tree frog who is Allegra and Rondo's pet. He appears in the second season only.
- Arnold is an insect who is the pet of the three hummingbirds.

== Production ==
Allegra's Window was taped at Nickelodeon Studios in Orlando at Universal Studios Florida, and was produced by Topstone Productions and Jumbo Pictures.

== Episodes ==
=== Series overview ===
Season	Episodes	Originally released	
Season	Episodes	First released	Last released
1	18	October 24, 1994	December 21, 1994
2	22	September 10, 1995	October 28, 1996
3	10	September 8, 1996	December 8, 1996

=== Season 1 (1994) ===
No. overall	No. in season	Title	Directed by	Written by	Original release date
1	1	"My First Day at Daycare"	Emily Squires	Barry Harman	October 24, 1994
Allegra is very nervous about attending her first day of daycare. Accompanied by family and friends, she enters into a new world which at first seems overwhelming. Under the careful guidance of her teacher, Ms. Melody, Allegra learns to take things at her own pace, as well as the most important tool for making friends--saying "hello"!
2	2	"Where's Godfrey?"	Emily Squires	Mollie Fermaglich	October 25, 1994
When Allegra loses "Godfrey the Octopus", her favorite stuffed toy, she is devastated. Everyone in Hummingbird Alley helps to look for Godfrey, and the concern and understanding her friends demonstrate helps Allegra to deal with her loss.
3	3	"My Own Monster"	Emily Squires	Jeff Kindley	October 26, 1994
Allegra and Lindi are frightened when Rondo and Riff pretend that scary monsters lurk inside the boys' new fort. At daycare, the girls learn monsters are not only imaginary--but can also be fun! And a good laugh is had when the girls learn that the boys can be scared of monsters, too.
4	4	"Small Is Beautiful"	Emily Squires	Susan Kim	October 27, 1994
Allegra feels terribly frustrated--she's always being told she's "too little". She can't play with her brother Rondo's toys or assist Mr. Cook in his diner. But she learns that small is sometimes the best size to be when working in tandem with Reed she is "instrumental" in providing the finishing touch to his new Tinga Linga Wind Chimes in the Piano Garden.
5	5	"The Imaginary Zoo"	Emily Squires	Story by : Joe Bailey; Teleplay by : Joe Bailey and Barry Harman, Donna Harman & Jeff Kindley	November 1, 1994
Rondo goes on a class trip to the zoo, and Allegra and her friends long to go with him. At daycare, Ms. Melody takes them on a different type of "field trip"...by helping them to create their own, imaginary zoo. Even reluctant Riff joins in the fun, when he gets the chance to play his favorite relative--the lion!
6	6	"The Zootabaga Caper"	Ted May	Donna Harman	November 2, 1994
Allegra enjoys discovering new things at daycare, until she's asked to sample a new food--fresh blue zootabagas! She stubbornly resists--any new food, she hasn't tried has to be yucky! When she finally agrees to take a bite...she learns that you can't always tell a zootabaga by its cover.
7	7	"Secret Adventures"	Ted May	Tim Grundmann	November 7, 1994
Allegra inadvertently slips up and reveals a big secret Lindi shared with her. Lindi is furious; the plan to surprise Riff with a newly refurbished guitar is ruined. After Reed explains the importance of keeping one's promise, Allegra proves she is trustworthy. Lindi gives her another chance, tells her a second secret, and Allegra demonstrates she really can keep a confidence.
8	8	"Lots of Turkey Pox"	Ted May	Ian James	November 8, 1994
When Allegra awakens with a case of turkey pox, she fears she will miss out on all the fun at daycare. But with the help of her faithful pal Lindi and her dad, she finds she can join the day's activity from her bedside. Lindi provides the instructions, Dad provides materials, and Allegra learns she can still have a great time...even with the Turkey Pox.
9	9	"Don't Touch My Stuff!"	Ted May	Andrew Yerkes	November 10, 1994
Allegra accidentally damages her brother's new prized toy, Robo-Bug Boy, after being warned not to touch it. Rondo gets very upset with her, he pretends that she has become invisible, and Allegra fears he will stop being her brother! Both of them learn "brothers and sisters are forever". Not only can toys be repaired--so can hurt feelings.
10	10	"The Big Concert"	Ted May	Pippin Parker	November 11, 1994
Allegra is excited about singing backup in Rondo and Riff's big musical concert...until she realizes there is going to be a big audience. Reed shares his own experiences of "stage fright" with her. In the end, it is Allegra who saves the day singing her lead when Rondo and Riff get a bad case of the hiccups during the performance.
11	11	"Puppy Power to the Rescue"	Emily Squires	Andrea Toney & David Toney	November 14, 1994
Allegra and her friends love playing at being superheroes. But one day, Lindi almost starts believing she has the super powers of her favorite comic book heroine "Power Puppy" and determines she will find Mr. Cook's missing oven timer. In the end, Lindi realizes she is not endowed with "super powers" but is terrific just the way she is.
12	12	"When is Reed Coming Home?"	Emily Squires	Story by : Doug Cordell; Teleplay by : Jeff Kindley	November 16, 1994
Reed is going on a trip, and Allegra worries when and if he will return? Reed tries to case the separation by teaching all the children a song to sing when they feel lonely. Even so, Riff becomes convinced Reed will never come back. He and the rest are comforted when various surprises Reed has planned in his absence are revealed.
13	13	"Bandages R Us!"	Emily Squires	Mollie Fermaglich	November 29, 1994
Lindi hurts her paw, and Allegra not wanting for friend to feel alone while she recuperates, is determined to wear a bandage as well. This pleases Lindi but totally confuses Riff, who can't understand why Allegra wears a bandage when she isn't hurt. Allegra keeps to her decision to wear her bandage, even getting the entire daycare class to make one-handed finger painted get-well cards for Lindi.
14	14	"Read Me a Story"	Emily Squires	Jeff Kindley	December 1, 1994
Allegra is impressed when Rondo proudly reads a story to her, and is determined to being learning the skill herself. She takes the first step at daycare, when Ms. Melody involves the class in "writing" a book...made up of pictures, which Allegra learns is another way to tell a story. Happy with the new skills she has acquired, she proudly "reads" the book aloud to her very impressed friends.
15	15	"Allegra Has a Bad Day"	Emily Squires	Susan Kim	December 5, 1994
Awakening late, seeing a cloudy sky, and then knocking a drum over at Reed's workshop, Allegra is having a bad day. At daycare, the day gets worse: she discovers she's forgotten her lunch! But the day turns into a fun one when a sudden shower brings a much needed watering to Ellington's garden. Sometimes, the worst days can turn out the best!
16	16	"Nothing to Do"	Jim Jinkins	Susan Kim	December 7, 1994
Riff's gone catfishing, and Rondo can't find anyone to do magic tricks with. Everyone else on Hummingbird Alley is going to Allegra's tea party. Convinced that tea parties are "uncool", Rondo declines Allegra's invitation, until Allegra asks him to show her guests one of his magic tricks. Presto Chango--Rondo is the hit of the party.
17	17	"Time Out"	Jim Jinkins	Barry Harman	December 9, 1994
Playing at the breakfast table, Allegra and Rondo disobey their mother and break a family rule about not standing on chairs. This earns them both a time out. Upstairs, thinking about what he did wrong, Rondo leads Allegra in a protest against rules. But when he catches Allegra climbing on top of her dresser, Rondo realizes that some of mom and dad's rules aren't as dumb as he thought.
18	18	"Waiting for Grandma"	Jim Jinkins	Donna Harman	December 21, 1994
Grandma is coming and it's time for the Holiday Happy Hoopla. Allegra and Rondo can't wait. Mom tells them that staying busy will make the time go faster. Allegra struggles at first, but eventually she gets so involved in playing dress up that she doesn't realize when Grandma finally arrives.

=== Season 2 (1995–1996) ===
No. overall	No. in season	Title	Directed by	Written by	Original release date
19	1	"Kids That Go Bump in the Night"	Ted May	Story by : Ellen Schecter; Teleplay by : Jeff Kindley	September 10, 1995
Allegra and Rondo have a sleepover with their friends.
20	2	"A Frog Named Steve"	Ted May	Jeff Kindley	September 11, 1995
Allegra sees a frog and names it Steve. She takes care of it for a week.
21	3	"Here's Poco"	Ted May	Barry Harman	September 12, 1995
Allegra helps Poco, who is new at daycare.
22	4	"Mr. Cook Babysits"	Ted May	Andrew Yerkes	September 13, 1995
Mr. Cook babysits the kids while Allegra and Rondo's parents are away.
23	5	"A Box Divided"	Ted May	Donna Harman	September 17, 1995
Encora helps the children play with a box.
24	6	"Doodlehead"	Ted May	Story by : Jan Fleming-Candler; Teleplay by : Susan Kim	September 18, 1995
Allegra is tired of her doodly hair.
25	7	"Best Friends Forever"	Emily Squires	Andrew Yerkes	September 20, 1995
Allegra feels like three's a crowd.
26	8	"The Big Mystery"	Ted May	Susan Kim	September 24, 1995
Allegra must find out who stole her prized possessions.
27	9	"Copy Cat, Copy Cat, Go Away!"	Ted May	Jeff Kindley	September 26, 1995
Allegra imitates Rondo.
28	10	"The Wishing Stone"	Franklin Melton	Donna Harman	October 2, 1995
Allegra finds a magic stone and wishes for things.
29	11	"Poco's 2 1/2 Birthday"	Emily Squires	Story by : Scott Fellows; Teleplay by : Barry Harman & Andrew Yerkes	October 5, 1995
Poco is celebrating his birthday. However, Poco did not invite Riff, who thought the idea of a half-birthday was silly.
30	12	"Beautiful Dreamers"	Emily Squires	Jeff Kindley	October 8, 1995
Allegra and the kids discuss about their dreams.
31	13	"Topsy Turvy Day"	Ted May	Donna Harman	October 11, 1995
Everything is mixed up as it is Topsy Turvy Day.
32	14	"Stop Making Sense"	Emily Squires	Susan Kim	October 15, 1995
Rondo has the flu, so Allegra cheers him up.
33	15	"Strange Vet Fellows"	Greg Lehane	Mollie Fermaglich	October 17, 1995
Allegra goes to the doctor for a checkup.
34	16	"Clean-up Kids"	Greg Lehane	Jeff Kindley	October 24, 1995
The kids clean up by making a fun game to do the job.
35	17	"Mitten Weather"	Emily Squires	Susan Kim	November 12, 1995
Everyone is preparing for the Falling Leaf Festival.
36	18	"Quacky Quack"	Ted May	Jeff Kindley	September 29, 1996
Allegra imitates one of her favorite storybook characters, a duck named Quacky Quack.
37	19	"Spring is Here!"	Emily Squires	Susan Kim	October 6, 1996
It is spring and the kids go on a scavenger hunt.
38	20	"Play It Again, Allegra"	Ted May	Jeff Kindley	October 15, 1996
Allegra wants to be great at the piano during her lessons.
39	21	"Brother for Sale"	Ted May	Story by : John Hoffman; Teleplay by : Andrew Yerkes	October 21, 1996
After arguing with Rondo, Allegra doesn't want Rondo anymore as a brother.
40	22	"I Made It Myself"	Franklin Melton	Jeff Kindley	October 28, 1996
Riff and Rondo make a telephone out of a string and cups all by themselves.

=== Season 3 (1996) ===
No. overall	No. in season	Title	Directed by	Written by	Original release date
41	1	"Have Your Cakes"	Emily Squires	Jeff Kindley	September 8, 1996
Grandma could be late for Allegra's 4th birthday party.
42	2	"Pony, No Baloney"	Emily Squires	Paulette Licitra	September 9, 1996
Allegra believes she saw a pony, but everyone doubts her.
43	3	"Bubble Trouble"	Emily Squires	Matt Callaway	September 10, 1996
Allegra convinces Lindi that baths are fun.
44	4	"A Hero's Tail"	Steven Feldman	Story by : Ellen Schecter; Teleplay by : Susan Kim & Ellen Schecter	September 11, 1996
Allegra helps Riff out with an embarrassing situation.
45	5	"Nest Sweet Nest"	Emily Squires	Jeff Kindley	September 12, 1996
Allegra helps a baby hummingbird after it fell out of its nest.
46	6	"Sticky Situation"	Emily Squires	Carin Greenberg Baker	September 15, 1996
Allegra is stuck in her bedroom, literally!
47	7	"A Tangled Web"	Steven Feldman	Susan Kim	September 17, 1996
Allegra loses her mother's sparkling ring.
48	8	"Fun House"	Steven Feldman	Eric Weiner	September 23, 1996
On a rainy day, Allegra and her pals decide to make a fun house.
49	9	"Make It Special"	Emily Squires	Jeff Kindley	September 25, 1996
Allegra helps clean up Rondo's old bike.
50	10	"Mr. Cook's Christmas"	Emily Squires	Jeff Kindley	December 8, 1996
Mr. Cook celebrates Christmas and makes preparations.

== VHS releases ==
=== Sony Wonder ===
All of these titles were re-released on October 15, 1996 by Paramount Home Video.

- Allegra's Window: Small Is Beautiful (Released on July 25, 1995)
- Allegra's Window: Waiting for Grandma (Released on August 29, 1995)
- Allegra's Window: Storytime Sing-Along (Released on March 26, 1996)

=== Paramount Home Video ===
- Allegra's Window: Allegra's Christmas (Released on October 15, 1996)
- Allegra's Window: Play Along with Allegra and Friends (Released on May 13, 1997)
- Allegra's Window: Sing Along with Allegra & Lindi (Released on April 7, 1998)

== See also ==
- Sesame Street
- Big Bag
- Bear in the Big Blue House
- Between the Lions
- Barney & Friends
- Eureeka's Castle
