= Jim Jinkins =

American animator

- Born: Richmond, Virginia, U.S.
- Education: Lipscomb University
- Occupations: Animator; writer; television producer; director; cartoonist; author
- Years active: 1977–present
- Known for: Doug (1991–1994, 1996–1999); Allegra's Window (1994–1996); PB&J Otter (1998–2000); Stanley (2001–2004); JoJo's Circus (2003–2007); Pinky Dinky Doo (2006–2010)
- Spouse: Lisa Jinkins
- Children: 2

Signature
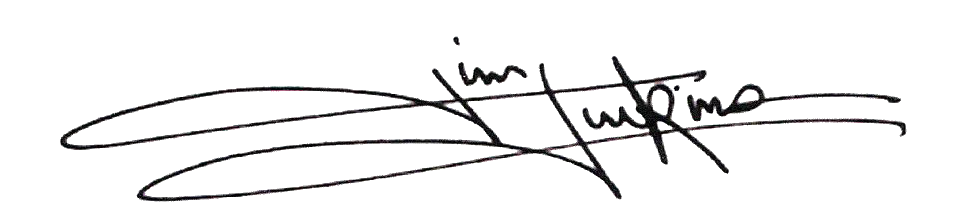

James Jinkins is an American animator, cartoonist, and children's author. He is best known as the creator of the animated television series Doug, which was later the basis for a feature film. Jinkins also created PB&J Otter, as well as several other shows produced by his two companies, Jumbo Pictures and Cartoon Pizza.

== Background and career ==
Jinkins was born in Richmond, Virginia, and lived there during his childhood. His experiences growing up in Richmond would serve as an inspiration for the fictional town of Bluffington, Virginia, in the series Doug. Jinkins was also an actor on the children's series Pinwheel and Hocus Focus and a graphic designer on By the Way and Video Comics, all of which were produced for the fledgling Nickelodeon network. After his first tenure with Nickelodeon, he went to work for Children's Television Workshop (now Sesame Workshop), becoming the graphics director for their show Square One Television.

Later, Jinkins worked in advertising, creating television commercials and promotions featuring a young boy and a dog, who would become the main characters of his major creation, Doug. A character resembling Doug appeared in grapefruit juice commercials sponsored by Florida Grapefruit Growers. Jinkins had developed Doug Funnie through doodles during the early days of his career. Doug and his dog Porkchop first appeared in Jinkins' book Doug Got a New Pair of Shoes, which led to his creating an animated pilot titled Doug Can't Dance. He sold the Doug pilot to Nickelodeon. The pilot tested higher than any other pilot for the network at the time. Jinkins established Jumbo Pictures in 1990 to produce Doug for Nickelodeon. Doug went on to become one of Nickelodeon's most popular and successful series. Jinkins also served as executive producer and voice director for Doug as well as writing only two episodes. Jinkins also created a TV show for the Nick Jr. block, Allegra's Window.

The success of Doug was later noticed by Disney executives. In 1996, Jinkins sold Jumbo Pictures to Disney, who then re-developed the series as part of their weekly One Saturday Morning lineup. At the same time, Jinkins and his team at Jumbo Pictures produced PB&J Otter, 101 Dalmatians: The Series and the feature film Doug's 1st Movie for Disney. Jinkins also founded an independent company, Cartoon Pizza, which produced shows such as JoJo's Circus, Stanley, and Pinky Dinky Doo.

As of 2017, Jinkins was living in Brunswick, Georgia, where he ran a workshop. As of 2019 he and his wife live in western North Carolina, and volunteer regularly in their community.

== Jinkins on Doug ==
Doug is not a powerful character. He is more where I feel that kids are today. They are softspoken and bewildered. But they often make the right decisions. What we tried to get across was that you should feel good about yourself and not give in to peer pressure. The underlying foundation was that doing the right thing will pay off.
