= Pinky Dinky Doo =

American animated children's TV series (2006–2009)

- The show's title with characters (Clockwise from bottom-right: Pinky Dinky Doo, Mr. Guinea Pig, Tyler Dinky Doo, Daddy Dinky Doo, and Mommy Dinky Doo)
- Genre: Animated series Adventure
- Created by: Jim Jinkins
- Developed by: Jim Jinkins; Mark York
- Voices of: India Ennenga; Allison Wachtfogel; Justin Riordan; Heather Dilly; Jim Jinkins; Felix Chrome
- Theme music composer: Joey Levine; Taylor McLam
- Opening theme: "Pinky Dinky Doo Theme Song"
- Ending theme: "We're Going to the Story Box" (Instrumental)
- Composer: Dan Sawyer
- Countries of origin: United States; Canada; Latin America (Note: Pinky Dinky Doo was an international co-production. Cartoon Pizza, Sesame Workshop, Noggin, and Abrams Gentile were based in the United States; CBC and Keyframe Digital were based in Canada; Discovery Kids was based in Latin America.; and CBeebies was based in the United Kingdom)
- Original language: English
- No. of seasons: 2
- No. of episodes: 52 (104 segments) (list of episodes)

Production
- Executive producers: David Ray Campbell; Jim Jinkins
- Producers: Melanie Grisanti; Clint Green
- Running time: 22 minutes (11 minutes per segment)
- Production companies: Sesame Workshop; Cartoon Pizza; Abrams-Gentile Entertainment (Season 2); Keyframe Digital Productions (Season 2)

Original release
- Network: CBC Television (Canada); Discovery Kids (Latin America); Noggin/Nick Jr. Channel (United States); CBeebies (United Kingdom)
- Release: April 10, 2006 – September 18, 2009

Pinky Dinky Doo is an American animated children's television series created by Jim Jinkins. It was produced and co-owned by Jinkins' Cartoon Pizza and Sesame Workshop. The series was produced in association with Discovery Kids Latin America, the Canadian Broadcasting Corporation, Noggin and CBeebies. For the second season, Abrams-Gentile Entertainment and the Canadian studio Keyframe Digital Productions joined as production companies. Each episode follows an imaginative pink-haired girl named Pinky Dinky Doo, her younger brother Tyler, and their pet, Mr. Guinea Pig, as she makes up her own stories.

== Premise ==
Pinky Dinky Doo is a young girl who lives in Great Big City with her parents, her little brother Tyler, and their house pet Mr. Guinea Pig. She loves to write stories, especially for Tyler.

Each episode begins with Tyler having a problem, such as not being able to find his shoes or not wanting to take a bath. At that point, Pinky says, "That gives me an idea." Tyler asks, "Pinky, are you going to make up a story?" and Pinky responds, "Yes-a-rooney, positooney!" (which means "Yes, positively!"), dancing to a cardboard box called the Story Box. Using chalk and her imagination, she tells a story. In the second season, whenever the Story Box is unavailable, Pinky uses the Story Pad, a notebook in which she draws pictures using a pencil to accompany her stories.

Each story features Pinky herself as the main character, with the plot centered around Tyler's primary issue. Because they are made-up stories, there tend to be unusual or silly things that occur, something that Tyler typically points out, although Pinky reminds him that anything can happen in a made-up story.

At the climax of each story, a problem starts to arise, prompting Pinky to "Think Big." During this moment, her head inflates to the size of a large balloon as she sings, "If I have a problem, don't know which way to go, I think and think and think and think... and suddenly I know!" when nearby characters encourage her with cheers of "Come on Pink, think!", Pinky begins to fly around the area, her head rapidly deflating until it returns to its normal size. At that point, she quickly devises an often wacky solution to the problem.

Some episodes feature different variations of the "Think Big" sequence:

- In Big Blob of Talk, Pinky had to "Listen Big" instead, which led to her ears swelling up, in addition to her head.
- In Burpzilla and Super Doo and Traffic Too, Pinky (as Super Duper Doo) had to "concentrate" instead, although it served the same purpose as thinking big.
- In Back to School Is Cool, Pinky's hair swells instead of her entire head due to her having a bad hair day.
- In Tyler to the Rescue, Two Wheel Dreams, Go to Bed, Tyler!, and Tyler's Big Idea, Tyler thinks big instead of Pinky.
- In Shrinky Pinky, Mr. Guinea Pig thinks big instead of Pinky.

After each story, Tyler solves his problem and knows what to do.

Each episode features a "Great Big Fancy Word" that is used throughout the story. Before a character speaks it, Mr. Guinea Pig, in most instances, blows his trumpet. At the end of each episode, Pinky and Tyler invite viewers to play a series of games on their cheese sandwich handheld, which typically quizzes the audience on what happened in the story. After the "Game Time" segment is over, Pinky ends every episode by saying, "I love to make up stories. I'll bet you can make up a story, too."

== Characters ==
=== Dinky Doo family ===
- Pinky Dinky Doo (voiced by India Ennenga)
- Tyler Dinky Doo (voiced by Felix Chrome in season 1 and Allison Wachtfogel in season 2)
- Mr. Guinea Pig (voiced by Joshua L. Berg in early season 1, Lloyd Floyd most of season 1 and Eddie Korbich in season 2)
- Mommy Dinky Doo (voiced by Heather Dilly in season 1 and Lindsie Van Winkle in season 2)
- Daddy Dinky Doo (voiced by Jim Jinkins)

=== Friendly characters ===
- Nicholas Biscuit (voiced by Justin Riordan in season 1 and Katherine Rose Riley in season 2)
- Bobby Boom (voiced by Kalif Jenkins in season 1 and Ralph Peavy in season 2)
- Daffinee Toilette (voiced by Carolina Hernandez in season 1 and Anabelle Berrido in season 2)

== Episodes ==
Season	Episodes	Originally released	
Season	Episodes	First released	Last released
1	52	April 10, 2006	March 29, 2007
2	52	September 7, 2008	September 18, 2009

== Description ==
The show is intended to help preschool-aged viewers increase their vocabularies with its Great Big Fancy Word, which is featured several times during the episode. It also addresses problem-solving skills. The interactive games featured at the end of each episode often detail the basics of narrative stories—character, dialogue, plot, details, main idea, and sequence of events.

According to the show's website, it is intended to promote reading and imaginative storytelling.

== History ==
=== Origins ===
The character of Pinky Dinky Doo was created in 2000 by Jim Jinkins as a bedtime story for his then four-year-old daughter. In an interview with Animation Magazine, he admitted, "It wasn't pre-meditated as a kid's show." In 2002, Jinkins worked with Sesame Workshop to create two web-based pilot episodes starring Pinky, which were released online in 2003. From 2003 to 2004, Random House published a series of six children's books centered around Pinky. Jim Jinkins said of his work with Sesame Workshop: "The Workshop was a beautiful partner ... they didn't overhaul it, but saw it as a natural literacy project."

=== Production ===
The series was created and produced by Cartoon Pizza and Sesame Workshop, which co-own the copyright to the series. These two companies were the sole producers of the show's pilot episodes. Jim Jinkins and David Campbell served as executive producers.

For the first season, Discovery Kids, the Canadian Broadcasting Corporation, Noggin and CBeebies all joined as co-producers. Abrams Gentile Entertainment and Keyframe Digital Productions joined as production companies in the second season. Abrams Gentile Entertainment financed part of the season in exchange for licensing and merchandising rights, and Keyframe animated the season. The intro sequence for both seasons, as well as episodes from the first season, used flash animation via Macromedia Flash, while episodes from the second season switched over to computer animation via 3DS Max, with the characters being animated via a 3D rig as opposed to being completely 3-Dimensional.

Pinky Dinky Doo was an international co-production. Cartoon Pizza, Sesame Workshop, Noggin, and Abrams Gentile were based in the United States; CBC and Keyframe Digital were based in Canada; Discovery Kids was based in Latin America; and CBeebies was based in the United Kingdom. For season 2, the budget was approximately $200,000 Canadian dollars per episode.

=== Broadcast ===
==== Internationally ====
Pinky Dinky Doo made its worldwide premiere on January 2, 2006 on CBC Television. Other Canadian networks that aired Pinky Dinky Doo include TVOntario and Knowledge Network, as well as TFO in French Canada. In most other territories, Sesame Workshop aimed to premiere the show in the first quarter of 2006. In Latin America, the show premiered on Discovery Kids on March 27, 2006.

Before the series premiere, Kidscreen announced that broadcast rights for Pinky Dinky Doo had been sold to ABC Television in Australia. It was also announced that Sesame Workshop was "focusing on securing German and French [broadcast] partners," which became Super RTL in Germany and France 5. Pinky Dinky Doo was sold to over 35 international broadcasters. The American Forces Network, a channel operated by the U.S. Armed Forces, aired Pinky Dinky Doo from 2006 to 2016.

In the United Kingdom, the show was broadcast on the BBC's children's network CBeebies from 2006 to 2012. It was redubbed and broadcast with British English voices, although the series was put on hiatus between December 31, 2006, and May 28, 2007. In Brazil, TV Cultura aired a Brazilian Portuguese dub. The series also aired on Rai Yoyo in Italian, Baraem in Arabic, and Hop! Channel in Hebrew (Hop! Channel being available exclusively in Israel).

==== United States ====
On April 10, 2006, the show made its US debut on Noggin, with the first episode also being simulcast on its sister network Nickelodeon via its Nick Jr. block. The show continued to air on Noggin's replacement, the Nick Jr. Channel until April 8, 2011.

The Spanish-language network Univision aired Spanish dubs of the show as part of its Saturday-morning Planeta U block, from its launch on April 5, 2008, to September 3, 2011.

HBO Kids later aired the series in reruns as part of HBO's partnership with Sesame Workshop, from January 17, 2016, until January 2, 2021. The show was made available on the HBO Max streaming service upon its launch on May 27, 2020, and remained available until January 2, 2021.

Until November 2022, the series was available to stream on Sensical, a free streaming service by Common Sense Media.

== Reception ==
Pinky Dinky Doo received favorable reviews from critics and audiences.

Larisa Wiseman of Common Sense Media rated the series four stars out of five, calling it "enlightening as well as silly, funny, and entertaining." She also said that the animation is "simple, colorful, and imaginative, combining photography with pictures that look as if they were drawn and colored in (rather skillfully) by a child." Entertainment Weekly's Eileen Clarke gave the show a grade of 'A,' saying it "embraces storytelling and revs up the imagination—so it certainly pays to think Pink for a while." She also noted that the show's teaching is "unlike Dora; the repetition involved in the lessons is barely noticeable."
