= List of children's animated television series of the 2000s =

This is a list of animated television series (including Internet television series) originally targeted towards audiences aged 12 and under.

This list does not include Japanese, Chinese or Korean series, as children's animation is much more common in these regions.

== 2000s ==
=== United States ===
Title	Genre	Seasons/episodes	Show creator(s)	Original release	Network	Studio	Age rating	Technique
The Weekenders	Comedy	4 seasons, 39 episodes	Doug Langdale	February 26, 2000 – February 29, 2004	ABC (Disney's One Saturday Morning, seasons 1–2); UPN (Disney's One Too, season 3); Toon Disney (season 4)	Walt Disney Television Animation	TV-Y7	Traditional
Between the Lions	Adventure; Comedy; Fantasy; Musical; Puppetry	10 seasons, 130 episodes	Lou Berger; Christopher Cerf; Michael K. Frith; Kathryn Mullen; Linda Rath; Norman Stiles	April 3, 2000 – November 22, 2010	PBS Kids	WGBH-TV; Mississippi Public Broadcasting; Sirius Thinking, Ltd.	TV-Y	Traditional/Flash/CGI/Live-action
The Bob Clampett Show	Anthology	2 seasons, 26 episodes		May 21, 2000 – March 11, 2001	Cartoon Network		—N/a	Traditional
Buzz Lightyear of Star Command	Adventure; Science fiction Comedy; Superhero	2 seasons, 65 episodes	Mark McCorkle; Bob Schooley	August 8, 2000 – January 13, 2001	UPN; ABC	Walt Disney Television Animation; Pixar	TV-Y7	Traditional
Dora the Explorer	Preschool children's adventure	8 seasons, 177 episodes	Chris Gifford; Valerie Walsh Valdes; Eric Weiner	August 14, 2000 – August 9, 2019	Nickelodeon	Nickelodeon Animation Studio	TV-Y	Traditional
Generation O!		1 season, 13 episodes	David Hale; Tim Newman; James Proimos; Suzanne Collins	August 26, 2000 – March 23, 2001	Kids' WB	Sunbow Productions; RTV Family Entertainment; Cuckoo's Nest Animation	TV-Y	Traditional
Clifford the Big Red Dog	Comedy; Educational	2 seasons, 65 episodes	Deborah Forte	September 4, 2000 – February 25, 2003	PBS Kids	Scholastic Productions; Mike Young Productions	TV-Y	Traditional
Teacher's Pet	Animated sitcom Farce	4 seasons, 39 episodes	Gary Baseman; Bill Steinkellner; Cheri Stienkellener	September 9, 2000 – May 10, 2002	ABC (2000–02); Toon Disney (2002)	Walt Disney Television Animation	TV-Y7	Traditional
Static Shock	Adventure; Comic science fiction Superhero	4 seasons, 52 episodes	—N/a	September 23, 2000 – May 22, 2004	Kids' WB	DC Comics; Warner Bros. Animation	TV-Y7	Traditional
As Told by Ginger	Comedy-drama	3 seasons, 60 episodes	Emily Kapnek	October 25, 2000 – November 14, 2006	Nickelodeon (2000–04); Nicktoons Network (2004–06)	Klasky Csupo; Nickelodeon Animation Studio	TV-Y7	Traditional
X-Men Evolution	Action; Science fiction Superhero	4 seasons, 52 episodes	Marty Isenberg; Robert N. Skir; David Wise	November 4, 2000 – October 25, 2003	Kids' WB	Film Roman; Marvel Studios	TV-Y7	Traditional
3-2-1 Penguins!	Sci-fi	3 seasons, 27 episodes	Jeff Parker; Nathan Carlson; Phil Lollar	November 14, 2000 – November 13, 2008	Direct-to-video (season 1) qubo (seasons 2–3)	Big Idea Entertainment; Cornerstone Animation (2002–03)	TV-Y	CGI
Sheep in the Big City	Comedy	2 seasons, 26 episodes	Mo Willems	November 17, 2000 – April 7, 2002	Cartoon Network	Curious Pictures	TV-Y7	Traditional
House of Mouse	Anthology	3 seasons, 52 episodes	Roberts Gannaway; Tony Craig	January 13, 2001 – October 24, 2003	ABC (Disney's One Saturday Morning, 2001–02); Toon Disney (2002–03)	Walt Disney Television Animation	TV-Y7	Traditional
The Zeta Project	Action; Adventure; Science fiction	2 seasons, 26 episodes	Robert Goodman	January 27, 2001 – August 10, 2002	Kids' WB	DC Comics; Warner Bros. Animation	TV-Y7	Traditional
Lloyd in Space	Comic science fiction	4 seasons, 39 episodes	Joe Ansolabehere; Paul Germain	February 3, 2001 – February 27, 2004	ABC (2001–02); Toon Disney (2002–04)	Walt Disney Television Animation; Paul & Joe Productions; Plus One Animation	TV-Y7	Traditional
The Fairly OddParents	Comedy	10 seasons, 172 episodes	Butch Hartman	March 30, 2001 – July 26, 2017	Nickelodeon (2001–16); Nicktoons (2017)	Frederator Studios; Nickelodeon Animation Studio; Billionfold Inc. (seasons 5–10)	TV-Y7	Traditional (seasons 1–10a)/Flash (season 10b)
Invader Zim	Science fiction Dark comedy	2 seasons, 27 episodes	Jhonen Vasquez	March 30, 2001 – August 19, 2006	Nickelodeon (2001–02); Nicktoons Network (2006)	Wumberlog Productions (pilot); Nickelodeon Animation Studio	TV-Y7	Traditional
Time Squad	Comic science fiction	2 seasons, 26 episodes	Dave Wasson	June 8, 2001 – November 26, 2003	Cartoon Network	Cartoon Network Studios	TV-Y7	Traditional
Samurai Jack	Action-adventure; Comedy-drama; Apocalyptic dystopian Science fantasy	4 seasons, 52 episodes	Genndy Tartakovsky	August 10, 2001 – September 25, 2004	Cartoon Network	Cartoon Network Studios; Cartoon Network Productions	TV-Y7	Traditional
Grim & Evil	Comic science fiction	3 seasons, 26 episodes	Maxwell Atoms	August 24, 2001 – October 31, 2003	Cartoon Network	Cartoon Network Studios	TV-Y7	Traditional
The Legend of Tarzan	Action/adventure; Adventure; Comedy	2 seasons, 39 episodes	Walt Disney Television	September 3, 2001 – February 5, 2003	UPN	Walt Disney Television Animation	TV-Y	Traditional
Stanley	Educational	3 seasons, 65 episodes	Andrew Griffin	September 15, 2001 – November 26, 2004	Playhouse Disney	Cartoon Pizza	TV-Y	Traditional
The Mummy	Action; Adventure; Supernatural fiction Horror fiction Mystery fiction	2 seasons, 26 episodes	Stephen Sommers	September 29, 2001 – June 7, 2003	Kids' WB	Universal Cartoon Studios; The Sommers Company; Rough Draft Studios; Sunwoo Entertainment	TV-Y7	Traditional
Mary-Kate and Ashley in Action!	Action/adventure; Children's television series	26 episodes	Robin Riordan	October 20, 2001 – June 29, 2002	ABC	Dualstar Animation; DIC Entertainment, L.P.	TV-Y7	Traditional
Justice League	Superhero; Action; Adventure; Science fiction	2 seasons, 52 episodes	Bruce Timm	November 17, 2001 – May 29, 2004	Cartoon Network	Warner Bros. Animation; DC Comics	TV-Y7	Traditional
The Popeye Show	Anthology	4 seasons, 45 episodes	—N/a	November 19, 2001 – July 20, 2003	Cartoon Network		—N/a	Traditional
Action League Now!	Superhero; Action; Comedy	1 season, 12 episodes	Robert Mittenthal; Will McRobb; Albie Hecht	November 25, 2001 – February 10, 2002	Nickelodeon	Chuckimation; Flying Mallet, Inc.	TV-Y7	Stop-motion/Live-action
Harold and the Purple Crayon	Animation	1 season, 13 episodes	Carin Greenberg; Jeff Kline	December 1, 2001 – March 23, 2003	HBO Family	Columbia TriStar Television; Adelaide Productions	TV-Y	Traditional
Teamo Supremo	Superhero; Comedy; Science fiction	3 seasons, 76 episodes	Phil Walsh	ABC run: January 19, 2002 – May 31, 2003; Toon Disney run: August 25, 2002 – August 17, 2004	ABC; Toon Disney	Walt Disney Television Animation	TV-Y	Traditional
ChalkZone	Comedy; Fantasy; Action-adventure	4 seasons, 40 episodes	Bill Burnett; Larry Huber	March 22, 2002 – August 23, 2008	Nickelodeon	Nickelodeon Animation Studio; Frederator Studios	TV-Y	Traditional
Phantom Investigators	Fantasy; Mystery; Horror	1 season, 13 episodes	Stephen Holman; Josephine T. Huang	May 25, 2002 – June 29, 2002	Kids' WB	Columbia TriStar Domestic Television (W)holesome Productions; Adelaide Productions	TV-Y7	Stop-motion
Kim Possible	Comedy; Action; Adventure	4 seasons, 87 episodes	Bob Schooley; Mark McCorkle	June 7, 2002 – September 7, 2007	Disney Channel	Walt Disney Television Animation	TV-G	Traditional
Whatever Happened to... Robot Jones?	Comedy	2 seasons, 13 episodes	Greg Miller	July 19, 2002 – November 14, 2003	Cartoon Network	Hanna-Barbera (pilot); Cartoon Network Studios	TV-Y7	Traditional
The Adventures of Jimmy Neutron: Boy Genius	Comedy; Science fiction Action/Adventure	3 seasons, 61 episodes	Keith Alcorn; John A. Davis	July 20, 2002 – November 25, 2006	Nickelodeon	O Entertainment; DNA Productions; Nickelodeon Animation Studio	TV-Y7	CGI
¡Mucha Lucha!	Action; Adventure; Comedy; Fantasy; Sports	3 seasons, 52 episodes	Eddie Mort; Lili Chin	August 17, 2002 – February 26, 2005	Kids' WB	Fwak! Animation; Warner Bros. Animation	TV-Y7	Flash
Liberty's Kids	Historical fiction	1 season, 40 episodes	Kevin O'Donnell; Michael Maliani	September 2, 2002 – April 4, 2003	PBS Kids	DIC Entertainment; Melusine Productions	TV-Y7	Traditional
Baby Looney Tunes	Comedy	4 seasons, 53 episodes		September 7, 2002 – April 20, 2005	Kids' WB; Cartoon Network	Warner Bros. Animation	TV-Y	Traditional
What's New, Scooby-Doo?	Action; Adventure; Comic science fiction Horror; Mystery; Science fantasy	3 seasons, 42 episodes		September 14, 2002 – July 21, 2006	Kids' WB	Warner Bros. Animation	TV-G	Traditional
Ozzy & Drix	Action; Adventure; Science fiction	2 seasons, 26 episodes		September 14, 2002 – July 5, 2004	Kids' WB	Conundrum Entertainment; Warner Bros. Animation	TV-Y7	Traditional
Fillmore!	Action; Comedy	2 seasons, 26 episodes	Scott M. Gimple	September 14, 2002 – January 30, 2004	ABC (2002–04); Disney Channel (2003); Toon Disney (2004)	Walt Disney Television Animation	TV-Y7	Traditional
Codename: Kids Next Door	Comedy; Fantasy; Espionage; Action/Adventure	6 seasons, 78 episodes	Mr. Warburton	December 6, 2002 – January 21, 2008	Cartoon Network	Curious Pictures; Hanna-Barbera (Kenny and the Chimp short only); Cartoon Network Studios	TV-Y7	Traditional
I Spy	Animation	2 seasons, 52 episodes	Jean Marzollo; Walter Wick	December 14, 2002 – September 21, 2003	HBO Family	The Ink Tank (2002–03); JWL Entertainment Productions (2003); Scholastic Media (2002–03)	TV-Y	Stop-motion
Teenage Mutant Ninja Turtles (2003)	Action/Adventure; Science fantasy	7 seasons, 156 episodes		February 8, 2003 – February 28, 2009	Fox (2003–09); The CW (season 7)	Mirage Studios; Dong Woo Animation; 4Kids Entertainment	TV-Y7	Traditional
Stuart Little	Animation	1 season, 13 episodes	E. B. White	March 1 – May 24, 2003	HBO Family	Red Wagon Entertainment; Sony Pictures Television; Wang Film Productions; Adelaide Productions	TV-Y7	Traditional
Strawberry Shortcake	Educational	4 seasons, 22 episodes	Those Characters From Cleveland; American Greetings	March 11, 2003 – September 11, 2008	Direct-to-video	American Greetings; DIC Entertainment Corporation	TV-Y	Traditional
All Grown Up!	Comedy	5 seasons, 55 episodes	Arlene Klasky; Gábor Csupó; Paul Germain	April 12, 2003 – August 17, 2008	Nickelodeon	Klasky Csupo; Nickelodeon Animation Studio	TV-Y7	Traditional
The Grim Adventures of Billy & Mandy	Black comedy Comedy horror Animation; Slapstick	6 seasons, 84 episodes	Maxwell Atoms	June 13, 2003 – November 9, 2007	Cartoon Network	Cartoon Network Studios; Hanna-Barbera (pilot only)	TV-Y7	Traditional
Evil Con Carne	Comic science fiction	2 seasons, 35 episodes	Maxwell Atoms	July 11, 2003 – October 22, 2004	Cartoon Network	Cartoon Network Studios	TV-Y7	Traditional
Teen Titans	Superhero; Action; Adventure	5 seasons, 65 episodes	Glen Murakami; Sam Register	July 19, 2003 – September 15, 2006	Cartoon Network	Warner Bros. Animation; DC Comics (season 5)	TV-Y7	Traditional
My Life as a Teenage Robot	Comedy; Action-adventure; Comic science fiction Science fantasy Superhero; Science fiction	3 seasons, 39 episodes	Rob Renzetti	August 1, 2003 – May 2, 2009	Nickelodeon (2003–05); Nicktoons Network (2008–09)	Frederator Studios; Nickelodeon Animation Studio	TV-Y7	Traditional
Duck Dodgers	Comic science fiction	3 seasons, 39 episodes		August 23, 2003 – November 11, 2005	Cartoon Network	Warner Bros. Animation	TV-Y7	Traditional
Clifford's Puppy Days	Comedy; Educational	2 seasons, 65 episodes	Susan Meddaugh	September 1, 2003 – February 23, 2006	PBS Kids	Scholastic Productions; Mike Young Productions (season 1)	TV-Y	Traditional
Lilo & Stitch: The Series	Comedy; Adventure; Science fiction	2 seasons, 65 episodes	Chris Sanders; Dean DeBlois	September 20, 2003 – July 29, 2006	Disney Channel	Walt Disney Television Animation	TV-G	Traditional
Generation Jets		1 season, 13 episodes		October 4, 2003 – January 31, 2004	WCBS-TV	BTrain Films	—N/a	Flash/Traditional
Kenny the Shark	Comedy	2 seasons, 26 episodes	Jack Huber	November 1, 2003 – February 19, 2005	Discovery Kids	Phase 4	TV-Y7	Traditional
Tutenstein	Action; Adventure; Science fantasy Horror	3 seasons, 39 episodes	Jay Stephens	November 1, 2003 – October 11, 2008	Discovery Kids	PorchLight Entertainment	TV-Y7	Traditional
Xiaolin Showdown	Action; Adventure; Science fiction	3 seasons, 52 episodes	Christy Hui	November 1, 2003 – May 13, 2006	Kids' WB	Warner Bros. Animation	TV-Y7	Traditional
Star Wars: Clone Wars	Military science fiction Action/Adventure	3 seasons, 25 episodes	Genndy Tartakovsky	November 7, 2003 – March 25, 2005	Cartoon Network	Cartoon Network Studios; Lucasfilm	TV-Y7	Traditional
Dave the Barbarian	Adventure; Comedy; Fantasy	1 season, 21 episodes	Doug Langdale	January 23, 2004 – January 22, 2005	Disney Channel	Walt Disney Television Animation	TV-Y7	Traditional
Danny Phantom	Action; Adventure; Comedy; Fantasy; Sci fi	3 seasons, 53 episodes	Butch Hartman	April 3, 2004 – August 24, 2007	Nickelodeon	Billionfold Inc. Nickelodeon Animation Studio	TV-Y7	Traditional
Megas XLR	Comic science fiction	2 seasons, 26 episodes	Jody Schaeffer; George Krstic	May 1, 2004 – January 15, 2005	Cartoon Network	Cartoon Network Studios	TV-Y7	Traditional
Justice League Unlimited	Superhero; Action; Adventure; Science fiction	3 seasons, 39 episodes		July 31, 2004 – May 13, 2006	Cartoon Network	Warner Bros. Animation; DC Comics (2005–2006)	TV-Y7	Traditional
Foster's Home for Imaginary Friends	Fantasy; Comedy; Adventure	6 seasons, 79 episodes	Craig McCracken	August 13, 2004 – May 3, 2009	Cartoon Network	Cartoon Network Studios	TV-Y7	Flash
Brandy & Mr. Whiskers	Adventure; Surreal comedy	2 seasons, 39 episodes	Russell Marcus	August 21, 2004 – August 25, 2006	Disney Channel	Walt Disney Television Animation	TV-Y7	Flash/Traditional
The Batman	Action; Adventure; Mystery; Superhero	5 seasons, 65 episodes		September 11, 2004 – March 8, 2008	Cartoon Network (seasons 1–2); Kids' WB	Warner Bros. Animation; DC Comics (seasons 3–5)	TV-Y7	Traditional
Higglytown Heroes	Educational	3 seasons, 65 episodes	George Evelyn; Holly Huckins; Denis Morella; Kent Redeker; Jeff Ulin	September 12, 2004 – January 7, 2008	Playhouse Disney	WildBrain Entertainment; Happy Nest Company	TV-Y	CGI
Super Robot Monkey Team Hyperforce Go!	Action; Adventure; Comedy drama Mecha; Science fiction Superhero; Tech noir	4 seasons, 52 episodes	Ciro Nieli	September 18, 2004 – December 16, 2006	Jetix (Toon Disney)	Jetix Animation Concepts	TV-Y7	Traditional
Maya & Miguel	Comedy; Educational	1 season, 65 episodes	Deborah Forte	October 11, 2004 – October 10, 2007	PBS Kids Go!	Scholastic Studios	TV-Y	Traditional
Cartoon Alley	Anthology	3 seasons, 47 episodes	Ben Mankiewicz	November 5, 2004 – March 1, 2007	Turner Classic Movies	—N/a	TV-G	Traditional
Hi Hi Puffy AmiYumi	Comedy; Musical	3 seasons, 39 episodes	Sam Register	November 19, 2004 – June 27, 2006	Cartoon Network	Cartoon Network Studios; Renegade Animation	TV-Y7	Flash
Auto-B-Good	Educational	2 seasons, 63 episodes		January 17, 2005 – February 27, 2006	Syndication	Wet Cement Productions; GoldKing Media	TV-Y	CGI
American Dragon: Jake Long	Action; Adventure; Comedy; Fantasy; Superhero	2 seasons, 52 episodes	Jeff Goode	January 21, 2005 – September 1, 2007	Disney Channel	Walt Disney Television Animation	TV-Y7	Traditional
Avatar: The Last Airbender	Action; Adventure; Fantasy; Comedy-drama	3 seasons, 61 episodes	Michael Dante DiMartino; Bryan Konietzko	February 21, 2005 – July 19, 2008	Nickelodeon	Nickelodeon Animation Studio	TV-Y7	Traditional
Krypto the Superdog	Superhero; Comedy	2 seasons, 39 episodes	Alan Burnett; Paul Dini	March 25, 2005 – December 15, 2006	Cartoon Network	Warner Bros. Animation; DC Comics	TV-Y7	Traditional
Classical Baby	Animation	1 season, 13 episodes	Amy Schatz	May 14, 2005	HBO Family	HBO	—N/a	Traditional
The Life and Times of Juniper Lee	Action; Adventure; Comedy; Fantasy; Sci Fi	3 seasons, 40 episodes	Judd Winick	May 30, 2005 – December 15, 2006	Cartoon Network	Cartoon Network Studios	TV-Y7	Traditional
The Buzz on Maggie	Comedy	1 season, 21 episodes	Dave Polsky	June 17, 2005 – May 27, 2006	Disney Channel	Walt Disney Television Animation	TV-Y7	Flash
Camp Lazlo	Comedy	5 seasons, 61 episodes	Joe Murray	July 8, 2005 – March 27, 2008	Cartoon Network	Cartoon Network Studios; Rough Draft Studios; Joe Murray Productions	TV-Y7	Traditional
Catscratch	Comedy	1 season, 20 episodes	Doug TenNapel	July 9, 2005 – February 10, 2007	Nickelodeon	Nickelodeon Animation Studio	TV-Y7	Traditional
Firehouse Tales	Adventure; Comedy		Sidney J. Bailey	August 22, 2005 – May 7, 2006	Cartoon Network	Warner Bros. Animation	TV-Y	Traditional
Ribert and Robert's Wonderworld		4 seasons, 78 episodes	Mike DeVitto	September 4, 2005 – November 30, 2008	PBS Kids		—N/a	CGI/Live-action
Danger Rangers		1 season, 16 episodes	Christopher West; Walter Douglas Smith Jr. Michael D. Moore	September 5, 2005 – December 26, 2006	PBS Kids	Educational Adventures; Animation Works Inc.	TV-Y7	Traditional
The Zula Patrol	Science fiction	3 seasons, 52 episodes	Deb Manchester	September 5, 2005 – June 18, 2008	PBS Kids	Kambooteron Productions; Gotham Entertainment; The Hatchery	TV-Y	CGI
Go, Diego, Go!	Preschool; Adventure	5 seasons, 80 episodes	Chris Gifford	September 6, 2005 – September 16, 2011	Nickelodeon	Nickelodeon Animation Studio	TV-Y	Traditional
Bratz	Adventure; Comedy	2 seasons, 40 episodes	Peggy Nicoll	September 10, 2005 – February 26, 2008	Fox (2005–06); Cartoon Network (2008)	Mike Young Productions; MGA Entertainment	TV-Y7	CGI
Loonatics Unleashed	Action; Adventure; Science fiction Superhero	2 seasons, 26 episodes		September 17, 2005 – May 5, 2007	Kids' WB	Warner Bros. Animation	TV-Y7	Traditional
Trollz	Adventure; Comedy; Fantasy; Magical girl	1 season, 27 episodes	Andy Heyward	October 3 – November 8, 2005	CBS	Thomas Dam; DIC Entertainment	TV-Y7	Traditional
Little Einsteins	Children's television series Educational; Adventure; Musical	2 seasons, 67 episodes	Douglas Wood	October 9, 2005 – December 22, 2009	Playhouse Disney	The Baby Einstein Company; Curious Pictures	TV-Y	Flash
The X's	Action; Adventure; Comic science fiction	1 season, 20 episodes (1 unaired)	Carlos Ramos	November 25, 2005 – November 25, 2006	Nickelodeon	Nickelodeon Animation Studio	TV-Y7	Traditional
My Gym Partner's a Monkey	Adventure; Comedy	4 seasons, 56 episodes	Julie McNally Cahill; Tim Cahill	December 26, 2005 – November 27, 2008	Cartoon Network	Cartoon Network Studios; Saerom Animation	TV-Y7	Flash/Traditional
Ben 10 (2005)	Action; Adventure; Science fantasy Superhero	4 seasons, 52 episodes	Man of Action Entertainment	December 27, 2005 – April 15, 2008	Cartoon Network	Cartoon Network Studios	TV-Y7	Traditional
The Emperor's New School	Comedy	2 seasons, 52 episodes	Mark Dindal	January 27, 2006 – November 20, 2008	Disney Channel	Walt Disney Television Animation	TV-Y7	Traditional
Kappa Mikey	Comedy	2 seasons, 52 episodes	Larry Schwarz	February 25, 2006 – September 20, 2008	Nicktoons Network	Animation Collective; Kanonen & Bestreichen, Inc.	TV-Y7	Flash
Wonder Pets!	Adventure; Educational; Musical	3 seasons, 62 episodes	Josh Selig	March 3, 2006 – March 9, 2016	Nickelodeon; Nick Jr. Channel	Little Airplane Productions; Nickelodeon Animation Studio	TV-Y	Flash
Mickey Mouse Clubhouse	Children's television series Educational	4 seasons, 125 episodes	Bobs Gannaway	May 5, 2006 – November 6, 2016	Playhouse Disney (2006–11); Disney Junior (2011–16)	Disney Television Animation	TV-Y	CGI
Squirrel Boy	Comedy	2 seasons, 26 episodes	Everett Peck	May 27, 2006 – September 27, 2007	Cartoon Network	Cartoon Network Studios	TV-Y7	Traditional
Fetch! with Ruff Ruffman	Game show Reality	5 seasons, 100 episodes	Kate Taylor	May 29, 2006 – November 4, 2010	PBS Kids Go!	WGBH-TV	TV-Y	Flash/Live-action
The Replacements	Action-adventure; Comedy; Fantasy; Sci-fi	2 seasons, 52 episodes	Mark Dindal	July 28, 2006 – March 30, 2009	Disney Channel	Disney Television Animation	TV-Y7	Traditional
Shorty McShorts' Shorts	Anthology; Comedy	2 seasons, 13 episodes	Barry Blumberg; John Solomon	July 28, 2006 – May 25, 2007	Disney Channel	Disney Television Animation	TV-Y7	Flash
Wow! Wow! Wubbzy!	Preschool; Children's television series	2 seasons, 52 episodes	Bob Boyle	August 21, 2006 – February 21, 2010	Nickelodeon	Bolder Media; Starz Media	TV-Y	Flash
Biker Mice from Mars (2006)	Action; Adventure; Science fiction	2 seasons, 52 episodes	Rick Ungar	August 26, 2006 – July 14, 2007	4Kids TV	Criterion Licensing; Brentwood Television Funnies	TV-Y7	Traditional
Yin Yang Yo!	Action; Science fiction Comedy; Martial arts Fantasy	2 seasons, 65 episodes	Bob Boyle	August 26, 2006 – April 18, 2009	Jetix (Toon Disney) (2006–08); Disney XD (2009)	Jetix Animation Concepts	TV-Y7	Flash
Curious George (2006)	Comedy	15 seasons, 198 episodes		September 4, 2006 – March 17, 2022	PBS Kids; Peacock	Universal Animation Studios; Imagine Entertainment (seasons 1–9); WGBH Boston; Universal 1440 Entertainment (seasons 10–15)	TV-Y	Traditional (seasons 1-11); Flash (seasons 12-15)
Horseland	Fantasy	3 seasons, 39 episodes	Andy Heyward	September 16, 2006 – December 6, 2008	CBS	Horseland, LLC; KOL; DIC Entertainment	TV-Y7	Traditional
Tom and Jerry Tales	Comedy	2 seasons, 26 episodes		September 23, 2006 – March 22, 2008	Kids' WB	Warner Bros. Animation	TV-Y7	Traditional
Shaggy & Scooby-Doo Get a Clue!	Comedy; Adventure	2 seasons, 26 episodes		September 23, 2006 – March 15, 2008	Kids' WB	Warner Bros. Animation	TV-Y7	Traditional
Legion of Super Heroes	Superhero; Adventure	2 seasons, 26 episodes		September 23, 2006 – April 5, 2008	Kids' WB	Warner Bros. Animation; DC Comics	TV-Y7	Traditional
Class of 3000	Comedy; Musical	2 seasons, 27 episodes	André 3000; Thomas W. Lynch	November 3, 2006 – May 25, 2008	Cartoon Network	Moxie Turtle; Tom Lynch Company; Cartoon Network Studios	TV-Y7	Flash/Traditional
Ellen's Acres		1 season, 26 episodes	Larry Schwarz	January 8, 2007 – February 5, 2007	Cartoon Network	Animation Collective	TV-Y	Flash
The Land Before Time	Adventure	1 season, 26 episodes	Charles Grosvenor; Judy Freudberg; Tony Geiss	March 5, 2007 – January 21, 2008	Cartoon Network	Universal Animation Studios; Amblin Entertainment	TV-Y7	Traditional
My Friends Tigger & Pooh	Educational	3 seasons, 63 episodes	A. A. Milne (characters); Bobs Gannaway	May 12, 2007 – October 9, 2010	Playhouse Disney	Walt Disney Television Animation; Polygon Pictures	TV-Y	CGI
Phineas and Ferb	Surreal comedy Musical	5 seasons, 157 episodes	Dan Povenmire; Jeff "Swampy" Marsh	August 17, 2007 – present	Disney Channel; Disney XD; Disney+ (2025–present)	Disney Television Animation	TV-G	Traditional
Yo Gabba Gabba!	Children's television series Musical; Educational	4 seasons, 66 episodes	Christian Jacobs; Scott Schultz	August 20, 2007 – November 12, 2015	Nickelodeon	The Magic Store; Wildbrain Entertainment	TV-Y	Flash/Live Action/CGI/Stop motion
Tak and the Power of Juju	Adventure; Comedy; Fantasy	1 season, 26 episodes	Avalanche Software	August 31, 2007 – January 24, 2009	Nickelodeon	THQ; Avalanche Software; Nickelodeon Animation Studio	TV-Y7	CGI
WordGirl	Educational; Superhero	8 seasons, 130 episodes	Dorothea Gillim	Shorts: November 10, 2006 – Early 2007; Full series: September 3, 2007 – August 7, 2015	PBS Kids Go! (2007–13); PBS Kids (2013–15)	Soup2Nuts; Scholastic	TV-Y7	Flash
WordWorld	Educational	3 seasons, 45 episodes	Don Moody; Jacqueline Moody; Peter Schneider; Gary Friedman	September 3, 2007 – January 17, 2011	PBS Kids	The Learning Box; WTTW	TV-Y	CGI
Care Bears: Adventures in Care-a-lot	Adventure	2 seasons, 26 episodes	—N/a	September 15, 2007 – November 2, 2010	CBS; MuchMusic	American Greetings; SD Entertainment	TV-Y7	Traditional
Shorts in a Bunch	Comedy; Variety	1 season, 13 episodes	—N/a	September 23, 2007 – December 30, 2007	Nicktoons Network	—N/a	TV-Y7	Traditional/Live-action
Back at the Barnyard	Comedy	2 seasons, 52 episodes	Steve Oedekerk	September 29, 2007 – November 12, 2011	Nickelodeon (2007–10); Nicktoons (2011)	O Entertainment (2007, season 1); Omation Animation Studio (2008–11, seasons 1–2); Nickelodeon Animation Studio	TV-Y7	CGI
Chowder	Animation; Adventure; Surreal comedy Slapstick	3 seasons, 49 episodes	C. H. Greenblatt	November 2, 2007 – August 7, 2010	Cartoon Network	Cartoon Network Studios; Screen Novelties; Hong Ying Animation	TV-Y7	Traditional
DinoSquad	Action/Adventure	2 seasons, 26 episodes	Jeffrey Scott	November 3, 2007 – December 6, 2008	CBS	DIC Entertainment	TV-Y7	Traditional
Transformers: Animated	Action; Adventure; Science fantasy Superhero	3 seasons, 42 episodes	Sam Register; Matt Youngberg; Derrick J. Wyatt	December 26, 2007 – May 23, 2009	Cartoon Network	Cartoon Network Studios; Hasbro	TV-Y7	Traditional
Betsy's Kindergarten Adventures	Educational	1 season, 24 episodes	—N/a	January 19, 2008 – January 17, 2009	PBS Kids	Polkadot Productions	TV-Y	Traditional
Ni Hao, Kai-Lan	Preschool; Educational	2 seasons, 40 episodes	Karen Chau	February 7, 2008 – November 4, 2011	Nickelodeon	Harringtoons Productions; Nickelodeon Animation Studio	TV-Y	Traditional
The Spectacular Spider-Man	Action; Adventure; Superhero	2 seasons, 26 episodes		March 8, 2008 – November 18, 2009	The CW; Disney XD	Adelaide Productions; Culver Entertainment; Marvel Entertainment; Sony Pictures Television	TV-Y7	Traditional
Ben 10: Alien Force	Action; Adventure; Science fantasy Superhero	3 seasons, 46 episodes	Man of Action Entertainment	April 18, 2008 – March 26, 2010	Cartoon Network	Cartoon Network Studios	TV-Y7	Traditional
The Mighty B!	Comedy	2 seasons, 40 episodes	Amy Poehler; Cynthia True; Erik Wiese	April 26, 2008 – June 12, 2011	Nickelodeon (2008–10); Nicktoons (2010–11)	Paper Kite Productions; Polka Dot Pictures; Nickelodeon Animation Studio	TV-Y7	Traditional
The Marvelous Misadventures of Flapjack	Adventure; Surreal comedy Fantasy	3 seasons, 46 episodes	Thurop Van Orman	June 5, 2008 – August 31, 2010	Cartoon Network	Cartoon Network Studios	TV-Y7	Traditional
Can You Teach My Alligator Manners?		2 seasons, 20 episodes	Ethan Long	June 21, 2008 – November 14, 2009	Playhouse Disney	OddBot Inc.	TV-Y	Flash
Sid the Science Kid	Educational	2 seasons, 66 episodes	The Jim Henson Company	September 1, 2008 – March 25, 2013	PBS Kids	The Jim Henson Company; KCET	TV-Y	CGI
The Secret Saturdays	Action; Adventure; Fantasy	2 seasons, 36 episodes	Jay Stephens	October 3, 2008 – January 30, 2010	Cartoon Network	PorchLight Entertainment	TV-Y7	Traditional
Star Wars: The Clone Wars	Action; Adventure; Science fiction	7 seasons, 133 episodes	George Lucas	October 3, 2008 – May 4, 2020	Cartoon Network (2008–2013); Netflix (2014); Disney+ (2020)	Lucasfilm; Lucasfilm Animation	TV-PG/TV-Y7	CGI
Making Fiends	Comic science fiction Horror	1 season, 6 episodes	Amy Winfrey	October 4, 2008 – November 1, 2008	Nicktoons Network	Nickelodeon Animation Studio	TV-Y7	Flash
Cars Toons	Comedy	2 seasons, 16 episodes	John Lasseter	October 27, 2008 – May 20, 2014	Disney Channel	Walt Disney Pictures; Pixar Animation Studios (Mater's Tall Tales); Pixar Canada (Tales from Radiator Springs)	TV-Y7	CGI
Peanuts Motion Comics	Comedy	1 season, 20 episodes		November 3, 2008	iTunes	United Feature Syndicate, Inc. Charles M. Schulz Creative Associates; Warner Premiere	TV-G	Flash
Tasty Time with ZeFronk		2 seasons, 20 episodes	Ethan Long	November 8, 2008 – September 24, 2010	Playhouse Disney	OddBot Inc.	TV-Y	Flash
Batman: The Brave and the Bold	Superhero; Comedy-drama; Action; Adventure	3 seasons, 65 episodes		November 14, 2008 – November 18, 2011	Cartoon Network	Warner Bros. Animation; DC Comics	TV-Y7	Traditional
The Penguins of Madagascar	Action; Adventure; Comedy	3 seasons, 149 episodes	Tom McGrath; Eric Darnell	November 28, 2008 – December 19, 2015	Nickelodeon (2008–12); Nicktoons (2013–15)	DreamWorks Animation Television; Nickelodeon Animation Studio	TV-Y7	CGI
Random! Cartoons	Comedy; Variety	1 season, 13 episodes	Fred Seibert	December 6, 2008 – December 20, 2009	Nicktoons Network	Frederator Studios; Nickelodeon Animation Studio	TV-Y7	Traditional; CGI; Flash
The Electric Company	Educational	3 seasons, 52 episodes	Paul Dooley; Joan Ganz Cooney; Lloyd Morrisett	January 23, 2009 – April 4, 2011	PBS Kids Go!	Sesame Workshop	TV-Y7	Traditional/Stop-motion/Flash/Live-action
Wolverine and the X-Men	Action; Adventure; Drama; Science fiction Superhero	1 season, 26 episodes	Craig Kyle; Greg Johnson	January 23, 2009 – November 29, 2009	Nicktoons Network	Marvel Studios; Toonz Entertainment; First Serve International; Liberation Entertainment; EVA Finance GmbH; Marvel Entertainment	TV-Y7	Traditional
Special Agent Oso	Preschool	2 seasons, 60 episodes	Ford Riley	April 4, 2009 – May 17, 2012	Playhouse Disney (2009–11); Disney Junior (2011–12)	Disney Television Animation; Sunwoo Entertainment	TV-G	CGI
Ape Escape	Comedy	1 season, 38 episodes		July 5, 2009	Nicktoons Network	Frederator Studios; Hawaii Film Partners; Project 51 Productions; Showcase Entertainment	TV-G	CGI
The Super Hero Squad Show	Action; Adventure; Comedy; Science fantasy	2 seasons, 52 episodes	Stan Lee	September 14, 2009 – October 14, 2011	Cartoon Network	Film Roman; Ingenious Media (episodes 13–26); Marvel Animation	TV-Y7	Traditional
Fanboy & Chum Chum	Comedy	2 seasons, 52 episodes	Eric Robles	October 12, 2009 – July 12, 2014	Nickelodeon (2009–12); Nicktoons (2014)	Frederator Studios; Nickelodeon Animation Studio	TV-Y7	CGI
Have a Laugh!	Comedy; Musical	1 season, 60 episodes	—N/a	October 26, 2009 – December 2, 2012	Disney Channel	The Walt Disney Company	TV-G	Traditional

=== United Kingdom ===
Title	Genre	Seasons/episodes	Show creator(s)	Original release	Network	Studio	Technique
Fetch the Vet	Preschool; Adventure	2 seasons, 26 episodes	Gail Penston; Stephen Thraves	18 September 2000 – 23 December 2001	ITV; CITV	Cosgrove Hall Films; Flextech Television; LWT	Stop-motion
Angelina Ballerina	Preschool; Comedy	2 seasons, 20 episodes	Barbara Slade	15 October 2001 – 21 June 2003	CITV	HIT Entertainment	Traditional
Mr. Bean: The Animated Series	Comedy	4 seasons, 158 episodes	Rowan Atkinson	2 March 2002 – present	ITV; CITV; Boomerang; ITVX	Tiger Aspect Productions (Note: Series 1–3); Richard Purdum Productions (Note: Series 1); Tiger Aspect Kids & Family (Note: Series 4)	Traditional (Note: Series 1); Flash (Note: Series 2–present)
Wallace & Gromit's Cracking Contraptions	Comedy; Family	1 season, 10 episodes	Nick Park	15 October 2002	BBC One	Aardman Animations	Stop-motion
Rubbadubbers	Comedy; Fantasy; Adventure	4 seasons, 52 episodes	Peter Curtis	15 January 2003 – 3 November 2005	CBeebies; Nick Jr. Channel	HOT Animation; HiT Entertainment	Stop-motion
The Koala Brothers	Preschool; Adventure	3 seasons, 79 episodes	David Johnson	1 September 2003 – 31 October 2007	CBeebies	Famous Flying Films; Spellbound Entertainment	Stop-motion
Peppa Pig	Preschool	8 seasons, 394 episodes	Neville Astley; Mark Baker	31 May 2004 – present	Channel 5 Nick Jr. (UK)	Contender Entertainment Group (2004–2009); Entertainment One (2009–present)	Flash
Zorro: Generation Z	Action; Adventure	1 season, 26 episodes	Rick Ungar	March 16, 2006 – September 7, 2006	Pop	BKN International; BKN New Media; Zorro Productions, Inc.	Traditional
Underground Ernie	Children's television series	1 season, 26 episodes	John Deery; Sid Rainey	5 June – 23 December 2006	CBeebies	3D Films; Joella Productions	CGI
Horrid Henry	Children's television series Comedy	5 seasons, 260 episodes	Francesca Simon	October 30, 2006 – May 17, 2019	CITV; Netflix (season 5)	Novel Entertainment	Traditional (seasons 1–4); Flash (season 5)
Shaun the Sheep	Comedy; Slice of life Slapstick	7 seasons, 190 episodes	Nick Park	5 March 2007 – present	CBBC (UK); BBC One (UK); Kika (Germany); Netflix (series 6)	Aardman Animations; BBC; Westdeutscher Rundfunk	Stop-motion
Kerwhizz	Children's game show	2 seasons, 41 episodes	Tony Reed; Alan Robinson	7 November 2008 – 25 March 2011	CBeebies	BBC; Studio 100	CGI/Live action
Marvo the Wonder Chicken	Comedy; Slapstick; Fantasy; Animated sitcom	2 seasons, 51 episodes		2008 – 2010	Jetix; Disney XD	Red Kite Animation; The Dandy; Jetix Europe	Traditional
Angelina Ballerina: The Next Steps	Musical	4 seasons, 40 episodes	Katharine Holabird; Helen Craig; Mallory Lewis	5 September 2009 – 13 November 2010	Channel 5 PBS Kids	HIT Entertainment; WNET New York	CGI

=== Canada ===
Title	Genre	Seasons/episodes	Show creator(s)	Original release	Network	Studio	Technique
Maggie and the Ferocious Beast	Fantasy	3 seasons, 39 episodes	Michael Paraskevas; Betty Paraskevas	August 26, 2000 – June 9, 2002	Teletoon	Nelvana	Traditional
Yvon of the Yukon	Comedy	3 seasons, 52 episodes	Ian James Corlett; Terry Klassen	September 7, 2000 – January 24, 2004	Teletoon	Studio B Productions; Alliance Atlantis Communications; Corus Entertainment	Traditional
Eckhart		3 seasons, 39 episodes	David Weale; Kevin Gillis; Gretha Rose	September 8, 2000 – May 26, 2002	Teletoon	Cellar Door Productions; Catalyst Entertainment; Animation Services Hong Kong Limited	Traditional
What About Mimi?	Comedy; Slapstick	3 seasons, 39 episodes	Chris Bartleman; Blair Peters	October 4, 2000 – August 14, 2002	Teletoon	Decode Entertainment; Studio B Productions	Traditional
D'Myna Leagues	Comedy; Sports	2 seasons, 26 episodes	Chris Bartleman; Blair Peters	November 6, 2000 – June 28, 2004	CTV	Aston Entertainment Group; Studio B Productions; MSH Entertainment	Traditional
Anne of Green Gables: The Animated Series	Fantasy; Comedy-drama	1 season, 26 episodes	Kevin Sullivan	September 2, 2001 – March 24, 2002	PBS Kids	Sullivan Animation; Annemation Productions Inc.	Traditional
RoboRoach	Adventure; Comedy; Science fiction comedy	2 seasons, 52 episodes	J.D. Smith; Lila Rose; Carolyn Rose	January 8, 2002 – June 14, 2004	Teletoon	Portfolio Entertainment	Traditional
Max & Ruby	Children's; Preschool	7 seasons, 130 episodes	Rosemary Wells	May 3, 2002 – August 24, 2019	Treehouse TV; TFO; Ici Radio-Canada Télé	Nelvana; Silver Lining Productions (seasons 1–5); 9 Story Entertainment (seasons 3–5); Chorion (seasons 4–5); Atomic Cartoons (seasons 6–7)	Flash
Henry's World	Fantasy	2 seasons, 26 episodes	Michael McGowan	August 24, 2002 – August 6, 2004	Family Channel	Cuppa Coffee Studio; Alliance Atlantis Communications; TV-Loonland AG (season 1)	Stop-motion
Poko	Preschool	2 seasons, 52 episodes	Jeff Rosen	June 9, 2003 – May 25, 2006	CBC Television	Eraser Dog Prods. Salter Street Films; Alliance Atlantis; Halifax Film Company (season 2)	Stop-motion
Jacob Two-Two	Comedy	5 seasons, 62 episodes	—N/a	September 7, 2003 – September 3, 2006	YTV	Nelvana; Salter Street Films; 9 Story Entertainment (season 5)	Flash
The Boy	Spy-fi	2 seasons, 25 episodes	—N/a	January 1, 2004 – September 5, 2005	YTV	Tooncan Animation, Inc.	Traditional
Zixx	Sci-fi; Cyberpunk	3 seasons, 39 episodes	Jeffrey Hirschfield	January 17, 2004 – August 31, 2009	YTV	The Nightingale Company; Rainmaker Entertainment	CGI/Live-action
Miss Spider's Sunny Patch Friends	Children's television series	3 seasons, 44 episodes	David Kirk	September 7, 2004 – October 26, 2008	Teletoon	Callaway Arts & Entertainment	CGI
6teen	Sitcom; Comedy; Slice-of-life	4 seasons, 93 episodes	Jennifer Pertsch; Tom McGillis	November 7, 2004 – February 11, 2010	Teletoon (Canada); Nickelodeon; Cartoon Network (United States)	Nelvana; Fresh TV (seasons 3–4)	Flash
Mischief City	Comedy	2 seasons, 26 episodes	Peter Moss	January 4, 2005 – December 22, 2005	YTV	Mercury Filmworks; Shaftesbury Films	Flash
Being Ian	Comedy	3 seasons, 63 episodes	Ian James Corlett	April 26, 2005 – October 11, 2008	YTV	Studio B Productions; Nelvana	Flash
Carl²	Animated sitcom	4 seasons, 65 episodes	Lila Rose; Carolyn Hay; Eva Almos	August 7, 2005 – January 23, 2011	Teletoon	PiP Animation Services; Portfolio Entertainment	Flash
Delilah & Julius	Action; Adventure; Science fiction	2 seasons, 52 episodes	Suzanne Chapman; Steven JP Comeau	August 14, 2005 – August 16, 2008	Teletoon	Decode Entertainment; Collideascope Digital Productions	Flash
Class of the Titans	Urban fantasy Science fantasy Comedy drama Action; Adventure	2 seasons, 52 episodes	Chris Bartleman; Michael Lahay	December 31, 2005 – June 22, 2008	Teletoon	Studio B Productions; Nelvana Limited	Traditional
Lunar Jim	Children's adventure science fiction	2 seasons, 52 episodes	Alexander Bar	January 2, 2006 – October 19, 2007	CBC Television; BBC Kids; Ici Radio-Canada Télé	Alliance Atlantis; Halifax Film Company	Stop-motion
Yam Roll	Comedy	1 season, 39 episodes	Jono Howard; Jon Izen	February 6 – December 23, 2006	CBC Television	March Entertainment	Flash
Pinky Dinky Doo	Preschool	2 seasons, 52 episodes	Jim Jinkins	April 10, 2006 - September 18, 2009	Noggin; CBC Television	Cartoon Pizza; Sesame Workshop	Flash (season 1); CGI (season 2)
My Goldfish Is Evil!		2 seasons, 26 episodes	Nicolas J. Boisvert	September 9, 2006 – December 15, 2007	CBC Television	Sardine Productions	Traditional
Grossology	Action; Adventure; Comedy; Science fantasy	2 seasons, 52 episodes	Simon Racioppa & Richard Elliott	September 29, 2006 – October 24, 2009	YTV	Nelvana Limited; Flypaper Press	Flash
Ruby Gloom	Comedy horror	2 seasons, 40 episodes	Martin Hsu	October 13, 2006 – June 1, 2008	YTV	Nelvana	Flash
Storm Hawks	Action; Adventure; Science fantasy Dramedy	2 seasons, 52 episodes	Asaph Fipke	May 25, 2007 – April 6, 2009	YTV	Nerd Corps Entertainment	CGI
Wayside	Animated sitcom	2 seasons, 26 episodes	John Derevlany; Louis Sachar	June 25, 2007 – September 18, 2008	Teletoon	Nelvana	Traditional (season 1); Flash (season 2)
Total Drama	Comedy drama Mockumentary; Reality; Satire	6 seasons, 145 episodes	Jennifer Pertsch; Tom McGillis	July 8, 2007 – present	Teletoon (Canada); Cartoon Network (United States)	Fresh TV; Cake Entertainment; Corus Entertainment (season 6)	Flash
Ricky Sprocket: Showbiz Boy	Comedy; Animated sitcom	2 seasons, 26 episodes	David Fine; Alison Snowden	August 31, 2007 – May 4, 2009	Teletoon	Bejuba! Entertainment; SnowdenFine Animation; Studio B Productions	Flash
Bo on the Go!	Preschool; Adventure	3 seasons, 55 episodes	Michael Donovan; Jeff Rosen; Cheryl Wagner	September 3, 2007 – December 18, 2009	CBC Television	Halifax Film	CGI
Will and Dewitt	Comedy; Adventure; Musical	1 season, 26 episodes	Andrew Nicholls and Darrell Vickers	September 22, 2007 – May 3, 2008	YTV	D'Angelo-Bullock-Allen Productions; Cookie Jar Entertainment	Flash
Animal Mechanicals	Preschool; Science fiction comedy Adventure; Mecha	3 seasons, 73 episodes	Jeff Rosen	September 1, 2008 – January 26, 2011	CBC Television	Decode Entertainment; Halifax Film	CGI
Best Ed	Comedy; Slapstick	1 season, 26 episodes	Rick Marshall	October 3, 2008 – October 22, 2009	Teletoon	9 Story Media Group	Flash
Turbo Dogs	Children's television series Sports	1 season, 26 episodes	Scholastic Corporation (characters)	October 3, 2008 – May 7, 2011	Kids' CBC	CCI Entertainment	CGI
Kid vs. Kat	Science fiction Science fantasy Slapstick comedy Surreal comedy	2 seasons, 52 episodes	Rob Boutilier	October 25, 2008 – June 4, 2011	YTV	Studio B Productions	Flash
RollBots	Action; Science fiction Comedy	1 season, 26 episodes	Michael Milligan	February 7 – November 24, 2009	YTV; Radio-Canada	Amberwood Entertainment	CGI
Jimmy Two-Shoes	Slapstick; Comedy; Animated sitcom Surreal humor Urban fantasy Black comedy	2 seasons, 52 episodes	Edward Kay; Sean Scott	February 13, 2009 – July 15, 2011	Teletoon	Breakthrough Entertainment; Jetix Europe (season 1)	Toon Boom (season 1); Flash (season 2)
League of Super Evil	Action; Comedy; Slapstick	3 seasons, 52 episodes	Philippe Ivanusic-Vallée; Davila LeBlanc; Peter Ricq	March 7, 2009 – August 25, 2012	YTV	Nerd Corps Entertainment	CGI
Stoked	Sitcom; Comedy	2 seasons, 52 episodes	Jennifer Pertsch; Tom McGillis	June 25, 2009 – January 26, 2013	Teletoon (Canada); Cartoon Network (United States, season 1 only)	Fresh TV	Flash
Spliced	Adventure; Slapstick; Surreal comedy	1 season, 26 episodes	Simon Racioppa; Richard Elliott	September 19, 2009 – March 13, 2010	Jetix; Teletoon	Nelvana	Flash

=== Latin America and Brazil ===
Title	Country	Genre	Seasons/episodes	Show creator(s)	Original release	Network	Studio	Technique
Betty Toons	Colombia	Comedy	2 seasons, 60 episodes		2002 – 2003	RCN Televisión	Conexión Creativa	Traditional
Roncho, el perro mala pata	Mexico	Comedy	2 seasons, 60 episodes	Ricardo Arnaiz	2003	Locomotion	Animex Producciones, Candiani Estudios	Traditional
Villa Dulce	Chile	Comedy, Musical	2 seasons 26 episodes	Beatriz Buttazoni, Francisco Bobadilla	March 16, 2004 – December 14, 2005	UC13	Blanco Films	Flash
Anabel	Brazil	Comedy, Fantasy, Suspense	2 seasons, 26 episodes	Lancast Mota	February 28, 2005 – 2010	Nickelodeon (2005), TV Rá-Tim-Bum (2010)	Martinelli Films, Estúdio Gato Amarelo	Flash
Diego & Glot	Chile	Comedy	2 seasons, 22 episodes	Claudio Kreutzberger, Sebastián Correa, José Tomás Correa	September 3, 2005 – August 24, 2009	UC13	Cubo Negro	Traditional
Pulentos	Chile	Comedy, Musical	2 seasons, 22 episodes		September 3, 2005 – June 29, 2009	UC13	Tercer Hemisferio	CGI
Profesor Súper O	Colombia	Educational, Comedy	4 seasons, 96 episodes	Antonio Guerra, Martín de Francisco	2006 – present	Canal 13, Señal Colombia	Conexión Creativa	Traditional
El Chavo: The Animated Series	Mexico	Comedy	7 seasons, 135 episodes	Roberto Gómez Bolaños	October 21, 2006 – June 9, 2014	Canal 5	Ánima Estudios	Flash/Traditional
As Aventuras de Gui & Estopa	Brazil	Adventure, Sitcom	4 seasons, 79 episodes	Mariana Caltabiano	2008	Cartoon Network	Mariana Caltabiano	Flash
Fishtronaut	Brazil	Adventure	2 seasons, 104 episodes	Célia Catunda, Kyle Hewitt	April 20, 2009 – April 10, 2018	Discovery Kids	TV PinGuim	Flash
Fernanda	Cuba	Comedy	1 season, 20 episodes	Mario Rivas	2005 — 2012	Cubavisión	Cuban Institute of Cinematographic Art and Industry	Flash

=== France ===
Title	Genre	Seasons/episodes	Show creator(s)	Original release	Network	Studio	Technique
Doc Eureka	Education; Biography; Comedy	1 season, 39 episodes	Patrice Valli	June 20 – August 24, 2000	La Cinquième; France 3	P.M.M.P.	Traditional
Watch My Chops!	Comedy	3 seasons, 104 episodes	Stephan Franck; Emmanuel Franck	February 21, 2003 – November 18, 2016	France 3 Gulli (season 2)	Millimages	Traditional (seasons 1–2); Flash (season 3)
Code Lyoko	Action; Adventure; Science fiction Cyberpunk	4 seasons, 97 episodes	Tania Palumbo; Thomas Romain	September 3, 2003 – November 10, 2007	France 3 Canal J	Antefilms Production; MoonScoop (seasons 2–4)	CGI/Traditional
Pigeon Boy	Action; Adventure; Superhero; Comedy	1 season, 26 episodes	Jean de Loriol	January 24, 2004 – January 2, 2005	France 3	Millimages	Traditional
Rintindumb	Comedy	1 season, 76 episodes	Hugo Gittard	September 6, 2006 – 2007	France 3	Xilam; Dargaud Media; Lucky Comics	Traditional
A Kind of Magic	Fantasy; Comedy	2 seasons, 78 episodes	Michel Couion; Arthur de Pins	January 5, 2008 – February 22, 2018	France 3 / Disney Channel (season 1); Gulli / Canal J (season 2)	Xilam Animation	Flash
Wakfu	Action; Fantasy; Comedy-drama; Adventure	4 seasons, 78 episodes	Anthony Roux	October 30, 2008 – present	France 3 France 4	Ankama; France Télévisions; Frakas Productions; Pictanovo	Flash; Traditional (season 3–present)

=== Middle East ===
Title	Country	Genre	Seasons/episodes	Show creator(s)	Original release	Network	Studio	Technique
Block 13	Kuwait	Comedy; Edutainment; Slapstick; Musical	3 seasons, 45 episodes	Nawaf Salem Al-Shammari	December 12, 2000 – December 5, 2002	Kuwait Television	Al Nazaer (seasons 1-3); Farooha Media Productions (season 3)	CGI/Flash

=== Co-productions ===
Title	Genre	Seasons/episodes	Show creator(s)	Original release	Network	Studio	Technique
Fix & Foxi and Friends	Comedy	2 seasons, 52 episodes	Rolf Kauka	February 26, 2000 – February 22, 2002	KiKa (Germany); Clan TVE (Spain); ABC-TV/ABC Kids (Australia); Fix & Foxi (international)	D'Ocon Films; RTV Family Entertainment AG; Energee Entertainment (season 2)	Traditional
Jackie Chan Adventures	Comedy; Fantasy; Adventure; Action; Superhero	5 seasons, 95 episodes	John Rogers; Duane Capizzi; Jeff Kline	September 9, 2000 – July 8, 2005	Kids' WB	The JC Group; Blue Train Entertainment; Adelaide Productions; Sony Pictures Television	Traditional
Corduroy		1 season, 13 episodes	Don Freeman	September 30, 2000 – February 24, 2001	PBS Kids	Nelvana; Sichuan Top Animation	Traditional
Timothy Goes to School		2 seasons, 26 episodes	Rosemary Wells	September 30, 2000 – January 26, 2002	PBS Kids	Silver Lining Productions; Animation Services Hong Kong Limited; Nelvana	Traditional
Marvin the Tap-Dancing Horse	Fantasy	2 seasons, 26 episodes	Michael Paraskevas; Betty Paraskevas	September 30, 2000 – January 26, 2002	PBS Kids	Nelvana; Hong Guang Animation	Flash/Traditional
Seven Little Monsters	Fantasy; Comedy	3 seasons, 40 episodes	Maurice Sendak	September 30, 2000 – October 6, 2003	PBS Kids	Wild Things Productions; Nelvana Limited; Hong Ying Animation (seasons 1–2); Philippine Animation Studio Inc. (Season 3)	Traditional
George Shrinks	Fantasy; Comedy	3 seasons, 40 episodes	William Joyce	September 30, 2000 – January 23, 2003	PBS Kids	Nelvana Limited; Jade Animation	Traditional
Pelswick	Comedy	2 seasons, 26 episodes	John Callahan	October 5, 2000 – November 15, 2002	CBC (Canada); Nickelodeon (United States); CCTV (China)	Nelvana Limited; Suzhou Hong Ying Animation Company Limited	Traditional
Nick & Perry	Science fiction Comedy	2 seasons, 52 episodes	Armin Toerkell	October 25, 2000 – June 16, 2001	M6 (France); KI.KA (Germany)	Ellipsanime; EM.TV & Merchandising AG	Traditional
Horrible Histories	Comedy; Adventure	1 season, 26 episodes	Martha Atwater; Gordon Langley; Andrew Young; Charlie Stickney; Tamar Simon Hoffs	December 19, 2000 – November 14, 2001	ITV (CITV)	Scholastic Entertainment; Mike Young Productions; Telegael	Traditional
Butt-Ugly Martians	Comedy; Science fiction Action; Adventure	1 season, 26 episodes	Michael Train	February 19, 2001 – February 23, 2003	CITV	Mike Young Productions; DCDC Limited; Just Entertainment	CGI
Mummy Nanny	Adventure; Fantasy; Comedy	1 season, 26 episodes	Denis Olivieri; Claude Prothée	April 17 – May 22, 2001	Germany: Super RTL; France: France 2 and Canal J	EM.TV & Merchandising; Les Cartooneurs Associés	Traditional
Braceface	Teen drama Comedy	3 seasons, 78 episodes	Melissa Clark	June 2, 2001 – September 1, 2004	Teletoon	Nelvana Limited; Jade Animation	Traditional
What's with Andy?	Cringe comedy Physical comedy Surreal humour Slapstick; Adventure	3 seasons, 78 episodes		June 30, 2001 – March 7, 2007	Fox Kids/Jetix (international); Teletoon (Canada); Super RTL (Germany, seasons 2–3)	CinéGroupe; Saban Entertainment (season 1); SIP Animation (season 2)	Traditional
Cubix	Adventure; Action; Comic science fiction	2 seasons, 26 episodes	Cinepix	August 11, 2001 – January 24, 2004	Seoul Broadcasting System; KBS 2TV	Daewon Media; 4Kids Productions	CGI
Oswald	Educational	1 season, 26 episodes	Dan Yaccarino	August 20, 2001 – September 19, 2003	Nickelodeon	HIT Entertainment; Nickelodeon Animation Studio	Traditional
Sagwa, the Chinese Siamese Cat	Children's television series Fairy tale Adventure	1 season, 40 episodes	Amy Tan	September 3, 2001 – October 5, 2002	PBS Kids	CinéGroupe; Sesame Workshop	Traditional
Pecola		2 seasons, 26 episodes	Naomi Iwata	September 3, 2001 – September 18, 2002	Teletoon; TV Tokyo	Yomiko Advertising; Nelvana Limited; Milky Cartoon	CGI
Sitting Ducks	Comedy	2 seasons, 26 episodes	Michael Bedard	September 13, 2001 – July 5, 2003	Cartoon Network	The Krislin Company; Creative Capers Entertainment; Krislin/Elliot Digital; Sitting Ducks Productions; USA Cable Entertainment; Universal Television	CGI
The New Adventures of Lucky Luke	Western; Action-adventure; Comedy; Slapstick	1 season, 52 episodes		September 16, 2001 – May 4, 2003	France 3 Télé-Québec; Teletoon	Xilam; Lucky Comics; Tooncan Productions, Inc.	Traditional
Cartouche: Prince of the Streets	Adventure	1 season, 26 episodes	Éric-Paul Marais	October 3, 2001 – February 13, 2002	M6	Xilam; Storimages	Traditional
Totally Spies!	Spy fiction	7 seasons, 182 episodes	Vincent Chalvon-Demersay; David Michel	November 3, 2001 – present	Teletoon	Zodiak Kids & Family France; Image Entertainment Corporation (seasons 3–5); Ollenom Studio (season 7)	Traditional; Flash (season 7–present)
Cyberchase	Action; Adventure; Science fiction Educational	16 seasons, 153 episodes	Sandra Sheppard	January 21, 2002 – present	PBS Kids (2002–04; 2013–present); PBS Kids Go! (2004–13)	Nelvana (2002–07, seasons 1–5); PiP Animation Services (seasons 6–present); Title Entertainment (seasons 6–present); WNET; Flying Minds Entertainment (2005, season 4)	CGI (seasons 1–present); Traditional (seasons 1–5); Flash (season 6–present)
Tracey McBean	Adventure; Comic science fiction	3 seasons, 78 episodes		February 18, 2002 – March 29, 2006	ABC Kids	Southern Star; Shanghai Animation Studios; Egmont Imagination (season 1)	Traditional
Talis and the Thousand Tasks	Fantasy; Action; Adventure; Comedy	1 season, 52 episodes	Alexander Wieser	February 25, 2002 – September 30, 2003	France: Télétoon and France 3 Germany: KI.KA; Austria: ORF 1	Millimages; Cine Cartoon; ZDF Enterprises	Traditional
Super Duper Sumos	Comedy	1 season, 26 episodes	Kevin O'Donnell	April 7, 2002 – February 2, 2003	Nickelodeon (United States); Tooniverse (South Korea)	DIC Entertainment, L. P. Ameko Entertainment	Traditional
Pig City	Animated sitcom	3 seasons, 39 episodes	Andy Knight	April 16, 2002 – January 10, 2004	Teletoon; Fox Kids (international)	CinéGroupe; AnimaKids Productions; Red Rover Studios	Traditional
Make Way for Noddy	Comedy; Musical	2 seasons, 100 episodes	Mallory Lewis	September 2, 2002 – October 3, 2003	Channel 5 (United Kingdom); PBS Kids (United States)	Chorion; SD Entertainment	CGI
Kaput & Zösky	Science fiction Comedy	2 seasons, 26 episodes	Lewis Trondheim	September 2, 2002 – December 15, 2003	France 3 (France); Teletoon (Canada)	Futurikon; Tooncan Productions, Inc.	Traditional
The Berenstain Bears	Children's series Comedy	3 seasons, 40 episodes	Stan and Jan Berenstain	September 9, 2002 – September 12, 2003	PBS Kids (US); Treehouse TV (Canada)	Nelvana; Agogo Entertainment	Traditional
Gadget & the Gadgetinis	Comedy; Adventure	1 season, 52 episodes	Jean Chalopin	September 11, 2002 – November 29, 2003	M6 (France); Jetix (Worldwide); Channel 5 (United Kingdom)	SIP Animation; DIC Entertainment Corporation	Traditional
Yakkity Yak	Comedy; Slapstick	1 season, 26 episodes	Mark Gravas	November 9, 2002 – December 12, 2003	Teletoon (Canada); Nickelodeon (Australia)	Studio B Productions; Kapow Pictures	Flash
Jasper the Penguin	Children's series Adventure; Comedy	1 season, 52 episodes	Eckart Fingberg; Michael Mädel; Udo Beissel	March 3, 2003 – October 31, 2005	France 5 (France); KI.KA (Germany)	Millimages; Toons 'N' Tales	Traditional
Ratz	Comedy	1 season, 26 episodes	Richard Zielenkiewicz	March 7, 2003 – January 17, 2004	France: France 3 and Canal J Canada: Teletoon	Tooncan; Xilam	Traditional
Jakers! The Adventures of Piggley Winks		3 seasons, 52 episodes		September 7, 2003 – January 23, 2007	PBS Kids; CBeebies	Entara Ltd. Mike Young Productions; Crest Communications	CGI
The Hydronauts	Children's series Science fiction Adventure; Comedy	2 seasons, 26 episodes	Eckart Fingberg; Michael Mädel	September 13, 2003 – August 23, 2004	KI.KA (Germany); France 5 (France)	Toons 'N' Tales; Millimages	Traditional/CGI; Live action (France)
JoJo's Circus	Educational	3 seasons, 63 episodes	Jim Jinkins; David Campbellr; Lisa Jinkinsr; Eric Weine	September 20, 2003 – February 14, 2007	Playhouse Disney	Cuppa Coffee Studios; Cartoon Pizza	Stop-motion
Martin Mystery	Horror; Comedy; Mystery; Science fantasy Action-Adventure	3 seasons, 66 episodes	Vincent Chalvon-Demersay; David Michel	October 1, 2003 – March 27, 2006	France: M6 and Canal J Canada: YTV and Vrak	Marathon Animation; Image Entertainment Corporation; Merchandising Media GmbH (seasons 1–2)	Traditional
Potatoes and Dragons	Fantasy	2 seasons, 26 episodes	Jan Van Rijsselberge	January 5 – June 30, 2004	France: France 3 and Canal J Canada: Teletoon	Alphanim; CINAR Corporation (season 1); Cookie Jar Entertainment (season 2); DQ Entertainment; LuxAnimation; Europool	Traditional
Peep and the Big Wide World	Children's television series Educational; Comedy	5 seasons, 60 episodes	Kaj Pindal	April 12, 2004 – October 14, 2011	TVOKids (Canada); Discovery Kids/TLC (season 1–3); Public television syndication (seasons 4–5) (United States)	WGBH Boston; 9 Story Entertainment; TVOntario; Discovery Kids (seasons 1–3); Alliance Atlantis (season 1); Nelvana (seasons 2–5); Sprout (seasons 4–5); National Film Board of Canada (uncredited)	Flash
Atomic Betty	Adventure; Comic science fiction Magical girl Science fantasy Comedy	3 seasons, 79 episodes	Trevor Bentley; Mauro Casalese; Rob Davies; Olaf Miller	August 6, 2004 – January 29, 2008	Canada: Teletoon; France: M6 (seasons 1–2); Télétoon (season 3)	Atomic Cartoons; Breakthrough Entertainment; Tele Images Kids; Phil Roman Entertainment (uncredited); Marathon Media	Flash
Lazy Lucy	Children's series Comedy	1 season, 52 episodes	Eckart Fingberg; Michael Mädel; Udo Beissel	September 4, 2004 – August 25, 2005	France: France 5 and TiJi; Germany: KI.KA	Millimages; Toons 'N' Tales	Traditional
Postcards from Buster		4 seasons, 55 episodes	Marc Brown	October 11, 2004 – February 24, 2012	PBS Kids (United States); TVOKids (Canada); Kids' CBC (Canada)	Marc Brown Studios; WGBH Boston; Cookie Jar Entertainment; DQ Entertainment (seasons 2–4); Animation Services (Hong Kong), Ltd. (seasons 3–4)	Traditional
The Backyardigans	Preschool; Adventure; Comedy; Musical	4 seasons, 80 episodes	Janice Burgess	October 11, 2004 – July 12, 2013	Nickelodeon (United States); Treehouse TV (Canada)	Nickelodeon Animation Studio; Nelvana	CGI
Dragon Booster	Action; Adventure; Science fantasy Comedy drama	3 seasons, 39 episodes	Rob Travalino; Kevin Mowrer	October 23, 2004 – December 16, 2006	CBC Television	Pacific Coast Productions (seasons 1–2); Film Financial & Productions (season 3); ApolloScreen; Filmproduktion; Nerd Corps Entertainment; The Story Hat; Alliance Atlantis	CGI
ToddWorld	Educational; Comedy	2 seasons, 39 episodes	Todd Parr; Gerry Renert	November 8, 2004 – June 10, 2008	Discovery Kids	Mike Young Productions; Telegael; DQ Entertainment	Flash
Woofy	Children's series Comedy	1 season, 65 episodes	Alexandre Révérend	November 13, 2004 – February 15, 2005	France 5 (France); Télévision de Radio-Canada (Canada)	Tooncan; Alphanim	Traditional
Pet Alien	Slapstick; Comedy; Comic science fiction Absurd comedy Screwball comedy	2 seasons, 52 episodes	Jeff Muncy	November 20, 2004 – 2007	Cartoon Network/Animania HD (U.S.); TF1/Télétoon (France)	Mike Young Productions; Antefilms Production (season 1); Crest Communications (season 1); JadooWorks (season 1); Abú Media (season 1); Telegael Teoranta; KI.KA (season 2); Europool (season 2); MoonScoop (season 2); Télétoon	CGI
Pocoyo	Education	5 seasons, 295 episodes	David Cantolla; Luis Gallego; Guillermo Garcia; Colman Lopez	January 7, 2005 – present	La 2 (Spain) (series 1–2); La 1 (Spain) (series 3); CITV (United Kingdom) (series 1–2); Clan TVE (series 4–present); YouTube (series 4 p1, special episodes)	Zinkia Entertainment (2002–23); Animaj (2023–present); Granada Television; Cosgrove Hall Films (series 1); Koyi Talent (2019–23)	CGI
Tupu	Comedy	1 season, 26 episodes	Pepper Sue; Elastik Jane	April 18 – June 27, 2005	France: France 3 and Disney Channel; Germany: ZDF; Canada: Super Écran	Xilam; Tooncan	Traditional
Alien Racers	Science fiction	1 season, 26 episodes	Kevin Bloomfield; Geremi Burleigh; MGA Entertainment	May 7, 2005 – March 2, 2006	Fox	MGA Entertainment; SD Entertainment; BLT Productions, LTD	CGI
Time Warp Trio		1 season, 26 episodes	Jon Scieszka	July 9, 2005 – July 15, 2006	Discovery Kids	Soup2Nuts; WGBH Boston	Flash
Coconut Fred's Fruit Salad Island!	Comedy	2 seasons, 13 episodes	Sammy Oriti; Don Oriolo	September 17, 2005 – May 27, 2006	Kids' WB	Warner Bros. Animation	Flash
Johnny Test (2005)	Science fantasy Action; Adventure; Comedy	6 seasons, 117 episodes	Scott Fellows	September 17, 2005 – December 25, 2014	United States: The WB (2005–06); Kids' WB (2005–08); The CW (2006–08); Cartoon Network (2009–14); Canada: YTV (2005–06); Teletoon (2006–14)	Studio B Productions (seasons 1–4)/DHX Media/Vancouver (seasons 5–6); Warner Bros. Family Entertainment (seasons 1–2); Warner Bros. Animation (seasons 1–2); Coliseum Entertainment (seasons 1–2); Cookie Jar Entertainment (seasons 2–6)/DHX Cookie Jar (season 6); DHX Media (seasons 3-6)	Traditional (Digital ink-and-paint, and color) (season 1); Toon Boom (seasons 1-6); Toon Boom Harmony (seasons 2-6); Flash (seasons 2–6)
Get Ed	Science fantasy	1 season, 26 episodes	Andy Knight	September 19, 2005 – April 24, 2006	Jetix (Toon Disney); ABC Family	Jetix Animation Concepts	CGI
Jane and the Dragon	Fantasy	1 season, 26 episodes	Martin Baynton; Ross Hastings	October 15, 2005 – August 12, 2006	YTV	Nelvana Limited; Weta Enterprises	CGI
Robotboy	Science fantasy Action-adventure; Mecha; Superhero; Comedy	2 seasons, 52 episodes	Jan Van Rijsselberge	1 November 2005 – 27 September 2008	Cartoon Network (U.K.); France 3 (France)	Alphanim; LuxAnimation (series 1); Cofinova 1 (series 1)	Traditional
Raggs	Animation; Live action	3 seasons, 78 episodes	Toni Steedman	January 2, 2006 – February 18, 2009	Seven Network; PBS member stations	ABC Studios, Sydney (2006-2009); Blue Socks Media (2009–2012); Raggs LLC; Emulsion Arts; Southern Star International; KQED San Francisco	CGI/Live-action
Bernard	Comedy	6 seasons, 60 episodes	Jose Luis Ucha Enriquez; Claudio Biern Lliviria	January 3, 2006 – 2020	EBS; M6; CBBC; AnimaKids	BRB Internacional (season 1); EBS Productions; M6 Métropole Télévision; RG Animation Studios; Screen21; Synergy Media (season 2); SK Broadband (season 3)	CGI
Captain Flamingo	Fantasy; Comedy; Mystery	3 seasons, 52 episodes	Suzanne Bolch; John May	February 7, 2006 – December 19, 2010	YTV (Canada); GMA Network (Philippines)	Atomic Cartoons; Breakthrough Films & Television; Heroic Film Company; Philippine Animation Studio Inc.	Flash
The Amazing Adrenalini Brothers	Comedy	1 season, 26 episodes	Dan Chambers; Mark Huckerby; Nick Ostler	March 2006 – 2007	CITV; Cartoon Network; YTV; VRAK.TV	Pesky; Studio B Productions; Bejuba! Entertainment	Flash
Pinky Dinky Doo	Fantasy	2 seasons, 52 episodes	Jim Jinkins	April 10, 2006 – April 8, 2011	Noggin	Sesame Workshop; Cartoon Pizza; Abrams-Gentile Entertainment (season 2); Keyframe Digital Productions (season 2)	Flash (season 1); CGI (season 2); Live action
The Owl	Comedy	1 season, 52 episodes	Alexandre So	May 5, 2006 – July 12, 2007	France 3	Studio Hari; TV-Loonland AG; France Télévisions	CGI
Shuriken School	Fantasy; Comedy	1 season, 26 episodes	Emilio Gallego; Jesùs Gallego	August 20, 2006 – December 21, 2007	Jetix; France 3	Zinkia Entertainment; Xilam Animation	Flash/Traditional
Viva Piñata	Comedy	2 seasons, 52 episodes	Norman J. Grossfeld; Lloyd Goldfine	August 26, 2006 – January 18, 2009	Canada: YTV; United States: Fox (2006–07) and The CW (2008)	Bardel Entertainment; 4Kids Entertainment; Microsoft	CGI
School for Vampires	Horror comedy Dark fantasy Black comedy	4 seasons, 104 episodes	Gerhard Hahn; Antony Power	August 26, 2006 – November 3, 2010	KI.KA; ARD	Rai Fiction; Cartoon-One; Hahn Film	Traditional
Bali	Adventure; Comedy; Musical	3 seasons, 26 episodes	Magdalena Richard; Laurent Richard	September 4, 2006 – February 23, 2008	Télévision de Radio-Canada/TVOntario/Knowledge Network (Canada); France 5/Playhouse Disney (France)	Planet Nemo Animation; Subsequence Animation	Traditional
Erky Perky	Comedy; Animated sitcom CGI	3 seasons, 39 episodes	David Webster	September 7, 2006 – December 7, 2009	Canada: YTV; Australia: Seven Network	CCI Entertainment; Ambience Entertainment; The LaB Sydney	CGI
Growing Up Creepie	Dark comedy Science fiction Educational; Horror	1 season, 26 episodes	Anthony Gaud; Chris Woods; Carin Greenberg	September 16, 2006 – June 21, 2008	Discovery Kids	Mike Young Productions; Telegael; Sunwoo Entertainment; Peach Blossom Media	Flash
Handy Manny	Children's television series Educational	3 seasons, 113 episodes	Roger Bollen; Marilyn Sadler; Rick Gitelson	September 16, 2006 – February 14, 2013	Playhouse Disney (2006–2011); Disney Junior (2011–2013)	Nelvana	CGI
Pucca	Action-adventure; Martial arts Slapstick comedy	3 seasons, 65 episodes	Boo Kyoung Kim; Calvin Kim	September 18, 2006 – October 31, 2019	Toon Disney/Jetix (2006–08); MBC TV (2018–19)	Studio B Productions (2006–08); Bazooka Studio (2018–19)	Flash (seasons 1–2); CGI (season 3)
Bigfoot Presents: Meteor and the Mighty Monster Trucks		1 season, 26 episodes	David Snyder; Bill Gross	September 25, 2006 – October 11, 2008	Discovery Kids	Endgame Entertainment; Big Bang Digital Studios; Brandissimo Inc. CCI Entertainment	CGI
Eloise: The Animated Series	Comedy	1 season, 13 episodes	Wes Archer	October 8 – November 12, 2006	Starz Kids & Family	HandMade Films; Starz Media	Flash
I Got a Rocket!	Comedy; Science fiction	1 season, 26 episodes	Stu Connolly; Ben Townsend	December 1, 2006 – May 24, 2007	KI.KA; Nickelodeon; Network Ten; Kabillion; Korean Broadcasting System	SLR Productions; Mike Young Productions; MotionWorks; Europool; Peach Blossom Media; Sunwoo Entertainment	Flash
Z-Squad	Adventure; Action	1 season, 26 episodes	Enpix+ Nelvana	December 4, 2006 – June 4, 2007	SBS	Enemes; Daiwon C&A Holdings KT; Soviks; Nelvana	CGI
El Tigre: The Adventures of Manny Rivera	Action-adventure; Comedy; Fantasy; Superhero	1 season, 26 episodes	Jorge Gutierrez; Sandra Equihua	March 3, 2007 – September 13, 2008	Nickelodeon (episodes 1–22); Nicktoons Network (episodes 23–26)	Mexopolis; Nickelodeon Animation Studio	Flash
Chop Socky Chooks	Action; Fantasy	1 season, 26 episodes	Sergio Delfino	March 16, 2007 – September 4, 2008	Cartoon Network (UK); Teletoon	Aardman Animations; Decode Entertainment	CGI
Wilbur	Preschool	1 season, 26 episodes	Kim Anton; Tracey Hornbuckle; Jill Luedtke	April 16, 2007 – March 18, 2008	CBC	Mercury Filmworks; Chilco Productions; EKA Distribution; Egmont Imagination	Live-action/Puppetry/Flash
George of the Jungle	Comedy	2 seasons, 52 episodes		June 29, 2007 – February 18, 2017	Teletoon (Canada); Cartoon Network (US, season 1)	Bullwinkle Studios; Classic Media; Studio B Productions (season 1); Switch Animation; August Media; August Rights (season 2)	Flash
Iggy Arbuckle	Animated sitcom	1 season, 26 episodes		June 29 – October 10, 2007	Teletoon (Canada); National Geographic (United States)	C.O.R.E. Digital Studios; National Geographic Kids; NGC Studios; Blueprint Entertainment	Flash
Finley the Fire Engine		2 seasons, 78 episodes		July 23, 2007 – November 30, 2012	BBC One; BBC Two; CBeebies	Balley Beg Animation Studios; RHI Entertainment; Kickstart Productions	CGI
Super Why!	Children's television series Educational	3 seasons, 103 episodes	Angela Santomero; Samantha Freeman Alpert	September 3, 2007 – May 12, 2016	PBS Kids	Out of the Blue Enterprises; Decode Entertainment (Season 1–2); DHX Studios Halifax (Season 3)	CGI; Flash
Happy Monster Band		2 seasons, 20 episodes	Don Carter	October 1, 2007 – October 28, 2008	Playhouse Disney	Kickstart Productions; Titmouse, Inc.	Flash
Edgar & Ellen	Adventure; Comedy; Fantasy; Horror	1 season, 26 episodes	Charles Ogden; Rick Carton	October 7, 2007 – October 30, 2008	Nicktoons (United States); YTV (Canada)	Studio B Productions; Bardel Entertainment; Star Farm Productions; Nicktoons Network Original Productions	Flash
The Future Is Wild		1 season, 26 episodes	Steve Sullivan	October 13, 2007 – July 5, 2008	Discovery Kids (United States); Teletoon (Canada)	Nelvana	CGI
Monster Buster Club	Action; Adventure; Comic science fiction Police procedural Science fantasy Monster of the week	2 seasons, 52 episodes	Vincent Chalvon-Demersay; David Michel	October 29, 2007 – November 14, 2009	TF1 (France); YTV (Canada); Jetix (Europe)	Marathon Media; Image Entertainment Corporation	CGI
Sushi Pack	Action; Adventure; Comedy; Superhero	2 seasons, 52 episodes	Tom Ruegger; Nicholas Hollander	November 3, 2007 – February 28, 2009	CBS	Studio Espinosa; Tom Ruegger Productions; CloudCo, Inc. The Hatchery; DIC Entertainment Corporation; American Greetings	Flash/Traditional
Cosmic Quantum Ray		1 season, 26 episodes	Mani Lal Bhaumik	November 7, 2007 – 2008	Animalia HD; The Hub	Mike Young Productions; Method Animation; Cosmotoons; Ocean Productions; Europool; Telegael; SK C&C; Independence Creative; Maya Entertainment	CGI
Animalia		2 seasons, 40 episodes	Graeme Base	November 11, 2007 – May 11, 2008	Network Ten (Australia); CBBC (United Kingdom); PBS Kids Go! (United States); Kids CBC (Canada)	Burberry Productions; Animalia Productions; PorchLight Entertainment; Lux Animation	CGI
Farmkids	Children's television series Comedy	2 seasons, 26 episodes		2008			CGI
Eliot Kid	Adventure; Children's television series Comedy	2 seasons, 104 episodes	Sebástian Dorsey	March 3, 2008 – June 27, 2012	TF1 (France); CBBC (United Kingdom)	Samka Productions; Safari de Ville	Flash
Famous 5: On the Case	Fantasy; Mystery; Comedy	1 season, 26 episodes	Douglas Tuber and Tim Maile	April 5 – September 27, 2008	France 3 (France); Disney XD (United Kingdom)	Marathon Media Group; Chorion	Traditional
Speed Racer: The Next Generation	Action; Adventure; Sports	2 seasons, 52 episodes	Larry Schwarz	May 2, 2008 – August 25, 2013	Nicktoons	Speed Racer Enterprises; Animation Collective (season 1); Telegael (season 2); Toonz Entertainment; Lionsgate Television	Flash
Three Delivery	Action; Adventure; Martial arts	1 season, 26 episodes	Larry Schwarz	June 27, 2008 – June 28, 2009	Nicktoons (United States); YTV (Canada)	Animation Collective; Fatkat; PVP Animations	Flash
Martha Speaks	Comedy; Educational	6 seasons, 96 episodes	Susan Meddaugh	September 1, 2008 – November 18, 2014	PBS Kids	Studio B Productions (seasons 1–3)/DHX Media Vancouver (season 4); Oasis Animation (seasons 5–6); WGBH Boston	Flash
My Big Big Friend	Comedy; Children's television series Adventure; Fantasy	2 seasons, 52 episodes	Andrés Lieban; Claudia Koogan Breitman	September 1, 2008 – February 28, 2011	Treehouse TV; TV Brasil	2DLab; Breakthrough Animation	Flash
Willa's Wild Life	Comedy; Preschool; Supernatural; Fantasy	1 season, 26 episodes	Dan Yaccarino	October 6, 2008 – January 31, 2009	YTV; TF1/Piwi+	Futurikon; Nelvana Limited	Toon Boom Harmony
Matt's Monsters	Science fiction comedy Action-adventure; Occult mystery Fantasy	1 season, 52 episodes	Jan Van Rijsselberge	December 20, 2008 – January 14, 2009	France: Canal+ Family and M6; Italy: Rai Due	Gaumont-Alphanim; Lanterna Magica; Rai Fiction	Traditional/Flash
Rahan: Son of the Dark Age	Comedy; Action	1 season, 26 episodes		December 22, 2008 – 2009	Canal+ Family; Rai	Xilam Animation; France 3 Rai Fiction; Castelrosso Films	Traditional
The Garfield Show	Comedy; Adventure	5 seasons, 107 episodes	Philippe Vidal; Robert Rea; Steve Balissat	December 22, 2008 – April 27, 2015	France 3 (France); Cartoon Network (United States, seasons 1–3); Boomerang (United States, seasons 4–5)	Dargaud Media; Paws, Inc.	CGI
Monk Little Dog	Comedy	1 season, 52 episodes	Natalys Raut-Sieuzac; Kim Sung-jae	June 16, 2009 – June 11, 2010	Canal+ EBS	Kim's Licensing; Timoon Animation; SAMG Animation; Millimages	CGI
Bunny Maloney	Comedy; Action	1 season, 52 episodes	Nicolaï "Méko" Chauvet; Utku Kaplan; Nicolas Flory	June 29 – August 19, 2009	Canal+ Canal+ Family; Game One; Kabillion	MoonScoop; Telegael; France Télévisions	CGI
Hot Wheels Battle Force 5	Action-adventure; Science fiction Drama	2 seasons, 52 episodes		August 29, 2009 – July 16, 2011	Teletoon; Cartoon Network	Nerd Corps Entertainment; Nelvana Limited; Mattel, Inc.	CGI
Dinosaur Train	Adventure; Musical; Educational; Preschool; Comedy	5 seasons, 101 episodes	Craig Bartlett	September 7, 2009 – April 12, 2021	PBS Kids	Infocomm Media Development Authority; Sparky Animation; The Jim Henson Company; FableVision; Snee-Oosh, Inc. (uncredited); Tail Waggin' Productions	CGI
Clang Invasion	Science fiction comedy Action; Cyberpunk; Animated sitcom	1 season, 26 episodes	Seng Choon Meng	September 12, 2009 – February 12, 2010	YTV	AGOGO Entertainment Ltd. Scrawl Studios; Decode Entertainment	Flash
Geronimo Stilton	Action; Adventure; Comedy	3 seasons, 78 episodes	Pietro Marietti	September 15, 2009 – February 28, 2017	Rai 2 (Italy); Rai Gulp (Italy); M6 (France, seasons 1–2); France 5 (France, season 3)	Atlantyca Entertainment; Rai Fiction; MoonScoop (seasons 1–2); Superprod Animation (season 3); Backup Media (season 3)	Traditional
The Twisted Whiskers Show	Comedy	1 season, 26 episodes	David Sacks	September 26, 2009 – March 1, 2010	The Hub	American Greetings Properties; DQ Entertainment; MoonScoop LLC; CloudCo, Inc. Telegael	CGI
Jungle Junction	Adventure; Educational	2 seasons, 47 episodes	Trevor Ricketts	October 5, 2009 – October 26, 2012	Playhouse Disney (2009–11); Disney Junior (2011–12)	Spider Eye Productions	CGI
CJ the DJ	Animated sitcom Musical	1 season, 52 episodes	Stu Connoly; Mark Gravas	December 4, 2009 – March 25, 2010	ABC3	Kapow Pictures; Vision Animation; Millimages	Flash

== See also ==
- List of children's animated films
