= Hi-Fi (album) =

Compilation album by Compulsion
- Released: 1995
- Recorded: 1992, 1993, 1994
- Genre: Alternative rock
- Producer: Compulsion, Ian Caple

Hi-Fi is a compilation album released by Compulsion in 1995.

== Track listing ==
1. "Plan"
2. "Accident Ahead"
3. "How Do I Breathe?"
4. "A Little Mistake"
5. "Yabba Yabba Yes Yes Yes"
6. "Little Marks"
7. "Mall Monarchy"
8. "Easterman"
9. "Pink And Forty-nine"
10. "Ninefourth"
11. "Why Do We Care?"

== Sound studios ==
- Producer - Ian Caple, tracks: 1–3, 5, 6, 8–11
- Producer - Compulsion, tracks 4 & 7
- Tracks 8, 10 taken from the first EP (Fabulon Records Flon 1201, 1992)
- Tracks 2, 3, 5 taken from the EP Casserole (Fabulon Records Flon 1202, 1993)
- Tracks 1, 6, 9, 11 taken from the EP Safety (One Little Indian, 1993)
- Tracks 4, 7 taken from the EP Mall Monarchy (One Little Indian, 1994)

== Personnel ==
- Josephmary - vocals, trombone
- Garret Lee - vocals, guitar, electronics
- Sid Rainey - bass
- Jan-Willem Alkema - drums
