= Conspiracy of Silence (2003 film) =

- Directed by: John Deery
- Written by: John Deery
- Produced by: John Deery & Davina Stanley
- Starring: Jonathan Forbes; Jason Barry; Hugh Quarshie; Hugh Bonneville; Sean McGinley; Chris O'Dowd; Brenda Fricker
- Cinematography: Jason Lehel
- Edited by: Jamie Trevill
- Music by: Francis Haines; Stephen W. Parsons
- Production companies: Flick Features; Little Wing Films
- Distributed by: TLA Releasing (USA - DVD); Element Pictures (UK and Ireland - DVD); Watch Entertainment (USA - theatrical); Joejack Entertainment (Non-USA - DVD)
- Release dates: 2003 (limited); 2014 (re-release)
- Running time: 90 minutes
- Countries: United Kingdom; Ireland
- Language: English
- Budget: $3 million
- Box office: $2,598

Conspiracy of Silence is a British drama film set in Ireland and inspired by real events. The film challenges celibacy and its implication for the Catholic Church in the 21st century.

Written and directed by John Deery, the cast includes: Academy Award-winner Brenda Fricker, Hugh Bonneville, Chris O'Dowd, John Lynch, Jonathan Forbes, Jason Barry, Sean McGinley, Fintan McKeown, Jim Norton and Hugh Quarshie.

The movie won many international awards including the U.S. National Board of Review of Motion Pictures' Freedom of Expression Award in 2004, which it shared with Michael Moore's Fahrenheit 9/11 and Mel Gibson's The Passion of the Christ. Deery was also nominated for Best Film Director at the Irish Film Awards in 2003. The screenplay was developed at the Sundance Screenwriters' Lab in Utah and won the Hartley-Merrill International Screenwriting Award presented to Deery at the Cannes Film Festival in 2001.

The film was invited to be shown at many film festivals in 2003 to be in Competition and/or Official Selection including: Taormina, Italy (first public screening, June 2003), Moscow International Film Festival, Opening Night film at the Galway Film Festival, Ireland, Montreal Film Festival, Hamburg Film Festival, Warsaw Film Festival where it won a Special Jury Award, Dinard Festival of British Cinema, France, and the American Film Institute (AFI) Festival in Los Angeles. It received an art house release in the United States. The film is available on Amazon Prime in the UK.

== Plot ==
Father Sweeney (Patrick Casey), a gay Catholic priest living with HIV, commits suicide. His death leads local investigative journalist David Foley (Jason Barry) to write a story that publicly identifies Sweeney as having HIV.

At the local seminary, two students near ordination are expelled because one, Daniel (Jonathon Forbes) was seen leaving the room of the other, Niall (Paudge Behan). Niall is gay and Daniel is straight and they engaged in no sexual activity but were still expelled for the sake of appearances. Daniel returns home, where he is torn between his calling to the priesthood and his love for his ex-girlfriend Sinead (Catherine Walker).

Daniel meets with Foley, who writes a follow-up article exposing a covered-up AIDS protest that Sweeney had staged at the Vatican three years earlier and Daniel's dismissal. He also alleges that cardinals close to the Pope are engaged in sexual relationships and calls on the Church to re-examine its celibacy requirement for priests. The local bishop, Michael Quinn (Jim Norton), pressures the editor of the local paper not to run the second story. The editor acquiesces but after reading the story sends it to the Irish Times, which prints it.

The next day the bishop, his aide, Foley and Daniel appear together in a live television debate. Before the broadcast, agents of the Church threaten to harm Foley's family unless he retracts his story on the air. Bishop Quinn offers to reinstate Daniel if Daniel is willing to admit he has been wrong. On-air Foley capitulates but Daniel does not, asking the bishop if he himself practices celibacy. When the bishop refuses to answer, Father Sweeney's partner, former priest Matthew Francis (John Lynch) confronts Quinn with Sweeney's suicide note in which Sweeney discloses that Quinn and he had had an affair.

At film's end, Daniel is back at home with Sinead.

== Cast ==
- Jonathan Forbes ... Daniel McLaughlin
- Hugh Bonneville ... Fr. Jack Dowling
- Brenda Fricker ... Annie McLaughlin
- Seán McGinley ... Fr. Rector Cathal
- Hugh Quarshie ... Fr. Joseph Ennis, S.J.
- Jason Barry ... David Foley
- Paudge Behan ... Niall
- Sean Boru ... Father Murphy
- Olivia Caffrey ... Liz Foley
- Tommy Carey ... Sean
- Padraig O'Loinsigh (as Patrick Lynch) ... Fr. Frank Sweeney
- Carmel Cryan ... Mrs. McDermott
- Catherine Cusack ... Mary McLaughlin
- Patrick Doyle ... Senior Umpire #1
- Patrick Duggan ... Micky
- Christopher Dunne ... Fr. Martin Hennessy
- Jim Dunne ... Senior Umpire #2
- James Ellis ... Jim O'Brien
- Anna Rose Fullen ... Martha
- Jim Howlin ... Team Manager
- Jason Kavanagh ... Liam
- Sinead Keenan ... Majella
- John Lynch ... Fr. Matthew Francis
- Edward MacLiam ... Fitzpatrick
- Owen McDonnell ... Noel
- Fintan McKeown ... Monsignor Thomas
- Kevin McMahon ... Donal
- Brendan McNamara ... Declan
- Justine Mitchell ... Assistant Floor Manager
- Ciaran Murtagh ... Michael
- Jim Norton ... Bishop Michael Quinn
- Niall O'Brien ... John
- Chris O'Dowd ... James
- Aidan O'Hara ... Paul
- Lillian Patton ... Molly
- Sid Rainey ... Joe
- Phil Roache ... Supporter
- Fergal Spelman ... TV Director
- Elaine Symons ... Marie
- Harry Towb ... Father Doherty
- Catherine Walker ... Sinead
- Nuala Walsh ... Mrs. McGlynn

== Release ==
The film got a limited US theatrical release in December 2004, following its festival screenings.

=== 2014 re-release ===
The film was re-launched at the Berlin International Film Festival in February 2014 by a new US boutique sales company, Angel Grace Productions, headed by Michael Fister.

== Reception ==
=== Critical response ===
On the review aggregator website Rotten Tomatoes, 35% of 26 critics' reviews are positive, with an average rating of 5.3/10. Metacritic, which uses a weighted average, assigned the film a score of 46 out of 100, based on 13 critics, indicating "mixed or average" reviews.

=== Awards and nominations ===
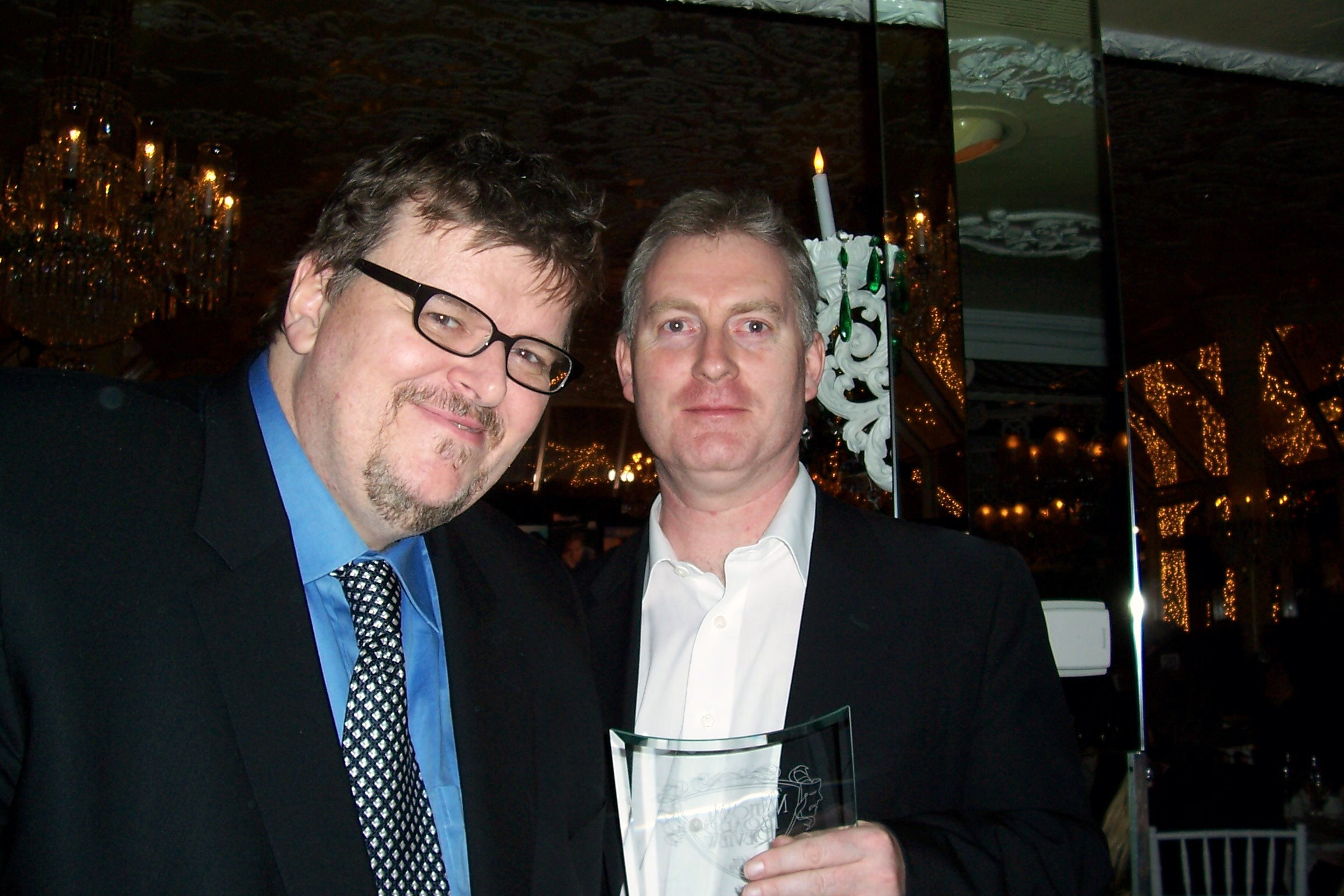
Deery with Michael Moore in 2005 after accepting NBR award

Year	Award	Category	Recipient	Result
2001	Hartley-Merrill	International Screenwriting Award	John Deery	Won
2001	Sundance Screenwriters' Lab	Fellowship	John Deery	Won
2003	Dinard British Film Festival	Golden Hitchcock	Conspiracy of Silence	Nominated
2003	Irish Film and Television Awards	Best Film Director	John Deery	Nominated
2003	Warsaw International Film Festival	Special Mention	Conspiracy of Silence	Won
2004	National Board of Review	Freedom of Expression Award	Conspiracy of Silence	Won
