= Jonathan Forbes (disambiguation) =

Jonathan Forbes is an Irish actor.

Jonathan Forbes may also refer to:

- Jonathan Forbes (programmer), co-inventor of the LZX compression algorithm and file archiver
- Jonathan Forbes (officer), British army major involved in the discovery of Sigiriya in 1831
