= Joella Productions =

British television production company

Joella Productions was a television production company based in London's Twickenham that produced the children's television series Underground Ernie for the BBC with the help of 3D Films. It was founded by John Deery and Sid Rainey and named after Deery's son, Joe, and Rainey's daughter, Ella. It was founded in 2002 and went out of business in 2011.
