= The Future Is Medium =

Studio album by Compulsion
- Released: 27 May 1996
- Genre: Punk rock
- Length: 45:50
- Label: One Little Indian
- Producer: Mark Freegard, Garret Lee

Compulsion chronology
Comforter (1994)	The Future Is Medium (1996)

The Future Is Medium is the second studio album by Irish rock band Compulsion, released on 27 May 1996. It was produced by Mark Freegard and Garret Lee; Freegard handled recording (with engineer Darren Mahomed) and mixing (engineer Steven Cook). The band promoted the album with a UK tour in June and July 1996 with Evil Superstars.

== Reception ==
Professional ratings
Review scores
Source	Rating
AllMusic	3.5/5 stars
NME	8/10
Rock Hard	8.5/10

AllMusic reviewer Jack Rabid wrote that while The Future Is Medium was not as "heavy, proud, and mighty as Comforter," the former was "just as edgy and takes more chances". Marcus Schleutermann of Rock Hard wrote that the punk boom would end that summer but Compulsion would remain due to having "enough identity of their own to be able to survive in the long term". He explained that the tracks had "plenty of nooks and crannies without affecting their accessibility". In a review for NME, Kitty Empire wrote that Freehard helped the band give "birth to 16 songs so bouncy they could punch a hole in your hi-fi casing". She added that the album was "chock-a-block with lethal hooks that dig in and fester, buzzing with the kind of riffs that have you cartwheeling". Paul Brannigan of Louder called the album a "fiercely intelligent and painfully relevant examination of societal ills and the draining of hope and humanity in the name of 'progress'."

== Track listing ==
Track listing per booklet.

1. "All We Heard Was a Dull Thud" – 4:01
2. "Question Time for the Proles" – 3:56
3. "Juvenile Scene Detective" – 3:37
4. "It's Great" – 2:23
5. "They're Breeding the Grey Things Again" – 2:44
6. "Fast Song" – 1:51
7. "Western Culture Collector" – 3:21
8. "Happy Monster" – 2:57
9. "Belly Laugh" – 2:37
10. "Is This Efficient Living?" – 3:00
11. "Down the Edifice" – 2:51
12. "Happy Ending" – 3:38
13. "Burst" – 1:02
14. "Lost on Abbey Road" – 2:05
15. "Spotlight Into Space" – 1:08
16. "Me" – 4:28

== Personnel ==
Personnel per booklet.

Compulsion

- Josephmary – vocals, trombone
- Garret Lee – guitar, vocals, electronics
- Sid Rainey – bass
- Jan-Willem Alkema – drums

Production and design

- Mark Freegard – producer, recording, mixing
- Garret Lee – producer, design, artwork
- Darren Mahomed – assistant recording engineer
- Steven Cook – assistant mix engineer
- Andrew Sutton – design, artwork
- Mike Diver – group photo
