= Compulsion (band) =

Irish punk band

- Origin: Ireland
- Genres: Punk rock, alternative rock, new wave of new wave
- Years active: 1990–1997
- Labels: Elektra, Interscope, One Little Indian
- Past members: Garret Lee; Josephmary; Sid Rainey; Jan-Willem Alkema
- Website: bandplanet.co.uk/forgottenbandplanet/compulsion/compulsionbiography.htm

Compulsion were an Irish punk band. They were formed in 1990 by Josephmary, aka Joey Barry, (singer) and Sid Rainey (bassist) as Thee Amazing Colossal Men. They signed a recording contract with Virgin Records, but after winning a lawsuit against their record label, they became 'Compulsion' in 1992. Joined by guitarist Garret Lee and drummer Jan-Willem Alkema, they moved to North London and signed to One Little Indian. They released several EPs and two albums. The first, Comforter, was labeled by the NME as part of the "New Wave of New Wave", while the second, The Future is Medium, saw them sport identical black outfits and orange hairdos.

The group split in 1997 after the label One Little Indian dropped them. After Compulsion, Lee formed Jacknife Lee, and later produced Snow Patrol and U2. Alkema joined China Drum and later Driven to Collision. Rainey is now a writer and has created and produced an animated children's TV series called Underground Ernie for the BBC. Barry returned to Ireland and worked as a landscaper for 25 years.

== Discography ==
=== Studio albums ===
- Comforter (1994) - UK No. 59
- The Future Is Medium (1996)

=== Singles ===
- "Mall Monarchy" (1994) - UK No. 87
- "Basketcase" (1994) (called "Delivery" in the US release)
- "Eating" (fan club only release, 1994)
- "Question Time for the Proles" (1996)
- "Juvenile Scene Detective" (1996)

=== EPs ===
- Compulsion (1992)
- Casserole (1993)
- Safety (1993)
- Boogie Woogie (1994)

=== Compilations ===
- Hi-Fi Compilation (Compilation, 1995)
- I Like Compulsion and Compulsion Likes Me (Compilation, 2002)
