= Jonathan Forbes =

Irish actor (born 1976)

- Born: 4 December 1976 (age 49); Dublin, Ireland
- Occupations: Actor, voice actor
- Years active: 1997–present

Jonathan Forbes (born 4 December 1976) is an Irish actor.

== Early life ==
Forbes was born in Dublin, Ireland on 4 December 1976. He attended Gonzaga College where he was in the same class as fellow actor Andrew Scott, before studying English at University College Dublin.

== Career ==
Forbes trained at Bristol Old Vic Theatre School, graduating in 2001 as a BBC Carleton Hobbs Award winner.

In 2001 he played the lead role in John Deery's debut feature Conspiracy of Silence, for which he was nominated Best Newcomer at the inaugural Irish Film and Television Awards. He made his stage debut in Trevor Nunn's production of A Streetcar Named Desire at The Lyttelton Theatre in 2002. Other theatre highlights include Michael Boyd's first season at the RSC (Romeo and Juliet, Hamlet, King Lear), Cyrano de Bergerac (Chichester Festival Theatre) and The Good Soldier (Theatre Royal Bath). Television highlights include Hornblower, Foyle's War and Titanic, Blood and Steel.

In 2011, he appeared in "The National Anthem", an episode of the anthology series Black Mirror.

From 2013 to 2016, Forbes has provided the voice of the character Connor in the CGI version of the iconic British TV series Thomas and Friends.

In 2015 he starred opposite Sharon Horgan and American comedian Rob Delaney in Catastrophe, a six-part comedy series for Channel 4 which first aired in the UK on 19 January 2015. The second series of the show also aired in 2015, and the third in 2017. The fourth and final series was broadcast in 2019.

Forbes potrtrayed Freddy Fuller in the BBC Radio 4 drama Tracks from 2016 to 2020.

In 2019, Forbes starred as the title character in the play Hamlet, which began its performance on 28 March 2019

== Filmography ==
=== Film ===
Year	Title	Role	Notes
1997	The Art of Salesmanship	Stewart	Short film
2003	Conspiracy of Silence	Daniel McLaughlin	
2013	Thomas & Friends: King of the Railway	Connor (voice)	UK/US versions
2014	Made	David	Short film
2016	Thomas & Friends: The Great Race	Connor (voice)	UK/US versions
2018	All The World's a Stage	The Actor	Short film
2018	Eve	Toby Lang	Post-production

=== Television ===
Year	Title	Role	Notes
2002	The Magnificent Ambersons	First Beau	Television movie
2003	Horatio Hornblower 3	Midshipman Charles Orrock	Television movie
2003	Hornblower: Duty	Midshipman Charles Orrock	Television movie
2007	The Bill	Kevin Todd	Episode: "Cracking Under Pressure"
2007	Doctors	Jake Wallis	Episode: "Sand"
2008	Foyle's War	Johann	Episode: "Broken Souls"
2010	Bloody Foreigners	Witold Urbanowicz	Episode: "The Untold Battle of Britain"
2011	Casualty	Jack Tanner	Episode: "Starting Over"
2011	Black Mirror	Browne	Episode: "The National Anthem"
2012	Titanic: Blood and Steel	Eddy Hatton	11 episodes Television miniseries
2013	Holby City	Todd Parish	Episode: "Unravelled"
2013–16	Thomas & Friends	Connor (voice)	UK/US versions
2015	Pypo	Victor	Episode: "Lactation"
2015-2017	Catastrophe	Fergal	13 episodes
2015	Pypo	Police Officer	Episode: "Asking for It"
2015	New Tricks	John Hartwell	Episode: "The Russian Cousin"
2017	Fearless	Dominic Truelove	6 episodes Television miniseries

=== Video games ===
Year	Title	Role	Notes
2018	Vampyr	Sean Hampton (voice)	
2020	Gwent: The Witcher Card Game	Gezras of Leyda (voice)	In the "Way of the Witcher" expansion.
2022	Dying Light 2 Stay Human	Hakon (voice)	
2024	Elden Ring Shadow of the Erdtree	Hornsent (voice)	

=== Radio ===
Year	Title	Role	Notes
2016-2020	Tracks	Freddy Fuller	
2026	Dead Giveaway - A Charles Paris Mystery	Sean	
