= Underground Ernie =

2006 British animated children's television series

- Genre: Children's television series
- Created by: John Deery; Sid Rainey
- Starring: Gary Lineker; Janet Brown; Emma Weaver; Tim Whitnall; Chris Jarvis; Howard Ward
- Theme music composer: Miles Hunt, Sid Rainey, Martin Bell (The Wonder Stuff)
- Opening theme: "The Importance of Being Ernie"
- Ending theme: "The Importance of Being Ernie"
- Country of origin: United Kingdom
- Original language: English
- No. of series: 1
- No. of episodes: 26 (list of episodes)

Production
- Executive producers: John Deery; Sid Rainey
- Running time: 12 minutes per episode
- Production companies: 3D Films; Joella Productions

Original release
- Network: CBeebies
- Release: 5 June – 23 December 2006

Underground Ernie is a 2006 British-animated children's television series produced by Joella Productions for the BBC on both CBeebies and BBC Two, and sold internationally by BBC Worldwide. It is set in the International Underground, a fictional worldwide underground railway network based on the London Underground, and focuses on the everyday adventures of Ernie, an underground supervisor, Millie, his colleague, and Mr. Rails, the maintenance man.

The metro trains under Ernie's watch all have characters of their own. There is Victoria, Bakerloo, Jubilee, Circle and the twins, Hammersmith & City. Occasionally joined by other trains from across the world including; Brooklyn, Paris, Sydney, Osaka and Moscow.

The show is aimed at children between the ages of 3 and 8 years. The series had twenty six episodes, lasting twelve minutes each. In October 2005, the series was officially announced, with it premiering the following year. Its first showing on was on 5 June 2006 on BBC Two at 9:00am. It later premiered on CBeebies until 23 December 2006, and was last aired in 2009

== Creation ==
Writer John Deery and musician Sid Rainey, formerly of the band Compulsion, formed a production company in 2000 by the name of Joella Productions. During a brainstorming session, Sid came up with the idea of a children's TV series based on the names of tube stations, which is how Underground Ernie was born.

== Premise ==
The series focuses on the adventures of Ernie, the controller of the International Underground. He works with his colleagues, including a computer expert Millie who loves all things international, and Mr. Rails, the maintenance man who has been working on the railway for over 25 years. The metro trains have their own characters too. Victoria is the oldest and has seen it all. She acts as a grandmother figure to all the trains, offering a helping hand whenever they need guidance, Bakerloo is the detective of the Underground, while Hammersmith and City are two fast and furious twins who love quizzes and banking, Jubilee is the youngest of the team, and he's gadget mad, as well as being very mischievous, and Circle is the hippy chick, who loves nature and animals, as well as helping her friends out. Over the course of the series, they are joined by their friends from across the world, such as the snooty Paris, gentle giant Moscow and fun-loving Brooklyn. In each episode, Ernie comes across a problem that he needs a fix, needing the help of the trains, the passengers, or both.

== Production ==
At one point during production, Canadian-based distributor Fremantle Corporation was involved in the distribution.

The BBC was due to start broadcasting the show in 2005, but the BBC delayed it out of sensitivity after the July 7th bombings of that year.

=== Design ===
All the visuals for the show are produced using computer-generated imagery, and the cost of production was high. The first series was produced using LightWave 3D software.

Some critics have pointed out the similarities between Underground Ernie and Thomas the Tank Engine and Friends, in that both series feature anthropomorphic locomotives. Whilst acknowledging a similarity, the producers make it clear that this is very different from Thomas, and is very much based in the twenty first century. Despite being underground metro trains, they often travel overground through the open countryside to various stations beyond the city, including a seaside resort.

The overall design is inspired by the real London Underground, and Transport for London has allowed the series to use design elements directly taken from their brand, in particular the use of their distinctive Underground logo, or 'roundel' as it is known.

3D Films (who previously animated another series called The Wheels on the Bus) is responsible for the animation provided, even though both Joella Productions and 3D Films had a bad relationship during production.

== Characters ==
=== Humans ===
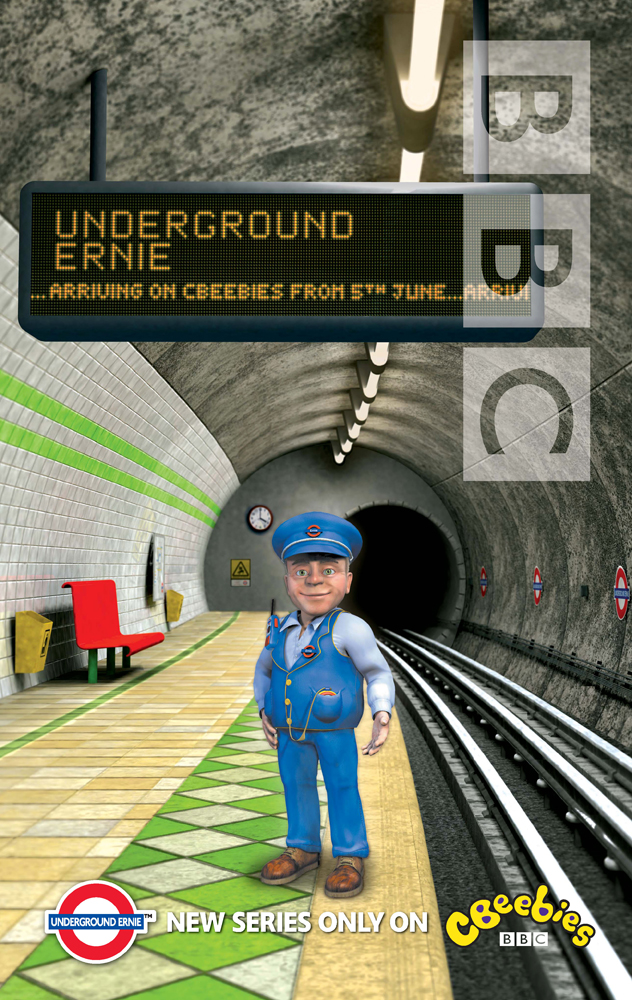
Poster for Underground Ernie featuring the titular character

- Underground Ernie (voiced by ex footballer and television sports presenter Gary Lineker) is the eponymous supervisor who owns the International Underground station.
- Millie (voiced by Emma Weaver) is a computer expert working on the network, and the co-owner of the station.
- Mr. Rails (voiced by Howard Ward) is the maintenance man.

=== Trains ===
The majority of the characters are metro trains, most of which take their names from the lines of the London Underground network, although in Underground Ernie's world, it is called the "International Underground".

- Victoria (voiced by Janet Brown) .
- Bakerloo (voiced by Howard Ward) is an eccentric train and wears a deerstalker hat similar to that of Sherlock Holmes.
- Hammersmith & City (voiced by Tim Whitnall and Chris Jarvis) are twin brothers.
- Jubilee (voiced by Tim Whitnall).
- Circle (voiced by Chris Jarvis).

There are also five international trains, which Millie visits when she goes abroad every weekend. She always bring back exciting stories for Ernie, as well as a souvenir:

- Brooklyn (voiced by Howard Ward)
- Paris (voiced by Tim Whitnall)
- Sydney (voiced by Emma Weaver)
- Osaka (also voiced by Tim Whitnall)
- Moscow (voiced by Howard Ward).

== Episodes ==
In each twelve minute episode Ernie faces a problem, which he needs to fix with the help of the trains, people, or both. This will typically involve one of the locations on International Underground or visitors coming via the Underground, often both.

No.	Title	Written by	Original release date
1	"Pop Decoy"	Louise Kramskoy	5 June 2006
Jubilee lets slip his secret about pop superstar Sam 7. Bakerloo gets into pop.
2	"Sir Clunkalot"	Diane Redmond	6 June 2006
The medieval pageant sees Ernie save a damsel in distress.
3	"Mister Rails Never Fails"	Diane Redmond	7 June 2006
Ernie's severe cold leads to confusion over the arrangements for Mr. Rails' surprise party.
4	"Brooklyn and Rocky Two Shoes"	Diane Redmond	8 June 2006
An American athlete, Rocky Two Shoes, comes in on Brooklyn and overcomes his fears.
5	"Catnapped"	Louise Kramskoy	9 June 2006
Pippa's cat, Patch, goes missing during the heavy rain storm.
6	"Caught Purple Handed"	Diane Redmond	12 June 2006
A rather absent-minded explorer brings a rare plant to the Underground.
7	"Ernie's Big Trip"	Jan Page	13 June 2006
Paris visits. Is Ernie going to France forever? Don't go, Ernie!
8	"Finders Keepers"	Jan Page	14 June 2006
A Golden Ticket becomes lost property.
9	"Summer Breeze"	Louise Kramskoy	15 June 2006
Phew, what a scorcher on the Underground!
10	"Cover Story"	Ross Hastings	16 June 2006
While Ernie tries to take some photos for Tunnel Times, Sydney convinces the trains to look cool and Bakerloo fears that Ernie's selling them off!
11	"Millie's Dream Day"	Ross Hastings	19 June 2006
Millie has won a dream day, but can the Underground cope without her?
12	"Mr Movie Jones"	Diane Redmond	20 June 2006
A case of mistaken identity as Mr. Movie Jones visits Sea Shell Bay.
13	"The Magician’s Assistant"	Diane Redmond	21 June 2006
Millie assists as Paris brings Maestro the magician to town.
14	"Running Late"	Lisa Akhurst	22 June 2006
Is Victoria heading for the scrapyard?
15	"Light at the End of the Tunnel"	Jan Page	23 June 2006
A tiny crack in the tunnel wall breaks open and Miss Relic sees her mummy again.
16	"The Wreck of Sea Shell Bay"	Diane Redmond	26 June 2006
Sam and Dan are seriously bad kids – but they get lucky.
17	"Pulling Together"	Jan Page	27 June 2006
Hammersmith and City have split loyalties while Victoria gets into football.
18	"Monster Mystery"	Jan Page	28 June 2006
A monster on the Underground? Not a good time for a practical joke.
19	"Bon Appetit"	Jan Page	29 June 2006
Millie cooks for the French chef, Marcel Le Magnifique, who arrives on Paris.
20	"A Change Is as Good as a Rest"	Diane Redmond	30 June 2006
The trains decide to swap lines, but Pippa doesn't hear the announcement.
21	"Elementary, my dear Bakerloo!"	Jan Page	13 November 2006
A jumble sale saves the nature reserve.
22	"The Magic Lamp"	Louise Kramskoy	14 November 2006
Is this a genie I see before me? A theatre prop spreads confusion.
23	"How Great The Art"	Ross Hastings	15 November 2006
Modern art – who wants it? How about a squashed wheelbarrow for Brooklyn?
24	"The Mayor's Visit"	Ross Hastings	16 November 2006
Mr. Rails gets the wrong end of the stick and the mayor gets stuck.
25	"Techno Trouble!"	Lisa Akhurst	17 November 2006
Osaka gives Jubilee some Japanese technology that is just too good.
26	"Snow Go"	Jan Page	23 December 2006
The Underground suffers from the wrong type of snow as Moscow visits.

== Broadcast ==
Channel 4 were originally slated to show the series, but after a lot of deliberation, the BBC bought the rights to the series in 2005. In its premier run, Underground Ernie would be broadcast at 9am on BBC Two, followed by a repeat on the CBeebies channel at 4:30pm that afternoon.

BBC Four showed an episode as part of their themed "Tube Night" on 18 March 2007.

== Merchandising ==
=== Toys ===
In November 2005, Halsall International Ltd. announced that they had secured the rights to produce merchandising linked to Underground Ernie. The products became on sale by September 2006, with a comprehensive range being available in 2007. The use of London Underground names and trains is a deliberate step to lead into merchandising suitable for children's gifts, the revenue from which was shared with Transport for London. Halsall International Ltd has, since 2009, stopped making 'Underground Ernie' models.

From 2007 up until 2009, Bachmann produced an HO scale Underground Ernie range, which was discontinued after the show was taken off air.

=== DVDs ===
Warner Vision International released four compilation DVDs of the show, which were later compiled into a boxset forming the complete first series. These releases are now out of print, and are very hard to find.

== Day Out with Underground Ernie ==
In 2008, one railway in Hampshire called the Eastleigh Lakeside Steam Railway secured the rights to hold children's days involving Underground Ernie, and held four Underground Ernie events a year called: Day Out with Underground Ernie.

Miniature versions of 'Jubilee' and 'Ernie 1' were created which passengers could ride behind, as well as meeting a larger than life version of Underground Ernie. The last Ernie event was held during late December 2009, ending in early January 2010. Day Out with Thomas took over where it left off.

=== Underground Ernie charity evenings ===
As well as Days Out with Ernie, in 2008 and 2009, two Underground Ernie fundraising events were held at the railway which were hosted by The Karen Ingram Foundation With over £3,500 raised on the night at the first event, which raised money for the hospital which cared and looked after Karen Ingram, for whom the events were in memory of. Co creator John Deery also attended the special charity evening, along with his family.

With Eastleigh no longer hosting events involving Days Out with Ernie, a final fundraiser was held at the railway in 2010, however this was not themed to Ernie, due to the railway no longer having the Ernie characters available to use.

== Theme song ==
The show's theme song, performed by members of The Wonder Stuff under the name "HRB Music", is called "The Importance of Being Ernie". This is a reference to Oscar Wilde's play The Importance of Being Earnest (Ernie is short for Ernest).

== Cancelled second season ==
A second series has been planned since 2006. Co-creator John Deery has been seeking a £5.5 million investment in a bid to break the US market, with the funds raised going towards making a second series. The plan is yet to materialise.

According to creative director Adam Batham, the strained relationship between 3D Films and Joella Productions prevented another series from being made.
