= Fetch the Vet =

British children's television series

- Created by: Gail Penston; Stephen Thraves
- Developed by: London Weekend Television
- Written by: Colin Davies; Andrew Brenner; Stephen Thraves
- Directed by: Chris Taylor
- Starring: John Gordon Sinclair; Floella Benjamin; David Holt; Janet James; Sophie Aldred (series 2); Rolf Harris (series 2)
- Composer: Phil Bush
- Country of origin: United Kingdom
- Original language: English
- No. of seasons: 2
- No. of episodes: 26

Production
- Executive producers: Mark Hall; Oliver Ellis
- Producer: Chris Bowden
- Running time: 10 minutes
- Production companies: Cosgrove Hall Films; Flextech Television; LWT

Original release
- Network: ITV (CITV)
- Release: 18 September 2000 – 23 December 2001

Fetch the Vet is a British stop motion children's television programme created by Gail Penston and Stephen Thraves. 26 episodes were produced by Cosgrove Hall Films, Flextech Television, and London Weekend Television for ITV's children's strand CITV from 18 September 2000 to 23 December 2001. The show concerned Tom Fetch, who lived in the countryside working as a vet and was respected by everyone because of his duties to help cure injured and/or sick animals.

== Episodes ==
=== Series 1 ===
No. overall	No. in series	Title	Written by	Original release date
1	1	"A Busy Day for Fetch"	Stephen Thraves	18 September 2000
Mitch the sheepdog has an ear infection and has to have an Elizabethan collar fitted, but when Trevor the goat finds himself dangling precariously over a cliff in a broken fence, Mitch "fetches the vet," and Fetch has a dangerous rescue operation to perform.
2	2	"Poor Mitch"	Stephen Thraves	25 September 2000
Fetch is judging the village's pet show when he is called away to the farm to attend to Mitch, who has been stung by a bee. When they return to the show, Violet Blush's cats are causing havoc and Mitch has to restore order.
3	3	"Froggatt in a Flap"	Stephen Thraves	2 October 2000
Lionel Froggatt's shop is due for an inspection by Fetch, but luckily, he is called away to an emergency on the duck pond and a crisis is averted.
4	4	"Carrots"	Andrew Brenner	9 October 2000
Fetch is at Whitecliff Farm and is having trouble with his car. There seems to be something stuck in the engine - and Trevor the goat has something stuck in his throat.
5	5	"Football Crazy"	Stephen Thraves	16 October 2000
It is the day of the big match, but Lionel Froggatt's television is broken. Iggy the iguana is a big football fan and very disappointed that he'll miss the game. But there may be a chance of Iggy watching the game with Fetch, with a little help from Joe's sports bag...
6	6	"Where's Fetch?"	Stephen Thraves	23 October 2000
The first of the new lambs are due to be born, and Fetch and George take a bet on when they will arrive. The ewes, Mandy and Betty, however, hold a couple of surprises in store for Fetch and George.
7	7	"Something's in the Air"	Andrew Brenner	30 October 2000
It is a beautiful day, and Fetch hopes for the afternoon off. Unfortunately, George sprains his ankle, and Fetch soon finds himself helping out with the sheep. An unexpected thunderstorm doesn't help, especially when it frightens poor old Trevor the goat, who runs off into all sorts of danger.
8	8	"The Duckhurst Monster"	Stephen Thraves	6 November 2000
Duckhurst is in line to win the Best Kept Village competition for the second time running. All is going well until Iggy the Iguana escapes from the pet shop and hides in the village pond. Fetch has his work cut out trying to rescue Iggy before the judges arrive. Just his luck that one of them is scared silly by iguanas!
9	9	"Heatwave"	Stephen Thraves	13 November 2000
It's a blisteringly hot day, and Trevor the goat is refusing to have his hooves clipped. The naughty goat escapes from Fetch's surgery and runs away to hide on the village green. When children Pippa, Joe and Lucy finally find him, it seems that the heat wave has made him poorly. Fetch needs a way to cool him down. Perhaps this is a job for Joe's mega-drencher water pistol?
10	10	"Parrot for Sale"	Andrew Brenner	20 November 2000
Lionel Froggatt, the pet shop owner, has finally decided to sell Columbus, his peevish parrot. The children are so upset at the prospect of never seeing Columbus again that they hatch a crazy plan to make Lionel keep him. Now if only they can convince Fetch to dress up as a parrot-hunting Hollywood movie director...
11	11	"Catch the Goat"	Stephen Thraves	27 November 2000
When Fetch finds Trevor wandering along the country lanes he has to bring him back to the surgery for the day. Trevor is soon up to mischief, and Kara, Fetch's nurse, thinks he might be happier in the fresh air. So that he won't run away, she ties him to a park bench, but the naughty goat wanders off again, taking the bench with him! Fetch and Kara look high and low, but they can't find Trevor anywhere. Where can he be?
12	12	"Violet Has an Accident"	Stephen Thraves	4 December 2000
Trevor the goat is in Violet's bad books when he eats her dress, but when she becomes lost, he gets a chance to help her.
13	13	"Mitch the Hero"	Andrew Brenner	11 December 2000
Mitch is in charge of the farm when he sees that a lamb has fallen over the cliff, and he gets some help from Fetch to rescue the animal.

=== Series 2 ===
No. overall	No. in series	Title	Written by	Original release date
14	1	"The Cat Burglar"	Stephen Thraves	18 May 2001
Violet's cats escape from the surgery on the very day that the local paper carries a warning about a cat thief who has been seen in the area.
15	2	"Snakes and Ladders"	Stephen Thraves	30 September 2001
Trevor the goat gets bitten by a snake.
16	3	"Fetch the Babysitter"	Stephen Thraves	7 October 2001
Fetch volunteers to look after Lionel's parrot for a night, but he has more trouble than he thought trying to get it to go to sleep.
17	4	"Violet Takes Over"	Andrew Brenner	21 October 2001
Kara is sent home with a cold, and Violet offers to take over.
18	5	"Columbus' Travels"	Stephen Thraves	28 October 2001
While on their way to a lecture about parrots, Columbus the pet shop parrot escapes from Fetch's car, causing trouble for Violet Blush in the process.
19	6	"Lionel's New Friend"	Stephen Thraves	4 November 2001
A joke with a trick spider goes awry when a real spider becomes involved.
20	7	"Iggy Gets Fit"	Stephen Thraves	11 November 2001
Iggy the iguana has become overweight, so Fetch recommends that Iggy start getting daily exercises.
21	8	"Fetch on TV"	Stephen Thraves	18 November 2001
Fetch and the villagers are going to be featured on the TV show "Village Vet," hosted by Ralph Morris (voiced by Rolf Harris). However, Ralph's encounters with the village animals do not go according to plan!
22	9	"Don't Tell Fetch"	Andrew Brenner	25 November 2001
It's Bonfire night, and everyone is out on the Green to enjoy the fireworks, but Violet's naughty cats get trapped under the unlit bonfire. Will someone realize in time?
23	10	"Emergency for Kara"	Stephen Thraves	2 December 2001
Mitch the sheepdog heroically rescues Kara's dog when it falls in an icy pond, but the effort proves to be too much for him.
24	11	"Blizzard"	Andrew Brenner	9 December 2001
A blizzard causes Violet and Fetch to get stuck in the snow, and at Whitecliff Farm, Mitch and Pippa go out to find a lamb that has gone missing.
25	12	"Surprise the Vet"	Andrew Brenner	16 December 2001
Kara and the villagers try to keep Fetch busy while they prepare a surprise for him.
26	13	"Happy Christmas, Duckhurst!"	Stephen Thraves	23 December 2001
Violet pays Lionel a visit on Christmas morning, and Fetch has to operate on Columbus the parrot.

== Broadcast ==
In 2001, Granada Enterprises announced that the series had been pre-sold in fourteen territories worldwide along with ITV for the UK.

The distribution rights to the series were sublicensed to Welsh-based animation studio Hoho Entertainment in June 2026. The series was digitally upscaled to HD for upload on YouTube and digital platforms.
