= Stephen Thraves =

British children's author

Stephen Thraves is a British children's author. The author of over 200 books, he is the creator of Fetch the Vet, a 26 episode animation for pre-school which aired on ITV between 1999 and 2001. He also wrote eight Famous Five adventure game books based on Enid Blyton's major series, published by Hodder & Stoughton in the 1980s. The first adventure game book of the series, The Wreckers' Tower Game, was published in October 1984.
