= John Deery =

British film director

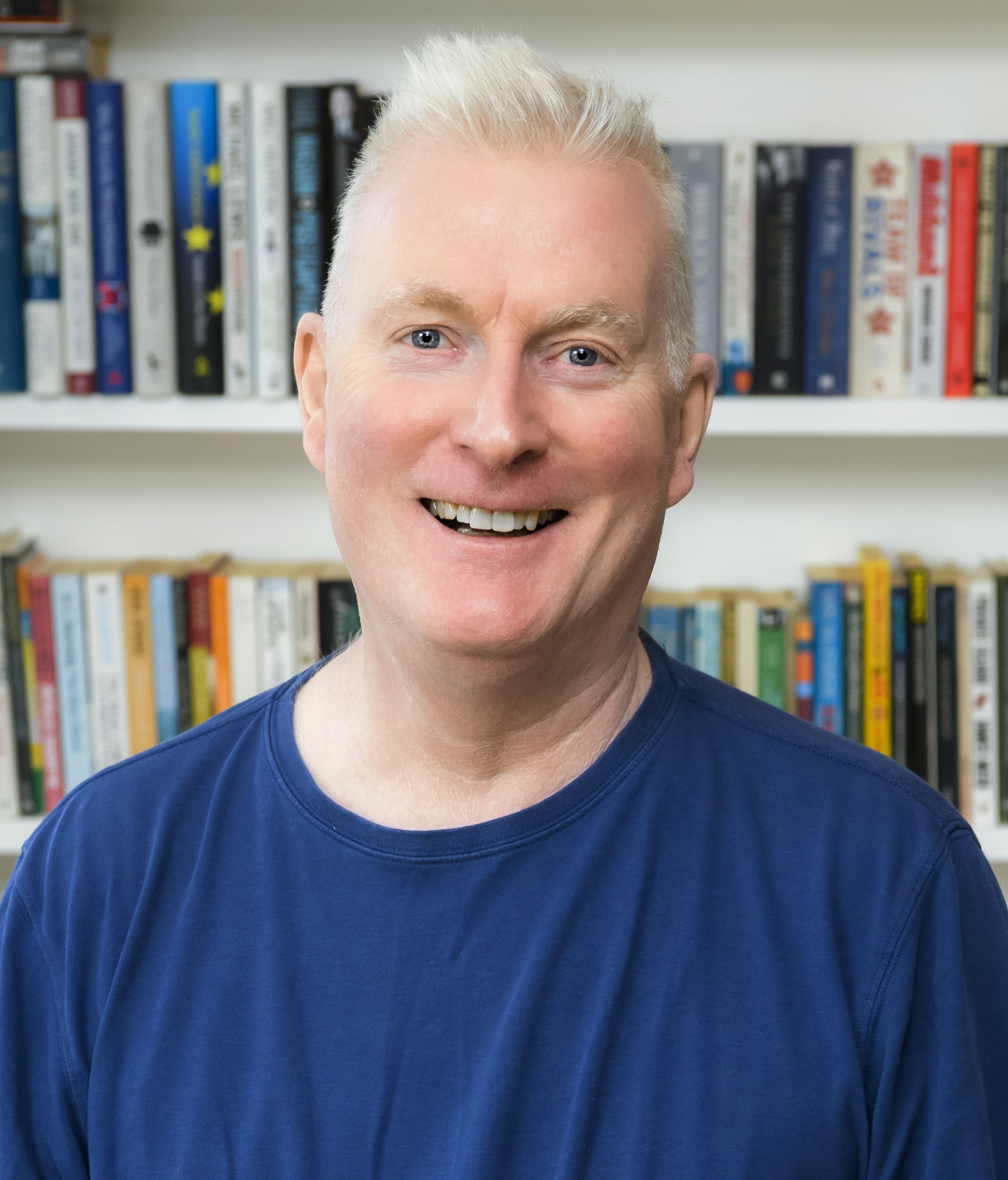
- Born: Birkenhead, Merseyside, England
- Education: Drama Studio London
- Occupations: Director, producer, screenwriter
- Years active: 1992–present
- Notable work: Conspiracy of Silence, Underground Ernie, Fat Friends
- Television: BBC, ITV
- Awards: See below

John Deery is a British-Irish award-winning director, producer and screenwriter.

== Early life ==
Born in Birkenhead, Merseyside, across the River Mersey from Liverpool, he was brought up in County Donegal and Birkenhead. His parents and family are all from Donegal and has dual citizenship in Ireland and the UK. Like many other directors, he started out as an actor, training at the Drama Studio London. In between acting jobs, he was a runner on commercials with some of the UK's top commercial directors. He then became an assistant director before attending the National Film & Television School's Short Course Unit for Directors.

== Career ==
=== Political film ===
One of Deery's other passions is politics. He worked extensively with the film and commercials director, Hugh Hudson, during the Labour Party General Election campaign of 1992. After graduating from the National Film and Television School in 1996, Deery was commissioned by the Labour Party to write and direct a film for the Labour Party called The Road to the Manifesto which launched Labour's 1997 General Election campaign. The film was a success, not only for its political message, but also for its theme song, "Things Can Only Get Better", which went on to become Labour's Election anthem. Deery made many other films for the Labour Party as well as films for trade unions, charities and multi-national companies including PwC, Unilever, Andersen Consulting, NHS, Accenture and many more.

=== Conspiracy of Silence ===
Coming from an Irish-Catholic background, Deery believed that enforced celibacy was a 'time bomb waiting to go off' in the Catholic Church and began researching his first feature film, Conspiracy of Silence, which he wrote and directed. Cast includes: Academy Award-winner Brenda Fricker, Hugh Bonneville, Chris O'Dowd, John Lynch, Jonathan Forbes, Jason Barry, Sean McGinley, Fintan McKeown, Jim Norton and Hugh Quarshie.

The screenplay was developed at the Sundance Screenwriters' Lab in Utah and won the Hartley-Merrill International Screenwriting Award presented to Deery at the Cannes Film Festival in 2001. The film won many international awards including the U.S. National Board of Review of Motion Pictures' Freedom of Expression Award in 2004, which it shared with Michael Moore's Fahrenheit 9/11 and Mel Gibson's The Passion of the Christ. Deery was also nominated for Best Film Director at the Irish Film & Television Academy Awards in 2003.

The film was screened at many film festivals in 2003 in Competition and/or Official Selection including Taormina (Italy), Rome, Moscow, Opening Night film at the Galway Film Fleadh, Ireland, Montreal Film Festival, Hamburg Film Festival, Warsaw Film Festival where it won a Special Jury Award, Dinard Festival of British Cinema, France, and the American Film Institute (AFI) Festival in Los Angeles.

The film was also screened in September 2010, two days before Pope Benedict XVI's visit to the UK, at the Odeon West End in London's Leicester Square, where it formed the backdrop to a public debate about priestly celibacy in the Roman Catholic Church. Speakers included the Bishop of Nottingham, comedian Frank Skinner and Baroness Helena Kennedy QC.

Conspiracy of Silence was re-launched at the Berlin International Film Festival in February 2014 by a new US boutique sales company, Angel Grace Films, headed by Michael Fister. It was digitally remastered in 2023 and re-released on VOD and streaming services, including Amazon Prime and Apple TV worldwide by Bohemia Media.

=== Television ===
Since Conspiracy of Silence, Deery has also directed several big dramas for television including If I Had You, a 2-hour single film for ITV1, starring Sarah Parish and Paul McGann which was screened in 2006. He also directed two 90-minute specials of the hit UK comedy/drama series, Fat Friends starring James Corden, Ruth Jones and Alison Steadman.

=== Underground Ernie ===
Alongside his film and television drama career, Deery founded Joella Productions in 2002, an animation production company. He co-created with Sid Rainey the animated series Underground Ernie. Underground Ernie is a children's CGI animation series, based around a fictional underground railway service called 'International Station' which is run by station supervisor, Ernie, played by Gary Lineker. It aired on BBC CBeebies and BBC Two in the UK between June 2006 and December 2009 and achieved some of the highest viewing figures for the channel.

=== Future projects ===
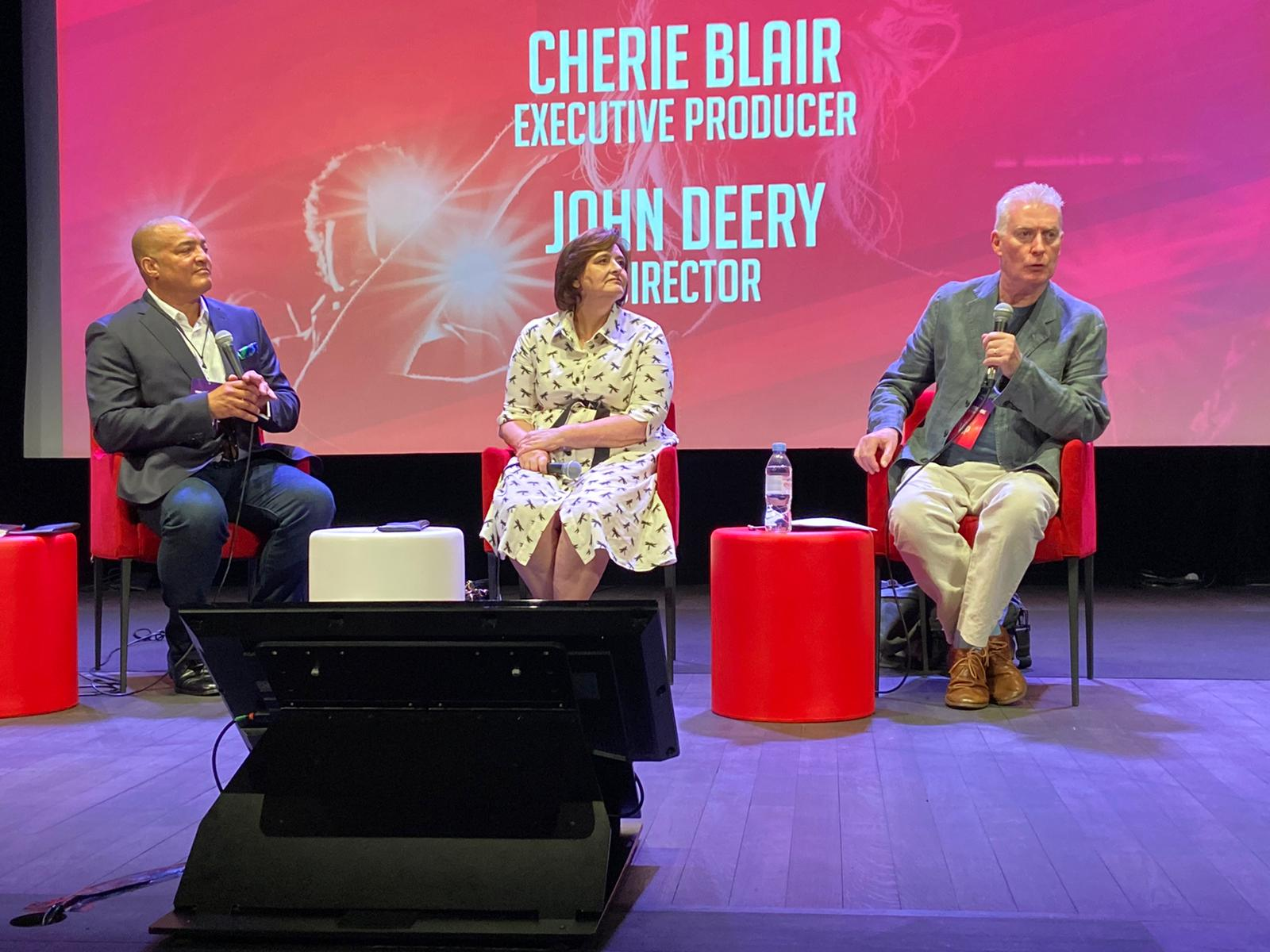
John Deery and Cherie Blair at the Monaco Streaming Film Festival in June 2022

Deery has developed a film slate for his own production company Joejack Entertainment, including a feature film drama called 'The Rock Pile' set in Jerusalem, which he is producing with Cherie Blair.

== Filmography ==
Year(s)	Title	Role(s)	Description
2003	Conspiracy of Silence	Director, Writer & Producer	Theatrical film (digital release in 2023)
2004	Fat Friends	Director	2 episodes of television series: Eat Your Heart Out; Enough to go Around
2005	The Brief	Director	1 episode of television series: Lack of Affect
2006	If I Had You	Director	Television film
2007	Underground Ernie	Executive Producer	26-part children's series: Enough to go Around; A Change Is as Good as a Rest; Bon Appetit; Brooklyn and Rocky Two-Shoes; Catnapped; Caught Purple Handed; Cover Story; Elementary My Dear Bakerloo; Ernie's Big Trip; Finders Keepers; How Great the Art; Light at the End of the Tunnel; Millie's Daydream; Monster Mystery; Mr Movie Jones; Mr Rails Never Fails; Pop Decoy; Pulling Together; Running Late; Sir Clunkalot; Summer Breeze; Techno Trouble; The Magic Lamp; The Magician's Assistant; The Mayor's Visit; The Wreck of Sea Shell Bay

== Awards and nominations ==
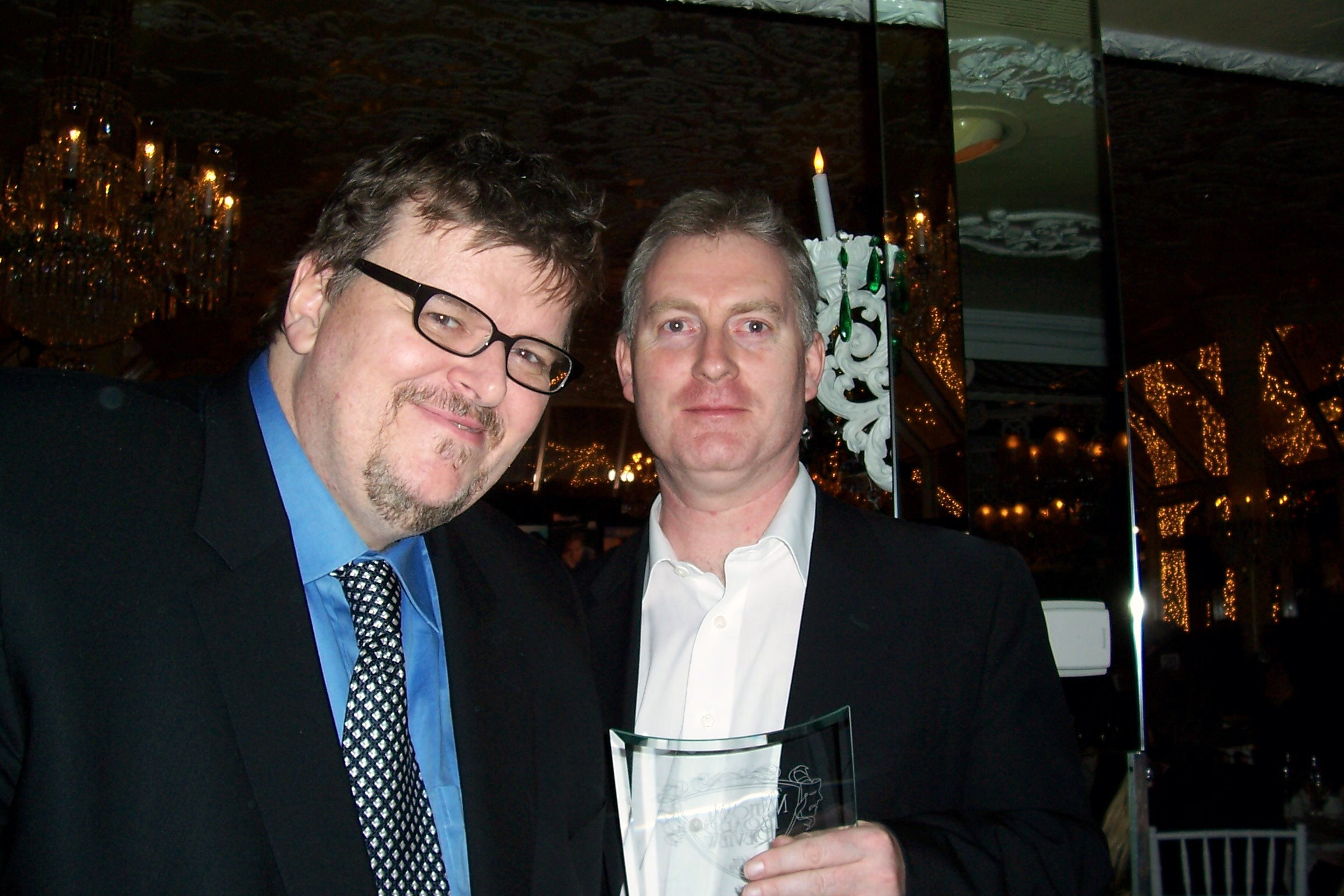
Deery with Michael Moore in 2005 after accepting NBR award

Year	Award	Category	Title	Result
2001	Hartley-Merrill	International Screenwriting Award	Conspiracy of Silence	Won
2001	Sundance Screenwriters' Lab	Fellowship	Conspiracy of Silence	Won
2003	Dinard British Film Festival	Golden Hitchcock	Conspiracy of Silence	Nominated
2003	Irish Film and Television Awards	Best Film Director	Conspiracy of Silence	Nominated
2003	Warsaw International Film Festival	Special Mention	Conspiracy of Silence	Won
2004	National Board of Review	Freedom of Expression Award	Conspiracy of Silence	Won
