= Sid Rainey =

Irish musician and producer (born 1968)

- Born: Sidney Rainey; 1968 (age 57–58); Sligo, Ireland
- Occupations: Musician, producer

Sidney Rainey (born 1968) is an Irish musician and producer. He is known for co-creating the animated series Underground Ernie with John Deery and his work as a musician and comedy writer.

== Compulsion ==
Rainey first came to prominence as the bass player for Irish punk band Compulsion in 1990.

== Television production ==
Rainey has been involved in film and television in the U.K. for almost fifteen years creating animated children's television, comedy panel quiz shows, sit-coms, talk-based music interview shows, feature films and short films. With John Deery, he co-created & executive produced the hit cartoon series Underground Ernie which was broadcast on the BBC and in various territories around the world.

He also has done stand-up comedy and was the bassist for the post punk band Compulsion and was signed to One Little Indian UK/Interscope Records US.

In August 2015, Sid directed a W.B. Yeats play The Resurrection. He is currently finishing a series of film and television projects, a stage play and a new animated TV series.

Rainey recently wrote and directed a music video for recording artist Dean Gurrie for his single Give Me A Chance in 2016 and Dean's second music video New Beginnings, to be released later this year.

Professional Experience and Significant Achievements

Creating Television and Film projects (present) - Creating comedy panel quiz shows, sit coms, feature films and talk-based music interview shows.

Co-creator of BBC2/CBeebies Underground Ernie - (2006-2007)

Created the concept, story, characters, and character designs for this British animated children's television series, which ran 2006-2007 twice a day for five days a week. Oversaw script development and story outlines with renowned children's writer Jan Page. Secured Gary Lineker, Tim Whitnall, Janet Brown, Chris Jarvis, Howard Ward and Emma Weaver for voice-overs. Created and set up Joella Productions which financed and produced the 26 episodes,

Achievements - Underground Ernie was officially declared the most watched children's series on BBC during the 2006-2007 period.

Freelance writer for Ealing Studios, Tiger Aspect, Channel 4 - (2001-2006)

The company created and produced a popular animated series, Underground Ernie, about a group of talking trains and their human colleagues, Ernie, Millie and Mr Rails. Underground Ernie was first shown on CBeebies and BBC2 in 2006 and has quickly become a popular hit.
