= Daytime Emmy Award for Outstanding Directing For A Children's Series =

Former television award

The Daytime Emmy Award for Outstanding Directing For A Children's Series was an Emmy award honoring direction in children's television programming. Since 1979, direction in children's series and specials competed in the same category. However, by the nineties, separate categories were created for the two mediums. In November 2021, it was announced that all Daytime Emmy categories honoring children's programming will be retired in favor of a separate Children's & Family Emmy Awards ceremony that will be held starting in 2022.

== Winners and Nominees ==
Winners in bold. For "Individual Achievement" categories, only nominees relevant to this page are listed.

=== Outstanding Individual Achievement in Children's Programming ===
==== 1970s ====
1979

- **Larry Elikann** - ABC Afterschool Special ("Mom and Dad Can't Hear Me") (ABC)

==== 1980s ====
1980

- **Anthony Lover** - ABC Afterschool Special ("The Late Great Me! Story of a Teenage Alcoholic") (ABC)
- **Arthur Allan Seidelman** - ABC Afterschool Special ("Which Mother Is Mine?") (ABC)
- J. Philip Miller - 3-2-1 Contact ("The Bloodhound Gang") (PBS)
- Joseph Consentino - Big Blue Marble ("Divorce") (SYN)
- Tom Trbovich - Hot Hero Sandwich ("Episode 4") (NBC)

1981

- **John Herzfeld** - ABC Afterschool Special ("Stoned") (ABC)
- Don Roy King - Kids Are People Too (ABC)

=== Outstanding Individual Direction in Children's Programming ===
==== 1980s ====
1982

- **Arthur Allan Seidelman** - ABC Afterschool Special ("She Drinks a Little") (ABC)
- Jeff Bleckner - ABC Afterschool Special ("Daddy, I'm Their Mama Now") (ABC)
- Jim Hirschfeld - Captain Kangaroo (CBS)

1983

- **Sharron Miller** - ABC Afterschool Special ("The Woman Who Willed a Miracle") (ABC)
- Jim Hirschfeld - Captain Kangaroo (CBS)
- Jon Stone - Sesame Street (PBS)

1984

- **Robert Mandel** - ABC Afterschool Special ("Andrea's Story: A Hitchhiking Tragedy") (ABC)
- Harry Harris - ABC Afterschool Special ("Have You Ever Been Ashamed of Your Parents?") (ABC)
- Claudia Weill - ABC Afterschool Special ("The Great Love Experiment") (ABC)
- Marc Daniels - ABC Weekend Special ("All the Money in the World") (ABC)

=== Outstanding Directing in Children's Programming ===
==== 1980s ====
1985

- **Joan Darling** - ABC Afterschool Special ("Mom's on Strike") (ABC)
- Henry Winkler - CBS Schoolbreak Special ("All the Kids Do It") (CBS)
- Jon Stone - Sesame Street (PBS)

1986

- **Martin Sheen** - CBS Schoolbreak Special ("Babies Having Babies") (CBS)
- Gary Halvorson - Kids Incorporated (SYN)
- Lisa Simon - Sesame Street (PBS)
- Emily Squires - Sesame Street (PBS)
- Jon Stone - Sesame Street (PBS)

1987

- **Dan F. Smith** - Square One Television (PBS)
- Kevin Hooks - ABC Afterschool Special ("Teen Father") (ABC)
- Stephen R. Johnson - Pee-wee's Playhouse (CBS)
- Jon Stone, Emily Squires, Lisa Simon - Sesame Street (PBS)

1988

- **Jeffrey D. Brown** - CBS Schoolbreak Special ("What If I'm Gay?") (CBS)
- Ozzie Alfonso - 3-2-1 Contact (PBS)
- Kevin Hooks - ABC Afterschool Specials ("Class Act: A Teacher's Story") (ABC)
- Wayne Orr and Paul Reubens - Pee-wee's Playhouse (CBS)
- Dan F. Smith - Square One TV (PBS)

=== Special Class Directing ===
==== 1980s ====
1989

- Sandy Smolan - ABC Afterschool Special ("Taking a Stand") (ABC)
- Ron Underwood, John Clark Matthews - ABC Weekend Special ("Runaway Ralph") (ABC)
- Jesús Salvador Treviño - CBS Schoolbreak Special ("Gangs") (CBS)
- Michael Gargiulo - All-American Thanksgiving Parade (CBS)
- Joel Aronowitz - CBS Cotton Bowl Parade (CBS)
- Dick Schneider - Macy's Thanksgiving Day Parade (NBC)

=== Outstanding Achievement in Directing - Special Class ===
==== 1990s ====
1990

- **Victoria Hochberg** - Sweet 15 (PBS)
- Diane Keaton - CBS Schoolbreak Special ("The Girl with the Crazy Brother") (CBS)
- Dick Schneider - Macy's Thanksgiving Day Parade (NBC)
- Helen Whitney - ABC Afterschool Special ("A Town's Revenge") (ABC)
- Jerry Evans and Martin Pasetta - Trial by Jury (SYN)

1991

- **Kristoffer Tabori** - ABC Afterschool Special ("The Perfect Date") (ABC)
- Piers Haggard - Back Home (Disney Channel)
- Daniel Taplitz - Lifestories: Families in Crisis ("Gunplay: The Last Day in the Life of Brian Darling") (HBO)
- Thomas G. Smith and John Clark Matthews - ABC Weekend Special ("Ralph S. Mouse") (ABC)
- Al Waxman - CBS Schoolbreak Special ("Maggie's Secret") (CBS)
- Timothy Regler - The People's Court (SYN)
- Dick Schneider - Macy's Thanksgiving Day Parade (NBC)
- Bernie Hargis - Winds of Freedom (ABC)
- Susan Rohrer - CBS Schoolbreak Special ("The Emancipation of Lizzie Stern") (CBS)

=== Outstanding Directing in a Children's Special ===
==== 1990s ====
1992

- **David Cobham** - Woof! (Disney Channel)
- Ozzie Alfonso - 3-2-1 Contact ("Secrets of the Code") (PBS)
- Gordon Edelstein - CBS Schoolbreak Special ("Abby, My Love") (CBS)
- Michael Rubbo - Vincent and Me (Disney Channel)
- David J. Eagle - CBS Schoolbreak Special ("Two Teens and a Baby") (CBS)

1993

- **László Pal** - Journey to Spirit Island (Disney Channel)
- Savage Steve Holland - ABC Weekend Specials ("CityKids") (ABC)
- Juan José Campanella - Lifestories: Families in Crisis ("Public Law 106: The Becky Bell Story") (HBO)
- John Watkin and Eamon Harrington - ABC Afterschool Specials ("Shades of a Single Protein") (ABC)
- Strathford Hamilton - CBS Schoolbreak Special ("Please, God, I'm Only Seventeen") (CBS)

1994

- **Hank Saroyan** - ABC Weekend Special ("William Saroyan's The Parsley Garden") (ABC)
- Anne Wheeler - The Comic Book Christmas Caper (Disney Channel)
- Lee Shallat Chemel - CBS Schoolbreak Special ("Other Mothers") (CBS)
- Juan José Campanella - Lifestories: Families in Crisis ("Dead Drunk: The Kevin Tunell Story") (HBO)
- Catherine Cyran - White Wolves: A Cry in the Wild II (Disney Channel)

1995

- **Juan José Campanella** - Lifestories: Families in Crisis ("A Child Betrayed: The Calvin Mire Story") (HBO)
- Jesús Salvador Treviño - Lifestories: Families in Crisis ("POWER: The Eddie Matos Story") (HBO)
- David J. Eagle - CBS Schoolbreak Special ("The Writing on the Wall") (CBS)
- David Burton Morris - Lifestories: Families in Crisis ("A Body to Die for: The Aaron Henry Story") (HBO)

1996

- **John Watkin** and **Eamon Harrington** - ABC Afterschool Special ("Positive: A Journey Into AIDS") (ABC)
- Gina Prince-Bythewood - CBS Schoolbreak Special ("What About Your Friends") (CBS)
- Juan José Campanella - CBS Schoolbreak Special ("Stand Up") (CBS)
- Michael Ryan and Ellen Stokes - Eagle Scout: The Story of Henry Nicols (HBO)
- Chuck Blore - The New Adventures of Mother Goose (SYN)

1997

- **Juan José Campanella** - Lifestories: Families in Crisis ("Someone Had to be Benny") (HBO)
- Victor Du Bois - ABC Afterschool Special ("Too Soon For Jeff") (ABC)
- John Watkin and Eamon Harrington - ABC Afterschool Specials ("Miracle at Trapper Creek") (ABC)
- Dianah Wynter - ABC Afterschool Special ("Daddy's Girl") (ABC)
- Emily Squires - Elmo Saves Christmas (PBS)
- Stephen Williams - Shadow Zone: The Undead Express (Showtime)

1998

- **Carlyle Kyzer**, **Greg Poschman**, and **Krysia Carter-Giez** - Letters from Africa (Disney Channel)
- William A. Whiteford - Bong & Donnell (HBO)
- Vic Sarin - In His Father's Shoes (Showtime)

1999

- **Søren Kragh-Jacobsen** - The Island on Bird Street (Showtime)
- George Miller - In the Doghouse (Showtime)
- Stuart Margolin - The Sweetest Gift (Showtime)
- Rick Duffield - Wishbone's Dog Days of the West (Showtime)

==== 2000s ====
2000

- **Donna Deitch** - The Devil's Arithmetic (Showtime)
- Richard Mozer - Mary Cassatt: An American Impressionist (HBO)
- Clement Virgo - The Planet of Junior Brown (Showtime)
- Vic Sarin - Sea People (Showtime)
- Helen Shaver - Summer's End (Showtime)

2001

- **Paul A. Kaufman** - Run the Wild Fields (Showtime)
- Peter Masterson - Mermaid (Showtime)
- Ernest Thompson - Out of Time (Showtime)
- Bradley Wigor - The Sandy Bottom Orchestra (Showtime)
- Ivan Passer - The Wishing Tree (Showtime)

2002

- **Adam Arkin** - My Louisiana Sky (Showtime)
- Eric Stoltz - My Horrible Year! (Showtime)
- Bruce Davison - Off Season (Showtime)
- Richard Friedenberg - Snow in August (Showtime)

2003

- **Guy Ferland** - Bang Bang You're Dead (Showtime)
- Danny Glover - Just a Dream (Showtime)
- Gregory Hines - The Red Sneakers (Showtime)

=== Outstanding Directing in a Children/Youth/Family Special ===
==== 2000s ====
2004

- **Salma Hayek** - The Maldonado Miracle (Showtime)
- Paul Johansson - The Incredible Mrs. Ritchie (Showtime)

=== Outstanding Directing in a Children's Series ===
==== 1980s ====
1989

- **Ozzie Alfonso** - 3-2-1 Contact (PBS)
- **Matthew Diamond** - Shining Time Station (PBS)
- Dana Calderwood - Double Dare (SYN)
- Joseph Behar - Fun House (SYN)

==== 1990s ====
1990

- **Mike Gargiulo** and **Charles S. Dubin** - Square One Television (PBS)
- John Paragon and Paul Reubens - Pee-wee's Playhouse (CBS)
- Dean Parisot - Reading Rainbow ("Ludlow Laughs") (PBS)
- Team - Sesame Street (PBS)
- Gregory Lehane - Shining Time Station ("Promises, Promises") (PBS)

1991

- **Brian Henson** and **Michael Kerrigan** - Jim Henson's Mother Goose Stories (Disney Channel)
- John Paragon and Paul Reubens - Pee-wee's Playhouse (CBS)
- Team - Reading Rainbow (PBS)
- Team - Sesame Street (PBS)

1992

- **Team** - Reading Rainbow (PBS)
- Team - Sesame Street (PBS)
- Gregory Lehane - Shining Time Station (PBS)
- Team - Square One Television (PBS)

1993

- **Ed Wiseman** and **Mark Mannucci** - Reading Rainbow (PBS)
- Gary Halvorson - Adventures in Wonderland (Disney Channel)
- Team - The All-New Mickey Mouse Club (Disney Channel)
- Team - Sesame Street (PBS)
- Dana Calderwood - Where in the World Is Carmen Sandiego? (PBS)

1994

- **Ed Wiseman** and **Mark Mannucci** - Reading Rainbow (PBS)
- Lee Bernhardi - The All-New Mickey Mouse Club (Disney Channel)
- Dana Calderwood - Where in the World Is Carmen Sandiego? (PBS)
- Team - Sesame Street (PBS)
- Jim Rowley and Bruce Deck - Barney & Friends (PBS)

1995

- **Team** - Sesame Street (PBS)
- Gary Halvorson and David Grossman - Adventures in Wonderland (Disney Channel)
- Hugh Martin - Where in the World Is Carmen Sandiego? (PBS)
- Ed Wiseman and Mark Mannucci - Reading Rainbow (PBS)
- Jay Dubin - Beakman's World (CBS)

1996

- **Team** - Adventures in Wonderland (Disney Channel)
- Team - Reading Rainbow (PBS)
- Andrew Carl Wilk - Really Wild Animals (CBS)
- Team - Sesame Street (PBS)
- Tom Trbovich and Ed Wiseman - The Puzzle Place (PBS)
- Hugh Martin - Where in the World Is Carmen Sandiego? (PBS)

1997

- **Team** - Bill Nye the Science Guy (PBS)
- Jay Dubin - Beakman's World (CBS)
- Team - Reading Rainbow (PBS)
- Team - Sesame Street (PBS)
- David Turner - Where in the World Is Carmen Sandiego? (PBS)

1998

- **Team** - Sesame Street (PBS)
- Jay Dubin - Beakman's World (CBS)
- Team - Bill Nye the Science Guy (PBS)
- Team - Reading Rainbow (PBS)
- David Turner - Where in the World Is Carmen Sandiego? (PBS)

1999

- **Michael Gross** and **Darrell Suto** - Bill Nye the Science Guy (SYN)
- Team - Barney & Friends (PBS)
- Alan Zdinak and Paul Zehrer - Blue's Clues (Nickelodeon)
- Team - Reading Rainbow (PBS)
- Team - Sesame Street (PBS)

==== 2000s ====
2000

- **Team** - Bear in the Big Blue House (Disney Channel)
- Team - Blue's Clues (Nickelodeon)
- Team - Bill Nye, the Science Guy (SYN)
- Team - Sesame Street (PBS)
- Jesse Collins - Zoboomafoo (PBS)

2001

- **Jacques Laberge** and **Pierre Roy** - Zoboomafoo (PBS)
- Team - Blue's Clues (Nickelodeon)
- Team - Reading Rainbow (PBS)
- Team - Sesame Street (PBS)

2002

- **Mitchell Kriegman** and **Dean Gordon** - The Book of Pooh (Disney Channel)
- **Team** - Sesame Street (PBS)
- Team - Blue's Clues (Nickelodeon)
- Ed Wiseman - Reading Rainbow (PBS)
- Bob Comiskey - Zoom (PBS)

2003

- **Mitchell Kriegman** and **Dean Gordon** - Bear in the Big Blue House (Disney Channel)
- Team - Between the Lions (PBS)
- Team - Blue's Clues (Nickelodeon)
- Ed Wiseman - Reading Rainbow (PBS)
- Team - Sesame Street (PBS)

2004

- **Team** - Sesame Street (PBS)
- Team - Bear in the Big Blue House (Disney Channel)
- Team - Between the Lions (PBS)
- Richard A. Fernandes and Maureen Thorp - Out of the Box (Disney Channel)

2005

- **Team** - Sesame Street (PBS)
- Team - Blue's Clues (Nickelodeon)
- Team - The Book of Pooh (Disney Channel)
- Bob Comiskey - Zoom (PBS)

2006

- **Bob Comiskey** - Zoom (PBS)
- Fred Holmes and Jim Rowley - Barney & Friends (PBS)
- Team - Sesame Street (PBS)

2007

- **Team** - Sesame Street (PBS)
- Team - It's a Big Big World (PBS)
- Magnús Scheving and Jonathan Judge - LazyTown (Nickelodeon)

2008

- **Dorothy Dickie** - Design Squad (PBS)
- Team - Sesame Street (PBS)
- Team - Blue's Room (Nickelodeon)

2009

- **Team** - Sesame Street (PBS)
- Gary Halvorson - From the Top at Carnegie Hall (PBS)

==== 2010s ====
2010

- **Team** - Sesame Street (PBS)
- Dorothy Dickie - Design Squad (PBS)
- Team - The Electric Company (PBS)

2011

- **Team** - Sesame Street (PBS)
- Erren Gottlieb and James McKenna - Biz Kid$ (PBS)
- Ryan McFaul - The Electric Company (PBS)

2012

- **Team** - Sesame Street (PBS)
- Dorothy Dickie - Design Squad (PBS)
- Ryan McFaul - The Electric Company (PBS)
- Neill Fearnley and Ken Friss - R.L. Stine's The Haunting Hour (Hub Network)

2013

- **Team** - Sesame Street (PBS)
- Team - R.L. Stine's The Haunting Hour (Hub Network)

2014

- **Team** - Sesame Street (PBS)
- Team - R.L. Stine's The Haunting Hour (Hub Network)
- Ken Friss and James Head - Spooksville (Hub Network)

2015

- **J.J. Johnson** - Odd Squad (PBS)
- J.J. Johnson - Annedroids (Amazon)
- J.J. Johnson - Dino Dan: Trek’s Adventures (Nickelodeon)
- Team - R.L. Stine's The Haunting Hour (Discovery Family)

2016

- **Team** - Odd Squad (PBS)
- J.J. Johnson and Steve Scaini - Annedroids (Amazon)
- Jason deVilliers, Christian Jacobs, and Hugh Martin - Mutt & Stuff (Nickelodeon)
- Team - Sesame Street (PBS)
- Scott Schultz - Yo Gabba Gabba! (Nickelodeon)

2017

- **Team** - Sesame Street (HBO)
- J.J. Johnson - Dino Dan: Trek’s Adventures (Nickelodeon)
- Team - Mutt & Stuff (Nickelodeon)
- Team - Odd Squad (PBS)
- Richard Rotter - Terrific Trucks Save Christmas (Sprout)

2018

- **Team** - Free Rein (Netflix)
- Julie’s Greenroom (Netflix)
- Odd Squad (PBS)
- Sesame Street (HBO)
- Top Chef Junior (Universal Kids)
