= List of programs broadcast by Family Channel (Canada) =

This is a list of television series broadcast by the Family Channel.

== Final programming ==
=== Original programming ===
==== Live-action series ====
- Are You Afraid of the Dark?
- Backstage
- Beyond Black Beauty
- Degrassi: Next Class
- The Fabulous Show with Fay and Fluffy
- Life with Derek (2006–16; reruns)

==== Animated series ====
- Badjelly (January 12 – October 22, 2025)
- Dorg Van Dango (August 1, 2020−October 22, 2025)
- Lana Longbeard (January 12, 2025 – October 22, 2025)
- Lucas the Spider (2021–October 22, 2025)
- Open Season: Call of Nature (November 3, 2023 – October 22, 2025)
- Slugterra: Ascension
- Summer Memories (2022 – October 22, 2025)
- Saving Me (March 15, 2023 – October 22, 2025)

=== Acquired programming ===
==== Live-action series ====
- Born to Spy
- The Bureau of Magical Things (May 4, 2020 – October 22, 2025)
- The Canterville Ghost
- Degrassi Junior High
- Dwight in Shining Armor (January 18, 2021 – October 22, 2025)
- Family Matters (July 12, 2021)
- Gilmore Girls (May 30, 2016 ‒ October 22, 2025)
- The Goldbergs (September 5, 2023 ‒ 2025)
- Goosebumps
- Just Add Magic (April 20, 2019 – October 22, 2025)
- Lockdown (July 3, 2020 – October 22, 2025)

==== Reality series ====
- Backyard Blowout
- Create the Escape
- Domino Masters (2022 – October 22, 2025)

==== Animated series ====
- Boy Girl Dog Cat Mouse Cheese (2020 – October 22, 2025)
- Caillou (2018(?); August 16, 2021 – October 22, 2025)
- Care Bears: Unlock the Magic
- Carmen Sandiego (2023 – October 22, 2025)
- Denis and Me
- Jade Armor (September 8, 2023 – October 22, 2025)
- Johnny Test
- LEGO DreamZzz (2023 – October 22, 2025)
- LEGO Friends: The Next Chapter (April 7, 2023 – October 22, 2025)
- Miraculous: Tales of Ladybug & Cat Noir (October 10, 2016 – October 22, 2025)
- Sailor Moon Crystal (November 11, 2024 – 2025)
- Shasha & Milo (2023 – October 22, 2025)
- The Smurfs
- Strawberry Shortcake: Berry in the Big City
- Tara Duncan (2023 – October 22, 2025)

=== Programming from DreamWorks Animation ===
==== Animated series ====
- Abominable and the Invisible City (October 21, 2022 – October 22, 2025)
- The Boss Baby: Back in Business (March 2, 2020 – October 22, 2025)
- DreamWorks Dragons (August 12, 2017 – October 22, 2025)
- The Epic Tales of Captain Underpants (April 19, 2021 – October 22, 2025)
- Spirit Riding Free (May 18, 2019 – October 22, 2025)
- Trolls: The Beat Goes On! (May 4, 2020 – October 22, 2025)

== Former programming ==
=== Original programming ===
==== Live-action series ====
- African Skies (1992–97)
- Anna Banana (1994–97)
- Audubon's Animal Adventures (1997–99)
- Bajillionaires
- Baxter
- BB & Jennifer (1990–92)
- The Big Garage (1995–2001)
- Bobobobs (1989–92)
- Connor Undercover
- Debra!
- Fabulicious Day (1996–97)
- Gaming Show (In My Parents' Garage)
- Hello Mrs. Cherrywinkle (February 3, 1997 – 2001)
- In a Heartbeat (2000–04)
- Kingdom Adventure (1990–92)
- The Latest Buzz
- Lost & Found Music Studios
- Massive Monster Mayhem
- Mentors
- MusiQuest (1990–91)
- Naturally, Sadie (2005–12)
- Nilus the Sandman (1996–99)
- OMG!
- Overruled!
- Playdate
- Radio Free Roscoe (2004–08)
- Raising Expectations
- Really Me
- Something Else (2003–08)
- Take Off (1991–95)
- Try It
- UMIGO
- We are Savvy
- What's Up Warthogs!
- Wingin' It

==== Animated series ====
- The Busy World of Richard Scarry (January 1, 1994 – 2001)
- Chip and Potato
- The Deep
- Fangbone!
- Franklin (1997–2005)
- Franny's Feet (2004–14)
- Henry's World (2002–13)
- Hoze Houndz (1999–2009)
- Justin Time
- Katie and Orbie (1994–2006)
- King
- Kleo the Misfit Unicorn (1997–99)
- The Legend of White Fang (1992–94)
- The Little Lulu Show (1998–2003)
- The Magical Adventures of Quasimodo (1996–99)
- Mighty Mike
- The Neverending Story (1995–98)
- Papa Beaver's Storytime
- Polly Pocket
- Rev & Roll
- Ripley's Believe It or Not!: The Animated Series (1999–2001; 2003–04)
- The Secret World of Benjamin Bear (2004–14)
- Slugterra
- Stella and Sam

=== Acquired programming ===
==== Programming from Disney ====
===== Live-action series =====
- 8 Simple Rules (2005–07)
- A.N.T. Farm
- Aaron Stone
- Adventures in Wonderland (1992–98)
- Austin & Ally
- Bear in the Big Blue House (2006–07)
- Bill Nye the Science Guy (1998–2001)
- Blossom (1998–2000)
- The Book of Pooh (2001–03)
- Boy Meets World (2002–06)
- The Brendan Leonard Show
- Brotherly Love (2004–06)
- Bug Juice (1998–2002)
- Bunnytown
- Cory in the House (2007–10; 2012–13)
- Crash & Bernstein
- Dinosaurs (1998–2001)
- Dog with a Blog
- Dumbo's Circus (1988–97)
- Even Stevens (2001–09)
- Flash Forward (1995–2000)
- Girl Meets World
- Going Wild with Jeff Corwin (1998–99)
- Good Luck Charlie
- Hannah Montana (2007–13)
- Honey, I Shrunk the Kids: The TV Show (1999–2004)
- I Didn't Do It
- I'm in the Band
- Imagination Movers
- The Jersey (2000–03)
- Johnny and the Sprites
- Jonas (2009–11)
- K.C. Undercover
- Kicked Out
- Life with Bonnie
- Liv and Maddie
- Lizzie McGuire (2001–05)
- Mad Libs (1999–2000)
- Malcolm in the Middle (2017)
- The Mickey Mouse Club
- Mousercise (1988–95)
- Muppets Tonight (1998–2000)
- My So-Called Life
- Omba Mokomba (1997–99)
- Out of the Box (1999–2003)
- Pair of Kings
- Phil of the Future (2004–12)
- Popular
- Power Rangers (2002–09)
- Shake It Up
- The Sinbad Show (2006–07)
- Sing Me a Story with Belle
- Smart Guy (2002–08)
- So Random!
- So Weird (1999–2001)
- Sonny with a Chance
- Speechless
- The Suite Life of Zack & Cody (2006–14)
- The Suite Life on Deck (2008–13)
- Teen Angel (2002–04)
- Teen Win, Lose or Draw (1989–91)
- That's So Raven (2003–10)
- The Torkelsons (1997–98)
- Welcome to Pooh Corner (1988–97)
- Wizards of Waverly Place
- You and Me Kid (1988–92)
- You Wish
- Your Big Break
- Z Games
- Zeke and Luther
- Zorro (1989–98)

===== Animated series =====
- 101 Dalmatians: The Series (2003–04)
- Adventures of the Gummi Bears (1994–2001)
- Aladdin (1997–2001; 2004–05)
- American Dragon: Jake Long
- Bonkers (1993; 1996–99)
- Brandy & Mr. Whiskers
- Buzz Lightyear of Star Command (2001–03)
- The Buzz on Maggie
- Chip 'n Dale: Rescue Rangers (1989; 1993–99; 2003–04)
- Daigunder (2004–05)
- Darkwing Duck (1991; 1995–2001)
- Dave the Barbarian (2004–05)
- Digimon Data Squad
- Donald Duck Presents (1988–93)
- Donald's Quack Attack (1993–99)
- Doug (1999–2001)
- DuckTales (1992–93; 1996–97; 2001–03)
- The Emperor's New School
- Fillmore!
- Fish Hooks
- Gargoyles (1999–2001)
- Good Morning, Mickey! (1988–92)
- Goof Troop (1996–2005)
- Gravity Falls
- Handy Manny
- Hercules (1999–2000; 2004–05)
- Higglytown Heroes
- House of Mouse (2001–05)
- Jake and the Never Land Pirates
- Jason and the Heroes of Mount Olympus (2004–05)
- JoJo's Circus
- Jungle Junction
- Kick Buttowski: Suburban Daredevil
- Kim Possible (2003–09)
- The Legend of Tarzan
- Lilo & Stitch: The Series
- Little Einsteins
- The Little Mermaid (1997–99; 2004–05)
- Lloyd in Space (2005–06)
- Marsupilami (1995–96)
- Mickey Mouse Clubhouse
- Mickey's Mouse Tracks (1996–99)
- Mickey Mouse Works (2000–01)
- Mighty Ducks (2001–02)
- Mon Colle Knights (2003–04)
- The Mouse Factory (1988–90; 1992–95)
- Mouseterpiece Theater (1989–90; 1992–93; 1996–97)
- My Friends Tigger & Pooh
- The New Adventures of Winnie the Pooh (1994–96; 2000–07)
- Nightmare Ned (2001–03)
- Ōban Star-Racers
- PB&J Otter (1998–2003; 2005–06)
- Pepper Ann (2000–03)
- Phineas and Ferb (2008–15)
- The Proud Family (2001–07)
- Pucca
- Raw Toonage (2001–02)
- Recess (1999–2011)
- The Replacements
- The Shnookums and Meat Funny Cartoon Show (2001–02)
- Special Agent Oso
- Spider-Man
- Stanley (2001–07)
- Super Robot Monkey Team Hyperforce Go!
- TaleSpin (1996)
- Teacher's Pet
- Teamo Supremo (2002–04)
- Timon & Pumbaa (1998–2004)
- Wander Over Yonder
- The Weekenders (2002–09)
- W.I.T.C.H.
- The Wuzzles (1993–95, 1998–99)
- Yin Yang Yo!

===== Special programming =====
- Disney Channel Games
- Disney's Friends for Change Games
- Mickey Mouse
- Take Two with Phineas and Ferb

==== Programming from Nickelodeon ====
===== Live-action series =====
- The Adventures of Pete & Pete (2000–02)
- All That (2002–05)
- The Amanda Show (2002–04)
- Clarissa Explains It All (1999–2001)
- Ned's Declassified School Survival Guide (2005–12)
- Zoey 101 (2005–12)

==== Animated series ====
- O'Grady (2006)

==== Programming from DreamWorks Animation ====
===== Animated series =====
- The Adventures of Puss in Boots
- All Hail King Julien
- Dawn of the Croods
- DreamWorksTV
- Home: Adventures with Tip & Oh
- Madagascar: A Little Wild
- The Mr. Peabody & Sherman Show
- Trollhunters: Tales of Arcadia
- Turbo Fast

=== Programming from Awesomeness ===
- Arts Academy
- AwesomenessTV
- Betch
- Cheerleaders
- Cook That
- Food Truck Fanatics
- Guidance
- I Pranked My Parents
- LA Story
- Let's be Honest
- Make Me Over
- Rebecca Black's Life After Friday
- Third Wheel
- What Parents Don't Know

=== Other programming ===
==== Live-action series ====
- ALF (2000–03)
- Amazing Animals (1997–2001)
- Amazing Stories (2002–03)
- Andromeda
- Animals in Action
- Art Attack (1998–2005)
- Chicken Minute (1992–95)
- Crash Zone
- Creeped Out
- Dance Fever
- Darcy's Wild Life
- Deadtime Stories
- The Dick Van Dyke Show (1994–98)
- Dr. Ken
- The Elephant Princess
- Elmo's World (2001–03)
- Eric's World (January 1, 1991 – 1996)
- The Famous Jett Jackson
- Five Mile Creek (1988–92)
- Flash Cats (1996–97)
- Flight 29 Down
- The Fresh Prince of Bel-Air
- The George Burns and Gracie Allen Show
- God Friended Me
- The Good Place
- Gortimer Gibbon's Life on Normal Street
- The Great African Wildlife Rescue
- H_{2}O: Just Add Water
- Hank Zipzer
- Happy Castle
- The Haunting Hour: The Series
- Heirs of the Night
- Huckleberry Finn and His Friends (1990–91)
- Kamen Rider: Dragon Knight
- Kids Incorporated (1988–96)
- The Little Vampire (1988–90)
- Mako Mermaids
- Majority Rules!
- Microsoap
- Mighty Machines (1994–96)
- My Side of the Sky
- The New Adventures of Black Beauty (1991–92)
- New MacDonald's Farm
- Nowhere Boys
- Ocean Girl
- The Ozlets (1995–96)
- Parenthood
- Predators and Prey (1989–91)
- The Return of the Antelope
- Secret Life of Toys (1994–96)
- So Little Time (2005–07)
- Space Cases (1996–2000)
- Spellbinder (1996–98)
- Spellbinder: Land of the Dragon Lord (1998–2000)
- Supergirl
- Wayne Brady's Comedy IQ
- Wildlife International (1991–92)
- The Witches and the Grinnygog (1989–90)
- Woof! (1989–95)
- Yo Gabba Gabba!
- The Zoo

==== Reality series ====
- American Ninja Warrior Junior
- Are You Smarter than a 5th Grader?
- Baketopia
- Bear Grylls Survival School
- Beat the Clock
- Crime Scene Kitchen
- Game of Talents
- Get Out of My Room
- Heads Up!
- Hole in the Wall
- Just Like Mom and Dad
- Top Chef Junior
- Ultimate Tag
- Wipeout
- The X Factor
- The X Factor: Celebrity

==== Animated series ====
- The Adventures of Figaro Pho
- The Adventures of Tintin (1991–95)
- Alvinnn!!! and the Chipmunks
- Babar (1990–2000)
- Billy the Cat (1996–2001)
- Bob the Builder
- Boy Girl Dog Cat Mouse Cheese
- Brown Bag (1991–92)
- Budgie the Little Helicopter (1994–97)
- Bumpety Boo (1990–93)
- Care Bears: Unlock the Magic
- C.L.Y.D.E. (1990–91)
- Curious George
- Daniel Tiger's Neighborhood
- Gadget & the Gadgetinis (2003–04)
- Gadget Boy (1998–2000)
- Grizzy & the Lemmings
- Harry and His Bucket Full of Dinosaurs
- Hey Duggee
- Inspector Gadget
- Janosch's Dream World (1990–93)
- Julius Jr.
- Kate & Mim-Mim
- Kuu Kuu Harajuku
- Lalaloopsy
- Lego Friends
- Lego Jurassic World: Legend of Isla Nublar
- The Little Flying Bears (1990–96)
- Madeline
- Maya the Bee (1990–93)
- Mrs. Pepper Pot (1990–93)
- My Knight and Me
- Nature Cat
- The New Adventures of Figaro Pho
- Norman Picklestripes
- Ovide and the Gang (1988–92)
- Paddington specials (1988–92)
- Rainbow Butterfly Unicorn Kitty (2019–2021)
- Rainbow Ruby
- Sadie Sparks
- Sarah & Duck
- The Save-Ums!
- Sherlock Holmes in the 22nd Century (1999–2001)
- Sonic Boom
- Spongo, Fuzz and Jalapeña
- Spirou (1994–99)
- Storybook Classics (1991–92)
- Strawberry Shortcake's Berry Bitty Adventures
- Supernoobs
- Sunny Bunnies
- Thomas & Friends
- Thunderbirds Are Go
- Tickety Toc
- Twirlywoos
- Wild Grizzly
- The Wind in the Willows (1988–91)
- The Wonderful Wizard of Oz (1988–91)
- The World of David the Gnome (1988–90)
- Wow! Wow! Wubbzy!
- Zak Storm
