= Shadow Projects =

American television production company

- Predecessor: Thunder Pictures
- Founded: 1997; 29 years ago
- Founder: Mitchell Kriegman
- Defunct: 2004; 22 years ago
- Fate: Dormant
- Successor: Big Big Productions
- Headquarters: New York City, United States
- Products: Bear in the Big Blue House; The Book of Pooh
- Number of employees: 18

Shadow Projects was an American television production company best known for making preschool television series with puppetry. Founded by Mitchell Kriegman in 1997, the company created and produced Bear in the Big Blue House, Breakfast with Bear and The Book of Pooh for Playhouse Disney.

== History ==
The company's predecessor was Thunder Pictures, which Kriegman founded in 1990, specifically to produce the Nickelodeon series Clarissa Explains It All. In 1993, Kriegman signed a development deal with Viacom Entertainment Group to develop its properties for television. The company also developed Clarissa Now, intended for CBS in 1995, but never materialized.

Shadow Projects was founded in 1997 by Mitchell Kriegman, creating shows like Bear in the Big Blue House, The Book of Pooh, and Breakfast with Bear. The company's mascot was a barking dog silhouette.

When the company started, the company had a first-look development deal with Jim Henson Productions when the company started after shifting their attention to puppetry through the Shadowmation process.

In 2004, after the company shut down, Kriegman formed its successor, Big BIg Productions (formerly known as Shadowmation Productions) to produce the show, It's a Big Big World, for PBS Kids.

=== TV shows ===
- Bear in the Big Blue House (1997–2006)
- The Book of Pooh (2001–2003)
