= Shadowmation =

Animation process

Shadowmation is a patented animation process (U.S. patent 6,870,574) created by Mitchell Kriegman. It uses realtime virtual sets and bunraku style team puppetry (some puppets are controlled by up to three puppeteers), thus combining live action animatronic characters with computer generated animation in real time, high definition virtual environments powered by video game engines. The resulting effect combines the advantages of animatronics with the expressiveness of live performance and the freedom of computer animation.

== Examples ==
A relatively new technique, Shadowmation has been used in several children's television shows, including Disney's The Book of Pooh, PBS's It's a Big, Big World, and CBC Television and Discovery Kids' Wilbur. The Jim Henson Company's Bear in the Big Blue House utilized this technique for its opening sequence. This technique was also used in The Adventures of Elmo in Grouchland for the song "Take the First Step".
