= List of Bear in the Big Blue House episodes =

Bear in the Big Blue House is a television program for young children produced for the Playhouse Disney channel by Mitchell Kriegman and The Jim Henson Company. It aired from 1997 until 2006 with 117 episodes plus a special made exclusively for home media in 2003.

== Series overview ==
| Season | Episodes | Originally released | |
| Season | Episodes | First released | Last released |
|---|---|---|---|
| Pilot | | Unaired | |
| 1 | 26 | October 20, 1997 | January 5, 1998 |
| 2 | 39 | June 8, 1998 | February 28, 1999 |
| 3 | 26 | July 19, 1999 | December 6, 1999 |
| Surprise Party | | April 1, 2003 | |
| 4 | 26 | September 9, 2002 | April 28, 2006 |

== Episodes ==
=== Pilot (1997) ===
| No. overall | No. in season | Title | Directed by | Written by | Original release date | Prod. code |
|---|---|---|---|---|---|---|
| 0 | 0 | "Water, Water Everywhere" | David Gumpel | Mitchell Kriegman | Unaired | 0 |

=== Season 1 (1997–1998) ===
| No. overall | No. in season | Title | Directed by | Written by | Original release date | Prod. code |
|---|---|---|---|---|---|---|
| 1 | 1 | "Home is Where the Bear Is" | Chuck Vinson | Andy Yerkes | October 20, 1997 | 101 |
| 2 | 2 | "Water, Water Everywhere" | Chuck Vinson | Mitchell Kriegman | October 21, 1997 | 102 |
| 3 | 3 | "Mouse Party" | Hugh Martin | P. Kevin Strader | October 22, 1997 | 103 |
| 4 | 4 | "Shape of a Bear" | Hugh Martin | Jason Root | October 23, 1997 | 104 |
| 5 | 5 | "Picture of Health" | Hugh Martin | P. Kevin Strader | October 24, 1997 | 105 |
| 6 | 6 | "Share, Bear" | Hugh Martin | Andy Yerkes | October 27, 1997 | 106 |
| 7 | 7 | "Why Bears Can't Fly" | Hugh Martin | Andy Yerkes | October 28, 1997 | 107 |
| 8 | 8 | "Falling for Fall" | Hugh Martin | Andy Yerkes | October 29, 1997 | 108 |
| 9 | 9 | "What's in the Mail, Today?" | Hugh Martin | P. Kevin Strader | October 30, 1997 | 109 |
| 10 | 10 | "Dancin' the Day Away" | Mitchell Kriegman | P. Kevin Strader | October 31, 1997 | 110 |
| 11 | 11 | "A Wagon of a Different Color" | Mitchell Kriegman | Ellis Weiner | November 3, 1997 | 111 |
| 12 | 12 | "Dirt, I Love You So!" | Mitchell Kriegman | Andy Yerkes | November 4, 1997 | 112 |
| 13 | 13 | "Music to My Ears" | Hugh Martin | Pippin Parker and P. Kevin Strader | November 5, 1997 | 113 |
| 14 | 14 | "All Connected" | Hugh Martin | Robert Leighton | November 6, 1997 | 114 |
| 15 | 15 | "Summer Cooler" | Hugh Martin | P. Kevin Strader | November 7, 1997 | 115 |
| 16 | 16 | "The Big Little Visitor" | Hugh Martin | Andy Yerkes | December 1, 1997 | 116 |
| 17 | 17 | "A Winter's Nap" | Hugh Martin | Andy Yerkes | December 3, 1997 | 117 |
| 18 | 18 | "Working Like a Bear" | Hugh Martin | P. Kevin Strader | December 9, 1997 | 118 |
| 19 | 19 | "Magic in the Kitchen" | Hugh Martin | Andy Yerkes | December 12, 1997 | 119 |
| 20 | 20 | "Spring Fever" | Hugh Martin | Andy Yerkes | December 15, 1997 | 120 |
| 21 | 21 | "A Plant Grows in Bear's House" | Hugh Martin | Lindsey Aikens | December 17, 1997 | 121 |
| 22 | 22 | "Eat, Drink Juice and Be Merry" | Hugh Martin | P. Kevin Strader | December 22, 1997 | 122 |
| 23 | 23 | "Need a Little Help Today" | Hugh Martin | P. Kevin Strader | December 26, 1997 | 123 |
| 24 | 24 | "Lost Thing" | Mitchell Kriegman | Mitchell Kriegman | December 29, 1997 | 124 |
| 25 | 25 | "Listen Up!" | Mitchell Kriegman | Mitchell Kriegman, P. Kevin Strader and Andy Yerkes | December 30, 1997 | 125 |
| 26 | 26 | "Friends For Life" | Mitchell Kriegman | Mitchell Kriegman | January 5, 1998 | 126 |

=== Season 2 (1998–1999) ===
| No. overall | No. in season | Title | Directed by | Written by | Original release date | Prod. code |
|---|---|---|---|---|---|---|
| 27 | 1 | "Ooh Baby, Baby" | Mitchell Kriegman | Claudia Silver | June 8, 1998 | 201 |
| 28 | 2 | "Raiders of the Lost Cheese" | Mitchell Kriegman | Andy Yerkes | June 1998 | 202 |
| 29 | 3 | "The Big Sleep" | Mitchell Kriegman | Andy Yerkes | June 1998 | 203 |
| 30 | 4 | "Clear as a Bell" | Mitchell Kriegman | P. Kevin Strader | June 1998 | 204 |
| 31 | 5 | "Good Times" | Lisa Simon | Claudia Silver | June 1998 | 205 |
| 32 | 6 | "You Learn Something New Every Day" | Lisa Simon | Noel MacNeal | 1998 | 206 |
| 33 | 7 | "Back To Nature" | Lisa Simon | Claudia Silver | 1998 | 207 |
| 34 | 8 | "The Ojolympics" | Lisa Simon | Chris Moore | 1998 | 208 |
| 35 | 9 | "The Great Pretender" | Lisa Simon | Chris Moore | 1998 | 209 |
| 36 | 10 | "It's All in Your Head" | Lisa Simon | P. Kevin Strader | 1998 | 210 |
| 37 | 11 | "Oops, My Mistake" | Mitchell Kriegman | Chris Moore and Claudia Silver | 1998 | 211 |
| 38 | 12 | "Bear's Birthday Bash" | Mitchell Kriegman | Andy Yerkes | 1998 | 212 |
| 39 | 13 | "Picture This" | Mitchell Kriegman | Lindsey Aikens | 1998 | 213 |
| 40 | 14 | "The Big Blue Housecall" | Mitchell Kriegman | Chris Moore | 1998 | 214 |
| 41 | 15 | "Change is in The Air" | Dean Gordon | P. Kevin Strader | 1998 | 215 |
| 42 | 16 | "Look What I Made" | Dean Gordon | Chris Moore | 1998 | 216 |
| 43 | 17 | "If At First You Don't Succeed..." | Jim Martin | Claudia Silver | 1998 | 217 |
| 44 | 18 | "All Weather Bear" | Dean Gordon | P. Kevin Strader and Andy Yerkes | 1998 | 218 |
| 45 | 19 | "I Built That!" | Jim Martin | Chris Moore | August 8, 1998 | 219 |
| 46 | 20 | "Tutter's Tiny Trip" | Jim Martin | Claudia Silver | 1998 | 220 |
| 47 | 21 | "Dance Fever!" | Mitchell Kriegman | Claudia Silver | 1998 | 221 |
| 48 | 22 | "Afraid Not" | Mitchell Kriegman | Mitchell Kriegman | August 16, 1998 | 222 |
| 49 | 23 | "I Gotta Be Me!" | Mitchell Kriegman | Mitchell Kriegman | August 15, 1998 | 223 |
| 50 | 24 | "Buggin'" | Mitchell Kriegman | P. Kevin Strader | 1998 | 224 |
| 51 | 25 | "Love Is All You Need" | Mitchell Kriegman | Mitchell Kriegman | 1998 | 225 |
| 52 | 26 | "It's A Mystery To Me" | Mitchell Kriegman | P. Kevin Strader | 1998 | 226 |
| 53 | 27 | "As Different as Day and Night" | Dean Gordon | P. Kevin Strader | 1998 | 227 |
| 54 | 28 | "Grandparents Just Want to Have Fun" | Dean Gordon | Lindsey Aikens | 1998 | 228 |
| 55 | 29 | "The Way I Feel Today" | Richard A. Fernandes | Andy Yerkes | 1998 | 229 |
| 56 | 30 | "You Go, Ojo!" | Richard A. Fernandes | Claudia Silver | 1998 | 230 |
| 57 | 31 | "Scientific Bear" | Dean Gordon | Claudia Silver | 1998 | 231 |
| 58 | 32 | "Boys Will Be Boys" | Mitchell Kriegman | P. Kevin Strader | 1998 | 232 |
| 59 | 33 | "I Was Just Thinking" | Mitchell Kriegman | P. Kevin Strader | 1998 | 233 |
| 60 | 34 | "Wish You Were Here" | Mitchell Kriegman | Claudia Silver | 1998 | 234 |
| 61 | 35 | "And To All A Good Night" | Mitchell Kriegman | Noel MacNeal and Mitchell Kriegman | 1998 | 235 |
| 62 | 36 | "Call It A Day" | Mitchell Kriegman | Lindsey Aikens, Mitchell Kriegman, Chris Moore, Claudia Silver, P. Kevin Strader and Andy Yerkes | 1998 | 236 |
| 63 | 37 | "We Did It Our Way" | Richard A. Fernandes | P. Kevin Strader | 1998 | 237 |
| 64 | 38 | "What's The Story?" | Mitchell Kriegman | Mitchell Kriegman and Andy Yerkes | 1998 | 238 |
| 65 | 39 | "When You've Got to Go!" | Mitchell Kriegman | Mitchell Kriegman | February 28, 1999 | 239 |

=== Season 3 (1999) ===
| No. overall | No. in season | Title | Directed by | Written by | Original release date | Prod. code |
|---|---|---|---|---|---|---|
| 66 | 1 | "Friends At Play" | Mitchell Kriegman | Claudia Silver | July 19, 1999 | 301 |
| 67 | 2 | "Nothing to Fear" | Mitchell Kriegman | Claudia Silver | 1999 | 302 |
| 68 | 3 | "Lost And Found" | Mitchell Kriegman | Claudia Silver | 1999 | 303 |
| 69 | 4 | "The Senseless Detectives" | Dean Gordon | Andy Yerkes | 1999 | 304 |
| 70 | 5 | "Halloween Bear" | Mitchell Kriegman | P. Kevin Strader | October 21, 1999 | 305 |
| 71 | 6 | "You Never Know" | Dean Gordon | Lindsey Aikens | 1999 | 306 |
| 72 | 7 | "It's All About You" | Richard A. Fernandes | Andy Yerkes | 1999 | 307 |
| 73 | 8 | "Woodland House Wonderful" | Richard A. Fernandes | P. Kevin Strader | 1999 | 308 |
| 74 | 9 | "I've Got Your Number" | Richard A. Fernandes | P. Kevin Strader | 1999 | 309 |
| 75 | 10 | "What's Mine Is Yours" | Dean Gordon | Claudia Silver | 1999 | 310 |
| 76 | 11 | "Bear's Secret Cave" | Dean Gordon | P. Kevin Strader | 1999 | 311 |
| 77 | 12 | "Smellorama" | Dean Gordon | Claudia Silver | 1999 | 312 |
| 78 | 13 | "I For-Got Rhythm!?" | Mitchell Kriegman | Mitchell Kriegman | August 6, 1999 | 313 |
| 79 | 14 | "Wait For Me" | Mitchell Kriegman | Noel MacNeal | 1999 | 314 |
| 80 | 15 | "Morning Glory" | Mitchell Kriegman | Mitchell Kriegman | August 26, 1999 | 315 |
| 81 | 16 | "That Healing Feeling" | Mitchell Kriegman | P. Kevin Strader | 1999 | 316 |
| 82 | 17 | "The Tutter Family Reunion" | Mitchell Kriegman | P. Kevin Strader | September 15, 1999 | 317 |
| 83 | 18 | "Bats are People Too" | Richard A. Fernandes | Claudia Silver | September 20, 1999 | 318 |
| 84 | 19 | "Words, Words, Words" | Dean Gordon | Claudia Silver | 1999 | 319 |
| 85 | 20 | "Let's Get Interactive" | Richard A. Fernandes | Andy Yerkes | October 12, 1999 | 320 |
| 86 | 21 | "The Yard Sale" | Dean Gordon | Joey Mazzarino | September 29, 1999 | 321 |
| 87 | 22 | "The Best Thanksgiving Ever" | Dean Gordon | P. Kevin Strader | November 10, 1999 | 322 |
| 88 | 23 | "Read My Book" | Richard A. Fernandes | Andy Yerkes | 1999 | 323 |
| 89 | 24 | "Go To Sleep" | Mitchell Kriegman | Mitchell Kriegman and Andy Yerkes | November 19, 1999 | 324 |
| 90–91 | 25–26 | "A Berry Bear Christmas" | Mitchell Kriegman | Mitchell Kriegman | December 6, 1999 | 325-326 |

=== Surprise Party (2003) ===
| No. | Title | Directed by | Written by | Original release date |
|---|---|---|---|---|
| Special | "Bear in the Big Blue House Live! Surprise Party" | Dean Gordon | Mitchell Kriegman | April 1, 2003 (home media) |
A production of the "Bear in the Big Blue House Live! Surprise Party" tour filmed live at the Toronto Centre for the Arts in September 2002, and released exclusively on VHS and DVD by Columbia TriStar Home Entertainment.

=== Season 4 (2002–2006) ===
| No. overall | No. in season | Title | Directed by | Written by | Original release date | Prod. code |
|---|---|---|---|---|---|---|
| 92–93 | 1–2 | "Welcome To Woodland Valley" | Mitchell Kriegman | Mitchell Kriegman | September 9, 2002 | 401-402 |
| 94 | 3 | "Step by Step" | Mitchell Kriegman | Claudia Silver | September 16, 2002 | 403 |
| 95 | 4 | "First Day at Mouse School" | Mitchell Kriegman | Andy Yerkes | September 17, 2002 | 404 |
| 96 | 5 | "Rockin' Rocko" | Dean Gordon | P. Kevin Strader | September 20, 2002 | 405 |
| 97 | 6 | "When Harry Met Hallie" | Tom Guadarrama | Doug Cordell | November 4, 2002 | 406 |
| 98 | 7 | "Show and Tell" | Dean Gordon | Doug Cordell | September 18, 2002 | 407 |
| 99 | 8 | "Tutter Gathers Some Moss" | Dean Gordon | P. Kevin Strader | September 19, 2002 | 408 |
| 100 | 9 | "History, Herstory, Bearstory" | Dean Gordon | Claudia Silver | September 23, 2002 | 409 |
| 101 | 10 | "At the Old Bear Game" | Dean Gordon | Noel MacNeal | September 30, 2002 | 410 |
| 102 | 11 | "The Amazing Skippy" | Dean Gordon | Doug Cordell | October 7, 2002 | 411 |
| 103 | 12 | "Let's Hit The Road" | Tom Guadarrama | Claudia Silver | September 20, 2002 | 412 |
| 104 | 13 | "Appreciation Day" | Dean Gordon | P. Kevin Strader | June 7, 2003 | 413 |
| 105 | 14 | "Show Your Stuff" | Tom Guadarrama | Claudia Silver | October 27, 2003 | 414 |
| 106 | 15 | "The Great Bandini" | Mitchell Kriegman | Claudia Silver | November 3, 2003 | 415 |
| 107 | 16 | "Big Blue Home Of The Brave" | Dean Gordon | P. Kevin Strader | October 28, 2003 | 416 |
| 108 | 17 | "A Trip to the General Store" | Dean Gordon | Claudia Silver | October 20, 2003 | 417 |
| 109 | 18 | "A Strange Bird" | Dean Gordon | Doug Cordell | October 6, 2003 | 418 |
| 110 | 19 | "The View From You" | Tom Guadarrama | Claudia Silver | April 21, 2006 | 419 |
| 111 | 20 | "To Clean or Not to Clean" | Mitchell Kriegman | P. Kevin Strader | April 22, 2006 | 420 |
| 112 | 21 | "Great Ball of Firefighters" | Tom Guadarrama | P. Kevin Strader | April 23, 2006 | 421 |
| 113 | 22 | "Grandma Flutter's 100th Birthday" | Tom Guadarrama | P. Kevin Strader | April 24, 2006 | 422 |
| 114 | 23 | "Tutter's First Big Sleepover Bash" | Mitchell Kriegman | Andy Yerkes | April 25, 2006 | 423 |
| 115 | 24 | "Volunteers of Woodland Valley" | Noel MacNeal | Chris Hoey | April 26, 2006 | 424 |
| 116 | 25 | "Let it Go" | Mitchell Kriegman | Mitchell Kriegman and Claudia Silver | April 27, 2006 | 425 |
| 117 | 26 | "This Is Your Life, Bear" | Mitchell Kriegman | Andy Yerkes | April 28, 2006 | 426 |

== International airings ==
The show was shown throughout the world including in the United Kingdom on five and Playhouse Disney UK, on the Australian Broadcasting Corporation in Australia (April 3, 2000 - April 12, 2010) and on RTÉ Two, The Den and Den Tots in Ireland.
