= DreamWorksTV =

DreamWorksTV may refer to:

- DreamWorksTV (television series), a 2016 Canadian series
- DreamWorksTV (YouTube channel) the former name of Universal Kids (not to be confused with the defunct television channel of the same name), a YouTube channel launched in 2014 by AwesomenessTV

== See also ==
- DreamWorks Television
- DreamWorks Animation Television
