= David Sterry =

David Sterry may refer to:

- David Henry Sterry (born 1957), American author and activist
- David Chaplin Sterry (1832–1904), Australian politician
- David Sterry, Australian musician and lead vocalist of Real Life
