= It's a Big Big World =

American children's puppetry television series

- Title card
- Created by: Mitchell Kriegman
- Starring: Peter Linz; Melissa Creighton; Tyler Bunch; Julie Westwood; James Godwin; Tim Lagasse; Aymee Garcia
- Opening theme: "It's a Big Big World" performed by Peter Linz, Julie Westwood, Tim Lagasse, Aymee Garcia, Tyler Bunch, James Godwin and Melissa Creighton
- Ending theme: "It's a Big Big World" (instrumental)
- Composer: Andrew Kingslow
- Country of origin: United States
- Original language: English
- No. of seasons: 2
- No. of episodes: 47 (93 segments)

Production
- Executive producers: Mitchell Kriegman; Marianne Culbert; Michael Klinghoffer
- Producers: Mary James; Anne Martin Richards
- Production locations: Wainscott Studios, Wainscott, New York
- Running time: 27 minutes
- Production company: Big Big Productions

Original release
- Network: PBS Kids
- Release: January 2, 2006 – January 8, 2010

Related
- Bear in the Big Blue House; The Book of Pooh

It's a Big Big World is an American live-action/animated children's television series created by Mitchell Kriegman, the creator of the Muppet television series Bear in the Big Blue House. It ran on PBS Kids from January 2, 2006, to January 8, 2010. After the series ended, reruns continued until April 30, 2010.

The series was taped at Wainscott Studios (now the LTV (Local TV, Inc.) studios) at the East Hampton Airport industrial complex in Wainscott, New York. Wainscott Studios is the only studio to use Shadowmation, a technique created by Mitchell Kriegman, to bring the puppets to life by combining live-action animatronic characters with computer generated animation in real time, high definition virtual environments powered by video game engines.

== Plot ==
The series revolves around a group of animals living in and around "The World Tree" in the rainforest, along the Amazon River, with the Brazil's highest mountain, Pico da Neblina, in the background. The main character and host of the series is Snook the Sloth. In episodes, the theme song is generally preceded by Snook recapping the previous episode.

The puppets for the characters were created by L'Atelier Des Griffons Inc.

== Characters ==
- Snook (performed by Peter Linz) is a sloth who serves as the main character and host of the show. He lives in the World Tree and loves nothing more than to help his friends learn all about the 'Big Big World' around them. He's extremely slow-moving and often takes naps, but is always up for a scientific investigation. He also enjoys singing and dancing with all of his friends in the World Tree. In addition to interacting with the other characters, Snook regularly breaks the fourth wall, often to explain a certain fact or ask a certain question. Like Big Bird from Sesame Street or Bear from Kriegman's previous show Bear in the Big Blue House, Snook is a full-bodied puppet as well as one of the only two not requiring 3 performers, the other being Madge.
- Burdette (performed by Melissa Creighton) is a crested quetzal who sometimes seems like a controlling older sister, who thinks she knows much more than everyone around her. However, Burdette is very sincere, and while investigating things with her friends in the World Tree, she's sometimes surprised to learn new things about herself too.
- Bob (performed by James Godwin) is a southern tamandua who loves studying the ants that live all around him in the World Tree, and he's always trying new things out to make them like him more. Bob also worries a lot about things that he thinks might happen.
- Smooch (performed by Aymee Garcia) and Winslow (performed by Tyler Bunch) are two playful sibling common marmosets who're always stirring things up. Smooch is always trying to figure out the mysteries of the world around her, and Winslow is the goofy creative thinker. With such different personalities, these two monkeys don't always see eye to eye, but their little disagreements frequently lead to great adventures. The two are similar to Pip and Pop from Bear in the Big Blue House.
- Madge (voiced by Julie Westwood) is an old tortoise. Madge has a map of the world on her shell. She's the oldest and wisest creature in the World Tree and the one everyone comes to when they have a certain problem to solve. Madge traveled all over the world and shares her experiences with everyone. Her library is the place to visit for answers to scientific questions. Like Snook, Madge is a full-bodied character. While the character was dropped after season two, Snook mentions her name in one episode, and she can still be seen in the theme song. Her library also remains in season 2 as well.
- Oko (performed by Peter Linz) is an old brown howler monkey and a trickster who always shows up when least expected. Oko can be a bit grouchy and mischievous, but he also shares mysterious stories and little bits of wisdom with the others. A tai chi master, he carries an old walking stick that he can twirl from his feet to his hands and back again in the blink of an eye. He has a good friend named Tsetse, who sometimes gives good advice. Oko was dropped after season 2.
- Wartz (performed by Tim Lagasse) is a red-eyed tree frog. Wartz has gone through his metamorphosis, growing from a tadpole into a frog in the very first episode. He is best friends with Smooch and Winslow and wants to get along with everyone and will agree with anyone, no matter what they're saying. Wartz was dropped from the show in season 2, but he can still be seen in the theme song. He provides all of the comic relief moments in the series until Riona replaces him for that.
- Ick (performed by Tim Lagasse) is a Fish who lives in the pond under the world tree. He's slightly crabby and mischievous, as shown through his love of playing pranks on whoever he comes across. Although Ick was dropped before season 2, his pond still remains in the theme song and in some Season 2 episodes.
- Riona (performed by Tyler Bunch) is Snook's niece who is a baby sloth that serves as the co-host of season 2 and provides all of the comic relief moments in that season.

== Puppeteers ==
- Peter Linz as Snook, Oko
- Melissa Creighton as Burdette
- Aymee Garcia as Smooch
- Tyler Bunch as Winslow, Riona
- James Godwin as Bob
- Tim Lagasse as Ick, Wartz
- Julie Westwood as Madge (voice)

Additional puppetry was provided by Patrick Holmes, Carol Binion, Frankie Cordero, Eric Engelhardt, Jim Kroupa, Paul McGinnis, John Kennedy, Jodi Eichelberger, Heather Asch, Amanda Maddock, David Jordan, and Lara MacLean.

Many of the puppeteers come from similar shows, primarily Bear in the Big Blue House, Jellybean Jungle, and The Book of Pooh, another show involving Shadowmation, a technique that combines live-action, bunraku-style puppetry, and computer-generated animation.

== Crew ==
- Mitchell Kriegman - Creator, Executive Producer, Songwriter
- Dee Shipley - Voice Director

== Episodes ==
=== Series overview ===
Season	Episodes	Originally released	
Season	Episodes	First released	Last released
1	40	January 2, 2006	April 20, 2007
2	7	October 19, 2009	January 8, 2010

=== Typical episode format ===
Each episode begins with the opening theme song, "It's a Big Big World" that's followed by a short (10-12 minute) story involving some or all of the main characters. In season 1, this first story was followed by another song, called "Curve of the World", sung by all the characters. (In the Miss Lori and Hooper block, this song wasn't shown.) Then comes a second 10-12 minute story, which may be thematically linked to the first story but isn't usually a direct continuation of the plot. In season 2, both stories were followed by Snook singing "Tell Me 'Bout the Best Parts of your Day" to Riona, which led to a discussion about what the characters did and learned that day. At the end of all episodes, Snook sings the closing song, "Try to Touch the Sky", although this is often followed by short segments in which Snook ends an exploring or scientific activity and gives some fun facts about the various species of animals that live in the World Tree.

=== Season 1 (2006–2007) ===
No. in season	Title	Original release date
1	"Not Found Here"	January 2, 2006
2	"Ant Ray Vision; Moving On Up"	January 3, 2006
3	"Balance; Ick Alone"	January 4, 2006
4	"Burdette Queen Ant; One Monkey Too Many"	January 5, 2006
5	"My Friend Will Bee Right Back; Learning to Fly"	January 11, 2006
6	"Spirit; Shell"	January 12, 2006
7	"Out on a Limb; The More Things Change"	January 13, 2006
8	"Dancing; King of the Tree"	January 16, 2006
9	"Burdette Bald Eagle; Hot Ice"	January 31, 2006
10	"Color My World; Smooch's Caterpillar"	February 1, 2006
11	"Mini Monkey; The Five Senses"	February 2, 2006
12	"Wartz's Workout; Hot Enough for You?"	February 20, 2006
13	"Windy Night; So Long Planty"	February 21, 2006
14	"Hold on Rainbow; Where Have All the Berries Gone?"	February 22, 2006
15	"Sappy Monkey; Growing Pains"	April 4, 2006
16	"The Big Sneeze; Go to Sleep Wartz"	April 5, 2006
17	"Down in the Dumps; Who Moved My Sunflower?"	April 6, 2006
18	"The Itch; Everything's Going to Be Just Fine"	April 17, 2006
19	"What a Wonderful Leaf; Roots Rock"	April 18, 2006
20	"Making Tracks; Map It Out"	April 19, 2006
21	"Hide and Seek; Take Care of Yourself"	April 20, 2006
22	"World Tree Day; World Tree Cuisine"	April 21, 2006
23	"The Sloth Must Be Crazy; Smarter Than You Think"	July 10, 2006
24	"Fish Out of Water; Burdette's Nest"	July 11, 2006
25	"Bones; Food and Plenty of It"	July 12, 2006
26	"The Sting; Growing"	July 13, 2006
27	"The Big Race; You Are What You Are"	September 4, 2006
28	"Madge Is Missing; The Anteater Songbook"	September 5, 2006
29	"Get Well Moon; Take Your Time"	September 6, 2006
30	"A Bird Tale; Friendship"	September 7, 2006
31	"Eyes and Noses; Snook's Songbook"	January 15, 2007
32	"The Hatch; Sounds of the Forest"	January 16, 2007
33	"Guardians of the Sappenwood Tree; Over the Hills and Far Away"	January 17, 2007
34	"Oko's Birthday; Spinning a Tale"	January 18, 2007
35	"Echoes; A Good Heartbeat"	January 19, 2007
36	"Big Big Waterhole; Oko's Songbook"	April 16, 2007
37	"Flying Fish; Smooch and Winslow's Songbook"	April 17, 2007
38	"Sloth Lessons; The Avocado Queen"	April 18, 2007
39	"In Good Voice; Wartz's Family Tree"	April 19, 2007
40	"Sleepover; The Disappearing Waterhole"	April 20, 2007

=== Season 2 (2009–2010) ===
No. in season	Title	Original release date
1	"Hanging With a Sleepy Sloth; Enough Is Enough"	October 19, 2009
2	"Winslow Is It; The Fourth R"	November 17, 2009
3	"Making New Friends; Little Things"	November 18, 2009
4	"Things That Go Bump; What's That Smell"	November 19, 2009
5	"Why Can't I Fly; Big Big Dinner Party"	December 28, 2009
6	"Winslow's Gone Bananas; I Love Purple"	January 1, 2010
7	"Big Book of Babies; Club Craze" (series finale)"	January 8, 2010

== Broadcast ==
In the United States, the show aired on PBS Kids from January 2, 2006 to April 30, 2010, and aired as part of the preschool block from September 4, 2006 to August 31, 2007.

In March 2008, British-based Contender Entertainment Group secured worldwide distribution rights outside of the US and Canada to the series. They pre-sold the series internationally to broadcasters such as Nick Jr. in Australia, and Nick Jr 2 in United Kingdom.

== Home media ==
=== DVD ===
Six DVDs were released by Sony Pictures Home Entertainment.

- The Sky Above (January 30, 2007)
- Investigate the World (January 30, 2007)
- Safe and Sound (May 22, 2007)
- The Earth Needs You (May 22, 2007)
- You Can Do It (August 14, 2007)
- The Big Big Sleep (August 14, 2007)

Other DVDs:

- Be Healthy and Happy (March 25, 2008)
- Everyone's Different (March 25, 2008)

=== Streaming ===
Episodes of the show have been available on YouTube since July 27, 2015. The show was added to Amazon Prime Video on August 12, 2022 after PBS Kids acquired the streaming rights on July 27, 2022, officially marking the program's return to PBS Kids in any platform after 12 years. Reruns of the show still currently air only on select PBS stations.
