= The Book of Pooh: Stories from the Heart =

2001 film by Mitchell Kriegman

- DVD cover
- Directed by: Mitchell Kriegman; Dean Gordon; Additional material : Mitchell Kriegman
- Written by: Mitchell Kriegman; Andy Yerkes; Jymn Magon; Claudia Silver; Mark Zaslove; Additional material : Mitchell Kriegman Andy Yerkes
- Based on: The Book of Pooh by A. A. Milne
- Produced by: Robin Seidon
- Starring: Jim Cummings; John Fiedler; Ken Sansom; Peter Cullen; Andre Stojka; Stephanie D'Abruzzo; Jeff Bennett; Paul Tiesler; Vicki Kenderes Eibner
- Narrated by: Roger L. Jackson
- Music by: Julian Harris
- Production company: Shadow Projects
- Distributed by: Buena Vista Home Entertainment (Note: Distributed under the Walt Disney Home Video imprint.)
- Release date: July 17, 2001
- Running time: 76 minutes
- Country: United States
- Language: English

The Book of Pooh: Stories from the Heart is a 2001 American direct-to-video animated comedy compilation film based on the Playhouse Disney television series The Book of Pooh.

It contains 6 episodes, each of which focuses on one character. It is wrapped together by a loose plot in which the characters wait in Christopher Robin's room for his arrival. As is typical with the series, each episode features an original musical number. It is a compilation film composed of footage from the TV series.

This film was produced by Shadow Projects and released on both DVD and VHS on July 17, 2001, by Buena Vista Home Entertainment.

== Plot ==
Pooh, Piglet and Tigger literally pop out of the Book of Pooh into Christopher Robin's room, but can't find Christopher Robin there. Tigger decides to search for Christopher Robin's journal, in hopes of finding out where he's gone, misunderstanding how journals work, but ends up making a real mess. While they're trying to clean up the room, Piglet notices that Christopher Robin had marked some chapters of the Book of Pooh with special bookmarks featuring each of his friends. As the story continues, Kessie, Rabbit and Eeyore each show up too and at one point, they're forced to hide when Christopher Robin's mother comes upstairs after hearing their voices and mistakes them for her son. One by one, the characters ask Mr. Narrator to read the book's stories for them, leading to the following episodes:

1. "Over the Hill" (Pooh's story)
2. "Tigger's Replacement" (Piglet's story)
3. "Kessie Wises Up" (Kessie's story)
4. "Greenhorn with a Green Thumb" (Rabbit's story)
5. "Night of the Waking Tigger" (Tigger's story)
6. "Eeyore's Tailiversary" (Eeyore's story)

At the end, the cast of the first season in The Book of Pooh (except for Owl, who doesn't come out of the book) clean up the mess they've made and go into hiding when Christopher Robin returns with his mother. After she leaves, they come out of hiding and Christopher Robin reveals that he was at soccer practice and had his journal with him all along; furthermore, he only writes in his journal after the events have already happened. He decides to read them the stories he marked, but finds out that they had already read them. Tigger suggests that Christopher Robin should read his journal to them instead, to which he agrees, ending the movie.

== Cast ==
=== Voice cast ===
- Jim Cummings as Winnie the Pooh and Tigger
- Peter Cullen as Eeyore
- Ken Sansom as Rabbit
- John Fiedler as Piglet (speaking voice)
  - Jeff Bennett as Piglet (singing voice)
- Andre Stojka as Owl
- Stephanie D'Abruzzo as Kessie
- Roger L. Jackson as Mr. Narrator

=== Live-action cast ===
- Paul Tiesler as Christopher Robin
- Vicki Kenderes Eibner as Christopher Robin's Mom

== See also ==
- "Winnie the Pooh" (song)
- The Many Adventures of Winnie the Pooh
- The New Adventures of Winnie the Pooh
- The Tigger Movie
