= Paul McGinnis =

American puppeteer (b. 1973)

Paul McGinnis (born 1973) is an American puppeteer for Sesame Street and The Muppets. He has also performed in various non-Muppet television productions such as The Book of Pooh, Julie's Greenroom, The Wiz Live!, Crash & Bernstein, Crank Yankers, Warren the Ape, Greg the Bunny, It's a Big Big World, Between the Lions and Dog with a Blog. McGinnis performed on stage in the 2004–2005 Broadway tour of Little Shop of Horrors, as well as Walking with Dinosaurs − The Arena Spectacular. McGinnis also creates his own works of puppetry on YouTube. In September 2017, McGinnis was an additional Muppet performer on The Muppets Take the Bowl live show at the Hollywood Bowl. In July 2018, he was an additional Muppet performer for The Muppets Take the O2 live show at the O2 Arena.
