= Heather Asch =

American puppeteer

- Born: Heather C. Asch; May 28, 1966 (age 60); Minneapolis, Minnesota, United States
- Occupation: Puppeteer
- Years active: 1991–present
- Website: http://heatherasch.com/

Heather C. Asch (born May 28, 1966) is an American puppeteer.

== Biography ==
Asch, who hails from Minneapolis, graduated from the University of Connecticut's Puppet Arts Program in 1991. Her first puppet project is Bosum Buddies which deals with the topic on breast cancer. Asch also works at Jim Kroupa's puppet workshop called 3/Design which was responsible for creating puppets for The Great Space Coaster and Eureeka's Castle. In addition to her works for The Jim Henson Company and Sesame Workshop, she is also an executive director and producer of No Strings Productions which was established by Kathryn Mullen and Michael K. Frith.

== Filmography ==
=== Television ===
- Allegra's Window - Vi, Aria, Grandma, Jingle
- Bear in the Big Blue House - Various
- Between the Lions - Click the Mouse, Clay the Pigeon, Marmy, Various
- Blue's Room - Grandma Roary
- LazyTown - Trixie (Defeeted, Sports Day & Lazy Scouts Only)
- It's a Big Big World - Additional puppeteer
- Nick Jr. - Pinky, Lefty ("Play Along" segments)
- Oobi - Moppie
- Sesame Street - Hansel (2006), Additional Muppets
- The Wubbulous World of Dr. Seuss - Sneels, Ariana

=== Film ===
- A Muppets Christmas: Letters to Santa - Additional Muppets

== Crew work ==
- The Muppet Christmas Carol - Puppet Builder
- Animal Jam - Puppet Builder, Puppet Wrangler
- Bear in the Big Blue House - Fill-In Puppet Wrangler
- Between the Lions - Puppet Builder, Puppet Wrangler
- CityKids - Puppet Builder
- Jim Henson's Pajanimals - Puppet Builder
- Kermit's Swamp Years - Puppet Builder, Puppet Wrangler
- Muppet Treasure Island - Puppet Builder
- Muppets Tonight - Puppet Builder
- Sesame Street - Photo Stylist, Puppet Builder, Puppet Wrangler
- The Secret Life of Toys - Puppet Builder
- The Wubbulous World of Dr. Seuss - Puppet Builder, Puppet Supervisor
