= Encyclopedia (TV series) =

- Directed by: Joshua White
- Starring: Ethyl Eichelberger; Jim Fyfe; Faith Prince; Carol Schindler; David Sterry
- Country of origin: United States
- Original language: English
- No. of seasons: 1
- No. of episodes: 23

Production
- Producer: Patti Kaplan
- Running time: approx. 30 min
- Production company: Children's Television Workshop

Original release
- Network: HBO
- Release: September 19, 1988 – February 20, 1989

Encyclopedia is a television series created by HBO and the for-profit branch of the Children's Television Workshop (CTW) (now known as Sesame Workshop), Distinguished Productions, Inc. (DPI) (which has since been folded into Sesame Workshop). The series premiered on HBO in 1988.

Each episode covered a letter or series of letters in the alphabet, with short skits of sketch comedy devoted to up to twelve corresponding encyclopedia topics. Several topics were related through song. Three of the six writers of the show had also been writers for NBC's Saturday Night Live: Patricia Marx, Brian McConnachie, and Mitchell Kriegman.

The series featured the band BETTY, who performed both the opening and closing themes as well as individual songs for selected topics.

== Topics ==
The series covered the following topics:

A

- air
- alchemy
- alligator
- ambidexterity
- amoeba
- antler
- ant
- archaeology
- armor
- atom (song)
- Attila the Hun (song)
- avalanche

B

- Bach, Johann Sebastian
- bagpipes
- ballet
- bat
- bee
- Beethoven, Ludwig van
- blood
- bones (song)
- boomerang
- Brahms, Johannes
- brain
- brontosaurus

C

- camel
- carnivore
- caveman (song)
- census
- chain reaction (song)
- chlorophyll
- Cleopatra
- cockroach
- comet

D

- Darwin, Charles
- democracy
- desert
- diet (song)
- dragonfly
- dream
- duck
- dust

E

- earthquake
- echo (song)
- egg
- Einstein, Albert
- emotion
- equator
- Ericson, Leif (song)
- etiquette
- evaporation

F

- feet
- fingerprint
- fire
- firefly
- fish (song)
- food chain
- freezing
- Freud, Sigmund (song)

G

- gene (song)
- geography
- germ
- geyser
- gland
- gladiator
- glass
- glockenspiel

H

- hair
- Hammurabi (song)
- heart
- heat (song)
- hermit
- hiccup
- hieroglyphics
- hummingbird

I

- ichthyology
- identical twins
- income tax
- infinity (song)
- insect
- insomnia
- instinct
- insurance
- intestine
- invertebrate

J

- Jefferson, Thomas
- jellyfish
- jester
- judo
- jugular vein
- July 4th
- jumping beans (song)
- jungle
- Jupiter

K

- kaleidoscope
- kangaroo
- key
- kilt
- knee
- knight
- knot (song)
- knuckles

L

- ladybug (song)
- larynx
- latitude and longitude
- lava
- Leaning Tower of Pisa
- leap year
- leech
- Lincoln, Abraham
- Louis XIV (song)
- lyre

M

- magic
- mammal
- memory
- metrics
- migration
- moon
- mosquito
- moth (song)
- muscle
- mutt

N

- Napoleon Bonaparte
- navigation
- neanderthal
- necktie
- nerve (song)
- Niagara Falls
- nomad
- North Pole and South Pole

O

- ocean
- octave (song)
- octopus
- optical illusion
- optimist
- organ
- ozone
- oyster

P

- paleontology
- parachute
- Pasteur, Louis
- pendulum
- percussion
- phobia (song)
- piranha
- platypus
- pterodactyl
- pyramid

Q

- quarantine
- quark
- quarry
- quartet
- quartz
- quasar (song)
- quicksand
- quilt
- quintuplets
- quorum

R

- radar
- rainbow
- rat
- reflex
- REM
- reptile
- robot
- rocket (song)
- roller skate
- rubber

S

- senses
- skeleton
- skin
- skunk
- snoring
- snow
- Statue of Liberty
- sugar (song)

T

- tears
- teeth
- telephone
- termite
- test pilot
- thumb
- trampoline
- tropical (song)
- turtle
- Tutankhamen

U

- UFO
- ultraviolet rays
- umbrella
- unicycle

V

- valedictorian
- Venus flytrap
- vertigo (song)
- veterinarian
- vocabulary
- vulture

W

- walrus
- wart hog
- Washington, George
- water
- weather
- whale
- whistle (song)
- White House
- windmill
- Wright brothers

X

- X-ray

Y

- yak
- yawn
- yodeling
- yoga
- yo-yo

Z

- Zapata, Emiliano (song)
- ZIP code (song)
- zipper
- zoology

== Awards ==
Daytime Emmy Awards:

- Outstanding Achievement in Costume Design: Calista Hendrickson
- Outstanding Achievement in Makeup: Paul Gebbia

== Merchandising ==
=== Video ===
All episodes were released on VHS in the late 1990s. They are no longer available commercially, but often appear on eBay.
