= Mouseterpiece Theater =

- Written by: Robert Cunniff; Mitchell Kriegman
- Directed by: Mitchell Kriegman
- Presented by: George Plimpton
- Country of origin: United States
- Original language: English
- No. of episodes: 60

Production
- Producers: Robert Cunniff; Mitchell Kriegman
- Production company: Walt Disney Television

Original release
- Network: Disney Channel
- Release: April 18, 1983 – 1990

Mouseterpiece Theater is an American animated television show that ran on the Disney Channel. It premiered on the channel's launch date on April 18, 1983, and continued with reruns into the 1990s.

The show is a parody of the PBS show Masterpiece Theatre, presenting Disney animated shorts instead of showing dramatic works. Like Masterpiece Theatre, it used a section of Jean-Joseph Mouret's Suite of Symphonies for brass, strings and timpani No. 1 as its theme music, but the Disney show used the third movement rather than the first. George Plimpton hosted and gave commentary and background information before and after each cartoon. Each show tended to have a theme; Goofy's emergence as the staid everyman character for example. It usually ran later in the evenings.

== See also ==
- Good Morning, Mickey!, another Disney Channel show featuring Disney shorts
- List of programs broadcast by Disney Channel
- "Monsterpiece Theater," a recurring segment on Sesame Street
