= Joseph Consentino =

- Born: February 6, 1937
- Died: January 19, 2018 (aged 80)
- Education: St. Johns University Columbia School of Journalism

Joseph Consentino (February 6, 1937 - January 19, 2018) was an Italian American director/producer, a father of 2, and a grandfather of 3. He was most famous for the TV Show Big Blue Marble and for co-founding the New England Collegiate Baseball League with former Major League Baseball All-Star George Foster in 1993. The NECBL is a collegiate summer baseball league.

A few months after he was born, in New York City, he was abandoned by his mother and was later found and brought to an orphanage. He lived between the orphanage and homes until being permanently adopted at age 5.

Consentino graduated from St. John's University and the Columbia School of Journalism with degrees in Journalism, and shortly thereafter he worked as a photojournalist for The Saturday Evening Post, Look Magazine and Sports Illustrated.

Consentino had a background in baseball starting in grade school, when he would play with his friends. He didn't stop, he continued through high school and later went onto more. However, his biggest time in the sport was in 1958 at age 21 when he played in the New York to Pennsylvania minor league for the Boston (Corning) Red Socks.

Wanting to tell stories through documentaries along with his wife Sandra Consentino, also a film editor and producer, they created Consentino Films Inc. and Big Bear Films, LLC in Connecticut in December 1987. They won several Emmy Awards, and were nominated for an Academy Award.

Consentino was involved in many television shows throughout his career. In fact, his first time shooting was one of the first episodes of 60 Minutes. From the Big Blue Marble to even a show with Fred Rogers, Joseph couldn't get enough.

Consentino would later travel around the world to shoot movies. From South America to Saudi Arabia he went anywhere he was needed. He would later stay closer to home to make movies, in 1999 directing Family Values: The Mob and the Movies. He is also noted for directing the 2007 documentary Baghdad Diary, along with Mouthpiece: Voice for the Accused and Muhammad Ali: The Whole Story.

On January 19, 2018 he died in the presence of his wife, at the age of 78.
