= Big Blue Marble =

- Genre: Children's television program
- Directed by: Joe Napolitano; Joseph Consentino; Peter Hammer; Cathy Olian
- Theme music composer: Skip Redwine
- Composers: Norman Paris; Paul Baillargeon; Walter Murphy
- Country of origin: United States
- Original language: English

Production
- Executive producer: Henry Fownes
- Producers: Rick Berman; Lynn Rogoff
- Production company: The Blue Marble Company

Original release
- Network: Syndication
- Release: September 21, 1974 – January 1, 1983

Big Blue Marble is a half-hour children's television program that was aired from 1974 to 1983 in syndication including on PBS television stations.

== Overview ==
Distinctive content included stories about children around the world and a pen-pal club that encouraged intercultural communication. The name of the show referred to the appearance of Earth as a giant marble, popularized by The Blue Marble, a famous photograph taken in December 1972 by the crew of Apollo 17.

Each episode featured a segment about the real life of a boy and a girl, one American, the other foreign. The show also had occasional stories about world ecology. In addition there was a weekly segment in which a singing globe "Bluey" invited viewers to write letters to the show, often requests for pen pals. The address to send the letters was in Santa Barbara, California. The character was voiced by executive producer Robert Wiemer.

== Awards ==
- Peabody Award (1975)
- Daytime Emmy Awards (multiple)
