= David Henry Sterry =

American author and comic actor

- Born: David Henry Sterry; June 2, 1957 (age 69); United States
- Occupations: Writer, actor/comic, activist
- Spouse: Arielle Eckstut
- Writing career
- Period: 1983–present
- Notable works: Chicken: Self-Portrait of a Young Man for Rent (2002), Hos, Hookers, Call Girls & Rent Boys (2009), The Essential Guide to Getting Your Book Published, co-authored with his wife, Arielle Eckstut.

David Henry Sterry is an American author, actor/comic, activist and former sex worker.

== Biography ==
=== Early life ===
Sterry's parents were immigrants from Newcastle, England. He grew up in New Jersey; Birmingham, Alabama; Virginia, Minnesota; and Dallas, Texas. He attended boarding school at Darrow School in New Lebanon, NY, went to Immaculate Heart College in Hollywood for one year, where he also was employed as sex worker. This became the subject of his first memoir, Chicken: Self-Portrait of a Young Man for Rent. He then transferred to Reed College, where he studied existentialism and poetry, and graduated in 1978. At 21, was offered a professional soccer contract.

=== Career ===
He started in show business as a stand-up comedian and improviser in the San Francisco during the early 1980s. He also began to act in small productions. In 1984, he moved to New York, where he appeared in commercials for McDonald's, AT&T, and Levi's, eventually becoming the spokesman for Publisher's Clearing House. He also performed in many Off-Off Broadway plays. In 1985 he was hired to be the master of ceremonies at Chippendales. Nick de Noia, the creator of the show, was assassinated while Sterry was working for him. This would become the subject of his second memoir, Master of Ceremonies: A True Story of Love, Murder, Roller Skates & Chippendales. He had a role in the film Memoirs of an Invisible Man. He appeared in a pilot for Eddie Murphy's production company. It starred Margaret Cho, and was not picked up by ABC. This led to a string of guest starring roles in black sitcoms like The Fresh Prince of Bel-Air, Sister Sister and Roc. He became a regular on the HBO/CTW show Encyclopedia, where he played characters ranging from George Washington to Napoleon Bonaparte to Leif Erikson.

He began writing books in 2001, with the publication of Satchel Sez: The World, Wit & Wisdom of Leroy Sawtchel Paige (Random House). His next book, the 2002 memoir, Chicken: Self-Portrait of a Young Man for Rent, details his experiences as a teenage hustler in 1970s Hollywood.

Sterry was invited by the United States Department of Justice, in Washington DC, to attend a "Survivors Conference", where he led a writing workshop with young women who had been exploited in the sex industry.

He performs in a show titled Sex Worker Literati, which consists of people from the sex industry reading and performing original works. Sterry is a regular contributor to the Huffington Post and NPR

With the publication of The Essential Guide to Getting Your Book Published (Workman, 2010), he co-founded the company The Book Doctors, and developed a show called Pitchapalooza, where writers get one minute to pitch their books ideas to a panel of publishing experts.

== Bibliography ==
- Satchel Sez: The Wit, Wisdom & World of Leroy "Satchel" Paige (with Arielle Eckstut)(Crown/Random House, 2001)
- Chicken: Self-Portrait of a Young Man for Rent (ReganBooks/HarperCollins, 2002)
- Zelfportret van een Jongenshoer (De Kern Baarn, 2002)
- Gwen Is So Wet and Honeymoon in Five-Minute Erotica (Running Press, 2003)
- Pollo(Astarte, 2004)
- Callboy (Rowohlt Taschenbuch Verla, 2004)
- Mlado Meso (Celeber, 2005)
- Ubinoyka(Red Fish, 2005)
- Putting Your Passion Into Print: Get Your Book Published Successfully! (with Arielle Eckstut)(Workman Publishing, 2005)
- Confessions of a Sex Maniac in San Francisco Noir (Akashic, 2005)
- Unzipped (Canongate Books Ltd, 2005)
- Travis & Freddy's Adventures in Vegas (written under the name Henry Johnson) (Dutton/Penguin, April, 2006)
- Master of Ceremonies: A True Story of Love, Murder, Roller Skates and Chippendales (Grove Atlantic, 2008)
- Un Pollastro a Hollywood (Adelphi, 2008)
- Hos, Hookers, Call-Girls, and Rent Boys: Prostitutes Writing on Life, Love, Work, Sex, and Money (with RJ Martin Jr.)(Skull Press, 2009)
- The Glorious World Cup: A Fanatic's Guide (PAL, Penguin, 2010)
- The Essential Guide to Getting Your Book Published (with Arielle Eckstut)(Workman, 2010)
- Confessions of a Sex Maniac (Kismet, 2011)
- The Hobbyist (written as King Starr)(Battered Suitcase Press, 2013)
- Mort Morte (Vagabondage Press, 2013)
- What Are They Thinking? (with Arielle Eckstut, Dr. Aaron White, & Dr. Scott Swartzwelder, Norton, 2013)
- Johns, Marks, Tricks & Chickenhawks: Professionals & Their Clients Writing About Each Other (with RJ Martin Jr.)(Soft Skull, 2013)
- Chicken: Self-Portrait of a Young Man for Rent, 10 Year Anniversary Edition (Soft Skull, 2013)
