= Ozzie Alfonso =

Television director

- Born: August 14, 1945; Cuba

Ozzie Alfonso (born August 14, 1945) was the director and one of three Senior Producers of 3-2-1 Contact from season 2 to 8 when the series stopped production. He was also one of the writers for the series from season 3 through 8. Following production of the daily series, Alfonso was the director of all the 3-2-1 Contact Specials, and 3-2-1 Classroom. His work at 3-2-1 Contact garnered two Emmy Awards – for cinematography (contributing cinematographer), and for outstanding directing.

Prior to joining 3-2-1 Contact, Alfonso was a contributing director for Sesame Street where he started in the series second season as post-production supervisor and video editor. He was nominated for a nighttime Emmy for his directing in "Sesame Street in Puerto Rico". He left Sesame Street in 1979 and returned to the Children's Television Workshop (now known as Sesame Workshop) to work in 3-2-1 Contact. After leaving Sesame Workshop, Alfonso freelanced as director and writer of numerous specials for PBS, Nickelodeon, and NBC.

From 1991 until 2008, Alfonso headed his own video production and consulting company, Terra Associates, now "Ozzie Alfonso Media" and from 2005 to 2019 he was an adjunct professor at St. John's University in Queens, New York where he taught courses on media, television production, and writing. He is still an active director/writer working on selected projects.

== Personal life ==
Born in Cuba, he came to the US at age 10 when political turmoil in his homeland forced his parents to leave the country. Ozzie followed a few years later accompanied by his grandmother. He lives in New York with his wife, teacher and children book author, Maura Gouck, and son, David.

== See also ==
- WFUV
- 16th Daytime Emmy Awards
- United States Information Agency
