= The Book of Pooh =

US children's TV series

- Genre: Adventure; Children; Puppetry
- Created by: Mitchell Kriegman
- Based on: Winnie-the-Pooh by A. A. Milne
- Developed by: Mitchell Kriegman
- Directed by: Mitchell Kriegman; Dean Gordon; Jon Ludwig; Bruce Logan; Tom Guaddarrama
- Voices of: Jim Cummings; John Fiedler; Ken Sansom; Peter Cullen; Andre Stojka; Kath Soucie; Nikita Hopkins; Stephanie D'Abruzzo
- Narrated by: Roger L. Jackson
- Opening theme: "Everyone Knows He's Winnie the Pooh", written by Brian Woodbury
- Ending theme: "Goodbye for Now", written by Brian Woodbury and Mitchell Kriegman
- Composers: Brian Woodbury; Julian Harris; Sean Altman
- Country of origin: United States
- Original language: English
- No. of seasons: 2
- No. of episodes: 51

Production
- Executive producer: Mitchell Kriegman
- Running time: 22 minutes
- Production company: Shadow Projects

Original release
- Network: Playhouse Disney (Disney Channel)
- Release: January 22, 2001 – July 8, 2003

Related
- Bear in the Big Blue House

The Book of Pooh is an American preschool educational children's television series that aired on the Playhouse Disney block on the Disney Channel. It is the third television series to feature the characters from the Disney franchise based on A. A. Milne's works; the other two were the live action Welcome to Pooh Corner (to which this series bears some resemblance) and the animated The New Adventures of Winnie the Pooh which ran from 1988 to 1991. It premiered on January 22, 2001 and completed its run on July 8, 2003. The show was produced by Shadow Projects.

== Overview ==
The series departs from many of the established facts of Disney's Winnie the Pooh franchise. For example, Tigger resides in the Hundred Acre Wood from the start, and Kanga and Roo are later introduced as newcomers. Neither Christopher nor his mother speak with an English accent, such is the case in The New Adventures of Winnie the Pooh where Christopher has an American accent. Kessie, the bluebird from The New Adventures of Winnie the Pooh episodes "Find Her, Keep Her" and "A Bird in the Hand", returns as a main character in this series.

Each show begins entering Christopher Robin's bedroom and hearing his mother say "Christopher, time for school." Christopher Robin answers "Okay, mom!", closes his book, grabs his backpack, and leaves. This is where the book with Pooh and his friends in it opens and the theme song begins. The show can be viewed as non-canonical in other ways. For example, Tigger can climb up—but more importantly climb down from trees and Christopher Robin and his mother's faces are never shown. Plus, Rabbit lives in a tree, as opposed to living in a burrow in other adaptations.

== Cast ==
The characters in the show regularly sing and dance in ways that enhance the story being told. Many of the episodes do not have much basis in the original stories by A.A. Milne besides the characters.

The production design of the show was done by Chris Renaud, who would later become the co-director of the 2010 film Despicable Me.

The characters who appear regularly and the actors who voice them are:

- Winnie the Pooh and Tigger: Jim Cummings
- Piglet: John Fiedler (speaking voice)/Jeff Bennett (singing voice)
- Rabbit: Ken Sansom
- Eeyore: Peter Cullen
- Owl: Andre Stojka
- Kessie: Stephanie D'Abruzzo
- Kanga: Kath Soucie
- Roo: Nikita Hopkins
- Christopher Robin: Paul Tiesler
- Christopher Robin's Mother: Vicki Eibner
- Mr. Narrator: Roger L. Jackson

The show's versions of Tigger and Pooh later made an appearance in a music video by the We Are Family Foundation.

== Puppeteers ==
- Heather Asch
- Peter Baird
- Jennifer Barnhart - Kanga
- Carol Binion
- Ron Binion
- Matthew Brooks
- Tyler Bunch - Tigger
- Todd Coyle
- Stephanie D'Abruzzo - Kessie
- Sophie Doyle
- Vicki Kenderes-Eibner
- Jodi Eichelberger
- Eric Engelhardt
- David Matthew Feldman
- Chris Fields
- John C. Fields
- Preston Foreder
- James Godwin
- B.J. Guyer
- Robin Howard
- Eric Jacobson - Piglet
- Liz Joyce
- Jim Kroupa
- Tim Lagasse
- Matthew Lavin
- Peter Linz - Winnie the Pooh
- Jon Ludwig
- Rick Lyon
- Lara MacLean - Roo
- Noel MacNeal - Rabbit
- Amanda Maddock
- David Martin
- Cathy McCullough
- Paul McGinnis - Eeyore
- Anney McKilligan
- John Pavlik
- Barbara Pollitt
- John Tartaglia
- Robin Walsh
- Dan Weissbrodt
- Steve Widerman
- Alice Dinnean-Vernon
- Victor Yerrid - Owl
- Bryant Young

== Episodes ==
=== Series overview ===
Season	Episodes	Originally aired	
Season	Episodes	First aired	Last aired
1	26	January 22, 2001	April 3, 2002
2	25	July 14, 2001	July 8, 2003

=== Season 1 (2001–02) ===
No. overall	No. in season	Title	Directed by	Written by	Original release date	Prod. code
1	1	"Best Wishes, Winnie the Pooh” ”Double Time"	Mitchell Kriegman	Mark Zaslove	January 22, 2001	101
Pooh attempts to grant everyone's wishes as The Great Pooh-Dini. Rabbit thinks he has to do double time after Pooh has X-ed his calendar to the next day. Songs: "Your Best Wishes" by Pooh and Piglet; and "On the Double" by Rabbit.
2	2	"Are You Me?” ”Rabbit's Happy Birthday Party"	Mitchell Kriegman	Mitchell Kriegman	January 23, 2001	102
Pooh receives a note from someone called "Me" and tries to figure out who sent it. Pooh and Piglet prepare for Rabbit's birthday party but get lost on the way to his house and end up in Scary Woods. Songs: "Who Is Me?" by Pooh; and "Think, Think, Think" by Pooh and Piglet.
3	3	"Circumference = Pirates 'Arrre' Squared” ”Pooh's to Do"	Mitchell Kriegman	Jymn Magon Claudia Silver	January 24, 2001	103
Pooh and his friends become pirates and think their stories are no longer interesting with Christopher Robin. Pooh is late for Rabbit's meeting, so Rabbit devises a schedule for him. Songs: "A Pirate Has Got to Have Arrr" by Tigger, Rabbit, Kessie, Pooh, and Piglet; and “A Day in the Life of a Pooh" by Pooh and the cast.
4	4	"Pigletry” ”Dinosnores"	Bruce Logan	Mark Zaslove	January 25, 2001	104
Piglet tries reading a poem he wrote, but his friends keep making changes to it. Owl reads a book about dinosaurs to the gang and they then go to search for a dinosaur, or "dinosnore," as they call it. Songs: "What Piglets Are" by Piglet; and "Dinosnores" (one of a few songs not sung by the cast).
5	5	"My Gloomy Valentine” ”Mr. Narrator"	Mitchell Kriegman	Mitchell Kriegman	January 26, 2001	108
Everyone has a Valentine aside from Eeyore, so Pooh and his friends try to get their gloomy friend a Valentine gift. There's no story today in The Book of Pooh! Mr. Narrator tries making up a story of his own to compromise, but he gets the characters' personalities all mixed up. Songs: "Everyone Wants a Valentine" by the cast [sans Eeyore]; and "That's What We Do" by the cast.
6	6	"Whooo Dunnit” ”Biglet"	Mitchell Kriegman Dean Gordon	Andy Yerkes	January 27, 2001	106
One of Pooh’s honey jars goes missing and mystery-loving Owl decides to take on the case and interrogates everyone. Piglet is sick of being small and wishes to be big. Songs: "We've Got a Mystery on Our Hands" by Owl, Pooh and Piglet; and "If I Could Be Big" by Piglet.
7	7	"I Could Have Laughed All Night” ”X Spots the Mark"	Mitchell Kriegman	Jymn Magon	January 28, 2001	107
When Kessie says she thinks Tigger has a funny laugh, Tigger thinks that Kessie is teasing him so he decides to never laugh again. The gang goes for a treasure hunt for one of Owl's relatives' treasures which is buried in the Hundred Acre Wood. They try to find the X that marks the spot before they can find the treasure. Songs: "Isn't That Funny?" by Pooh, Piglet, Rabbit, Eeyore and Tigger; and "Find the X" by Pooh, Piglet, Tigger and Rabbit.
8	8	"I Came, I Sowed, I Conked It” ”I Get a Cake Out of You"	Dean Gordon	Jymn Magon	January 29, 2001	105
Tigger accidentally messes up the signs in Rabbit's garden when he bounces Piglet and tries to fix them. But then the wrong plants begin growing at the wrong signs. The gang decides to celebrate reaching page 100 of the book by baking a cake. However, nobody listens completely to Owl’s instructions. Songs: "I Watch for Signs" by Rabbit; and "We're Making a Cake" by Pooh, Piglet, Tigger and Rabbit.
9	9	"The Vegetable of Contents” ”A Welcome to Beat the Band With"	Dean Gordon	Jymn Magon	January 30, 2001	109
Rabbit is unable to tend to his garden due to his physical condition, so he calls upon Pooh and Piglet to do the work for him. Rabbit recruits his friends to perform as a band to welcome Kessie back to the Hundred Acre Wood but becomes too obsessed with a “perfect” performance. Songs: "Keep it Simple" By Pooh and Rabbit; and "One Rabbit Band" by Rabbit.
10	10	"Owl's Book” ”Tigger's Autobiography"	Dean Gordon	Jonathan Greenberg Claudia Silver	January 31, 2001	110
Pooh, Piglet, Rabbit and Tigger think they've accidentally taken all the words out of one of Owl's books and decide to rewrite it themselves - with mixed results. Tigger wants to write the story of his life. (This story is also entitled “The Autobiography of Tigger”.) Songs: "The Best Book Ever" by Pooh, Piglet, Tigger and Rabbit; and "The Story of Tigger" by Tigger, Pooh, Piglet and Rabbit.
11	11	"You Can Lead Eeyore to Books” ”The Spice of Life"	Dean Gordon	Jonathan Greenberg	March 12, 2001	111
Everyone's got a book at the library aside from Eeyore, who will help Eeyore pick out a book for him? The bees have gone on vacation, leaving no honey for Pooh. Can his friends find a way to help Pooh eat? Songs: "Have You Got a Book for Me?" by Eeyore, Pooh, Piglet, Tigger and Owl; and "Give it a Try" by Piglet, Rabbit and Tigger.
12	12	"Mr. Narrator” ”Honey Glazed Hamlet"	Mitchell Kriegman	Mitchell Kriegman Mitchell Kriegman and Andy Yerkes	March 19, 2001	112
There's no story today in The Book of Pooh! Mr. Narrator tries making up a story of his own to compromise, but he gets the characters' personalities all mixed up. (This is a repeat of a story shown earlier in the season.) Owl is hit with nostalgia when he rediscovers his old Shakespeare book. Pooh and the gang try to "cure Owl of his nostalgia" and make him happy again. Songs: "That's What We Do" by the cast; and "The Play's the Thing" by the cast.
13	13	"Bee-Friended” ”The Nightmare"	Mitchell Kriegman Dean Gordon	Mitchell Kriegman and Andy Yerkes Jonathan Greenberg	March 26, 2001	113
A bee gets lost, so Pooh and Piglet try to help it find its way back home. Piglet recruits his friends to help him stop having nightmares. Songs: "On Your Way Back Home" by Pooh, Piglet and Bee; and "The Nightmare Wranglers" by Pooh and Tigger.
14	14	"A Win Who Won Situation” ”Best Wishes, Winnie the Pooh"	Mitchell Kriegman	Mark Zaslove	April 2, 2001	114
Tigger and Rabbit compete to see who's faster. Pooh attempts to grant everyone's wishes as The Great Pooh-Dini. (This is a repeat of a story shown earlier in the season.) Songs: "Point of Me/Point of You" by the cast [sans Kessie]; and "Your Best Wishes" by Pooh and Piglet.
15	15	"Biglet” ”Home Very Sweet Home"	Dean Gordon	Andy Yerkes	April 9, 2001	115
Piglet is sick of being small and wishes to be big. (This is a repeat of a story shown earlier in the season.) Pooh's scheme to steal honey results in a hive full of angry bees in his house. Songs: "If I Could Be Big" by Piglet; and "Queen of the Bees" by Pooh, Piglet, Tigger and Rabbit.
16	16	"Don Pooh-Xote” ”Beastly Burden"	Dean Gordon	Jymn Magon	April 16, 2001	116
Pooh and Piglet role play their own spin on the classic tale of Don Quixote and search for the Land "Bee-yond". Eeyore feels like he lacks a purpose, so his friends set out to figure out what Eeyores do best. Songs: "That Sweet Thing You Are Seeking" by Pooh and Piglet; and "Carry On" by Eeyore, Pooh and Piglet.
17	17	"It's a Bird? Yes!” ”A Breezy Little Story"	Jon Ludwig	Mark Zaslove	April 23, 2001	117
Kessie's debut as a superhero proves that heroes don't just fly around looking cool. Piglet and Tigger attempt to construct a kite without the instructions on a breezy day in the woods. Songs: "The Plumed Protector" by Kessie; and "Up, Up and Away".
18	18	"The Small Wonders” ”Are You Me?"	Dean Gordon Mitchell Kriegman	Chris Hoey Mitchell Kriegman	April 30, 2001	118
Kessie and Piglet perform in a talent show. Pooh receives a note from someone called "Me" and tries to figure out who sent it. (This is a repeat of a story shown earlier in the season.) Songs: "The Bluebird Song" by Piglet, Kessie and the cast; and "Who Is Me?" by Pooh.
19	19	"Night of the Brussels Sprout” ”I Could Have Laughed All Night"	Dean Gordon Mitchell Kriegman	Mark Zaslove Jymn Magon	May 7, 2001	119
An unidentified object lands in Rabbit's garden. When Kessie says she thinks Tigger has a funny laugh, Tigger thinks that Kessie is teasing him so he decides to never laugh again. (This is a repeat of a story shown earlier in the season.) Songs: "The Green Thing" by Tigger, Pooh, Piglet, Rabbit and Eeyore; and "Isn't That Funny?" by Pooh, Piglet, Rabbit, Eeyore and Tigger.
20	20	"Kessie Wises Up” ”Eeyore's Tailiversary"	Mitchell Kriegman Dean Gordon	Claudia Silver	May 18, 2001	125
Upset about her limited knowledge, Kessie asks Owl to teach her everything so she will be better able to help her friends when they need it. Rabbit sets the gang in pairs to make a surprise party for Eeyore to commemorate his Tailiversary – the anniversary of the day he got his tail. Songs: "I Want to Know Everything Now" by Kessie and Owl; and "Happy Tailiversary" by the cast [sans Eeyore]. Note: Both stories are featured in the direct-to-video film The Book of Pooh: Stories from the Heart (2001).
21	21	"The Words Are Out” ”Brain Drain"	Dean Gordon	Mark Zaslove	May 21, 2001	121
Piglet wakes up one morning with laryngitis and Pooh believes that his "words are lost" so he promises Piglet he'll find his missing words. Eeyore forgets something he was trying to remember, and Owl comments that he's having a "brain drain." That simple comment puts everyone in fear that they're all suffering from the "brain drain" and are in danger of forgetting everything. Songs: "Where Do Words Go?" and "Show the Sign".
22	22	"Pleas and Thank-You's” ”The Rumor Millstone"	Bruce Logan	Jymn Magon	May 28, 2001	122
Tigger thinks please is a magic word and tries to use its magic to fly like a bird. Can Kessie stop Tigger from trying to fly? Rabbit gets upset with Tigger when his bouncing threatens to mess up his crop of squash, so Rabbit tells a lie that the squash will take away his bounce. Tigger spreads this to the others who misinterpret the story, leading to everyone believing that a monster is in the 100 Acre Wood. Songs: "Thank You, Please" by Owl and Tigger; and "When You're a Monster Too" by Tigger, Pooh, Piglet and Eeyore.
23	23	"Busy as a Spelling Bee” ”Up in the Air Junior Bird Donkey"	Bruce Logan	Mark Zaslove	June 15, 2001	123
When Piglet is unable to spell out words after being stung by a bee, he thinks he has a strange disease from getting stung. Kessie thinks Eeyore looks especially gloomy so she tries to teach him how to fly. Songs: "Under a Spelling Bee's Spell" by Owl, Pooh and Piglet; and "Carried Away with Books" by Owl and the cast [sans Eeyore and Rabbit].
24	24	"Tigger's Replacement” ”Over the Hill"	Dean Gordon Mitchell Kriegman	Jymn Magon Mitchell Kriegman and Andy Yerkes	April 1, 2002	124
Tigger goes on a journey to get in touch with his wild side. Pooh decides to go over the hill in search for adventure. Songs: "Mental Altitude" by Tigger and Piglet; and "Adventure" by Pooh. Note: Both stories are featured in the direct-to-video film The Book of Pooh: Stories from the Heart (2001).
25	25	"Take Me to What River?” ”My Gloomy Valentine"	Dean Gordon Mitchell Kriegman	Chris Hoey Mitchell Kriegman	April 2, 2002	120
Pooh and Piglet decide to name the river in the Hundred Acre Wood. Everyone has a Valentine aside from Eeyore, so Pooh and his friends try to get their gloomy friend a Valentine gift. (This is a repeat of a story shown earlier in the season.) Songs: "What's Your Name, River?" by Pooh and Piglet; and "Everyone Wants a Valentine" by the cast [sans Eeyore].
26	26	"Greenhorn with a Green Thumb” ”Night of the Waking Tigger"	Dean Gordon	Jymn Magon Mark Zaslove	April 3, 2002	126
Tigger learns about gardening from Rabbit. Tigger resolves that he is wasting too much fun time by sleeping through the night, so he tries to stay up constantly. Songs: "Get Growing" by Tigger; and "Tigger's Lullaby" by Pooh, Piglet and Rabbit. Note: Both stories are featured in the direct-to-video film The Book of Pooh: Stories from the Heart (2001).

=== Season 2 (2001–03) ===
No. overall	No. in season	Title	Directed by	Written by	Original release date	Prod. code
27	1	"The Wood Without Pooh" "Friends of a Different Stripe"	Mitchell Kriegman	Claudia Silver	July 14, 2001	201
Pooh is worried about leaving his friends because his special, "good" honey lives far away. When Rabbit's house is flooded by the storm, Tigger invites him to spend the night at his place. Songs: "A Wood Without Pooh" by Piglet, Rabbit and Tigger; and "Impossible to Live With" by Tigger and Rabbit.
28	2	"Mothers of Invention" "Once Upon a Happy Ending"	Mitchell Kriegman	Claudia Silver	July 15, 2001	202
Rabbit babysits Roo for a day, only for Tigger to come along and wake Roo up during nap time. Now they must figure out a way to get bouncy, energetic Roo back to sleep. Mr. Narrator accidentally skips to the end of the story where we find Tigger stuck in a tree. In search for answers, he goes back to the beginning to find Tigger diligently chasing an acorn around the Hundred Acre Wood for Piglet. Songs: "Rhyme-A-By" by Rabbit, Roo and Tigger; and "Friends to the End" by Tigger and Piglet.
29	3	"Piglet's Perfect Party" "A Wood Divided"	Dean Gordon	Doug Cordell	July 16, 2001	203
Piglet is throwing a party, but he wants to make it perfect for his friends. Tigger and Rabbit have a big fight and decide not to talk each other again. Songs: "Perfect Party" by Piglet and Pooh; and "If We Were Talkin" by Tigger, Rabbit and the cast.
30	4	"Day of the Knights" "Come as Eeyore"	Mitchell Kriegman	Pippin Parker	July 23, 2001	204
The story of King Arthur inspires the gang. Eeyore starts to think that he is too boring to show up at Tigger's party. Songs: "Knights of the Roundish Table" by Pooh, Piglet, Tigger and Rabbit; and "You Party Animal, You" by Owl and Eeyore.
31	5	"Bravehat" "Scaredy Cat"	Dean Gordon	Claudia Silver	July 30, 2001	205
Piglet is not sure the hat he found makes him brave. Owl puts Tigger in charge of watching over his house while he's away. When nighttime comes, he, Piglet, and Rabbit hear some strange noises inside of Owl's house. Songs: "Bravehat" by Piglet; and "That's All It Was" by Tigger, Piglet and Rabbit.
32	6	"On a Clear Day You Can Bounce Forever" "The Best Day Ever"	Mitchell Kriegman	Pippin Parker	August 6, 2001	206
When Rabbit tells Tigger he is reading a book about a rabbit who wants to eat carrots forever, Tigger gets the idea that he wants to bounce forever. Pooh and Piglet plan to have the perfect day with all of the activities that they enjoy doing together. However, they face a problem when they realize that things aren't going the way they planned. Songs: "Bouncin'" by Tigger and Rabbit; and "Favorite Day" by Pooh and Piglet.
33	7	"Roo Sticks" "A Hundred Acre Scrapbook"	Dean Gordon	Pippin Parker	August 13, 2001	207
Tigger finds a stick which reminds him of the day that Kanga and Roo first moved in. When Piglet goes on a trip, he tells Pooh to tell him all about what happened while he was gone. But Pooh can't figure out exactly how to do it. Songs: "Someone New to Meet" by Owl, Pooh, Piglet, Tigger and Rabbit; and "Everyday Is a Song" by Kessie and Pooh.
34	8	"Where the Heffalumps Roam" "And a Good Time Was Had By All"	Dean Gordon	Andy Yerkes	August 27, 2001	208
Piglet wonders what Heffalumps look like, so he and Pooh go on a safari to find out for themselves. Owl lends Pooh a watch that needs winding, which causes Pooh to think that time has stopped. Songs: "When I Meet a Heffalump" by Pooh and Piglet; and "Time Stands Still" by Pooh and Piglet.
35	9	"What's News Tigger-Cat?" "Pooh's 24 Hour Bug"	Dean Gordon	Chris Hoey	September 28, 2001	209
Rabbit decides to start a newspaper business after he and Tigger learned about it from Christopher Robin, though Tigger has a hard time trying to come up with a good story. Pooh has come down with a case of the Sneezles, and Tigger, Rabbit, and Piglet have 24 hours to find everything on Owl's list for a cure. Songs: "Who What When Where Why" by Rabbit and Tigger; and "Twenty-Four Hours to Save the Day" by Piglet, Tigger and Rabbit.
36	10	"Blue Ribbon Bunny" "Under the Pig Top"	Dean Gordon	Doug Cordell	November 2, 2001	213
The gang surprises Rabbit with a gardening award and it goes to his head. Piglet writes a story about running away to the circus and Pooh and his friends think he actually wants to do it. Songs: "Gardener of the Year" by Rabbit and the cast [sans Owl and possibly Pooh and Piglet]; and "The Hundred Acre Circus" by the cast [sans Piglet and Owl].
37	11	"The Best Laid Planets (of Tiggers and Roos)" "Happy Harvest Hare"	Dean Gordon	Andy Yerkes	November 23, 2001	211
Kanga reads Roo and Tigger a story about a space adventure. Piglet finds Rabbit dancing after his harvest has finally been completed. Songs: "Into Outer Space" by Tigger and Roo; and "Blissful Bossa Nova" by Rabbit.
38	12	"The Bounce of a Lifetime" "Hare and Share Alike"	Jon Ludwig	Pippin Parker	May 19, 2001	220
Tigger says to everyone that he can leap over the Scary Woods in a single bounce. But is that really possible? Rabbit tries to keep his best harvest ever to himself rather than share it with his friends. Songs: "My Hero" by Roo, Tigger and Kanga; and "If You Don't Have Friends" by Rabbit.
39	13	"The Terrific Talking Tomato" "Kessie Flies for a Spell"	Jon Ludwig	Pippin Parker	April 22, 2003	214
Tigger tricks everyone by making it appear that one of Rabbit's tomatoes can talk. Owl hurts his wing while teaching Kessie some flight tricks. He reminisces about his glory days as an air show star, and Kessie gets inspired to put her own air show to cheer up Owl. Songs: "Talking Tomato" by the cast [sans Kanga and Owl]; and "Flying" by Kessie and Owl.
40	14	"The Book of Boo"	Mitchell Kriegman	Mitchell Kriegman	October 1, 2001	210
On Halloween evening, everyone gathers at Owl's house to listen to the spooky story, "The Goose Who Hated Halloween." Eeyore, however claims to not be scared of much, and doesn't understand the fuss of Halloween. He moves to the Scary Woods after people keep on knocking over his house of sticks. Piglet goes looking for Eeyore but winds up scaring him, and wins the scary costume contest. Everyone now enjoys Halloween in the Hundred Acre Wood, even Eeyore. Songs: "I Wanna Be Scary" by Piglet; "Nuthin' Much Scares Me" by Eeyore; and "The Hundred Acre Halloween" by the cast.
41	15	"Kessie Gets the Message" "Map of the Wood"	Jon Ludwig	Doug Cordell Claudia Silver	October 11, 2002	215
Kessie feels left out of what the gang is doing, so Rabbit tells her she can help deliver messages to the others, but when everyone gives her a lot of messages, she gets tired and has a hard time remembering them. Pooh gets lost and he misses lunch time at Rabbit's house, so his friends help him make a map of the Hundred Acre Wood so he'll never get lost again. Songs: "Ring Your Bell" by Kessie; and "Map of the Wood" by Pooh, Piglet, Tigger and Roo.
42	16	"The Stickiest Glue of All" "A Smackeral in Every Pot"	Dean Gordon	Doug Cordell	May 30, 2003	218
Pooh borrows Piglet’s friendship plate and accidentally breaks it. Thinking the friendship plate represents their own friendship, Pooh believes that their friendship is broken. Tigger hits the campaign trail when the residents of the Hundred Acre Wood get hit by election fever. Songs: "Broken Friendship" by Pooh and Piglet; and "Vote For Me" by Tigger, Piglet and the cast [sans Rabbit].
43	17	"Do the Roo" "Buck-a-Roo"	Mitchell Kriegman	Claudia Silver	May 30, 2003	219
Roo wants to dance for his mother Kanga on her birthday, so he asks his friends for help. Roo is sick in bed, so in order to make him feel better Kanga tells him a story about him as a cowboy. Songs: "Do the Roo" by Roo, Kanga, Pooh, Piglet, Tigger and Rabbit; "The Rabbit Tango"; "The Honey Dance"; "Piglet Ballet"; and "Call Me Buck-A-Roo" by Roo and the cast.
44	18	"Could it Be Magic?" "Diary of a Mad Gardener"	Dean Gordon	Pippin Parker	October 11, 2002	221
Tigger takes up magic, but things start to go wrong when he accidentally makes Piglet disappear. The gang read Rabbit's garden diary and thinks he is criticizing their behavior, so they try to change to make him happy. Songs: "It's Only Magic" by Tigger and Piglet; and "I Never" by Pooh, Piglet, Tigger and Eeyore.
45	19	"I Was the King of the Heffalumps" "Tigger's Club"	Mitchell Kriegman Dean Gordon	Pippin Parker	May 30, 2003	222
Piglet dreams of having the ability to talk to Heffalumps. Tigger starts a fan club for himself and invites everyone to join in. However, that soon evolves into a lot of trouble. Songs: "King of the Heffalumps" by Piglet; and "Pouncing Panther Pledge" by Tigger.
46	20	"Chez Piglet" "Pandora's Suggestion Box"	Dean Gordon	Claudia Silver	May 30, 2003	216
Piglet decides to open his own restaurant. Rabbit has an idea for a suggestion box, but it doesn't work out the way he expected. Songs: "At Chez Piglet" by Rabbit and Piglet; and "A Perfect Forest" by Rabbit.
47	21	"Enter Braying" "Weather or Not"	Dean Gordon	Chris Hoey	May 30, 2003	223
Rabbit stages a play which Eeyore wrote. Rabbit needs rain for his garden, so Pooh, Piglet, and Tigger try to find a way to make it rain. Songs: "That's How You Put on a Show" by Rabbit and the cast; and "Let it Rain" by Pooh, Piglet, Tigger and Roo.
48	22	"The Case of the Disappeared Donkey" "The Littlest Dinosnore"	Tom Guadarrama	Doug Cordell	October 11, 2002	224
Tigger becomes detective "Stripey McSnarl" and investigates Eeyore's mysterious disappearance. Roo is too little to join his friends on an expedition, so Tigger cheers him up with some tall tales about "The Littlest Dinosnore" and the big things he did. Songs: "Stripey McSnarl Always Gets His Man" by Tigger; and "The Littlest Dinosnore" by Tigger and the Male Chorus.
49	23	"Piglet's Inadvertent Adventure" "The Power of the Pencil"	Dean Gordon	Claudia Silver	October 11, 2002	217
Piglet ends up having an adventure, even though he was just going to his mailbox. It's Owl Appreciation Day, and Pooh and his friends have to get ready for it. Songs: "Nothing Ever Happens" by Piglet; and "Power of the Pencil" by Owl and the cast.
50	24	"The Wishing Tree"	Mitchell Kriegman	Mitchell Kriegman	May 30, 2003	212
Roo sets out on a Christmas Eve adventure with Pooh, Piglet and Tigger in search of a tree that grants wishes, while Rabbit follows a magazine's step-by-step instructions for the perfect holiday party. Songs: "The Wishing Tree" by Kanga, reprise by the cast; "At Least There's Still Christmas" by Pooh, Piglet, Tigger and Roo; and "Wish Big" by Pooh, Piglet, Tigger and Roo.
51	25	"The Great Honey Pot" "Paging Piglet"	Mitchell Kriegman	Claudia Silver Doug Cordell	July 8, 2003	225
Pooh goes on a search for a honey pot called "The Great Honey Pot". Pooh and Piglet are flying a kite when Piglet becomes attached to it and blows away. Pooh asks around for help but nobody seems to know where Piglet is, and it isn’t until Mr. Narrator suggests Piglet might be in an entirely different story that the search really picks up. Songs: "Too Much Honey"; and "Lost in a Book" by Mr. Narrator and Pooh.

== Awards and nominations ==
The series received three Emmy Awards nominations, and tied with Sesame Street for Outstanding Directing in a Children's Series at the 29th Daytime Emmy Awards in 2002.

== Film ==
The Book of Pooh: The Stories from the Heart is a direct-to-video animated spin-off based on the television series The Book of Pooh. The film was produced by Shadow Projects, distributed by Buena Vista Television, and released on both VHS and DVD.

It contains six episodes, each of which focuses on one character. It is wrapped together by a loose plot in which the characters wait in Christopher Robin's room for his arrival. As is typical with the series, each episode features an original musical number. It is a compilation film of footage from the TV series.

== Home media and streaming ==
Several VHS Tapes were released in 2001 and 2002:

Fun with Words

- The Words Are Out
- Brain Drain
- I Could Have Laughed All Night
- X Marks the Spot

Fun with Friends

- You Can Lead Eeyore to Books
- The Spice of Life
- Best Wishes, Winnie the Pooh
- Double Time

A Valentine for Eeyore

- My Gloomy Valentine
- Mr. Narrator
- Don Pooh Xote
- Beastly Burden

Fun with Manners

- Pleas and Thank-You's
- The Rumor Millstone
- The Wood Without Pooh
- Friends of a Different Stripe

Fun with Make-Believe

- The Case of the Disappeared Donkey
- The Littlest Dinosnore
- Blue Ribbon Bunny
- Under the Pig Top

The entire show became available to stream on Disney+ on its launch, November 12, 2019.

== See also ==
- Welcome to Pooh Corner
- The New Adventures of Winnie the Pooh
- My Friends Tigger & Pooh
