= Virtual environment =

Networked application enabling interaction with others' work

A virtual environment is a networked application that allows a user to interact with both the computing environment and the work of other users. Email, chat, and web-based document sharing applications are all examples of virtual environments. Simply put, it is a networked common operating space. Once the fidelity of the virtual environment is such that it "creates a psychological state in which the individual perceives himself or herself as existing within the virtual environment" (Blascovich, 2002, p. 129) then the virtual environment (VE) has progressed into the realm of immersive virtual environments (IVEs).
