= Mitchell Kriegman =

American screenwriter

- Born: June 4, 1952 (age 74); Richmond, Virginia, U.S.
- Education: Bennington College
- Occupations: Television writer, director, producer, video artist, author
- Known for: Clarissa Explains It All (1991–1994); Bear in the Big Blue House (1997–2006); The Book of Pooh (2001–2003); It's a Big Big World (2006–2010)

Mitchell Kriegman (born June 4, 1952) is an American television writer, director, producer, video artist, and author.

He is the creator of Clarissa Explains It All (1991) for Nickelodeon, Bear in the Big Blue House (1997) and The Book of Pooh (2001) for Disney Channel and It's a Big Big World (2006) for PBS. Kriegman holds patents for a method of hybrid animation, known as Shadowmation, which combines high-definition virtual-environments with puppets and animatronics, composited and rendered in real time. The production technique was implemented in The Book of Pooh and It's a Big Big World.

Kriegman's first novel was Being Audrey Hepburn (2014). His second novel, Things I Can't Explain (2015), is a reimagining of the titular character of Clarissa Explains It All in her twenties.

== Career and education ==
Kriegman attended Bennington College in Bennington, Vermont, earning a BA in literature in 1974.

He began his career as a writer, video artist and performance artist, under the pseudonym Marshall Klugman. An Evening of Stories and Tricks You Won’t See Anywhere was performed at Dance Theater Workshop in New York City and surrounding venues. His video work of this period included The Marshall Klugman Show (1975), which aired on WNET. As a short story writer, his work has been published in The New Yorker, Between C & D, the National Lampoon, Glamour, George Meyer's Army Man magazine and Harper’s Bazaar.

The Telephone Stories (1979) is Kriegman's series of audio-plays for the telephone, one of the first installations of dial-in art. In addition to being available on a special phone-line, The Telephone Stories toured museums and galleries around the country, including the High Museum and The Boston Institute of Contemporary Art, after premiering at the Whitney Museum, as the department's first audio-only offering. Kriegman wrote and acted in Operation X segments for the PBS Series Alive from Off Center, which have been featured in the Walker Art Center and The Paley Center exhibits. During this period, Kriegman collaborated with Bart Friedman and Nancy Cain of Videofreex on several pieces including "Turkey Dinner" (1982), a precursor to his full length My Neighborhood, funded by the American Film Institute, which aired on WNET/13, and featured a sad sack Kriegman gleefully greeting everyone in his neighborhood, who all ignore him.

Kriegman joined Saturday Night Live in 1980 (season 6) as a performer, writer and filmmaker. During his time there, he made three films:The Dancing Man, Heart to Heart, and Someone is Hiding in My Apartment. He appeared in the sketches "Blame The Kids" and "Virgin Search". He was also a contributor to Michael O'Donoghue's Mr. Mike's Mondo Video (1979), which included the shorts "Cleavage" and "This is a Man in a Dog Suit". A third piece, "The Dancing Belly Button," though not televised, was included in the Anthology Film Archives collection. After leaving Saturday Night Live his work turned markedly toward children's and young adult television programming.

Mouseterpiece Theater (1983), hosted by George Plimpton, was directed by Kriegman and co-written with Robert Cunniff for The Disney Channel; the show was a spoof on Masterpiece Theatre, but instead of presenting serious works in film, Plimpton would introduce Disney cartoons. Further immersion into writing for children's television programming came from HBO's Encyclopedia (1988), and ALF Tales in 1988.

Kriegman produced The Sweet Life (1989), and a sketch-comedy program called Higgins Boys and Gruber (1989) for The Comedy Channel.

Moving to Nickelodeon in 1990, Kriegman became involved in the writing and development of Doug, Rugrats, and The Ren & Stimpy Show, the first three animated series to be created for Nickelodeon as part of their newest programming block, Nicktoons, which all premiered in 1991. Kriegman was nominated for a Primetime Emmy Award for The Ren & Stimpy Show in 1992.The fourth Nicktoon, Rocko's Modern Life, premiered a year later.

Kriegman was the creator and executive producer of Clarissa Explains It All, which starred Melissa Joan Hart. The series ran for five seasons and Kriegman was nominated for a Primetime Emmy Award in 1994 for Outstanding Children's Program. CBS commissioned a pilot for a Clarissa sequel, continuing her story as a young working adult, but the pilot was not picked up.

Mr. Willowby's Christmas Tree (1995), narrated by Kermit the Frog, and Twisted Puppet Theater (1996) had Kriegman writing for puppet characters. Kriegman created the Emmy Award-winning television series Bear in the Big Blue House (1997) and The Book of Pooh (2001), the latter based on the Milne books. Cast with bunraku puppets, both series employed Kriegman's shadowmation technique. Kriegman also wrote for Sesame Street characters in the feature film, The Adventures of Elmo in Grouchland (1999), co-written with Joey Mazzarino.

Kriegman was the creator, executive producer and co-director of It's a Big Big World which aired on PBS Kids from 2006 to 2010.

As of 2015, Kriegman is a novelist, instructor, and guest-lecturer, living in the Southern California area, and an adjunct professor at the University College Dublin. Kriegman has taught webseries development and production and sitcom writing at Stony Brook Southampton, lectures at University of California, Santa Barbara (UCSB). Kriegman's second novel, Things I Can't Explain, based on the central character in Clarissa Explains it All, was published in 2015.

Kriegman, formerly a member of Writers Guild of America, East, left and maintained financial core status.

== Filmography ==
Kriegman’s video-art works are in the Castelli-Sonnebend collection, as well as the Paley Center, Museum of Modern Art (MoMA), The Kitchen Center, and the London Institute of Contemporary Arts among others.

=== Television credits ===
Television credits
Year	Title	Role	Network	Notes
1975	The Marshall Klugman Show	Writer, director, producer, actor	WNET	
1980	Saturday Night Live	Writer, filmmaker, actor	NBC	
1984	Mouseterpiece Theater	Director, writer, producer	The Disney Channel	
1987	Operation X	Writer, actor	PBS	
1988	Encyclopedia	Writer	HBO	
1988	ALF Tales	Writer	NBC	
1989	The Sweet Life	Producer	Comedy Central	
1989	Higgins Boys and Gruber	Writer, producer	Comedy Central	
1991	Doug	Story editor	Nickelodeon	
1991	Rugrats	Story editor	Nickelodeon	
1991	The Ren & Stimpy Show	Story editor	Nickelodeon	
1991-1994	Clarissa Explains It All	Executive producer, creator, story editor	Nickelodeon	
1996	Mr. Willowby's Christmas Tree	Writer (adapted from Robert Barry book)	CBS	
1996	Twisted Puppet Theater	Co-creator, producer	Showtime	
1997	Student Bodies	Executive consultant	YTV, FOX	
1997-2006	Bear in the Big Blue House	Creator, writer, director, producer	Disney Channel	
2001-2004	The Book of Pooh	Creator, director, writer (based on A. A. Milne's book of tales)	Disney Channel	
2005	Life with Derek	Creative consultant	Family Channel	
2006-2010	It's a Big Big World	Creator, writer, producer, co-director	PBS	

=== Feature film credits ===
Feature film credits
Year	Title	Role	Genre	Director
1982	Before the Nickelodeon: The Early Cinema Of Edwin S. Porter	Voice	Documentary - Biography	Charles Musser
1999	The Adventures of Elmo in Grouchland	Story, Screenplay	Children's - Muppets	Gary Halvorson
2001	The Book of Pooh: Stories from the Heart	Writer, co-director	Children's DVD	Dean Gordon; Mitchell Kriegman

== Awards ==
Kriegman has won three Daytime Emmy Awards and has been nominated for two Primetime Emmy Awards, he is the winner of the Directors Guild of America Award (1999), and has been nominated for a Writers Guild of America Award. Bear in the Big Blue House (1997) garnered him two Emmys for Best Direction (in 2000 and 2002), as well as the Directors Guild Award in 1999, and an additional nomination in 2000. His work on The Book of Pooh (2001) was recognized with a Best Direction Emmy in 2002. Other awards include three Parents Choice awards for Clarissa Explains It All (1991), "Clarissa and Peter and the Wolf", and the UNIMA-USA Citation of Excellence for Bear in the Big Blue House, and for The Book of Pooh. It's a Big Big World (2006) received a Webby award, two Emmy Nominations and two Environmental Media Award nominations.

Year	Nominated work	Category	Result	Notes
1992	Rugrats (1991)	Daytime Emmy Awards	Nominated	Outstanding Writing in an Animated Program
1992	The Ren & Stimpy Show	Primetime Emmy Awards	Nominated	Outstanding Animated Program
1993	Doug (1991)	CableACE Award	Nominated	Animated Programming Special or Series
1993	The Ren & Stimpy Show (1991)	CableACE Award	Nominated	Animated Programming Special or Series
1994	Clarissa Explains It All	Primetime Emmy Awards	Nominated	Outstanding Children's Program
1998	Bear in the Big Blue House (1997)	Daytime Emmy Awards	Nominated	Outstanding Pre-School Series
1999	Bear in the Big Blue House (1997)	Directors Guild of America	Won	Outstanding Directorial Achievement in Children's Programs, for "Love is All You Need"
2000	Bear in the Big Blue House (1997)	Daytime Emmy Awards	Won	Outstanding Directing in a Children's Series
2000	Bear in the Big Blue House (1997)	Daytime Emmy Awards	Nominated	Outstanding Pre-School Series
2000	Bear in the Big Blue House (1997)	Directors Guild of America	Nominated	Outstanding Directorial Achievement in Children's Programs, for "A Berry Bear Christmas"
2001	Bear in the Big Blue House (1997)	Writers Guild of America	Nominated	Children's Script, for "A Berry Bear Christmas"
2002	The Book of Pooh (2001)	Daytime Emmy Awards	Won	Outstanding Directing in a Children's Series
2003	Bear in the Big Blue House (1997)	Daytime Emmy Awards	Won	Outstanding Directing in a Children's Series
2003	Bear in the Big Blue House (1997)	Daytime Emmy Awards	Nominated	Outstanding Pre-School Series
2004	Bear in the Big Blue House (1997)	Daytime Emmy Awards	Nominated	Outstanding Pre-School Series
2004	Bear in the Big Blue House (1997)	Daytime Emmy Awards	Nominated	Outstanding Directing in a Children's Series
2005	The Book of Pooh (2001)	Daytime Emmy Awards	Nominated	Outstanding Directing in a Children's Series
2006	It's a Big Big World (2006)	Environmental Media Association Award	Nominated	Children's Live Action Television
2007	It's a Big Big World (2006)	Daytime Emmy Awards	Nominated	Outstanding Directing in a Children's Series
2007	It's a Big Big World (2006)	Daytime Emmy Awards	Nominated	Outstanding Pre-School Series
2007	It's a Big Big World (2006)	Environmental Media Association Award	Nominated	Children's Live Action
Notes: 1. Kriegman was not associated with the Bill Nye the Science Guy program, IMDb misreports a Daytime Emmy Award nomination for the show.; 2. Various sources report that Kriegman has won four Daytime Emmy Awards, this was due to some confusion as to whom was included on the Win for Rugrats in the Outstanding Animated Program (1992) category. Kriegman's work on Rugrats was nominated for, Outstanding Writing in an Animated Program, in the same year.

== Writing ==
Kriegman has contributed works to The New Yorker, the National Lampoon, Glamour magazine, and Harper's Bazaar. At the community level, Kriegman serves as the executive editor for the Montecito Morning Mojo, he has written for the Santa Barbara Independent and the Los Angeles Review of Books (LARB). As a screenwriter, Kriegman has written for Universal, Disney and Columbia Pictures. Kriegman created, produced and wrote teleplays for the television series, Clarissa Explains It All. He wrote the story and co-wrote the screenplay The Adventures of Elmo in Grouchland (1999) with Joey Mazzarino for The Jim Henson Company. Kriegman is a staff writer at the Montecito Journal, and creator of the Montecito Journal Morning Mojo.

- In July 2020, Kriegman donated his archives and working notes to the University of California, Santa Barbara, Performing Arts Collection. Portions of his performance art and video archives will go to the school's Design & Architecture Museum.

=== Books ===
- Being Audrey Hepburn: A Novel (2014) ISBN 978-1250001467 OCLC 890207647

In September 2015, New Form Digital (Brian Grazer - Ron Howard) announced plans to option Kriegman's novel, Being Audrey Hepburn, for screenplay.

- Things I Can’t Explain: A Clarissa Novel (2015) ISBN 978-1250046543 OCLC 962202764

=== Music ===
Kriegman is credited on Peter and the Wolf (1994), a Clarissa narrated version of the Sergei Prokofiev classic, featuring Clarissa & The Straightjackets. His additional songwriting credits are included in the collections: Songs from the Book of Pooh (2002) with Disney, including the closing theme with Brian Woodbury. For the Bear in the Big Blue House series, Kriegman's music credits include: Songs from Jim Henson's Bear in the Big Blue House (2000), More Songs from Bear in the Big Blue House (2002), Bear's Holiday Celebration (2002) and Greatest Hits (2005).

== Innovation ==
Kriegman is credited with the patented design of the hybrid special-effects technique called Shadowmation, that combines live action puppets, animatronics, and computer animation utilizing video game engines and virtual environments. He holds a variety of patents for hybrid animation technologies.
