= Bear in the Big Blue House =

American children's television series

- Genre: Children's television series
- Created by: Mitchell Kriegman
- Starring: Noel MacNeal; Peter Linz; Tyler Bunch; Vicki Eibner
- Voices of: Lynne Thigpen; Geoffrey Holder
- Theme music composer: Bill Obrecht; Peter Lurye
- Opening theme: "Welcome to the Blue House" (1997–1999; replaced by "Christmas Opening Song" in "A Berry Bear Christmas"); "Welcome to Woodland Valley" (2002–2006)
- Ending theme: "Welcome to the Blue House" (Instrumental) (1997–1999; replaced by "Your Grandma and Grandpa" Instrumental in "And to All a Goodnight"); "Welcome to Woodland Valley" (Instrumental) (2002–2006)
- Composers: Underscore: Peter Lurye (Seasons 1–3); Julian Harris; Songs: Mitchell Kriegman; Peter Lurye; Brian Woodbury; Steve Charney; David Yazbek; Julian Harris; Andrew Wyatt
- Country of origin: United States
- Original language: English
- No. of seasons: 4
- No. of episodes: 118 (list of episodes)

Production
- Executive producers: Mitchell Kriegman; Brian Henson (Seasons 1–3); Alex Rockwell (Seasons 2–4)
- Producer: Richard A. Fernandes
- Production locations: Kaufman Astoria Studios (1997–1999); Silver Screen Studios (2002–2006)
- Running time: 25 minutes
- Production companies: Shadow Projects; Jim Henson Television

Original release
- Network: Playhouse Disney
- Release: October 20, 1997 – April 28, 2006

Bear in the Big Blue House is an American children's television series created by Mitchell Kriegman and produced by Shadow Projects in association with Jim Henson Television for Disney Channel's Playhouse Disney preschool television block. The show premiered on October 20, 1997. Its last episode aired on April 28, 2006. Reruns continued afterward through May 6, 2007.

In 2004, the Jim Henson Company sold the rights to the show, including characters, content library and copyrights, to the Walt Disney Company; it is now owned by the Muppets Studio, a subsidiary of Disney that also owns, and is named after, the Muppets characters and copyrights. The show is currently available to stream on Disney+.

== Plot ==
Bear lives in the Big Blue House where he is a caregiver for his friends Ojo, a bear cub, Tutter, a mouse, Treelo, a lemur, otters Pip and Pop, and storyteller Shadow. He and his friends have many adventures together. Those normally include solving problems, sharing, cooperating, and developing social/life skills.

Each episode opens with the welcome song, Bear detecting a scent in the viewers (which he likens to a pleasant smell) and appearance of the characters. Every episode focuses on an individual theme (e.g. sleep, doctors, and Thanksgiving) which folds into a lesson at the end. Songs and jokes accompany the episode. Most episodes feature the character Shadow narrating a segment with shadow puppets. Most of the segments are in song, while some are simply a short story relating to the episode's theme. At the end, Bear sings the goodbye song with Luna, the moon.

== Episodes ==
Season	Episodes	Originally released	
Season	Episodes	First released	Last released
Pilot		Unaired	
1	26	October 20, 1997	January 5, 1998
2	39	June 8, 1998	February 28, 1999
3	26	July 19, 1999	December 6, 1999
Surprise Party		April 1, 2003	
4	26	September 9, 2002	April 28, 2006

== Characters ==
=== Main ===
- Bear (performed by Noel MacNeal) – The protagonist of the series, he is a large anthropomorphic bear who is very kind and lovable. He acts as a big caregiver to Pip, Pop, Ojo, Treelo and Tutter. Bear was designed by Paul Andrejco.
- Ojo (performed by Vicki Eibner) – A curious red bear cub who has a wild imagination and is very good friends with Treelo. She was designed and built by Paul Andrejco.
- Tutter (performed by Peter Linz) – A small light blue mouse who loves eating cheese. He lives in a mousehole in the kitchen of Bear's house. He was designed and built by Paul Andrejco.
- Treelo (performed by Tyler Bunch) – A white, blue, and green lemur who is very playful, loves to dance, always active and very good friends with Ojo. He was designed by Paul Andrejco and built by Kip Rathke.
- Pip and Pop (performed by Peter Linz and Tyler Bunch) – Two purple otter twins who live in the otter pond by the Big Blue House. They were designed by Paul Andrejco.
- Ray the Sun (operated by Peter Linz, voiced by Geoffrey Holder) – A talking Sun who would often rise (or set) at the beginning of some episodes, starting from Season 2. He will also occasionally tell Bear what the weather will be like throughout the day. Sometimes, he also sings the "Good Morning song". He was designed by Paul Andrejco.
- Shadow (performed by Peter Linz, voiced by Tara Mooney) – A shadow girl who is always laughing, telling stories, and sneaking up on Bear.
- Luna the Moon (operated by Peter Linz, voiced by Lynne Thigpen) – A talking Moon. At the end of every episode, Bear walks out onto the balcony and discusses the episode's theme with her. They sing "The Goodbye Song" while playing a montage of the day's events. She was designed by Paul Andrejco and built by Ed Christie. "Luna" means "Moon" in Italian, Spanish, and Latin.

=== Supporting ===
- Grandma Flutter (performed by Alice Dinnean in 1997–1998, Vicki Eibner from 1998–2003) – Tutter's grandmother who has a dance called "The Grandma Mambo". She has a granddaughter named Baby Blotter. She was designed by Paul Andrejco and built by Michael Schupbach and Kip Rathke.
- Cousin Whiner (performed by Victor Yerrid) – One of Tutter's cousins.
- Uncle "Jet Set Tutter" (performed by Tim Lagasse) – Tutter's uncle.
- Doc Hogg (performed by Tyler Bunch) – A pig who is the local doctor. He was designed by Paul Andrejco and built by Eric Englehardt.
- Benny the Bat (performed by James Kroupa) – A fruit bat who lives in the attic of the house.
- Jeremiah Tortoise (performed by James Kroupa) – An elderly tortoise living in Woodland Valley.
- Lois (performed by Vicki Eibner) – A blue-footed booby living in Woodland Valley. She usually mishears things that her friends are saying, which is extremely ironic since her job is telephone operator.
- Annette (performed by Vicki Eibner) – An armadillo who runs the Woodland Valley Cinema and is very shy.
- Henrietta Vanderpreen (performed by Vicki Eibner) – An ostrich who is the editor of Woodland House Wonderful, a magazine of interest to residents of Woodland Valley.
- Skippy - A blind red squirrel living in Woodland Valley who wears sunglasses and uses a cane. He is good friends with Treelo.
- Big Old Bullfrog (performed by Peter Linz) – A bullfrog living in Woodland Valley.
- Jacques the Beaver (performed by Peter Linz) – A French beaver living in Woodland Valley.
- Miss Maxwell (performed by Jennifer Barnhart) – A mouse who is a teacher at the Mouse School.
- Rita Mouse (performed by Anney McKilligan) – A mouse who attends Mouse School with Tutter. She needs some help with painting but is very good at soccer.
- Keisha (performed by Vicki Eibner) – A mouse who attends Mouse School with Tutter.
- Moss (performed by Noel MacNeal) – A mouse who attends Mouse School with Tutter.
- Harry the Duck (performed by Eric Jacobson) – A duck who has been seen several times through the show who addresses bear as "Mister Bear" and quacks repeatedly when he is upset. He was designed by Paul Andrejco.
- Otto and Etta Otter (performed by James Kroupa and Vicki Eibner) – Pip and Pop's grandparents who run the Woodland Valley Library.
- Ursa (operated by Matt Vogel, voiced by Carmen Osbahr) – Bear's old friend from Mexico that appeared twice in "And to All a Good Night" and "You Never Know." She is fluent in both English and Spanish.
- Jack the Dog (performed by Dave Goelz in 1999, Peter Linz in 2002-2006) - A hound dog living in Woodland Valley. He was originally homeless, before having been offered a dog house in Doc Hogg's yard. He is later shown working at the Woodland Valley Fire Department.
- Yukker Tutter (performed by Eric Jacobson) - One of Tutter's relatives. He is distinguishable by the bucket he wears on his head.

Several of these characters appeared in a music video for the We Are Family Foundation. Bear also appeared as a celebrity in the 2002 revival of The Hollywood Squares.

== Cancellation ==
Bear in the Big Blue House was produced from 1997 to 2002. Contrary to a rumor previously reported in numerous media, the show's cancellation was not due to the death of Lynne Thigpen, the voice of Luna, in 2003. According to Noel MacNeal, who performed Bear, Thigpen's death occurred after production had already wrapped.

The final eight episodes of the series aired on Playhouse Disney in April 2006, with the last episode airing on April 28. Reruns of the show ceased altogether in May 2007 (December 2010 in the UK). Thigpen was posthumously nominated for a Daytime Emmy Award for voicing Luna.

== International airings ==
The show was shown throughout the world including in the United Kingdom on Playhouse Disney UK and Channel 5, on the Australian Broadcasting Corporation in Australia, on RTÉ Two in Ireland, on Treehouse TV and TVOKids in Canada, and on Playhouse Disney and TV Globo in Brazil.

== Awards ==
- Daytime Emmy Awards

2000 – Outstanding Sound Mixing – Peter Hefter and John Alberts (won; tied with Bill Nye the Science Guy and Honey, I Shrunk the Kids: The TV Show):2000 – Outstanding Directing in a Children's Series – Mitchell Kriegman, Richard A. Fernandes and Dean Gordon (won)
2003 – Outstanding Directing in a Children's Series – Mitchell Kriegman and Dean Gordon (won)

- Parent's Choice Gold Award Winner – 2000, 2002
- Director's Guild Award – Outstanding Directorial Achievement in Children's Programs - "Episode 225: Love Is All You Need"
