= List of Star vs. the Forces of Evil characters =

The animated series Star vs. the Forces of Evil features a number of characters created by Daron Nefcy. It follows the adventures of Star Butterfly, heir to the royal throne of the dimension of Mewni, who is sent to Earth so she can complete her education and learn to be a worthy princess; and Marco Diaz, a human teenager. As they live their daily lives, go on adventures in other dimensions, and, in the first season, try to prevent the evil Ludo and his minions from stealing Star's magic wand.

== Overview ==
Character	Voiced by	Appearances				
Character	Voiced by	First	Season 1	Season 2	Season 3	Season 4
Main characters
Star Butterfly	Eden Sher	"Star Comes to Earth"	Main	Main	Main	Main
Marco Ubaldo Diaz	Adam McArthur	"Star Comes to Earth"	Main	Main	Main	Main
Supporting characters
Buff Frog Yvgeny Bulgolyubov	Fred Tatasciore	"Star Comes to Earth"	Recurring	Recurring	Recurring	Recurring
Jackie Lynn Thomas	Grey Griffin	"Star Comes to Earth"	Recurring	Recurring	Recurring	Recurring
River Butterfly (né Johanson)	Alan Tudyk (Note: Additionally, Sonny Ashbourne Serkis voices a young River in The Battle for Mewni.)	"Star Comes to Earth"	Recurring	Recurring	Recurring	Recurring
Moon Butterfly Moon the Undaunted	Grey Griffin (Note: Additionally, Katie Driver voices a young Moon in The Battle for Mewni.)	"Star Comes to Earth"	Recurring	Recurring	Main	Main
Glossaryck	Jeffrey Tambor	"Star Comes to Earth"	Recurring	Recurring	Main	Recurring
Glossaryck	Keith David	"Conquer"	Recurring	Recurring	Main	Recurring
Pony Head	Jenny Slate	"Party With a Pony"	Recurring	Recurring	Main	Main
Tom Lucitor	Rider Strong	"Matchmaker"	Guest	Recurring	Main	Main
Eclipsa Butterfly Queen of Darkness	Esmé Bianco	"Crystal Clear"		Appeared	Main	Main
Janna "Banana" Ordonia	Abby Elliott	"Star Comes to Earth"	Guest	Recurring	Guest	Main
Globgor King of Darkness	Jaime Camil	"Conquer"		Pictured	Appeared	Main
Hekapoo "H-Poo"	Zosia Mamet	"Page Turner"		Recurring	Recurring	Recurring
Antagonists
Ludo Avarius	Alan Tudyk	"Star Comes to Earth"	Main	Main	Main	Guest
Toffee of Septarsis	Michael C. Hall	"Fortune Cookies"	Recurring	Recurring	Main	Guest
Meteora Butterfly Miss Heinous	Jessica Walter	"St. Olga's Reform School for Wayward Princesses"	Guest	Recurring	Main	Recurring
Meteora Butterfly Miss Heinous	Bryana Salaz	"Gone Baby Gone"	Guest	Recurring	Main	Recurring
Mina Loveberry	Amy Sedaris	"Starstruck"		Guest	Guest	Main

== Main characters ==
=== Star Butterfly ===
Star Butterfly
- Star vs. the Forces of Evil character
- First appearance: "Star Comes to Earth" (2015)
- Last appearance: "Cleaved" (2019)
- Created by: Daron Nefcy
- Voiced by: Eden Sher

In-universe information
- Species: Mewman/Human
- Gender: Female
- Title: Princess (formerly)

Princess Star Butterfly (Voiced by Eden Sher) is thought to be a magical princess from the dimension of Mewni. On her 14th birthday, she is given the family heirloom - the royal magic wand - but after she causes a big accident, she is sent to the Earth dimension as a foreign exchange student. She then lives with the Diaz family. She enjoys exploring and being away from her parents and their pressure to make her into a perfect princess.

Nefcy had originally designed Star as a fourth-grader obsessed with Sailor Moon and wanting to become a magical girl despite not having any powers. The design was initially just her with heart cheeks, and the devil horns came later. By the time she pitched the idea to Disney, she had made the character older, and an executive suggested she would have actual magical powers, leading to the current foreign exchange student concept. Nefcy says Star is very much like her and that she has a lot of flaws and aspects of being a real girl. Star is Eden Sher's first voice acting role. She describes Star as Disney's first-ever butt-kicking princess and identifies with her a lot: "She's always wrong. She's always messing up. But at the same time, this character has such a good heart. Star is fiercely loyal when it comes to her friends and never backs down from a fight. There's so much going on there. And that's what makes this character so much fun to voice."

Disney sitcom actress Olivia Holt dressed up as Star during the live-action promotions of the series weeks before its Disney XD premiere. Star wears a sea green dress with a pink octopus on the front and magenta and orange striped leggings as well as purple boots with a rhino design. She also has a small yellow Star shaped bag with a face on it and wears a magenta devil horn headband on her head. Star has long blonde hair that goes down to her knees. She has many outfits. For example, in the episode, "Star Comes to Earth", she wears her very beautiful princess dress that originally fits the personality of a girly girl, including a gold tiara on her head, an elegant blue dress with puffy light blue sleeves with dark blue strings around them, a medium blue vest with a darker blue trim and gold buttons, a blue puffy skirt with light blue ornaments and two strings with several hearts, white socks and a pair of very shiny dark blue shoes with light blue puffs on her toes. It was the very first outfit, that Star Butterfly was wearing. Despite its few appearances in the series, her blue puffy princess dress is Princess Star Butterfly's most highly iconic outfit, among her several fans.

=== Marco Diaz ===
Marco Diaz
- Star vs. the Forces of Evil character
- First appearance: "Star Comes to Earth" (2015)
- Last appearance: "Cleaved" (2019)
- Created by: Daron Nefcy
- Voiced by: Adam McArthur

In-universe information
- Full name: Marco Ubaldo Diaz
- Species: Human
- Gender: Male

Marco Ubaldo Diaz^{[GB]} (voiced by Adam McArthur) is Star's best human friend, later becoming her boyfriend. Prior to meeting Star, he was known as a safe kid. He is of mixed Caucasian and Hispanic descent, and typically wears a red hoodie, having said that he owns a dozen of them. He helps Star during their fights against the villains using mostly martial arts moves from training in a karate dojo. He's had a crush on classmate Jackie Lynn Thomas since kindergarten; in "Bon Bon the Birthday Clown", they start dating, but end their relationship later on in "Sophomore Slump".

In "St. Olga's Reform School for Wayward Princesses," he dresses up as a princess in order to retrieve Pony Head, but ends up starting a women's rights movement, of which he is known as Princess Marco Turdina. His success results in him getting regular royalty checks of 650 dollars, the cash being used as a running gag in multiple episodes in Season 2. In "Running with Scissors", Marco psychologically ages 16 years in Hekapoo's time-dilated dimension, wherein two years pass for every minute on Earth. Subsequently, in the season 3 episode "Marco Jr.", it was confirmed that both Marco himself and his friends and family view him as being "26 to 35" years old. As his "Turdina" persona, he has developed a love for makeup.

Nefcy originally conceived of Marco to be a child obsessed with Dragon Ball Z and karate. After Star's character was changed to be a foreign exchange student, she felt Marco's character needed to balance out Star's, so he became more of a straight man yet is still quirky. Some of Marco's character was based on Nefcy's husband (filmmaker Bobby Miller). She likes that McArthur portrays him away from being nerdy or unlikeable and that Marco is smart and thoughtful. McArthur said that he felt really connected to the character, as he has a martial arts background, and when he was younger he had two best friends that were girls.

== Supporting characters ==
=== Moon Butterfly ===
Queen Moon Butterfly (voiced by Grey Griffin (adult) and Katie Driver (young)) was the Queen of Mewni and Star Butterfly's mother. As a teenager, she succeeded to the throne and leadership of the Magic High Commission when Toffee killed her mother (and Star's grandmother), Comet Butterfly, during his attack on Mewni. She made a deal with Eclipsa to learn dark magic, but used it to sever Toffee's finger instead upon realizing that the price of its use was too high. Her experience made her overprotective of Star at times while ruling with a calm, steady, and thoughtful hand. Moon is shown to be a resourceful and capable fighter in her own right, with powerful magical abilities, experienced horsemanship, keen senses and extensive knowledge of the geography and history of Mewni.

After eventually learning that she and Star are of Pie Folk descent and accidentally wounded by Eclipsa when forced to harm Meteora, Moon ends up in the magic dimension and loses her memories. Despite Star's attempt to save her, she retains her amnesia upon being sent back to Mewni by the dimension's guardian, Firstborn. Moon returned to Mewni as Pie Folk, who then exploited her amnesia to bake their pies before Star saves her mother. Moon regained her memories shortly after and ultimately decided to live in the forest, due to her mistrust of Eclipsa, with River and the other Mewmen who had lost their homes under Eclipsa's rule. It is later revealed that Moon ordered Rhombulus to free Globgor and created Mina's army of Solarian warriors to take back the crown. While Mina intends them to exterminate all "monsters", including Eclipsa and her supporters, Moon wishes merely to take the throne and send Eclipsa, Globgor and Meteora into exile. She later regrets it when Mina rebels against her in order to carry out her own plan.

=== River Butterfly ===
King River Johansen-Butterfly (voiced by Alan Tudyk (adult) and Sonny Ashbourne Serkis (young)) was the King of Mewni and Star Butterfly's father. A member of the Johansen family, he married Moon and took her family name. The Johansens are portrayed as rough, Viking-like barbarians fond of the outdoors and fighting who allied with the forces of Mewni in the war against the lizards led by Toffee. River is of a stout, broad physique, sports a full beard, and is fond of wearing no clothes other than a loin cloth made of leaves. He is shown to be physically strong and a relatively bold, inspiring military leader, but was a poor administrator when left in charge of Mewni in Moon's absence. Following Eclipsa's accession to the Mewni throne, River assists his wife in supporting displaced Mewman residendts.

=== Diaz family ===
Rafael and Angie Diaz (voiced by Artt Butler and Nia Vardalos) are Marco and Mariposa's parents. Angie is white, and Rafael is Hispanic. According to the Guide to Mastering Every Dimension, Rafael was born in Jalisco, Mexico. They hosted Star while she was on Earth. Fully aware of Star's magical abilities and other-dimensional origin, they are nonetheless casual about Star and Marco's adventures through time and space, even enthusiastic at the prospect of their son being more adventurous and less of a "safe kid." They are very supportive and nurturing of Marco, with the whole Diaz family sharing enthusiasm for activities such as traveling, hosting foreign students (having hosted a Swedish boy previous to Star), cooking and art. Their casual approach with Marco has led to them somewhat losing touch with their son, unaware of the 16 years he spent in Hekapoo's dimension until Star informs them and deciding to have another child, which they first named Marco Jr., while Marco is living in Mewni. The baby turns out to be a girl named Mariposa, who later gets trapped in the Neverzone dimension with Meteora and grows up to be a teen (voiced by Isabella Gomez).

=== Principal Skeeves ===
Skeeves (voiced by Jeff Bennett) is the principal of Echo Creek Academy. He is very emotional and acts more like an immature student at the school than its principal. He casually mocked Marco as the "safe kid" and unhesitantly accepted Queen and King Butterfly's bribe to let Star attend the school. He was inconsolable after Star destroyed the statue of the school's possum mascot (as was the rest of the school, much to Star's confusion) and is generally shown being concerned with anything but students' education.

=== Ferguson and Alfonso ===
Ferguson O'Durguson^{[GB p. 58]} and Alfonso Dolittle^{[GB p. 58]} (voiced by Nate Torrence and Matt Chapman) are Marco's two friends at Echo Creek. Ferguson has orange hair and enjoys making belly faces. Alfonso has curly hair and wears glasses. They appear mostly in early episodes of season 1, and begin to disappear during season 2 which Star herself mentions in "Collateral Damage" where she declares that she has not seen them all year. They make a brief appearance in season 3 where they have become visibly annoyed at Marco's constant references to his adventures with Star and see him off when he decides to leave for Mewni. In season 4, they reaffirm their friendship with Marco and reveal that they have made new friends with four rather handsome looking teens who have become part of their D&D group.

=== Starfan13 ===
Starfan13 (voiced by Daron Nefcy) is a fangirl with a big obsession over Star Butterfly. She often tries to mimic Star's appearance and interests, like copying her favorite color.

=== Ludo's minions ===
Ludo's minions are monsters that are mostly anthropomorphic mixes of animals and/or human appendages. Some of them are occasionally spotlighted in an episode. They include Beard Deer, Bearicorn, Big Chicken, Boo Fly, Lobster Claws, Man Arm, Spike Balls, and Three-Eyed Potato Baby. They served Ludo in Season One prior to the destruction of his castle in "Storm the Castle". They were replaced with rats in Season 2 and revealed in "Starfari" to have been living in a monster village before later leaving Mewni in a mass monster exodus.

=== Pony Head ===
Pony Head (voiced by Jenny Slate) is a floating talking unicorn head who is Star's best friend from Mewni. She is described as sassy, sarcastic, selfish, and mischievous. She often does not get along with Marco and is sometimes jealous of him when he interacts with Star. Nefcy said that Pony Head originated from an early story of Star where the latter was a fourth-grader and was discouraged during her attempts to recover a stolen bike; an image of Pony Head appeared and told Star not to give up. She is heiress to the Pony Head kingdom and oldest of King Pony Head's 13 daughters. Though often aloof and self-indulgent, she is loyal to Star and willing to help in various causes. In Season 4, she starts a television series called The Pony Head Show.

=== Jackie Lynn Thomas ===
Jackie Lynn Thomas (voiced by Grey Griffin) is a skateboarding classmate who had been Marco's crush since kindergarten. She and Marco started dating in "Bon Bon the Birthday Clown", but ended their relationship in "Sophomore Slump". In "Britta's Tacos", it is revealed that Jackie is bisexual as she is in a relationship with a French girl named Chloé (voiced by Jessica Paré). She is, therefore, the first Disney female character to be in a same-sex relationship, followed by Luz Noceda from The Owl House.

=== Margaret Skullnick ===
Margaret Skullnick (voiced by Dee Dee Rescher) is Star and Marco's homeroom and math teacher at Echo Creek Academy. She is accidentally turned into a green troll by Star in the episode "Match Maker" and retains her form for the remainder of the series.

=== Sensei Brantley ===
Sensei Brantley (voiced by Nick Swardson) at a strip mall karate dojo that Marco attends. In Season 2, it is revealed that Sensei is his actual first name, but in the guidebook he also goes by Brantley.^{[GB]} He learned his karate from instructional videos, and attains his red belt with Marco in "Red Belt".

=== Jeremy Birnbaum ===
Jeremy Birnbaum (voiced by Joshua Rush) is a bratty spoiled kid and Marco's rival whose parents sponsor Sensei's dojo. He is a Tang Soo Do black belt who is willing to cheat using golden brass knuckles to defeat Marco.

=== Oskar Greason ===
Oskar Greason (voiced by Jon Heder) is an Echo Creek student who is Star Butterfly's crush in Season 1. He is usually seen playing on a keytar or in his car where he also resides. Principal Skeeves distrusts him as he has a "record" when Star asked about him. In the episode "Britta's Tacos", he works at the eponymous restaurant.

=== Brittney Wong ===
Brittney Wong (voiced by Minae Noji) is a spoiled rich student and head cheerleader of Chinese descent who would often be annoyed by Star's antics. In the production Tumblr for the French magical girl show LoliRock, the character designer referred to Brittney as an example of the classic trope between characters with contrasting hair colors.

=== Glossaryck ===
Glossaryck (voiced by Jeffrey Tambor for seasons 1–3, Keith David for seasons 3–4) was Star's magic guide, who lived inside the Butterfly family's Book of Spells. While he initially died after Ludo burned the book in "Battle of Mewni", Glossaryck was resurrected in "Rest in Pudding" but appeared to have his intelligence regressed that of a household pet, being only able to say "Globgor!"(the name of Eclipsa Butterfly's husband). In the Season 3 finale, Glossaryck was revealed to have still had his senses and had been trying to tell Star about Globgor throughout the season before taking his leave to join Eclipsa. Glossaryck, along with the Magic High Commission, died when Star destroyed magic, but he seemed to be fine with doing so.

=== Tom Lucitor ===
Thomas Draconius "Tom" Lucitor^{[GB]} (voiced by Rider Strong) is the hot-headed three-eyed demon crown prince of the Underworld, being part Mewman on his father's side. He is introduced in Season 1 as Star's ex-boyfriend, having hired a life coach to help him learn to control his temper, despite his expressing jealously towards Marco and makes attempts to win back Star's love. He eventually ends up befriending Marco in "Frenemies", as both of them enjoy the pop music group, Love Sentence. In Season 3, though he finally moved on, Tom ended up rekindling his relationship with Star while still being friends with Marco. This pervaded even after learning that Marco and Star kissed each other during the events of "Booth Buddies", while helping the latter fend off Meteora in the Season 3 finale. In season 4, Tom and Star begin to emotionally drift apart especially when Star realizes that she does not know what to do with herself. Tom says that he will wait for her, but ultimately chooses to break up with her, especially when he realizes that she is still in love with Marco. By the end, he accepts this and even convinces Marco to pursue a relationship with her.

=== Buff Frog ===
Yvgeny Bulgolyubov (voiced by Fred Tatasciore), who goes by the name Buff Frog, is an anthropomorphic frog who speaks in a Russian accent. He first appeared as Ludo's spy and right hand before he was replaced by Toffee and allied with Star in "Storm the Castle". Buff Frog later settles down in Mewni during Season 2 while starting a family with his children and befriending Star and Marco who help him babysit. He later supports Star and Moon's escapades in "The Battle for Mewni". While Star later named him the Royal Monster Examiner in "Starfari" to help better Mewman and monster relations, Buff Frog decides to lead the monsters in a mass exodus in "Is Another Mystery" to prevent further discrimination against them.

=== Janna ===
Janna Ordonia^{[GB p. 58]} (voiced by Abby Elliott), also known as Janna Banana, is a mysterious Filipino-American student who hangs out with Star and Marco, having a larger role in Season 2. She has black hair and brown eyes and typically wears an olive green shirt and turquoise jacket, yellow skirt, and an olive green beanie hat. She flirts with Marco, breaks into his locker and knows all sorts of his personal information. She enjoys occult stuff such as séances; Star notes that she had once dated a talking skeleton. She frequents Marco's house where she eats their food.^{[GB]} In "Deep Dive" she visits Mewni and it is revealed that she can hypnotize people. She unexpectedly arrives at Mewni in "Out of Business", where she accompanies Star and Marco to Quest Buy's going-out-of-business sale. Since then, she had taken up residence in Mewni. In "Doop-Doop" she, along with Marco, returns to Earth. In "Jannanigans", it is revealed how she arrived at Mewni, it is revealed that while in the basement of Britta's Tacos, she decided to write "Janna was here" on the wall, and accidentally fell into a hole that leads to the Realm of Magic, later managing to end up on Mewni. "In Ready, Aim, Fire", she returns to Mewni along with Star and Marco.

=== Kelly ===
Kelly (voiced by Dana Davis) is a young girl who is recognizable by her large turquoise hair that is able to cover her whole body, but that she can pull back into a large ponytail. She is an old friend of Star and Pony Head's who despite her odd appearance is very down to earth and sincere. She first appears in "Goblin Dogs" where she remained silent until the very the end of the episode when she speaks and reveals that she has a boyfriend named Tad; a small lump of hair who lives on top of her hair. In "Lava Lake Beach", Kelly breaks up with him and becomes depressed. When Marco realizes that he is making himself miserable being around Star, Kelly comforts him and becomes something of an unofficial girlfriend to him. They begin hanging out more often and by "Kelly's World" accept being "break up buddies" and pursue a relationship. This does not last long however, and Marco breaks up with her off-screen in "A Boy and His DC-700XE", which disappoints her. Nevertheless, the two remain friends.

=== Eclipsa Butterfly ===
Queen Eclipsa Butterfly (voiced by Esmé Bianco) is a former queen of Mewni (known during her reign as the "Queen of Darkness") and was assumed to be an ancestor of Star and Moon Butterfly before their true lineage was revealed. Three centuries before the events of the series, Eclipsa was imprisoned in crystal for the use of "dark magic" and eloping with Globgor, a monster; while her child, Meteora, was replaced with a Pie Folk girl named Festivia, who is the true ancestor of Star's bloodline.

When the kingdom was attacked by Toffee, Moon made a deal with Eclipsa to learn a forbidden spell capable of killing him in exchange for her freedom. Though Moon used the spell to sever Toffee's finger instead, the lizard's apparent death in "The Battle for Mewni" frees Eclipsa. Upon discovery of her escape, Eclipsa is placed under house arrest rather than recrystallization on Star's behest to hold a fair trial. When the trial occurs in "Butterfly Trap", Eclipsa helped Star and Moon in forcing the Magic High Commission to admit their actions against her. Later, despite Eclipsa's attempts to reach her long-lost daughter in "Tough Love", unintentionally causing Moon to go missing and losing Star's trust, she ultimately uses her magic to turn Meteora back into a baby in "Conquer", with Star restoring her status as the Queen of Mewni. During Season 4, setting her palace in the restored Monster Temple, Eclipsa made several attempts to free Globgor from his crystal prison while also trying to win the respect of the Mewmen. On her coronation day, she was accused of freeing Globgor. Later she is finally reunited with him and crowned queen with the approval of the kingdom. In "Pizza Party", she was betrayed by Moon, who demands her surrender of both the wand and kingdom. At the end of the series, she helps Star to destroy all magic and is finally able to live a happy life with her husband and child.

=== Globgor ===
Globgor (voiced by Jaime Camil), is Eclipsa's monster husband and the father of Meteora, who was crystallized around the same time as Eclipsa. Throughout Season 3, Glossaryck constantly mentioned his name, trying to warn everyone before coming to the point after Meteora was turned into a baby and Eclipsa reunited with his crystallized body at the Monster Temple. In Season 4, Eclipsa makes various attempts to free Globgor, even going as far to steal Rhombulus' body. It was later revealed that his army ravaged the Spiderbite Kingdom Village and ate Eclipsa's ex-husband, King Shastacan Spiderbite. On Eclipsa's coronation, Rhombulus freed him and he runs away to protect his family. He is later brought back by Star to show that he is not evil and is reunited with his family and accepted by the kingdom.

=== Avarius family ===
Lord Brudo Avarius (voiced by John DiMaggio) and Lady Avarius (voiced by Tress MacNeille) are Ludo's parents and the former inhabitants of Castle Avarius. Though it is stated they have dozens of offspring, the only child, other than Ludo, seen in the series is Ludo's younger brother, Dennis (voiced by Atticus Shaffer). They lived in Castle Avarius until Ludo occupied it with his minions while they were on vacation, afterward relegated to a run down house in the Forest of Certain Death. They are a very dysfunctional family, with Ludo recounting several incidents of emotional abuse and Brudo expressing no regret for "being hard" on Ludo as a child, calling him a "runt." Brudo is gruff, lazy, rude and dismissive of Lady Avarius' attempts at some semblance of noble dignity in their exile. Lady Avarius is frenetic, with rapid shifts in mood and attention, but is equally angry at Ludo. She notably has a black eye swollen shut when she first appears in the show, though no explanation is given. Dennis, contrary to his parents, shows warmth and concern for others, especially Ludo. He assisted Queen Moon in finding Ludo after confiding in her about his brother's slipping sanity. All members of the Avarius family are humanoid with avian features, round heads and beaks. They are very tall, except for Ludo. Dennis is capable of flying and even carried Queen Moon to and from Ludo's hideout. Ludo has no contact with his family but does expresses fondness when Dennis is specifically mentioned. The trauma from Ludo's childhood comes out when he fashions dolls in the likeness of his parents. After imagining them saying loving, supportive things for a while, the caricatures revert to memory and he compulsively puppets the abusive, denigrating personalities his parents actually have.

== Antagonists ==
=== Ludo ===
Ludo Avarius (voiced by Alan Tudyk) is a major avarian from Mewni with a round head and a beak and wears a cap made out of the upper part of a creature's skull. Due to his terrible childhood and need to prove his worth, later kicking his entire family out of their home Castle Avarius, Ludo sought out Star's wand so he can use its powers to take over the universe. He commanded an army of monsters. As most of his minions are incompetent, he ends up hiring Toffee, but later betrayed when Toffee took over his operations and kicks him out of Castle Avarius. At the end of Season 1, the castle is destroyed and an upset Ludo is thrown into the void.

In Season 2, after a while of soul searching in the wilderness, he acquires a new wand made from Toffee's severed arm gripping on the corrupted fragment of Star's original wand. His new minions in Season 2 are primarily a giant spider and a giant bald eagle, as well as a group of rats and monsters. He uses the wand with some moderate success on levitating, but is eventually possessed by Toffee and used to take over Mewni during the events of "Battle of Mewni". Toffee later abandons his unsuspecting host once he created his restored body. After playing a role in Toffee's demise, Ludo convinces Star to send him back into a void for more soul-searching. In "Ludo, Where Art Thou?" he is found by Dennis and Spider, having made a house of trash in the void. By end of the episode, Dennis learns to stand up to his parents and Ludo decides to remain in the void, stating that he still has a lot of issues to work out.

In the Season 4 episode "Princess Quasar Caterpillar and the Magic Bell", after to falling back to his old ways, which he curses himself for, Dennis shows up and reveals he bought the deed to Castle Avarius and hired all of Ludo's old minions to rebuild it. But when Ludo's minions thinks he's going to steal the wand from Eclipsa, the reminders of his past cause him to maniacally scheme to steal it, with Dennis catching him in the act. Ludo angrily admits he hates the castle and just wants to move on from the past. When the landowner Dennis bought the deed from had conned him out of the castle, making Dennis feeling foolish for being so trusting, Ludo embraces his former villainous ways and tortures the landowner for the deed back and hires some of their siblings as construction worker, leading the brothers to being ready for a new life.

=== Toffee ===
Toffee (voiced by Michael C. Hall) was a Septarian, a race of humanoid lizards with regenerative abilities that make them essentially immortal, who had been an enemy to Star's family. Nefcy said that she and her staff "wanted Star to fight against somebody who is a greater evil", as Ludo was "super fun" but "not a scary villain".

Years prior to meeting Ludo, Toffee led a Septarian army against Mewni before a confrontation with a teenage Moon Butterfly, whose mother he and his army murdered when she was attempting to sign a peace treaty, forced his army to fall back after using a dark spell designed to kill immortals that permanently severs his finger. After Star goes to Earth, Toffee convinces Ludo into hiring him as an efficiency expert in "Fortune Cookies". Toffee eventually uses his charisma to win over Ludo's minions into kicking Ludo out and serving him instead in "Storm the Castle", later capturing Marco and forcing Star to destroy her wand. Although Toffee is consumed in the following explosion, his skeletal arm remained, with a grip on the missing half of Star's wand fragment. In the Season 2 episode "Ludo in the Wild", his arm and wand fragment were found by Ludo, who uses it as a makeshift wand. However, Toffee slowly manipulated Ludo and eventually possessed him. He later took over Mewni in the TV movie "The Battle for Mewni", where he forced Moon to return his severed finger to him, completely restoring his body in the process. Toffee ended up being gravely wounded by Star before being apparently killed by Ludo, who knocked a pillar onto him.

=== Meteora Butterfly / Miss Heinous ===
Meteora Butterfly (voiced by Jessica Walter, Bryana Salaz and Tress MacNeille as a teen, Tress MacNeille as a kid, and Kari Wahlgren as a baby) is the Mewman-Monster hybrid daughter of Eclipsa and Globgor, and the true heir to the Mewni throne, having been replaced with a peasant girl named Festivia. Raised by robot headmistress Olga as Miss Heinous, Meteora forgets her identity while eventually taking over as the headmistress of St. Olga's Reform School for Wayward Princesses, with the support of her robot assistant Gemini (voiced by Bennett) and the Septarian bounty hunter Rasticore Chaosus Disastervaine (voiced by Chris Tergliafera). She was eventually forced out of St Olga's when deposed by Star and Marco, bearing a grudge on them. Later, Meteora accidentally stumbled upon her childhood home during the events of "Monster Bash" and regained her memories as a result. Meteora later forces her way back into St. Olga's in the events of "Skooled!", ripping Pony Head's horn off after learning the full truth of her heritage with aspirations of claiming her birthright as ruler of Mewni. Gradually transforming into a giant soul-sucking monster, Meteora is ultimately reverted into a baby by Eclipsa in the Season 3 finale. In Season 4, she and Marco's baby sister, Mariposa, would later be trapped in the Neverzone dimension and grow up to be teens.

=== Mina Loveberry ===
Mina Loveberry (voiced by Amy Sedaris) is a Mewman warrior first introduced in the episode "Starstruck". Revealed in the final season to originally be a peasant whom Queen Solaria (Voiced by Gemma Whelan) transformed into a magic-resistant super-soldier during her reign, Mina is a renowned protector of Mewni with an insane obsession of her vow to Solaria to exterminate every monster. Star initially aspired to be a warrior like Mina until she attempted to conquer Earth out of disgust over America's democracy. She tried to kill Miss Heinous when she learned of her true heritage in the episode "Monster Bash", and later lost to her in "Divide" while she was growing in power. Mina would later make assassination attempts on Eclipsa to reinstate Moon, who secretly employed her services, before allying herself with the Magic High Commission to dethrone Eclipsa and having her crow Sebastian assemble a suit of armor she later uses. Mina eventually betrays Moon once realizing she intends to allow Eclipsa and her family to leave in peace, resolving to exterminate them and all monster sympathizers. Mina follows Star to the Realm of Magic to stop her from destroying magic, only to be attacked by the dark unicorn. Mina survives the destruction of magic and is offered help by Moon which she rejected, she became powerless yet still adamant of her idea to commit mass genocide on the monsters of Mewni while running off into the woods.

=== Magic High Commission ===
A group of powerful magical beings who acted as guardians of magic in the universe and act in what they consider to be in Mewni's best interests, the council members being created by Glossaryck to present the benefits of magic, time, space, and dimensional exploration to the universe. The commission's membership also included Glossaryck and Moon at the start of the series. In the series finale, the Magic High Commission (bar Moon) ceased to be as a result of Star destroying the magic that keeps them and Glossaryck alive.

- Hekapoo, The Scissors Enforcer (voiced by Zosia Mamet) - A horned humanoid with spiky arms who forged the dimensional scissors and able to create copies of herself. Since the events of 'Running With Scissors', Hekapoo as maintained a respectful yet playful (and slightly flirtatious) relationship with Marco and is the only Commission member assisted in fighting Meteora as part of his 'Marc-nificent Seven'. She, along with Omnitraxus, Rhombulus and Moon, worked with Mina to dethrone Eclipsa. But when Mina went berserk, she spirited Star, Marco, Moon, and Eclipsa to the Tavern at the End of the Multiverse. While she later dies from Star destroying magic, Hekapoo was accepting of her fate and tells the concerned Marco that she always felt magic needed to be erased.
- Omnitraxus Prime, Master of Space-Time (voiced by Carl Weathers) - A skull-headed galaxy-themed creature and manipulator of space and time who was one of the founders of the Magic High Commission. He, along with Hekapoo, Rhombulus and Moon worked with Mina to dethrone Eclipsa.
- Lekmet, High Chancellor (voiced by Kevin Michael Richardson) - A goat-headed demon Glossaryck created who was a founder of the Magic High Commission, he spoke in a goat language that Rhombulus understands. He later dies exerting his energies to heal the rest of the Magic High Council during their fight with Toffee.
- Rhombulus (voiced by Kevin Michael Richardson) - A diamond-headed creature with sentient snake-headed arms who serves as the Magic High Commission's enforcer, able to seal others in unbreakable crystal that only he can dispel. He later, under Moon's orders, frees Globgor on Eclipsa's coronation in an attempt to discredit him and Eclipsa, only to confess his actions before being "arrested" for endangering lives. His arrest turned out to be an act, as he along Hekapoo, Omnitraxus and Moon, worked with Mina to dethrone Eclipsa.

== Works cited ==
=== Other Star vs. the Forces of Evil media ===
- Benson, Amber; Bisignano, Dominic (2017). Star and Marco's Guide to Mastering Every Dimension. Disney Press. 192pp. ISBN 978-1-4847-7419-9.
