= Star Comes to Earth =

- Star vs. the Forces of Evil episode
- Episode no.: Season 1 Episode 1a
- Directed by: Mike Mullen
- Written by: Mike Mullen
- Story by: Daron Nefcy; Dave Wasson; Jordana Arkin
- Narrated by: Eden Sher
- Production codes: 101 (Note: Disney XD Press used a three-digit production code scheme to number their episodes. "Party with a Pony" also shares this production code.); 474S-106 (Note: The production code for this episode as submitted to the U.S. Copyright office)
- Original air date: January 18, 2015 (Note: This episode premiered on Disney Channel prior to Disney XD. The episode officially premiered on Disney XD on March 30, 2015.)

Episode chronology
← Previous —	Next → "Party with a Pony"

"Star Comes to Earth" is the first segment of the first episode of the first season of the animated television series Star vs. the Forces of Evil. The episode was directed and written by Mike Mullen, with the story written by Dave Wasson, Jordana Arkin, and series creator Daron Nefcy. The episode premiered as a preview on Disney Channel on January 18, 2015; it officially premiered on Disney XD on March 30, 2015.

In "Star Comes to Earth", a princess from another dimension, named Star Butterfly (voiced by Eden Sher), is turning fourteen years old, which, by tradition, means her family's magic wand will be passed down to her. However, after she fails to properly use it, her parents deem her to not be ready for the responsibility yet, and send her to Earth for training. The episode was well received by critics and fans, prompting the second season of the series to be ordered ahead of its premiere.

== Plot ==
External videos
- Star vs. The Forces of Evil First Full Episode! | S1 E1 | Star Comes to Earth | @disneyxd — Official upload of the episode onto YouTube

The episode begins with Star Butterfly (voiced by Eden Sher) narrating. She explains who is she is: a princess from another dimension, who is often seen as being reckless due to her hobbies, such as fighting monsters. She also explains that today is her fourteenth birthday, which means she will inherit her family's magic wand. After doing so, however, she accidentally sets fire to her kingdom. After doing so, her parents decide that she "can't handle it" and send her off to Earth for training.

After Star's parents bribe the principal of Echo Creek Academy, a high school in Echo Creek, to get her enrolled in the school, the principal assigns a student, Marco Diaz (voiced by Adam McArthur), to give Star a tour of the school. Marco complains to Star of how boring his life is, and how he wishes something exciting would happen, but after Star summons a monster and explains who she is to him, he runs away in fear. When he gets home, his parents reveal that they will be taking care of Star and having her live with them as a "foreign exchange student".

A monster, who has been spying on Star, reports her location to his boss, Ludo (voiced by Alan Tudyk), whose goal is to steal Star's wand and take over the universe. Back on Earth, Star expands her bedroom into a large castle loft. When Marco wishes he had a similar room, Star attempts to create one for him, but she accidentally creates a black hole. Fed up, Marco resolves that if Star is moving in, he is moving out. After looking for Marco and finding him, she attempts to reconcile with him, but they are attacked by Ludo's army of monsters. The two fight them off together, and after defeating them, Marco, impressed by Star's fighting skills and teamwork, decides to let her live in his house.

== Production and broadcasting ==
"Star Comes to Earth" was written, directed, and story-boarded by Mike Mullen, with story by Daron Nefcy (the creator), Dave Wasson, and Jordana Arkin. The episode premiered on Disney Channel on January 18, 2015, serving as a special preview of the series. It aired along with "Party with a Pony". Disney sitcom actors Olivia Holt and Kelli Berglund participated in promoting the series the weeks before its Disney XD premiere, with Holt dressing up as Star. The Disney XD premiere was on March 30, 2015.

== Reception ==
The episode's premiere on Disney Channel was seen by 2.33 million viewers. The positive reaction on social media prompted Disney XD to order a second season of the series in February 2015, six weeks ahead of its launch of the series on Disney XD. The episode's premiere on Disney XD was seen by 1.139 million viewers. Within the first three days, it had amassed 1.2 million viewers and became Disney XD's most-watched animated series debut in the network's 15-year history. It was also the second most watched premiere show on that network behind the live-action Lab Rats series.

Kevin Johnson of The A.V. Club gave "Star Comes to Earth" a B+ rating, praising its "snappy action and energetic performances", its subversion of "princess tropes", and Star's energetic and optimistic character, although criticizing how its plot is "built on relatively flimsy excuses to its set up". He compared it to Steven Universe and Wander Over Yonder, the latter of which show creator Daron Nefcy previously worked on. The show, as presented in "Star Comes to Earth", has also been compared to Invader Zim, Ren and Stimpy, and Sailor Moon. The episode's humor has been criticized as well, being described as "trying too hard to be funny and weird", but also praised for reaching a wide demographic.

Despite the fact that Star Butterfly has many outfits throughout the series, her blue puffy princess dress, at the beginning of the series, became even more iconic, and well-received among her several fans. Due to its several cosplays and several fanarts, her blue puffy princess dress is officially considered Princess Star Butterfly's most iconic outfit, reflecting the true nature of the traditional fairytale princess, and the official Disney Princess.
