= Bobby Miller (filmmaker) =

Italian-American writer/director

Bobby Miller is a writer/director whose short film TUB world premiered at the Sundance Film Festival. It went on to play SXSW, and other film festivals around the world. His feature debut was The Cleanse. He also directed Critters Attack!, a reboot of the cult horror franchise.

== Career ==
In 2016 he wrote/directed his first feature film, The Cleanse, starring Johnny Galecki, Anna Friel, Anjelica Huston, and Oliver Platt. It world premiered at SXSW 2016 and was named one of "7 Hidden Gems in the 2016 Features Lineup" by Indiewire. His next project is called END TIMES, funded by a Kickstarter campaign. It had its world premiere at the Boston Underground Film Festival. He was also a co-writer for the Summer Camp Island episode "Time Traveling Quick Pants".

He also directed and executive produced Critters Attack!, a reboot of the cult horror franchise for Warner Brothers Home Video/SyFy, which was released in the summer of 2019.

He was an editor on Big Mouth spin-off show Human Resources.

He currently works at Rockstar Games at a voice director for GTA 6.

His debut novel, Situation Nowhere came out March 2025.

== Personal life ==
Miller is married to animator Daron Nefcy, known for creating the Disney XD cartoon Star vs. the Forces of Evil. They live in Los Angeles. In an interview with Comicbook.com, Nefcy said that a little bit of her husband was applied to character Marco Diaz.

The couple welcomed their first child, a son in 2020.
