= List of Star vs. the Forces of Evil episodes =

Star vs. the Forces of Evil is an American television series created by Daron Nefcy and produced by Disney Television Animation. The series centers on fourteen-year-old Star Butterfly, a magical princess from the dimension of Mewni who is sent to Earth by her parents, King River and Queen Moon Butterfly, when they decide she should learn to wield magic away from their world. As an exchange student on Earth, she boards at the house of Marco Diaz, whom she befriends as they both attend high school. Before the series was picked up, Nefcy had worked as an artist for Disney's Wander Over Yonder and Nickelodeon's Robot and Monster.

The first episode of the series premiered on January 18, 2015, on Disney Channel. Succeeding episodes premiered on Disney XD starting March 30, 2015. The series was renewed for a second season a month prior to its Disney XD premiere. In March 2016, the series was renewed for a third season prior to its second-season premiere scheduled for July that year. According to Nefcy, the episode "Bon Bon the Birthday Clown" marked the mid-season finale for the second season. The second half of the season aired entirely in February 2017 on weekdays, with either a half-episode segment or a full episode premiering each day. In the same month, the series was renewed for a fourth season. The show moved from Disney XD to Disney Channel for its fourth season. Reruns aired on Disney XD on an infrequent basis until 2021, and returned more regularly in January 2026.

A two-hour television film called The Battle for Mewni, which comprises the first four episodes of the third season upon being re-aired, premiered on July 15, 2017. The season concluded on April 7, 2018, with a two-part one-hour finale. The fourth and final season premiered on March 10, 2019, on Disney Channel and concluded on May 19, 2019.

== Series overview ==
Season	Segments	Episodes	Originally released		
Season	Segments	Episodes	First released	Last released	Network
1	24	13	January 18, 2015 (Note: The first episode premiered as a preview on Disney Channel. The season began its regular run on Disney XD on March 30, 2015.)	September 21, 2015	Disney XD
2	41	22	July 11, 2016	February 27, 2017	Disney XD
3	38	21	July 15, 2017	April 7, 2018	Disney XD
4	37	21	March 10, 2019	May 19, 2019	Disney Channel

== Episodes ==
- Each episode is usually broken into two 11-minute segments.

=== Season 1 (2015) ===
No. overall	No. in season	Title	Directed by	Written & storyboarded by	Story by	Original release date	Prod. code	US viewers (millions)
1a	1a	"Star Comes to Earth"	Mike Mullen	Mike Mullen	Jordana Arkin, Daron Nefcy & Dave Wasson	January 18, 2015 (Note: This episode premiered on Disney Channel prior to Disney XD. The episode premiered on Disney XD on March 30, 2015.)	101	2.33
On her 14th birthday, Princess Star Butterfly receives a magical wand, but when she sets fire to the castle, she is sent to Earth to train. There, she enrolls in Echo Creek Academy where the principal pairs her with Marco Diaz, a reputed "safe kid". Upon befriending Marco, Star ends up discovering her skills when she is attacked by Ludo and his army of monsters.
1b	1b	"Party with a Pony"	Mike Mullen	Ian Wasseluk	Daron Nefcy	January 18, 2015	101	2.33
Star receives a visit from Flying Princess Pony Head, her best friend from Mewni. Pony Head is jealous that Marco is Star's best friend on Earth. She invites Star and Marco to various dance clubs, but she competes with Marco for Star's attention and tries to strand him at a video arcade. Meanwhile, guards have been hot on Pony Head's trail. Eventually, King Pony Head arrives to have the guards take Pony Head to St. Olga's Reform School for Wayward Princesses. Star and Marco return home with Flying Princess Pony Head's dimensional scissors, now being able to travel across any dimension anytime.
2a	2a	"Matchmaker"	Aaron Hammersley	Aaron Hammersley, Lane Lueras, Daron Nefcy & Dave Stone	Jordana Arkin, Daron Nefcy & Dave Wasson	March 30, 2015	102	0.90
Star fails her first test, so she tries to play matchmaker for their math teacher Miss Skullnick to get a better grade. However, she winds up turning her into a troll. When Ludo and his minions attack, one of the monsters falls for Skullnick.
2b	2b	"School Spirit"	Aaron Hammersley	Zeus Cervas & Aaron Hammersley	Nate Federman	March 30, 2015	102	0.90
Echo Creek Academy prepares for a football game against their rival school. Marco tries to protect Ferguson, who has become the team mascot, from being kidnapped. Star takes the concept of going to battle literally, and booby traps the field with bombs, evil kittens, and giant birds.
3a	3a	"Monster Arm"	Aaron Hammersley	Aaron Hammersley & Bert Youn	Dave Wasson	April 6, 2015	103	0.83
Marco breaks his arm before a karate tournament. Star uses her wand to fix it, but transforms it into a tentacle arm. As Star tries to find a spell to reverse it, Marco begins to like his new powers associated with the arm. However, the arm harbors an evil sentience that intends to take over the world.
3b	3b	"The Other Exchange Student"	Mike Mullen	Carrie Liao	Danielle Koenig	April 6, 2015	103	0.83
When the Diaz family receives a visit by their former foreign exchange student Gustav from Scandinavia, Gustav soon becomes the family favorite with his meatballs, that Star feels neglected. She senses something is wrong when she discovers Gustav harbors some books and media about how to act like a Scandinavian in his backpack.
4a	4a	"Cheer Up, Star"	Aaron Hammersley	Dominic Bisignano, Aaron Hammersley & Carrie Liao	Jordana Arkin, Daron Nefcy & Dave Wasson	April 13, 2015	104	0.57
Star and Marco are trapped inside a tool shed by Ludo's army. As Marco tries to fashion something to fight them off, he recounts how he tried to cheer up Star because she left her phone number for her crush, a keytar-playing student named Oskar, but he has not called her back.
4b	4b	"Quest Buy"	Aaron Hammersley	Dominic Bisignano	Mike Yank	April 13, 2015	104	0.57
When Star's wand runs low on power, she and Marco visit Quest Buy, a large inter-dimensional retail store to buy a new charger. However, the location of the charger department proves extremely difficult to find and to get to. Meanwhile, Ludo and his minions, who are shopping there for a beak sharpener, pursue Star to try to take her wand.
5a	5a	"Diaz Family Vacation"	Piero Piluso	Zeus Cervas, Christopher Graham & Piero Piluso	Piero Piluso & Mike Yank	April 20, 2015	105	0.57
As an anniversary gift for Marco's parents, Star invites them and Marco to Mewni, but must avoid being seen by her father as Star is not allowed to leave Earth. While they visit a Mewni village, Star sees her father strolling about, and directs the Diaz family into a deadly forest.
5b	5b	"Brittney's Party"	Mike Mullen	Mike Mullen & Ian Wasseluk	Jordana Arkin	April 20, 2015	105	0.57
Star and Marco crash Brittney Wong's birthday event which takes place on a party bus. While Star tries to make the party "fun", Marco gets carsick. Ludo and his minions attack and hijack the bus.
6a	6a	"Mewberty"	Aaron Hammersley	Dominic Bisignano & Aaron Hammersley	Dominic Bisignano & Aaron Hammersley	June 15, 2015	106	0.74
Star experiences "mewberty", that is, her skin breaks out in hearts whenever she is near boys. Although Marco thinks it's much like the Earthling condition, Star's is more extreme. She sprouts hearts all over her body, and transforms into a butterfly creature that captures boys and steals them away. Marco turns to Glossaryck, a genie inside Star's book of magic, for advice on how to stop her.
6b	6b	"Pixtopia"	Mike Mullen	Christofer Graham, Mike Mullen & Carlos Ramos	Mike Yank	June 15, 2015	106	0.74
After making prank calls on Star's magic mirror, Marco, Alfonzo, Ferguson, and Star must go to Pixtopia: Land Of The Pixies and pay the bill. When they can't pay it, they are forced to work in a mine shaft. The Pixie Empress flirts with Ferguson.
7a	7a	"Lobster Claws"	Mike Mullen & Piero Piluso	Scott O'Brien & Piero Piluso	Nate Federman	June 22, 2015	107	0.52
Ludo fires his minion Lobster Claws after he accidentally takes off Deer Beard's antler when trying to get Star's wand. Marco tries to help Lobster Claws become good while Star thinks he cannot be reformed.
7b	7b	"Sleep Spells"	Mike Mullen	Mike Mullen & Ian Wasseluk	Danielle Koenig, Mike Mullen & Ian Wasseluk	June 22, 2015	107	0.52
Star and Marco try to determine who has been redecorating her room, with Mr. Diaz only accounting for a small project. Marco discovers that Star has been "sleep spelling", that is, casting spells when sleepwalking. He tries psychology to try to treat her but learns that she is actually trying to defend herself from an intruder, revealed to be Princess Smooshy, an ugly "goblin-elephant" princess who wants to steal Star's face so she can avoid getting sent back to St. Olga's Reform School for Wayward Princesses after escaping it. Star's Eyemask is gone.
8a	8a	"Blood Moon Ball"	Aaron Hammersley	Dominic Bisignano & Aaron Hammersley	Jordana Arkin, Dominic Bisignano, Aaron Hammersley, Daron Nefcy & Dave Wasson	July 20, 2015	108	0.67
Star's ex-boyfriend Tom invites her to the Blood Moon Ball, an Underworld event that occurs once every 667 years. Tom claims he has turned over a new leaf, having hired an anger management consultant. Marco does not believe Tom has changed but Star decides to go anyway. When Marco disrupts Tom's plan to take Star for himself under the Blood Moon's light, Tom reverts to his old self. When returning home, Star assures Marco that she can take care of herself.
8b	8b	"Fortune Cookies"	Mike Mullen	Carrie Liao & Mike Mullen	Nate Federman	July 20, 2015	108	0.67
Following yet another victory over Ludo and his minions, Marco and Star eat at a Chinese restaurant. Marco tricks Star into thinking the sayings in fortune cookies can really predict the future. Meanwhile, Ludo hires a monster named Toffee to shape up his minions. They come up with a plan to take advantage of Star's fortune cookie obsession.
9a	9a	"Freeze Day"	Mike Mullen	Carrie Liao & Mike Mullen	Mike Yank	July 27, 2015	109	0.37
Star freezes time with her wand so that Marco can appear at Echo Creek Academy on time for his morning greeting nod with his crush Jackie Lynn Thomas. But when she is unable to cancel out the effects, she and Marco visit the Plains of Time in order to get Father Time to restart time again.
9b	9b	"Royal Pain"	Piero Piluso	Piero Piluso & Ian Wasseluk	Keith Kaczorek	July 27, 2015	109	0.37
Star gets an unexpected visit from her father who had been kicked out of the house for not picking up after himself. After getting excited over Earth activities such as using a flush toilet and playing miniature golf, he ends up overstaying his welcome. He hosts a party with his inter-dimensional friends, but it is soon crashed by a sun character named Helios.
10	10	"St. Olga's Reform School for Wayward Princesses"	Piero Piluso	Piero Piluso; Carlos Ramos (additional storyboarder)	Nate Federman, Piero Piluso & Mike Yank	August 10, 2015	110	0.50
Star and Marco go undercover as new princess students in order to break Flying Princess Pony Head out of St. Olga's on her birthday. They discover that Pony Head has been brainwashed to be a compliant princess and try to evade the robot guards and the reform school's headmistress Miss Heinous.
11a	11a	"Mewnipendence Day"	Aaron Hammersley	Dominic Bisignano, Aaron Hammersley, Kyle Neswald & Carder Scholin	Dominic Bisignano, Nate Federman & Aaron Hammersley	August 17, 2015	111	0.51
Star recruits her classmates, Miss Skullnick, and the Dojo Sensei to participate in a battle reenactment of Mewni's Independence Day. Ludo and Toffee use a special floating eye device to spy on Star and her activities. Ludo's minion Buff Frog infiltrates the reenactment as one of the monsters to try to steal the wand.
11b	11b	"The Banagic Incident"	Mike Mullen	Dominic Bisignano, Nate Cash, Mike Mullen, Kyle Neswald & Carder Scholin	Mike Yank	August 17, 2015	111	0.51
Impressed by a commercial for a "magical" Earth product called a Banagic Wand, Star tries to get Marco to buy it, but Marco refuses as he has karate class. Star ends up going into town by herself where she confuses a pirate-themed restaurant for having real pirates and trashes the place. Meanwhile, Marco's Dojo Sensei wants his students to channel their emotions to walk across hot coals.
12a	12a	"Interdimensional Field Trip"	Piero Piluso	Piero Piluso & Ian Wasseluk; Aliki Grafft (additional storyboarder)	Nate Federman	September 14, 2015	112	0.55
Miss Skullnick's class finds the field trip to the Echo Creek Museum of Paper Clips boring, so Star volunteers to lead a trip to the Dimension of Wonders and Amazement. But when she lets the students do whatever they want, she puts the entire class in danger. Meanwhile, Miss Skullnick visits an exhibit on troll history. When a yarn monster captures the class, Star and Miss Skullnick must work together to save them.
12b	12b	"Marco Grows a Beard"	Mike Mullen & Piero Piluso	Tyler Chen	Mike Yank	September 14, 2015	112	0.55
Star botches a spell that would help Marco grow a beard in order to impress Jackie Lynn Thomas. The hair grows out of control, engulfing the house, and Star loses her wand in the midst of it. Meanwhile, Ludo leads his minions through the overgrown beard to find the wand.
13	13	"Storm the Castle"	Aaron Hammersley	Dominic Bisignano, Christopher Graham, Aaron Hammersley & Ian Wasseluk	Dominic Bisignano, Nate Federman, Aaron Hammersley, Daron Nefcy & Mike Yank	September 21, 2015	113	0.68
Toffee has taken over Ludo's castle; he has one of Ludo's minions abduct Marco. Star allies with Buff Frog (and the kicked-out Ludo) to storm the castle and beat up Ludo's former minions and free Marco. However, Toffee arranges for the box imprisoning Marco to gradually collapse, forcing Star to destroy her wand in exchange for sparing Marco. The resulting explosion destroys Ludo's castle and Toffee, after which Star banishes Ludo. Star is left with a new wand, with half of her star still on Mewni.

=== Season 2 (2016–17) ===
No. overall	No. in season	Title	Directed by	Written & storyboarded by	Story by	Original release date	Prod. code	US viewers (millions)
14a	1a	"My New Wand!"	Dominic Bisignano & Aaron Hammersley	Dominic Bisignano, Evon Freeman & Aaron Hammersley	Dominic Bisignano, Aaron Hammersley & Daron Nefcy	July 11, 2016	201	0.61
As Marco gets out of the shower, Star activates her new wand, but it accidentally knocks Marco, her wand, and her book of spells into her closet. Unable to open the closet door, Star consults with Glossaryck who suggests she digs deep into her soul to use magic without her wand. Meanwhile, as Marco is advised by Glossaryck to sort out the secrets and stuff in Star's closet. When he finds and starts reading Star's journal, Star panics and unleashes her innate magic, which unlocks the door and frees Marco.
14b	1b	"Ludo in the Wild"	Dominic Bisignano & Aaron Hammersley	Dominic Bisignano, Aaron Hammersley & Jushtin Lee	Dominic Bisignano, Aaron Hammersley & Daron Nefcy	July 11, 2016	201	0.61
After the destruction of his castle, Ludo is thrown into the cosmos by Star and lands in a forested location. He competes with a giant spider as they go ice fishing. When a bag of potato chips is found, he and the giant spider fight until he wins. He also tames a bald eagle. When he spots Star in the woods, he chases her until he realizes he is back on Mewni. He also obtains a wand of his own which holds the other half of Star's wand magic.
15a	2a	"Mr. Candle Cares"	Giancarlo Volpe	Le Tang & Giancarlo Volpe	Dominic Bisignano, Katie Crown, Aaron Hammersley & Daron Nefcy	July 18, 2016	202	0.56
Guidance counselor Mr. Candle tells Star that she is fated to be Queen of Mewni. She has to read her mother's book on how to act like a queen but she gets frustrated and decides to dress up in a more rebellious punk style. Meanwhile, Marco, who is displeased of Candle's career suggestion of being the head janitor on Garbage Island, discovers that Mr. Candle is actually in cahoots with Tom, who planned to ensure "Starco" doesn't happen. He confronts Mr. Candle but is captured by Tom, and must duel Tom to get his freedom.
15b	2b	"Red Belt"	Piero Piluso	John Mathot & Piero Piluso	Dominic Bisignano, Aaron Hammersley, Amy Higgins, John Infantino & Daron Nefcy	July 18, 2016	202	0.56
Marco trains for a red belt in karate. However, after visiting his sensei's home, he discovers his sensei lives with his mother and does not even have a red belt. Sensei explains that he never got to watch the instructional video for the red belt as the tape got jammed in his video player. Marco and sensei visit thrift shops and eventually come across a rare video store where they have to defeat the store owner to win the tape. Meanwhile, Star looks all over the house for a hammer in order to put up a new poster that she just obtained.
16a	3a	"Star on Wheels"	Piero Piluso	Zach Marcus & Brett Varon	Dominic Bisignano, Aaron Hammersley, Amy Higgins, John Infantino & Daron Nefcy	July 25, 2016	203	0.54
Marco teaches Star how to ride a bicycle, but Star does not know how to stop. To make things worse, she refuses to listen to Marco's request to pedal backwards since Marco had tricked Star into thinking he would not let go of the bike. Marco gets a car ride with Oskar as they pursue Star to get her the wand. Glossaryck appears and joins in the fun.
16b	3b	"Fetch"	Dominic Bisignano & Aaron Hammersley	Dominic Bisignano, Evon Freeman, Aaron Hammersley & Aleth Romanillos	Dominic Bisignano, Aaron Hammersley, Amalia Levari & Daron Nefcy	July 25, 2016	203	0.54
Star throws her wand by accident and it ends up in the mouth of a growling dog who refuses to let it go. She has to take care of the dog and find its owner. Meanwhile, Marco struggles to get a straw into his juice box and has to take care of the laser puppies. She eventually discovers the dog named Willoughby is actually an extra-dimensional being who didn't like life on her planet, so Star has her adopted by a strange lady named Lydia.
17a	4a	"Star vs. Echo Creek"	Giancarlo Volpe	Dominic Bisignano, Sage Cotugno, (Note: Credited in the series as Sabrina Cotugno; Cotugno is non-binary and announced their name change in 2023.); Amelia Lorenz, Le Tang & Giancarlo Volpe	Dominic Bisignano, Todd Casey, Aaron Hammersley & Daron Nefcy	August 1, 2016	204	0.50
After getting a sugar high from seasoning her burrito with sugar, Star sets off some magic that accidentally causes a sign to fall and crush a police cruiser. While trying to evade the police, Star encounters a woman by the river bank named Brigid who likes making things out of discarded hair and taking care of injured animals. She later encounters an underwater sea creature who tells her that hiding out is a good thing, but it is revealed the creature is actually her own conscience trying to convince her that she hasn't made a big mistake. Missing her family and friends, she returns to a very worried Marco and turns herself in to the police who have her wash the other squad cars as part of her police-supervised community service.
17b	4b	"Wand to Wand"	Giancarlo Volpe	Dominic Bisignano, Aaron Hammersley, Le Tang & Giancarlo Volpe	Dominic Bisignano, Aaron Hammersley, Amy Higgins, John Infantino & Daron Nefcy	August 1, 2016	204	0.50
Star tries to use her wand to clean up the Diaz home before Marco's parents return, but ends up summoning a whimsical cloud that makes an even bigger mess. Meanwhile, Ludo tries to activate his wand so he can fight off some rats at a tavern, learning that it works when he gets beat up and enraged.
18a	5a	"Starstruck"	Dominic Bisignano & Aaron Hammersley	Tyler Chen	Dominic Bisignano, Aaron Hammersley, Daron Nefcy & Suzie Vleck	August 8, 2016	205	0.50
While foraging for donuts that are being tossed at the end of the day, Star encounters Mina Loveberry, a magical girl from Mewni who is Star's idol. Mina has been living as a homeless person on Earth. Star follows Mina and tries to train in her ways, which annoys Marco. At a park, when Mina announces she plans to take over the world, the people decide to hold a vote on whether Mina should rule, and Star is left to break the tie.
18b	5b	"Camping Trip"	John Infantino & Piero Piluso	John Infantino, Brandon Kruse & Piero Piluso	Dominic Bisignano, Aaron Hammersley, Amy Higgins, John Infantino, Ben Joseph & Daron Nefcy	August 8, 2016	205	0.50
Marco wants to show Star the geyser "Old Youthful" during a Diaz camping trip. King Butterfly joins them on the trip to learn what Earth camping is like. But, King Butterfly's antics get him in trouble several times with the park ranger. When Marco reveals he wanted to show Star the geyser, and the ranger says it's likely the last time it will ever erupt, the three try to rush there to see it.
19a	6a	"Starsitting"	Piero Piluso	Zach Marcus & Brett Varon	Dominic Bisignano, Aaron Hammersley, Amy Higgins, John Infantino & Daron Nefcy	August 15, 2016	206	0.36
Star and Marco are put in charge of watching Buff Frog's tadpoles. Marco wants to follow the Buff Baby handbook, while Star just wants to cuddle them and poke at them. Things get complicated when the tadpoles sprout their legs and hop around.
19b	6b	"On the Job"	Piero Piluso	John Mathot & Piero Piluso	Dominic Bisignano, Aaron Hammersley, Amy Higgins, John Infantino & Daron Nefcy	August 15, 2016	206	0.36
While Star and Marco are babysitting his tadpoles, Buff Frog goes on a mission with Boo Fly and other monsters on finding who has been stealing Mewnian corn, but he keeps thinking about his tadpoles during the job, causing him to be a little distracted and klutzy.
20a	7a	"Goblin Dogs"	Dominic Bisignano & Aaron Hammersley	Dominic Bisignano, Evon Freeman, John Infantino & Aleth Romanillos	Dominic Bisignano, Nate Federman, Aaron Hammersley, Amy Higgins, John Infantino, Amalia Levari & Daron Nefcy	September 12, 2016	207	0.51
Star, Marco, Pony Head, and a bush-themed female named Kelly go to an unidentified desert-themed dimension to purchase a Goblin Dog (a goblin version of a hot dog). They end up having a hard time when they must deal with the various jobs of the goblin vendor Roy and the many lines that lead to the Goblin Dog truck.
20b	7b	"By the Book"	Giancarlo Volpe	Sage Cotugno & Amelia Lorenz	Dominic Bisignano, Aaron Hammersley, Amy Higgins, John Infantino & Daron Nefcy	September 12, 2016	207	0.51
Star has not been following the advice of Glossaryck when it comes to mastering new spells causing the two of them to have a falling out. Marco does various things in order to get Star and Glossaryck to reconcile. Meanwhile, Ludo hears the voices from within the wand that tell him what he needs to master his wand.
21a	8a	"Game of Flags"	Piero Piluso	Evon Freeman, John Mathot & Piero Piluso	Dominic Bisignano, Aaron Hammersley, Amy Higgins, John Infantino & Daron Nefcy	September 19, 2016	208	0.29
During a reunion between Star's parents' families – the Butterflies and the Johansens – Star is placed at the kids' table. The two families compete in Flags, a king of the hill game where whoever plants their flag atop a dangerous hill full of obstacles gets to look down on the rival family members for a year. Against the wishes of her mother, Star fashions a decoy at the table and participates in Flags. Marco tries to keep up with Star and later tries to convince her to stop when he realizes how serious the participants are in winning.
21b	8b	"Girls' Day Out"	Giancarlo Volpe	Dominic Bisignano, Aaron Hammersley, Le Tang & Giancarlo Volpe	Dominic Bisignano, Aaron Hammersley, Amy Higgins, John Infantino & Daron Nefcy	September 19, 2016	208	0.29
Star is sent to detention for disrupting Miss Skullnick's class when she frees the class's pet hamster Marisol. Although she could easily escape, she is convinced by Janna and the other detention students that she is the Mayor of Detention, and is assigned to help the students out with their needs. She helps all of them except for Toby, a kid who wants replacement batteries for his remote so he can watch a pro wrestling show on TV. Star and Janna try to find replacement batteries by sneaking out to Oskar and getting ones from his keytar. Meanwhile, Marco is tasked to find Marisol and gets his hand stuck in a drain pipe.
22a	9a	"Sleepover"	Piero Piluso	Zach Marcus & Brett Varon	Dominic Bisignano, Aaron Hammersley, Amy Higgins, John Infantino & Daron Nefcy	September 26, 2016	209	0.27
Star hosts a sleepover with her girl classmates (Janna, Jackie, & Starfan13) and Pony Head. They recruit Marco to play a truth or dare game called "Truth or Punishment", where the Truth or Punishment cube administers punishments to everyone when someone lies, and refuses to free everyone until the game is over. The cube's final question is who is their greatest crush. Marco admits he likes Jackie, but the cube insists someone has lied, and informs that Marco wasn't the one who lied. When Star makes a monologue to the cube about how a person's mind and heart disagree, and how feelings are always changing, the cube starts to malfunction after Star makes some examples and self-destructs. After everyone goes home, the discarded cube springs to life one last time, answering the question about Star's crush, but it gets destroyed before the audience gets a clear answer.
22b	9b	"Gift of the Card"	Dominic Bisignano & Aaron Hammersley	Annisa Adjani & Natasha Kline	Dominic Bisignano, Aaron Hammersley, Amy Higgins, John Infantino & Daron Nefcy	September 26, 2016	209	0.27
After having lost her job at St. Olga's Reform School for Wayward Princesses, Miss Heinous hires a lizard-man bounty hunter named Rasticore to destroy Princess Star and to capture "Princess Marco". Star begs Marco to use his Quest Buy gift card. Marco agrees, but because it's a "friends to the end" card, he has to use it on something he really wants, and if he doesn't redeem it by midnight when it expires, they will expire too.
23a	10a	"Friendenemies"	Giancarlo Volpe	Sage Cotugno & Amelia Lorenz	Dominic Bisignano, Aaron Hammersley, Amy Higgins, John Infantino & Daron Nefcy	October 3, 2016	210	0.51
Tom invites Marco to a movie marathon featuring Mackie Hands, Marco's favorite kung-fu film star. They start to become friends on the way there after learning they both like Mackie Hands and a band called Love Sentence, but when Marco wants to leave to catch the marathon, Tom refuses to let him go, and gets angry, voiding his chance to earn an anger management graduation badge. Tom apologizes and tries to win back Marco with a Love Sentence song, and then raises Mackie Hands from the dead. Although they cannot get into the theatre, Tom and Marco watch Mackie lay a beatdown on the movie's security guards.
23b	10b	"Is Mystery"	Dominic Bisignano & Aaron Hammersley	Mark Ackland, Dominic Bisignano, Riccardo Durante & Jushtin Lee	Dominic Bisignano, Aaron Hammersley, Amy Higgins, John Infantino & Daron Nefcy	October 3, 2016	210	0.51
Buff Frog attempts to solve a mystery of a hole in the wall guarding the cornfield when he gets captured by Meat Fork, a humanoid warthog monster with a fork for a left hand. Upon being put to work to grind corn, Buff Frog frees himself to discover who is enslaving the monsters. He encounters the rats as well as Ludo, who offers him Meat Fork's job. Buff Frog refuses and escapes with Meat Fork. Buff Frog decides he will warn Star that Ludo is back.
24a	11a	"Hungry Larry"	Dominic Bisignano & Aaron Hammersley	Mark Ackland, Dominic Bisignano, Riccardo Durante & Aaron Hammersley	Dominic Bisignano, Aaron Hammersley, Amy Higgins, John Infantino, Bobby Miller & Daron Nefcy	October 10, 2016	214	0.26
After Mr. Diaz fails to scare some kids with his haunted house, Star and Janna summon Hungry Larry, reputed to be a very scary spirit, to haunt the house. Janna goes missing and screams attract the kids back to the house. But the kids get scared and go missing; Star and Marco are attacked. Mr. Diaz arrives to find Hungry Larry has eaten everyone, and rescues them.
24b	11b	"Spider with a Top Hat"	Piero Piluso	Zach Marcus, Piero Piluso & Brett Varon	Dominic Bisignano, Aaron Hammersley, Amy Higgins, John Infantino & Daron Nefcy	October 10, 2016	214	0.26
Spider With a Top Hat has been entertaining Star's wand monsters at a party. Afterwards, he tries to learn a fighting move where he tries to blast through a wall. Despite getting training from Narwahl and Rock, he is unable to break through the wall. The other monsters are summoned for a fight but they are beaten up. Encouraged by Rock's words, Spider is finally called to fight a monster'.
25a	12a	"Into the Wand"	Dominic Bisignano & Aaron Hammersley	Dominic Bisignano, Aaron Hammersley & Jushtin Lee	Dominic Bisignano, Aaron Hammersley, Amy Higgins, John Infantino, Amalia Levari & Daron Nefcy	November 7, 2016	211	0.22
Star's wand malfunctions, making a mess of her spell casting. Glossaryck tells Star that this is a result of there being something inside the wand that does not belong there and that in order to fix it she must go inside to remove said something. Inside Star finds memorials to past queens, including her mother, who is revealed to have fought Toffee and cut off his finger, as well as the ancient queen Eclipsa, who married a monster. Star eventually exits the wand after removing the something that does not belong inside of it, which is revealed to be Toffee's missing finger.
25b	12b	"Pizza Thing"	Piero Piluso	Evon Freeman, John Mathot, Piero Piluso & Cassie Zwart	Dominic Bisignano, Aaron Hammersley, Amy Higgins, John Infantino & Daron Nefcy	November 7, 2016	211	0.22
Star, Marco, and Pony Head are about to have a Friendship Thursday by curling up under a blanket on the sofa and watching a television show. Pony Head finds the concept boring and tags along with Marco to pick up a pizza from Emilio's shop. But problems arise when Pony Head gets distracted with buying some skinny jeans, inadvertently confuses a taxi ride with a carjacking, and when Marco makes a casual remark about Emilio's pizza that Emilio takes to heart.
26a	13a	"Page Turner"	Piero Piluso	Zach Marcus & Brett Varon	Dominic Bisignano, Aaron Hammersley, Amy Higgins, John Infantino & Daron Nefcy	November 14, 2016	212	0.36
Glossaryck lets Star pick any page in the book to learn some new magic. Star chooses a mysterious chapter, but Glossaryck tells her it is very dark magic and that he will only let her get a short peek at the page. However, Glossaryck is summoned to the Bureau of Magic; he tells Star not to turn to that page, and his consciousness is dragged away into another dimension. While Glossaryck must deal with a not-so-helpful receptionist and has a difficult time getting to the top floor because the magic system is "on the fritz", Star is tempted to turn the page, and enlists Marco to help do it.
26b	13b	"Naysaya"	Giancarlo Volpe	Dominic Bisignano, Evon Freeman, Aaron Hammersley, John Infantino, Le Tang & Giancarlo Volpe	Dominic Bisignano, Aaron Hammersley, Amy Higgins, John Infantino & Daron Nefcy	November 14, 2016	212	0.36
Marco shyly tries to ask Jackie Lynn Thomas out on a date but finds that he is blurting out embarrassing things about himself. He then discovers he has sprouted a small little head out of the side of his neck that is saying all those things. It is a Naysaya, a curse that Tom had placed on Marco so that Marco would not be able to ask out Star. The Naysaya can only go away when it is appeased, so Marco tries giving it what it wants, which is some cereal, but it doesn't go away. Marco meets Jackie again but the Naysaya starts to act up, so Marco decides to spill out all his insecurities in front of Jackie in an impassionate monologue.
27	14	"Bon Bon the Birthday Clown"	Giancarlo Volpe	Dominic Bisignano, Sage Cotugno, Aaron Hammersley, Amelia Lorenz & Le Tang	Dominic Bisignano, Aaron Hammersley, Amy Higgins, John Infantino & Daron Nefcy	November 21, 2016	213	0.53
Star and Janna plan a séance to bring back the spirit of Bon Bon, a clown who had died 100 years ago, but the event coincides with a school dance that Star had planned to go with Marco. Star lets Marco go to the dance with Jackie, who finds the dance boring but changes it to a date instead at a park. During the seance, when Janna falls asleep, Star checks up on Marco with a spy spell, only to find that he and Jackie are having a good time together, which makes her jealous. Star is surprised by Ludo, who steals Star's spellbook. Marco and Jackie share a kiss under the Blood Moon light, but when they hear Star in trouble they rush to help her. They pull Star from being sucked through a portal, and Star tearfully cries about the loss of the spell book and Glossaryck. Glossaryck wakes up to find Ludo as his new master.
28a	15a	"Raid the Cave"	Giancarlo Volpe	Sage Cotugno & Amelia Lorenz	Dominic Bisignano, Aaron Hammersley, Amy Higgins, John Infantino & Daron Nefcy	February 6, 2017	215	0.12
Star tries to find Ludo and retrieve the Book of Spells. She packs a large amount of stuff and goes to Buff Frog, who gives Star and Marco a map of Ludo's hideout. There they find some monsters that have taken over the place but see no sign of Ludo. Star uses the seeing eye spell to find Glossaryck and pleads with him to come back, but he refuses, saying that he belongs to the book, and the book belongs to Ludo now, despite the fact that he stole it.
28b	15b	"Trickstar"	Dominic Bisignano & Aaron Hammersley	Jushtin Lee & Sarah Oleksyk	Dominic Bisignano, Aaron Hammersley, Amy Higgins, John Infantino & Daron Nefcy	February 7, 2017	215	N/A
Star and Marco attend the birthday party for Marco's sensei. Star becomes suspicious of magician-for-hire Preston Change-O, who, after every magic trick he does, seems to be taking something spiritual from the person, and that his hat is becoming longer and longer. She discovers that Preston has the ability to steal joy from people, so she warns him not to do so or else she'll blast him, but Preston does it anyway. When Star tells everyone what is happening, the audience is angry with Star for ruining the magic show and leaves. Sensei talks about his feelings and then informs Star and Marco that he put Preston in the trunk, but when they open it, Preston has disappeared.
29a	16a	"Baby"	Giancarlo Volpe	Evon Freeman & Le Tang	Eric Acosta, Dominic Bisignano, Aaron Hammersley, Amy Higgins, John Infantino & Daron Nefcy	February 8, 2017	216	0.20
Moon sends a fairy named Baby to evaluate Star. Star takes this very seriously, as failing means that she would have to return to Mewni. Unfortunately, Baby ultimately fails Star due to her "Closet of Secrets", broken wand, losing the Book of Spells and failing in basic magic, like levitating an apple. However, as Baby turns to leave, the apple Star failed to levitate suddenly grows into a tree, causing her to change her mind and pass her. Later, Baby reports to Moon that, despite her faults, Star's magic potential is far above what hers was at her age, adding that it might be comparable with the ancient queen Eclipsa.
29b	16b	"Running with Scissors"	Piero Piluso	Gina Gress & John Mathot	Dominic Bisignano, Aaron Hammersley, Amy Higgins, John Infantino & Daron Nefcy	February 9, 2017	216	0.19
Marco borrows Star's Dimensional Scissors to find a place to walk the laser puppies, but he soon becomes accustomed to its conveniences, opening a bunch of portals from his bed to access things. Hekapoo, the forger of all of the Dimensional Scissors, pulls Marco into her dimension and confiscates the Scissors as they did not belong to him or Star (Pony Head had stolen them and gave them to Star). Marco must earn the scissors by having to blow out the flame atop Hekapoo's head. Star goes to Hekapoo's dimension to recover Marco, who had chased Hekapoo for 16 years before winning the challenge. When they return, Marco reverts to his teenage body as only eight minutes have passed on Earth time.
30a	17a	"Mathmagic"	Dominic Bisignano & Aaron Hammersley	Mark Ackland & Riccardo Durante	Dominic Bisignano, Aaron Hammersley, Amy Higgins, John Infantino, Christian Magalhaes, Daron Nefcy & Robert Snow	February 13, 2017	217	0.16
Star is called to solve a problem in Miss Skullnick's math class, but she refuses to do it. She tries to cast some magic to get out of it but ends up in a time loop. However with each iteration, the scenario is slightly different. Star goes to Father Time's dimension, but Father Time is too busy to help her, and she gets advice from Omnitraxus Prime, who is in charge of space-time. Star must solve the problem or her world will fall apart.
30b	17b	"The Bounce Lounge"	Piero Piluso & Brett Varon	Zach Marcus & Brett Varon	Dominic Bisignano, Aaron Hammersley, Amy Higgins, John Infantino & Daron Nefcy	February 14, 2017	217	0.20
Pony Head tells Star the bad news that the Bounce Lounge, their favorite partying venue, is closing. Star and Pony Head round up their former Bounce Lounge posse. They start partying and raise enough funds to save the place, however the owner Milly tells them that she is still closing the place because she is tired from having partied over 5,000 years. Afterwards, the Bounce Crew members and Marco take a group picture in a photo booth that Ponyhead took from the lounge.
31a	18a	"Crystal Clear"	Giancarlo Volpe	Sage Cotugno & Amelia Lorenz	Dominic Bisignano, Aaron Hammersley, Amy Higgins, John Infantino & Daron Nefcy	February 15, 2017	218	0.23
Rhombulus captures Star and Marco and encases them in crystal, believing that the former is the cause of the glitches that are affecting the dimensions. When he inadvertently encases his boss, and then his own hands for wanting to tell the high council, he unfreezes Star and shares his predicament. Star agrees not to tell the high council about the situation provided that Rhombulus not tell them about Star's losing the Book of Spells and Glossaryck.
31b	18b	"The Hard Way"	Dominic Bisignano & Aaron Hammersley	Sarah Oleksyk & Cassie Zwart	Dominic Bisignano, Aaron Hammersley, Amy Higgins, John Infantino & Daron Nefcy	February 16, 2017	218	0.21
Glossaryck agrees to teach Ludo stuff from the Book of Spells. He first makes Ludo do some physical exercises as Ludo wanted to learn the hard way. Ludo learns and masters a levitation spell and is quite proud of his accomplishment. But when he learns there is a secret chapter that Glossaryck withheld from him but showed Star, he makes Glossaryck unlock them. Ludo reads the forbidden chapter and gains some dark magic, but when he talks with Glossaryck, he now has the voice of Toffee, who has possessed him.
32a	19a	"Heinous"	Brett Varon	Gina Gress & John Mathot	Dominic Bisignano, Aaron Hammersley, Amy Higgins, John Infantino & Daron Nefcy	February 20, 2017	219	0.25
The Diaz family receives a visit from Miss Heinous along with her butler and the still-living, still regenerating arm of her pet bounty hunter, Rastacore. Heinous wants "Princess Marco" to pay for causing the students at St. Olga's to rebel and to kick Heinous out, leaving her living out of a car. The Diaz parents are hoping this can get settled so that they can have dinner with the Morrisons. Marco tries to convince a policeman that stopped by that Heinous is evil but fails. After Heinous negotiates with Marco's parents over the kind of punishment, Marco agrees to make a video statement apologizing for his expressions of individuality and for the princesses to go back to conforming.
32b	19b	"All Belts are Off"	Giancarlo Volpe	Evon Freeman & Le Tang	Dominic Bisignano, Bryan Caselli, Aaron Hammersley, Amy Higgins, John Infantino & Daron Nefcy	February 21, 2017	219	0.21
Dojo-sensei informs his class that they are going to receive a visit from the Grandmaster of their How-To-Karate video series. When he chooses Jeremy to represent the dojo, Marco gets upset and tries to convince Sensei otherwise, but Sensei sticks with his choice. Marco gathers video evidence of Jeremy's shenanigans, and is about to share it with Sensei on the day of the demonstration, but realizing it isn't honorable, he apologizes. Sensei tells Marco that he chose Jeremy because his parents fund the dojo and that he thinks of Marco as a friend. Grandmaster falls asleep during the presentation but wakes up and certifies the dojo.
33a	20a	"Collateral Damage"	Dominic Bisignano & Aaron Hammersley	Tyler Chen & Jushtin Lee	Dominic Bisignano, Bryan Caselli, Aaron Hammersley, Amy Higgins, John Infantino & Daron Nefcy	February 22, 2017	220	N/A
Star and Janna are cleaning up the school grounds when Star mistakenly picks up the school's possum statue and drops it in the trash where it crumbles into dust. The entire school is devastated. Star tries to make a replacement statue, but it lacks the scratches and dents that gave the original statue its character. After Marco shares the history behind the founding of Echo Creek and the reason for the statue, Star tries to convince everyone to change their perspective on their history so as to make the statue not important anymore.
33b	20b	"Just Friends"	Brett Varon	Zach Marcus & Brett Varon	Dominic Bisignano, Aaron Hammersley, Amy Higgins, John Infantino & Daron Nefcy	February 23, 2017	220	N/A
Star surprises Marco with tickets to a Love Sentence concert, but also invites Jackie. Star and Jackie start bonding from wearing similar t-shirts and riding skateboards to the concert where they stop and help an animal in the creek. Marco starts to feel bad about the mishaps he caused and wants them to go on without him, but Jackie and Star convince him otherwise. At the concert, everyone is having fun until couples start kissing, and when Jackie and Marco engage in a kiss, Star decides to let the two be. As Star leaves the concert, she fires a blast of tainted magic, destroying a billboard.
34	21	"Face the Music" (Part 1)	Giancarlo Volpe	Dominic Bisignano, Sage Cotugno, Aaron Hammersley, Amelia Lorenz, Sarah Oleksyk & Cassie Zwart	Dominic Bisignano, Aaron Hammersley, Amy Higgins, John Infantino, Daron Nefcy & Chris Walsh	February 27, 2017	221	0.32
Songstrel Ruberiot is tasked to write a song about Star for the traditional Mewman Song Day. However, Star is reluctant to participate as it portrays princesses as being perfect, until Ruberiot reveals he wants to sing about the real her. Meanwhile, Moon visits Ludo's parents and with help from his brother, Dennis, learns that he is at the monster temple and in possession of the other half of Star's wand. On Song Day, a large crowd, including Marco, Star's parents and the Magic High Commission, gather to hear Star's song. However, the song reveals that she lost the Book of Spells and has a crush on Marco. These revelations cause the crowd to riot while the Commission gets angry at Moon for withholding information. Marco confronts Star about Ruberiot's claim that she has a crush on him, causing her to run off.
35	22	"Starcrushed" (Part 2)	Dominic Bisignano & Aaron Hammersley	Dominic Bisignano, Tyler Chen, Evon Freeman, Gina Gress, Aaron Hammersley, John Mathot & Le Tang	Dominic Bisignano, Aaron Hammersley, Amy Higgins, John Infantino & Daron Nefcy	February 27, 2017	222	0.40
As Star and Marco's class holds an end-of-the year party at Marco's house, the two struggle to reconnect following the previous episode. Star talks to Ponyhead, Janna, Kelly and Starfan13, and they convince her to ditch the party and instead attend another party, where she meets Oskar. Meanwhile, Moon and the Magic High Commission invade the monster temple to take back the other half of Star's wand and the Book of Spells from Ludo. However, Toffee takes control of Ludo's body and drains the souls of Moon and the Commission members. In response, Commission member Lekmet sacrifices himself to revive Moon, allowing her to escape with the remaining Commission members. When Star returns from the party, she is confronted by Moon, who tells her that she must leave Earth due to the situation. Before leaving, Star makes a tearful speech to the rest of the class and Marco about that she had a crush on him all along, much to everyone's shock, and expresses that she has to leave and says goodbye to everyone. A shocked Marco chases after Star, only to find her room vanishing to thin air as Star leaves Earth for good.

=== Season 3 (2017–18) ===
No. overall	No. in season	Title	Directed by	Written & storyboarded by	Story by	Original release date	Prod. code	U.S. viewers (millions)
36a	1a	"Return to Mewni" (Part 1)	Dominic Bisignano & Aaron Hammersley	Dominic Bisignano, Aaron Hammersley, Zach Marcus & Cassie Zwart	Dominic Bisignano, Bryan Caselli, Aaron Hammersley, Amy Higgins, John Infantino & Daron Nefcy	July 15, 2017	301	0.51
As Marco's parents try to console him about Star leaving, Star and Moon try to take the Magic High Commission to the sanctuary, but their carriage breaks down due to the fritz. They encounter some of Ludo's rats, who attempt to abduct the still soulless Commission members, but they fight them off. They eventually reach the sanctuary, but the well spring that is supposed to revive the Commission has been affected by the fritz. Moon urges Star to stay in the Sanctuary, to which she objects until Moon reveals that Toffee killed her mother. She then begins telling Star the story of how she defeated Toffee with help from Eclipsa, who she reveals is still alive.
36b	1b	"Moon the Undaunted" (Part 2)	Dominic Bisignano, Aaron Hammersley & Giancarlo Volpe	Dominic Bisignano, Sage Cotugno, Kristen Gish & Aaron Hammersley	Dominic Bisignano, Bryan Caselli, Aaron Hammersley, Amy Higgins, John Infantino & Daron Nefcy	July 15, 2017	301	0.51
Moon shares her story revolving around the death of her mother (Star's grandmother) at the hand of Toffee when she was a teenager. Moon was set to decide between signing a peace treaty or going to war against the monster army, led by Toffee. Since Toffee is immortal, Moon approaches Eclipsa, who is revealed to have been held in suspended animation inside a crystal prison for 300 years, to learn a dark magic that can destroy him. They forge a magic pact: in return for Eclipsa teaching Moon the magic, she would be set free once Toffee is defeated. She then confronts Toffee and uses the dark magic. However, she aims for his finger severing it, which he is unable to regenerate. Seeing their immortal leader wounded causes the monster army to panic and flee with Toffee following suit.
37a	2a	"Book Be Gone" (Part 3)	Brett Varon	Madeleine Flores, Brett Varon & Nicolette Wood	Dominic Bisignano, Bryan Caselli, Aaron Hammersley, Amy Higgins, John Infantino & Daron Nefcy	July 15, 2017	302	0.51
Ludo, who wakes up to find his wand is now fused with his hand, is told by Glossaryck how he (technically Toffee) defeated the Magic High Commission. Ludo wants to celebrate by writing his story into the Book of Spells, but the book no longer recognizes him as its owner and will not let him. After multiple failed attempts and different approaches, he ultimately throws the book into a fire in a fit of rage, destroying it along with Glossaryck. While Ludo is initially horrified at what he had done, Toffee, through the wand, convinces him that the book was a distraction and that he is now ready to take Butterfly Castle.
37b	2b	"Marco and the King" (Part 4)	Dominic Bisignano & Aaron Hammersley	Dominic Bisignano, Jushtin Lee & Amelia Lorenz	Dominic Bisignano, Bryan Caselli, Aaron Hammersley, Amy Higgins, John Infantino & Daron Nefcy	July 15, 2017	302	0.51
King River tries to take care of the kingdom by partying it up every day, but he and his subjects wear down quickly. Marco arrives, but River has to deal with angry villagers as well as a large monster who approaches the castle after he yelled at it to leave. River tries to hide, but Marco encourages him to stand up to the monster. River rallies the villagers to fight the monster, and it is revealed that the monster thought River was beckoning it to come to the castle, not to go away. It leaves peacefully, but as River is about to have a party to celebrate, Ludo and his minions appear and they take over the kingdom.
38a	3a	"Puddle Defender" (Part 5)	Tyler Chen & Giancarlo Volpe	Tyler Chen, Gina Gress & Sarah Oleksyk	Dominic Bisignano, Bryan Caselli, Aaron Hammersley, Amy Higgins, John Infantino & Daron Nefcy	July 15, 2017	303	0.51
With the sanctuary flooded with sludge, Star and Queen Moon flee and find a new hiding place at Buff Frog's. Star wants to sneak out to fight, so she gets Buff Frog to distract Moon with some monster board games such as Puddle Defender, which Moon realizes is biased towards Mewmans, and Buff Frog accuses Moon of being biased towards monsters. After a heated argument, they eventually reconcile, and Buff Frog blows Star's cover and forbids her from leaving. However, Buff's youngest tadpole, Katrina, later sneaks Star out.
38b	3b	"King Ludo" (Part 6)	Brett Varon	Casey Crowe, Evon Freeman & Brett Varon	Dominic Bisignano, Bryan Caselli, Aaron Hammersley, Amy Higgins, John Infantino & Daron Nefcy	July 15, 2017	303	0.51
Ludo has taken over the kingdom, and has imprisoned Marco and River, but he finds that he is not popular at all among the kingdom's villagers. He tells River to make him popular or else he will levitate him into the sky. Marco uses a stick of butter that Ludo left to free himself, but River has eaten his part of the butter which leaves Marco with no choice but to steal Ludo's key. He meets with some of the court entertainers, and they steal the key, but River refuses to escape. Ludo levitates River into the sky while Marco and the entertainers conspire what to do next.
39	4	"Toffee" (Part 7)	Dominic Bisignano, Tyler Chen & Aaron Hammersley	Dominic Bisignano, Tyler Chen, Sage Cotugno, Kristen Gish, Aaron Hammersley, Zach Marcus & Cassie Zwart	Dominic Bisignano, Bryan Caselli, Aaron Hammersley, Amy Higgins, John Infantino & Daron Nefcy	July 15, 2017	304	0.51
Star gets captured while attacking Ludo, but she also realizes Toffee's manipulation. Marco and the entertainers try to rescue her, only to get captured themselves. While Moon and Buff Frog rescue Marco, Ludo realizes something is wrong and asks Star about his wand. Star uses the whispering spell, causing a huge explosion that transports her to the Realm of Magic. Here she encounters Toffee, who reveals that the fritz is a result of him corrupting the realm. Toffee talks to Moon through Ludo and they make a deal; Toffee's finger for Star. Toffee is revived, but he doesn't honor the deal. Star desperately searches the Realm of Magic for untainted magic, eventually finding some with Glossaryck's help. She is then revived with a new wand and Mewberty form and gravely injures Toffee, allowing Ludo to finish him off. Ludo then returns to the void to find himself while River is revealed to be alive and returns to Mewni. Remembering her pact with Eclipsa, Moon checks on her prison, which is still intact. However, after she leaves, it begins to crack.
40a	5a	"Scent of a Hoodie"	Brett Varon	Madeleine Flores, Brett Varon & Nicolette Wood	Dominic Bisignano, Bryan Caselli, Aaron Hammersley, Amy Higgins, John Infantino & Daron Nefcy	November 6, 2017	305	0.30
After helping defeat Toffee, Star has to stay on Mewni for her own protection and Marco says goodbye and returns to Earth, but he is missing his hoodie. Unknown to him, Star has kept his hoodie, but Pony Head arrives and throws it into the Royal Laundry for cleaning. Star tries to get the hoodie back from the Knight of the Wash, who insists it be cleaned to the highest standards. In spite of her efforts, the hoodie is eventually cleaned, but she is ecstatic that it has retained Marco's scent. It is then shipped back to Earth where Marco receives it and is surprised that his hoodie also has Star's scent.
40b	5b	"Rest in Pudding"	Dominic Bisignano & Aaron Hammersley	Dominic Bisignano, Jushtin Lee, Amelia Lorenz & Kenny Pittenger	Dominic Bisignano, Bryan Caselli, Aaron Hammersley, Amy Higgins, John Infantino & Daron Nefcy	November 6, 2017	305	0.30
Star's family and the Magic High Commission hold a memorial for Lekmet. Star notices Glossaryck in almost every waking moment that she starts believing he is haunting her over unfinished business. She contacts Janna for help and proceeds to tell her that anything that remains of Glossaryck must be properly buried in a place of meaning for him. Star then takes the remains of Glossaryck's spell book and throws it into the well at the sanctuary. Star believes it's over, only for Glossaryck to then be reborn. However, he has amnesia, with the only word he can pronounce being "Globgor".
41a	6a	"Club Snubbed"	Tyler Chen	Tyler Chen, Gina Gress & Sarah Oleksyk	Dominic Bisignano, Bryan Caselli, Aaron Hammersley, Amy Higgins, John Infantino & Daron Nefcy	November 7, 2017	306	0.26
During the annual Silver Bell Ball, all neighboring kingdoms' rulers come to attend. Star is snubbed by Tom when his family arrives. After attempting to do the same by dancing with her other male dance partners, she then eventually confronts him alone to ask him why. Tom answers by saying he's giving her space since he was present during Song Day, from which he misinterpreted that she and Marco are in a relationship. She denies this, and eventually reluctantly asks him to dance, which they begin to enjoy, and the Ball is declared a success.
41b	6b	"Stranger Danger"	Brett Varon	Casey Crowe & Charlotte Jackson	Dominic Bisignano, Bryan Caselli, Aaron Hammersley, Amy Higgins, John Infantino & Daron Nefcy	November 7, 2017	306	0.26
Star runs into Eclipsa, who is now free of her crystal prison. However, their friendly talk is interrupted by Moon and the Magic High Commission, who capture Eclipsa. Star asks why Eclipsa was crystallized, and is outraged that it was just because she married a monster. While Moon and the Commission don't trust Eclipsa and want to re-crystallize her, Star convinces them to give her a fair trial. In the meantime, Eclipsa is put under house arrest. Star later visits her and they start a friendship.
42a	7a	"Demoncism"	Dominic Bisignano & Aaron Hammersley	Zach Marcus, Kenny Pittenger & Cassie Zwart	Dominic Bisignano, Bryan Caselli, Aaron Hammersley, Amy Higgins, John Infantino & Daron Nefcy	November 8, 2017	307	0.25
A jittery Pony Head confides to Star that Tom is undergoing a "demoncism", which is meant to turn him into a more normal, tamed being. They secretly infiltrate the ceremony for Star to rescue Tom, but the demoncism goes ahead as scheduled, only for its organizer to reveal that he still has plenty of rage in him. They are then seen holding hands, much to Pony Head's dismay.
42b	7b	"Sophomore Slump"	Tyler Chen	Tyler Chen, Sage Cotugno & Kristen Gish	Dominic Bisignano, Bryan Caselli, Aaron Hammersley, Amy Higgins, John Infantino & Daron Nefcy	November 8, 2017	307	0.25
On Earth, Marco begins to spout so much of his adventures in Mewni that his friends, peers, and teachers begin to distance themselves from him except for Janna. Jackie suspects that he isn't letting go of these so easily, so Marco takes her out on a date to prove he's moved on and a better boyfriend to her. Upon discovering he is secretly hiding the cape King River gave to him on Mewni under his hoodie, she tells him that he's only staying in Echo Creek to make her happy for her sake. She kindly breaks up with him and leaves. Deciding he wants to return to Mewni as an exchange student, his family and friends see him off.
43a	8a	"Lint Catcher"	Brett Varon	Madeleine Flores, Brett Varon & Nicolette Wood	Dominic Bisignano, Bryan Caselli, Aaron Hammersley, Amy Higgins, John Infantino & Daron Nefcy	November 9, 2017	308	0.40
Marco arrives on Mewni, but Star feels indifferent over his presence. She gives him a job below the castle as a squire to Knight of the Wash, Sir Lavabo. After a brief conversation with Eclipsa, Star runs back to the Royal Washroom to find Marco fighting off a giant lint monster. They eventually defeat it by turning on the lint blade catcher. Star apologizes to Marco and as an act of good faith, she magically creates an exact replica of his bedroom in the castle and appoints him as her own squire.
43b	8b	"Trial by Squire"	Dominic Bisignano & Aaron Hammersley	Jushtin Lee, Amelia Lorenz & Kenny Pittenger	Dominic Bisignano, Bryan Caselli, Aaron Hammersley, Amy Higgins, John Infantino & Daron Nefcy	November 9, 2017	308	0.40
Star and Marco prepare for the Midnight Warrior Blowout Sale at Quest Buy. During the event, they meet fellow shoppers who will stop at nothing to get the best knight gear. After meeting female squire Higgs, she ridicules Marco by telling him that in spite of being named squire, it was handed to him under the impression that he's Star's boyfriend, which he denies. With all their efforts, Star reassures him that she only named him squire so they can go on adventures again like they used to. They finish the blowout sale by buying random, fun things instead of suitable knight gear much to the praise of the knights and Higgs' chagrin.
44a	9a	"Princess Turdina"	Tyler Chen	Tyler Chen, Gina Gress & Sarah Oleksyk	Dominic Bisignano, Bryan Caselli, Aaron Hammersley, Amy Higgins, John Infantino & Daron Nefcy	November 13, 2017	309	0.33
Marco is set to receive an honorary degree from St. Olga's for inciting the rebellion. Pony Head approves of this and insists that he does everything to maintain the facade of Princess Turdina, but Star wants him to reveal the truth. Marco decides to listen to Pony Head, in order to maintain the self-esteem of the princesses of St. Olga's but also because they are throwing a party and building a statue of Princess Turdina. Miss Heinous arrives at the Party and reveals that "Princess Turdina" is a boy, and Marco confirms the truth. Miss Heinous says that just as the Princesses need her, she needs them, but the Princesses are unfazed by the truth, stating that his gender doesn't matter, as her message of being true to yourself is true as well, and chase Miss Heinous off once more.
44b	9b	"Starfari"	Brett Varon	Casey Crowe & Charlotte Jackson	Dominic Bisignano, Bryan Caselli, Aaron Hammersley, Amy Higgins, John Infantino & Daron Nefcy	November 13, 2017	309	0.33
Star goes out into the field to understand why Mewmans treat Monsters unfairly. She meets the expert on the subject, the Royal Monster Examiner, who initially seems to understand Star's point of view, but eventually reveals that she simply sees Monsters as animals and wants to put them in a sanctuary, by blowing up a dam and surrounding the monster village with water. Star manages to save village with Buff Frog and the other Monster's help, and then, when the Monster Examiner decides to "live like a monster" in the mud, Star gives her position to Buff Frog.
45a	10a	"Sweet Dreams"	Tyler Chen & Aaron Hammersley	Sage Cotugno & Amelia Lorenz	Dominic Bisignano, Bryan Caselli, Aaron Hammersley, Amy Higgins, John Infantino & Daron Nefcy	November 14, 2017	310	0.41
Star has a dream that she is flying and eating goblin dogs to her heart's content, only to wake up in her bedroom with Marco growing concern. To test her theory she has Marco watch her late at night with him chained to her, where he is dragged and discovers that she transforms into her butterfly form and is traveling through various dimensions into one portal. He wakes her up and with the help of Glossaryck and Eclipsa, they manage to return to Mewni. Eclipsa suggests to Star that her dreams should be embraced openly as to understand what she is truly capable of.
45b	10b	"Lava Lake Beach"	Dominic Bisignano & Aaron Hammersley	Zach Marcus, Kenny Pittenger & Cassie Zwart	Dominic Bisignano, Bryan Caselli, Aaron Hammersley, Amy Higgins, John Infantino & Daron Nefcy	November 14, 2017	310	0.41
Star, Marco, Tom, and Kelly head out to Lava Lake Beach. Kelly however doesn't feel too inclined on joining in too long with their festivities, so she wanders off alone. Marco chases after her, where she confides to him that she has broken up with her boyfriend Tad, but he is still living in her thick layer of hair and won't leave. Marco steps inside and tries to casually tell Tad that Kelly wants to move on, but Tad then easily guesses that Marco himself is miserable because of hidden feelings for his crush on Star. Conflicted, Marco runs off only to see Star kissing Tom from afar. Kelly finds him alone and offers to show him a grand view of the entire beach. He asks her if it's already midnight to which she answers yes, indicating it's Marco's birthday.
46a	11a	"Death Peck"	Brett Varon	Madeleine Flores, Kenny Pittenger, Brett Varon & Nicolette Wood	Dominic Bisignano, Bryan Caselli, Aaron Hammersley, Amy Higgins, John Infantino & Daron Nefcy	November 15, 2017	311	0.38
Star urges the royal youth of Mewni to sign a petition calling for the equal treatment of Monsters. The only young royal who has not signed it, is Rich Pigeon, so Star, Marco and Ponyhead go to convince him. Marco assumes that Rich Pigeon is merely a normal pigeon and tries to make him sign the petition, but accidentally breaks his leg. The other Pigeons retaliate violently, and eventually capture the three, and plan on killing Marco through a slow execution called, "Death by a Thousand Pecks" in which Marco is apparently pecked repeatedly until he dies. However, Rich Pigeon intervenes, having learnt the common Mewmen language, in an attempt to help his kingdom and agrees to sign the petition believing it to be the path to a better future.
46b	11b	"Ponymonium"	Dominic Bisignano & Aaron Hammersley	Dominic Bisignano, Kristen Gish, Jushtin Lee & Kenny Pittenger	Dominic Bisignano, Bryan Caselli, Aaron Hammersley, Amy Higgins, John Infantino & Daron Nefcy	November 15, 2017	311	0.38
Star is thrilled when Pony Head invites her to dinner with her sisters. Ponyhead claims that her sisters are dangerous and scheming, but they appear very nice and kind, making Pony Head seem like the mean one, who eventually leaves in anger after an argument. The sisters begin to become very close to Star, and eventually reveal their intention to frame Pony Head for the (false) murder of one of the sisters, as doing so would result in Pony Head losing the right to succeed to the throne. Pony Head reveals that she knew their plan and used Star to simply prove it, having captured the conversation on video. Star leaves completely bewildered and confused by the relationship of the family, after Pony Head reveals that she still loves her sisters regardless.
47a	12a	"Night Life"	Tyler Chen	Tyler Chen, Gina Gress & Sarah Oleksyk	Dominic Bisignano, Bryan Caselli, Aaron Hammersley, Amy Higgins, John Infantino & Daron Nefcy	November 16, 2017	312	0.34
Marco is going around helping Hekapoo dealing with rogue interdimensional portals as they open up in seemingly random places, but at the cost of ignoring his duties as squire to Star, which includes taking care of Glossaryck, who since being revived seems to have lost his mind, repeating the word, "Globgor" and acting like an animal. Marco lies to Star, not telling her about the truth of his adventures and continues to help Hekapoo close portals. Hekapoo reveals that she has managed to find the source of the problem, which causes Marco to panic, as it is revealed that Star is the cause; while she is asleep, and when she enters her butterfly form, she travels through various dimensions but fails to close any of her portals, which Marco and Hekapoo have been dealing with. Hekapoo discovers that Star cannot control her form and power, but Marco convinces her to not tell the Magic High Commission. He also reveals the truth to Star who thanks him for his help.
47b	12b	"Deep Dive"	Brett Varon	Dominic Bisignano, Casey Crowe, Aaron Hammersley, Charlotte Jackson, Kenny Pittenger & Brett Varon	Dominic Bisignano, Bryan Caselli, Aaron Hammersley, Amy Higgins, John Infantino & Daron Nefcy	November 16, 2017	312	0.34
Star decides to find out what is causing her transformations into her Butterfly form in her sleep and she enlists Janna's help to do so. They attach a camera to her head in her sleep. It is revealed that Star is attracted to a portal, but as she passes through, the camera is knocked off, and Marco begins to panic. Star wakes up in the realm of magic where she meets the First-Born, a unicorn of her own creation when she purified her magic from Toffee's taint. Star begins to lose focus and her memories as she enjoys her time in the Realm of Magic. Marco, in a last ditch attempt, uses Star's wand and activates the All-seeing eye spell. He manages to contact Star and then brings her back to her senses. After returning, Star is able to enter in and out of her butterfly form at will.
48	13	"Monster Bash"	Dominic Bisignano, Tyler Chen & Aaron Hammersley	Dominic Bisignano, Tyler Chen, Sage Cotugno, Amelia Lorenz, Zach Marcus & Cassie Zwart	Dominic Bisignano, Bryan Caselli, Aaron Hammersley, Amy Higgins, John Infantino & Daron Nefcy	November 16, 2017	313	0.29
Star decides to hold a party that unites both Mewmans and Monsters at an old palace, but when guests start disappearing one by one under unknown circumstances, she and Marco investigate. They soon discover in the palace's underground chamber that Mina Loveberry has been camping out capturing unsuspecting monsters to keep order. At the same time, Miss Heinous barges in on them to get her revenge on Marco, only for her to recognize the chamber was once her old nursery as a young child. In a stunning revelation to Star and Marco, Mina explains that Miss Heinous is - in actuality - Eclipsa's daughter Meteora, thus making her a Butterfly. Before Mina can capture Meteora, Star demands to know more, but it leads to a conflict between the two. The party guests flee as the Magic High Commission raid the palace, leaving Star only further curious about these turn of events. Miss Heinous is last seen fleeing into the woods where she readopts her true name as Meteora.
49a	14a	"Stump Day"	Tyler Chen	Tyler Chen, Gina Gress & Sarah Oleksyk	Dominic Bisignano, Bryan Caselli, Aaron Hammersley, Amy Higgins, John Infantino & Daron Nefcy	December 2, 2017	314	0.30
Stump Day is a holiday in Mewni where the people thank the stump, a literal tree stump that was pivotal in the formation of their kingdom. Star's birthday falls on Stump day, but she never celebrates it as she says that they must pray to the stump, but Marco decides to hold her birthday anyway, as no one except Star believes that the Stump is real. However it proves to be real and attack them as they did not thank it that day. However it leaves, as soon as midnight passes since Stump Day ends, sparing their lives. When Star still has her birthday.
49b	14b	"Holiday Spellcial"	Brett Varon	Casey Crowe & Charlotte Jackson	Dominic Bisignano, Bryan Caselli, Aaron Hammersley, Amy Higgins, John Infantino & Daron Nefcy	December 2, 2017	314	0.30
The Spells within Star's wand are ready to celebrate Stump Day, but they are all nervous about Star's new spell, Seeing-Eye, who says nothing and watches everyone. Spider in a Top Hat attempts to make sure it gets along with the others, but Seeing-Eye only ruins the situation by telling the truth to everyone and revealing their dark and shameful secrets. He eventually reveals Spider's secret which is where he vented his frustrations at all the other spells when no one would get along with each other, and just as everyone is leaving, Seeing-Eye understands its mistakes and remedies the situation by showing other truthful scenes where everyone is expressing their love for each other.
50a	15a	"The Bogbeast of Boggabah"	Brett Varon	Madeleine Flores, Aaron Hammersley, Brett Varon & Nicolette Wood	Dominic Bisignano, Bryan Caselli, Aaron Hammersley, Amy Higgins, John Infantino & Daron Nefcy	March 3, 2018	315	0.18
Star tells Moon about Meteora, but her claims are dismissed. River then forces her to go on a hunt for the Bogbeast of Boggabah with him. Star is warned by a 'Bogbeast veteran' to listen for the bogbeasts song. Star and River then go through several rituals that Star rushes causing them to have to start over. That night Star hears the bogbeast's song and rushes after it getting trapped in mud. River then reveals that she is the Bogbeast as she is impulsive and runs headfirst into situations. Having learned to keep impulsiveness in check, Star decides to stay for a bog party and going straight to Moon.
50b	15b	"Total Eclipsa the Moon"	Dominic Bisignano & Aaron Hammersley	Dominic Bisignano, Kristen Gish, Jushtin Lee & Kenny Pittenger	Dominic Bisignano, Bryan Caselli, Aaron Hammersley, Amy Higgins, John Infantino & Daron Nefcy	March 3, 2018	315	0.18
Moon grows curious over Star's claims about Eclipsa's daughter. According to the Butterfly Family book Eclipsa's daughter is named Festivia, but Eclipsa herself claims to have never heard of her. To find out the truth, Moon and Eclipsa team up and secretly infiltrate the Royal Archive, where the entire history of the Butterfly family is held. They eventually find Eclipsa's scroll only to discover anything about her daughter was rewritten. They then flee back to the castle after Moon accidentally triggers the alarm. Eclipsa becomes concerned about her daughter, but Moon assures her they'll find the truth.
51a	16a	"Butterfly Trap"	Sage Cotugno	Sage Cotugno & Amelia Lorenz	Dominic Bisignano, Bryan Caselli, Aaron Hammersley, Amy Higgins, John Infantino & Daron Nefcy	March 10, 2018	316	0.36
Eclipsa's trial begins. Moon uses the Box of Truth (the Truth or Punishment cube from "Sleepover") and allows every Magic High Commission member to ask Eclipsa one question. However, it soon becomes a mock-trial where everything she says is used against her. About to be declared guilty, it's revealed that she is allowed to ask them a question as well. She then asks the Commission about Meteora and they deny to know anything. However, the box reveals they are lying and force them to tell the truth: Eclipsa's ex-husband, King Shastacan, had her replaced with Festivia, who was actually a peasant. Moon, Eclipsa and Star then reveal that they had set the whole thing up. Outraged that they are not true royalty, Star frees Eclipsa and runs off.
51b	16b	"Ludo, Where Art Thou?"	Dominic Bisignano & Aaron Hammersley	Dominic Bisignano, Aaron Hammersley, Zach Marcus & Cassie Zwart	Dominic Bisignano, Bryan Caselli, Aaron Hammersley, Amy Higgins, John Infantino & Daron Nefcy	March 10, 2018	316	0.36
Ludo's brother Dennis stumbles upon dimensional scissors at their family home, so he decides to use it to find his brother. Ludo's minions Spider and Eagle volunteer by venturing into each portal, but to no success in finding him. Spider senses something in one portal, so Dennis ventures into it and finds Ludo having a mental breakdown in a makeshift home with their parents made up of various objects to keep himself company. Dennis unsuccessfully tries various ways to convince Ludo to come home, but Ludo ultimately comes to realize that he's just not ready to return home yet. Dennis wishes him the best and returns to his own dimension, leaving Ludo pondering over Star and Marco.
52a	17a	"Is Another Mystery"	Brett Varon	Madeleine Flores, Brett Varon & Nicolette Wood	Dominic Bisignano, Bryan Caselli, Aaron Hammersley, Amy Higgins, John Infantino & Daron Nefcy	March 17, 2018	317	0.30
Marco comes across a message from Buff Frog that he's leaving Mewni along with his children and other fellow monsters, so Star and Tom venture to his swamp where he tells them that there's no room for them on Mewni anymore due to the discrimination of their kind escalating. Although they try to persuade them otherwise - including Tom expressing his half-monster heritage - Buff Frog ultimately decides to depart, but reassures Tom and Star that he will stay vigilant if he is ever needed by them.
52b	17b	"Marco Jr."	Brett Varon	Casey Crowe & Charlotte Jackson	Dominic Bisignano, Bryan Caselli, Aaron Hammersley, Amy Higgins, John Infantino & Daron Nefcy	March 17, 2018	317	0.30
Marco and Star return to Earth to find out that he will soon have a baby brother named after him. He soon has a Mewni painter paint a portrait of him as a present to his new sibling, but the painter gets his image wrong, and the distorted magic painting disfigures him.
53a	18a	"Skooled!"	Dominic Bisignano & Aaron Hammersley	Dominic Bisignano, Kristen Gish, Aaron Hammersley, Jushtin Lee & Kenny Pittenger	Dominic Bisignano, Bryan Caselli, Aaron Hammersley, Amy Higgins, John Infantino & Daron Nefcy	March 24, 2018	318	0.23
Pony Head returns to St. Olga's Reform School, just as Meteora breaks in with Gemini and Rasticore to find the school's founder, the robot St. Olga. She then hacks into her and discovers her origins: King Shastacan gave her to her as a baby, who then raised her into becoming Heinous. Believing they intend to retake the school, the princesses fight them but are defeated, with Meteora taking Pony Head's horn. Terrified of her, Rasticore tries to flee, but Meteora destroys Gemini, revealing that he is a robot, and the resulting explosion reduces him back to an arm. Meteora then takes Rasticore and announces her intentions to retake the throne of Mewni for herself.
53b	18b	"Booth Buddies"	Tyler Chen	Dominic Bisignano, Tyler Chen, Gina Gress, Aaron Hammersley & Sarah Oleksyk	Dominic Bisignano, Bryan Caselli, Aaron Hammersley, Amy Higgins, John Infantino & Daron Nefcy	March 24, 2018	318	0.23
During Foolduke's and Ruberiot's wedding, Star finds photo-booth and drags Marco inside to take a photo. However, Star is unsatisfied with it and forces Marco to redo them until they're perfect. The photo-booth eventually breaks down, locking them inside. The photo-booth repair goblin, Ben Fotino, claims that the booth is magic and that they must take a sincere photo for it to release them. Star and Marco discuss how their relationship has been since she confessed that she had a crush on him before finally taking a sincere photo that ultimately leads to them kissing, leaving them both flabbergasted and dumbstruck. Ben then reveals that he actually locked them inside in hopes this would happen, having deduced they had feelings for each other. Afterwards, Star and Marco agree to keep this between them.
54a	19a	"Bam Ui Pati!"	Brett Varon	Dominic Bisignano, Madeleine Flores, Aaron Hammersley, Brett Varon & Nicolette Wood	Dominic Bisignano, Bryan Caselli, Aaron Hammersley, Amy Higgins, John Infantino & Daron Nefcy	March 31, 2018	319	0.32
Pony Head has fallen into a depression due to the loss of her horn, refusing to leave her room or talk to anyone while becoming addicted to Korean dramas. Star and her sisters try to cheer her up, but she runs away with them giving chase. Pony Head eventually snaps out of her depression after her favority drama manages to get a happy ending. She then agrees to get a horn transplant and returns to her former self, much to everyone's annoyance.
54b	19b	"Tough Love"	Dominic Bisignano & Aaron Hammersley	Dominic Bisignano, Kristen Gish, Aaron Hammersley, Jushtin Lee & Kenny Pittenger	Dominic Bisignano, Bryan Caselli, Aaron Hammersley, Amy Higgins, John Infantino & Daron Nefcy	March 31, 2018	319	0.32
Moon and Eclipsa travel to the Pigeon Kingdom upon learning that Meteora has been leaving a trail of destruction there. With help from a local named Eddie, they eventually locate her and discover that she is now a huge monster as result of feeding on souls. Eclipsa convinces Moon to allow her to talk to her daughter and the two share a happy reunion until Meteora demands the throne of Mewni, which Eclipsa denies. Moon and Meteora then fight and just as Meteora is about to win Eclipsa declares her love for her, which Moon uses as an opportunity to counterattack. However, Eclipsa stops Moon and Meteora drains half her soul. Moon and Meteora then both flee, leaving a distraught Eclipsa by herself.
55	20	"Divide" (Part 1)	Dominic Bisignano, Aaron Hammersley & Brett Varon	Dominic Bisignano, Gina Gress, Aaron Hammersley, Zach Marcus, Sarah Oleksyk, Brett Varon & Cassie Zwart	Dominic Bisignano, Bryan Caselli, Aaron Hammersley, Amy Higgins, John Infantino & Daron Nefcy	April 7, 2018	320	0.35
With Moon missing, Star is made acting queen, but she struggles with the responsibility. As Meteora heads towards the castle, Star sends Marco to hold her off while she looks for her mother. Marco forms a team composed of himself, Tom, Pony Head, Hekapoo, Talon and Kelly and attempt to trap her, but their plan fails and they are forced to flee with Meteora giving chase. Star meanwhile, with help from Eclipsa, deduces Moon to be in the Realm of Magic and heads there. She eventually finds her mother, who has regained the other half of her soul, but suffers from amnesia due to the realm's influence. Star continuously tries to bring her home, but eventually succumbs to the realm's effects herself.
56	21	"Conquer" (Part 2)	Dominic Bisignano, Tyler Chen, Aaron Hammersley & Brett Varon	Tyler Chen, Sage Cotugno, Casey Crowe, Aaron Hammersley, Charlotte Jackson & Amelia Lorenz	Dominic Bisignano, Aaron Hammersley, Amy Higgins, John Infantino & Daron Nefcy	April 7, 2018	321	0.37
Marco and his team once again fail to trap Meteora and everyone, with the exception of Tom, has their soul drained. Meanwhile, the amnesiac Star and Moon fool around in the Realm of Magic, until the First-Born sends them away. Star then wakes up at home, with Moon still missing. As River holds off Meteora, Star and Tom try to reach the sanctuary to revive Marco, but are unable to access it. Tom suggests they flee to his realm, but seeing Meteora defeating River convinces Star that she must face her. They fight and just as Star is about to be defeated Eclipsa takes her wand and regresses Meteora into a baby. As everyone's souls return, Star allows Eclipsa to keep the wand. She then flies off with Meteora and Glossaryck, whose amnesia was just an act. They arrive at the monster temple, where they find Eclipsa's monster husband, Globgor, inside a crystal prison.

=== Season 4 (2019) ===
No. overall	No. in season	Title	Directed by	Written & storyboarded by	Story by	Original release date	Prod. code	U.S. viewers (millions)
57	1	"Butterfly Follies" (Part 1)	Dominic Bisignano & Sage Cotugno	Dominic Bisignano, Tyler Chen, Kristen Gish, Gina Gress, Aaron Hammersley, Amelia Lorenz & Cassie Zwart	Dominic Bisignano, Todd Casey, Aaron Hammersley, Amy Higgins, John Infantino & Daron Nefcy	March 10, 2019	401	0.34
Eclipsa is now the queen of Mewni, after Star willingly ceded the throne. Under her rule, the living conditions of the monster population have greatly improved and she has invested a huge amount of resources into unsuccessfully freeing Globgor from his imprisonment. However, the Mewmen parts of the kingdom have fallen into disrepair and the people blame the royal family for their situation. Star, River and Marco, meanwhile, have been searching for Moon, but to no avail. They receive a tip that she is at a local "Pie Festival", only for it to turn out to be yet another false lead. However, afterwards they discover that the pies from the festival were made using Moon's recipe, finally giving them a genuine clue. Note: This episode was dedicated to the memory of Hazel Hammersley (daughter of Aaron Hammersley) who died of cancer in April 2018.
58	2	"Escape from the Pie Folk" (Part 2)	Sage Cotugno & Brett Varon	Dominic Bisignano, Tyler Chen, Madeleine Flores, Zach Marcus, Kenny Pittenger & Nicolette Wood	Dominic Bisignano, Todd Casey, Aaron Hammersley, Amy Higgins, John Infantino & Daron Nefcy	March 10, 2019	402	0.37
Star, Marco, and River arrive at the home of the Pie Folk, only to immediately be captured. They are rescued by Foolduke and Ruberiot, who reveal the pie recipe they thought was Moon's has been with the Pie Folk for generations. Just as they were about to give up, they suddenly find Moon, still suffering from amnesia, making these very pies for the Pie Folk. They are then confronted by the Pie King, who reveals Moon and Star's ancestor, Queen Festivia, to have been Pie Folk, making them part-Pie Folk themselves. Due to her amnesia, Moon initially opts to stay with the Pies, until she regains some of her memories after she and Star sing together. They then all escape by hot air balloon with Foolduke and Ruberiot, and Moon promises Star and River that everything will be okay.
59a	3a	"Moon Remembers"	Brett Varon	Casey Crowe & Charlotte Jackson	Dominic Bisignano, Todd Casey, Aaron Hammersley, Amy Higgins, John Infantino & Daron Nefcy	March 17, 2019	403	0.39
Star, Marco and River return to the monster temple with Moon, whose memory still has not fully returned. Star convinces Marco and Eclipsa to keep her mother in the dark about Globgor, but she eventually discovers him anyway. Contrary to what they were expecting though, Moon claims to understand Eclipsa wanting him back and the two get along fine. Despite this, however, Moon still can not get herself to trust Eclipsa and decides to leave with River, choosing not to oppose her rule out of respect for Star's decision to cede the throne to her.
59b	3b	"Swim Suit"	Dominic Bisignano	Amelia Lorenz & Kristen Gish	Dominic Bisignano, Todd Casey, Aaron Hammersley, Amy Higgins, John Infantino & Daron Nefcy	March 17, 2019	403	0.39
While preparing to go to the beach with Marco and Tom, Star is called by Eclipsa, who reveals that she got into a fight with Magic High Commission member Rhombulus, who created Globgor's crystal prison, to get him to undo the spell. Star attempts to get the two to peacefully reconcile, only for them to end up fighting again. Eclipsa uses a spell that causes her and Rhombulus to switch bodies in order to undo Globgor's prison. However, Star convinces her to stop by pointing out that she will just prove herself to be the villain everyone claims her to be. Afterwards, Rhombulus angrily leaves, while Marco and Tom, seeing it is too late to go to the beach, make a kiddie pool to cheer Star up.
60a	4a	"Ransomgram"	Sage Cotugno	Gina Gress & Cassie Zwart	Dominic Bisignano, Todd Casey, Aaron Hammersley, Amy Higgins, John Infantino & Daron Nefcy	March 17, 2019	404	0.33
Star & Marco go to the Neverzone to rescue Nachoes when Marco is given a "ransomgram" by the Neverzonian Wraiths.
60b	4b	"Lake House Fever"	Brett Varon	Zach Marcus & Kenny Pittenger	Dominic Bisignano, Todd Casey, Aaron Hammersley, Amy Higgins, John Infantino & Daron Nefcy	March 17, 2019	404	0.33
Star visits Tom at his lake house, they surf on the lava tides when suddenly a fire rain starts to fall preventing her from going back to Marco's family dinner. Star helps Tom's mom to make a demonade but she overfills the mixer and the demon fruit gets out of the mixer making little fire demons appear, while it happens star notices that Tom's mom behaves weirdly near her. Tom explains that she is scared that Star will hurt Tom again and that she knows that Star kissed Marco. Star gets mad that Tom didn't tell her about that and goes out of the hut. Tom runs to her and tells her that it's okay and he knows it was because of the goblin. Then a tide washes him into the lake. Star risks her life and she saves Tom. At the end Tom's mom takes the last photo of Star and Tom for the photo album and explains that the rain appeared because of her emotions.
61a	5a	"Yada Yada Berries"	Brett Varon	Casey Crowe & Charlotte Jackson	Dominic Bisignano, Todd Casey, Aaron Hammersley, Amy Higgins, John Infantino & Daron Nefcy	March 24, 2019	405	0.35
After someone put Yada Yada Berries, which turn whoever eats them into stone, in Eclipsa's food, Star and Marco attempt to find the culprit. Their investigation eventually brings them to a merchant named Apothecary Sherry, who reveals a monster named Ruben bought some. However, they find he is not the culprit and go back to Sherry, but she turns herself to stone by drinking Yada Yada Berry Juice to avoid interrogation. Star then imprisons everyone who bought Yada Yada Berries from Sherry, all of whom happen to be Mewmans who distrust Eclipsa, but Eclipsa lets them all go, determined to earn their trust.
61b	5b	"Down by the River"	Sage Cotugno	Madeleine Flores & Nicolette Wood	Dominic Bisignano, Todd Casey, Aaron Hammersley, Amy Higgins, John Infantino & Daron Nefcy	March 24, 2019	405	0.35
A Mewman family - the Maizleys - are forced out of their home, which was conquered from monsters, when Eclipsa returns it to the original owners. Meanwhile, Moon and River are trying to live a quiet life in the woods, until the Maizleys move in next to them. Moon is unable to put up with them and intends to force them out, only for them to leave on their own, as they are incapable of surviving in the wild. They then reveal that Moon had always done everything for them, causing her to change her mind and welcome the Maizleys. Later, another Mewman family arrives and Moon welcomes them as well.
62a	6a	"The Ponyhead Show!"	Dominic Bisignano	Kristen Gish & Amelia Lorenz	Dominic Bisignano, Todd Casey, Aaron Hammersley, Amy Higgins, John Infantino & Daron Nefcy	March 24, 2019	406	0.36
Pony Head puts on her own daytime talk show to help increase Eclipsa's popularity among the Mewmans, which is broadcast to the compact mirror phones. However, it goes on a huge disaster when Seahorse reveals he hacked the phones of everyone in Mewni so that they can't even turn their phones off if they want to. The show receiving hundreds of downvotes and an angry mob of Mewmans gathering outside Pony Head's house. Despite all this, Eclipsa still performs in the show, singing a soft ballad and expressing how much she wants to be a queen that the people can count on. This doesn't change the minds of the Mewmans, they riot and hurl insults. So a crying despairing Star is forced to shut down the broadcast of the show, but Eclipsa remains true to herself. Meanwhile, After the violent mob leaves, a little girl really liked Eclipsa's song, and she gives Pony Head's show one upvote.
62b	6b	"Surviving the Spiderbites"	Sage Cotugno	Gina Gress & Cassie Zwart	Dominic Bisignano, Todd Casey, Aaron Hammersley, Amy Higgins, John Infantino & Daron Nefcy	March 24, 2019	406	0.36
When Mewni receives a diplomatic visit from King and Queen Spiderbite from the Spiderbite Kingdom, Eclipsa is absent, forcing Star to take over. However, after being unimpressed by monster culture, Star accuses them of prejudice, until their daughter - Princess Penelope - is revealed to be in a relationship with one. They then reveal that their problem is not with monsters but Globgor, who they reveal ate their ancestor - Eclipsa's ex-husband King Shastacan. Star then finds Eclipsa, who puts the Spiderbites at ease by showing them Globgor's crystalized state. Afterwards, Eclipsa reveals she has been searching for pieces of the Book of Spells to restore it and use the knowledge inside to help the kingdom. Fearing she will instead use it to free Globgor, Star hides that she still has one piece in her possession.
63a	7a	"Out of Business"	Brett Varon	Zach Marcus & Kenny Pittenger	Dominic Bisignano, Matt Brailey, Todd Casey, Aaron Hammersley, Amy Higgins, John Infantino & Daron Nefcy	March 31, 2019	407	0.34
Star, Marco, and Janna attend the Closing Day sale at Quest Buy, but are easily overwhelmed with a crowd buying every last item available on their shelves. Janna poses as a Quest Buy employee and takes them through a restricted section where every shelf looks seemingly empty. Eventually the trio find what they need, but one of the Quest Buy sloths catches them and tells them he's simply waiting until their brains "turn to mush," meaning the items they have in hand are actually manifestations from their minds of what they really want can become real and other shoppers have obsessed over it many times that they've been locked up in cages not willing to leave. They immediately leave with their manifested items and depart Quest Buy with bewildered expressions.
63b	7b	"Kelly's World"	Sage Cotugno	Madeleine Flores & Nicolette Wood	Dominic Bisignano, Todd Casey, Aaron Hammersley, Amy Higgins, John Infantino & Daron Nefcy	March 31, 2019	407	0.34
Marco visits Kelly at her house, but is feeling down. Posing as a local Woolett, Marco decides to spend time around town with Kelly by heading to the local library to return one of her borrowed books. Along the way, Marco faces one misunderstanding after another with her town's customs and mannerisms. They arrive at the library, but are too late on returning it in time resulting in Kelly being forced to have her hair cut off as punishment. Marco challenges the librarian to a fight to defend her, so the fight ensues. Marco and Kelly defeat her and her assistants easily with their combined teamwork and depart together as "breakup buddies" holding hands.
64	8	"Curse of the Blood Moon"	Dominic Bisignano & Brett Varon	Dominic Bisignano, Tyler Chen, Casey Crowe, Kristen Gish, Aaron Hammersley, Charlotte Jackson & Amelia Lorenz	Dominic Bisignano, Todd Casey, Aaron Hammersley, Amy Higgins, John Infantino & Daron Nefcy	March 31, 2019	408	0.31
Marco realizes he can no longer deny his feelings for Star and decides to confess. Star is revealed to also still have a crush on Marco, but Tom believes they are just under the effects of the "Curse of the Blood Moon", which eternally bonds their souls together. They then travel to the Underworld where they learn from Tom's great-grandfather, Relicor Lucitor, that the only way to break to curse is by using an artifact called the "Severing Stone", which is located deep in the Underworld. They eventually reach it, but it's revealed that, in order to break the curse, they will need to give up the memory of when they first developed feelings for each other. Despite some hesitation, Star and Marco go through with it anyway and they seemingly go back to just seeing each other as friends.
65a	9a	"Princess Quasar Caterpillar and the Magic Bell"	Brett Varon	Zach Marcus & Kenny Pittenger	Dominic Bisignano, Todd Casey, Aaron Hammersley, Amy Higgins, John Infantino & Daron Nefcy	April 7, 2019	409	0.36
After being sent back to the void by his new nemesis, Princess Quasar Caterpillar, Ludo realizes he has fallen into his old ways again. Dennis, Bird, and Spider try to help him, but this involves reuniting him with his former henchmen and rebuilding his old castle. When Ludo hears Star's Wand is now in Eclipsa's possession, he finally snaps as he begins scheming on stealing it and openly tells Dennis he hates the castle. As a distraught Dennis turns to leave, he is confronted by the castle's landowner, who reveals he tricked him into rebuilding it for him. Realizing how much his brother has done for him, Ludo steals the deed to the castle and continues the reconstruction with Dennis and their other siblings, allowing him to finally abandon his villainous ways.
65b	9b	"Ghost of Butterfly Castle"	Sage Cotugno	Gina Gress & Cassie Zwart	Dominic Bisignano, Todd Casey, Aaron Hammersley, Amy Higgins, John Infantino & Daron Nefcy	April 7, 2019	409	0.36
Moon and River's home in the woods has grown into a small community, but the inhabitants constantly turn to Moon to solve their issues. Unable to keep up with everything, Moon goes to get her old ledger at Butterfly Castle, which is said to be haunted. Upon retrieving her ledger, Moon finds that what has been haunting the castle all along was actually Mina Loveberry. Mina reveals she has been trying to dethrone Eclipsa and was the one who put Yada Yada Berries in her food (in "Yada Yada Berries"). Moon tries to convince her that she does not have to fight monsters anymore, but in Mina's eyes she will always be a soldier and Moon will always be a queen. To prove her wrong, Moon decides not to be everyone's problem solver anymore and lets Mina do as she pleases.
66a	10a	"Cornball!"	Sage Cotugno	Madeleine Flores & Nicolette Wood	Dominic Bisignano, Todd Casey, Aaron Hammersley, Amy Higgins, John Infantino & Daron Nefcy	April 7, 2019	410	0.38
Star invites Buff Frog and his kids to attend a game of Cornball, hoping its players of both Mewmans and monsters can put aside their prejudice and properly integrate into the sport together. Buff Frog is not thrilled by this and finds out that Star only invited him as a way to have him return to Mewni. Star tries her best to have both sides play together as mixed teams, but it only escalates into a fight with spectators joining in as well. Unsatisfied, Buff Frog decides to leave along with his kids but then notices from behind the bleachers that his own kids as well as Mewman and monster children are having fun playing their own game of Cornball. Game announcers Marco and Kelly take notice of this, which alerts the attention of all the adults and begin to feel at ease seeing their children play together. Star and Buff Frog realize there may still be hope into proper integration.
66b	10b	"Meteora's Lesson"	Brett Varon	Casey Crowe & Charlotte Jackson	Dominic Bisignano, Todd Casey, Aaron Hammersley, Amy Higgins, John Infantino & Daron Nefcy	April 7, 2019	410	0.38
Eclipsa asks Janna to babysit Meteora while she is away. However, behind Janna's back, Glossaryck takes Meteora back through time with help from former Magic High Commission member Reynaldo the Bald Pate. Unfortunately, they go back too far and end up meeting the first Mewmen settlers of Mewni, who Glossaryck gifts the Royal Magic Wand to help them defend themselves and survive. They then arrive at their actual destination, where they meet a younger Toffee building up his monster army. Toffee threatens Glossaryck, causing Meteora to "dip down" and suck his soul until Glossaryck stops her. Having completed her lesson, Meteora and Glossaryck travel back to the present, with neither Janna nor Eclipsa having noticed they were ever gone.
67a	11a	"The Knight Shift"	Dominic Bisignano	Kristen Gish & Amelia Lorenz	Dominic Bisignano, Todd Casey, Aaron Hammersley, Amy Higgins, John Infantino & Daron Nefcy	April 14, 2019	411	0.33
Marco is knighted by Eclipsa, but questions his future over the matter and quits shortly afterwards. The other knights don't take this well, so Marco is subject to embarrassment and the knights gang up on him. He easily defeats them, but assures them that he already is a knight in his own right.
67b	11b	"Queen-Napped"	Sage Cotugno	Gina Gress & Cassie Zwart	Dominic Bisignano, Todd Casey, Aaron Hammersley, Amy Higgins, John Infantino & Daron Nefcy	April 14, 2019	411	0.33
Star and Marco must rescue the kidnapped Eclipsa.
68a	12a	"Junkin' Janna"	Brett Varon	Zach Marcus & Kenny Pittenger	Dominic Bisignano, Todd Casey, Aaron Hammersley, Amy Higgins, John Infantino & Daron Nefcy	April 14, 2019	412	0.36
Janna is intent on showing Tom how to have fun. She takes him out into a junkyard to retrieve an oversized knight's armored boot, but a crow snatches it. Although Tom refuses to harm the bird, the latter shows great strength by dropping it into the monster castle. Although Tom and Janna retrieve the boot back, the crow refuses to let them leave and shape-shifts into an oversized crow monster. Tom fights back, but is no match in defeating it so the two leave immediately without the boot. At the same time, Eclipsa and Star meet with the Magical High Commission and are informed by them that unknown magic is being used somewhere within monster castle, but have no clue who the culprit is. The shape-shifting crow is then revealed as Sebastian, the crow that belongs to Mina, who uses the armored boot to rebuild a full set of armor.
68b	12b	"A Spell with No Name"	Sage Cotugno	Madeleine Flores & Nicolette Wood	Dominic Bisignano, Todd Casey, Casey Crowe, Aaron Hammersley, Amy Higgins, John Infantino & Daron Nefcy	April 14, 2019	412	0.36
Star and Eclipsa's spells come face to face, and they must work together to stop another incredibly dangerous spell.
69a	13a	"A Boy and His DC-700XE"	Brett Varon	Casey Crowe & Charlotte Jackson	Dominic Bisignano, Todd Casey, Aaron Hammersley, Amy Higgins, John Infantino & Daron Nefcy	April 21, 2019	413	0.34
Tom gets a dragon cycle to join Marco in his ride to the Devil's Pass.
69b	13b	"The Monster and the Queen"	Dominic Bisignano	Kristen Gish & Amelia Lorenz	Dominic Bisignano, Todd Casey, Aaron Hammersley, Amy Higgins, John Infantino & Daron Nefcy	April 21, 2019	413	0.34
Star discovers the Book of Spells piece she was hiding has disappeared. Meanwhile, Eclipsa uses a spell to communicate with Globgor by entering his mind and the two go on a date. Eclipsa reveals that she has successfully restored the Book of Spells and found a way to free Globgor from his crystal prison, but they ultimately decide not to do it as the Mewmans are not ready to accept him yet. Afterwards, Eclipsa is confronted by Star, who is frustrated at her committing yet another villainous act by violating her trust. However, Eclipsa displays indifference to how her people view her and argues that they have not even given her a proper coronation, causing Star to decide to give her one.
70	14	"Cornonation"	Sage Cotugno	Madeleine Flores, Gina Gress, Ariel Vracin-Harrell & Cassie Zwart	Dominic Bisignano, Todd Casey, Aaron Hammersley, Amy Higgins, John Infantino & Daron Nefcy	April 21, 2019	414	0.35
Following the events of the previous episode, Star prepares a "cornonation" for Eclipsa, with both Monsters and Mewmans attending. As the ceremony is about to begin, Star discovers Globgor has escaped. Eclipsa warns everyone, but the Magic High Commission believe she was the one who freed him and arrest her. Star eventually finds Globgor running away from Mewni, believing his presence will only endanger his family. She convinces him to come back, but the High Commission attack him despite his claim of innocence. In the end, everyone realizes Globgor is just a concerned father after he saves Meteora, who got caught in the crossfire. Star then deduces that Rhombulus was the one who freed Globgor in a misguided attempt to prove he is evil. Rhombulus is arrested while Moon, who is amongst the attendees, tells the Mewmans that they need to stop following her and think for themselves. Everyone then finally accepts Eclipsa and Globgor as their new rulers.
71a	15a	"Doop-Doop"	Brett Varon	Kenny Pittenger & Matthew Yang	Dominic Bisignano, Todd Casey, Aaron Hammersley, Amy Higgins, John Infantino & Daron Nefcy	April 28, 2019	415	0.31
With Eclipsa and Globgor now ruling Mewni peacefully, Star announces her plans to travel abroad with Tom while Marco and Janna decide to return to Earth. Before leaving, Star goes around Mewni to say goodbye to everyone. While happy at first, Tom begins to suspect that Star is stalling, especially when she starts saying goodbye to people he has never met like Doop-Doop, her very first spell which she left abandoned in a shed. Star breaks down and reveals that she does not know what to do with herself and does not know if she wants to travel. Tom decides to give Star some space until she figures out her life. Star returns to the Diaz family where she meets Marco's newborn younger sister Mariposa.
71b	15b	"Britta's Tacos"	Brett Varon	Casey Crowe & Charlotte Jackson	Dominic Bisignano, Todd Casey, Aaron Hammersley, Amy Higgins, John Infantino & Daron Nefcy	April 28, 2019	415	0.31
Marco, Star and Mariposa go to Britta's Tacos so that Marco can punch out his card and earn a mystery prize. While there, the group catch up with many of their friends. Sensei and Oskar are shown to have become employees at the restaurant, which Janna has been banned from, while Principal Skeeves and Mr. Crandle show no ill will towards Marco, who earned his high school diploma early. StarFan13 is still obsessed with Star and still romantically ships her with Marco, while Ferguson and Alfonzo have befriended a group of relatively attractive friends who are into D&D. Marco begins to dread Jackie Lynn's return as he felt that the relationship ended badly. She finally shows up and reveals her new girlfriend, Chloe. Jackie admits that she is still on good terms with him and that their time together was great before suggesting that Star is someone worth keeping, leaving Marco feeling good about himself.
72a	16a	"Beach Day"	Amelia Lorenz	Kristen Gish & Amelia Lorenz	Dominic Bisignano, Todd Casey, Gina Gress, Aaron Hammersley, Amy Higgins, John Infantino & Daron Nefcy	April 28, 2019	416	0.32
While watching TV, Star realizes that everything is lining up for the destined Beach Day. She and Marco head to the beach where they encounter various obstacles along the way. When they finally arrive, Star realizes that she left the camera and the Beach Day photo in the taxi and panics, but Marco suggests that they have fun anyway. While doing so, an old woman appears with a camera having taken their photo and assuming they were a couple. Star and Marco rejoice, but the former suddenly feels unfulfilled as she still does not feel happy. She visits Father Time who reveals that she herself left the photo with Father Time to give to her past self. Even though Star's happiest moment may have been fake, it gave her something to look forward to. Realizing how important Beach Day was supposed to be to her, she snaps a picture of the photo on her phone and leaves it with Father Time, so that he could give it to Star earlier.
72b	16b	"Gone Baby Gone"	Sage Cotugno	Gina Gress & Cassie Zwart	Dominic Bisignano, Todd Casey, Aaron Hammersley, Amy Higgins, John Infantino & Daron Nefcy	April 28, 2019	416	0.32
As Marco puts Meteora and Mariposa to bed, Hekapoo arrives and warns Marco against returning to Mewni due to some unspecified danger. However, she leaves the portal open and both babies crawl through. Marco and Star arrive in Hekapoo's dimension where they find that the two are now teenagers. Meteora and Mariposa capture the two and take them to see Wyscan the Granter so that he can give Mariposa magic powers of her own. She backs down at the last minute and she and Marco decide to fight Wyscan when he proves immune to Star and Meteora's magical powers. Afterwards, Marco finally proves to Mariposa that they are siblings and that he loves her. When Mariposa and Meteora decide that they want to stay in the dimension, Marco and Star convince them to come back for the food and he quietly puts them back to bed.
73a	17a	"Sad Teen Hotline"	Sage Cotugno	Madeleine Flores & Ariel Vracin-Harrell	Dominic Bisignano, Todd Casey, Aaron Hammersley, Amy Higgins, John Infantino & Daron Nefcy	May 5, 2019	417	0.33
After returning from his trip, Tom tells Star that they should see other people. The sad moment is ruined when Tom attempts to return home and his portal will not work. Star attempts to open one for him, but she cannot do it either. Feeling that it is because they are sad, they try to calm themselves which is made stressful with the arrival of Marco's parents and some local police officers who will not stop giving input. Eventually, the two work out their stress, but Tom still cannot leave. Marco arrives and uses his dimensional scissors, but it does not work, forcing Tom to spend the night. Star rushes in and reveals that her communication device cannot pick up Moon or Ponyhead's devices, and she declares that they need to return to Mewni.
73b	17b	"Jannanigans"	Brett Varon	Kenny Pittenger & Matthew Yang	Dominic Bisignano, Todd Casey, Aaron Hammersley, Amy Higgins, John Infantino & Daron Nefcy	May 5, 2019	417	0.33
Star, Marco and Tom go see Janna as she was the only one to arrive on Mewni without a portal. The ever aloof Janna claims that she honestly does not remember how she ended up there, but that it was a "normal Thursday". She tries to recreate the events of the day during which Tom suggests to Marco that he is okay with him going out with Star again despite the Blood Curse being lifted. Janna, for the first time ever, displays actual stress of the constant pressure the group is putting on her. Feeling bad, they head to Britta's Tacos where Janna suddenly remembers what she did. She broke into the restaurant's back door and found a cave where a large mural of Mewni origin lies. They find a well that Star remembers she came out of with Moon and realize that this is their way into Mewni.
74a	18a	"Mama Star"	Tyler Chen & Brett Varon	Casey Crowe & Charlotte Jackson	Dominic Bisignano, Todd Casey, Aaron Hammersley, Amy Higgins, John Infantino & Daron Nefcy	May 5, 2019	418	0.36
The gang begin dropping things into the well to get the attention of Star's "unicorn daughter" while Marco examines the mural to learn that the first Mewmans were, in fact, regular humans. The unicorn rises out to tell them to stop, but Oskar offers his car to the group to venture down into the magic dimension. They force the unicorn to pull the car while they have the safety locks on so as not to get out when they lose their memories. Eventually, Tom blows the top of the car and Star and Marco find a new baby unicorn so as to "adopt" it into their "family" while Janna discovers dark baby unicorns. A full grown dark unicorn arrives and attacks them, forcing the original unicorn to use its last ounce of magic to send Star, Marco and Janna away.
74b	18b	"Ready, Aim, Fire!"	Sage Cotugno	Gina Gress & Cassie Zwart	Dominic Bisignano, Todd Casey, Aaron Hammersley, Amy Higgins, John Infantino & Daron Nefcy	May 5, 2019	418	0.36
Marco awakens in the now ruined Butterfly castle to discover that the High Commission is working with Mina Loveberry, who has perfected her metal Solarian soldier to attack Monster Castle. Star awakens in Doop-Doop's shed and flies to the new Mewman kingdom to see Moon. She tells her that she plans to help Eclipsa and Globgor, despite Moon's pessimism. Janna awakens in Meteora's bedroom where Glossaryck tells her that Star is okay. Janna sees Globgor battle Mina in her Solarian battle armor and he is hit with a special blade that limits his powers. As Janna tends to him as well as the rest of the citizens under attack, Eclipsa proceeds to battle Mina. Mina begins beating down on Eclipsa as her bubble shield begins to crack under Mina's blade.
75a	19a	"The Right Way"	Tyler Chen & Brett Varon	Kenny Pittenger & Matthew Yang	Dominic Bisignano, Todd Casey, Aaron Hammersley, Amy Higgins, John Infantino & Daron Nefcy	May 12, 2019	419	0.34
Star arrives to save Eclipsa along with Ponyhead, Sea Horse, Kelly, Rich Pigeon, Jorby, Talon and Quirky Guy. They chase down the Solarian armor, but everyone, minus Star, is hit with the blade and put out of commission. Star summons enough energy to create a giant rainbow armor to combat the Solarian armor while Janna and Eclipsa collect explosives to use. Their plan fails so Eclipsa uses her spell with no name to destroy the armor and succeeds. Marco arrives to inform the group that they were not fighting Mina, but one of her soldiers. They look out to see a large army of Solarian battle armor.
75b	19b	"Here to Help"	Dominic Bisigano	Dominic Bisignano, Kristen Gish & Amelia Lorenz	Dominic Bisigano, Todd Casey, Aaron Hammersley, Amy Higgins, John Infantino & Daron Nefcy	May 12, 2019	419	0.34
Everyone takes refuge in the castle while Mina times them with a rooster. Eclipsa is stressed and does not know what to do, so Moon, who arrived with River, informs her to get everyone to safety. Afterwards, she privately tells Eclipsa that she should surrender. Meanwhile, Star and Marco tend to the pig goats to talk and the two finally admit their feelings, followed by a kiss. When they return, they see Moon and Eclipsa locked in combat. Moon reveals that Mina is acting on her orders just as the rooster crows.
76a	20a	"Pizza Party"	Sage Cotugno	Madeleine Flores & Ariel Vracin-Harell	Dominic Bisigano, Todd Casey, Aaron Hammersley, Amy Higgins, John Infantino & Daron Nefcy	May 12, 2019	420	0.35
As Mina resolves to fulfill her oath to Queen Solaria to wipe out all monsters, Moon reveals she sided with her to prevent her from making matters worse and that she blames Eclipsa for everything that happened to her since the events of "Tough Love". Nonetheless, Eclipsa hands the kingdom back to Moon after she promises stop the army and to let her and her family go. However, Mina betrays Moon, being immune to her magic, and demands Globgor, Eclipsa and all other monsters as well as any monster sympathizers be taken and disposed of. Fortunately, River manages to sneak away with Globgor while Hekapoo, who snuck away from the other Magic High Commission members, rescues Star, Marco, Moon, Eclipsa and Meteora.
76b	20b	"The Tavern at the End of the Multiverse"	Tyler Chen & Brett Varon	Dominic Bisignano, Casey Crowe & Charlotte Jackson	Dominic Bisigano, Todd Casey, Aaron Hammersley, Amy Higgins, John Infantino & Daron Nefcy	May 12, 2019	420	0.35
Hekapoo takes the rescued to the Tavern at the End of the Multiverse to get away from magic. Eclipsa reveals that she knew that Moon planned Globgor's escape at her coronation and suggests that they either wait out Mewni's destruction or go back and fight. Janna and the injured warriors are still hiding when she witnesses Quirky Guy succumb to his wounds. River sneaks Globgor to the healing fountains. Star tells Marco that she hates magic and confronts Glossaryck, in his own realm. He reveals that Star's tapestry is finally finished, revealing that she successfully destroys magic. However, she is saddened to learn that Marco is not with her. Glossaryck tells her that once the magic is destroyed he will cease to exist and everyone returns home, including Marco. Star is devastated by the news, but returns to the tavern to tell Marco that she will destroy the magic.
77	21	"Cleaved"	Dominic Bisignano, Tyler Chen, Sage Cotugno & Aaron Hammersley	Dominic Bisignano, Tyler Chen, Sage Cotugno, Kristen Gish, Gina Gress, Amelia Lorenz & Cassie Zwart	Dominic Bisigano, Todd Casey, Aaron Hammersley, Amy Higgins, John Infantino & Daron Nefcy	May 19, 2019	421	0.33
In the series finale, as Star finally decides to destroy magic, she and Marco enter the magic dimension equipped with pudding, the only thing that can keep their minds clear. Star begins the whispering spell while Marco distracts a dark unicorn being ridden by a possessed Tom. Marco frees his mind with the pudding, but gets stabbed by the unicorn. Star's magic is not powerful enough, but she gets help from Eclipsa, Moon and Meteora and eventually the spirits of their ancestors. Mina, who was unwittingly informed by River where Star was, goes into the magic to stop them, but is distracted by Solaria helping Star and is taken out by a unicorn. They successfully complete the whispering spell, but Star and Marco stay behind in the magic to be with each other as long as they can. Star awakens back on Mewni to see the Solarian soldiers fall. Mina returns, powerless, and threatens that she will hang around. Ponyhead informs Star that Kelly and Talon returned to their respective dimensions while the High Commission most likely perished along with Glossaryck. Tom arrives to show Star a giant portal in the sky. Back on Earth, in the aftermath of a strong earthquake, Marco and Janna are recovering on ambulance gurneys when they spot the same portal. Janna distracts the doctors while Marco rides across the city, using Jackie's skateboard. Star runs towards her portal, avoiding obstacles. As they get close, the portals shrink and explode. Mewni and Earth, along with other magical worlds, have merged into one with humans being surprised by the abundance of creatures. Star and Marco walk up and greet each other as the series concludes.

=== Theme Song Takeover (2026) ===
Seven years after the series finale, Star vs. the Forces of Evil received a Theme Song Takeover segment with Eden Sher, Adam McArthur, and Alan Tudyk reprising their roles as Star, Marco, and Ludo, respectively. Despite most likely not being canon, it is established as taking place after the events of the series.

No.	Title	Original release date
1	"Ludo"	July 13, 2026
Star and Marco come down stairs to see that they are in a Disney Theme Song Takeover segment. Ludo, who has somehow broken into their house, announces his intent to take over the Star vs. the Forces of Evil theme in a jazzy rendition. He finally reveals that this was all a ploy to steal Star's wand again, only for her to tell him that it is gone, along with all the magic in the world. Ludo relents and announces that he will try to steal the Calamity Box from Amphibia instead.
