= Daron Nefcy =

American animator (born 1985)

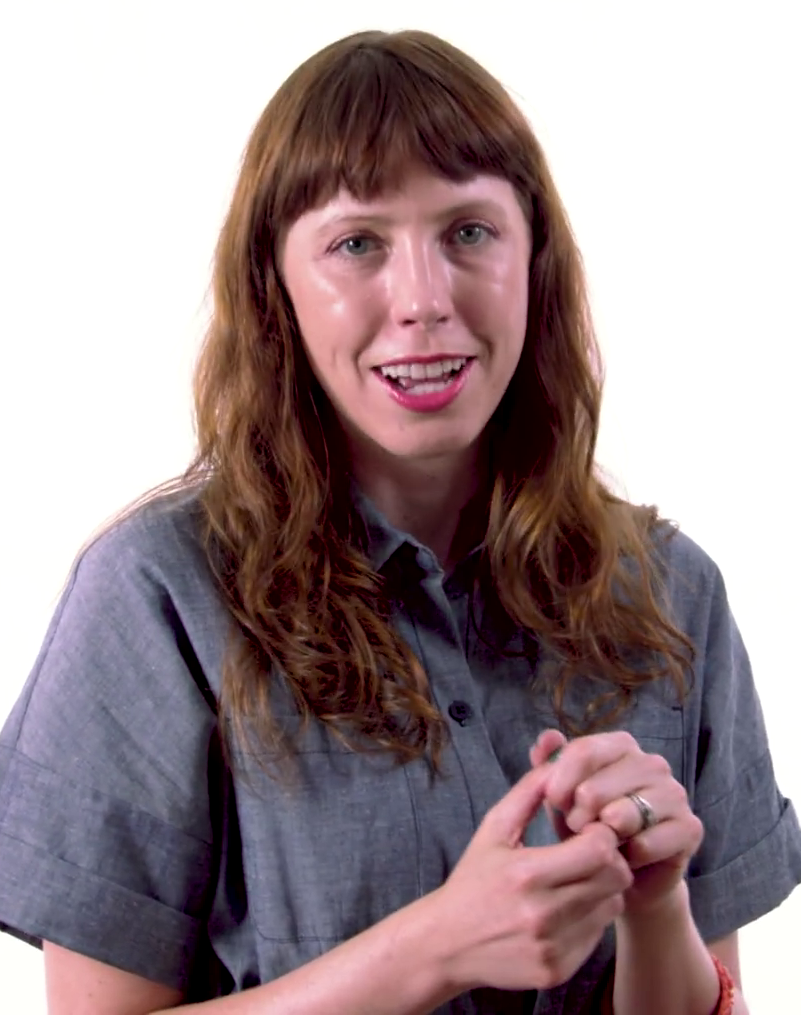
- Nefcy in 2018
- Born: Daron Leah Nefcy; November 26, 1985 (age 40); Los Angeles, California, U.S.
- Education: California Institute of the Arts (BFA, 2009)
- Occupations: Animator; cartoonist; storyboard artist; writer; producer; voice actor
- Years active: 2009–present
- Known for: Star vs. the Forces of Evil
- Spouse: Bobby Miller (m. 2015)
- Children: 1
- Website: www.daronnefcy.com

Daron Leah Nefcy (born November 26, 1985) is an American animator, cartoonist, storyboard artist, writer, producer, and voice actress. She is best known for being the creator and executive producer of the Disney XD and Disney Channel series Star vs. the Forces of Evil. She has also provided additional voice roles, most notably StarFan13. She is the second woman to create an original Disney Television Animation series, and the first since 1997's Pepper Ann from Sue Rose.

== Early life and education ==
Nefcy was born in Los Angeles, California. She has cited the Japanese anime series Sailor Moon as a major influence on her during middle school.

In her third year of college she came up with the character of Star Butterfly. She studied at the California Institute of the Arts (CalArts), where she graduated with a Bachelor of Fine Arts (BFA) in Character Animation in 2009.

== Career ==
Nefcy's early credits included Disney XD's Wander Over Yonder, where she worked alongside the show's creator Craig McCracken. She also worked on Robot and Monster (Nickelodeon), and was involved in Mad (Animation) as a designer. She worked on the family film Elle: A Modern Cinderella Tale as a character designer.

In 2012, she animated and co-wrote the segment "March" in the comedy anthology movie Holiday Road.

=== Star vs. the Forces of Evil ===
Nefcy first pitched an early version of the character Star Butterfly to Disney about four years before the show first aired. Her initial concept was Star as a young child with imaginary super powers. When one of the television executives suggested that Star should be a teenager with real magical powers, Nefcy came up with the idea of turning her into a foreign exchange student from another dimension where she is a princess. Nefcy worked on Star vs. the Forces of Evil for about three years before it first aired; following a one-year pilot phase, producing the first 13-episode season took two more years.

Her animated series debuted in 2015 and continued for four seasons, yielding top ratings for Disney, an avid social media fanbase, and spin-off books and online games.

=== Other projects ===
Nefcy directed an episode of We the People (2021), an animated TV series educating children about civics, produced by Barack and Michelle Obama. In October 2026, it was revealed that Nefcy returned to Disney Television Animation to develop new projects at the studio.

== Personal life ==
She is married to director Bobby Miller and they have one son together.

She is a member of the Democratic Party and helped canvass for Bernie Sanders during the 2020 United States presidential election.

In July 2024, Nefcy confirmed she was diagnosed with breast cancer, which she later recovered from after receiving treatment.

== Selected publications ==
Year	Title	Original publisher	ISBN	Notes
2018	The Magic Book of Spells	Disney Press	ISBN 978-1368020503	Co-written with Amber Benson, Dominic Bisignano, Devin Taylor and Laura Catrinella.
