= Megas XLR =

American animated television series

- Genre: Action; Science fiction; Mecha; Slapstick
- Created by: Jody Schaeffer; George Krstic
- Voices of: David DeLuise; Wendee Lee; Steve Blum; Scot Brutus Rienecker; Clancy Brown; Kevin Michael Richardson
- Opening theme: "Chicks Dig Giant Robots" (performed by Ragtime Revolutionaries)
- Country of origin: United States
- Original language: English
- No. of seasons: 2
- No. of episodes: 26

Production
- Executive producers: Jody Schaeffer; George Krstic; Brian A. Miller (season 2)
- Editor: Roger Hinze
- Running time: 22 minutes
- Production company: Cartoon Network Studios

Original release
- Network: Cartoon Network
- Release: May 1, 2004 – January 15, 2005

Related
- What a Cartoon!

Megas XLR is an American animated television series created by Jody Schaeffer and George Krstic for Cartoon Network. The series revolves around two slackers: mechanic Coop and his best friend Jamie, who find a mecha robot from the future called MEGAS (Mechanized Earth Guard Attack System) in a Jersey City, New Jersey junkyard. Coop modifies Megas and replaces his head, the control center, with a classic muscle car, and names him XLR (eXtra Large Robot). Together with Megas's original pilot Kiva, they must defend Earth from the evil alien race called "the Glorft". The series is an homage to, and parody of, mecha anime. Krstic was originally one of the co-creators of MTV's Downtown.

Schaeffer and Krstic conceived the idea of an animated series where the main character would pilot a giant robot utilizing his video gaming skills. The pilot episode, LowBrow, was shown in 2002 during Cartoon Network's Cartoon Cartoon Weekend Summerfest, to determine which pilot would become a new Cartoon Cartoon; it was the most popular among viewers. It aired on the Toonami block from May 1, 2004, to January 15, 2005, for two seasons (totaling 26 episodes), before being cancelled due to low ratings.

Despite low ratings, the series was met with positive reception. There have been various fan efforts and petitions to revive the show since its cancellation. Megas XLR was produced by Cartoon Network Studios; Titmouse, Inc. animated the main title and did animation work on Season 1.

== Overview ==
In the year 3037, Earth is fighting a losing war against the Glorft, a hostile alien race led by Gorrath (Clancy Brown). In a last, desperate attempt to save the planet, the human resistance steals a prototype mecha robot from the Glorft and modifies it into a powerful war machine, renaming it Megas (Mechanized Earth Guard Attack System). Their plan is to use a time-traveling device called a time drive to send Megas and its assigned pilot, Kiva Andru (Wendee Lee), two years into the past to the Battle of the Last Stand, which was the last major offensive fought by humanity against the Glorft. Humanity lost that battle, but the members of the resistance, particularly Kiva, believe that Megas can tip the scales and hand the Glorft a decisive defeat.

Before the plan can be executed, however, an attack by the Glorft forces the human resistance to send Megas back in time before proper preparations are made. Megas' head is blown off in the attack and its time drive is damaged, and the crippled robot is inadvertently sent to a junkyard in 1930s Jersey City, New Jersey. It remains there until a slacker mechanic named Harold "Coop" Cooplowski (David DeLuise) discovers it in approximately the year 2004. Coop turns Megas into a hot rod project robot by giving it a flaming paint job, replacing its head with a classic muscle car (resembling a car from the '70s MOPAR family; most likely a Plymouth Barracuda) and adding XLR (eXtra Large Robot) to its name.

While Coop is showing off the robot to his best friend Jamie (Steve Blum), Kiva travels to the 21st century to retrieve Megas and, upon discovering that only Coop can now pilot the robot due to his modifications to it, grudgingly agrees to train him in its use. However, Gorrath has followed her through time, forcing Kiva, Coop, and Jamie to team up and defend Earth against both Gorrath's forces and various other threats.

== Episodes ==
=== Series overview ===
Season	Episodes	Originally released	
Season	Episodes	First released	Last released
Pilot	—	August 23, 2002	
1	13	May 1, 2004	September 4, 2004
2	13	October 16, 2004	January 15, 2005

=== Pilot (2002) ===
No. in series	Title	Written by	Storyboarded and directed by	Original air date
Pilot	"LowBrow: Test Drive"	George Krstic	Chris Prynoski	August 23, 2002
During a routine trip to the garbage dump, suburban misfit Coop discovers an advanced robot from the future. Coop brings the treasure home and retools it to suit his modern-day slacker needs. Note: The pilot episode was aired as part of Cartoon Network's Cartoon Cartoon Weekend Summerfest marathon.

=== Season 1 (2004) ===
No. overall	No. in season	Title	Directed by	Written by	Storyboarded by	Original release date
1	1	"Test Drive"	Chris Prynoski	George Krstic	Chris Prynoski and Kelsey Mann	May 1, 2004
In the future, the Earth Coalition is fighting a losing war against the Glorft Imperium, a highly advanced extraterrestrial race with an insatiable hunger for conquest who are currently trying to recover a stolen mech codenamed "Avatar Prototype". Skilled 'mech pilot Kiva wants to send said mech, now renamed "Megas", back to a crucial part of the conflict, but accidentally sends it too far, and Megas winds up in the hands of couch potatoes Coop and Jamie. Worse, Kiva is stuck in the past with these boneheads, not to mention a Legion of really angry Glorft intent on capturing the Megas, even if they have to resort to using the giant UMD Mech to do it, which is at least 20 times bigger than the original Glorft mechs. Note: In this episode, some scenes are reanimated from "LowBrow".
2	2	"Battle Royale"	Chris Prynoski	Alain Matz	Chris Prynoski and Kelsey Mann	May 8, 2004
A floating alien head named Magnanimous (voiced by Bruce Campbell) sees Coop's fighting skills and invites him to the Galactic Combat Federation to fight various other powerful robots. Coop agrees, but maybe it would have been better if he had stayed home because, after a couple of fights, Magnanimous reveals he wants Coop to lose so Magnanimous can make a fortune. Coop refuses to accept those terms, so Magnanimous resorts to some dirty tricks to this end.
3	3	"All I Wanted Was a Slushie"	Chris Prynoski	Jack Monaco	Kelsey Mann and Bob Miller	May 15, 2004
It's a hot day in the city, and Coop just wants a big old thirst quenching Megaslush. However, he accidentally causes a highly destructive robot named the Replicant Engineered for Galactic Infiltration and Sabotage (R.E.G.I.S.) Mk V (voiced by Michael Dorn) to fall to Earth. Every time Coop gets close to getting his slush, the R.E.G.I.S. shows up and causes the store to be destroyed. Coop is tired of R.E.G.I.S.' continuous desire of destruction and shop-ravaging, but how is he supposed to stop a robot that gets bigger and stronger every time you smash it?
4	4	"The Fat & the Furious"	Chris Prynoski	Michael Kramer	Kelsey Mann, Jeff Hua, and Renato Otacan	May 1, 2004
Coop begins a bad day by accidentally creating a giant cheese monster and has to stop it, but the method he uses gets cheese in Megas's CPU core. Unaware of this, Coop enters Megas in an auto show, and is putting up a very good showing until Megas breaks down and nearly destroys the building. Fortunately, he's able to stop it, but now the Glorft see an opening to attack and invade the city, hoping to capture Megas. But first they need to find the CPU core.
5	5	"Buggin' the System"	Chris Prynoski	George Krstic	Juno Lee and Rick Del Carmen	May 29, 2004
Coop, Jamie and Kiva discover an ancient Ringworld while training. They discover it is actually a giant interstellar library with information on almost every species in the universe. Kiva is excited, because this could contain the key to defeating the Glorft and traveling back to the future. However, this Ringworld is infested with robotic, worm-like, energy loving bugs. Coop, in the end, ends up destroying the entire Ringworld when he destroys the worms' Queen.
6	6	"TV Dinner"	Chris Prynoski	Alain Matz	Renato Otacan and Jeff Hua	August 21, 2004
In an attempt to fix the television, Coop accidentally causes a blast of concentrated television waves to go out into space and attracts a giant, radio-wave eating monster to Earth. Due to the fact it is eating all the TV-satellites, it is impossible for anyone to watch any TV. Coop needs to stop this thing at all costs, but there's one major snag - how do you stop a monster the size of a planet that eats television waves, not to mention that it has a bunch of killer boogers inside its body?
7	7	"Breakout"	Chris Prynoski	Jack Monaco	Rick Del Carmen and Juno Lee	June 5, 2004
Coop buys a game cartridge from a garage sale, thinking it's a video game. In reality, it's an inter-dimensional prison for the galaxy's most dangerous criminals-the most dangerous of which is Grrkek The Planet Killer. So, naturally, Coop unleashes Grrkek first, but is able to beat him with a cool looking laser that traps Grrkek. However, he proceeds to unleash all the other prisoners (including one that looks like a robotic Gamera), which show their gratitude by trying to destroy the city. Naturally, Coop must clean up another one of his own series of messes.
8	8	"Dude, Where's My Head?"	Chris Prynoski	Michael Kramer and Alain Matz	Jeffrey Hua, Kelsey Mann, and Renato Otacan	July 31, 2004
In order to impress a girl, Jamie borrows Coop's car to take her for a ride. Unfortunately, Warmaster Gorrath arrives piloting a deadly replica of Megas (dubbed Mecha-Megas) who's destroying Jersey searching for Megas; naturally, everyone thinks that the fake is just Coop being destructive. So Coop must use his secondary command bridge to control Megas. However, this method is much more difficult, so Coop does rather badly. Even worse, Jamie accidentally activates the car's connection to Megas, so now he's in control of Megas, but he has no idea - he's just trying to have a date.
9	9	"Bad Guy"	Chris Prynoski	George Krstic	Rick Del Carmen and Juno Lee	May 22, 2004
A group of crime-fighting teenagers, called the S-Force, think Coop's the ultimate villain, so they come to Earth to try to "stop" him. Coop tries to fight them off and explain he's actually a hero, when darn the luck, Ender, a dangerous intergalactic criminal and The S-Force's Arch Nemesis, shows up to help him. Coop needs to defeat Ender, but the S-Force (and Ender) still don't get it.
10	10	"Junk in the Trunk"	Chris Prynoski	Jack Alvino	Jeff Hua and Kelsey Mann	August 14, 2004
Coop accidentally damages a vital part of Megas, the photonic stabilizer. Without it, Megas will go up in a blaze of fiery glory and explode, which will not only destroy Megas, but also, everything within a 100-mile radius. Fortunately, Coop found a junk planet that probably has just about everything. Unfortunately, Varshin the Dealer wants Megas' time drive to complete his own robot and sends various "zombie" robots to retrieve it. Even more unfortunate, Goat has come along for the ride, and is thoroughly annoying Kiva, not to mention he's fantasizing about a personal robot of his own without any idea how to get or build one properly.
11	11	"DMV: Department of Megas Violations"	Chris Prynoski	Jack Monaco	Enrique Del Carmen and Juno Lee	June 7, 2004
An intergalactic bounty hunter arrives, and soon after Megas is impounded due to parking regulations. Coop needs to get it back in order to save Kiva, who is the target of the bounty hunter. Unfortunately, Coop's license has expired, so now he has to pass for a new one at the DMV. As Kiva battles with the evil bounty hunter, Coop has to deal with an even scarier villain - the red tape of the Department of Motor Vehicles.
12	12	"Coop D'Etat"	Chris Prynoski	Alain Matz	Jeff Hua and Juno Lee	September 4, 2004
Coop accidentally destroys a sacred treasure of the Halcyon Worlds, a robotic, alien empire - the Flame of Azeroth. The Emperor declares whoever captures Megas and bring it to judgment will be named as the new Emperor, so now Coop has to fight off a bunch of Halcyonites in the deep, dark reaches of the final frontier, all of which are, if necessary, willing to destroy each other to become the Emperor.
13	13	"The Driver's Seat"	Chris Prynoski	George Krstic	Kelsey Mann	August 28, 2004
Coop accidentally teleports himself directly into the Karrajor, the Glorft Mothership, and now Kiva and Jamie have to figure out how to pilot Megas to save him. They do okay at first, but eventually crash into the Glorft mothership and get themselves - and Megas - captured. Fortunately, Gorrath foolishly lets Coop get the car, so Coop tears through the ship, intent on rescuing his friends and Megas. Now Coop must rescue everyone while finishing off the Glorft invasion once and for all, but how is he supposed to do that when the sheer amount of Glorft mech's overpowers even Megas and tears off several vital parts? Even worse, the Glorft have a new mech, the Karrajor in Mech mode, which is approx. 5 times larger than the UMD, which raises the question: how will Coop defeat this new threat with a critically damaged Megas?

=== Season 2 (2004–05) ===
No. overall	No. in season	Title	Directed by	Written by	Storyboarded by	Original release date
14	1	"Ultra Chicks"	Kelsey Mann	Alain Matz	Vincent Edwards, Juno Lee, and Bob Miller	October 16, 2004
In an effort to impress some Sailor Guardian-style alien space girls, known as the Ultra-Cadets, Jamie poses as Coop and is taken to their planet, where he learns the Ultra Cadets' city is in trouble from a giant fire monster. Armed only with an age-old, feminine robot, Jamie "fights" the monster and defeats it the way Coop always does: sheer luck. However, Coop arrives with Megas to save Jamie and gets into a fight with the giant mechanized Ultra Cadets. After leaving the planet, the Ultra Cadets find out that Jamie had thrown the fire monster into a volcano which made him more powerful. The episode ends with the more powerful fire monster about to attack their city.
15	2	"The Return"	Sue Perrotto	Jack Monaco and Alain Matz	Vincent Edwards, Juno Lee, and Jason Park	October 23, 2004
It's 5:01 and a video is due back at the rental store by 5:30, and Coop has to get it there on time to keep his membership from being revoked. However, Magnanimous appears and challenges Coop to protect his title against several robots, including one resembling Mr. T. Coop manages to beat the robots, but inadvertently challenges the entire galaxy to fight him - and the galaxy takes him up on the offer.
16	3	"Don't Tell Mom the Babysitter's Coop"	Kelsey Mann	Jack Alvino	Bob Miller, Brad Rader, and Fred Reyes	October 30, 2004
Coop inadvertently frees the Glorft from no-space, allowing Gorrath to start his revenge. The only thing Coop is worried about, however, is babysitting cousin Skippy, who is easily bored and hates everything about Coop's house. In an effort to get him to shut up, Coop takes Skippy to the moon in Megas. (Incredibly, he is still bored.) There he discovers the Glorft is plotting to smash the moon into the Earth. Coop has to fight off the Glorft while making sure Skippy doesn't end up Glorft fodder.
17	4	"Viva Las Megas"	Sue Perrotto	Andrew Robinson and Alain Matz	Dave Chlystek, Vincent Edwards, Juno Lee, and Jason Park	November 6, 2004
Coop, Jamie and Kiva head off to Las Vegas, and inadvertently discover Area 50. Coop accidentally activates a destructive energy-leech robot, who, due to severe and fatal programming errors, sees everything as "the enemy." Coop further screws up by directing the robot to Las Vegas. Now Coop must find a way to shut down the robot permanently before Las Vegas loses all its power. Coop in the end destroying the cities power source causing the robot to deactivate. And he then buried the robot in the Grand Canyon which he had to fill with dirt.
18	5	"Thanksgiving Throwdown!"	Kelsey Mann	Ford Riley	Brad Rader, Fred Reyes, and Octavio Rodríguez	November 27, 2004
Once again, Coop mistakenly releases a giant, plant-type alien menace that wants to destroy Earth and acquire its heat. Fortunately, Megas is too big for the plant to handle, so it has to find a bigger form. Unfortunately, this is Thanksgiving, and the spore fuses with a bunch of parade balloons to this end. Coop now must prevent the plant from wrecking the holiday.
19	6	"S-Force S.O.S."	Juno Lee, Kelsey Mann, and Sue Perrotto	Zeke Kamm and George Krstic	Vincent Edwards, Juno Lee, and Jason Park	November 13, 2004
The S-Force has been captured by an evil villain named Zarek, and he is planning to execute them. Fortunately, Jax escapes and (through the S-Force's mentor, Targon) manages to enlist Coop's help. Coop manages to save the S-Force from the "infinity zone," which Coop, Jamie, Kiva, the S-Force, and Megas fall into, but now Zarek is sending down an entire army to terminate them. It's Megas and the Ultra-Dimensional Power Zorp vs. a bunch of insect robots! The "gift" that Zarek offers Coop, Jamie and Kiva is an end to their lives, whereas the "gifts" Coop tries to give Zarek, but almost destroys the S-Force with, is actually thousands of missiles being fired at Zarek, due to the new Super Destructor Mode.
20	7	"Space Booty"	Sue Perrotto	George Krstic and Alain Matz	Brad Rader, Fred Reyes, and Octavio Rodríguez	November 20, 2004
Kiva gets some unwanted attention from Captain Warlock, a space pirate who goes for red heads, and now must make a choice between a possible time drive or two complete idiots. As usual, one wrong choice means certain death. Now Kiva must find a way to free Coop and Jamie as well as fend off the advances of one love sick space pirate and his mechanized crew.
21	8	"Terminate Her"	Kelsey Mann	Jack Monaco	Dave Chlystek, Vincent Edwards, and Jason Park	December 4, 2004
The Glorft, disguised as a motorcycle gang thanks to their latest Holo-Camouflages, comes to a rock concert. They're not there for entertainment, however - they want to eliminate Kiva's ancestor, which in turn would cause Kiva to cease to exist, which in turn would mean Megas would stay with the Glorft and never reach Coop, which would in turn doom Earth into extinction. Kiva and Jamie must protect the ancestor until Coop can get to Megas. To make matters worse, it seems that Jamie has fallen for Kiva's ancestor and she has fallen for him.
22	9	"Ice Ice Megas"	Sue Perrotto	Jack Alvino	Brad Rader, Fred Reyes, and Octavio Rodríguez	December 11, 2004
Coop crash-lands on an icy planet and ends up destroying its only mechanized guardian, who was a Cerilian gone rogue. Now he must protect the Yetis there from selfish, ice-hungry robots named the Cerilians, who use it to maintain their cooling systems. Trouble is, Megas is iced over, and does some of the Cerilian Army's work for them.
23	10	"A Clockwork Megas"	Sue Perrotto and Kelsey Mann	Zeke Kamm and Alain Matz	Brad Rader, Fred Reyes, and Bob Miller	December 18, 2004
Coop, Jamie and Kiva teleport themselves to a planet with brainwashed robots who act like sissies and workers. The alien who did it tries to do the same to Megas, but his brainwasher device only works on sentient robots. (Obviously, Coop's doesn't count.) Coop tries to put the alien out of business for good without unnecessarily destroying the prisoners. Coop in the end destroys the mind control device, freeing the robots. He then leaves the planet, unfortunately as the group leaves it's shown that the planet was actually a prison to the worst robots in the universe, who start destroying the planet after they leave.
24	11	"Universal Remote"	Kelsey Mann	Jack Monaco	Dave Chlystek, Vincent Edwards, and Jason Park	January 1, 2005
Coop's builds the world's most powerful universal remote - and Skalgar (who Coop and Jamie called "School Girl"), an ignorant, alien criminal with an inferiority complex, wants it, believing its (non-existent) destructive power can boost his reputation. Coop underestimates his short opponent and his equally short mech, and Skalgar teleports the remote to his own mech. Coop then typically destroys all of Jersey City (again), attempting to recover the remote.
25	12	"Rearview Mirror, Mirror" (Part One)	Sue Perrotto	Alain Matz	Brad Rader, Fred Reyes, and Bob Miller	January 8, 2005
In the last days of the Earth War, Jamie and Kiva were busy shutting down the Glorft Core Destroyer, while Coop and the Glorft, led by Gorrath as usual, were fighting out. However, Coop and Gorrath get transported to a mirror dimension - because of a game-pad combo that activated the Trans-dimension Device - where Coop meets his alternate self, a futuristic, evil, and muscular warlord version of himself at that, having defeated the Glorft, abandoned Megas, formed an Empire, and keeps on destroying - no matter the location, time, dimension and enemy. He also sees that Kiva has turned cyborg as well and is evil Coop's sidekick. Alternate Jamie, on the other hand, has lost his cowardice forever and became strong enough to try and defeat evil Coop and his empire with his Resistance (and on a side note, Jamie and Kiva were dating in the future). Coop and Gorrath must work together this time to stop mirror Coop and prevent him from ever destroying Earth again. In an attempt to stop evil Coop from destroying their dimension, Coop and Gorrath, assisted by alternate Jamie, launch a desperate assault on the evil Coop.
26	13	"Rearview Mirror, Mirror" (Part Two)	Kelsey Mann	George Krstic and Jack Alvino	Dave Chlystek, Vincent Edwards, and Jason Park	January 15, 2005
Tragically, Megas is (once again) critically damaged and Coop (in a suicide charge) gambles everything in attempting to stop the evil Coop, but only succeeds in getting his core critically damaged and causing Megas to finally be destroyed, but the protagonists suddenly realize that evil Coop abandoned his Megas in favor of his more warlike mech. Then evil Coop and his massive Grunt army invades Coop's dimension, and both of them swiftly create a giant battlefield, starting the big but short Dimensional War. On the Evil side, is evil Coop in his Black and Red Warlord Mech with hundreds of mindless Grunt 'Mechs and evil Kiva in her separate EC Mech, while the Good side, contains Coop in evil Coop's MEGAS, Gorrath in his personal Mech, including his army of Glorft Grunt 'Mechs. After a long and devastating battle that reduced the evil Coop's army into mere junk, mirror Coop and mirror Kiva retreat into the Dimensional Gate to return to his dimension. As soon as the mirror leaders entered the Dimensional Gate, Coop orders alternate Jamie (who remained in evil Coop's stronghold) to destroy the Gate, trapping Evil Coop and Evil Kiva stuck between worlds forever, never to cause annihilation of any dimension again (in this case, it was a world filled with Lerps - elf-like creatures similar to the Smurfs, but they can breathe flowers and go angry when attacked). Meanwhile, Coop decides to test what new gadgets the evil Coop installed into Megas and destroys the city once more in the process.

== Production ==
While playing video games, Jody Schaeffer and George Krstic came up with an idea of making an animated series in which the main character would use his video gaming skills to pilot a giant robot. The pilot short (LowBrow) was shown in 2002 as part of Cartoon Network's Cartoon Cartoon Weekend Summerfest, a contest to determine which pilot would be selected as the next Cartoon Cartoon. It was the most popular among viewers, and was greenlit as a series. Much of the series is inspired by Japanese mecha anime which the two grew up watching, with the animation being inspired by both anime and Western animation. The humour often pays homage to or mocks anime conventions.

== Broadcast ==
After being delayed from its original debut in December 2003, Megas XLR debuted on the Toonami block on May 1, 2004. However, due to low ratings, the series was cancelled after two seasons, with the final episode airing on January 15, 2005. Reruns continued to air sporadically from January 16 to September 24, 2005. During this time, the series was later moved to the graveyard slot of 3:30am on Friday nights/Saturday mornings, before being removed from the network altogether.

== Reception ==
=== Critical reception ===
Megas XLR was met with positive reception. In a retrospective analysis of Dave Trumbore from Collider said "It's actually a really funny and well-done series, but also because a listener (MrJake!) called in to recommend it; our cartoon lawyers say we're legally obligated to cover it. Just happy it's a good toon this time!". Roy from Cinemahub.com gave the show 3.5 rating out of 5 (Great) and wrote "While it's still hilarious and fun to watch, its action scenes fall short in comparison to present-day animated series."

Noah Dominguez of CBR.com said "It's clear the creative team behind Megas XLR had a lot of fun making it. As such, the fans had a lot of fun watching it. Its over-the-top premise and delightfully self-aware humor were complemented nicely by the dynamic between Coop, Jamie and Kiva. Coop is the slacker who's actually fairly capable despite himself, Jamie offers comic relief and Kiva is the straight man who also has a nice fish-out-of-water angle to work with. Plus, let's not forget that the show had an absolute banger of a theme song in Ragtime Revolutionaries' "Chicks Dig Giant Robots." In 2009, ToonZone ranked Megas XLR at No. 4 on of "Toons of the 2000s: Top 5 Cartoon Network Originals".

== Future ==
In late 2012, fans of the show on Twitter started using the hashtag #BringBackMegasXLR. The co-creator George Krstic and director Chris Prynoski announced they would bring back the show; seeing as Megas XLR had been written off by Cartoon Network, the studio Titmouse, Inc. would have to get the rights to the show. On April 29, 2013, George Krstic posted a tweet saying that he and Chris Prynoski were having a meeting at Titmouse to discuss bringing back the show along with Motorcity. However, in a 2014 interview George Krstic was quoted as saying: "Megas was written off as a tax loss and as such can not be exploited, at least domestically, in any way, or the network will get into some sort of tax/legal trouble." Because the show was used as a tax write-off the network would have to pay back the taxes they received from it and face large fines. It could also open the network up to tax fraud investigation. As of 8 February 2019, Krstic has stated that the rights to the series had successfully transferred ownership to Warner Brothers, though at this point it's too early and uncertain to tell what it could mean for the show's future.

In June 2025, co-creator Jody Schaeffer revealed that through its iTunes release and international sales, the show was able to make its money back and had been greenlit for a reboot a few years prior. However, the project was scrapped amidst the Warner Bros. Discovery merger.
