= List of Home: Adventures with Tip & Oh episodes =

American 2D-animated television series

Home: Adventures with Tip & Oh is an American 2D-animated television series produced by DreamWorks Animation and animated by Titmouse, which debuted in July 2016 as a Netflix original series.

== Series overview ==
Season	Segments	Episodes	Originally released
1	26	13	July 29, 2016
2	26	13	January 27, 2017
3	25	13	August 11, 2017
Special			December 1, 2017
4	26	13	July 20, 2018

== Episodes ==
=== Season 1 (2016) ===
No. overall	No. in season	Title	Story by	Written by	Storyboard by	Original release date
1a	1a	"Booving In"	Kristine Songco & Joanna Lewis	Kristine Songco, Joanna Lewis, Jim Mortensen, and Dakota McFadzean	Jim Mortensen (director); Dakota McFadzean	July 29, 2016
Oh moves in with Tip and her family.
1b	1b	"Sant-Oh"	Kristine Songco & Joanna Lewis	Kristine Songco, Joanna Lewis, Natasha Kline, and Bryan Mann	Natasha Kline (director); Bryan Mann	July 29, 2016
To beat a heatwave in Chicago, Oh acts as Santa Claus and devises a cool remedy.
2a	2a	"Little Kisses"	Ryan Crego & Thurop Van Orman	Ryan Crego, Thurop Van Orman, Bryan Mann, Nathan Bulmer, Erica Jones, and Carder Scholin	Bryan Mann (director); Nathan Bulmer, Erica Jones, and Carder Scholin	July 29, 2016
In revenge for Oh taking his role as captain, Smek plots to expose Oh's cat litter eating secret to keep Oh from getting kisses from Lucy.
2b	2b	"Snow Day"	Emily Brundige	Emily Brundige, Bryan Mann, Natasha Kline, Annisa Adjani, and Erica Jones	Bryan Mann and Natasha Kline (directors); Annisa Adjani and Erica Jones	July 29, 2016
After a snowstorm, terrified Boovs prepare to flee earth.
3a	3a	"It's a Secret"	Emily Brundige	Emily Brundige, Jeremy Bernstein, and Madeleine Flores	Jeremy Bernstein (director); Madeleine Flores	July 29, 2016
When Tip tells Oh a secret, Oh struggles to keep it to himself.
3b	3b	"Queen of Thighs"	Emily Brundige	Emily Brundige, Natasha Kline, and Annisa Adjani	Natasha Kline (director); Annisa Adjani	July 29, 2016
Tip and Oh help Lucy create a viral video.
4a	4a	"Krunkle Krush"	Carlos Kotkin & Richard Pursel	Carlos Kotkin, Richard Pursel, Thomas Hunter, and Carder Scholin	Thomas Hunter and Carder Scholin	July 29, 2016
Sure she is his ideal match, Oh goes on a date with crush Krunkle.
4b	4b	"Beauty Tip"	Emily Brundige	Emily Brundige, Maggie Kang, and Carder Scholin	Maggie Kang (director); Carder Scholin	July 29, 2016
Pom Pom goads Tip into competing in a beauty pageant.
5a	5a	"Boov Flu Blues"	Emily Brundige	Emily Brundige, Jim Mortensen, and Dakota McFadzean	Jim Mortensen (director); Dakota McFadzean	July 29, 2016
When Oh gets the Boov flu, Tip vows to take care of him.
5b	5b	"Get Me to the Gorg"	Kristine Songco & Joanna Lewis	Emily Brundige, Natasha Kline, and Annisa Adjani	Natasha Kline (director); Annisa Adjani	July 29, 2016
Tip and Oh are invited to the Gorg babies' party, so they travel through space to search for the perfect present.
6a	6a	"Kung Boov"	David Tennant	David Tennant, Maggie Kang, and Carder Scholin	Maggie Kang and Carder Scholin (directors)	July 29, 2016
After Tip urges Oh to stand up to bullies in the park, he goes crazy defending the city.
6b	6b	"The Werewolves of Chicago"	David Tennant	David Tennant, Dan O'Connor, and Erica Jones	Dan O'Connor (director); Erica Jones	July 29, 2016
Oh kidnaps a wolf on Halloween, thinking it will turn him into a werewolf.
7a	7a	"The Gray Matter"	Emily Brundige	Emily Brundige, Carder Scholin, and Erica Jones	Carder Scholin (director); Erica Jones	July 29, 2016
Tip and Oh encounter a cult of lost Boovs in a cave.
7b	7b	"Feverbreak"	Madison Bateman	Madison Bateman, Nick Bachman, and Nathan Bulmer	Nick Bachman (director); Nathan Bulmer	July 29, 2016
Tip is sick with a fever and believes that Donny killed Sharzod.
8a	8a	"Wrinkly Humans People"	David Tennant	David Tennant, Jeremy Bernstein, and Madeleine Flores	Jeremy Bernstein (director); Madeleine Flores	July 29, 2016
After finding out that Tip’s grandparents don’t like the Boov, Oh poses as a human.
8b	8b	"Piggy Piggy"	Carlos Kotkin & Richard Pursel	Carlos Kotkin, Richard Pursel, Nathan Bulmer, Madeleine Flores, and Thomas Hunter	Nathan Bulmer, Madeleine Flores, and Thomas Hunter	July 29, 2016
Oh and Tip search for Pig, unaware that he's being used as Sharzod's fashion accessory.
9a	9a	"Struck Through the Heart"	Kristine Songco & Joanna Lewis	Kristine Songco, Joanna Lewis, Dan O'Connor, and Nathan Bulmer	Dan O'Connor (director); Nathan Bulmer	July 29, 2016
After Oh becomes electrically charged, Tip helps him find a way to get rid of it.
9b	9b	"Boov Up and Drive"	David Tennant	David Tennant, Annisa Adjani, and David C. Smith	Annisa Adjani (director); David C. Smith	July 29, 2016
Tip gets pulled over by Kyle for driving Slushious without a license, causing her to take the Boovian driving test.
10a	10a	"Party of Slumber"	Emily Brundige	Emily Brundige, Jim Mortensen, and Dakota McFadzean	Jim Mortensen (director); Dakota McFadzean	July 29, 2016
Oh throws a slumber party in order to make more friends, much to Tip's dismay.
10b	10b	"Paranoid Activity"	Kristine Songco & Joanna Lewis	Kristine Songco, Joanna Lewis, Jeremy Bernstein, Madeleine Flores, and Nathan Bulmer	Jeremy Bernstein (director); Madeleine Flores	July 29, 2016
Determined that Oh will receive an award for safety, Kyle goes into full protective mode.
11a	11a	"Angerdome"	Emily Brundige	Emily Brundige, Dan O'Connor, and Nathan Bulmer	Dan O'Connor (director); Nathan Bulmer	July 29, 2016
To cool Tip's fiery temper, Oh takes her to planet called “Angerdome,” where her rage awakens a fierce foe.
11b	11b	"Tush Twins"	Kristine Songco & Joanna Lewis	Kristine Songco, Joanna Lewis, Annisa Adjani, and David C. Smith	Annisa Adjani (director); David C. Smith	July 29, 2016
When Lucy becomes friends with Sharzod, Tip thinks Sharzod is a bad influence.
12a	12a	"Sitting on Babies"	Madison Bateman, Kristine Songco & Joanna Lewis	Madison Bateman, Kristine Songco, Joanna Lewis, Jim Mortensen and Dakota McFadzean	Jim Mortensen (director); Dakota McFadzean	July 29, 2016
Tip and Oh struggle when babysitting the Gorg babies.
12b	12b	"Best Frenemies"	Emily Brundige	Emily Brundige, Jeremy Bernstein and Madeleine Flores	Jeremy Bernstein (director); Madeleine Flores	July 29, 2016
Smek pretends to be Oh's friend so he can find out Oh's fears and weaknesses, but then starts to realize what true friendship is.
13a	13a	"Podlings"	Emily Brundige	Emily Brundige, Natasha Kline and Bryan Mann	Natasha Kline (director); Bryan Mann	July 29, 2016
Oh has a family reunion with his podlings.
13b	13b	"Dumpster Dining"	Kristine Songco & Joanna Lewis	Kristine Songco, Joanna Lewis, Carder Scholin and Erica Jones	Carder Scholin (director); Erica Jones	July 29, 2016
The Boov appreciate Lucy's art at her shop, although not in the way she would expect.

=== Season 2 (2017) ===
No. overall	No. in season	Title	Story by	Written by	Storyboard by	Original release date
14a	1a	"Boy Boy Girl Band"	Madison Bateman	Madison Bateman, Carder Scholin and Erica Jones	Carder Scholin (director); Ben Bury and Erica Jones	January 27, 2017
At their favorite band’s concert, Tip and Oh accidentally ignite an inter-species crisis.
14b	1b	"Lords and Lazers"	Derek Iversen	Derek Iversen, Natasha Kline and Bryan Mann	Natasha Kline (director); Bryan Mann	January 27, 2017
K-Trong invites Tip and Oh to a virtual-game of Lords and Lazers.
15a	2a	"Tip's Deep Dish"	Emily Brundige	Emily Brundige, Natasha Kline and Bryan Mann	Natasha Kline (director); Bryan Mann	January 27, 2017
When Tip gets laryngitis, Oh helps step in as her voice to ask her crush to the Deep Dish Pizza dance.
15b	2b	"Garbage Day"	Derek Iversen	Derek Iversen, Annisa Adjani and David C. Smith	Annisa Adjani (director); Ben Bury and David C. Smith	January 27, 2017
Oh makes a time machine to help Tip redo a bad day.
16a	3a	"Very Foreign Exchange Student"	Clay Senechal	Clay Senechal, Carder Scholin and Erica Jones	Carder Scholin (director); Erica Jones	January 27, 2017
Tip agrees to be Die-Anne's peace mentor but struggles to set a good example.
16b	3b	"Pig's Tail"	Madison Bateman	Madison Bateman, Jeremy Bernstein and Tom Hunter	Jeremy Bernstein (director); Madeleine Flores	January 27, 2017
Tip gets a new perspective on life when she and Pig switch bodies.
17a	4a	"Big Brain Boov"	Clay Senechal	Clay Senechal, Nick Bachman and Nathan Bulmer	Nick Bachman (director); Nathan Bulmer	January 27, 2017
Stumped by one of Tip's math problems, Oh seeks help from the Big Brain Boov.
17b	4b	"Pook Pooks"	Emily Brundige	Emily Brundige, Jim Mortensen and Dakota McFadzean	Jim Mortensen (director); Dakota McFadzean	January 27, 2017
Oh struggles with Tip’s need for total “closest buds” comfort.
18a	5a	"Waltor"	Emily Brundige	Emily Brundige, Natasha Kline and Bryan Mann	Natasha Kline (director); Bryan Mann	January 27, 2017
A lonely Oh makes a friend at the aquarium.
18b	5b	"Out Foxed"	Emily Brundige	Emily Brundige, Carder Scholin and Erica Jones	Carder Scholin (director); Erica Jones	January 27, 2017
Fox tries to break up Tip and Oh's friendship.
19a	6a	"Le Grande Derriere"	Derek Iversen	Derek Iversen, Annisa Adjani, Ben Bury and David C. Smith	Annisa Adjani (director); Ben Bury and David C. Smith	January 27, 2017
Lucy is made head chef at a fancy Boov eatery, leaving Tip and Oh to run her shop.
19b	6b	"I'm Your Boovest Fan"	Derek Iversen & Clay Senechal	Derek Iversen, Clay Senechal, Nick Bachman and Nathan Bulmer	Nick Bachman (director); Nathan Bulmer	January 27, 2017
Oh learns about human sports and fandom by rooting for a T-Ball team.
20a	7a	"Scared Crazy"	Madison Bateman	Madison Bateman, Dan O'Connor and Nathan Bulmer	Dan O'Connor (director); Nathan Bulmer	January 27, 2017
While camping in the Boov woods, Kyle tells Tip and Oh a scary campfire story, which terrifies Oh.
20b	7b	"Superslushious"	Derek Iversen	Derek Iversen, Jim Mortensen and Dakota McFadzean	Jim Mortensen (director); Dakota McFadzean	January 27, 2017
After Oh reprograms her, Slushious becomes jealous of Tip.
21a	8a	"Inside Jokings"	Emily Brundige	Emily Brundige, Natasha Kline and Bryan Mann	Natasha Kline (director); Bryan Mann	January 27, 2017
Tip tries to explain to Oh what inside jokes are.
21b	8b	"It's A Jungle In There"	Clay Senechal	Clay Senechal, Carder Scholin and Erica Jones	Carder Scholin (director); Erica Jones	January 27, 2017
Tip babysits Oh's new plant, carelessly turning it into a monster.
22a	9a	"Dang You Saved My Life"	Emily Brundige	Emily Brundige, Annisa Adjani and David C. Smith	Annisa Adjani (director); David C. Smith	January 27, 2017
After Tip saves Sharzod’s life, Sharzod becomes obsessed with repaying the debt.
22b	9b	"Boovsland Noir"	Clay Senechal	Clay Senechal, Jim Mortensen and Dakota McFadzean	Jim Mortensen (director); Dakota McFadzean	January 27, 2017
Sharzod hires Kyle as a detective to find her lost 'mojo.'
23a	10a	"Nuttypunny"	Emily Brundige	Emily Brundige, Jim Mortensen and Dakota McFadzean	Jim Mortensen (director); Dakota McFadzean	January 27, 2017
Tip and Oh play a popular Boov sport called "Nuttypunny."
23b	10b	"JealOhsy"	Clay Senechal	Clay Senechal, Jeremy Bernstein and Tom Hunter	Jeremy Bernstein (director); Tom Hunter	January 27, 2017
Oh is jealous when he sees his ex-flame Krunkle with another Boov.
24a	11a	"Sacks O' Cash"	Emily Brundige	Emily Brundige, Annisa Adjani and David C. Smith	Annisa Adjani (director); David C. Smith	January 27, 2017
Eager to earn cash, Tip and Oh start an extraterrestrial taxi service.
24b	11b	"Oh Give Me A Home"	Clay Senechal	Clay Senechal, Nick Bachman and Nathan Bulmer	Nick Bachman (director); Nathan Bulmer	January 27, 2017
When Smek is kicked out of the Mopo, Oh helps him find a new home.
25a	12a	"Breakers"	Emily Brundige	Emily Brundige, Madeleine Flores and Faryn Pearl	Jeremy Bernstein (director); Madeleine Flores, Faryn Pearl and Angelica Russell	January 27, 2017
A rowdy group of partying aliens threaten to ruin Oh's dream family vacation.
25b	12b	"A Day Without Tech"	Madison Bateman	Madison Bateman, Jeremy Bernstein and Tom Hunter	Jeremy Bernstein (director); Tom Hunter and Faryn Pearl	January 27, 2017
When Boov technology crashes, Oh feels he must become more independent.
26a	13a	"The Cloud"	Madison Bateman	Madison Bateman, Natasha Kline and Bryan Mann	Natasha Kline (director); Bryan Mann	January 27, 2017
Tip goes overboard when using Boov technology to declutter her room.
26b	13b	"Booverty"	Emily Brundige	Emily Brundige, Annisa Adjani and David C. Smith	Annisa Adjani (director); David C. Smith	January 27, 2017

=== Season 3 (2017) ===
No. overall	No. in season	Title	Story by	Written by	Storyboard by	Original release date
27a	1a	"Queen of Police"	Emily Brundige	Emily Brundige, Jim Mortensen, Dakota McFadzean and Faryn Pearl	Jim Mortensen (director); Dakota McFadzean and Faryn Pearl	August 11, 2017
When Tip takes over Kyle's job for a day, she bans all Boov rules.
27b	1b	"Roidian Prom"	Emily Brundige	Emily Brundige, Carder Scholin and Erica Jones	Carder Scholin (director); Erica Jones	August 11, 2017
Tip and Oh help Die-Anne attend her prom.
28a	2a	"Where the Koobish Roam"	Johanna Stein	Johanna Stein, Jeremy Bernstein and Thomas Hunter	Jeremy Bernstein (director); Thomas Hunter	August 11, 2017
Tip and Oh join Krunkle on an old fashioned Koobish cattle drive.
28b	2b	"Best Friendiversary"	Johanna Stein	Johanna Stein, Natasha Kline and Bryan Mann	Natasha Kline (director); Bryan Mann	August 11, 2017
When Oh lavishes Tip with Friendiversary gifts, she scrambles to reciprocate in kind.
29a	3a	"Citizen Brain"	Clay Senechal	Clay Senechal, Annisa Adjani and David C. Smith	Annisa Adjani (director); David C. Smith	August 11, 2017
The Big Brain Boov recruit Oh to help them understand humans.
29b	3b	"Liar Liar Pods on Fire"	Clay Senechal	Clay Senechal, Jeremy Bernstein and Thomas Hunter	Jeremy Bernstein (director); Thomas Hunter	August 11, 2017
Tip teaches Oh about lying, but soon Oh's lies spin out of control.
30a	4a	"Chercophonie"	Johanna Stein	Johanna Stein, Nick Bachman and Nathan Bulmer	Nick Bachman (director); Nathan Bulmer	August 11, 2017
Tip faces a dilemma when Boov pop star Chercophonie promotes her awful singing. Note: Features Cher as the voice of Chercophonie.
30b	4b	"Oh, Man, and the Sea"	Clay Senechal	Clay Senechal, Jim Mortensen and Dakota McFadzean	Jim Mortensen (director); Dakota McFadzean	August 11, 2017
Donny teaches Oh to be in control of his own emotions by taking him to go fishing.
31a	5a	"Hard to Gettings"	Morgan J. Steele	Morgan J. Steele, Annisa Adjani and David C. Smith	Annisa Adjani (director); David C. Smith	August 11, 2017
Oh is faced with a problem when Sharzod develops a crush on him.
31b	5b	"Tummy Fish"	Johanna Stein	Johanna Stein, Nick Bachman and Nathan Bulmer	Nick Bachman (director); Nathan Bulmer	August 11, 2017
Tip and Oh need to find a new Boov host for his tummy fish parasites.
32a	6a	"Stick with Me"	Emily Brundige	Emily Brundige, Carder Scholin and Erica Jones	Carder Scholin (director); Erica Jones	August 11, 2017
Stick tries to romance Tip as Oh keeps his pal Fox busy.
32b	6b	"Family Feudings"	Johanna Stein	Johanna Stein, Natasha Kline and Bryan Mann	Natasha Kline (director); Bryan Mann	August 11, 2017
Oh builds a memory device to find out why Lucy and her sister hate each other.
33a	7a	"Cats! The Planet"	Johanna Stein	Johanna Stein, Carder Scholin and Erica Jones	Carder Scholin (director); Erica Jones	August 11, 2017
Tip and Oh rescue Pig from a strange planet after being abducted.
33b	7b	"Selfie-ish"	Lindsay Kerns	Lindsay Kerns, Natasha Kline and Bryan Mann	Natasha Kline (director); Bryan Mann	August 11, 2017
Tip and Oh's internet selfies become a hit, turning her into a social media addict.
34a	8a	"Newbeings on the Block"	Johanna Stein	Johanna Stein, Annisa Adjani and David C. Smith	Annisa Adjani (director); David C. Smith	August 11, 2017
Oh grows jealous when Tip starts paying more attention to their new lovable alien neighbor.
34b	8b	"Juicy Gossip"	Lindsay Kerns	Lindsay Kerns, Nick Bachman and Nathan Bulmer	Nick Bachman (director); Nathan Bulmer	August 11, 2017
While trying to help Lucy join the gossipy Juicy Crew, Oh overshares her embarrassing secrets.
35a	9a	"Humanspeople Safari"	Clay Senechal	Clay Senechal, Jim Mortensen and Dakota McFadzean	Jim Mortensen (director); Dakota McFadzean	August 11, 2017
Oh tries to help Tip see the good in humans by taking her on a Boov humanspeople safari.
35b	9b	"Happy Space Troopers"	Clay Senechal	Clay Senechal, Jeremy Bernstein and Thomas Hunter	Jeremy Bernstein (director); Thomas Hunter	August 11, 2017
After being rejected by Pom Pom and her troopers, Tip and Oh decide to make their own adventure troop.
36a	10a	"Krebbles Is Real"	Johanna Stein	Johanna Stein, Natasha Kline and Bryan Mann	Natasha Kline (director); Bryan Mann	August 11, 2017
To calm an upset Oh, Tip films new episodes of a kids show he believes is real.
36b	10b	"Tip's Diary"	Emily Brundige	Emily Brundige, Carder Scholin and Erica Jones	Carder Scholin (director); Erica Jones	August 11, 2017
After Tip finds out Oh has been reading her diary, she plots revenge.
37a	11a	"The Great Chicago Hot Dog Crisis"	Clay Senechal	Clay Senechal, Jim Mortensen and Dakota McFadzean	Jim Mortensen (director); Dakota McFadzean	August 11, 2017
Tip and Oh tell the story of how they helped humans and Boov bond over hot dogs.
37b	11b	"Wrinkly Humans Kids"	Katie Mattila	Katie Mattila, Jeremy Bernstein and Ben Bury	Jeremy Bernstein (director); Ben Bury	August 11, 2017
After drinking Boov crazy juice, Tip’s grandparents go wild.
38a	12a	"True Romancings"	Katie Mattila	Katie Mattila, Nick Bachman and Nathan Bulmer	Nick Bachman (director); Nathan Bulmer	August 11, 2017
Tip and Oh compete to find the perfect date for romance-deprived Lucy.
38b	12b	"Hardcore Harbor"	Johanna Stein	Johanna Stein, Annisa Adjani and David C. Smith	Annisa Adjani (director); David C. Smith	August 11, 2017
When at the water park, Tip exhausts herself saving Oh and Elrod from danger.
39	13	"A Thuper Hero Thtory"	Lindsay Kerns & Morgan J. Steele	Lindsay Kerns, Morgan J. Steele, Jeremy Bernstein, Jim Mortensen, Ben Bury and Dakota McFadzean	Jeremy Bernstein and Jim Mortensen (directors); Ben Bury and Dakota McFadzean	August 11, 2017
Tip and Oh race to stop Elrod before he takes all of Earth’s water. Notes: This is the series' first half-hour special. • This is Elrod’s final appearance

=== Special (2017) ===
Title	Directed by	Written by	Storyboard by	Original release date
"Home for the Holidays"	Blake Lemons	Story by: Ryan Crego and Todd Garfield; Written by: Ryan Crego, Todd Garfield and Blake Lemons	Nick Bachman, Jeremy Bernstein, Nathan Bulmer, Ben Bury, Colin Heck, Erica Jones, Bryan Mann, Faryn Pearl, Carder Scholin and David C. Smith	December 1, 2017
Tip teaches Oh about Christmas and the joys of it. Guest stars: Ben Schwartz as himself Kelly Clarkson as herself Note: This is the series' first 1–hour special.

=== Season 4 (2018) ===
No. overall	No. in season	Title	Story by	Written by	Storyboard by	Original release date
40a	1a	"Friend Like Tip"	Lindsay Kerns	Lindsay Kerns, Carder Scholin & Erica Jones	Carder Scholin (director); Erica Jones	July 20, 2018
40b	1b	"Like Mother, Like Pit of Fire"	Johanna Stein	Johanna Stein, Natasha Kline & Bryan Mann	Natasha Kline (director); Bryan Mann	July 20, 2018
41a	2a	"Sticky Situation"	Lindsay Kerns	Lindsay Kerns, Carder Scholin & Erica Jones	Carder Scholin (director); Erica Jones	July 20, 2018
41b	2b	"The Freshmans"	Katie Mattila	Katie Mattila, Natasha Kline & Bryan Mann	Natasha Kline (director); Bryan Mann	July 20, 2018
42a	3a	"Humanning"	Johanna Stein	Johanna Stein, Nick Bachman & Nathan Bulmer	Nick Bachman (director); Nathan Bulmer	July 20, 2018
42b	3b	"Know It All"	Clay Senechal	Clay Senechal, Anissa Adjani & David C. Smith	Annisa Adjani (director); David C. Smith	July 20, 2018
43a	4a	"Only the Lucky Survive"	Katie Mattila	Katie Mattila, Jeremy Bernstein & Ben Bury	Jeremy Bernstein (director); Ben Bury	July 20, 2018
43b	4b	"Sharsquad"	Johanna Stein	Johanna Stein, Natasha Kline & Bryan Mann	Natasha Kline (director); Bryan Mann	July 20, 2018
44a	5a	"Big Bad Love"	Johanna Stein	Johanna Stein, Jim Mortensen & Dakota McFadzean	Jim Mortensen (director); Dakota McFadzean	July 20, 2018
44b	5b	"The Milk Job"	Katie Mattila	Katie Mattila, Jeremy Bernstein & Ben Bury	Jeremy Bernstein (director); Ben Bury	July 20, 2018
45a	6a	"Once Upon a Girl Day"	Lindsay Kerns	Lindsay Kerns, Anissa Adjani & Faryn Pearl	Annisa Adjani (director); Faryn Pearl	July 20, 2018
45b	6b	"Cop College"	Katie Mattila	Katie Mattila, Nick Bachman & Nathan Bulmer	Nick Bachman (director); Nathan Bulmer	July 20, 2018
46a	7a	"Walkaboov"	Lindsay Kerns	Lindsay Kerns, Nick Bachman & Nathan Bulmer	Nick Bachman (director); Nathan Bulmer	July 20, 2018
46b	7b	"Big Boy Boy"	Katie Mattila	Katie Mattila, Anissa Adjani, David C. Smith & Faryn Pearl	Annisa Adjani (director); David C. Smith and Faryn Pearl	July 20, 2018
47a	8a	"No Age Like the Present"	Johanna Stein	Johanna Stein, Natasha Kline & Bryan Mann	Natasha Kline (director); Bryan Mann	July 20, 2018
47b	8b	"So Garfeldt"	Katie Mattila	Katie Mattila, Anissa Adjani & Faryn Pearl	Annisa Adjani (director); Faryn Pearl	July 20, 2018
48a	9a	"The Secret Life of Oh"	Lindsay Kerns	Lindsay Kerns, David C. Smith & Nathan Bulmer	David C. Smith (director); Nathan Bulmer	July 20, 2018
48b	9b	"Beings Bad"	Katie Mattila	Katie Mattila, Jeremy Bernstein & Ben Bury	Jeremy Bernstein (director); Ben Bury	July 20, 2018
49a	10a	"Rekindling Retreat"	Katie Mattila	Katie Mattila, Natasha Kline & Bryan Mann	Natasha Kline (director); Bryan Mann	July 20, 2018
49b	10b	"Trashbassador"	Lindsay Kerns	Lindsay Kerns, Carder Scholin & Erica Jones	Carder Scholin (director); Erica Jones	July 20, 2018
50a	11a	"Big Silly"	Morgan Steele	Morgan Steele, Anissa Adjani & Faryn Pearl	Annisa Adjani (director); Faryn Pearl	July 20, 2018
50b	11b	"Smek Chills Out"	Lindsay Kerns	Lindsay Kerns, David C. Smith & Dakota McFadzean	David C. Smith (director); Dakota McFadzean	July 20, 2018
51a	12a	"Not My Boy Brandon"	Lindsay Kerns	Lindsay Kerns, Carder Scholin & Erica Jones	Carder Scholin (director); Erica Jones	July 20, 2018
51b	12b	"Shady Shawn"	Katie Mattila	Katie Mattila, David C. Smith & Dakota McFadzean	David C. Smith (director); Dakota McFadzean	July 20, 2018
52a	13a	"B.R.A.P."	Johanna Stein	Johanna Stein, Jeremy Bernstein & Ben Bury	Jeremy Bernstein (director); Ben Bury	July 20, 2018
52b	13b	"It's a Booviful Life"	Johanna Stein	Johanna Stein, David C. Smith & Dakota McFadzean	David C. Smith (director); Dakota McFadzean	July 20, 2018
