= The Second Best Hospital in the Galaxy =

American animated series

- Genre: Science fiction comedy; Medical drama
- Created by: Cirocco Dunlap
- Showrunner: Cirocco Dunlap
- Voices of: Kieran Culkin; Stephanie Hsu; Natasha Lyonne; Keke Palmer; Maya Rudolph; Sam Smith
- Country of origin: United States
- Original language: English
- No. of seasons: 2
- No. of episodes: 16

Production
- Executive producers: Cirocco Dunlap; Maya Rudolph; Natasha Lyonne; Danielle Renfrew Behrens; Shauna McGarry; Shannon Prynoski; Chris Prynoski; Antonio Canobbio; Ben Kalina
- Producer: Asha Michelle Wilson
- Production companies: Amazon MGM Studios; Animal Pictures; Titmouse, Inc.

Original release
- Network: Amazon Prime Video
- Release: February 23, 2024 – May 27, 2025

The Second Best Hospital in the Galaxy is an American adult animated science fiction comedy series created by Cirocco Dunlap for the streaming service Amazon Prime Video. The series centers on two intergalactic surgeons and best friends as they treat illnesses throughout the galaxy, and was produced by Amazon MGM Studios, Animal Pictures, and Titmouse, Inc., with Dunlap as showrunner.

The series stars the voices of Kieran Culkin, Stephanie Hsu, Natasha Lyonne, Keke Palmer, Maya Rudolph, Sam Smith, Andrew Dismukes, Gary Anthony Williams, and Lennon Parham. Dunlap first conceived the series after wondering how it would be if there were people who could treat the ailments of characters in science-fiction movies. The series was announced in 2022, with Rudolph and Lyonne also set to executive produce. The series draws heavy inspiration from Dunlap's personal life, particularly in its depiction of anxiety. Animation services were provided by Titmouse, Inc.

The Second Best Hospital in the Galaxy premiered on Amazon Prime Video in February 23, 2024, to a generally positive reception. A second season was released on May 27, 2025.

== Premise ==
The series is a science fiction medical comedy set in the Ergulon Galaxy in the year 14002. It centers on two female alien surgeons, Drs. Sleech and Klak, as they treat patients with illnesses evocative of common science fiction tropes, such as an alien parasite that feeds off its host's cortisol and a patient trapped in a time loop, while trying to balance their personal and professional lives.

The setting of this premise is similar to that of Sector General, but emphasising humor more.

== Cast and characters ==
=== Main ===
- Stephanie Hsu as Dr. Nak Nak Sleech
- Keke Palmer as Dr. Klak
- Natasha Lyonne as Nurse Tup
- Kieran Culkin as Dr. Plowp
- Maya Rudolph as Dr. Vlam
- Sam Smith as Dr. Azel

=== Recurring ===
- Andrew Dismukes as Matt
- Gary Anthony Williams as Flork 1
- Lennon Parham as Flork 2

== Episodes ==
=== Season 1 (2024) ===
No. overall	No. in season	Title	Directed by	Written by	Original release date
1	1	"Sometimes Heads Break"	Joey Adams	Cirocco Dunlap	February 23, 2024
Doctors Klak and Sleech are assigned to take care of Glurk, a patient with a history of anxiety who has been showing extreme relaxation after developing a lump. The duo discover via a nanobot examination that the lump is caused by a parasitic lifeform attached to Glurk's brain that feeds itself by eradicating anxiety but risks causing her head to explode. After Glurk says she has been previously taken care of by Klak's ex-partner, Dr. Azel, Klak decides to call them to consult. Azel warns them studying the parasite could be dangerous, but the duo decide to treat her and study the parasite to win a grant. The duo initially tries to starve the parasite by reducing Glurk's anxiety, but the parasite fights off the treatment. Klak, who has been dealing with anxiety herself, realizes she can use it attract the parasite to her. The parasite attempts to attach itself to Klak, who enjoys the pleasure it brings, but Sleech cuts it off before it could attach itself fully to her. The duo secretly keep the parasite and decide to study its effects on mental health, even though it risks ending their careers. Meanwhile, intern doctor Vlam helps a patient in a comatose state, with whom she falls in love, but the patient forgets everything upon waking up.
2	2	"The Land of Sex and Death"	Becks Wallace	Shauna McGarry	February 23, 2024
3	3	"Tomorrow's Death is Yesterday's Problem"	Kacie Hermason	Anne Lane	February 23, 2024
4	4	"The Curse of Orlosh"	Joey Adams	Kirsten King	February 23, 2024
5	5	"Beef Sturgeon Sleech"	Joey Adams	Asha Michelle Wilson	February 23, 2024
6	6	"That's Science, Baby!"	Kacie Hermason	Joanna Bradley	February 23, 2024
7	7	"Just One More Adjustment"	Joey Adams	Anne Lane	February 23, 2024
8	8	"Apocalypse Got You Down?"	Becks Wallace	Cirocco Dunlap	February 23, 2024

=== Season 2 (2025) ===
No. overall	No. in season	Title	Directed by	Written by	Original release date
9	1	"Deep Cuts"	Kacie Hermanson	Joanna Bradley	May 27, 2025
10	2	"Hoogadoon Beach"	Joey Adams	Cirocco Dunlap & Cooper Villalon Nelson	May 27, 2025
11	3	"Lone Space Wolf"	Becks Wallace	Shauna McGarry	May 27, 2025
12	4	"Should We Buy a Spaceship That's Also a Can Opener?"	Kacie Hermanson	Heather Dean & Rosie Borchert	May 27, 2025
13	5	"This Is Why I Don't Go to Parties"	Joey Adams	Kirsten King	May 27, 2025
14	6	"Zoik Zoik Zoik!"	Becks Wallace	Anne Lane	May 28, 2025
15	7	"Welcome to Pweek"	Kacie Hermanson	Cirocco Dunlap	May 27, 2025
16	8	"Sedate That Tentacle!"	Joey Adams	Shauna McGarry & Cirocco Dunlap	May 27, 2025

== Production ==
=== Development ===
Cirocco Dunlap first conceived the concept for the series while watching the film Groundhog Day. As she watched the film, she pondered how it would be if there were doctors that could help people deal with incidents like the one depicted in the film. This inspired her to create a show about a hospital where characters such as The Thing from John Carpenter's 1982 film served as patients. She wanted Natasha Lyonne to work with her on the show due to their previous collaboration in the series Russian Doll. Having liked the idea, Lyonne agreed to work on the project in addition to hiring Maya Rudolph as an executive producer; Rudolph wanted to work on the series due to its optimistic depiction of the future.

In May 23, 2022, it was announced that Amazon Studios has given a two-season order to The Hospital, an animated series created by Dunlap and executive produced by Rudolph and Lyonne via their Animal Pictures production banner, with Titmouse, Inc. also producing. Dunlap was set to serve as showrunner for the series, which has been in development since 2020. The series had been renamed as The Second Best Hospital in the Galaxy by December 2023; the name originated as a tagline for the show, before being turned into its title at Amazon's request, something Dunlap agreed to. Production on the series took place during the COVID-19 pandemic.

Writing for season 2 took place during production for season 1, with Dunlap treating it as developing a single 16-episode series. Dunlap has also expressed interest in a third season that could further explore certain characters.

=== Writing ===
The writer's room for the series was composed entirely of female and LGBTQ+ writers. Dunlap based part of the show on her personal life, with the series' focus on anxiety being inspired by Dunlap's own struggles with anxiety over the years. Her initial pitch for the series originally had anxiety as an episodic theme and a bigger focus on time travel, before anxiety transitioned into a season-long theme at Lyonne's suggestion as the writers developed the first season and struggled to find a thematic resonance for time travel. She also used her experiences struggling with anxiety as an inspiration for individual episode plots, such as an episode where Dr. Klak deals with "magical thoughts". She also drew inspiration from her personal experience dating for Klak and Sleech's relationships. The series' depiction of LGBTQ+ representation and its lack of focus on the characters' sexual orientation and gender identity were inspired by Dunlap growing up in a LGBTQ+-friendly environment. This was also inspired by Star Trek, and how the show was inclusive for its time without being overt. Additional inspirations for the show include Aliens and Grey's Anatomy, with Dunlap seeking to combine science fiction with medical dramas. Dunlap's personal love for gallows humor also inspired the show's sense of humor.

Additionally, Dunlap wanted the show to have an emotional honesty that would ground the series, with the leads generally talking to each other through "conversations we all have with a good friend that we might work with". While the writers wanted to "to find the sci-fi ideas that matter, or that hurt, or feel exciting, or there's something in them that feels human or relatable", so they wrote illnesses that were "wacky and crazy" but at the same time "[had] some real emotional heart". The production team also consulted with real-life scientists and doctors in order to give them "a logic that kind of could make them make sense". Each season focuses on a different character, with season 1 being described by Dunlap as "Klak's journey" while season 2 is "a little bit more about Sleech".

=== Animation ===
In addition to producing, Titmouse, Inc. also provided animation services for the series; Dunlap hired the studio due to both having worked on the series Big Mouth. Copa Studio and Mighty Animation also provided animation for the series. Robin Eisenberg serves as production designer on the show, Dunlap having hired her due to being a fan of her work. Dunlap and Eisenberg worked together on developing the art style for the show, with Dunlap pitching Eisenberg ideas on the show's world. For the aliens, Eisenberg drew inspiration from sealife, watching images of different sea creatures and combining them to conceive their designs, before giving them to the art team, who would come up with their own ideas. Eisenberg also wanted the color palette to "have this sense of fun" without being too "soft" in order to reflect the series' comedic tone. The artists added details such as "tiny bits of tape on things" in order to give the series a sense of realism.

=== Music ===
The score for the series was composed by Wendy & Lisa, who created a score that was reminiscent of science fiction and medical dramas.

== Release ==
The Second Best Hospital in the Galaxy was released on February 23, 2024, on Amazon Prime Video.

== Reception ==
The first season received generally positive reviews from critics. The review aggregator website Rotten Tomatoes reported a 94% approval rating based on 18 critic reviews. Metacritic, which uses a weighted average, assigned the season a score of 83 out of 100 based on 5 critic reviews, indicating "universal acclaim".

The Escapist gave the first season a mixed review, describing it as "Scrubs animated and in outer space/the future"; although the review criticized some of the humor as cliché and unfunny, it said the series improved once it focused more on its characters. The Michigan Daily described the series as a "wacky, heartfelt adventure".

== Accolades ==
At the 56th NAACP Image Awards, Keke Palmer was nominated for Outstanding Character Voice-Over Performance (Television) for her work on the series.
