= Transformers: War for Cybertron Trilogy =

Toyline and transmedia franchise

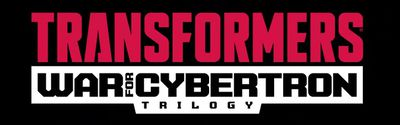
- Original work: Transformers: Generation 1 by Hasbro and Takara
- Owner: Hasbro

Films and television
- Animated series: Transformers: War for Cybertron - Siege (Netflix, 2020); Transformers: War for Cybertron - Earthrise (Netflix, 2020); Transformers: War for Cybertron - Kingdom (Netflix, 2021)

Miscellaneous
- Toy(s): Transformers: Generations

Transformers: War for Cybertron Trilogy is a toyline and transmedia series that is part of the Transformers franchise by Hasbro announced in February 2018.

== Toy-line ==
The toy-line is split into three subline imprints titled "Siege", "Earthrise", and "Kingdom" respectively. All of the designs are based on the Generation 1 and Beast Wars series. Mass retail figures were sold in prices ranging from $5USD to $160USD.

== Television series ==
Transformers: War for Cybertron Trilogy
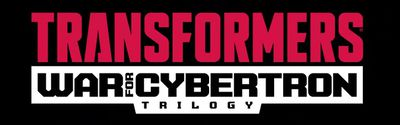
- Genre: Science fiction Action
- Based on: Transformers by Hasbro and Takara Tomy
- Screenplay by: F. J. DeSanto; George Krstic; Brandon Easton; Gavin Hignight; Tim Sheridan; Mae Catt
- Story by: F. J. DeSanto; George Krstic
- Directed by: Takashi Kamei (Note: Chief/Supervising Director (総監督).)
- Composer: Alexander Bornstein
- Countries of origin: United States; Japan
- Original language: English
- No. of seasons: 3
- No. of episodes: 18

Production
- Executive producers: F. J. DeSanto; Ted Biaselli; Joerg Bachmaier; Burnie Burns; Matt Hullum; Kohei Obara
- Animator: Polygon Pictures
- Running time: 23–25 minutes
- Production companies: Rooster Teeth Studios; Polygon Pictures; Allspark Pictures (Siege); Entertainment One (Earthrise and Kingdom)

Original release
- Network: Netflix
- Release: July 30, 2020 – July 29, 2021

=== Production ===
In 2019, Hasbro's production studio, Allspark and Netflix announced a new animated series titled the War for Cybertron Trilogy. The series was produced by Rooster Teeth, alongside Allspark Animation and Polygon Pictures. F. J. DeSanto would return as showrunner while George Krstic, Gavin Hignight, and Brandon M. Easton joined as writers. The first season was originally set to be released in June 2020, but was rescheduled to July 30, 2020 due to the COVID-19 pandemic. The second season was released on December 30, 2020. The third and final season was released on July 29, 2021.

Polygon Pictures President and CEO Shuzo John Shiota said "We're thrilled to be working with Rooster Teeth, Netflix and Hasbro to bring this fan-oriented More than Meets the Eye story to life. The Transformers universe has so many rich characters and engaging stories. Getting the opportunity to be part of the team bringing the robots in disguise to life in this new trilogy is unbelievable."

Tom Warner, Senior Vice President for the Transformers franchise for Hasbro, said "The Transformers brand is a global phenomenon with toys, consumer products, films, television shows, and literature, resonating with millions of passionate fans around the world. This brand new Netflix series will add to the incredible slate of Transformers offerings with a truly unique story that will delight both existing fans and those being introduced to the wonder of robots in disguise."

Rooster Teeth co-founder and Chief Content Officer Matt Hullum said "Transformers: War for Cybertron Trilogy marks the inaugural production for our Rooster Teeth Studios division and we're proud to be partnering with and entrusted by Hasbro and Netflix. As fans of these characters, it's been a joy bringing our storytelling and animation expertise to this project. This teaser trailer is just a taste of what's to come in this series, and we can't wait to see what the fans think, especially our Rooster Teeth community!".

=== Voice Cast ===
==== Chapter 1: Siege ====
- Edward Bosco as Ultra Magnus (4 episodes), Soundwave (6 episodes)
- Jake Foushee as Optimus Prime (6 episodes)
- Todd Haberkorn as Red Alert, Shockwave (6 episodes)
- Jason Marnocha as Megatron, Dome Guard (6 episodes)
- Georgia Reed as Chromia (6 episodes)
- Bill Rogers as Wheeljack (6 episodes)
- Linsay Rousseau as Elita-1 (6 episodes)
- Keith Silverstein as Jetfire, Omega Supreme (6 episodes)
- Frank Todaro as Starscream, Refraktor, Ravage, Sparkless Bot (6 episodes)
- Mark Whitten as Sideswipe, Skywarp (6 episodes)
- Brook Chalmers as Impactor, Comms Officer, Sparkless Bot (5 episodes)
- Shawn Hawkins as Mirage (5 episodes)
- Jimmie Stafford as Hound (5 episodes)
- Rafael Goldstein as Ratchet, Soundblaster (4 episodes)
- Kaiser Johnson as Ironhide, Desperate Decepticon, Sparkless Bot (4 episodes)
- Aaron Veach as Prowl (4 episodes)
- Joe Zieja as Bumblebee (4 episodes)
- Brian Robert Burns as Cog (3 episodes)
- Alexander DiLallo as Barricade (3 episodes)
- Philip Bache as Skytread (2 episodes)
- Gray G. Haddock as Spinister (2 episodes)
- Danny Hansen as Thundercracker (2 episodes)
- Sophia Isabella/Jessica DiGiovanni as Arcee (2 episodes)
- Miles Luna as Cliffjumper, Teletraan-1 (2 episodes)
- Ellie Main as Moonracer (2 episodes)
- Ben Jurand as Alpha Trion (1 episode)

==== Chapter 2: Earthrise ====
- Kaiser Johnson as Ironhide, Seeker Guard (6 episodes)
- Jason Marnocha as Megatron (6 episodes), Galvatron (1 episode)
- Frank Todaro as Starscream, Refraktor, Shamble, Ravage (6 episodes)
- Jake Foushee as Optimus Prime (5 episodes)
- Sophia Isabella/Jessica DiGiovanni as Arcee (5 episodes)
- Bill Rogers as Wheeljack (5 episodes)
- Joe Zieja as Bumblebee (5 episodes)
- Edward Bosco as Soundwave, Ultra Magnus, Factory Worker (4 episodes)
- Todd Haberkorn as Red Alert, Shockwave (4 episodes)
- Shawn Hawkins as Mirage, Factory Worker (4 episodes)
- Georgia Reed as Chromia (4 episodes)
- Linsay Rousseau as Elita-1, Deseeus (Doubt) (4 episodes)
- Adin Rudd as Scrapface (4 episodes)
- Keith Silverstein as Jetfire, Omega Supreme, Deseeus (Death) (4 episodes)
- Mark Whitten as Sideswipe (4 episodes)
- Alexander DiLallo as Barricade (3 episodes)
- Rafael Goldstein as Ratchet, Autobot Security Officer (3 episodes)
- Michael Schwalbe as Doubledealer (3 episodes)
- Jolene Andersen as Deseeus (Wrath) (2 episodes)
- Philip Bache as Skytread (2 episodes)
- Michael Dunn as Scorponok (2 episodes)
- Danny Hansen as Thundercracker (2 episodes)
- Miles Luna as Teletraan-1 (2 episodes)
- Jimmie Stafford as Hound (2 episodes)
- Alex Taber as Bug Bite (2 episodes)
- Aaron Veach as Prowl (2 episodes)
- Sean Wright as Sky Lynx, Seeker Guard (2 episodes)
- Brian Robert Burns as Cog (1 episode)
- Gray G. Haddock as Spinister (1 episode)
- Michael Jones as Thrust (1 episode)
- Ben Jurand as Alpha Trion (1 episode)
- Jonathan Lipow as Unicron (1 episode)
- Joseph Noughton as Deseeus (Wisdom) (1 episode)
- Ken Rogers as Exhaust (1 episode)
- Jay Sanford as Dirge, Deseeus (Wit) (1 episode)

==== Chapter 3: Kingdom ====
- Marqus Bobesich as Predacon Megatron (6 episodes)
- Jeanne Carr as Blackarachnia (6 episodes)
- Erin Ebers as Airazor (6 episodes)
- Jake Foushee as Optimus Prime (6 episode), Nemesis Prime (1 episodes)
- Joe Hernandez as Cheetor (6 episodes)
- Jason Marnocha as Megatron (6 episodes), Galvatron (3 episodes)
- Justin Luther as Optimus Primal (6 episodes)
- Frank Todaro as Starscream, Rattrap, Ravage, Laserbeak (6 episodes)
- Andy Barnett as Rhinox (6 episodes)
- Sophia Isabella/Jessica DiGiovanni as Arcee (5 episodes)
- Bill Rogers as Wheeljack (5 episodes)
- Joe Zieja as Bumblebee (5 episodes)
- Edward Bosco as Soundwave, Ultra Magnus (4 episodes)
- Rafael Goldstein as Ratchet (4 episodes)
- Krizz Kaliko as Dinobot (4 episodes)
- Aaron Veach as Prowl (4 episodes)
- Kaiser Johnson as Ironhide (3 episodes)
- Jonathan Lipow as Unicron (3 episodes)
- Miles Luna as Teletraan-1 / Arkbot (3 episodes)
- Beau Marie as Tigatron (3 episodes)
- Mark Whitten as Sideswipe (3 episodes)
- Marcus Clark-Oliver as Astrotrain, Hotlink (2 episodes)
- Shawn Hawkins as Mirage (2 episodes)
- Linsay Rousseau as Elita-1 (2 episodes)
- Jimmie Stafford as Hound (2 episodes)
- Alexander Dilallo as Barricade (1 episode)
- Danny Hansen as Predacon Scorponok (1 episode)

=== Episodes ===
Season	Episodes	Subtitle	Originally released
1	6	Siege	July 30, 2020
2	6	Earthrise	December 30, 2020
3	6	Kingdom	July 29, 2021

==== Chapter 1: Siege (2020) ====
No. overall	No. in season	Title	Directed by	Written by	Original release date
1	1	"Episode 1"	Takashi Kamei	George Krstic	July 30, 2020
Megatron urges Optimus Prime to accept a treaty, while Starscream questions Jetfire's leadership. The Autobots try to recruit Bumblebee to their side.
2	2	"Episode 2"	Kazuma Shimizu	F.J. DeSanto and Gavin Hignight	July 30, 2020
Megatron receives a surprise visitor; Shockwave reveals how finding the mythical AllSpark can help defeat the Autobots. The Decepticons lay a trap.
3	3	"Episode 3"	KOJI	George Krstic	July 30, 2020
Optimus has a plan but needs Ratchet's help. Ultra Magnus is tortured for information while Starscream continues to foster dissent among the Seekers.
4	4	"Episode 4"	Kazuma Shimizu	Brandon Easton and Gavin Hignight	July 30, 2020
Elita casts doubt on Optimus' plan, which includes fixing a Spacebridge. Optimus appeals to the Guardians for help and Bumblebee receives a high honor.
5	5	"Episode 5"	KOJI	Brandon Easton and Gavin Hignight	July 30, 2020
Jetfire offers to help Optimus retrieve the AllSpark. Bumblebee, Cog and Arcee go on a mission for Energon; Wheeljack tries to get the Ark to fly.
6	6	"Episode 6"	Kazuma Shimizu	Brandon Easton and Gavin Hignight	July 30, 2020
Optimus struggles to obtain the AllSpark. Megatron figures out Optimus' plan and orders an attack on the Autobots, who receive an unexpected assist from Omega Supreme.

==== Chapter 2: Earthrise (2020) ====
No. overall	No. in season	Title	Directed by	Written by	Original release date
7	1	"Episode 1"	Takashi Kamei; KOJI	Gavin Hignight	December 30, 2020
Believing the AllSpark destroyed, Megatron plans to flee the dying planet — but at great cost. Elita's plan to free some prisoners hits a snag.
8	2	"Episode 2"	Kazuma Shimizu	Tim Sheridan	December 30, 2020
Mercenary Transformers hired by the Quintessons come upon the Ark adrift in space. As unlikely allies arrive to rescue the imprisoned Autobots, Megatron reveals Project Nemesis.
9	3	"Episode 3"	Takashi Kamei; KOJI	Gavin Hignight	December 30, 2020
The Autobots locate the AllSpark, but a deserted space station and its lone occupant stand in the way. The Decepticons catch up with the Ark.
10	4	"Episode 4"	Kazuma Shimizu	Tim Sheridan	December 30, 2020
Megatron faces a life-or-death situation. As the Autobots and Decepticons work together to fight against Scorponok, Starscream tries to seize power.
11	5	"Episode 5"	Takashi Kamei; KOJI	Gavin Hignight	December 30, 2020
Optimus encounters an unexpected guide who shows him a possible future. Megatron meets an entity who tells him what he needs to take from Optimus.
12	6	"Episode 6"	Kazuma Shimizu	Tim Sheridan	December 30, 2020
Above the planet where the AllSpark lies, the Autobots and Decepticons battle while Deseeus closes in to exact revenge upon them all.

==== Chapter 3: Kingdom (2021) ====
No. overall	No. in season	Title	Directed by	Written by	Original release date
13	1	"Episode 1"	Takashi Kamei	Mae Catt	July 29, 2021
After the crash-landing at different locations, the Autobots and the Decepticons encounter the planet's denizens and are shocked to learn who they are.
14	2	"Episode 2"	Kazuma Shimizu	Tim Sheridan	July 29, 2021
Megatron acquires an advantage in locating the Allspark. The Maximals mount a rescue when the Predacons capture one of their teammates.
15	3	"Episode 3"	Takashi Kamei	Mae Catt	July 29, 2021
As the Autobots and Decepticons close in on it, the Allspark launches a defense system that alters perception and disrupts all functionality.
16	4	"Episode 4"	Kazuma Shimizu	Tim Sheridan	July 29, 2021
Megatron's continued use of the Golden Disk to guide his actions threatens to derail Optimus Prime's attempt to obtain the Allspark.
17	5	"Episode 5"	Takashi Kamei	Mae Catt	July 29, 2021
The Autobots and the Maximals attempt to launch the Ark to return to Cybertron. They meet heavy resistance — until something extraordinary occurs.
18	6	"Episode 6"	Kazuma Shimizu	Tim Sheridan	July 29, 2021
The past, present and future collide on Cybertron as the final showdown for the Allspark begins with some unexpected participants.

=== Reception ===
On Rotten Tomatoes, the first season, Siege, has an approval rating of 95% based on reviews from 20 critics. The site's consensus is: "Visually stunning, surprisingly deep, and still a lot of fun, War for Cybertron: Siege breathes new life into the Transformers franchise." The second season, Earthrise, has an approval rating of 86% based on reviews from 7 critics. The third season, Kingdom, has an approval rating of 90% based on reviews from 10 critics. The site's consensus is: "Transporting the Autobots into a strange new world, Kingdom brings the War for Cybertron to a satisfying close with great morphing action and a delightful nod to the Beast Wars."

Fans criticized Netflix for not having the likes of Peter Cullen, Frank Welker or voice actors that were involved with the franchise previously and instead hired "non-union voice talent".
