= Nerdland =

- Theatrical release poster
- Directed by: Chris Prynoski
- Written by: Andrew Kevin Walker
- Produced by: Gavin Polone; Andrew Kevin Walker
- Starring: Paul Rudd; Patton Oswalt; Hannibal Buress; Kate Micucci; Riki Lindhome; John Ennis; Mike Judge
- Edited by: Mark Brooks; Barry J. Kelly
- Music by: Mark Brooks; Emily Kavanaugh
- Production companies: Titmouse, Inc. Pariah; AKW Worldwide
- Distributed by: Samuel Goldwyn Films
- Release dates: April 14, 2016 (Tribeca Film Festival); December 6, 2016 (United States)
- Running time: 83 minutes
- Country: United States
- Language: English

Nerdland is a 2016 American adult animated comedy film directed by Chris Prynoski and written by Andrew Kevin Walker. The film stars Paul Rudd, Patton Oswalt, Hannibal Buress, Kate Micucci, Riki Lindhome, John Ennis and Mike Judge. The film received a one night only special screening on December 6, 2016, before being released on video on demand by Samuel Goldwyn Films on January 6, 2017, and on DVD and Blu-ray on February 7, 2017, by Sony Pictures Home Entertainment.

== Plot ==
The story of two best friends, aspiring screenwriter Elliot (Patton Oswalt), and aspiring actor John (Paul Rudd), who was kicked out of acting school, whose dreams of super-stardom have fizzled and have both been fired from every kind of job they have ever done. After John's disastrous interview with celebrity Brett Anderson (Reid Scott), he and Elliot make a pact to become famous before their 30th birthday in 24 hours. In their first attempt at doing this they get beat up by a homeless man named Archie (Mike Judge) after trying to get a check back from him upon finding the camera only filmed their feet: in their second attempt they get rescued from a fire trying to rescue an old woman from it, with the same woman ending up rescuing Elliot from it. After an interview is denied, John concludes that it's not fame they want, its infamy.

Elliot and John attempt to hack a company using the names "deadly jester" and "fist of satan" but the owner, Marvin Masterson (Paul Scheer), retaliates by using his "reverse-screw-driver" to delete all of John's pornography and melt Elliot and John's computer. John later decides to go on a killing spree in order to get more attention. Elliot is reluctant to help John with this, but eventually decides to do it, saying to him that he can't do it alone. They buy chloroform to use to kill their elderly neighbor, but John has second thoughts. Elliot and John then discover that while in disguise, during one of their previous attempts at fame, they became witnesses to a robbery and are now being called the "mystery witnesses". The two go on TV to tell everyone they are the "mystery witnesses", and quickly become a full media sensation with the help of Sally and Linda (Kate Micucci and Riki Lindhome), two girls who work at a mall and with whom the boys flirt. However, when brought to the police station soon after, they are informed by Detective Donahue (John Ennis) that the man who had committed the robbery and was arrested is actually a relative of the member of a Cleveland crime syndicate. As such, the two are now being forced to go to the witness protection program to make sure that his family members won't find and kill them. Desperate not to throw their life away, the two run away from the station and hide out in Sally and Linda's apartment and come up with an idea to kill the mystery witnesses.

Elliot and John go to the Nerd King (Hannibal Buress), the overweight owner of a collectible store and a trade partner for tools they had used in their failed fame attempts, and using a rare collectible action figure, are able to get help from him to fake the deaths of the "mystery witnesses". After it is done, the two return to Sally and Linda's apartment to find it filled with the press, resulting in them getting arrested for running away live on television, during which they ask Sally and Linda if they would like to join them in the witness protection program, but are left with only being allowed for the four to exchange their goodbyes. In the end, John and Elliot are seen working at a diner while wearing fake mustaches. They smile knowing they have finally gotten what they wanted: fame.

== Voice cast ==
- Paul Rudd as John
- Patton Oswalt as Elliot
- Hannibal Buress as The King
- Kate Micucci as Sally
- Riki Lindhome as Linda
- John Ennis as Detective Donahue
- Mike Judge as Archie
- Reid Scott as Brett Anderson
- Laraine Newman as Old Woman
- Paul Scheer as Marvin Masterson
- Julie Galdieri as Cathy
- Bob Stephenson as Friendly Cop
- Brendon Small as Mr. Kelly
- Laura Silverman as Female Police Officer
- Cree Summer as Reporter Sassy
- Molly Shannon as Business Woman
- Tommy Blacha as Pharmacist
- Dave Willis as Timmy
- Lo Mutuc (Note: Credited as Charlyne Yi) as Becky
- Dana Snyder as Confused Guy #2

== Production ==
Nerdland is based on a concept that screenwriter Andrew Kevin Walker had been pitching for several years in various iterations: first as a live-action movie, then a television series, then a series of animated shorts, and finally an animated film. Walker explains, "I have been a huge fan of Metalocalypse, Superjail!, and a lot of the cartoons that are on Adult Swim, especially the stuff done by Titmouse, Inc. I would watch Metalocalypse and the little bird logo would come up at the end and chirp and I’d think, 'Who are these lunatics?' We set up a meeting with Titmouse and gave them the script. I was expecting Chris and Shannon Prynoski, who created and run Titmouse, to just say, 'No, this is a stupid idea.' But they said yes, and we went from there. I was super excited that Chris was interested in overseeing the making of it as a feature. Once he said yes he also said yes to directing it, which was great because I’m a huge fan of his."

== Release ==
The film premiered at the Tribeca Film Festival on April 14, 2016. On September 29, 2016, Samuel Goldwyn Films acquired distribution rights to the film. The film received a one night only special screening on December 6, 2016, before being released on video on demand on January 6, 2017, by Samuel Goldwyn Films and on DVD and Blu-ray on February 7, 2017, by Sony Pictures Home Entertainment.

== Reception ==
On Rotten Tomatoes, the film has a 21% rating with an average rating of 4.03/10, based on 14 reviews. Metacritic, which uses a weighted average, assigned the film a score of 46 out of 100, based on 5 critics, indicating "mixed or average" reviews.
