= Home: Adventures with Tip & Oh =

American animated television series

- Genre: Science-fiction; Comedy
- Based on: Characters created by Adam Rex
- Developed by: Ryan Crego; Thurop Van Orman
- Voices of: Rachel Crow; Mark Whitten; Ana Ortiz; Ron Funches; Matt Jones; Nolan North
- Theme music composer: Alex Geringas; Rachel Crow; Will Fuller; Michael Himelstein
- Composer: Alex Geringas
- Country of origin: United States
- No. of seasons: 4
- No. of episodes: 52 (+ 1 special) (list of episodes)

Production
- Executive producers: Ryan Crego; Thurop Van Orman (S1)
- Running time: 23 minutes
- Production companies: DreamWorks Animation Television; Titmouse, Inc.

Original release
- Network: Netflix
- Release: July 29, 2016 – July 20, 2018

Home: Adventures with Tip & Oh is an American 2D animated television series produced by DreamWorks Animation and animated by Titmouse, which debuted on July 29, 2016, as a Netflix original series. It was developed by Ryan Crego and Thurop Van Orman. The series is a sequel to the 2015 film Home, which in turn was based on the 2007 novel The True Meaning of Smekday by Adam Rex. Aside from Matt Jones reprising his role as the voice of Kyle, none of the original cast reprised their roles.

The second season was released on January 27, 2017. A holiday special called Home for the Holidays was released on December 1, 2017. The fourth and final season was released on July 20, 2018.

The series began airing on Universal Kids in March 2019 until it was dropped in 2021, and then on March 1, August 8, and December 24 and 25, 2022.

The series was removed from Netflix in April 2024 due to licensing agreements. As of March 2026, the show is now streaming on Kidoodle.TV along with various other shows from DreamWorks Animation Television.

== Plot ==
The animated series takes place after the events of the film Home, in the setting of Earth's newly combined human and alien culture. The title characters, a fearless human girl (Tip) and an overenthusiastic alien Boov (Oh), build upon their established friendship and find adventure while navigating the crazily combined world they now share.

The series includes pop songs performed by artist Rachel Crow as Tip.

== Episodes ==
A 1-hour Christmas special called Home: For the Holidays was released on December 1, 2017.

Season	Segments	Episodes	Originally released
1	26	13	July 29, 2016
2	26	13	January 27, 2017
3	25	13	August 11, 2017
Special			December 1, 2017
4	26	13	July 20, 2018

== Cast ==
=== Main ===
- Rachel Crow as Tip Tucci
- Mark Whitten as Oh, Garfeldt
- Ana Ortiz as Lucy Tucci
- Ryan Crego as Pig
- Matt Jones as Kyle
- Nolan North as Smek, Donny
- Ron Funches as Sharzod
- Kelly Donohue as Pom Pom Pappernacky
- Nika Futterman as Slushious

=== Guest cast ===
- Cheri Oteri as Pauline
- Abby Elliott as Chelsea
- Eric Edelstein as Max
- Jon Heder as Julio, the assistant store manager
- Cristela Alonzo as Linda Tucci, Lucy's sister
- Wayne Knight as Boovius
- Beth Behrs as Moochie
- Atticus Shaffer as Fox
- Marcus Scribner as Smudge
- Cher as Chercophonie
- Casey Zwicker as Elrod
- Melany Ochoa as Young Lucy
- Ashlyn Faith Williams as Young Linda
- Jack McBrayer as Byool, Wowsers
- Dayci Brookshire as Apple
- Michael Johnston as Keanu
- Cheryl Hines as Agnes
- Margaret Cho as Georgia
- Oscar Nuñez as Milton
- Dawnn Lewis as Bobe
- Reid Scott as Shawn/Hodag
- Dove Cameron as Bonnie
- Da'Vine Joy Randolph as Crushtina
- Grey DeLisle as Die-Anne
