= George Krstic =

American film producer

- Occupations: Director, screenwriter, producer, story editor

George Krstic is an American director, screenwriter and producer known for his work in the science fiction, comic book and animation genres. Story editor on the Emmy-Nominated Downtown and Co-Creator of Megas XLR, Krstic recently served as a writer on George Lucas' television series Star Wars: The Clone Wars as well as the scrapped Gonzo production of Gonin - The Five Killers, along with Kingdom Come scribe Mark Waid and Afro Samurai producer Eric Calderon.

== Awards ==
- Grand Prize, Golden Eagle - CINE Film Festival
- Eagle - CINE Film Festival
- First Place - Moomba International Film Festival
- Silver Seal - Manchester International Film Festival
- Three Stars - Canadian International Annual Film & Video Festival
- Finalist - Worldfest Charleston International Film Festival
- Finalist - New York International Non-Broadcast Festival
- Special Mention - Cork International Youth Film & Video Festival
- Special Mention - BRNO-16 International Film Festival
- Honorable Mention - American International Film & Video Festival
- Honorable Mention - Ebensee International Film Festival
- Honorable Mention - International Juvenale Festival

== Nominations ==
- Primetime Emmy Award for MTV Downtown (2000)
- Saturn Award for Star Wars: The Clone Wars (2009)
- Annie Award for Motorcity (2012)
- Annie Award for Motorcity (2013)

== Filmography ==
=== Director ===
- The Last Actor (1994)
- Lowbrow (2003)
- Megas XLR (2004)
- Dark Vault (in development)

=== Producer ===
- The Last Actor (1994)
- Lowbrow (2003)
- Megas XLR (2004–2005)
- Orion (in development)
- Dark Vault (in development)
- Gonin - The Five Killers (in development)

=== Writer ===
- The Last Actor (1994)
- MTV Downtown (1999): story editor
- Lowbrow (2003)
- Megas XLR (2004–2005): story editor
- Star Wars: The Clone Wars (2008–2009)
- Cartoon Network Universe: FusionFall (2009 video game)
- League of Legends (2009 video game)
- Motorcity (2012–2013)
- Max Steel (2013)
- Transformers: Combiner Wars (2016)
- Transformers: War for Cybertron Trilogy (2020)
- Orion (in development)
- Dark Vault (in development)
- Gonin - The Five Killers (in development): story editor
- Versus (a.k.a. Versus 2 or The American Versus) (in development)

== Bibliography ==
=== Writer ===
- Axcess Magazine (Axcess Publishing, 1995–1997)
- Jam Packed Action #1 (DC Comics, 2005)
- Action Pack #1 (DC Comics, July 2006)
- Action Pack #4 (DC Comics, October 2006)
- Action Pack #5 (DC Comics, November 2006)
- Action Pack #9 (DC Comics, March 2007)
- Action Pack #11 (DC Comics, May 2007)
- Cartoon Network Universe: FusionFall Worlds Collide (CN Comics, July 2007)

=== Editor ===
- Axcess Magazine (Axcess Publishing, 1995–1997)
