= Downtown (1999 TV series) =

1999 American animated sitcom

- Genre: Animated sitcom
- Created by: Chris Prynoski
- Voices of: Gregory Gilmore; Leyora Zuberman; Marco H. Rodriguez; Scot Rienecker; Tammy Lang; Hector Fontanez; Aurora Lucia-Levey; Phoebe Summersquash
- Composer: Kimson Albert
- Country of origin: United States
- Original language: English
- No. of seasons: 1
- No. of episodes: 13

Production
- Executive producer: Abby Terkuhle
- Producer: David McGrath
- Editor: Matt Miller
- Running time: 22 minutes
- Production company: MTV Animation

Original release
- Network: MTV
- Release: August 3 – November 8, 1999

Downtown, also known as MTV Downtown, is an American animated sitcom created by Chris Prynoski that aired on MTV from August 3 to November 8, 1999. The show follows a group of young adults who live in an urban area on East Village of New York City, presenting their everyday lives.

Inspired by Ralph Bakshi's films from the early 1970s, Prynoski in the mid-1990s felt that his films from its time were a time capsule of a culture. He began work on Downtown, for the same effect of what he felt watching about Bakshi's films of the period time, as Downtown years later.

MTV canceled the series after one season. Prynoski put bad marketing decisions and the rerun's inconvenient time slots as speculations for the cause. Nonetheless, the sitcom's episode "Before and After" was nominated for a Primetime Emmy Award for Outstanding Animated Program in 2000, and the series has been positively received by critics and audiences in retrospect.

== Plot ==
The show follows a diverse and multiracial group of young adults who live in an urban area on East Village of New York City, and presents their everyday lives. The series is based on interviews with real people.

== Characters ==
The main characters of Downtown

- Alex Henson (voiced by Gregory Gilmore) is a nerdy 24-year-old and Chaka's older brother. He harbors a crush on goth girl Serena. Alex lives in Lower East Side apartment.
- Chaka Henson (voiced by Leyora Zuberman) is Alex's rebellious 17-year-old younger sister.
- Fruity (voiced by Marco H. Rodriguez) is an Afro-Latino ladies' man who has a crush on Chaka.
- Scott "Goat" (voiced by Scot Rienecker) is Alex and Jen's stoner friend.
- Jen (voiced by Tammy Lang) is Alex's chubby, sarcastic Asian-American best friend. She runs a used-clothing shop, with a minimum-wage.
- Matt (voiced by Hector Fontanez) is Fruity's artsy best friend, who sprays Grafiti under the name "Minus".
- Mecca (voiced by Aurora Lucia-Levey) is an African-American hopeless romantic and Chaka's best friend.
- Serena (voiced by Phoebe Summersquash) is a resident goth girl, and Alex's love interest.
- Leah (voiced by Rosanna Plasencia) is Jen's promiscuous roommate.
- Lizzie (voiced by Christina Campanella) is a raver girl who Chaka and Mecca mock behind her back.

Additional voice actors include: Cheese Hasselberger, Kirk Randolf, Mike de Seve, Eric S. Calderon, Guy Maxtone-Graham, Trish Ward-Torres, Paul Williams, David Toney, Joseph Buoye, Jay Daniels.

== Episodes ==
No.	Title	Directed by	Written by	Original release date
1	"Sin Bin"	Tony Kluck	Anne D. Bernstein	August 3, 1999
Alex moves into his own apartment, with the help of his friends Jen, Goat, Chaka and Mecca. Selling some of his old action figures, Alex meets his newest infatuation, goth girl Serena, at a comic book store called Starbase 12. Chaka and Mecca, tasked with watching the van, are distracted by boys and the moving van is stolen.
2	"Train Pain"	Ilya Skorupsky	David Regal	August 10, 1999
Chaka and Mecca challenge Fruity and Matt to a battle-of-the-sexes subway race to Coney Island, to determine which subway line goes there the fastest. Meanwhile, Alex and Jen play board games, leading to a big blowup.
3	"Hot Spot"	Kevin Lofton	Rachelle Romberg	August 17, 1999
The dive bar on the ground floor of Alex's building is replaced by "Flame", a trendy new club. Chaka and her friends, all underage, sneak into the club to party. The party continues in Alex's apartment, and Alex and Jen try to retaliate against the club.
4	"Insomnia"	Eugene Salandra	Japhet Asher and Peter Gaffney	August 24, 1999
Alex is set up on a date with Serena, and suffers insomnia from his pre-date anxiety. Wandering around the city streets late at night, he starts hallucinating from lack of sleep, leading to an unexpected encounter with Serena.
5	"The Con"	Tony Kluck	Erica Rothschild	August 31, 1999
Alex is concerned that his nerdy obsessions with toy collecting and comic book hoarding will drive his dream girl away. At a Horror Convention with his friends, Alex is torn between trying to impress Serena and acquiring a rare action figure to complete his "White Trash" fantasy collection. World Wrestling Federation (WWF) pro-wrestler, The Undertaker, makes a special guest appearance.
6	"Graffiti"	Kevin Lofton	Erica Rothschild	September 7, 1999
Matt goes out for a night of painting graffiti in the subway tunnels with Fruity and Chaka, and finds the city's underground Hall of Fame for graffiti artists. Meanwhile, Alex has a sexually-charged night with Leah, Jen's promiscuous roommate.
7	"Hotel Bar"	Eugene Salandra	Eric Friedman	September 14, 1999
Goat takes Alex out for a night of picking up girls, and encourages him to lower his standards, leading to a rough night for both of them. Meanwhile, Jen and Leah have an unfortunate night out as well, as Leah tries to pick up a rich guy. Rev Jen Miller provides the voice of Teeny.
8	"Limo"	Tony Kluck	Anne D. Bernstein	September 28, 1999
Worried that she hasn't had a date in a long time, Jen impulsively rents a stretch limo for the night, and takes Alex along for the ride. Fruity, Matt, Chaka and Mecca are accosted by a group of tough Catholic school girls in Chinatown.
9	"Testing"	Pat Smith	Peter Elwell	October 5, 1999
Alex, Chaka, Fruity and Goat take part in a research study about how much they remember their education. Alex tests well, and wonders if he should be more ambitious. Meanwhile, Goat is becoming increasingly unstable and paranoid, but is calmed down by a meeting with an old high school classmate.
10	"Night Shift"	Eugene Salandra	George Krstic	October 18, 1999
Jen is upset by Serena's effect on Alex and their other nerdy friends, and starts investigating her. Meanwhile, Alex has a hard time working at the copy shop.
11	"Before and After"	Tony Kluck	Eric Friedman	October 25, 1999
Chaka accuses Mecca of copying her style. Jen forces Alex to clean his house, and throw out his toy collection.
12	"Cropsey Clanners"	Pat Smith	David Regal	November 1, 1999
Jen and Alex go collectible-hunting in the New Jersey suburbs, with Chaka and Mecca along for the ride. When the car breaks down, the four share urban legends about rural New Jersey, leading to a freak out.
13	"Trip Or Treat"	Eugene Salandra	Rachelle Romberg	November 8, 1999
Alex finally gets the nerve to ask Serena out to a Halloween party while taking pictures of her in a graveyard for her website 'SerenaLand'. Later, we discover Serena is branching out from the 'goth' look, expanding her wardrobe in hopes of expanding the range of men attracted to her, and how people perceive her. Alex unfortunately does not respond well to this change, as he realizes he may have only been attracted to her due to her "dangerous, exotic look" and plans to ditch her before the Halloween party, an idea accompanied by Jen, yet it is Goat who talks some sense into him in his own morally ambiguous way.Meanwhile, Chaka decides to face her fear of trick-or-treating head-on, stemming from her history with her childhood Halloween bully, she herself turning into what she feared the most, stealing a child's bag of candy and sharing it with her friends. She later finds out a piece of candy she consumed is laced with "something nasty" as she begins hallucinating and runs from the safety of her friends in a drug-induced panic.All the while, Alex calls Serena to talk to her about the parade, running to the comic store 'StarBase 12' to see if she is still there, only to find she just headed out to the parade on her own. Alex runs to the parade but is stopped by a frantic Mecca, Fruity and Matt, all asking him to help them track down Chaka. After some time they end up finding her amongst the crowd running from what she thought was a giant bunny with its head torn off and towards a dragon surrounded by what she thinks is dancing flowers, but what is actually an unstable parade float. She climbs onto the head of the structure as it begins to break at its base. Alex sees this and climbs the head as well attempting to rescue her.The head breaks as Alex throws Chaka off and to safety and he himself falls off the head and onto his own. He gets up and checks if Chaka is ok who is only now coming down from the high and stops hallucinating, thanking her brother as he gives her his coat and runs off to find Serena. After finally finding her, he sees she is back to her old self ("What can I say, I missed wearing black" - Serena) and begins to apologize and confess his feelings right before she friend zones him and goes off with an odd man with an even more odd accent.

== Production ==
According to Chris Prynoski, when he watched early-1970s Ralph Bakshi films in the mid-1990s, he felt that his films from that time were "much like a time capsule." This inspired him to create Downtown, "so that when people watch the show 20 years later, it feels exactly like 1999 in New York". Prynoski also wanted to show "a line of demarcation where society changed completely" before cell phones and he "wanted to be able to have nostalgia for what doesn't exist now."

The soundtrack of Downtown was composed by Massive Attack and DJ Shadow. Music tracks involving drum-and-bass were composed by Kimson Albert.

== Release ==
Downtown was first shown at the National Association of Television Program Executives (NATPE), in January 1999. It was later shown during Comic-Con International in August of that year. The show was broadcast for 13 episodes, airing from August 3, to November 8, 1999. Video clips of episodes were also available on its official website. Prynoski himself was unsure why the show was canceled after one season, but fans speculated that bad marketing decisions and inconvenient time slots for its reruns caused the cancellation from MTV.

Due to licensing issues with the music, the series was never officially released on DVD or in any physical form. It was not released on any streaming service or VOD. It also had limited merchandise, which the series staff sold their own versions. All 13 episodes of the show, sometime later, were unofficially released on YouTube. A collection of merch of the show was also released by Prynoski and Titmouse Inc.. In 2024, for the celebration of the show's 25th anniversary, as it also was never officially released by MTV.

== Reception ==
While Downtown did receive a lackluster interest during its release, aside from being nominated for a Primetime Emmy Award for Outstanding Animated Program for the episode "Before and After" in 2000. During COVID-19 pandemic in 2020, the show gained larger interest from the audience in retrospect online, on YouTube and TikTok. The show was ranked fourth out of ten places on IMDb for becoming one of the best-rated animated series on MTV by July 2021, scoring 8.0 out of 10, with users praising and citing the show for "its abstract imagery and realism."

=== Critical reception ===
In retrospect the show was positively received by critics. Sarah Nechamkin of Interview called Downtown "The best piece of discarded treasure to come out of the glorious trove of '90s MTV". Greta Rainbow of Vulture, called it a "Feat of naturalistic dialogue", describing the series as a "hyperspecific time capsule". Brad LaCour of Collider, expressed that "The writing of Downtown is sharp and natural, finding its humor naturally within conversations without making detours for jokes. The voice acting is superb and naturalistic, like you’re overhearing a conversation and not watching a produced script."
