= Motorcity (TV series) =

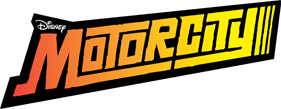
- Genre: Action; Science fiction
- Created by: Chris Prynoski
- Developed by: David Bickel
- Directed by: Chris Prynoski; Juno Lee
- Voices of: Reid Scott; Nate Torrence; Kate Micucci; Kel Mitchell; Jess Harnell; Brian Doyle-Murray; Jim Breuer; Mark Hamill
- Theme music composer: Brendon Small
- Composer: Stephen Barton
- Country of origin: United States
- Original language: English
- No. of seasons: 1
- No. of episodes: 20

Production
- Executive producer: Chris Prynoski
- Producer: Ben Kalina
- Running time: 22 minutes
- Production companies: Titmouse, Inc.; Robin Red Breast, Inc.; Disney Television Animation

Original release
- Network: Disney XD
- Release: April 30, 2012 – January 7, 2013

Motorcity is an American animated television series created by Chris Prynoski and produced by Prynoski's studio Titmouse, Inc., Robin Red Breast, Inc. and Disney Television Animation. The show is set in a futuristic version of Detroit named Detroit Deluxe, owned by the evil billionaire Abraham Kane. Below the city lies a group of rebels calling themselves the Burners, led by Mike Chilton, who aspire to protect their underground home and safe haven, the titular Motorcity, from Kane's tyranny.

Motorcity premiered on Disney XD on April 30, 2012, and concluded on January 7, 2013 to positive reception. As revealed by Prynoski, the series was not renewed for a second season. Motorcity was Prynoski's first co-production with Disney; he would later co-produce other projects with the company, including Randy Cunningham: 9th Grade Ninja, Kiff, and StuGo.

== Synopsis ==
Motorcity occurs in a fictional futuristic version of Detroit, which is an elevated metropolis built over the old Detroit, called Detroit Deluxe. It is owned by evil billionaire Abraham Kane (Mark Hamill). Ruling the citizens under strict laws, and banning personal freedoms including automobile transportation, Kane now faces one last obstacle: a band of hot-rod wielding rebels who call themselves the Burners. Led by Kane's former cadet Mike Chilton (Reid Scott), the Burners rise to stop Kane from conquering Detroit's last oasis of freedom—an underground refuge dubbed Motorcity.

== Characters ==
=== Protagonists ===
==== The Burners ====
The main protagonists of the series. They are a ragtag group of rebels who, with the help of their modified cars, thwart the evil Abraham Kane's schemes to conquer Motorcity.

- Mike Chilton (voiced by Reid Scott) is the former cadet of Kane, leader of the Burners, and the main protagonist of the series. He is a quick-witted, reckless but well-meaning individual who takes almost nothing seriously, except for the well-being of his team and his mission of taking down Kane. A natural-born leader, he often manages to lead his Burners to victory and fight for what they stand for.
- Chuck (voiced by Nate Torrence) is Mike's co-pilot and best friend. He's the Burners' computer expert, and thanks to his big brain, always manages to help his friends despite his cowardly nature. He is the only Burner who is unable to drive, and fears rejection from the others if they ever found out.
- Julie (voiced by Kate Micucci) is the Burners' infiltration expert and inside connection to KaneCo., who disguises herself as an intern for the company and leads a double life. Unbeknownst to her fellow Burners, she is actually Kane's daughter, but she has no reason to fear, considering she's just as willing to fight back against her father's tyranny as they are.
- Dutch Gordy (voiced by Kel Mitchell) is the Burners' creative technological genius. A graffiti artist at heart, he initially came to Motorcity to escape Kane's iron fist and was originally quite aloof, but his dedication and loyalty makes him a steadfast teammate. He also has a crush on his friend Tennie, who she ends up dating.
  - R.O.T.H. is Dutch's robot assistant. He was one of Kane's attack droids until Dutch reprogrammed him. He is afraid of metal-eating robot mites but has no reason to be afraid since all of Kane's technology is made from synthetic polymers. Texas often mispronounces his name, calling him "Ralph".
- Texas (voiced by Jess Harnell) is a violent, gung-ho and imaginative powder keg who is dedicated to the Burners, and whose fierce determination usually makes him the first one on the battlefield when a fight breaks out. He wishes to one day lead the Burners but never questions Mike's authority without a reason.
- Jacob (voiced by Brian Doyle-Murray) is a hippie biker in his mid-sixties who often acts as a mentor to the Burners and Kane's former partner before Kane became obsessed with control, with lots of useful scientific and technological knowledge that is often buried under organic food talk.

=== Supporting ===
These are the allies of the Burners.

- Claire, (voiced by Dana Davis) is a stereotypical valley girl, and Julie's best friend and confidant for her dual identities despite being uncomfortable in the subterranean slums of Motorcity.
- Dr. Hudson (voiced by Jim Cummings) is a scientist who was Jacob's student when KaneCo was (quoted by Jacob); "trying to help people, not exploit them". He was forced to make a supercharged power cell that threatened to annihilate Motorcity.
- Rayon (voiced by Bumper Robinson) is the leader of a gang called the Skylarks, the owner of the Skylark Motel, and a regular client of the Burners.
- Darr Gordy (voiced by Roshon Fegan) is Dutch's brother and former cadet to Kane when Dutch left Deluxe for Motorcity.
- Tennie (voiced by Aimee Garcia) is an engineer and love interest of Dutch. She, her father Bracket, and the Burners worked together to defend her home, the Cablers' Settlement, against Kane's bots.
- Bracket (voiced by Carlos Alazraqui) is Tennie's father, who initially disapproves of Dutch until the end of the episode "Mayhem Night".
- Foxy (voiced by Jennifer Hale) is the leader of the Amazons, an entirely female gang in Motorcity that specializes in fast, high-tech vehicles.

=== Villains ===
- Abraham "Abe" Kane (voiced by Mark Hamill) is the billionaire owner of Detroit Deluxe and serves as the main antagonist of the series. Kane is a wicked, megalomaniac industrialist who was responsible for building the new Detroit, called Detroit Deluxe, atop the old one, now named Motorcity, and plans to spread his empire by wiping out the Motorcitizen population.He is a ruthless individual, though he cares deeply for his daughter Julie, and it's implied his desire to conquer Motorcity stems from a desire to control.
  - Tooley (voiced by Jim Breuer) is Kane's loyal, but incredibly stupid right-hand man.
- Kaia (voiced by Laraine Newman) is the leader of an eco-terrorist resistance group called the Terra Dwellers, who live in a village outside Detroit that was destroyed by KaneCo's waste dumping, and now use the mutated wildlife to fight back against Kane, as well as the entire Deluxeian population, whether or not good or bad. The group were originally allies of the Burners over their united hatred towards Kane before learning of their crueler nature and harsher, more chaotic methods.
- The Duke of Detroit (voiced by Dee Snider) is a flamboyant, self-absorbed collector and lover of cars who owns a palace filled with guards and mint condition automobiles. Despite his eccentric personality, he is someone not to be ever messed with, as during the Burner's first time meeting him, he put a bounty on their heads that made them targets for every gang in Motorcity. However, he begins to demonstrate becoming an unlikely ally/frenemy relationship with the Burners.
  - #2 (voiced by Tara Strong) is a devoted assistant of Duke. She is often seen blowing bubblegum.
  - Cyborg Dan (voiced by Dave Wittenberg) is a robot who works for the Duke. He later harbors an irrational hatred of Mike Chilton in "The Duke of Detroit Presents" after being having his face melted by toxic waste, though nobody takes him seriously.
- Red (voiced by Eric Ladin) is a ghost from Mike's past who was indirectly responsible for Mike coming to Motorcity, where he became homeless after Mike's former KaneCo. cadets destroyed his home, which was full of people (even though Mike got everyone out in time) and had trained to get his revenge, even forming an alliance with Kane himself just to see Mike suffer.

== Episodes ==
No.	Title	Directed by	Written by	Storyboarded by	Original release date	Prod. code	U.S. viewers (millions)
1	"Battle for Motorcity"	Chris Prynoski	Story by : Chris Prynoski & Craig Lewis; Teleplay by : Chris Prynoski	Paul Harmon, Ed Tadem, Andy Suriano and Jamie Vickers	April 30, 2012	MC101	0.48
Kane tries to cripple Motorcity, and when his attack on the Eastside gate fails, he lures the Burners into a trap to destroy Motorcity. Note: The first episode was available for free on iTunes.
2	"Power Trip"	Juno Lee	Story by : Madison Bateman & George Krstic; Teleplay by : George Krstic	Sung Jin Ahn, Anthony Chun and Jae Woo Kim	May 7, 2012	MC102	0.41
When the Burners get a distress call from Kane Co., they rescue a scientist who had developed a power cell strong enough to wipe out all of Detroit.
3	"Ride the Lightning"	Chris Prynoski	John O'Bryan	Andy Suriano, Ed Tadem and Jamie Vickers	May 14, 2012	MC103	0.25
Kane uses a robot known as the "Climator" to cause a huge blizzard in Motorcity, and Mike goes missing. Julie, Dutch, and Texas must put aside their differences to find Mike.
4	"Texas-ify It!"	Chris Prynoski	Story by : John O'Bryan, Craig Lewis, & Darrick Bachman; Teleplay by : John O'Bryan	Andy Suriano, Ed Tadem and Jamie Vickers	May 21, 2012	MC105	0.3
The Burners team up with another resistance group called the Terra, whose home has been turned into a toxic waste dump by Kane Co. Texas, who has been feeling unappreciated, becomes very popular with their new allies. The Burners soon discover that their new allies are hiding some dangerous secrets.
5	"The Duke of Detroit"	Juno Lee	Darrick Bachman	Sung Jin Ahn, David Woo, Anthony Chun and James Yang	June 7, 2012	MC104	0.2
An incident with Kane's robots causes Mike to become overly protective of his friends, and the Burners are separated. Mike, Chuck, and Julie come across Motorcity's "Duke of Detroit," who is at odds with Mike due to his disrespectful nature. This leads to negative repercussions as the Duke places a bounty on the Burners' heads, and rebel groups in Motorcity want to claim it.
6	"Vendetta"	Juno Lee	John O'Bryan	Sung Jin Ahn, Eugene Lee and David Woo	June 14, 2012	MC110	0.4
Kane celebrates Mike's one-year anniversary as a Motorcitizen by sending a swarm of metal-eating robot mites to destroy Motorcity. As the Burners try to stop Kane's latest attack, they are sabotaged by a mysterious masked villain with ties to Mike's checkered past with Kane.
7	"Blond Thunder"	Chris Prynoski	Story by : Craig Lewis; Teleplay by : Greg Ernstrom	Andy Suriano, Ed Tadem and Jamie Vickers	June 21, 2012	MC107	0.3
Chuck has been building his own car for a while, but is still missing a part. When Mike gets it from the Duke of Detroit's territory, the two propose a wager - Chuck against the Duke's best drivers, with Mutt being the grand prize. Chuck reveals to Mike he doesn't know how to drive, so to help his friend, Mike decides to give Chuck a crash course in driving.
8	"Going Dutch"	Chris Prynoski	George Krstic	Andy Suriano, Ed Tadem and Jamie Vickers	June 28, 2012	MC109	0.3
Dutch has had enough of The Burners monopolizing his time with car maintenance and goes off to work on his other passion, art. When Kane releases a terrible virus that turns everyone, including the Burners, into mindless zombies, Dutch must use his wits and imagination to save the day.
9	"Ride of the Fantasy Vans"	Chris Prynoski	Story by : George Krstic; Teleplay by : Greg Ernstrom	Tyree Dillihay, Andy Suriano and Ed Tadem	July 5, 2012	MC111	0.3
When two of Chuck's friends from his Live Action Role Play (LARP) world go missing, the group turns to The Burners for help. The Burners are in for a huge surprise when they find themselves facing off against Utilitons, evil robots that both they and Kane fear.
10	"The Duke of Detroit Presents..."	Juno Lee	Darrick Bachman	Sung Jin Ahn, Eugene Lee and David Woo	July 12, 2012	MC112	0.3
After a few weeks of harmony in Motorcity, Mike jumps at the chance to bring a container of hazardous waste back to the refinery. Once on the road, the Burners discover that the job is all part of the Duke of Detroit's dangerous new reality show, with them trapped as the main stars.
11	"Off the Rack"	Juno Lee	George Krstic	Sung Jin Ahn, Anthony Chun and David Woo	July 19, 2012	MC106	0.3
When Julie's loyalty to the Burners is questioned, she decides to prove herself by using a KaneCo Safe-T-Suit to pull off a dangerous mission alone. What she doesn't realize is that Kane has the power to control the person inside each Safe-T-Suit, which he takes full advantage of by turning her against her own teammates.
12	"Fearless"	Juno Lee	Story by : Adam Beechen & John O'Bryan; Teleplay by : Adam Beechen & Greg Ernstrom	Sung Jin Ahn, Eugene Lee and David Woo	October 19, 2012	MC108	0.2
When Kane develops a booster that increases physical abilities and eliminates fear, Chuck tries it and things start to get weird. Note: This episode was previously scheduled to air on June 14, 2012. It was also leaked onto iTunes and quickly removed. It officially aired in the US by Friday, October 19, 2012. This episode aired in the UK on Saturday, August 18, 2012.
13	"Mayhem Night"	Chris Prynoski	Story by : George Krstic; Teleplay by : John O'Bryan	Andy Suriano, Ed Tadem and Jamie Vickers	October 26, 2012	MC118	0.2
It's Halloween in Motorcity and Dutch has planned a get together with Tennie, Chuck and Claire. Yet, when the Terra Dwellers ambush The Burners with a special gas, the team is forced to face their biggest fears while preventing the Terras from destroying the foundation of Detroit Deluxe.
14	"Like Father, Like Daughter"	Juno Lee	John O'Bryan	Sung Jin Ahn, Eugene Lee and David Woo	November 2, 2012	MC114	0.3
When Kane steals a treasure trove of vintage cars from right under the Burners' noses, Julie must use her daughterly charm to distract Kane as her teammates attempt to get the cars back. However, things don't go as planned when an unexpected visitor returns to settle a personal vendetta against the team.
15	"Reunion"	Chris Prynoski	George Krstic	Andy Suriano, Ed Tadem and Jamie Vickers	December 3, 2012	MC113	N/A
After a Burner mission goes awry, Dutch is forced to hideout in Detroit Deluxe, where he has an unexpected reunion with his parents.
16	"Julie and the Amazons"	Chris Prynoski	Greg Ernstrom	Andy Suriano, Ed Tadem and Jamie Vickers	December 10, 2012	MC115	N/A
After Burner-logoed cars infiltrate Motorcity, the Burners must prove their innocence in 24 hours or face the Duke of Detroit's wrath.
17	"The Robo-Roundup"	Juno Lee	Darrick Bachman	Sung Jin Ahn, Eugene Lee and David Woo	December 17, 2012	MC116	N/A
Texas unwillingly enters Mama's Boys Rodeo Roundup with his favorite bot, Roth, as his partner. When Texas loses, he offers up Roth to settle his debt, forcing The Burners to figure out a way to rescue him.
18	"Threat Level: Texas!"	Juno Lee	George Krstic	Sung Jin Ahn, Eugene Lee and David Woo	December 24, 2012	MC117	N/A
Texas is captured by Kane's forces, and tries to convince Tooley that he is the real power behind the Burners.
19	"Vega (Part 1)"	Juno Lee & Chris Prynoski	Greg Ernstrom	Sung Jin Ahn, Eugene Lee, Ed Tadem and David Woo	December 31, 2012	MC119	N/A
A mysterious prisoner breaks out of a detention center by using a powerful device that takes out all of Kane's bots. The Burners then make an unlikely alliance with the Duke of Detroit in hopes of finding the potential ally before Kane.
20	"A Better Tomorrow (Part 2)"	Juno Lee	Greg Ernstrom	Sung Jin Ahn, Eugene Lee, Ed Tadem and David Woo	January 7, 2013	MC120	N/A
With Mike Chilton held in captivity and Kane's Genesis Pod moments away from being activated, the Burners must work together to fight the biggest threat they have ever faced and prevent Motorcity from being destroyed forever.

== Production ==
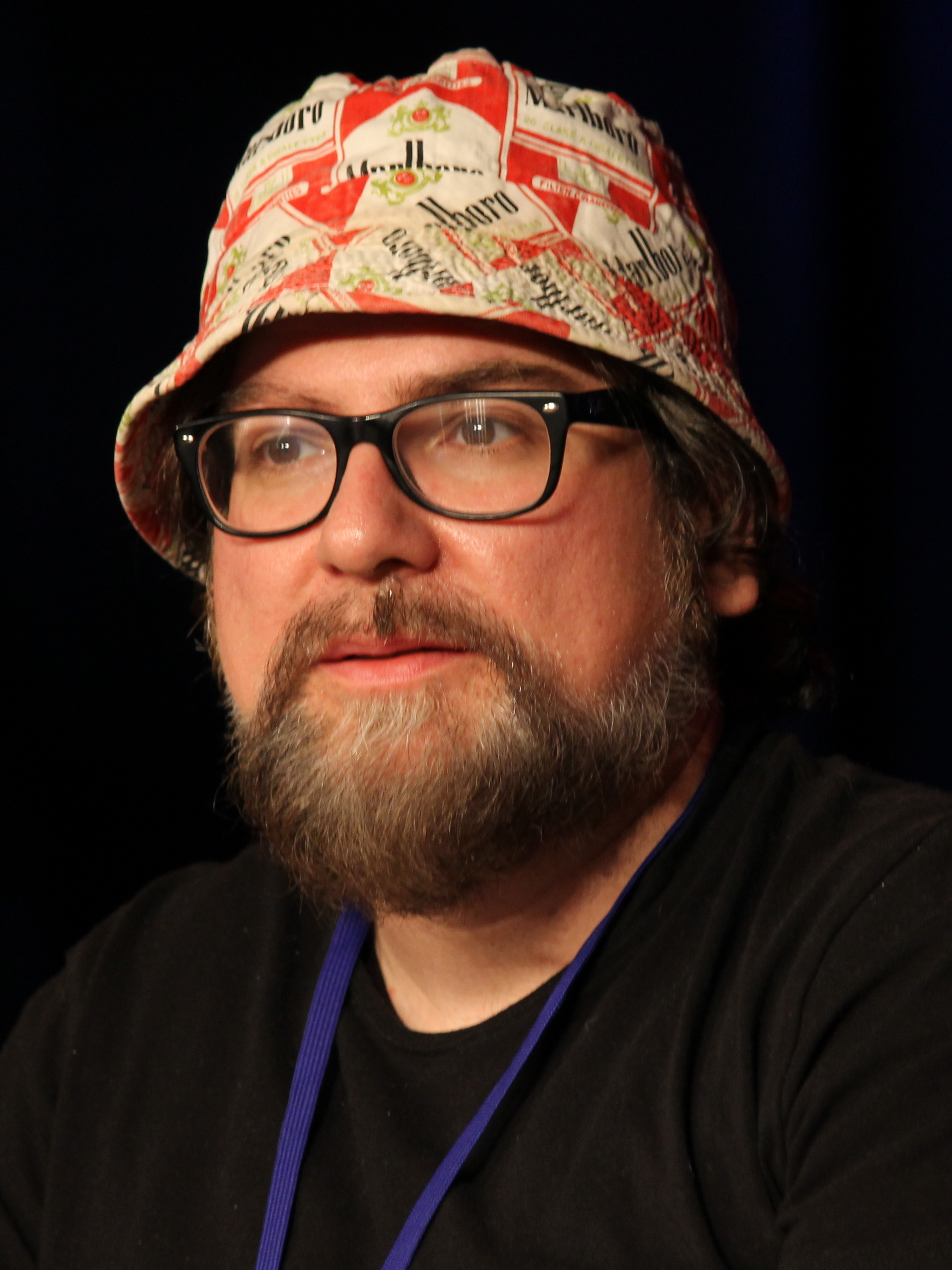
Series creator Chris Prynoski, at the Magic City Comic Con in 2015.

=== Development ===
Series creator Chris Prynoski conceived the idea for the show in the early 1990s during his tenure at MTV. According to Prynoski, he was a fan of the car culture in Los Angeles and his inspirations for Motorcity were The Dukes of Hazzard and Star Wars. Prynoski pitched the show to development executive Eric Coleman of Nickelodeon who liked it.

Around 1999, Prynoski began development of Motorcity and produced a trailer for the series. He shelved the project after he began work at Nickelodeon and Cartoon Network, and founded his T-shirt company and the animation studio Titmouse, Inc. Coleman had moved to Disney Television Animation and asked Prynoski whether he still had Motorcity. Prynoski produced a pilot episode, which Disney screened in March 2010. Prynoski and Disney agreed to produce a season of 20 episodes.

Production began later that October. Around 80 people were involved, some being from Europe and Japan, such as art director Antonio Canobbio, show director Juno Lee, vehicle designer Brandon Cuellar, and concept designer Robert Valley.

Though it was not designed as a serial, Prynoski stated that "once the first few episodes set the stage, there will be more of a story arc. As the season unfolds, viewers can expect character-focused episodes that dig a little deeper into each of the Burners' personalities and backstories."

=== Animation ===
Motorcity's animation was made with a combination of 2D and 3D elements and effects, using software such as Adobe Flash for 2D animation, Autodesk Maya for 3D models and animation, and Adobe Photoshop for background creation. Nepal-based studio Incessant Rain also provided visual effects using Adobe After Effects. Additionally, for the series' production, Prynoski's company Titmouse, Inc. created Facinator, a custom plug-in tool for Adobe Flash, that allowed the manipulation of 2D rigged head models from a wide array of angles, to mimic CGI rigged animation.

== Marketing and broadcast ==
Motorcity was scheduled to be released at the fall of 2011. However, the show was delayed, with the latest date being given around winter 2012. It was ultimately pushed back to April. Disney sponsored the promotion of the series, with Stephan Verdier competing in the Global RallyCross Championship in a Hyundai Veloster along with Rhys Millen. A mobile game titled Motorcity: Drive was also released for iTunes and Disney XD's website in March 26, 2012. It was a six-level, 3D racing shooter game, in which the player control Mike's car, as they battle Kane's army of robots with various weapons.

The series debuted on April 30, on Disney XD, followed by an HD quality release on the iTunes Store in May. At San Diego Comic-Con in July 2012, the producers showed "never-before-seen" clips from then-new episodes of the show. The series also premiered in Canada, on May 26. In Latin American countries, after first premiering online in 2013, the show premiered on Disney Channel on September 16, 2023. On January 1, 2022, all episodes from Motorcity were made available on Disney+ Hotstar in Indonesia, Malaysia and Thailand.

== Reception ==
=== Critical reception ===
Emily Ashby of Common Sense Media gave the show four out of five stars; and described the series as "too dark and intense for young kids". Yet, she argued that "it's rare to find an action-adventure cartoon that illustrates underlying social messages promoting awareness and activism". She also argued that the series is a "great jumping-off point for talking about everything from politics to current events and issues".

=== Accolades ===
Year	Award	Category	Episode	Result	Ref.
2012	40th Annie Awards	Best General Audience Animated Television Production	Blonde Thunder	Nominated	
2013	40th Annie Awards	Special Achievement in Animation	Blonde Thunder	Nominated	
2013	40th Annie Awards	Best General Audience Animated Television Production		Nominated	
2014	41st Annie Awards	Best General Audience Animated Television/Broadcast Production		Nominated	

== Future ==
On November 5, 2012, it was revealed on the fan-run peopleofmotorcity Tumblr page that the series would not be renewed for a second season. This was partially due to Disney moving the show around different time slots, airing episodes out of order, and airing episodes in other countries before the United States. This led to Disney ultimately deciding to cancel the series. Despite its impending cancellation, the showrunners were able to finish its production in time, producing a two-part series finale.
