= Chris Prynoski =

American film and television producer

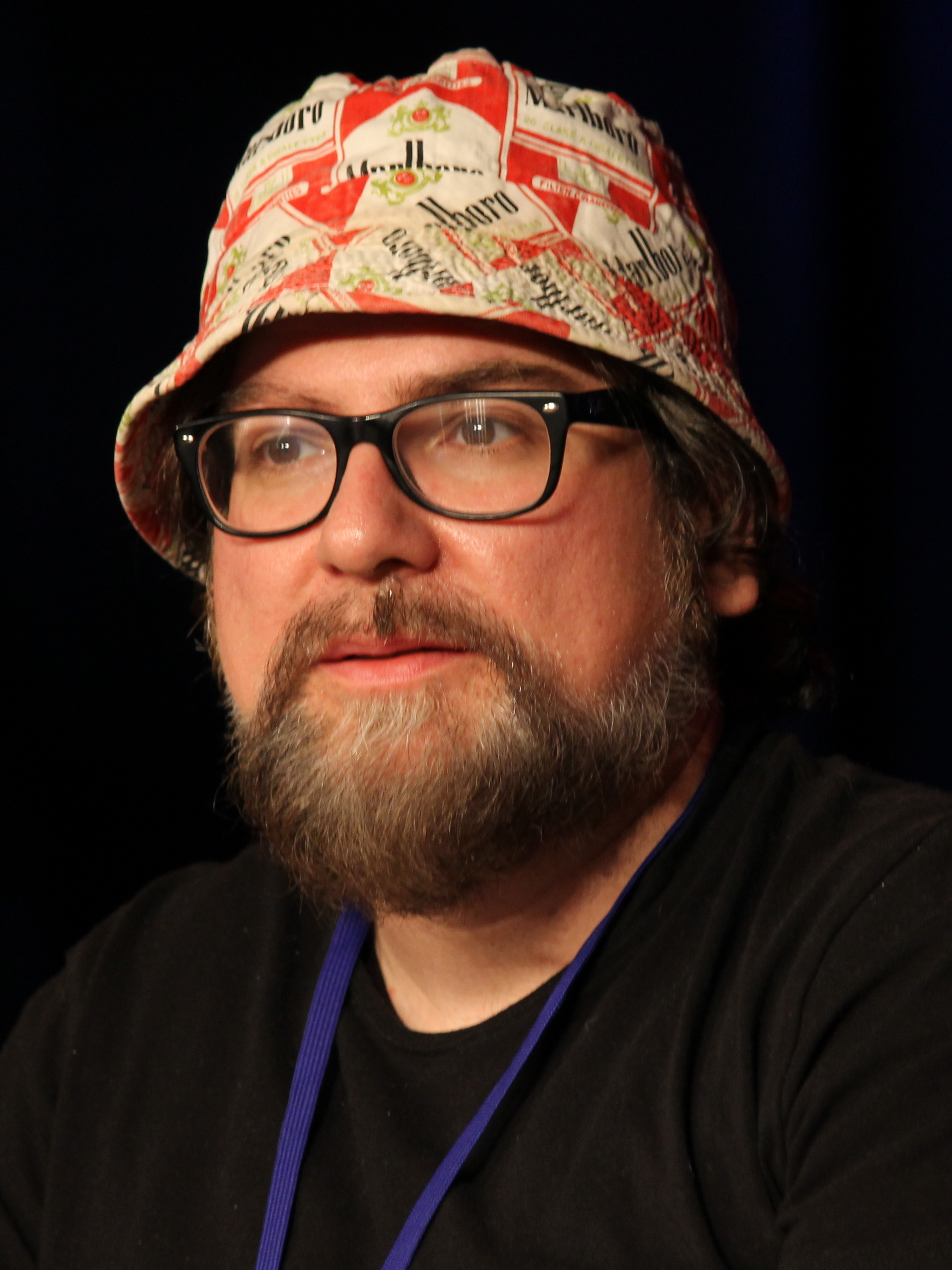
- Prynoski at the Magic City Comic Con in 2015
- Born: Christian Prynoski; Trenton, New Jersey, U.S.
- Occupations: Film and television producer; director; animator; storyboard artist
- Spouse: Shannon Prynoski

Christian Prynoski is an American film and television producer, director, animator, storyboard artist, and the co-founder and president of the independent animation studio Titmouse, Inc.. He is known for his work on various animated television series such as Downtown, Metalocalypse, Freaknik: The Musical, Motorcity, Megas XLR, and films such as Beavis and Butt-Head Do America and Nerdland.

== Early life ==
Prynoski was born in Trenton, New Jersey and grew up in Bordentown, New Jersey. He attended local public schools in Bordentown and then Notre Dame High School, and remembers doodling constantly in class. After high school, he pursued art school and graduated from the School of Visual Arts in 1994.

== Career ==
Prynoski began his career working in New York City, mostly on his own or through MTV's in-house studio on shows like Daria and Beavis and Butt-Head. He also created his own show, Downtown, which was nominated for a primetime Emmy Award in 2000. His directorial work in the hallucination sequence of Beavis and Butt-Head Do America was nominated for "Best Animated Sequence in a Feature Film" by the National Cartoonists Society.

In the same year, he moved to Hollywood, California, where he opened his own studio Titmouse, Inc.
