= Titmouse, Inc. =

American animation studio

- Formerly: Titmouse Productions
- Type: Private
- Founded: 2000; 26 years ago
- Founders: Chris Prynoski; Shannon Prynoski
- Headquarters: Los Angeles, California, U.S.
- Key people: Chris Prynoski (CEO); Shannon Prynoski (CFO & secretary); Antonio Canobbio (SVP & CCO); Ben Kalina (VP & COO); Juno Lee (officer); Mike Roush (officer)
- Number of employees: 700 (2017)
- Subsidiaries: Titmouse New York; Titmouse Canada; Titmouse Paris
- Website: titmouse.net

Titmouse, Inc. (also known as Titmouse Animation or simply Titmouse; formerly known as Titmouse Productions) is an American animation studio based in Los Angeles, California, founded in 2000 by Chris and Shannon Prynoski. The studio develops and produces animated television programs, feature films, music videos, title sequences, commercials, and short films. Its name is derived from the titmouse bird, which serves as the company's mascot.

== History ==
Founder and CEO Chris Prynoski began working at MTV in New York on shows such as Daria, Beavis and Butt-Head, and his own creation, Downtown, which was nominated for a primetime Emmy Award. In the early 2000s, Prynoski opened a small T-shirt company with his wife, Shannon Prynoski. However, upon getting more requests for cartoons than for T-shirts, they decided to abandon screen-printing in favor of animation. The Prynoskis moved to California, and opened the revamped Titmouse, Inc., an animation studio. Antonio Canobbio, who had worked with Chris Prynoski at MTV and both Prynoskis at Cartoon Network in L.A., was hired as creative director. Titmouse opened a games division in 2009.

Due to projects like Cartoon Network's Metalocalypse, Superjail! and The Venture Bros. the company expanded and opened a sister studio in New York City in 2010. The California studio later added a wholly owned subsidiary, Robin Redbreast, which was then unionized in order to produce Motorcity for Disney XD.

The company has a YouTube channel, Rug Burn, launched in December 2012 with 6 Point Harness. Rug Burn was launched with a handful of shows.

In April 2016, Titmouse released its first feature-length film, the R-rated Nerdland, which stars Paul Rudd and Patton Oswalt. Two years later, in 2018, Titmouse became the studio behind the Disney and Lucasfilm YouTube series of one-minute shorts, Star Wars: Galaxy of Adventures. The series is directed by Titmouse’s Barry Kelly.

=== Unionizing ===
In October 2020, Titmouse Vancouver became the first animation studio in Canada to join a union. Following a vote that captured 87% of the workforce, 98% of Titmouse Vancouver's workforce voted to join the newly founded Animation Guild IATSE Local 938. In response to this, some said that the issues raised by the workers of Titmouse were the same ones heard "from unrepresented animation workers everywhere" and that the unionization of the Titmouse workers acknowledges the contributions by animation workers to the industry. (Note: A related union is The Animation Guild, IATSE Local 839, formerly named the Motion Picture Screen Cartoonists, located in Burbank, California)

In January 2022, the employees of Titmouse New York formed a union with Animation Guild IATSE Local 839, the first to do so outside of Los Angeles County in more than 70 years. In the card check process, Titmouse NY employees showed more than 90% of support for the organizing effort. Following the union becoming public, Titmouse management chose to voluntarily recognize the union and agreed to negotiate with the Animation Guild in good faith.

== Partnerships ==
Titmouse has been the animation studio for the Paramount+ comedy series Star Trek: Lower Decks since 2020. In early 2020, Titmouse signed a multiyear production deal with Netflix. Titmouse and Netflix co-produced the Pendleton Ward and Duncan Trussell-created series The Midnight Gospel, which aired the same year. Also for Netflix, Titmouse animated an episode of Blur Studio's sci-fi anthology series Love, Death & Robots titled "Kill Team Kill".

Titmouse worked with Critical Role Productions and Amazon MGM Studios to co-produce and serve as the animation studio for two Amazon Prime Video series which adapt the actual play web series Critical Role: The Legend of Vox Machina (2022) and The Mighty Nein (2025).

Titmouse also co-produced the Emmy-nominated spinoff series, The Boys Presents: Diabolical for Amazon Prime Video, and produced the adult animated science fiction television series Scavengers Reign with Green Street Pictures in 2023, with Chris Prynoski serving as an executive producer.

In 2024, Titmouse, Inc. announced a partnership with Polygon Pictures for multiple CG animated series.

== Filmography ==
=== Television ===
Series	Year	Notes	Network
2002 MTV Movie Awards	2002	Opening and graphics	MTV
The Osbournes	2002	Main titles (produced for Ka-Chew!)	MTV
Megas XLR	2004–05	Main titles, additional animation (season 1 only)	Cartoon Network
Avatar: The Last Airbender	2005–08	Main title sequence	Nickelodeon
The Simple Life	2006	Season 4 opening (produced for Ka-Chew!)	Fox
Shorty McShorts' Shorts	2006	"Dudley and Nestor Do Nothing" (animation production)	Disney Channel
American Dad!	2006	Preproduction for MMORPG scenes in "Dungeons and Wagons"	Fox
Metalocalypse	2006–13		Adult Swim
Class of 3000	2007	Digital effects	Cartoon Network
Afro Samurai	2007	Opening	Funimation
Frank TV	2007	"Frankincense and Myrrh" (animation)	TBS
Happy Monster Band	2007–08		Playhouse Disney
G.I. Joe: Resolute	2009		Adult Swim
DJ & the Fro	2009		MTV
Attack of the Show!	2009	"Slasher School" shorts	G4
Freaknik: The Musical	2010		Adult Swim
Black Panther	2010		BET
Mad	2010–11	Additional animation	Cartoon Network
Superjail!	2011–14	Seasons 2–4	Adult Swim
The Venture Bros.	2011–18	Seasons 5–7, three specials	Adult Swim
Black Dynamite	2011–12	Season 1	Adult Swim
Community	2011–12	Animated sequences in "A Fistful of Paintballs", "Foosball and Nocturnal Vigilantism" and "Digital Estate Planning"	NBC
China, IL	2011–15		Adult Swim
Sesame Street: Growing Hope Against Hunger	2011	"Hunger" sequence	PBS
Motorcity	2012–13		Disney XD
Randy Cunningham: 9th Grade Ninja	2012–15		Disney XD
Liquid Television	2013		MTV
Turbo FAST	2013–16		Netflix
Breadwinners	2014–16	Animation credited as "Titmouse Canada Animation Inc."	Nickelodeon
TripTank	2014–16	"Jerk Chicken" shorts	Comedy Central
King Star King	2014	Series only	Adult Swim
Hot in Cleveland	2014	"The Animated Episode"	TV Land
Kirby Buckets	2014–17	Animation	Disney XD
Niko and the Sword of Light	2015–19		Amazon Prime Video
Moonbeam City	2015		Comedy Central
TMNT Half-Shell Heroes: Blast to the Past	2015		Nickelodeon
Rachel Dratch's Late Night Snack	2016	Animated sequences	TruTV
Brad Neely's Harg Nallin' Sclopio Peepio	2016		Adult Swim
Comedy Crib	2016	Intro, transitions, promos	IFC
Little Big Awesome	2016–18		Amazon Prime Video
Home: Adventures with Tip and Oh	2016–18	Animation	Netflix
Future-Worm!	2016–18	Animation	Disney XD
Son of Zorn	2016–17	Animation	Fox
Hanazuki: Full of Treasures	2017–19		YouTube (season 1)
Hanazuki: Full of Treasures	2017–19		Discovery Family (season 2)
Uncle Grandpa	2017	"More Director Shorts"	Cartoon Network
Halt and Catch Fire	2017	Pilgrim gameplay	AMC
Disjointed	2017–18	Animated sequences	Netflix
Goldie and Bear	2017–18	Season 2	Disney Junior
Big Mouth	2017–25		Netflix
Project Runway All Stars	2018	"Thrown for a Loop by Betty Boop" (animation)	Lifetime
Bobcat Goldthwait's Misfits & Monsters	2018	"Bubba the Bear" (animation)	TruTV
Neo Yokio: Pink Christmas	2018		Netflix
Ballmastrz: 9009	2018–20		Adult Swim
Tigtone	2018–20		Adult Swim
The Epic Tales of Captain Underpants	2018–20	Animation	Netflix
Deadly Class	2019	Animated sequences	Syfy
T.O.T.S.	2019–22		Disney Junior
Mao Mao: Heroes of Pure Heart	2019–20		Cartoon Network
Archibald's Next Big Thing	2019–21	Animation	Netflix (seasons 1–2)
Archibald's Next Big Thing	2019–21	Animation	Peacock (seasons 3–6)
Bless the Harts	2019–21	Animation	Fox
Cleopatra in Space	2020–21	Animation	Peacock
Kinderwood	2020–21	Animation	Noggin
The Midnight Gospel	2020		Netflix
Star Trek: Lower Decks	2020–24		Paramount+
Animaniacs	2020–23	Animation	Hulu
Baby Shark's Big Show!	2020–25	Animation credited as "Titmouse Canada Animation Inc."	Nickelodeon
WandaVision	2021	2D animated sequences ("Don't Touch That Dial" only)	Disney+
Loki	2021	2D animated sequences	Disney+
Mythic Quest	2021	Animated backstory sequence (Special Episode: "Everlight")	Apple TV+
Devil May Care	2021		TZGZ
Looney Tunes Cartoons	2021	"Red, White and Bruised"	HBO Max
We the People	2021		Netflix
I Heart Arlo	2021		Netflix
Q-Force	2021		
The Harper House	2021		Paramount+
Maya and the Three	2021	Signatory services	Netflix
Inside Job	2021	"Buzzkill" (additional design)	Netflix
Chicago Party Aunt	2021–22		Netflix
Fairfax	2021–22		Amazon Prime Video
Harriet the Spy	2021–23		Apple TV+
The Legend of Vox Machina	2022–present	Animation	Amazon Prime Video
Beavis and Butt-Head	2022–present	Animation	Paramount+ (seasons 9–10)
Beavis and Butt-Head	2022–present	Animation	Comedy Central (season 11)
The Boys Presents: Diabolical	2022		Amazon Prime Video
Trivia Quest	2022		Netflix
The Paloni Show! Halloween Special!	2022	Animation; "Palonis", "Banana Party", "Shitty Betelgeuse", "Slashtronaut"	Hulu
Human Resources	2022–23		Netflix
Duck & Goose	2022–23		Apple Studios
Pantheon	2022–23		AMC+ (season 1)
Pantheon	2022–23		Amazon Prime Video (season 2)
Love, Death & Robots	2022, 2025	"Kill Team Kill", "How Zeke Got Religion"	Netflix
My Dad the Bounty Hunter	2023	2D sequences	Netflix
Super Turbo Story Time	2023		MotorTrend+
Agent Elvis	2023		Netflix
Star Trek: Strange New Worlds	2023	"Those Old Scientists" (animated sequences)	Paramount+
Scavengers Reign	2023		Max
The Ghost and Molly McGee	2023	"Game On" (animation production)	Disney Channel
Kiff	2023–present		Disney Channel
Digman!	2023–present		Comedy Central
Pupstruction	2023–present		Disney Jr.
Royal Crackers	2023–24		Adult Swim
Frog and Toad	2023–24		Apple TV+
The Second Best Hospital in the Galaxy	2024–present		Amazon Prime Video
Everybody Still Hates Chris	2024–present		Comedy Central
The Milk Chug	2024–present		YouTube
Angry Birds Mystery Island	2024		Amazon Prime Video
Invincible	2024	Additional Design; 3 episodes (with Rooster Teeth)	Amazon Prime Video
Invincible Fight Girl	2024	Animation	Adult Swim
Jentry Chau vs. the Underworld	2024		Netflix
Tales of the Teenage Mutant Ninja Turtles	2024–25	Animation	Paramount+
Haunted Hotel	2025–present	Animation	Netflix
StuGo	2025		Disney Channel
The Sisters Grimm	2025		Apple TV+
The Mighty Nein	2025–present	Animation	Amazon Prime Video
The Elephant	2025		Adult Swim
Strip Law	2026		Netflix
Smiling Friends	2026	Animation; 2 episodes credited as "Titmouse Canada Animation Inc."	Adult Swim
Kevin	2026		Amazon Prime Video
Gameoverse	2026	Compositing services; Pilot only credited as "Titmouse Canada Animation Inc."	YouTube
Mating Season	2026		Netflix
Among Us	2026	Animation	Paramount+
Golden Axe	2026	Animation	Paramount+
Dang!	2026		Netflix
Forgotten Runes Wizard's Cult	TBA		
Magic Machine	TBA		
Mister Miracle	TBA		
Nights	TBA		

==== Pilots ====
Title	Year	Network	Notes
The Amazing Screw-On Head	2006	Sci Fi	
Let's Fish	2007	Adult Swim	
Motorcity (Motor City)	2010	Disney XD	Unaired/unreleased; but screened on March 2, 2010.
Major Lazer	2011	Adult Swim	Unaired/unreleased
Yoyotoki HappyEars	2015	Amazon Prime Video	
Doble Fried	2015	Adult Swim	Unaired/unreleased; co-produced with PFFFR
I Love You Mao Mao: Bao Bao's Revenge	2016	Cartoon Network	Unaired/unreleased; but screened at the "5 Second Day" event on February 19, 2016,
Lazor Wulf	2016	Adult Swim	Unaired/unreleased
Very Important House	2016	Disney XD	Unaired/unreleased; Animation for "Next Time On" sequence
The New V.I.P's	2017	Amazon Prime Video	
Trap Universe	2018	Adult Swim	

=== Feature films ===
Title	Release date	Co-production with	Distributor	Note
Freddy Got Fingered	April 20, 2001	Regency Enterprises	20th Century Fox	"Zebras in America" animation sequences and artwork; first project done by Titmouse
Wonderland	October 3, 2003	Flirt Pictures; Emmett/Furla Films	Lions Gate Films	"Dive the Loot" sequence
Hood of Horror	June 27, 2006	Social Capital Films; BloodWorks; Snoopadelic Films	Xenon Pictures	Animation sequences (with Madhouse)
Baton	April 28, 2009	Wild Boar Media		Animation
Sunset Strip	2012			Animation
Girl Rising	March 7, 2013	Vulcan Productions; The Documentary Group		"Egypt" sequence
Her	December 18, 2013	Annapurna Pictures	Warner Bros. Pictures	Giant Man Sequence
Scooby-Doo! and Kiss: Rock and Roll Mystery	July 10, 2015	Warner Bros. Animation	Warner Home Video	Title sequence
Team Hot Wheels: The Skill to Thrill!	August 17, 2015	Mattel Playground Productions	Netflix	Animation services
Team Hot Wheels: Build the Epic Race!	October 5, 2015	Mattel Playground Productions	Netflix	Animation services
Nerdland	December 6, 2016	AKW Worldwide; Pariah	Samuel Goldwyn Films	Theatrical animated feature film
Father of the Year	July 20, 2018	Happy Madison Productions	Netflix	Virtual reality sequences
Teen Titans Go! To the Movies	July 27, 2018	Warner Bros. Animation	Warner Bros. Pictures	"My Superhero Movie" sequence
Next Gen	September 7, 2018	Baozou Manhua; Alibaba Pictures; Tangent Animation	Netflix	Additional pre-production services
Borat Subsequent Moviefilm	October 23, 2020	Four by Two Films	Amazon Studios	Animation services
Finding ʻOhana	January 29, 2021	Ian Bryce Productions	Netflix	2D animation
Arlo the Alligator Boy	April 16, 2021	Netflix Animation	Netflix	Production services
Wish Dragon	June 11, 2021	Columbia Pictures; Sony Pictures Animation; Beijing Sparkle Roll Media Corporation; Tencent Pictures; Base Media; Flagship Entertainment Group; Boss Collaboration; Cultural Investment Holdings	Netflix	Production services
Beavis and Butt-Head Do the Universe	June 23, 2022	MTV Entertainment Studios; Judgemental Films; 3 Arts Entertainment	Paramount+	Animation
Spider-Man: Across the Spider-Verse	June 2, 2023	Columbia Pictures; Sony Pictures Animation; Marvel Entertainment; Pascal Pictures; Lord Miller Productions; Arad Productions	Sony Pictures Releasing	Production services
Taz: Quest for Burger	June 6, 2023	Warner Bros. Animation	Warner Bros. Home Entertainment	Animation
The Venture Bros.: Radiant Is the Blood of the Baboon Heart	July 21, 2023	Williams Street; Astro Base GO!	Warner Bros. Home Entertainment	Animation
Strays	August 18, 2023	Lord Miller Productions; Picturestart; Rabbit Hole Productions	Universal Pictures	Animated sequence
Metalocalypse: Army of the Doomstar	August 22, 2023	Williams Street	Warner Bros. Home Entertainment	Animation
Trolls Band Together	November 17, 2023	DreamWorks Animation	Universal Pictures	2D animation
The Day the Earth Blew Up: A Looney Tunes Movie	March 14, 2025	Warner Bros. Animation	Ketchup Entertainment	One sequence only.
M3GAN 2.0	June 27, 2025	Blumhouse Productions; Atomic Monster	Universal Pictures	2D animation services
Street Fighter	October 16, 2026	Legendary Pictures; Capcom	Paramount Pictures	2D animation services

=== Music videos ===
Title	Year	Artist	Notes
Let's Get Dirty (I Can't Get in da Club)	2001	Redman	Animation
Breaking the Habit	2004	Linkin Park	With Gonzo Digimation
Dirty Little Thing	2004	Velvet Revolver	Animation (produced for ka-chew!)
Heartless	2009	The Fray	
Black Rain	2009	Soundgarden	
The Wind	2012	Zac Brown Band	
Miss Atomic Bomb	2012	The Killers	Animation
The Story of O.J.	2017	Jay-Z	Character animation
Hallucinate	2020	Dua Lipa	Character animation
Don't Cry	2020	MorMor	
Yankee and the Brave	2020	Run the Jewels	
Area21: La La La; Pogo; Mona Lisa; Lovin' Every Minute; Followers; Own The Night; Time Machine	2021	Area21	

=== Short films ===
Title	Year	Production company	Notes
Dee Dee and Dexter	2003	Cartoon Network	Produced for Klasky Csupo
The Hidden Life of the Burrowing Owl	2008		
Barko	2009		
Pinched	2010		
Scott Pilgrim vs. The Animation	2010	Adult Swim	Released before the featured film, Scott Pilgrim vs the World
Underworld: Endless War	2011	Lakeshore Entertainment	
Gotham City Impostors animated shorts	2011	Cartoon Network	
Diablo III: Wrath	2012	Blizzard Entertainment	
Healthy Teeth, Healthy Me	2012	Sesame Workshop	Captain Super Ultra Mega Smile Man segments
R.I.P.D.	2013	Adult Swim	
Very Important House	2015	Disney Television Animation	
Team Hot Wheels: Search for the 5th Driver!	2015	Mattel Playground Productions	
Space Face	2015	Nickelodeon	
Menehunes	2015	Nickelodeon	
TMNT Summer Shorts	2016–17	Nickelodeon	"Don vs. Raph" and "We Strike Hard & Fade Into the Night"
Toonami Exquisite Corpse	2017	Adult Swim	
Rick and Morty Exquisite Corpse	2017	Adult Swim	
Bluehilda	2017		
Heroes of the Storm: Obey the Call	2017	Blizzard Entertainment	
Imaginary Friend Society: Long Hospital Stays	2017	Pediatric Brain Tumor Foundation	
Star Wars Galaxy of Adventures	2018–20	Lucasfilm	
Lost Kitties	2018	Hasbro	
Spider-Ham: Caught in a Ham	2019	Sony Pictures Animation	
HBO Backstories	2019	HBO	"Barry"
WTF is Christmas?	2021	20th Television Animation	Opening animation
It Takes Three	2024	DreamWorks Animation	2D animation
An Almost Christmas Story	2024	Disney Branded Television; Esperanto Filmoj; Maere Studios; 88 Pictures	Christmas stop-motion short.

=== Video games ===
Title	Year	Production company	Notes
Guitar Hero III: Legends of Rock	2007	Neversoft	Cinematics
Guitar Hero Aerosmith	2008	Neversoft	Intro and outro cinematics
Guitar Hero World Tour	2008	Neversoft	Cinematics
Guitar Hero: Metallica	2009	Neversoft	Cinematics
Guitar Hero Smash Hits	2009	Neversoft	Cinematics
Marvel Heroes	2013	Gazillion Entertainment	Opening cinematic
The Legend of Korra	2014	PlatinumGames	Cinematics
Soundfall	2018	Drastic Games	Trailer
Indivisible	2018	Lab Zero Games	Opening cinematic (co-animated with Trigger)
Speed Brawl	2018	Double Stallion	Animated launch trailer
Apex Legends	2019	Respawn Entertainment	"Stories from the Outlands: A Father's Letter"
SpongeBob SquarePants: Battle for Bikini Bottom – Rehydrated	2019	Purple Lamp Studios	Teaser
Hi-Fi Rush	2023	Tango Gameworks	Cinematics
Spectre Divide	2024	Mountaintop Studios	Animated launch trailer
