= List of Disney Television Animation productions =

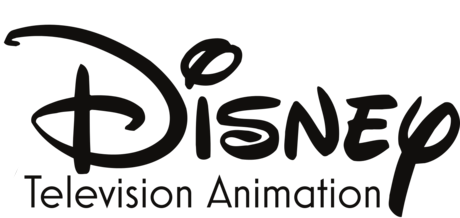

This article contains a list of productions made by the American animation studio Disney Television Animation, a part of Disney Kids & Family and owned by The Walt Disney Company. This list includes animated television series, films, specials and other projects.

== Television series ==
=== Original series ===
#	Title	Creator(s) / Showrunner(s)	Year(s)	Network	Co-production(s)	Notes
1980s
1	The Wuzzles	Fred Wolf	1985	CBS		
2	Adventures of the Gummi Bears	Jymn Magon	1985–91	NBC (1985–88); ABC (1989–90); Syndication (1990–91)		First syndicated series as part of The Disney Afternoon.
3	DuckTales	Jymn Magon	1987–90	Syndication		Based on the Duckverse comics by Carl Barks.
4	The New Adventures of Winnie the Pooh	Karl Geurs	1988–91	Disney Channel (1988); ABC (1988–91)		Based on Winnie the Pooh. Winner of 2 Emmy Awards for Outstanding Animated Program of 1988 and 1989.
5	Chip 'n Dale: Rescue Rangers	Tad Stones; Alan Zaslove	1989–90	Disney Channel (1989); Syndication (1989–90)		
1990s
6	TaleSpin	Jymn Magon; Mark Zaslove	1990–91	Disney Channel (1990); Syndication (1990–91)		Based on The Jungle Book.
7	Darkwing Duck	Tad Stones	1991–92	Disney Channel (1991); Syndication (1991–92); ABC (1991–92)		
8	Goof Troop	Robert Taylor; Michael Peraza	1992	Disney Channel (1992); Syndication (1992); ABC (1992)		
9	The Little Mermaid	Jamie Mitchell	1992–94	CBS		Prequel to The Little Mermaid.
10	Raw Toonage	Larry Latham; Ed Wexler	1992	CBS		
11	Bonkers	Larry Latham; Greg Weisman; Duane Capizzi; Robert Hathcock; Jay Lender; Len Smith	1993–94	Disney Channel (1993); Syndication (1993–94)		Both originated as segments of Raw Toonage before they were spun off into their own shows.
12	Marsupilami	Ed Wexler	1993	CBS		Both originated as segments of Raw Toonage before they were spun off into their own shows.
13	Aladdin	Tad Stones; Alan Zaslove	1994–95	Disney Channel (1994); Syndication (1994–95); CBS (1994–95)		Sequel to Aladdin and The Return of Jafar.
14	Gargoyles	Greg Weisman	1994–97	Syndication (1994–96); ABC (1996–97)		
15	The Shnookums & Meat Funny Cartoon Show	Bill Kopp	1995	Syndication		
16	Timon & Pumbaa	Bobs Gannaway; Tony Craig	1995–99	Syndication (1995–96); CBS (1995–96); Toon Disney (1999)		Spin-off of The Lion King.
17	Quack Pack	Toby Shelton; Kevin Hopps	1996	Syndication		
18	Mighty Ducks: The Animated Series	Marty Isenberg; Robert N. Skir; David Wise; Gordon Kent	1996–97	ABC; Syndication		Animated spin-off of The Mighty Ducks.
19	Doug	Jim Jinkins; David Campbell; Joe Aaron	1996–99	ABC; Syndication (1998–99)	Jumbo Pictures	Seasons 5-7 only. First and only animated series of the studio inherited from Nickelodeon.
20	Jungle Cubs	Mark S. Bernthal	1996–98	ABC		Prequel to The Jungle Book.
21	Nightmare Ned	Donovan Cook	1997	ABC	Creative Capers Entertainment	The studio was uncredited.
22	101 Dalmatians: The Series	Jim Jinkins; David Campbell	1997–98	ABC; Syndication	Jumbo Pictures	Spin-off of 101 Dalmatians and its 1996 live-action remake.
23	Recess	Paul Germain; Joe Ansolabehere	1997–2001	ABC; UPN (1999–2001)	Paul & Joe Productions (specials)	
24	Pepper Ann	Sue Rose	1997–2001	ABC; UPN (2000); Toon Disney/Disney Channel (2001)		
25	Hercules: The Animated Series	Mark McCorkle; Bob Schooley	1998–99	Syndication; ABC		Spin-off of Hercules.
26	Mickey Mouse Works	Bobs Gannaway	1999–2000	ABC		
2000s
27	The Weekenders	Doug Langdale	2000–04	ABC (2000–01); UPN (2001); Toon Disney (2002–04)		
28	Teacher's Pet	Gary Baseman; Bill Steinkellner; Cheri Steinkellner	2000–02	ABC (2000–01); Toon Disney (2002)		
29	Buzz Lightyear of Star Command	Mark McCorkle; Bob Schooley	2000–01	UPN (2000); ABC (2000–01)	Pixar Animation Studios	Spin-off of Toy Story.
30	House of Mouse	Bobs Gannaway; Tony Craig	2001–03	ABC (2001–02); Toon Disney (2002–03)		Spin-off of Mickey Mouse Works.
31	Lloyd in Space	Paul Germain; Joe Ansolabehere	2001–04	ABC (2001–02); Disney Channel (2002); Toon Disney (2002–04)	Paul & Joe Productions	
32	The Legend of Tarzan	Bob Roth; Bill Motz	2001–03	UPN		Sequel to Tarzan.
33	Teamo Supremo	Phil Walsh	2002–04	ABC (2002–03); Toon Disney (2003–04)		
34	Kim Possible	Mark McCorkle; Bob Schooley	2002–07	Disney Channel; ABC		
35	Fillmore!	Scott M. Gimple	2002–04	ABC (2002–04); Toon Disney (2004)		
36	Lilo & Stitch: The Series	Chris Sanders; Dean DeBlois; Bobs Gannaway; Jess Winfield	2003–06	Disney Channel; ABC		Sequel to Lilo & Stitch and Stitch! The Movie.
37	Dave the Barbarian	Doug Langdale	2004–05	Disney Channel		
38	Brandy & Mr. Whiskers	Russell Marcus	2004–06	Disney Channel		
39	Super Robot Monkey Team Hyperforce Go!	Ciro Nieli	2004–06	Toon Disney; ABC Family; ABC	The Answer Studio	The studio was credited as Jetix Animation Concepts.
40	American Dragon: Jake Long	Jeff Goode; Eddie Guzelian; Matt Negrete	2005–07	Disney Channel; ABC		
41	The Buzz on Maggie	Dave Polsky	2005–06	Disney Channel; ABC		
42	Get Ed	Andy Knight	2005–06	Toon Disney; ABC Family	Red Rover Studios (Note: As stated in the ending credits.)	The studio was credited as Jetix Animation Concepts.
43	The Emperor's New School	Mark Dindal	2006–08	Disney Channel; ABC		Sequel and spin-off of The Emperor's New Groove.
44	The Replacements	Dan Santat	2006–09	Disney Channel; ABC		
45	Shorty McShorts' Shorts	Barry Blumberg; John Solomon	2006–07	Disney Channel		Anthology and variety series. The first and only shorts program of the studio.
46	Yin Yang Yo!	Bob Boyle	2006–09	Toon Disney (2006–09); ABC Family (2006); Disney XD (2009)		The studio was credited as Jetix Animation Concepts.
47	Phineas and Ferb	Dan Povenmire; Jeff "Swampy" Marsh	2007–15; 2025–present	Disney Channel; Disney XD (2009–15); Disney+ (2025–present)		
2010s
48	Kick Buttowski: Suburban Daredevil	Sandro Corsaro	2010–12	Disney XD		
49	Fish Hooks	Noah Z. Jones	2010–14	Disney Channel		
50	Motorcity	Chris Prynoski; David Bickel	2012–13	Disney XD	Titmouse, Inc.	
51	Tron: Uprising	Edward Kitsis; Adam Horowitz	2012–13	Disney XD	Polygon Pictures; Sean Bailey Productions	Animated sequel to Tron
52	Gravity Falls	Alex Hirsch	2012–16	Disney Channel (2012–13); Disney XD (2014–16)		
53	Randy Cunningham: 9th Grade Ninja	Jed Elinoff; Scott Thomas	2012–15	Disney XD	Titmouse, Inc. Boulder Media Limited	The studio was uncredited.
54	Mickey Mouse	Paul Rudish	2013–19	Disney Channel		
55	Wander Over Yonder	Craig McCracken	2013–16	Disney Channel (2013–14); Disney XD (2014–16)		
56	The 7D	Noah Z. Jones	2014–16	Disney XD		Prequel to Snow White and the Seven Dwarfs. Originally produced for Disney Jr.
57	Penn Zero: Part-Time Hero	Jared Bush; Sam Levine	2014–17	Disney XD		
58	Star vs. the Forces of Evil	Daron Nefcy	2015–19	Disney Channel (2015; 2019); Disney XD (2015–18)		
59	Pickle and Peanut	Noah Z. Jones; Joel Trussell	2015–18	Disney XD		
60	Descendants: Wicked World	Aliki Theofilopoulos; Jennifer Magee-Cook	2015–17	Disney Channel	Bad Angels Productions; 5678 Productions	Animated spin-off of Descendants.
61	Future-Worm!	Ryan Quincy	2016–18	Disney XD	Bento Box Entertainment; Quincy Productions	
62	Milo Murphy's Law	Dan Povenmire; Jeff "Swampy" Marsh	2016–19	Disney XD (2016–17); Disney Channel (2019)		
63	Rapunzel's Tangled Adventure	Shane Prigmore; Chris Sonnenburg; Ben Balistreri	2017–20	Disney Channel		Sequel to Tangled and Tangled: Before Ever After. Formerly known as Tangled: The Series during season 1.
64	Billy Dilley's Super-Duper Subterranean Summer	Aaron Springer	2017	Disney XD		
65	DuckTales	Matt Youngberg; Francisco Angones	2017–21	Disney XD (2017–18; 2020–21); Disney Channel (2018–19)		Reboot of the original 1987 animated series.
66	Big Hero 6: The Series	Mark McCorkle; Bob Schooley; Nick Filippi	2017–21	Disney Channel (2017–19); Disney XD (2017; 2020–21)		Sequel to Big Hero 6.
67	Big City Greens	Chris Houghton; Shane Houghton	2018–present	Disney Channel		Originally produced for Disney XD before switching to Disney Channel.
68	Amphibia	Matt Braly	2019–22	Disney Channel		
2020s
69	The Owl House	Dana Terrace	2020–23	Disney Channel		
70	The Wonderful World of Mickey Mouse	Paul Rudish	2020–23	Disney+		Revival and sequel of Mickey Mouse; Reruns on Disney XD
71	Monsters at Work	Bobs Gannaway	2021–24	Disney+ (2021); Disney Channel (2024)		Sequel to Monsters, Inc.
72	The Ghost and Molly McGee	Bill Motz; Bob Roth	2021–24	Disney Channel		
73	The Proud Family: Louder and Prouder	Bruce W. Smith	2022–26	Disney+	Bar Productions	Revival and sequel of The Proud Family.
74	Chibiverse	Gino Guzzardo; Sabrina Alberghetti	2022–present	Disney Channel		Spin-off of Chibi Tiny Tales.
75	Hamster & Gretel	Dan Povenmire	2022–25	Disney Channel		
76	Moon Girl and Devil Dinosaur	Laurence Fishburne; Helen Sugland; Steve Loter; Jeffrey M. Howard; Kate Kondell	2023–25	Disney Channel; Disney+	Marvel Animation; Cinema Gypsy Productions; Flying Bark Productions	
77	Kiff	Lucy Heavens & Nic Smal	2023–present	Disney Channel	Titmouse, Inc.	
78	Hailey's On It!	Devin Bunje & Nick Stanton	2023–24	Disney Channel		
79	Zombies: The Re-Animated Series	Aliki Theofilopoulos; Jack Ferraiolo	2024–26	Disney Channel	Atomic Cartoons	Animated spin-off of Zombies.
80	Primos	Natasha Kline	2024–25	Disney Channel		
81	StuGo	Ryan Gillis	2025	Disney Channel	Titmouse, Inc.	
82	Dragon Striker	Sylvain Dos Santos; Charles Lefebvre	2026–present	Disney Channel; Disney XD; Disney+	La Chouette Compagnie	The studio was uncredited.; Originally picked up by Disney EMEA Productions.
83	The Doomies	Andrés Fernandez; Henry Gifford; Rémi Zaarour	2026–present	Disney+	Xilam Animation	The studio was uncredited. Originally picked up by Disney EMEA Productions.
Upcoming
84	The Sunnyridge 3	Stevie Gee; Essy May	2027	Disney+	Blink Industries; Boat Rocker Studios	Originally picked up by Disney EMEA Productions.; Owned by Boat Rocker Studios
85	Darkwing Duck	Seth Rogen; Evan Goldberg; Sean Tretta; Borja Peña Gorostegui	TBA	Disney+	Point Grey Pictures; 88 Pictures; Psyop	Reboot of the original 1991 animated series.
86	Journey	Matt Munn	TBA	Disney+	Higher Ground Productions; ICON Creative Studio	
87	Kingdom Hearts: The Series	Tetsuya Nomura	TBA	Disney Channel; Disney+	Square Enix	
88	Artemis Fowl: The Animated Series	Eoin Colfer; Ben Juwono; Colleen Evanson	TBA	Disney Channel; Disney+		Based on the novel series of the same name.
89	Tinker Bell & The Glitter City	TBA	TBA	Disney Channel; Disney+		Peter Pan spin-off Revival of Disney Fairies which originated at DisneyToon Studios.
90	Cookies & Milk	Laurence Fishburne; Helen Sugland; Brian Egeston	TBA	Disney Channel	Cinema Gypsy Productions; Jesse James Films	Based on the novel of the same name.
91	TaleSpin	Seth Rogen; Evan Goldberg	TBA	Disney+	Point Grey Pictures	Reboot of the original 1990 animated series.
92	The Witchverse	Eric Darnell	TBA	Disney+	Baobab Studios	
93	Intercats	Eric Darnell; Pamela Ribon	TBA	Disney+	Baobab Studios	

=== Preschool series ===
#	Title	Creator(s) / Showrunner(s)	Year(s)	Network	Co-production(s)	Notes
1990s/2000s
1	PB&J Otter	Jim Jinkins	1998–2000	Disney Channel	Jumbo Pictures	
2	Mickey Mouse Clubhouse	Bobs Gannaway	2006–16	Disney Channel; Disney Jr. (2012–16)		
3	My Friends Tigger & Pooh	Brian Hohlfield	2007–10	Disney Channel		
4	Special Agent Oso	Ford Riley	2009–12	Disney Channel; Disney Jr. (2012)		
2010s
5	Jake and the Never Land Pirates	Bobs Gannaway	2011–16	Disney Channel; Disney Jr. (2012–16)		Spin-off of Peter Pan.
6	Sofia the First	Craig Gerber	2013–18	Disney Channel; Disney Jr.		
7	The Lion Guard	Ford Riley	2015–19	Disney Channel; Disney Jr.		Sequel and spin-off to The Lion King.
8	Elena of Avalor	Craig Gerber	2016–20	Disney Channel; Disney Jr.		Spin-off of Sofia the First.
9	Mickey Mouse Mixed-Up Adventures	Rob LaDuca; Mark Seidenberg	2017–21	Disney Channel; Disney Jr.		Formerly known as Mickey and the Roadster Racers during seasons 1–2.
10	Fancy Nancy	Jamie Mitchell; Krista Tucker	2018–22	Disney Channel; Disney Jr.		
2020s
11	Mickey Mouse Funhouse	Phil Weinstein; Thomas Hart	2021–25	Disney Channel; Disney Jr.		
12	Alice's Wonderland Bakery	Chelsea Beyl	2022–24	Disney Channel; Disney Jr.		Spin-off of Alice in Wonderland
13	Firebuds	Craig Gerber	2022–25	Disney Channel; Disney Jr.	Electric Emu Productions	
14	Mickey Mouse Clubhouse+	Rob LaDuca; Kim Duran	2025–present	Disney Channel; Disney Jr. Disney+		Revival of the original 2006 series.
15	Sofia the First: Royal Magic	Craig Gerber	2026–present	Disney Channel; Disney Jr.	Electric Emu Productions; ICON Creative Studio	Sequel to Sofia the First.
Upcoming
16	Cars: Lightning Racers	Travis Braun; Frank Montangna	2027	Disney Channel; Disney Jr.	Pixar Animation Studios; ICON Creative Studio	
17	Untitled Minnie Mouse series	TBA	2029	Disney Channel; Disney Jr.		Spin-off of Mickey Mouse Mixed-Up Adventures
18	Tiny Trailblazers	Reese Witherspoon	TBA	Disney Channel; Disney Jr.	Hello Sunshine; National Geographic Partners	
19	Dusty Dupree	Kris Wimberly	TBA	Disney Channel; Disney Jr.	Electric Emu Productions	

=== Adult animated series ===
#	Title	Creator(s) / Showrunner(s)	Year(s)	Network	Co-production(s)	Notes
2000s
1	Clerks: The Animated Series	David Mandel; Scott Mosier; Kevin Smith	2000–02	ABC (2000); Comedy Central (2002)	Miramax Television; View Askew Productions; Woltz International Pictures Corporation; Touchstone Television	Animated spin-off of Clerks. The studio was uncredited.
Upcoming
2	Rhona Who Lives by the River	Emily Kapnek	TBA	Disney+	20th Television Animation; Piece of Pie Productions; Stoopid Buddy Stoodios	Collaboration with sister studio 20th Television Animation. Stop-motion animated series.

=== Short series ===
The following is a list of short series not tied to any specific Disney TVA production or featuring characters from multiple Disney TVA productions. Some of these started as a spin-off from a specific Disney TVA series before incorporating other Disney TVA properties.

Title	Premiere date	Network(s)	Notes
Kick Buttowski: Suburban Daredevil: Shorts	February 13, 2010	Disney XD	
Take Two with Phineas and Ferb	December 3, 2010	Disney Channel	Spin-off of Phineas and Ferb.
Mickey's Mousekersize	February 14, 2011	Disney Jr. YouTube	Spin-off of Mickey Mouse Clubhouse.
Special Agent Oso: Three Healthy Steps	February 14, 2011	Disney Jr. YouTube	Spin-off of Special Agent Oso.
Minnie's Bow-Toons	November 14, 2011	Disney Jr.	Started as a spin-off of Mickey Mouse Clubhouse. The revival is a spin-off of Mickey Mouse Mixed-Up Adventures.
Playing with Skully	September 19, 2012	Disney Jr.	Spin-off of Jake and the Never Land Pirates.
Jake's Never Land Pirate School	November 26, 2012	Disney Jr.	Spin-off of Jake and the Never Land Pirates.
Phineas and Ferb: Doofenshmirtz's Daily Dirt	January 3, 2013	YouTube	Spin-off of Phineas and Ferb
Gravity Falls: Dipper's Guide to the Unexplained	October 14, 2013	Disney Channel	Spin-off of Gravity Falls.
It's a Small World: The Animated Series	November 26, 2013	Disney.com	
Gravity Falls: Mabel's Guide to Life	February 3, 2014	Disney Channel	Spin-off of Gravity Falls.
Gravity Falls: Fixin' It with Soos	April 21, 2014	Disney XD	Spin-off of Gravity Falls.
Gravity Falls: Public Access TV	April 23, 2014	Disney XD	Spin-off of Gravity Falls.
Gravity Falls: Mabel's Scrapbook	June 2, 2014	Disney XD	Spin-off of Gravity Falls.
Jake's Buccaneer Blast	October 26, 2014	Disney Jr.	Spin-off of Jake and the Never Land Pirates in collaboration with The Lego Group.
Gravity Falls: Creepy Letters from Lil' Gideon	November 7, 2014	Disney XD	Spin-off of Gravity Falls
Pilgrim vs. Turkey	November 7, 2014	Disney XD	
Gravity Falls: Old Man McGucket's Conspiracy Corner	April 19, 2015	Disney XD	Spin-off of Gravity Falls featuring puppetry
Future-Worm!: Shorts	May 27, 2015	YouTube	Prequel to Future-Worm!
Two More Eggs	June 23, 2015	Disney XD; YouTube	Variety sketch anthology web series
Gravity Falls: Grunkle Stan's Lost Mystery Shack Interviews	June 28, 2015	Disney XD	Spin-off of Gravity Falls featuring puppetry
Wander Over Yonder: Shorts	July 20, 2015	Disney XD	YouTube
Gravity Falls: 'Pocalypse Preppin'	October 21, 2015	Disney XD	Spin-off of Gravity Falls featuring puppetry.
Gravity Falls Mystery Shack: Shop at Home with Mr. Mystery	November 16, 2016	Disney XD	Spin-off of Gravity Falls featuring puppetry.
It's UnBungalievable	January 15, 2016	Disney Jr.	Spin-off of The Lion Guard in collaboration with Disneynature.
Gravity Falls: Soos' Stan Fiction	February 17, 2017	Disney XD	Spin-off of Gravity Falls
Invade All of the Humans!!!	June 14, 2017	Disney XD; YouTube	Based on Tom and Mark Perrett's original 2012 micro-musical-comedy film of the same name. Collaboration with Disney XD EMEA.
Tangled: Inside the Journal	June 25, 2017	YouTube	
DuckTales: Welcome to Duckburg!	July 9, 2017	YouTube	
Tangled: Short Cuts	July 20, 2017	YouTube	
Elena of Avalor: Adventures in Vallestrella	October 17, 2017	YouTube	
Chip 'N Dale's Nutty Tales	November 13, 2017	YouTube	Spin-off of Mickey Mouse Mixed-Up Adventures.
Elena of Avalor: Scepter Training with Zuzo	February 24, 2018	YouTube	
Star vs. the Forces of Evil Listicle	April 2, 2018	YouTube	
30 Things with DuckTales	May 1, 2018	YouTube	
DuckTales: Webby Reacts	May 8, 2018	YouTube	
DuckTales: The World's Longest Deathtrap!	May 18, 2018	YouTube	
Big Hero 6 The Series: Baymax And..	May 31, 2018	YouTube	
DuckTales: Dewey Dew-Night!	July 8, 2018	YouTube	
Big City Greens: Country Kids In The City	June 4, 2018	YouTube	
Big Hero 6: Baymax Dreams	September 15, 2018	YouTube	Started as a Big Hero 6: The Series spin-off.
Elena of Avalor: The Secret Life of Sirenas	September 21, 2018	YouTube	
Chibi Tiny Tales	November 6, 2018	YouTube	Started as a Big Hero 6: The Series spin-off.
Fancy Nancy: Fancy It Yourself	April 8, 2019	YouTube	
Theme Song Takeover	April 19, 2019	YouTube	
Big Hero 6: The Series: Baymax & Mochi	May 6, 2019	YouTube	
Random Rings	August 25, 2019	YouTube	Started as a Big City Greens spin-off.
Amphibia: Teen Girl in a Frog World	September 3, 2019	YouTube	
Elena of Avalor: Discovering the Magic Within	September 13, 2019	YouTube	
Broken Karaoke	October 7, 2019	YouTube	
Mickey Mouse: Hot Diggity-Dog Tales	October 14, 2019	YouTube	Spin-off of Mickey Mouse Mixed-Up Adventures.
Wild Amphibia	November 13, 2019	YouTube	
Big City Greens Roadtrip	December 15, 2019	YouTube	
The Owl House: Owl Pellets	April 4, 2020	YouTube	
Big City Greens: Miss Tilly's Fun Time TV Minute	May 20, 2020	YouTube	Some shorts used as cross-promotion for Upside Down Magic; Additional shorts were made only for Disney Channel Spain.
Mickey Mornings	June 1, 2020	YouTube	Started as a spin-off of Mickey Mouse Mixed-Up Adventures.
Fancy Nancy: Fancy It Yourself	July 19, 2020	YouTube	
Lip Switch	November 19, 2020	YouTube	
Shake Your Tail with Chip 'n Dale	June 7, 2021	YouTube	Started as a Mickey Mouse Mixed-Up Adventures spin-off.
Amphibia: Vlogs from the Bog	September 1, 2021	YouTube	
Rise Up, Sing Out	February 2, 2022	YouTube	
Disney Animals in The Funhouse	February 8, 2022	YouTube	Spin-off of Mickey Mouse Funhouse; Collaboration with National Geographic Partners
Me & Mickey Vlog	June 27, 2022	YouTube	Started as a Mickey Mouse Mixed-Up Adventures spin-off.
How Not To Draw	September 30, 2022	YouTube	
Zombies: The Re-Animated Series Shorts	July 21, 2023	YouTube	Prequel and spin-off of Zombies: The Re-Animated Series
Moon Girl and Devil Dinosaur: Moon Girl's Lab	June 11, 2024	YouTube	Spin-off of Moon Girl and Devil Dinosaur
A Piece of My Mind	June 27, 2024	YouTube	
Mickey Mouse Funhouse Play Break!	July 15, 2024	YouTube	Spin-off of Mickey Mouse Funhouse
Disney Roadtrip	August 3, 2024	YouTube	
Perry the Platypus Interviews San Diego's Zoo	June 5, 2025	YouTube	Spin-off of Phineas and Ferb. Collaboration with National Geographic Partners
StuGo: Shorts	July 24, 2025	YouTube	Spin-off of StuGo
Cartoonified!	July 26, 2025	YouTube	
Me & Mickey: In the Clubhouse+	July 28, 2025	YouTube	Spin-off of Mickey Mouse Clubhouse+ Sequel of Me & Mickey Vlog.
Disney Recap	December 5, 2025	YouTube	
Phineas and Ferb: Agent P, Under C	January 16, 2026	YouTube	Spin-off of Phineas and Ferb.
Mickey + Bluey	March 21, 2026	YouTube	Co-production with Ludo Studio
Sofia the First: Royal Magic - Magical Friends	May 5, 2026	YouTube	Spin-off of Sofia the First: Royal Magic
Dragon Striker: Meet The Players	May 13, 2026	YouTube	Spin-off of Dragon Striker
Disney Jr. Play Break: Minnie's Bow Toons	June 4, 2026	YouTube	Crossover with SuperKitties
Locker Diaries: Phineas And Ferb	June 6, 2026	TikTok; YouTube Shorts	First vertical short-series from the studio.
The Doomies: Shorts	June 26, 2026	Disney+	Spin-off of The Doomies
Dragon Striker: Gorotama Stars	June 30, 2026	Youtube	Spin-off of Dragon Striker
Mickey’s Country Farm Songs	July 27, 2026	Youtube	Spin-off of Mickey Mouse Clubhouse+

== Feature films and specials ==
=== TV specials ===
#	Title	Release date	Network	Co-production(s)	Notes
1990s
1	Winnie the Pooh and Christmas Too	December 14, 1991	ABC		Spinoff of The New Adventures of Winnie the Pooh; a Christmas special.
2	Goof Troop Christmas: Have Yourself a Goofy Little Christmas	November 26, 1992	Syndication		Spinoff of Goof Troop; a Christmas special.
3	Boo to You Too! Winnie the Pooh	October 25, 1996	CBS		Another spinoff of The New Adventures of Winnie the Pooh; a Halloween special.
4	A Winnie the Pooh Thanksgiving	November 22, 1998	ABC		Another spinoff of The New Adventures of Winnie the Pooh; a Thanksgiving special.
5	Winnie the Pooh: A Valentine for You	February 13, 1999	ABC		Another spinoff of The New Adventures of Winnie the Pooh; a Valentine's Day special.
2010s
6	The O.W.C.A. Files	November 9, 2015	Disney XD		Spin-off of Phineas and Ferb.
7	Duck the Halls: A Mickey Mouse Christmas Special	December 9, 2016	Disney Channel		Spinoff of the 2013 Mickey Mouse TV show.
8	The Scariest Story Ever: A Mickey Mouse Halloween Spooktacular!	October 8, 2017	Disney Channel		Another spinoff of the 2013 Mickey Mouse TV show; prequel to Duck the Halls: A Mickey Mouse Christmas Special.
2020s
9	Shortsgiving With Big City Greens	November 21, 2020	Disney Channel	Liquid Animation	Variety clip show special.
10	Shortstober With Big City Greens	October 30, 2021	Disney Channel	Liquid Animation	Variety clip show special.
11	Spring Shorts-tacular with The Ghost and Molly McGee	May 21, 2022	Disney Channel	Liquid Animation	Variety clip show special.
12	Zombi-Thon With Big City Greens	August 20, 2022	Disney Channel	Liquid Animation	Variety clip show special.
13	Mickey Saves Christmas	November 27, 2022	ABC; Disney Channel; Disney XD; Disney Jr.	Stoopid Buddy Stoodios	Stop motion holiday special. First stop motion animated project from the studio.
14	Shortsmas with Big City Greens	December 3, 2022	Disney Channel	Liquid Animation	Variety clip show special.
15	The Wonderful World of Mickey Mouse: Steamboat Silly	July 28, 2023	Disney+		Series finale to The Wonderful World of Mickey Mouse
16	Summer Shortstacular with Big City Greens	August 12, 2023	Disney Channel	Liquid Animation	Variety clip show special.
17	Hailey Banks' Disney Mini Movie Marathon	March 8, 2024	Disney Channel	Liquid Animation	Variety clip show special.
18	Kiff's Animal Kingdom	April 6, 2024	Disney Channel	Liquid Animation	Variety clip show special.
19	Kiff: The Haunting of Miss McGravy's House	October 5, 2024	Disney Channel	Titmouse, Inc.	
20	Kiff: Lore of the Ring Light	January 21, 2025	Disney Channel	Titmouse, Inc.	
21	Prep & Landing: The Snowball Protocol	November 27, 2025	Disney Channel; Disney+	ICON Creative Studio	Holiday special. Revival of the Prep and Landing series originated at Walt Disney Animation Studios.
22	Mickey Mouse Clubhouse+: Mickey’s Country Farm	July 30, 2026	Disney Jr.	Mikros Animation	
23	Kiff: Scarm II: The Screamwriter	October 6, 2026	Disney Channel	Titmouse, Inc.	
24	A Proud Family Wizmas	November 14, 2026	Disney+	Bar Productions; HouseSpecial	Stop-motion holiday special
Upcoming
25	Kiff: The Oddest Sea	December 1, 2026	Disney Channel	Titmouse, Inc.	
26	Chibiverse: The Doof that Ruined Christmas	December 19, 2026	Disney Channel		
27	Untitled Minnie's Bow Toons: Pet Hotel Summer Special	2027	Disney Jr.	Wild Canary Animation	Spin-off of Minnie's Bow Toons.
28	Mickey Mouse Clubhouse+: Hot Diggity Dog Drive Thru	2027	Disney Jr.	Mikros Animation	
29	Untitled Shorts Spectacular Special	TBA	Disney Channel		Part of Disney Kids & Famly Discovers Voice Talent Search program

=== Television films ===
From 1990 to January 2003, Disney Television Animation had a division, Disney MovieToons/Disney Video Premiere, that produced direct-to-video and theatrical feature films. This unit's operations were transferred to Walt Disney Feature Animation in 2003. See that article for that unit's films.

#	Title	Release date	Network	Co-production(s)	Notes
1980s
1	Fluppy Dogs	November 27, 1986	ABC	N/A	Pilot film.
2	DuckTales: The Treasure of the Golden Suns	September 18, 1987	Syndication	N/A	Film version of the first five episodes of DuckTales.
3	DuckTales: Catch as Cash Can	November 2–5, 1987	Syndication	N/A	Film version of episodes 36-39 of DuckTales season one.
4	DuckTales: Time is Money	November 24, 1988	Syndication	N/A	Film version of the first five episodes of the second season of DuckTales.
5	Super DuckTales	March 26, 1989	NBC	N/A	Film version of the final five episodes of the second season of DuckTales.
6	Chip 'n Dale Rescue Rangers to the Rescue	September 29, 1989	Syndication	N/A	Film version of the first five episodes of the second season of Chip 'n Dale: Rescue Rangers.
1990s
7	TaleSpin: Plunder & Lightning	September 7, 1990	Syndication	N/A	Film version of the first four episodes of TaleSpin.
8	Darkwing Duck: Darkly Dawns the Duck	September 6, 1991	Syndication	N/A	Film version of the first two episodes of Darkwing Duck.
9	Forever Goof	September 5, 1992	Syndication	N/A	Film version of the first two episodes of Goof Troop.
10	Going Bonkers	September 4, 1993	Syndication	N/A	Film version of the first two episodes of Bonkers.
2000s
11	Kim Possible: A Sitch in Time	November 28, 2003	Disney Channel	N/A	Film version of episodes 13-15 of the second season of Kim Possible.
12	Kim Possible Movie: So the Drama	April 8, 2005	Disney Channel	N/A	
13	Leroy & Stitch	June 23, 2006	Disney Channel	Walt Disney Pictures	Series finale of Lilo & Stitch: The Series. It later became a direct-to-video film.
2010s
14	Phineas and Ferb the Movie: Across the 2nd Dimension	August 5, 2011	Disney Channel	N/A	
15	Sofia the First: Once Upon a Princess	November 18, 2012	Disney Jr.	N/A	Pilot to Sofia the First.
16	The Lion Guard: Return of the Roar	November 22, 2015	Disney Channel; Disney Jr.	N/A	Pilot to The Lion Guard.
17	Gravity Falls: Weirdmaggedon	February 29, 2016	Disney XD	N/A	Film version of the final four episodes of the second season of Gravity Falls.
18	Elena and the Secret of Avalor	November 20, 2016	Disney Channel; Disney Jr.	N/A	Pilot to Elena of Avalor. Crossover with Sofia the First.
19	Tangled: Before Ever After	March 10, 2017	Disney Channel	N/A	Pilot to Rapunzel's Tangled Adventure.
20	Star vs. The Forces of Evil: Battle for Mewni	July 15, 2017	Disney XD	N/A	Film version of the first four episodes of the third season of Star vs. The Forces of Evil.
2020s
21	Mickey's Tale of Two Witches	October 7, 2021	Disney Jr.	N/A	Spin-offs of Mickey Mouse Mixed-Up Adventures.
22	Mickey and Minnie Wish Upon a Christmas	December 2, 2021	Disney Jr.	N/A	Spin-offs of Mickey Mouse Mixed-Up Adventures.
23	Big City Greens The Movie: Spacecation	June 6, 2024	Disney Channel	N/A	
Upcoming
24	Untitled "Phineas And Ferb" film	TBA	Disney Channel; Disney+	Surfing Giant Productions	

=== Direct-to-video films ===
#	Title	Release date	Co-production with	Notes
1990s
1	The Return of Jafar	May 20, 1994	Disney Video Premiere	Sequel to Aladdin and pilot to the Aladdin animated series.
2	Gargoyles the Movie: The Heroes Awaken	January 31, 1995		Film version of the first five episodes of Gargoyles.
3	Aladdin and the King of Thieves	August 13, 1996	Disney Video Premiere	Series finale of the Aladdin animated series.
4	Around the World with Timon & Pumbaa	September 12, 1996		Film version of the first seven episodes of The Lion King's Timon & Pumbaa.
5	Mighty Ducks the Movie: The First Face-Off	April 8, 1997		Film version of the first two episodes of Mighty Ducks: The Animated Series.
6	Pooh's Grand Adventure: The Search for Christopher Robin	August 5, 1997	Disney Video Premiere	Series finale The New Adventures of Winnie the Pooh.
7	Jungle Cubs: Born to Be Wild	August 15, 1997		Film version of the first three episodes of Jungle Cubs.
8	Beauty and the Beast: The Enchanted Christmas	November 11, 1997	Disney Video Premiere	Midequel to Beauty and the Beast.
9	Belle's Magical World	February 17, 1998	Disney Video Premiere	Another midequel to Beauty and the Beast.
10	Pocahontas II: Journey to a New World	August 25, 1998	Disney Video Premiere	Sequel to Pocahontas.
11	The Lion King II: Simba's Pride	October 27, 1998	Disney Video Premiere	Sequel to The Lion King.
12	Hercules: Zero to Hero	August 17, 1999		Film version of four episodes of Hercules: The Animated Series.
13	Belle's Tales of Friendship	August 17, 1999		Sequel to Beauty and the Beast: The Enchanted Christmas.
14	Mickey's Once Upon a Christmas	November 9, 1999	Disney Video Premiere	Anthology film.
15	Winnie the Pooh: Seasons of Giving	November 9, 1999	Disney Video Premiere	Anthology film; contains footage from The New Adventures of Winnie the Pooh episode "Groundpiglet Day", the Thanksgiving special A Winnie the Pooh Thanksgiving, and another episode "Find Her, Keep Her".
2000s
16	An Extremely Goofy Movie	February 29, 2000	Disney Video Premiere	Sequel to A Goofy Movie and series finale of Goof Troop.
17	Buzz Lightyear of Star Command: The Adventure Begins	August 8, 2000	Pixar Animation Studios; Walt Disney Pictures	Film version of the first three episodes of Buzz Lightyear of Star Command.
18	The Little Mermaid II: Return to the Sea	September 19, 2000	Disney Video Premiere; Walt Disney Pictures	Sequel to The Little Mermaid.
19	Lady and the Tramp II: Scamp's Adventure	February 27, 2001	Walt Disney Pictures	Sequel to Lady and the Tramp.
20	Mickey's Magical Christmas: Snowed in at the House of Mouse	November 6, 2001	Walt Disney Pictures	Spinoff of House of Mouse; contains three episodes of Mickey Mouse Works "Donald On Ice", "Mickey's Christmas Crisis", and "The Nutcracker" and two Mickey Mouse shorts "Pluto's Christmas Tree" and "Mickey's Christmas Carol".
21	Recess Christmas: Miracle on Third Street	November 6, 2001	Paul & Joe Productions	
22	Cinderella II: Dreams Come True	February 26, 2002	Walt Disney Pictures	Anthology film; indirect sequel to Cinderella.
23	The Hunchback of Notre Dame II	March 19, 2002	Walt Disney Pictures	Sequel to The Hunchback of Notre Dame.
24	Tarzan & Jane	July 23, 2002		Anthology film; sequel to Tarzan.
25	Mickey's House of Villains	September 3, 2002		Spinoff of House of Mouse; contains episodes of Mickey Mouse Works "Mickey's Mechanical House", "How to Haunt a House", "Dance of the Goofys", "Donald's Halloween Scare" and "Hansel and Gretel", one Mickey Mouse short "Lonesome Ghosts", and two Donald Duck shorts "Trick or Treat" and "Donald Duck and the Gorilla".
26	Winnie the Pooh: A Very Merry Pooh Year	November 12, 2002	Walt Disney Pictures	
27	101 Dalmatians II: Patch's London Adventure	January 21, 2003	Walt Disney Pictures	Sequel to One Hundred and One Dalmatians.
28	Atlantis: Milo's Return	May 20, 2003	Walt Disney Pictures	Sequel to Atlantis: The Lost Empire.
29	Stitch! The Movie	August 26, 2003	Walt Disney Pictures	Sequel to Lilo & Stitch and pilot to Lilo & Stitch: The Series.
30	Recess: All Growed Down	December 9, 2003	Paul & Joe Productions	
31	Recess: Taking the Fifth Grade	December 9, 2003	Paul & Joe Productions	Series finale of Recess. Final Direct-to-video film of the studio

=== Theatrical films ===
#	Title	Release date	Director	Writer(s)		Producer(s)	Composer(s)	Co-production with	Animation services	Budget	Gross	RT	MC
#	Title	Release date	Director	Story by	Screenplay by	Producer(s)	Composer(s)	Co-production with	Animation services	Budget	Gross	RT	MC
1	DuckTales the Movie: Treasure of the Lost Lamp	August 3, 1990	Bob Hathcock	Alan Burnett		Bob Hathcock	David Newman	Walt Disney Pictures; Disney MovieToons	Walt Disney Animation France	$20 million	$18.1 million	88%	N/A
2	A Goofy Movie	April 7, 1995	Kevin Lima	Jymn Magon	Jymn Magon; Chris Matheson; Brian Pimental	Dan Rounds	Carter Burwell	Walt Disney Pictures; Disney MovieToons	Walt Disney Animation France; Walt Disney Animation Australia	$18 million	$35.3 million	53%	N/A
3	Doug's 1st Movie	March 26, 1999	Maurice Joyce	Ken Scarborough		Jim Jinkins; David Campbell; Melanie Grisanti; Jack Spillum	Mark Watters	Walt Disney Pictures; Jumbo Pictures	Plus One Animation	$5 million	$19.4 million	20%	N/A
4	The Tigger Movie	February 11, 2000	Jun Falkenstein	Eddie Guzelian	Jun Falkenstein	Cheryl Abood	Harry Gregson-Williams	Walt Disney Pictures; Disney MovieToons	Walt Disney Animation Japan	$15–30 million	$96.2 million	71%	53
5	Recess: School's Out	February 16, 2001	Chuck Sheetz	Joe Ansolabehere; Paul Germain; Jonathan Greenberg	Jonathan Greenberg	Paul Germain; Joe Ansolabehere; Stephen Swofford	Denis M. Hannigan	Walt Disney Pictures; Walt Disney Television Animation Digital Production; Paul & Joe Productions	Sunwoo Animation; Sunwoo Digital International	$23 million	$44.5 million	61%	43
6	Return to Never Land	February 15, 2002	Robin Budd; Co-director: Donovan Cook	Temple Mathews		Christopher Chase; Michelle Pappalardo-Robinson; Dan Rounds	Joel McNeely	Walt Disney Pictures	Walt Disney Animation Australia; Walt Disney Animation Canada; Walt Disney Animation Japan; Cornerstone Animation	$20 million	$109 million	46%	49
7	Teacher's Pet	January 16, 2004	Timothy Björklund	Bill Steinkellner; Cheri Steinkellner		Stephen Swofford	Stephen James Taylor	Walt Disney Pictures	Toon City Animation	$10 million	$6.5 million	76%	74

=== Disney+ original films ===
#	Title	Release date	Director	Writer(s)	Producer(s)	Composer(s)	Co-production with	Animation services	RT	MC	Notes
1	Phineas and Ferb the Movie: Candace Against the Universe	August 28, 2020	Bob Bowen; Supervising director: Dan Povenmire	Dan Povenmire; Jeff "Swampy" Marsh; Jon Colton Barry; Jim Bernstein; Joshua Pruett; Kate Kondell; Jeffrey M. Howard; Bob Bowen	Brandi Young	Danny Jacob	—N/a	Snipple Animation; Yearim Productions; Synergy Animation Studios	100%	77	
2	Superfudge	TBA	TBA	TBA	Anthony Russo; Joe Russo	TBA	AGBO	TBA	TBA	TBA	
3	The School For Sensitive Souls	TBA	TBA	TBA	Gary Marsh	TBA	TBA	TBA	TBA	TBA	
4	Confessions Of An Imaginary Friend	TBA	TBA	TBA	Lisa Fragner	TBA	TBA	TBA	TBA	TBA	Revived adaptation originally acquired by 20th Century Animation.

== Short films ==
#	Title	Release date	Co-production with	Notes
1	Petal to the Metal	August 7, 1992		Released in theaters with 3 Ninjas.
2	Stand by Me	December 22, 1995		Released in theaters with Tom and Huck.
3	The Bug Hunt	1996		
4	Dragon Friend	1997		
5	Redux Riding Hood	August 5, 1997	Toonz Animation Ltd. New Zealand; Disney MovieToons (uncredited)	
6	Three Little Pigs	October 21, 1997		
7	Little Angelita	1999		
8	Grievance of a Starmaker	2002	Walt Disney Studios Home Entertainment	Released only on Walt Disney's It's a Small World of Fun!
9	Gravity Falls: Creature in the Closet	April 17, 2012		
10	The Adventures of Luzu & Manolo	May 31, 2016	Maker Studios	Animated shorts made by various YouTube content creators.
11	Natalia's and Mayden's Vida Loca	May 31, 2016	Maker Studios	Animated shorts made by various YouTube content creators.
12	Eames & Berry	May 31, 2016	Maker Studios	Animated shorts made by various YouTube content creators.
13	Hamburger High	August 5, 2016	Free Period	Animated stop-motion short as part of Disney Channel Original Movies short program.
14	DuckTales: The Lost Key of Tralla La	July 29, 2017	Pebble Studios	Animated 360° short for Disney XD's YouTube.
15	Star vs. The Forces Of Evil: Interdimensional Scavenger Hunt	November 8, 2017	Pebble Studios	Animated 360° short for Disney XD's YouTube.
16	The Ghost and Molly McGee: Scratch Calls The Haunted Mansion	September 25, 2023	Walt Disney Imagineering	Random Rings themed short in collaboration with Walt Disney Imagineering.
18	A Goofy Movie: I2I Immersive VR Experience	April 30, 2025	Cartuna	Animated 360° short for Disney's YouTube.
19	Stitch and Angel's Pop Star Party - Glitter Glide	February 6, 2026		Music video.
20	Disney Villains Nightmares: Ursula’s Voice Is Stolen!	September 24, 2026	DigiToonz	

== Miscellaneous work ==
Title	Year	Notes
Epcot World Showcase Adventure	2009–2012 (as Kim Possible World Showcase Adventure); 2012–2020 (as Agent P's World Showcase Adventure); 2022–present (as DuckTales World Showcase Adventure)	Theme park scavenger hunt based on different series including Kim Possible, Phineas and Ferb, and DuckTales.
Future-Worm!: Breaking News! That Hasn't Broken Yet!	2015	Animated commercials featuring Future-Worm! characters promoting the Disney XD's 2015 slate of the studio, did special promos for Lucasfilm Animation and It's A Laugh Productions shows like Lab Rats,Mighty Men, Gamer's Guide to Pretty Much Everything and Star Wars Rebels and a promo for BBC Studios Dr Who.
Gravity Falls: Between the Pines	2016	Behind-the-scenes special celebrating the series finale of Gravity Falls.
Disney XD Meets The Haunted Mansion	2016	Halloween themed stop-motion commercials of various characters of Star vs. the Forces of Evil,Pickle and Peanut, DuckTales and Big Hero 6: The Series interacting with The Haunted Mansion IP.
Gravity Falls: Farewell to the Falls	2016	Art gallery from Gallery Nucleus to celebrate the Gravity Falls series finale "Weirdmageddon 3: Take Back The Falls"; Provided Gravity Falls production art.
Star Vs The Forces Of Evil: Star Fan Live Stream	2016	Disney XD's Facebook VTuber live stream to celebrate the Star vs. the Forces of Evil premiere of "Bon Bon the Birthday Clown".
Star vs. the Forces of Evil: #MarcoLive	2017	Disney XD's YouTube VTuber live stream to celebrate the Star vs. the Forces of Evil season 2B premiere.
Star vs. the Forces of Evil: Turn Off Your Phone PSA	2017	Turn off your phone PSA with Star vs. the Forces of Evil characters screened in select theaters alongside Warner Animation Group's The Lego Batman Movie, Walt Disney Pictures' Beauty and the Beast, DreamWorks Animation's The Boss Baby, and Columbia Pictures and Sony Pictures Animation's Smurfs: The Lost Village.
Star vs. the Forces of Evil Tribute Exhibition	2017	Art gallery from Gallery Nucleus to celebrate Star vs. the Forces of Evil. Provided Star Vs. the Forces of Evil production art.
Star vs. the Forces of Evil: #StarLive with Star and Marco	2017	Disney XD's YouTube VTuber live stream to celebrate the premiere of Star vs. the Forces of Evil: "The Battle of Mewni".
DuckTales: Turn Off Your Phone PSA	2017	Turn off your phone PSA with DuckTales characters screened in select theaters alongside Pixar's Cars 3, Illumination's Despicable Me 3, and Columbia Pictures and Sony Pictures Animation's The Emoji Movie.
Star vs. the Forces of Evil: Marco Scary Stories	2017	Disney XD's Halloween-themed YouTube VTuber live stream featuring Star vs. the Forces of Evil characters.
Be Inspired: Disney Citizenship - Share the Joy Holiday Ads	2017	Stop-motion Christmas themed commercials featuring Star vs. the Forces of Evil, DuckTales and Big Hero 6: The Series characters at Walt Disney World's Cinderella Castle as part of a campaign for Toys for Tots.
"Fly"	2018	Music video for the song by Marshmello featuring DuckTales characters.
Radio Disney Music Awards 2018	2018	Provided animations featuring DuckTales characters during the ceremony.
Star vs. the Forces of Evil: Blood Moon Ball - A Farewell to Mewni	2019	Art gallery from Gallery Nucleus to celebrate the premiere of the Star vs. the Forces of Evil's series finale "Cleaved". Provided Star vs. the Forces of Evil production art.
Internet Safety with Mickey Mouse	2019	Childnet International Internet safety PSA featuring Mickey Mouse for Disney Junior EMEA.
Mickey & Minnie's Runaway Railway	2020	Theme park attraction. Provided original short "The Perfect Picnic".
Mickey Shorts Theater	2020	Theme park attraction. Provided original short "Vacation Fun".
Mickey Shorts Theater: Photo Op	2020	Mickey Shorts Theater photo op section inspired by different Mickey Mouse episodes.
Disney Channel Stars - Put the Happy in the Holidays	2020	Provided animation of Cricket Green for the music video.
This Duckburg Life	2021	Podcast. Spin-off of the DuckTales reboot.
Aqua-Mouse	2022	Disney Wish cruise attraction.
Walt Disney World Passholder Magnets	2022	Collaboration with Walt Disney Imagineering and Disney Yellow Two Shoes Team; Provides several redesings and animations of Walt Disney Animation Studios, Pixar Animation Studios, The Muppets Studio and Walt Disney Imagineering characters for the magnets.
The Art of Amphibia: Exhibition & Fan Celebration	2022	Art gallery from Gallery Nucleus to celebrate Amphibia's series finale ""All In" and "The Hardest Thing"". Provided Amphibia production art.
The Art of The Owl House - Exhibition / Fan Celebration	2022	Art gallery from Gallery Nucleus to celebrate The Owl House's premiere of "Thanks to Them". Provided The Owl House production art.
The Art of DuckTales	2022	Artbook by Dark Horse Comics; Provided archived production artwork of DuckTales for the book.
Broken Karaoke: Ways We Feel Anxious	2022	National Alliance on Mental Illness PSA featuring characters from Big City Greens, Phineas and Ferb, Amphibia, and The Ghost and Molly McGee throughout the Broken Karaoke short series.
Reimagine Tomorrow: Black History Month Interstitial Interviews	2023	Black History Month themed interstitial interviews for Disney Channel with different community people and Disney Kids & Family actors hosted by Moon Girl and Devil Dinosaur characters.
Reimagine Tomorrow: International Women's History Month Interstitial Interviews	2023	International Women's History Month themed interstitial interviews for Disney Channel with different community people and Disney Kids & Family actors hosted by Big City Greens characters.
Random Rings: Cricket Calls the National Hockey League!	2023	Random Rings cross-promotion short for "The NHL Big City Greens Classic".
The NHL Big City Greens Classic	2023	Simulcast ESPN broadcast of the New York Rangers hockey game themed around Big City Greens. First collaboration with ESPN Edge Innovation Center.
Chibi Tiny Tales: Happy Birthday Disney Channel	2023	Animated short in commemoration of Disney Channel's 40th anniversary featuring characters from the studio as well characters from shows and films from It's a Laugh Productions and Disney Channel Original Movies within the Chibi Tiny Tales short series.
Chibi Tiny Tales: Happy Pride From Disney Channel	2023	Animated short in commemoration of Pride Month featuring characters of the studio including Kim Possible, Phineas and Ferb, Gravity Falls, Big City Greens, Amphibia, The Owl House, The Ghost and Molly McGee, The Proud Family: Louder and Prouder, Kiff, and Hailey's On It! as well characters from live action shows and films from It's a Laugh Productions and Disney Channel Original Movies like Descendants, Zombies, and That's So Raven within the Chibi Tiny Tales short series.
Random Rings: Cricket Green and Gramma Alice Call the National Hockey League!	2024	Random Rings cross-promotion short for "The NHL Big City Greens Classic 2".
The NHL Big City Greens Classic 2	2024	Second edition of the simulcast ESPN broadcast of the New York Rangers hockey game themed around Big City Greens; Collaboration with ESPN Edge Innovation Center.
Aqua Mouse: Curse of the Golden Egg	2024	Disney Treasure cruise attraction
The Art of Amphibia	2025	Art Book by TOKYOPOP; Provided archived production artwork of Amphibia for the book.
Aqua Mouse: Villain Mountain	2025	Disney Destiny cruise attraction.
Fortnite x Phineas and Ferb	2026	Collaboration with Epic Games.
The Art of Gravity Falls	2026	Art Book by Disney Hyperion; Provided archived production artwork of Gravity Falls for the book.

=== Other credits ===
Title	Production company	Year	Notes
Gargoyles: Comics	CreatureComics; Joe Books; Dynamite Entertainment; Disney Comics	2006–2008 (Creature Comics run); 2016–2017 (Joe Books); 2023–present (Dynamite Entertainment run)	Based on Gargoyles properties and characters by.
Darkwing Duck: Comics	BOOM! Studios; Joe Books; Dynamite Entertainment; Disney Comics	2010–2011 (BOOM! Studios run); 2016 (Joe Books run); 2023–present (Dynamite Entertainment run)	Based on Darkwing Duck properties and characters by.
Shark Tank: Episode 426	MGM Television; Sony Pictures Television Studios	2013	Dr. Heinz Doofenshmirtz Special Thanks.
Gravity Falls: Dipper's and Mabel's Guide to Mystery and Nonstop Fun!	Disney Publishing Worldwide	2014	Based on Gravity Falls properties and characters by.
Gravity Falls: Journal 3	Disney Publishing Worldwide	2016	Based on Gravity Falls properties and characters by.
Gravity Falls: Dipper and Mabel and the Curse of the Time Pirates' Treasure!: Select Your Own Choose-Venture	Disney Publishing Worldwide	2016	Based on Gravity Falls properties and characters by.
Star Vs. The Forces Of Evil: Deep Trouble	Joe Books; Disney Comics	2016	Based on Star Vs. The Forces Of Evil properties and characters by.
Star and Marco's Guide to Mastering Every Dimension	Disney Publishing Worldwide	2017	Based on Star Vs. The Forces Of Evil properties and characters by.
DuckTales: Comics	IDW Publishing; Disney Comics	2017	Based on DuckTales properties and characters by.
Rapunzel's Tangled Adventure: Comics	IDW Publishing; Disney Comics	2017	Based on Rapunzel's Tangled Adventure properties and characters by.
Rapunzel's Tangled Adventure: Rapunzel and the Lost Lagoon	Disney Publishing Worldwide	2017	Based on Rapunzel's Tangled Adventure properties and characters by.
Rapunzel's Tangled Adventure: Rapunzel's Guide to All Things Brave, Creative, and Fun!	Disney Publishing Worldwide	2017	Based on Rapunzel's Tangled Adventure properties and characters by.
Gravity Falls: Don't Color This Book! It's Cursed!	Disney Publishing Worldwide	2017	Based on Gravity Falls properties and characters by.
One Crazy Summer: A Look Back at Gravity Falls	Shout Factory	2018	Gravity Falls footage courtesy of.
Gravity Falls: The Hirsch Twins	Shout Factory	2018	Gravity Falls footage courtesy of.
DuckTales: Solving Mysteries and Rewriting History!	Disney Publishing Worldwide	2018	Based on DuckTales properties and characters by.
Star vs. the Forces of Evil: The Magic Book of Spells	Disney Publishing Worldwide	2018	Based on Star Vs. The Forces Of Evil properties and characters by.
Rapunzel's Tangled Adventure: Rapunzel and the Vanishing Village	Disney Publishing Worldwide	2018	Based on Rapunzel's Tangled Adventure properties and characters by.
Gravity Falls: Lost Legends	Disney Publishing Worldwide	2018	Based on Gravity Falls properties and characters by.
Kim Possible	Middleton Productions; Disney Channel Original Movies	2019	Based on Kim Possible properties and characters by.
Big Hero 6: The Series Comics	IDW Publishing; Disney Comics	2019	Based on Big Hero 6: The Series properties and characters by.
One Day At Disney: Jose Zelaya - Character Designer	Disney Publishing Worldwide; Endeavor Content	2020	Recess, Lilo & Stitch: The Series, The Lion Guard, Mickey Mouse Mixed-Up Adventures footage courtesy of.
Disney Insider	Disney Television Studios	2020	Mickey & Minnie's Runaway Railway, Mickey Mouse Funhouse, Alice's Wonderland Bakery, Big City Greens footage courtesy of.
Black Widow	Marvel Studios	2021	DuckTales footage courtesy of.
Big Hero 6: The Series: The Manga	Yen Press; Disney Manga; Disney Publishing Worldwide	2021	Based on Big Hero 6: The Series properties and characters by.
Tangled: The Rise of Flynn Rider	Disney Publishing Worldwide	2021	Lance Strongbow Special Thanks.
Disney Magic Bake-Off: Big City Greens	Disney Branded Television; Tastemade	2021	Based on Big City Greens properties and characters by.
The Simpsons: Bart's in Jail!	20th Television Animation; Gracie Films	2021	Bill Cipher Special Thanks.
Chip 'n Dale: Rescue Rangers	Walt Disney Pictures; Mandeville Films	2022	Based on Rescue Rangers properties and characters by. Chip 'n Dale: Rescue Rangers footage courtesy of.
Atlanta: The Goof Who Sat By the Door	FXP	2022	A Goofy Movie footage courtesy of.
Mickey: The Story of a Mouse	Disney Original Documentary; Tremolo Productions	2022	Mickey Mouse footage courtesy of.
Amphibia: Marcy's Journal	TOKYPOP; Disney Manga; Disney Publishing Worldwide	2022	Based on Amphibia properties and characters by.
Toontown: Goofy's How-to-Play Yard	Walt Disney Imagineering	2023	Mickey's Toontown attraction where it features artwork featuring Peg Pete, Pistol Pete, Peter Pete, Jr and Max Goof from Goof Troop and Webby Vanderquack in her DuckTales 2017 version as well small nods to A Goofy Movie.
Created by Craig McCracken! - Nucleus	Gallery Nucleus	2023	Wander Over Yonder production art courtesy of.
Gargoyles: Dark Ages	Dynamite Entertainment; Disney Comics	2023	Based on Gargoyles properties and characters by.
San Fransokyo Makers Market Gift Shop	Walt Disney Imagineering	2023	Disney's California Adventure gift shop featuring merchandise and poster artwork based on Big Hero 6: The Series.
Pencils Vs Pixels	Strike Back Studios; Hideout Pictures	2023	Gravity Falls, Sofia The First, Milo Murphy's Law footage courtesy of.
Darkwing Duck: NegaDuck	Dynamite Entertainment; Disney Comics	2023	Based on Darkwing Duck properties and characters by.
Gargoyles Halloween	Dynamite Entertainment; Disney Comics	2023	Based on Gargoyles properties and characters by.
Dashing Through the Snow	Walt Disney Pictures; Will Packer Productions; Smart Entertainment	2023	Rise Up, Sing Out footage courtesy of.
Darkwing Duck: Justice Ducks	Dynamite Entertainment; Disney Comics	2024	Based on Darkwing Duck properties and characters by.
Gargoyles Quest	Dynamite Entertainment; Disney Comics	2024	Based on Gargoyles properties and characters by.
The Walt Disney Company: Your Vote Matters	The Walt Disney Company	2024	A Goofy Movie, Mickey Mouse Works, House Of Mouse footage courtesy of.
Moon Girl and Devil Dinosaur: Wreck and Roll	Scholastic; Disney Publishing Worldwide; Marvel Entertainment	2024	Based on Moon Girl and Devil Dinosaur properties and characters by.
Gravity Falls: The Book of Bill	Disney Publishing Worldwide	2024	Based on Gravity Falls properties and characters by.
DuckTales (1987): Comics	Dynamite Entertainment; Disney Comics	2024	Based on DuckTales properties and characters by.
Gargoyles Winter Special	Dynamite Entertainment; Disney Comics	2024	Based on Gargoyles properties and characters by.
Not Just A Goof	CNEK Films	2025	Goof Troop, DuckTales the Movie: Treasure of the Lost Lamp, A Goofy Movie footage courtesy of.
Gargoyles Meets Fantastic Four	Marvel Comics; Dynamite Entertainment; Disney Comics	2025	Based on Gargoyles properties and characters by.
Gargoyles Demona	Dynamite Entertainment; Disney Comics	2025	Based on Gargoyles properties and characters by.
Gargoyles Winter Special 2	Dynamite Entertainment; Disney Comics	2025	Based on Gargoyles properties and characters by.
Phineas And Ferb: A-MAZE-ing Creature Double Feature	Disney Publishing Worldwide; Papercutz	2025	Based on Phineas And Ferb properties and characters by.
Gargoyles Meets Darkwing Duck	Dynamite Entertainment; Disney Comics	2026	Based on Gargoyles and Darkwing Duck properties and characters by.
DuckTales: Valentines Day Special	Dynamite Entertainment; Disney Comics	2026	Based on DuckTales properties and characters by.
Ted: The Sword in the Stoned	Fuzzy Door Productions; Universal Content Productions; MRC	2026	Adventures of the Gummi Bears Theme Song courtesy of.
TaleSpin: Comics	Dynamite Entertainment; Disney Comics	2026	Based on TaleSpin properties and characters by
The Owl House: The Long-Lived King	Disney Publishing Worldwide	2026	Based on The Owl House properties and characters by.
Gargoyles Winter Special 3	Dynamite Entertainment; Disney Comics	2026	Based on Gargoyles properties and characters by.
Amphibia: Strange Voyage	TOKYPOP; Disney Manga; Disney Publishing Worldwide	2027	Based on Amphibia properties and characters by.
Phineas And Ferb: Star Wars	Papercutz; Lucasfilm Publishing	2027	Based on the special of the same name Based on Phineas And Ferb properties and characters by
Lilo & Stitch 2	Walt Disney Pictures; Rideback	2028	Based on Angel properties and characters by.

== See also ==
- List of Pixar television series
- DreamWorks Animation Television
