= List of Pickle and Peanut episodes =

The following is a list of episodes from the TV series Pickle and Peanut.

== Series overview ==
Season	Segments	Episodes	Originally released	
Season	Segments	Episodes	First released	Last released
1	40	21	September 7, 2015	October 10, 2016
2	42	21	October 23, 2017	January 20, 2018

== Episodes ==
=== Season 1 (2015–16) ===
No.	Title	Directed by	Written and storyboarded by	Original release date	Prod. code	Viewers (millions)
1	"Greg"	Noah Z. Jones & Joel Trussell	Noah Z. Jones & Joel Trussell	September 7, 2015	101	0.34
1	"Gramma Jail"	Noah Z. Jones, Joel Trussell & Ken Wong	Noah Z. Jones & Joel Trussell	September 7, 2015	101	0.34
Pickle and Peanut lend their new pimple friend, Greg, to frenemy Lazer, in hopes of landing an invitation to his cool party. Note: This episode was aired as a preview on September 2, 2015 and is the only episode with animation services from Mercury Filmworks. Pickle and Peanut accidentally land Mam Mams (voiced by Michael Croner), an old lady, in an old lady jail after violating an express lane rule in Mjärt Mart saying only ten items or less can be checked out at once, because Mam Mams checked out an eleventh item, so Pickle and Peanut must go to the jail and rescue her.
2	"Cart Rustlers"	Ken Wong	Noah Z. Jones, Joel Trussell, Benny Crouse, Greg Sharp & Ivan Dixon	September 14, 2015	102	0.25
2	"Swim Lessons"	Ken Wong	Noah Z. Jones, Joel Trussell & Ed Skudder	September 14, 2015	102	0.25
The boys go on a stakeout to uncover the mystery of the missing shopping carts and come face-to-face with notorious cart rustler Bloodbeard. Peanut discovers that Pickle never learned to swim and takes him to the local pool for lessons. Meanwhile, Peanut falls in love with the swimming lesson instructor, to which he is later teamed up with Wayne.
3	"Pickle the Falcon Master"	Ken Wong	Kimberly A. Roberson & Jacob Sluka	September 21, 2015	103	0.42
3	"Pickle Adopts a Family"	John Aoshima & Ken Wong	Kimberly A. Roberson	September 21, 2015	103	0.42
Pickle wants a falcon so he can join the local falconry club, but Peanut acquires a parakeet from Sneaky Patty (voiced by Abbi Jacobson) instead. Both are later challenged to a falcon battle with Wayne. Pickle is excited to win a family of creatures as a cereal box prize, but the creatures start multiplying rapidly and prove too much for Pickle and Peanut to handle.
4	"PAL-SCAN"	Ken Wong	Benny Crouse	September 28, 2015	104	0.42
4	"America's Sweetboy"	John Aoshima	Benny Crouse, John Mathot, Michael Bertino & M.J. Sandhe	September 28, 2015	104	0.42
Pickle and Peanut accidentally break Mjärt Mart's new automated checkout machine, the PAL-SCAN, but they brought the machine back to life after fixing it. Peanut enters Pickle in a local mall contest to find the new face of America's Sweetboy Taffy.
5	"Gory Agnes"	Ken Wong	Noah Z. Jones, Joel Trussell, Ken Wong & Ryan Quincy	October 5, 2015	105	0.32
5	"Haunted Couch"	John Aoshima & Ken Wong	M.J. Sandhe	October 5, 2015	105	0.32
Pickle and Peanut's friendship is tested when they conjure up the terrifying ghostly ghoul, Gory Agnes, and Pickle begins dating her. After accidentally breaking Pickle's couch, the boys purchase a new one from Couch Dracula's but soon discover that the replacement couch is cursed.
6	"Body Spray"	Ken Wong	Benny Crouse & Jacob Sluka	October 19, 2015	106	0.31
6	"Luxury Car Service"	John Aoshima & Ken Wong	Benny Crouse & M.J. Sandhe	October 19, 2015	106	0.31
Pickle and Peanut cannot afford a bottle of the body spray they are fixated on so they make their own. The boys are desperate to buy a pair of the cool Turkey Wrap Headphones made by their favorite rapper D-Stixx, so they start a car service to earn extra money. Rapper Kool Keith guest stars as D-Stixx.
7	"Cookie Racket"	Ken Wong	Ryan Gillis & Sunil Hall	October 26, 2015	107	0.45
7	"Busted Arm"	Ken Wong	Reza Iman	October 26, 2015	107	0.45
When Pickle bakes his grandma's delicious cookies for the neighbors, a troupe of little girls called the Sugar Bees compete with the boys to defend their turf. Pickle's cast earns him some newfound popularity, so Peanut fakes a broken limb to get some attention.
8	"Pigfoot"	Ken Wong	Ryan Gillis & Giovanny Cardenas	November 9, 2015	108	0.29
8	"Tae Kwon Bro"	John Aoshima & Ken Wong	Victor Courtright & Ed Skudder	November 9, 2015	108	0.29
The boys find "Pigfoot" – a portmanteau of a pig and Bigfoot – while (painfully) playing paintball with McSweats. Pickle and Peanut visit Lazer's karate class, but Peanut is horrible at it, while Pickle is great at it. However, when a herd of goats wreak havoc (and the boys find out that the karate class is a fake), Pickle and Peanut must save the day.
9	"A Cabbage Day Miracle"	Sunil Hall & John Aoshima	Ryan Gillis, Nate Cash, Benny Crouse & M.J. Sandhe	November 30, 2015	110	0.26
9	"Springtime for Christmas"	Sunil Hall	Sunil Hall & M.J. Sandhe	November 30, 2015	110	0.26
9	"Yellow Snow"	Ken Wong	Joe Horne, Ryan Gillis, Victor Courtright & Ken Wong	November 30, 2015	110	0.26
The boys, unhappy that Christmas is over, start a new holiday: "Cabbage Day". The boys turn Christmas time back into springtime. The boys have a snowball fight and find a "yellow snowball" that is set on wrecking the town.
10	"Sewer Shark"	Ken Wong	Benny Crouse, Ryan Gillis & M.J. Sandhe	November 16, 2015	109	0.33
The boys find a shark in the sewers and are eaten by it.
11	"Bee Colony"	John Aoshima	Noam Sussman & Victor Courtright	January 25, 2016	111	0.34
11	"The Goose's Juice"	Sunil Hall & John Aoshima	Ryan Gillis	January 25, 2016	111	0.34
Pickle goes on vacation with his family and puts Peanut in charge of his bees. Pickle loses sleep over the relentlessly barking dog next door.
12	"Wiz Fest"	Ken Wong	Benny Crouse	February 1, 2016	112	0.34
12	"Gym Rats"	Ken Wong	Victor Courtright	February 1, 2016	112	0.34
Peanut attends a renaissance faire hosted at the Pizza Slop. Pickle and Peanut get teased at the local Y.
13	"90's Adventure Bear"	Ken Wong	Benny Crouse	February 8, 2016	113	0.32
13	"Parking Lot Carnival"	Sunil Hall	Ryan Gillis	February 22, 2016	113	0.47
Pickle and Peanut find their favorite cartoon character at a yard sale. Shaquille O'Neal guest stars as 90's Adventure Bear. Pickle loses one of his shoes on a carnival ride.
14	"Volcano"	Ken Wong & Andrew Overtoom	Victor Courtright & Reza Iman	March 7, 2016	114	0.30
14	"Bike Jumper"	Ken Wong & Andrew Overtoom	Victor Courtright & Reza Iman	March 14, 2016	114	0.48
A big volcano is about to erupt. SuperTubu star, Bike Jumper, breaks his leg after Pickle suggests a dangerous jump.
15	"Francine"	Sunil Hall	Ryan Gillis	March 21, 2016	115	0.36
15	"Cell Phone Tree"	Ken Wong	Victor Courtright & Reza Iman	April 4, 2016	115	0.32
McSweats' girlfriend Francine breaks up with him, so Pickle and Peanut try their hand at couple counseling. Pickle and Peanut make a cell phone tree their own hut.
16	"Sneaky Patty Sleepover"	Sunil Hall	Benny Crouse & Ryan Gillis	April 11, 2016	116	0.23
16	"Baby Tooth"	Andrew Overtoom & Ken Wong	Victor Courtright, Ryan Gillis, M.J. Sandhe & Benny Crouse	April 18, 2016	116	0.26
Sneaky Patty hides out the night at Pickle's house. After losing his last baby tooth, Pickle sprouts a full grown beard.
17	"Bats"	Sunil Hall	Benny Crouse	June 20, 2016	117	0.30
17	"Movie Camp Out"	Sunil Hall	Ryan Gillis	June 20, 2016	117	0.30
Pickle and Peanut's van becomes infested with bats. Pickle and Peanut camp out overnight in the mall to catch the first showing of a new movie.
18	"Night Shift"	Sunil Hall	Ryan Gillis	June 27, 2016	119	N/A
18	"Scalped"	Sunil Hall	Ryan Gillis	June 27, 2016	119	N/A
Pickle and Peanut volunteer to work all night stocking the shelves at Mjärt Mart. The boys buy scalped tickets to go see Pickle's favorite band.
19	"What Lies Beneath"	Ken Wong	Benny Crouse	July 18, 2016	118	0.34
19	"The Rat King Moves In"	Ken Wong	Marianna Hersko, Benny Crouse & Ryan Gillis	July 18, 2016	118	0.34
Pickle and Peanut dig up the carpet at Pickle's house and discover something fun and destructive. Peanut and the Rat King trade places.
20	"Australia"	Sunil Hall	Victor Courtright, Benny Crouse & Ryan Gillis	July 25, 2016	120	0.39
When Peanut's uncle's uncle leaves him an inheritance, he and Pickle must cross the Australian Outback in order to retrieve.
21	"Trick or Treat"	Ken Wong, Joel Trussell & Noah Z. Jones	Ed Skudder, Ryan Gillis, Sunil Hall & Kim Roberson	October 10, 2016	121	0.29
The boys get busted for Lazer for a trick-or-treating like little kids.

=== Season 2 (2017–18) ===
No. overall	No. in season	Title	Directed by	Written by	Storyboarded by	Original release date	Prod. code	Viewers (millions)
22	1	"Huge Reward"	Ryan Gillis	Greg Grabianski	Victor Courtright	October 23, 2017	203	0.07
22	1	"Bear-I-Cade"	Sunil Hall	Ryan Gillis	Ryan Gillis	October 23, 2017	203	0.07
L'il Pickle goes missing, so Pickle and Peanut set up fliers around town with a huge reward, which just happens to catch the attention of some eager mercenaries. The boys are excited for the big weekend they planned together but it is ruined when a bear wounds up at Peanut's house and they become barricaded inside the van.
23	2	"Camp"	Sunil Hall	Michele Cavin	Drew Applegate	October 23, 2017	212	0.07
23	2	"Freeway Island"	Ryan Gillis & Sunil Hall	W.G. Tonner	Alex Cline, Victor Courtright & David Gemmil	October 23, 2017	212	0.07
McSweats brings Pickle and Peanut to his old summer camp, he never got a chance to be a legendary camper by stealing an item from the girl camp across the lake, so they decide to intrude on a hellish girl slumber party hosted by Pickle's ex-girlfriend Gory Agnes to fulfil McSweats' summer camp prophecy. After the boys crash on an "island" in the middle of the freeway, they try to find a way off the island that takes what they believe to be 18 years.
24	3	"Wet Wedding"	Sunil Hall	Jim Martin & Brendon Walsh	Ben Crouse	October 24, 2017	208	N/A
24	3	"Tweenage Lupinus"	Ryan Gillis	Greg Grabianski	Drew Applegate	October 24, 2017	208	N/A
Pickle and Peanut attend 90's Adventure Bear's boat wedding and when they knock the captain of the ship unconscious it is up to them to get 90's Adventure Bear married. Pickle convinces Peanut that he has been turned into a werewolf and he has to do everything he can to make Peanut's powers seem believable. However, things take a turn for the worse when a real werewolf shows up.
25	4	"Candy Factory"	Sunil Hall	Greg Grabianski & Victor Courtright	Victor Courtright	October 25, 2017	TBA	0.06
25	4	"Funwagon"	Ryan Gillis	Andy Rocco Kraft	Megan Fisher	October 25, 2017	TBA	0.06
After discovering that an old candy bar in the back of the store shelves contains a coveted golden ticket that grants an exclusive tour of a marvelous candy factory, Pickle convinces Peanut to go with him to claim his prize and give Peanut a taste of some of the factory's chocolate, only to discover that the factory has been long abandoned, the employees are now hobos living in the factory's ruins, and the owner of the factory has been missing for years. Pickle and Peanut are forced by Laser to wash his prized sports car "Funwagon" after they unintentionally splash it with mud. However, they accidentally hose the car down with some toxic ooze from a nearby truck instead of water, and as a result, the ooze grants Funwagon mutated sentience and a freakish face, which ultimately causes a horrified Laser to disown the vehicle. The two befriend Funwagon and decide to "raise it" as their own, until Laser has a "change of heart" and decides to take back Funwagon in order to enter it into a demolition derby for a $10,000 cash prize, which causes Pickle and Peanut to go after Laser in the truck that contained the toxic ooze to begin with in order to rescue Funwagon from being demolished.
26	5	"Chalk Graffiti"	Sunil Hall	Michele Cavin	Ben Crouse	October 26, 2017	TBA	N/A
26	5	"Birthday at Wayne's"	Ryan Gillis	Sam Riegel	Phylicia Fuentes	October 26, 2017	TBA	N/A
Mr. Mjärt calls for Pickle and Peanut's help to remove some graffiti from behind the Mjärt Mart. The boys are stunned to see how real the graffiti looks, and that it is made out of chalk. They then notice a man named TX made it, who was hiding behind some bushes watching them. The boys encourage TX to spread his chalk art around town, but he is too nervous that people would not appreciate it, until they actually do. TX would bring out his true creativity if it was not for the fact that his father is Papa, and he wants his son to be as a criminal as he is. Papa threatens to take away TX's chalk if he cannot prove that he has what it takes to rob a bank. Pickle and Peanut take TX to a credit union, but it does not go as planned, so they get the idea to make a mural of the wall broken into. The wall does not fool Papa, but it fools some dimwitted cops, and they decide to take TX and make him part of the police force to help them prank other precincts in exchange for "cop gold", and Papa is happy to know that he has someone to gain some intel from inside the police force. When Wayne invites Pickle and Peanut to his birthday party, Peanut is astonished to see that Zander Divine, Nevada’s Foremost Outer Space Magician will be performing at the party. The two then go to Wayne's house and they notice that Zander is not going to be there. Before they leave, Pickle goes to grab some cake only to see that Wayne is crying in a corner. Pickle decides to bring Wayne with them to see Zander's show in person but Peanut has his doubts until Wayne eventually proves him wrong. Though at the show, the two notice that all Wayne wanted was for his revenge against Zander, so they try to stop him before he causes any real damage.
27	6	"Mobile Aquarium"	Sunil Hall	Greg Grabianski	Phylicia Fuentes	October 27, 2017	TBA	0.06
27	6	"Shaving Primate Ryan"	Ryan Gillis & Sunil Hall	Jim Martin	Louis Morton	October 27, 2017	TBA	0.06
Pickle has been training lobsters in the Mjärt Mart and Peanut finds this to be very cool, suggesting that Pickle should just purchase the lobsters so they do not get eaten. Pickle says they are too expensive to buy so the boys borrow the lobsters and turn the van into a mobile aquarium. Pickle starts to perform shows with the lobsters in hopes to raise enough money until rapper D-Stixx offers the boys $15,000 for them to perform at Shellapalooza. Pickle and Peanut then realize that D-Stixx just wants to eat the lobsters and they proceed to rescue the lobsters and set them free before they are eaten. After Pickle makes a complaint to the health department about hair being on the Slop Shop's pizza, the health department takes the owner Ryan away. With people entering the restaurant and no one to make the pizzas, the boys decide to give people premade pizzas. A group of kids then burst into the restaurant and soon there is no pizza left. Pickle tries to make pizzas to make up for the missing ones but doesn't now, enraging the kids as they hold the customers captive while Pickle and Peanut go to free Ryan from the health department. It is then revealed that the health department has been looking for Ryan for years because he's half orangutan.
28	7	"Runaway Train"	Ryan Gillis	Greg Grabianski	Ben Crouse	October 30, 2017	TBA	N/A
28	7	"Cop Car Graveyard"	Sunil Hall	Michele Cavin	Alex Cline	October 30, 2017	TBA	N/A
After Lazer mocks McSweats for reenacting his childhood idol, Li'l Chugger the Face Train, Peanut and Pickle give his train costume an upgrade.
29	8	"Fast Food Pirates"	Sunil Hall	Brendon Walsh	Ben Crouse	October 31, 2017	TBA	N/A
29	8	"The Drone"	Ryan Gillis	Greg Grabianski	Megan Fisher	October 31, 2017	TBA	N/A
After Pickle and Peanut do not receive a toy in their Meaty Buns meal, they soon discover that the company does not want to give out the toys for mysterious reasons. Pickle and Peanut then become an anonymous group called the Dark Jester, going from franchise to franchise and stealing boxes of the condemned toys to give out at the East Reno Park to the children who did not receive them. Pickle and Peanut are given a cat drone from Big Dook at the thrift store, where they start to have fun with it and use it for good around town, though it soon crashes into Wayne's backyard guarded by killer animals. The boys then discover a group of kids who have been in hiding from Wayne and Peanut gets the idea to fight back against Wayne and take back what's theirs.
30	9	"Truckers"	Ryan Gillis	Greg Grabianski	Victor Courtright	November 1, 2017	TBA	N/A
30	9	"Pickledog"	Sunil Hall	Victor Courtright	Victor Courtright	November 1, 2017	TBA	N/A
After the Mjärt Mart sells out of frozen turkeys on Thanksgiving Day, Mr. Mjärt sends Pickle and Peanut on a delivery errand to fetch more.
31	10	"Watchin' Darlin'"	Sunil Hall	Michele Cavin	Alex Cline	November 2, 2017	TBA	N/A
31	10	"Petting Zoo"	Ryan Gillis	Rob Kurnut	Alex Cline	November 2, 2017	TBA	N/A
After Pickle and Peanut agree to take care of McSweats' beloved dog Darlin' while he takes a "spa day", Pickle discovers that for some reason the dog likes Peanut more than him, causing Pickle to do everything he can think of to make Darlin' like him.
32	11	"The Merrytime Fellas"	Ryan Gillis	Greg Grabianski	Alex Cline	November 3, 2017	TBA	N/A
32	11	"Foot Bangers"	Sunil Hall	Greg Grabianski	Victor Courtright	November 3, 2017	TBA	N/A
Peanut forms a musical group with Lazer. Pickle loses his sneakers to McSweats and must win a deadly footrace to get them back.
33	12	"Little Olden Town"	Ryan Gillis	Scott Sonneborn, Michele Cavin & Greg Grabianski	Victor Courtright	November 6, 2017	TBA	N/A
33	12	"90's Adventure Bear and the Sword of Songs"	Ryan Gillis	Scott Sonneborn	Ben Crouse	November 6, 2017	TBA	N/A
Pickle and Peanut try to save Mr. Mjärt's village from a puma. A brand new episode of 90s Adventure Bear where 90s Adventure Bear must save his good friend Yuk Yuk from the evil Major Manslaughter. Note: This is the first episode of the series where Pickle and Peanut do not appear.
34	13	"Magic Dragon"	Sunil Hall	Michele Cavin	Drew Applegate	November 7, 2017	TBA	N/A
34	13	"Sync or Swim"	Sunil Hall	Michele Cavin	Tim Rauch, Aaron Whitaker & Alex Cline	November 7, 2017	TBA	N/A
Pickle and Peanut free a magical dragon and try to help him find a true friend who will not make him abuse his powers. The Sugar Bees try to sabotage Peanut's synchronized swimming team before a big competition.
35	14	"Preschool Reunion"	Sunil Hall	Greg Grabianski	Alex Cline	November 8, 2017	TBA	N/A
35	14	"Bobsledders"	Ryan Gillis	Greg Grabianski	Abbey Luck	November 8, 2017	TBA	N/A
At their preschool reunion, the gang reminisces about the time they discovered a sand elf living in the playground sandbox. After learning that L'il Pickle has contracted terminal hiccups, the boys join Lazer's bobsledding team to raise money for the cure.
36	15	"Fugitives"	Ryan Gillis	Greg Grabianski	Sean Glaze & Victor Courtright	November 9, 2017	TBA	N/A
36	15	"Granny's House"	Ryan Gillis	Greg Grabianski	Tayla Perper & Drew Applegate	November 9, 2017	TBA	N/A
McSweats frames Pickle and Peanut when he flushes his father's jewelry down the toilet. The health inspector threatens to destroy Peanut's grandma's house when he learns there are too many cats living there.
37	16	"Gregazoids"	Sunil Hall	Greg Grabianski	Ben Crouse	November 10, 2017	TBA	N/A
37	16	"Meat Ballers"	Sunil Hall	Greg Grabianski	Abbey Luck	November 10, 2017	TBA	N/A
Peanut finds his childhood collection of Gregazoids and searches for the final figure he needs to collect them all. Pickle and Peanut turn their van into a food truck to sell some meat before it expires and they lose their jobs.
38	17	"Tree Lighting"	Ryan Gillis	Michele Cavin	Ben Crouse	December 2, 2017	TBA	N/A
38	17	"A Merry Mo-Cap Musical"	Sunil Hall	Alex Cline	Alex Cline & Kevin Bailey	December 2, 2017	TBA	N/A
Pickle and Peanut find out that Scampy is practicing for a show with his brothers Umbrella and Crab Meat. They drive to Scampy and his brothers across the country to see the Christmas tree lighting in New York City.
39	18	"Chain Wallet"	Sunil Hall	Brendon Walsh	Drew Applegate	January 20, 2018	TBA	0.19
39	18	"Tails of East Reno"	Ryan Gillis	Michele Cavin	Alex Cline	January 20, 2018	TBA	0.19
Peanut comes across a cool biker chain wallet in the Mjärt Mart and takes it for himself, until they are invited to a biker party with the owner hosting and the boys have to figure out how to escape without being noticed by the killer biker. Pickle tries to get a worm back to health, McSweats tries to find a new dog toy for his dog Darlin', Dr. Pamplemousse is late for his important date with his lady friend, and Sneaky Patty has to do some sneaky deliveries.
40	19	"Black Light Bowling"	Ryan Gillis	Michele Cavin	Victor Courtright	January 20, 2018	TBA	0.13
40	19	"90's Adventure Bear and the Coconut Helmet"	Sunil Hall	Greg Grabianski	Ben Crouse	January 20, 2018	TBA	0.13
Peanut is anxious to get a third strike to get the bowling ally's black lights to come on, he uses the help of Wayne but the owner Ragga will not turn on the lights. Peanut flicks on the lights himself and it opens a portal to the underworld where they are trapped unless they can beat Wayne's demon brother in a bowling match. In another new episode of 90's Adventure Bear, 90's tries to help his father 70's Adventure Bear search for the fabled Coconut Helmet he's been looking for his entire life, even with some help from Major Manslaughter until they're inevitably double crossed.
41	20	"Fishy Biz"	Ryan Gillis	Greg Grabianski	Abbey Luck & Drew Applegate	January 20, 2018	TBA	0.16
41	20	"Sign Spinners"	Ryan Gillis & Sunil Hall	Greg Grabianski	Sean Glaze & Kevin Bailey	January 20, 2018	TBA	0.16
Peanut must fill in for Sadie, the aquarium's information kiosk lady (who is actually a mermaid) while Pickle takes her out on a date. The Mjärt Mart falls on hard times so Pickle and Peanut become sign spinners to drum up some business.
42	21	"Bonus Track"	Sunil Hall	Michele Cavin	Drew Applegate	January 20, 2018	TBA	0.14
42	21	"Clip Show"	Ryan Gillis	Michele Cavin	Drew Applegate	January 20, 2018	TBA	0.14
Pickle and Peanut learn that their favorite album contains a bonus track and try desperately to hear it. Pickle and Peanut host a clip show telethon to raise money for Pickle's boneless cat charity.
