= Future-Worm! =

Animated series

- Genre: Comic science fiction Adventure
- Created by: Ryan Quincy
- Directed by: Pete Michels; Dan O'Connor; Mike Morris; Scott O'Brien; Dave Thomas; Shaun Cashman
- Voices of: Andy Milonakis; James Adomian; Jessica DiCicco; Ryan Quincy; Melanie Lynskey
- Narrated by: Corey Burton
- Theme music composer: Darian Sahanaja
- Composer: Darian Sahanaja
- Country of origin: United States
- Original language: English
- No. of seasons: 1
- No. of episodes: 21 (60 segments)

Production
- Executive producer: Ryan Quincy
- Editor: Charles T. Jones
- Running time: 22 minutes
- Production companies: Disney Television Animation; Bento Box Entertainment; Quincy Productions

Original release
- Network: Disney XD
- Release: August 1, 2016 – May 19, 2018

Related
- Out There

Future-Worm! is an American comic science fiction animated television series created by Ryan Quincy, who previously created IFC's Out There, for Disney XD. The show features the adventures of Danny and Future-Worm, who time travel by using a lunch box-shaped time machine.

After a series of shorts, the full show premiered on August 1, 2016 and ended on May 19, 2018.

On June 29, 2018, Disney XD announced the cancellation of Future-Worm! after one season.

== Plot ==
The show follows Danny Douglas, a 12-year-old boy who, after inventing a time machine lunch box, sends it back in time. However, it was knocked out into the future as future scientists discover it. Because of its small size, the scientists use a worm and transform it into Future-Worm, a worm with a Photo Receptor Visor, Titanium Reinforced Abs and a Bullet-Proof Beard. He travels back to Danny's timeline as the boy meets the worm, and agrees to befriend him. Danny's life eventually changes forever as he has the coolest adventures, head into the past, present and future, meet new recruits, and seek the help of their friend Bug.

== Characters ==
=== Main ===
- Danny Douglas (voiced by Andy Milonakis) is a boy who invents the Time Machine Lunch Box. He joins Future-Worm on many adventures.
- Future-Worm (voiced by James Adomian) is a futuristic worm (nicknamed Fyootch) who has a photo receptor visor, titanium reinforced abs, and a bullet-proof beard. Future-Worm is Danny's best friend, and the worm helps out on Danny's quests.
- Bug (voiced by Jessica DiCicco) is a purple-haired girl with wings.
- Robo-Carp (voiced by Ryan Quincy) is a fish-shaped robot who, every time Danny uses him, only explodes thus making him useless. When he fails, Danny and Future-Worm usually say, "Weak!".

=== Recurring ===
- Doug Douglas (voiced by Ryan Quincy) is Danny's father.
- Megan Douglas (voiced by Melanie Lynskey) is Danny's mother.
- Steak Starbolt (voiced by Jonathan Frakes) is the star of his own show who is also Danny's favorite hero.
- Narrator (voiced by Corey Burton) is the unseen narrator who narrates the show and even names the different devices that Danny and Future-Worm use.
- Future Danny (voiced by Paul Williams) is Danny's older future self.
- Neil deGrasse Tyson (voiced by himself) is the guy who knows everything about science, who is also telepathic.
- Madeline is a time traveling girl from the Victorian past.

=== Villains ===
- Gloopies are spineless alien creatures who loathe Captain Cakerz. Their weakness is the crunch of the cereal.
- Anchovy Monster is a monstrous anchovy who seeks revenge on Future-Worm, who betrayed it due to the fact that he dislikes anchovies.

== Production ==
The characters first appeared in Disney XD's 2015 lineup. A series of shorts premiered later that same year.

Disney originally greenlighted the show to premiere somewhere in the fall of 2015, but Pickle and Peanut placed its debut following its official premiere on September 2, 2015, pushing Future-Worm! to premiere on August 1, 2016.

The series was created by Ryan Quincy, who previously created the short-lived animated series Out There on IFC, and was a former animation director for South Park.

Animation was provided by Titmouse, Inc., who also made other Disney XD shows: Motorcity, Randy Cunningham: 9th Grade Ninja and, for the animation for animated characters, Kirby Buckets.

== Episodes ==
=== Series overview ===
Season	Episodes	Originally released	
Season	Episodes	First released	Last released
Shorts	5	May 27, 2015	June 11, 2015
Series	21 (60)	August 1, 2016	May 19, 2018

=== Series (2016–18) ===
- Episodes are usually 22 minutes long: the first segment is eleven minutes long, the second segment runs three to seven minutes, and the third runs three to seven minutes.

No.	Title	Directed by	Written by	Storyboarded by	Original release date	Prod. code	U.S. viewers (millions)
1	"Long Live Captain Cakerz!"	Pete Michels	Story by : Ryan Quincy; Written by : Ryan Quincy and Dave Tennant	Bryan L. Francis and Ethan Hegge	August 1, 2016	101a	0.33
Danny's attempt to watch his favorite show Steak Starbolt while eating his favorite cereal, Captain Cakerz, is interrupted when the breakfast cereal is out of stock, so he travels back to get them. However, he and Future-Worm figure out who stole the cereal — an alien race called Gloopies, which the citizens end up as their slaves, including Danny's parents. But to save them, Danny and Fyootch uses help from their friend Bug and a special guest as well as boxes of Cakerz. Guest stars: Neil deGrasse Tyson as himself
2	"Terrible Tuber Trouble"	Pete Michels	John Bailey Owen	Ethan Hegge, Erik A. Kuska, and Mike Morris	August 1, 2016	101c	0.33
Danny uses a future chemistry set he just obtained in order to make an anniversary dinner for his parents upon them cashing in their favor coupon. This experiment ends up creating a mashed potato monster.Guest stars: Justin Roiland as Professor Gigglesnorp
3	"Healin' Touch with Dr. D"	Pete Michels	Story by : Craig Lewis; Written by : Nick Confalone	Ethan Hegge	August 1, 2016	101b	0.33
Upon Danny getting brain freeze after drinking a slushie, Future-Worm takes him to the year 3,000 where he ends up on a medical TV show called Healin' Touch with Dr. D where the titular doctor is a Tyrannosaurus.
4	"How to Beat a Cold... With Fists!"	Pete Michels	Todd Casey	Ethan Hegge and Branden Warren	August 8, 2016	102a	0.31
Danny has a highly contagious cold and cannot go to the latest Steak Starbolt convention. He then accidentally creates a giant cold monster while his dad faces his fear of germs.
5	"Old Man Duck Head"	Pete Michels	Nick Confalone	Ethan Hegge and Mike Morris	August 8, 2016	102c	0.31
Danny and Future-Worm laugh at an old man as a duck is on his head. But Future-Worm knows that laughing too hard can never make you laugh again, so he and Danny travel back to see if it's true. This was interrupted as the duck-head man is elected president.
6	"Unsolved Histories"	Scott O'Brien	Nick Confalone	Scott O'Brien	August 8, 2016	102b	0.31
On "Unsolved Histories," Baxter Frost talks about how Danny and Fyootch change time when they can't afford a burrito on Columbus Day. As the Time Machine Lunch Box knocks out in 1492, the year Christopher Columbus first discovered America, the man closes down stores for the day! But the duo change his name to Christopher Burrito in order to get burritos.
7	"Meetiversary"	Pete Michels	Nick Confalone	Bryan L. Francis and Erica Hayes	August 15, 2016	103a	0.19
Future-Worm forgets to get Danny a gift. When they go to outer space, they discover that scientists have turned into werewolves.
8	"Steak Starbot"	Pete Michels	Brian Wysol	Mike Morris	August 15, 2016	103b	0.19
Steak Starbolt is too busy fighting giant robots and monsters, with his crew thinking he is dead.
9	"The Very Hungry Killah-Pillah"	Pete Michels	Todd Casey	Ethan Hegge and Mike Morris	August 15, 2016	103c	0.19
Bug creates a "truck-o-sarus" and she and the boys must tame it, yet that it metamorphosizes into a truck butterfly.
10	"Bubble Dad"	Pete Michels	Story by : Ryan Quincy; Written by : Todd Casey and Brian Wysol	David SanAngelo and Brandon Warren	August 22, 2016	104a	0.21
Danny creates a hermetically-sealed bubble for his dad when they show up at camp.
11	"Porthole to the Lizard"	Pete Michels	Todd Casey	Vaughn Tada	August 22, 2016	104b	0.21
Danny finds himself in detention and must escape in order to see a Komodo dragon.
12	"Future Danny and the Ghost Pirates of Tau Ceti"	Pete Michels	Todd Casey	Riccardo Durante	August 22, 2016	104c	0.21
Future Danny finds himself captured by pirate ghosts.
13	"Deunited"	Pete Michels	Michele Cavin	David SanAngelo and Brandon Warren	August 29, 2016	105a	0.25
With Danny at his aunt's house, Fyootch spends the day with Bug when doing a cheese explosion. However, Future-Worm is kidnapped by birds.
14	"The Forever Five"	Pete Michels	Story by : Julia Prescott; Written by : Todd Casey	Mike Morris and Eric McConnell	August 29, 2016	105b	0.25
After Megan creates her latest invention, the Forever Five, she, Danny, and Fyootch are teleported to a world where everything is gray and its inhabitants are depressed, by a sad princess who wants to use Megan's invention to make her subjects happy. Guest star: Chelsea Peretti as Ennuisha
15	"Great Debates with the End of Time"	Pete Michels	Nick Confalone	Mark Ackland	August 29, 2016	105c	0.25
Fyootch and Danny fight to see what animal it is: either a fish or a pig. Guest star: Ron Funches as The End of Time
16	"The Bleak Shall Inherit the Earth"	Pete Michels	John Bailey Owen	David SanAngelo, Brandon Warren and Rufino Roy Camacho II	September 19, 2016	106a	0.20
Danny wanted to be the biggest fan of rock band Titanium White until he and Fyootch visit an alternative timeline. Guest star: Jeff Ross
17	"Makin' History"	Pete Michels	John Bailey Owen	Vaughn Tada	September 19, 2016	106b	0.20
Danny brings a lobster boy for a school project, and later teaches him how to play football.
18	"Lobster Boy Movie Trailer"	Pete Michels	John Bailey Owen	Ethan Hegge	September 19, 2016	106c	0.20
Lobster Boy dreams of becoming part of the school's football team in a fake movie trailer.
19	"Go Help Yourself"	Pete Michels	Nick Confalone	Mike Morris and Eric McConnell	October 3, 2016	107a	0.15
Future-Worm leaves Danny to do one last job for a friend.
20	"Barl"	Pete Michels	Brian Wysol	Erica Hayes, Bryan L. Francis and Rufino Roy Camacho II	October 3, 2016	107b	0.15
Future-Worm and Danny go on a road trip with Barl.
21	"Mecha-Muck Wars"	Pete Michels	Ryan Quincy	Dan O'Connor	October 3, 2016	107c	0.15
Fyootch leads an army of rebellions.
22	"Revenge of the Anchovy Monster"	Pete Michels	Nick Confalone	David SanAngelo and Brandon Warren	October 10, 2016	108a	0.16
The anchovy monster again seeks revenge on Danny and Fyootch.
23	"Food Goggles"	Pete Michels	Brian Wysol	Vaughn Tada	October 10, 2016	108b	0.16
Danny invents "food goggles", which makes everything taste good.
24	"Steak Starbolt Spooktacular"	Pete Michels	Brian Wysol and Todd Casey	Travis Blaise	October 10, 2016	108c	0.16
Steak Starbolt thinks he is stuck inside a TV when doing a public service announcement.
25	"Robo-Carp-Alypse"	Mike Morris	Todd Casey	Bryan L. Francis and Eric McConnell	October 17, 2016	109a	0.30
Danny's exploding Robo-Carps return as zombies.
26	"The Reemen"	Pete Michels	Brian Wysol	Erica Hayes and Bryan L. Francis	October 17, 2016	109b	0.30
Terrifying creatures invade Danny's house.
27	"Dr. D, Ghost Hunter"	Pete Michels	Adam Colás and Nick Confalone	Bryan L. Francis and Mike Morris	October 17, 2016	109c	0.30
Dr. D becomes a ghost hunter.
28	"Steak Starmom"	Pete Michels	Brian Wysol	Brandon Warren, David SanAngelo and Travis Blaise	October 24, 2016	110a	0.18
When Danny and Fyootch get sucked into the Steak Starbolt virtual reality game, Danny's mom Megan accidentally gets sucked in as well.
29	"Lemonade's Last Stand"	Pete Michels	Nick Confalone	Vaughn Tada, Eric McConnell and Dan O'Connor	October 24, 2016	110b	0.18
The duo open up a lemonade stand in a future with no lemons. Guest star: Selma Blair as Execavator Angrits.
30	"This Week in Future Science"	Pete Michels	Todd Casey	Dan O'Connor	October 24, 2016	110c	0.18
The future scientists (who created Future-Worm) also create more abominations of nature.
31	"The Time Travelers Council"	Pete Michels	Todd Casey	Bryan L. Francis and Travis Blaise	November 7, 2016	111a	0.16
Danny travels back in an attempt to prevent himself from being grounded.
32	"Future Danny and the Scourge of the Plierates"	Pete Michels	John Bailey Owen	Erica Hayes	November 7, 2016	111b	0.16
The Plierates' ritual is interrupted by Future Danny.
33	"Bug's Very Important Job"	Pete Michels	John Bailey Owen and Todd Casey	Brandon Warren	November 7, 2016	111c	0.16
Future Danny is paid for a visit to Bug.
34	"Bug vs. the Babysitter"	Pete Michels	Michele Cavin	Dan O'Connor	November 14, 2016	112a	0.20
Bug tries many ways to ditch Zoe, her babysitter. Guest star: Lo Mutac (Note: Credited as Charlyne Yi) as Zoe
35	"Doug Race: 3939"	Dave Thomas	Nick Confalone	Dave Thomas	November 14, 2016	112b	0.20
Danny's newest invention ensues chaos when it is tested on his dad.
36	"The Panama Bananama"	Pete Michels	Michele Cavin	Douglas McCarthy	November 14, 2016	112c	0.20
The boys visit Danny's aunt Bitsy, when she was young. Guest star: Noel Wells as Young Aunt Bitsy
37	"Future-Worm and the 54 Days of Snordfest"	Dan O'Connor	Nick Confalone	Brandon Warren and Travis Blaise	December 12, 2016	113a	0.21
Embarrassed by his role in a future-holiday movie, Future-Worm travels to the real Snordfest to make sure it never happens.
38	"Lost in the Mall"	Dan O'Connor	Todd Casey	Brandon Warren, Travis Blaise and Rufino Roy Camacho II	December 12, 2016	113b	0.21
The family accidentally leaves Doug at the mall while Christmas shopping; when they go back for him, they discover a sinister plan afoot in Santa's Village. Guest star: Paget Brewster as Mrs. Claus
39	"Devil on Bug's Shoulder"	Pete Michels	Todd Casey and Brian Wysol	Mike Morris and Douglas McCarthy	June 19, 2017	114a	0.14
Bug uses a coupon to get an adventurous sidekick of her own.
40	"Assassin Parrot"	Pete Michels	John Bailey Owen	Vaughn Tada	June 19, 2017	114b	0.14
Danny gets a pet parrot that turns out to be a time-traveling assassin robot.
41	"The Never-Ending End of Time"	Pete Michels	Michele Cavin	Erica Hayes	June 19, 2017	114c	0.14
Danny and Fyootch's End of Time debate continues.
42	"Egg in the Family"	Pete Michels	Adam Colás	Bryan L. Francis, Douglas McCarthy and Travis Blaise	June 20, 2017	115a	0.17
Ruby and Paco "babysit" an egg for a class project.
43	"The Right to Bear Arms"	Pete Michels	Brian Wysol	Brandon Warren and Steven Umbleby	June 20, 2017	115b	0.17
Fyootch grows a pair of bear claws to enter a wrestling contest.
44	"This Week in Future Science 2"	Shaun Cashman	John Baliey Owen	Arielle Yett	June 20, 2017	115c	0.17
Brad and Rad genetically engineer a cool Horseshoe Crab.
45	"Danny Swap: The Musical"	Dan O'Connor	Todd Casey and John Bailey Owen	Brandon Warren and Eric McConnell	June 21, 2017	116a	0.15
Danny swaps places with Future Danny.
46	"The World According to Larp"	Dan O'Connor	Adam Colás	Rufio Roy Camacho II, Todd Jacobsen, Aaron Joseph Paetz and Arielle Rosenstein	June 21, 2017	116b	0.15
When Danny gives Presto the future-magic-wand, the bad guy becomes more of a bad guy.
47	"Mecha-Muck Wars 2"	Dan O'Connor	Ryan Quincy	Todd Jacobsen, Aaron Joseph Paetz, and Arielle Rosenstien	June 21, 2017	116c	0.15
Future-Worm learns the price of sacrifice again. Guest star: Bill Nye as himself
48	"O Brother, Here Art Thou"	Mike Morris	Nick Confalone	Douglas McCarthy	June 22, 2017	117a	0.10
A wedge comes between Danny and Future-Worm.
49	"Life With Barl"	Pete Michels	Todd Casey and Michele Cavin	Aaron Batara and Phil Jacobson	June 22, 2017	117b	0.10
Barl moves into the Douglas' shed.
50	"Fyootch Fails"	Pete Michels	Adam Colás	Mike Morris	June 22, 2017	117c	0.10
Fyootch tries to stop the production of an embarrassing future TV show called Top Ten Future-Worm Fails.
51	"Megan Muck Wars"	Pete Michels	Ryan Quincy and John Bailey Owen	Arielle Yett and Bryan L. Francis	May 5, 2018	118a	0.13
Future-Worm attempts to prevent the Mecha-Muck Wars.
52	"Porthole to the Spider Hole"	Pete Michels	Michele Cavin	Angelo Hatgistavrou and Arielle Yett	May 5, 2018	118b	0.13
Bug must learn to overcome her fear of spiders.
53	"Weenie Genie"	Pete Michels	Michele Cavin	Travis Blaise	May 5, 2018	118c	0.13
Danny and Fyootch order a magical hot dog. Guest star: Jack McBrayer as Weenie Genie
54	"Be Mine Across Time"	Dan O'Connor	Michele Cavin	Brandon Warren	May 12, 2018	119a	0.11
Danny and Fyootch's time travel road trip is put on hold when Fyootch begins dating a cave woman named Ooga.
55	"Fyootchy Swap"	Dan O'Connor	Brian Wysol	Rufino Roy Camacho II	May 12, 2018	119b	0.11
Mr. Larzid takes over Fyootch's body in an attempt to get Danny to join the Gem Force Five.
56	"Steak Starbolt Movie Trailer"	Pete Michels	Todd Casey and Brian Wysol	Douglas McCarthy and Mike Morris	May 12, 2018	119c	0.11
A trailer for the Steak Starbolt movie in which Steak must impersonate the President of the United States to stop an assassination plot by his brother.
57	"Manchovy Prison Break"	Mike Morris	Nick Confalone	Arielle Yett and Mike Morris	May 19, 2018	120a	0.12
Future-Worm and Danny reluctantly team up with Manchovy to break him out of prison so that they can protect his gem stash from Future Granny Danny.
58	"Wrong Place, Wrong Time"	Pete Michels	Adam Colás	Phil Jacobsen	May 19, 2018	120b	0.12
Clock Face mistakenly attends a villain's meeting where Future Granny Danny reveals her plan to use the 99 Gems of Mystery and Space on a wish to destroy all timelines except her own.
59	"Future Danny Finale"	Pete Michels	John Bailey Owen	Douglas McCarthy; Arielle Yett	May 19, 2018	120c	0.12
After once again escaping from the clutches of the Plierates, Future Danny settles in for some relaxation only to be captured by Future Granny Danny.
60	"Finale"	Pete Michels	Todd Casey	Arielle Yett	May 19, 2018	121	0.11
Future Granny Danny's minions lay siege to the city searching for the final gem and find it inside the engine of Hank Flappington, Bug's pet robot. Bug, tired of being left behind for all of Danny's time travel adventures, decides to take matters into her own hands and takes the lunch box to confront Future Granny Danny on her own but is easily overpowered and imprisoned. Danny and Fyootch use the Time Deer to travel to Future Granny Danny's lair but are too late to stop her from retrieving the 99th gem. A Gem Genie appears and reveals there is a hundredth gem and since not all have been collected he will only grant the half of the wish about destroying all timelines. As the universe begins to be destroyed by a giant black hole the final gem is revealed to the one Fyootch wears around his neck. Danny uses the final gem to make his own wish to go back to before he gave Hank Flappington a gem engine at the cost of his memories of past adventures. In the end, the universe is back to normal but Danny has inadvertently created a time loop as he is transported back to the beginning of “Long Live Captain Cakerz!”. Note: This episode has cameo appearances of characters from other Disney XD original series, including Star vs. the Forces of Evil, Pickle and Peanut, Wander Over Yonder and Gravity Falls.
