= Electric City (web series) =

2012 American animated web series

- Genre: Post-apocalyptic; Science fiction
- Created by: Tom Hanks
- Directed by: Joel Trussell
- Starring: Tom Hanks; Holland Taylor; Jeanne Tripplehorn; Ginnifer Goodwin; Jason Antoon; Chris Parnell; Joey Kern; Paul Scheer; June Diane Raphael; Georg Stanford Brown
- Composers: Leo Z Ali Noori
- Country of origin: United States
- Original language: English
- No. of seasons: 1
- No. of episodes: 20

Production
- Executive producers: Gary Goetzman; Amitabh Jhunjhunwala
- Producers: Bo Stevenson; Josh Feldman
- Editor: Tony Christopherson
- Running time: 4–7 minutes
- Production companies: Reliance Entertainment; Playtone; 6 Point Harness

Original release
- Network: Yahoo! Screen
- Release: July 17, 2012

Electric City is an American animated post-apocalyptic science fiction web series created by Tom Hanks for Yahoo! Screen. It was released July 17, 2012 and for now contains 20 short episodes totaling 90 minutes in length. The series stars the voices of Hanks, Holland Taylor, Jeanne Tripplehorn, Ginnifer Goodwin, Jason Antoon, Chris Parnell, Joey Kern, Paul Scheer, June Diane Raphael, and Georg Stanford Brown. The series begins after the world has ended. Electric City represents peace and security in the midst of rubble. Even though it seems to be an orderly utopia, there are still secrets, back-alley dealings, daring chases and murder.

== Production ==
Tom Hanks, Josh Feldman, and Bo Stevenson, all of whom voice characters, began writing Electric City in 2003 without necessarily intending it as a web series. Tom Hanks wrote the first story on an Olivetti Lettera 22 typewriter. Tom Hanks said that during development the idea was worked and reworked at Playtone, Hanks' production company, without a production or distribution plan until Yahoo! purchased the distribution.

Animation services for Electric City were provided by 6 Point Harness in Los Angeles under the direction of Joel Trussell.

== Plot ==
It's the first project in what we call online digital blockbusters. This is new for Yahoo and new for the Internet — this is maiden territory.

— Erin McPherson, Yahoo! Vice President

In a post-apocalyptic setting, mankind is reduced to small settlements whose main business is to produce electric power. With fossil and nuclear fuel sources mostly depleted, the communities are dependent on naturally created electricity, be it by air, water, or muscle power (the latter of which is used as a punishment for criminals and other undesirables of this society). Under the motto "All in service to all" everyone must contribute to society's welfare.

Electric City is actually a collective name for several geographically separated precincts. Central cultural and social administration takes place at Central Stations. Other precincts include:

- Nerima, the site of Electric City's water purification facilities and of the Camera Obscura observatory, the meeting place of the "knitting society".
- Greenlight, where the city's first university is located.
- Morningside, the most modern precinct and residential area.
- The Mines, a mining and manufacturing district.
- The Agricultural Territories, the main food provider for the city.
- The Outside, an unsettled off-limits territory lining the coast near Electric City, which is inhabited by fugitives from the persecution by the "knitting society".

The precincts' main connection is by their power cables and a wired radio service, but free communication, trading, and traveling has been made illegal, since it entails the wasting of precious electrical power reserves as well as the gradual loss of influence for the "knitting society", a matriarchal group of war survivors who founded Electric City and are ruthlessly trying to maintain their power base. The Tap Coders, an underground movement of free-thinkers trying to circumvent the current social restrictions by establishing an illegal communications network, especially present a considerable thorn which they seek to eliminate.

== Episodes ==
No.	Title	Directed by	Written by	Original release date
1	"Truth or Consequences"	Joel Trussell	Unknown	July 17, 2012
2	"The Voice of the City"	Joel Trussell	Unknown	July 17, 2012
3	"Survivors"	Joel Trussell	Unknown	July 17, 2012
4	"Young Daughter or God"	Joel Trussell	Unknown	July 17, 2012
5	"We're Social Animals"	Joel Trussell	Unknown	July 17, 2012
6	"All in Service to All"	Joel Trussell	Unknown	July 17, 2012
7	"What Aren't We Capable Of?"	Joel Trussell	Unknown	July 17, 2012
8	"The Time Has Come"	Joel Trussell	Unknown	July 17, 2012
9	"The Saddest of Reasons"	Joel Trussell	Unknown	July 17, 2012
10	"Never the Two Shall Meet"	Joel Trussell	Unknown	July 17, 2012
11	"Necessary to Hide"	Joel Trussell	Unknown	July 18, 2012
12	"Lost Souls"	Joel Trussell	Unknown	July 18, 2012
13	"Lorenzo Seventeen"	Joel Trussell	Unknown	July 18, 2012
14	"Trail of Dead Bodies"	Joel Trussell	Unknown	July 18, 2012
15	"Strategic Casualties"	Joel Trussell	Unknown	July 18, 2012
16	"No One Is Untraceable"	Joel Trussell	Unknown	July 19, 2012
17	"People Like a Good Show"	Joel Trussell	Unknown	July 19, 2012
18	"The Outside"	Joel Trussell	Unknown	July 19, 2012
19	"Such Beauty From a Box"	Joel Trussell	Unknown	July 19, 2012
20	"Illumination Night"	Joel Trussell	Unknown	July 19, 2012

== Technology ==
There appears to be a limited use of technology in this new society, wood seems to be the primary construction material instead of metal or plastic. Also firearms appear to be absent. Some conveniences are shown, such as electric light and electric heat. There are no horses or other pack animals, but bulk transportation appears to be available by freighter boats that traverse the canals. The Skytrain appears to be a crude electric tram system that runs on an elevated suspended cable. The Walking Post delivers interpersonal communication, but it seems to be of limited use, and does not carry parcels. The Wire Service is a form of radio that is broadcast to sets that are hardwired into the main studio at Wire Central. Electricity is generated through several sources, but the city is powered down overnight to conserve energy, except for the Wire Service. Citizens are discouraged for and punished if they are found to be tapping off of the Wire Service power supply. The use of recording wire is also seen, a technology that largely disappeared in the 1950s with the advent of magnetic tape. A newspaper is published called The Daylight, but it appears only in the old "broadside" format, posted in kiosks in town squares and no subscribers or single issues sold.

An encampment on The Outside is shown to have a full library of vinyl records, as well as stereo players, supposedly salvaged from "the lost cities".

== Geography ==
Little is known about the actual location of Electric City, though some references have been made to the "swollen lakes" which could be a reference to the Great Lakes, which could place Electric City somewhere in Michigan or Wisconsin, or somewhere in the American Midwest.

== Cast of characters ==
- Cleveland Carr (formerly Lorenzo Seventeen) (Tom Hanks): The main protagonist. He was formerly a team leader of the AMP (Allied Municipal Patrol) but was stripped of his old life and identity due to a tragic accident during a mission, and was recruited by the "knitting society" as a grid operative and assassin for Ruth Orwell. Though originally unquestioningly loyal, he begins to harbor doubts following his meeting Hope and his assignment to assassinate Richard Jacobs.
- Ruth Orwell (Holland Taylor): An elder lady and childhood survivor of the apocalyptic war which reduced humanity to its current state. She is a member of the matriarchal founding group of Electric City, nicknamed the "knitting society". She is also Carr's immediate superior.
- Mrs. Emerson (Lindsey Stoddart): A member of Electric City's founding council.
- Mrs. Zelaski (Edith Fields): Founder of the "knitting society".
- Hope Chatsworth (Jeanne Tripplehorn): A popular young anchorwoman for the radio news station Wire 6, iconically called "Voice of the City". Eventually, she becomes Cleveland's girlfriend.
- Frank Deetleman (Joey Kern): Hope's technician colleague at Wire 6, and secretly also a Tap Coder activist.
- Roger Moore (Tara Sands): A young boy and Youth Auxiliary member who spies on the code transmissions of the Tap Coders for the AMP.
- Gladys Elba (Kristin Klabunde): A member of the Electric City YX (Youth Auxiliary), and a friend of Roger Moore. She usually serves tea to the "knitting society".
- Garrison "Knobs" Butler (Jason Antoon): A small-time crook who makes a living in selling illegal radio listening sets to civilians. Knobs is later forced to serve Carr as his underground G-man.
- Dr. Loman (David Kaye): Head of the revolutionary forces.
- Makaela (Tara Strong): Assistant to Dr. Loman.
- Biff (Josh Feldman): A member of the revolutionary movement, and Happ's partner. He is killed by Cleveland via electrocution during an arrest attempt.
- Happ (Bo Stevenson): A member of the revolutionary movement, and Biff's partner. Happ is killed by Cleveland via electrocution during an arrest attempt.
- Richard "Dick" Jacobs (John Rubinstein): Publicly a fabric cutter, he is secretly a grid operative working for the "knitting society" under the direction of Mrs. Emerson, but since meeting his wife Eva, he decides to retire in order to support his family. For this perceived "treason", he is assassinated by Cleveland under orders of the "knitting society".
- Eva Jacobs (June Diane Raphael): Richard's wife and expecting mother, and a Tap Coder. She is unaware of her husband's affiliation with the "knitting society" until after his untimely demise, and together with La Fong begins to investigate his past and the circumstances of his death and subsequently flees to the Outside.
- Walter La Fong (Paul Scheer): A reporter for the Central Stations newspaper. Daylight, and a very close friend of Richard Jacobs and his wife.
- Sah (Eric Bauza): The proprietor of a noodle restaurant, which is used as a front for the Tap Coders' hideout.
- Chucky Wilcox (Josh Feldman): A Tap Coder friend of Frank Deetleman, he is killed by Cleveland so he can track down the revolutionaries.
- Commander Welles (Georg Stanford Brown): The current commander of the AMP.
- Mr. Orwell (James Urbaniak): Ruth's husband and a high-ranking politician in Electric City. Although he is devoted to Ruth, he is secretly sympathetic to Dr. Loman and his rebel cause.
- Giovanni Montalbon (Chris Parnell)
- Manny (Chad Coleman): A former grid operative, now the superintendent of Cleveland's residence in Morningsite.
- Jean Marie St. Cloud (Ginnifer Goodwin): Former officer of the AMP Forces and ex-girlfriend of Cleveland. Due to the machinations of the "knitting society" and the AMP, she is unaware that Cleveland is alive.

== Tie-ins ==
Along with the release of the web series, the mobile application was also released for iOS and Google Android. In addition to the 20 episodes, it includes 2 comics, a behind-the-scenes sneak peek, and character profiles. In addition to this, there is also a game called Electric City: The Revolt. It allows the player to become a key character as he attempts to undermine the power of the knitting society and restore people's freedom.

=== Electric City: The Revolt ===
Electric City: The Revolt
- Developer: Jump Games Pvt. Ltd.
- Series: Electric City
- Platform: iOS
- Release: July 17, 2012
- Genre: Role-playing

Electric City: The Revolt is a role-playing iOS game based on the animated post-apocalyptic science fiction web series Electric City. It was developed by Jump Games Pvt. Ltd. and released on July 17, 2012.

== Reception ==
Electric City won the Streamy Award for Best Animated Series.

== See also ==
- Spicy City, an animated futuristic science fiction series by Ralph Bakshi
