= Noah Z. Jones =

American screenwriter

- Born: Noah Zachary Jones; June 20, 1973 (age 53); Fairport, New York, U.S.
- Education: Fairport High School; Pacific Northwest College of Art
- Occupations: Animator, illustrator, screenwriter, producer
- Years active: 1997–present
- Notable work: Fish Hooks; Almost Naked Animals; The 7D; Pickle and Peanut; Dog & Frog
- Website: http://www.noahzjones.com/

Noah Zachary Jones (born June 20, 1973) is an American animator, screenwriter, illustrator and producer. He is the creator of the television series Fish Hooks, Almost Naked Animals, The 7D, and Pickle and Peanut. Jones was born in Fairport, New York, graduated from Fairport High School in 1991 and from Pacific Northwest College of Art in 1996. He lives in Los Angeles, California.

== Life and career ==
Jones was born in Fairport, New York on June 20, 1973. After graduating from Fairport High School in 1991, Jones attended Pacific Northwest College of Art and majored in Illustration. While attending college, he began to write children's books. Jones illustrated the children's book Not Norman: A Goldfish Story (2005) and its sequel Norman: One Amazing Goldfish! (2020). In 2006, Jones was in Camden, Maine working on children's books and freelance illustrating when Disney Channel asked him if he was interested in creating a television show. Jones pitched several ideas and Disney chose to move forward with what would eventually become Fish Hooks. He worked on the series remotely for two years before moving to California to work with the Disney team face-to-face. Fish Hooks went on the air in 2010. Jones chose to use photo collages for the background and digital drawings for the characters to give the show a quirky and hand-made feeling. He stated that simple shapes were chosen for the fish characters so their emotions and facial features would be emphasized. The show ran for three seasons.

In 2012, Disney Channels Worldwide announced that Jones developed and did the overall character re-designs of the dwarfs for the Snow White and The Seven Dwarfs spin-off The 7D. The series premiered on July 7, 2014, on Disney XD, it ran for 2 seasons and ended on 2016.

In June 2014, it was announced that Disney would pick up Jones' new series, Pickle and Peanut. Disney had asked Jones to create another series after the success of Fish Hooks and paired him with Joel Trussell. Jones stated that he wanted the main characters to act like normal teenage boys and incorporate offbeat humor. The series debuted on Disney XD in the fall of 2015. Jones also wrote and sang the show's theme song. The show ran for two seasons and ended on 2018.

In June 2019, Disney Branded Television announced that Jones had inked an overall development deal at Disney Television Animation, In 2022, it was revealed that Jones paired up with Ryan Quincy to develop a new project under the working title Hunch Bunch, the project would get renamed as Dog & Frog for Disney Channel.

== Works ==
=== Book illustrations ===
- Always in Trouble
- Trouble
- Welcome to the Bed & Biscuit
- Those Shoes
- The Monster in the Backpack
- The Superheroes Employment Agency
- Princess Pink and the Land of Fake-believe
- Little Sweet Potato
- Duck, Duck, Moose!
- The Monster in the Backpack
- Welcome to the Bed & Biscuit
- Dance with Me
- Not Norman: A Goldfish Story

=== Television ===
Series	Ep #	Seasons	Network	Airdate
Fish Hooks	59	3	Disney Channel	2010–14
Almost Naked Animals	52	3	YTV	2011–13
The 7D	44	2	Disney XD	2014–16
Pickle and Peanut	42	2	Disney XD	2015–18

== Personal life ==
Jones is married and has a son and a daughter.
