= Atomic Swindlers =

- Origin: Rochester, New York, United States
- Genres: Glam; Pop; Science fiction
- Labels: Self-released
- Members: April Laragy, vocals Chris Yockel, guitar Mike Gladstone, guitar Gary Trainer, bass Johnny Cummings, keyboards Roy Stein, drums
- Website: www.atomicswindlers.com

Atomic Swindlers is an American six-piece rock band from Rochester, New York, United States, fronted by April Laragy. They are known as more for the science-fiction laced sexuality they portray as for their music. They are more often compared to late 60s to early 70s glam and psychedelic bands like David Bowie and Pink Floyd than to any contemporary bands. Their initial following was mainly in the LGBT community.

== History ==
The band began as a recording project in Rochester, New York with frontwoman April Laragy on vocals and guitar, Gary Trainer on bass, and Roy Stein on drums. As they began to play together they realized that they would need to play live gigs to attract a following and added guitarists Chris Yockel and Scott Ostrowski for a fuller sound.

Adding Yockel and Ostrowski contributed to the emergence of the band's eclectic nature. Ostrowski, a blues-based traditional rock guitarist contrasted with Yockel's jagged ambient style to create an edgy tension to their sound.

Keyboardist Johnny Cummings rounded out the sextet and they began playing and recording the tracks for what would become their self-released debut album, Coming Out Electric. Ostrowski has since been replaced by Mike Gladstone.

== Attention from the LGBT community ==
Laragy's on-stage persona is of a space-aged biker lesbian and the band's homoerotic stage show and lyrics have not gone unnoticed by the LGBT community. They have been mentioned in Out magazine and the Advocate. Their first music video, "Float (My Electric Stargirl)", premiered at the ImageOut film festival.

== Coming Out Electric ==
The band's debut, self-released, concept album, Coming Out Electric, was released in 2004 and produced by Christopher Hooker, originally it was to be called Intergalactic Lesbian Love Songs. It has been compared to David Bowie's Ziggy Stardust and Pink Floyd's The Dark Side of the Moon. George Smith of the Village Voice has called it "a rock opera about spacebiker lesbian stargirls in love". Laragy, Trainer, and Stein shared all of the song-writing duties and maintain a science fiction theme throughout.

=== "Float (My Electric Stargirl)" ===
The first single from Coming Out Electric was "Float (My Electric Stargirl)". An animated video, described as "Barbarella-meets-Samurai Jack", was shot by director Joel Trussell and tells the story of a lesbian starship captain searching for her abducted lover. In addition to its premiere at the 2004 ImageOut festival, it has been featured at the 2005 Hypefest film and video film festival, New York's 4th annual Indie Music Video Festival, Vancouver's International Digital Festival 2005, and Brooklyn, New York's Animation Block Valentine Film Festival 2005.

== Live show ==
The shows are a multimedia experience that have been known to "inspire a mixture of wonder and confusion in the audience". Laragy has said of their shows, "We want to give the audience a surreal way to experience the band's music. By collaborating with these artists we are able to celebrate, explore, and connect the space between visual and musical performance... without the use of heavy pharmaceuticals".
