= ImageOut =

Annual LGBTQ+ film festival in Rochester, New York

- Genre: LGBTQ+ film festival
- Frequency: Annual
- Locations: Rochester, New York, United States
- Coordinates: 43.1560°N 77.5988°W
- Established: 1993
- Website: imageout.org

ImageOut: The Rochester LGBTQ+ Film Festival is an annual LGBTQ+ film festival held in Rochester, New York, United States. Founded in 1993 as the Rochester Lesbian & Gay Film & Video Festival by the Gay Alliance of the Genesee Valley and the Rochester Lesbian and Gay Political Caucus, it is the largest LGBTQ film festival in New York State outside New York City. The festival screens approximately 100 to 120 films over 10 to 11 days each fall, drawing more than 10,000 attendees annually. Its primary venues are The Little Theatre on East Avenue and the Dryden Theatre at the George Eastman Museum.

== History ==
=== Founding ===
The festival was established in 1993 through a collaboration between the Gay Alliance of the Genesee Valley and the Rochester Lesbian and Gay Political Caucus. The inaugural edition featured 18 programs encompassing approximately 100 films and achieved near 90 percent capacity at its screenings.

In 1995, the festival added the Dryden Theatre at the George Eastman Museum as a second venue and introduced its first closing-night gala. The following year, the organization incorporated as an independent 501(c)(3) nonprofit under the name "ImageOut," establishing itself as a standalone entity separate from its founding organizations.

=== Growth and expansion ===
By 2001, ImageOut had expanded to five venues across the Rochester area. In 2003, Michael Gamilla joined as programming director, a role he would hold for two decades. Under Gamilla's direction, the festival developed international partnerships, including a relationship with the Iris Prize festival in Cardiff, Wales.

In 2012, the festival updated its tagline to "The Rochester LGBT Film Festival" to reflect evolving terminology within the community. The 25th anniversary season in 2017 featured 65 films from 20 countries and included the establishment of ImageOutArt, an annual juried exhibition of emerging LGBTQ+ artists.

=== COVID-19 and adaptation ===
In 2020, the festival transitioned to a virtual format in response to the COVID-19 pandemic. During this period, ImageOut held a drive-in screening of the film Ammonite.

=== 30th anniversary and beyond ===
ImageOut celebrated its 30th anniversary in 2022 with a Pearl Jubilee charity gala held at the Century Club of Rochester. In 2021, the organization launched the First Cut Spring Film Festival as a second annual event.

In 2025, ImageOut established a partnership with the Rochester Queer Arts Festival, expanding its reach within the local arts community.

=== Death of Michael Gamilla ===
Michael Gamilla, the festival's programming director since 2003, died on March 8, 2023, at the age of 55, following a battle with leukemia. Born in Manila, Philippines, Gamilla had immigrated to the United States as an adult and became a central figure in Rochester's LGBTQ+ cultural community. During his tenure, he introduced the Flower City Flicks competition and the First Cut Spring Film Festival, and served as a juror for the Teddy Award at the Berlin International Film Festival. Gamilla programmed his final two festivals from his hospital bed and received the ImageOut Lifetime Achievement Award in 2022. Following his death, The Little Theatre dedicated its marquee in his honor.

== Programming ==
Each fall festival screens approximately 100 to 120 films selected from roughly 600 submissions, encompassing narrative features, documentaries, and short films. The festival has screened notable films including Princess Cyd, God's Own Country, and BPM (Beats per Minute).

=== First Cut Spring Film Festival ===
Launched in 2021, the First Cut Spring Film Festival serves as a companion event to the fall festival, offering additional LGBTQ+ film programming earlier in the year.

=== Flower City Flicks ===
The Flower City Flicks competition is a juried short film competition for local filmmakers, carrying a $500 cash prize.

== Awards ==
ImageOut presents several awards at each edition of the fall festival:

- Best Narrative Feature (Jury Prize)
- Best Documentary Feature (Jury Prize)
- Best Short (Jury Prize)
- Audience Awards
- Flower City Flicks Competition winner ($500 cash prize)

== Community programs ==
ImageOut operates several community-engagement programs beyond its film screenings:

- ImageOutReach connects festival patrons with Rochester-area LGBTQ+ community organizations and provides discounted or free tickets to underserved populations.
- Next Generation Film Series offers free screenings for attendees under the age of 25, focusing on films that address LGBTQ+ youth experiences.
- ImageOutWrite is an LGBTQ+ literary journal publishing prose and poetry.
- ImageOutArt is an annual juried exhibition of emerging LGBTQ+ visual artists, established in 2017.

== Organization ==
ImageOut is organized and produced by the Rochester Lesbian & Gay Film & Video Festival Inc., a 501(c)(3) nonprofit organization. The festival's managing director is Braden C. Reese.

== See also ==
- Rochester, New York
- The Little Theatre (Rochester, New York)
- George Eastman Museum
- List of LGBT film festivals
- Iris Prize
