= Out There (2013 TV series) =

- Genre: Comedy drama Coming of age Educational
- Created by: Ryan Quincy
- Voices of: Ryan Quincy; Justin Roiland; Megan Mullally; Fred Armisen; Pamela Adlon; Linda Cardellini; John DiMaggio; Kate Micucci
- Composers: Jason Kanakis; Brad Gordon
- Country of origin: United States
- Original language: English
- No. of seasons: 1
- No. of episodes: 10

Production
- Executive producers: Ryan Quincy; Tony Gama-Lobo; Rebecca May
- Running time: 22 minutes
- Production companies: Quincy Productions; 20th Century Fox Television

Original release
- Network: IFC
- Release: February 22 – April 19, 2013

Out There is an American adult animated television series created by Ryan Quincy. It aired on IFC for one season from February 22 to April 19, 2013, and was not renewed for a second. Out There was IFC's second animated project following 2005's Hopeless Pictures, which also lasted one season.

== Plot ==
Set in a world populated by anthropomorphic animals, the show chronicles the coming-of-age misadventures of socially awkward Chad, his little brother Jay, and his best friend Chris. Living in the small town of Holford (based on the real-life city of Holdrege, Nebraska), the boys wander its surreal, bleak landscape waiting out their last few years of adolescence. Other characters include Chad's parents, Wayne and Rose, as well as Chris's single mother, Joanie, and her disastrous boyfriend, Terry, and Sharla, the object of Chad's affection.

== Cast and characters ==
- Ryan Quincy as Chad Stevens - The main protagonist
- Justin Roiland as Chris Novak - Chad's best friend
- Kate Micucci as:
  - Jay Stevens - Chad's little brother
  - Kelly
- John DiMaggio as Wayne Stevens - Chad's dad
- Megan Mullally as Rose Stevens - Chad's mom
- Pamela Adlon as:
  - Joanie Novak - Chris's mom
  - Henrietta Miller - Chris' love interest
- Fred Armisen as Terry Rosachristas - Joanie's boyfriend
- Linda Cardellini as Sharla Lemoyne - Chad's love interest

=== Guest stars ===
Guest voices for Out There include:

- Selma Blair as:
  - Destiny - Chad's crush
  - Larry
- Jemaine Clement as:
  - Tenebres - Jay's bully/Destiny's little brother
  - Babel - Destiny and Tenebres' father
- Nick Offerman as Doug Lemoyne - Sharla's dad
- Stephen Root as Mr. Shooty - Frosty King owner
- Jason Schwartzman as:
  - Benjamin Brent - Frosty King employee/Chad's enemy
  - Cedric
- Christian Slater as Johnny Slade - most feared kid in Holford
- Sarah Silverman as Amy Corn - leader of the yearbook club
- Elliot Page as Amber (Note: Credited as Ellen Page; Page came out as transgender and changed his name in 2020.)

== Episodes ==
No.	Title	Directed by	Written by	Original release date	Prod. code
1	"The Great Escape"	Ryan Quincy	Ryan Quincy	February 22, 2013	1AVV01
Meet Chad Stevens -- a 15-year-old boy existing in the small town of Holford. He’s a loner, a soloist -- until he meets fellow outcast Chris. Chris hates Holford and is planning his escape, and he enlists kindred spirit Chad to help.
2	"Quest for Fantasy"	Ryan Quincy	Ryan Quincy	February 22, 2013	1AVV03
When Chad faints in class after seeing a diagram of the female reproductive system, Chris makes it his mission to get Chad more comfortable with the old, bold, female form. The boys hear a rumor about an adult photo shoot outside of town and embark on a quest to find it.
3	"A Chris by Any Other Name"	Ryan Quincy	Carson Mell	March 1, 2013	1AVV02
When Chris gets knocked down the bleachers during an assembly by one of the school bullies, he cries out in pain for his mom -- earning him the humiliating nickname “Mommy.” Chad helps Chris plot to get a better nickname, until one of Chris‘ ideas threatens Chad’s relationship with school crush Sharla.
4	"Springoween"	Ryan Quincy	Carson Mell	March 8, 2013	1AVV07
Because the previous Halloween was canceled due to extreme weather, Holford rescheduled the holiday for spring instead. Chad still wants to trick-or-treat, but Chris convinces him to go to a boy-girl party that goes horribly wrong. Meanwhile, Jay is on the run from Holford’s legendary maniacal bad boy, Johnny Slade.
5	"Frosty King"	Ryan Quincy	Matthew Lawton	March 15, 2013	1AVV05
Chad wrecks the family car and gets a job at Frosty King to pay for the damage. Chad immediately clashes with manager Benjamin Brent, the only other male employee who sees Chad as an obstacle in his otherwise sweet life of being the only rooster in the hen house. Chad must endure Benjamin’s torture while Chris tries to raise enough money to set Chad free from the shackles of the corporate world.
6	"Enter Destiny"	Ryan Quincy	Matthew Lawton	March 22, 2013	1AVV04
Chad is smitten with new girl Destiny, but he blows his chance after saving Jay from a bully who turns out to be her brother. Chad enlists Chris’ help to win her back with an elaborate plan involving walkie-talkies and a mysterious aphrodisiac.
7	"Joanie Loves Terry"	Jack Shih	Ryan Quincy	March 29, 2013	1AVV06
Chris is upset by how close his mom and her boyfriend Terry have become. When he sees Terry buying a ring at the flea market, Chris is terrified he’s going to propose. Chris and Chad concoct a plan to get Terry out of Chris’ life for good.
8	"Salem, My Salem"	Ryan Quincy	Grant Falardeau	April 5, 2013	1AVV08
After botching his oral presentation for history class, Chad decides to make a movie instead. With Chris’ help/interference, the project becomes increasingly off-topic and out of control, leading to a disaster of near-biblical proportions.
9	"Viking Days"	Ryan Quincy	Rebecca May	April 12, 2013	1AVV10
When Wayne declines Chad’s request to compete in Holford’s annual father-and-son Hexathalon, Chad asks Sharla’s dad to compete with him instead. Meanwhile, Joanie asks Chris and Terry to do the race together to strengthen their bond, and the contest brings out everyone’s true colors.
10	"Ace's Wild"	Ryan Quincy	Tony Gama-Lobo	April 19, 2013	1AVV09
Chad’s classroom doodles draw the attention of the “cool kid” yearbook staff, who invite him to join their inner circle. Chad and Chris enjoy their popular status until Chad discovers their new friends have ulterior motives.

== Reception ==
The show received mixed reviews. Robert Lloyd of the Los Angeles Times gave it a positive review. He compared the animation favorably to Bob's Burgers and said that the series has "a gentler, more delicate, behind-the-beat groove". New York Times calls it "dreamy, charming, deeply personal." Mixed reviews included Boston Globe's, Matthew Gilbert's, who called it "just fine", continuing, "the sincerity is refreshing in an animated context, but the characters and the stories are old hat." A review by PopMatters stated "It is often funny, but it could be funnier if it were wed to more coherent storytelling." A review from Slant Magazine declared "Out There presents an array of by-the-numbers boyhood scenarios that frequently feel stale, having an indistinct, been-there-done-that vibe."
