= Ryan Quincy =

American animator

- Born: January 14, 1973 (age 53); Kearney, Nebraska, United States
- Occupations: Writer, director, producer, animator, voice actor
- Years active: 1994–present
- Known for: South Park; Out There; Future-Worm!
- Spouse: Angi Glenn
- Children: 2

Ryan Wayne Quincy (born January 14, 1973, in Kearney, Nebraska, USA) is an American animator, director, writer, producer, and voice actor. He is known for his work on South Park, and was the creator of Out There on IFC and Future-Worm! on Disney XD.

== Personal life ==
He lives in California with his wife, former South Park animator Angi Glenn and they have two children together, a son and daughter, named Liam and London.

== Filmography ==
=== Television ===
Year	Title	Role	Notes
1995	Mad TV	—N/a	animator
1999–2011	South Park	—N/a	animator, lead animator, animation supervisor, animation supervisor, animation director, animation producer and technical supervisor
2013	Out There	Chad Stevens	Main voice role; creator, writer, director and executive producer
2015	Pickle and Peanut	—N/a	writer and storyboard artist (Gory Agnes)
2016–2018	Future-Worm!	Doug Douglas, Robo-Carp, Claude, additional voices	Voice role; creator, writer, and executive producer
2021–2023	Ten Year Old Tom	—N/a	animation producer (seven episodes) and co-executive producer
2025–present	Long Story Short	—N/a	animation director
2026	Dog & Frog	—N/a	co-creator

=== Film ===
Year	Title	Role	Notes
1999	South Park: Bigger, Longer & Uncut	—N/a	animator

== Awards and honors ==
Quincy has received four Primetime Emmy Award nominations for his work on South Park, winning twice. In 2008, he won the Emmy for Outstanding Animated Program (For Programming One Hour Or More) as Director of Animation for the South Park special Imaginationland. The following year, he won again in the category of Outstanding Animated Program (For Programming Less Than One Hour) for the episode "Margaritaville."

He received additional nominations in 2010 for the two-part episode "200/201" and in 2011 for "Crack Baby Athletic Association," both in the Outstanding Animated Program category, serving as Animation Producer on both submissions.

Awards and nominations received by Quincy's Shows
Year	Title	Category	Emmy Awards		Role
Year	Title	Category	Nominations	Wins	Role
2008	Imaginationland (South Park)	Outstanding Animated Program (For Programming One Hour Or More)	1		Director of Animation
2009	Margaritaville (South Park)	Outstanding Animated Program (For Programming Less Than One Hour)	1		Director of Animation
2010	200/201 (South Park)	Outstanding Animated Program	1	1	Animation Producer
2011	Crack Baby Athletic Association (South Park)	Outstanding Animated Program	1	1	Animation Producer
