= Joel Trussell =

American television director (born 1972)

- Born: Joel Ragan Trussell; June 19, 1972 (age 53); Jefferson City, Missouri, U.S.
- Education: University of Tennessee, Knoxville (BFA)
- Occupations: Television producer; animator; voice actor

Joel Ragan Trussell (June 19, 1972) is an American television producer, director and animator based in Los Angeles, California. Known for his work in animation, he has executive produced Netflix Animation's Captain Fall (2023), executive produced and developed Disney XD's Pickle and Peanut (2015–2018), and directed Tom Hanks' animated miniseries Electric City (2012).

Trussell has also directed several award-winning music videos, and many animated segments for Yo Gabba Gabba! on Nickelodeon. In 2008 he was selected by Mike Judge to direct the intro for The Animation Show. Pictoplasma has published Trussell's work in their Character Encyclopedia, and two collections of their Characters in Motion (2&3). He was selected as a speaker at their 2011 event in New York City and the 2012 event in Berlin.

== Music videos ==
Year	Artist	Song title
2003	Kid606	"The Illness"
2004	Atomic Swindlers	"Float"
2005	Jason Forrest	"War Photographer"
2006	Coldcut	"This Island Earth"
2006	M. Ward	"Chinese Translation"
2007	Morcheeba	"Enjoy the Ride"
2007	Morcheeba	"Gained the World"
2008	Jakob Dylan	"Evil is Alive and Well"
2009	The Gossip	"Love Long Distance"
2009	Kid606	"Mr. Wobble's Nightmare"
2012	M. Ward	"The First Time I Ran Away"
2023	M. Ward	Supernatural Thing"
