= Pickle and Peanut =

American animated television series

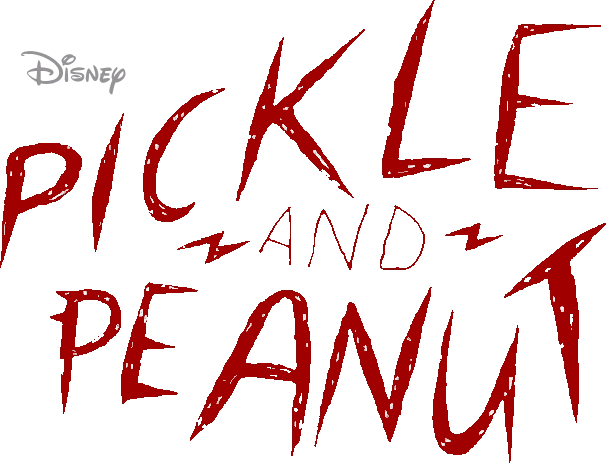
- Genre: Surreal comedy; Black comedy; Adventure fiction; Absurdism
- Created by: Noah Z. Jones
- Developed by: Joel Trussell
- Directed by: Noah Z. Jones; Joel Trussell; John Aoshima; Andrew Overtoom; Ryan Gillis
- Voices of: Jon Heder; Johnny Pemberton; Dana Snyder
- Theme music composer: Tinfoil 2000
- Opening theme: Pickle and Peanut by Tinfoil 2000
- Ending theme: How's Your Mom? by Tinfoil 2000
- Composer: Brad Breeck
- Country of origin: United States
- Original language: English
- No. of seasons: 2
- No. of episodes: 42 (82 segments) (list of episodes)

Production
- Executive producers: Noah Z. Jones; Joel Trussell
- Animators: Mercury Filmworks (episode 1a); Copernicus Studios (episodes 1b–42)
- Editors: Greg Levitan (season 1); Andy Tauke (season 1); John Boyer (season 2)
- Running time: 22 minutes
- Production company: Disney Television Animation

Original release
- Network: Disney XD
- Release: September 7, 2015 – January 20, 2018

Pickle and Peanut is an American animated television series created by Noah Z. Jones and developed by Joel Trussell. It aired on Disney XD from September 7, 2015, to January 20, 2018. It is about two friends, Pickle and Peanut, an anthropomorphic pickle and peanut whose misadventures form the content of the show. The show utilizes a wide variety of different art styles and animation techniques. This includes but is not limited to stylized traditional animation, CGI, rotoscoping, stop motion, puppetry, stock imagery, special effects, visual effects, and live action.

On July 23, 2016, the series was renewed for a second season, which began a year later on October 23, 2017. The second season finished airing with a set of four episodes on January 20, 2018; Trussell confirmed through Twitter that the episodes would be the series' last.

The series was very popular in Japan with its popularity compared to other Disney IPs such as The Three Caballeros and Stitch, so much so that extensive merchandise for the series was being sold in Japan.

== Characters ==
=== Main ===
- Pickle (voiced by Jon Heder) is a dimwitted and happy-go-lucky pickle. Often causing mischief, Pickle is the best friend of Peanut. Despite his adulthood, Pickle can be shy and sometimes a nerd, and cowardly. Pickle works at the Mjärt Mart along with Peanut, doing cool stuff whenever they can.
- Peanut (voiced by Johnny Pemberton) – Pickle's best friend, a peanut who wants to be cool and popular. Peanut is a freewheeling, peanut-resembling humanoid. Besides the goal of popularity, he also tries to attract ladies. Peanut is cooler and a bit smarter than Pickle. Peanut, like Pickle, works at the Mjärt Mart, doing cart stunts whenever they can.

=== Recurring ===
- Mr. Mjärt (voiced by Matt Chapman) – A businessman who is the manager of his store, Mjärt Mart.
- Lazer (voiced by H. Michael Croner) – A party-throwing teenager who hates Pickle and Peanut.
- Champion Horse (voiced by Noah Z. Jones) – A heroic and very muscular horse.
- McSweats (voiced by Dana Snyder) – One of Pickle and Peanut's friends.
- Spedacular Donkey (voiced by Bennie Arthur) – A donkey who tries his best to be helpful, but always falls short.
- Sneaky Patty (voiced by Abbi Jacobson) – A woman who hides out in the bushes at Pickle's house.
- Wayne (voiced by Noah Z. Jones) – A mute character with an ugly face and creepy stare.
- Ragga (voiced by Kevin Michael Richardson) – A Jamaican goose who sells crazy products to help the boys whenever they need help.
- Mr. Whispers (voiced by Joel Trussell) – The disembodied voice that announces the boy's actions in most episodes.
- Papa (voiced by Patton Oswalt) – The leader of the Russian Mob who harasses anyone he can.
- Dr. Pamplemousse (voiced by Jet Jurgensmeyer) - A 3rd grade boy who often acts as a doctor and other various jobs, he comes up with strange diagnoses.
- Big Dook (voiced by Leslie Hall) - Another one of Pickle and Peanut's friends.

=== Minor ===
- Greg (voiced by Joel Trussell) – Pickle and Peanut's pimple friend originally found on Pickle's buttock. The pair decided to give him to Lazer. First seen in "Greg".
- Little Pickle – Pickle's pet "falcon" who is actually not a falcon. Adopted by Pickle in "Pickle the Falcon Master".
- Mam Mams (voiced by H. Michael Croner) – Pickle's friend who is sent to jail.
- Kylie (voiced by Jessica Lowe) – A swimming teacher that Peanut is in love with.
- Mylie (also voiced by Jessica Lowe) – A sister of Kylie's.
- Gory Agnes (voiced by Louie Anderson) – A woman who is actually a ghost Pickle is dating in "Gory Agnes". She is based on the Bloody Mary legend.
- Bloodbeard (voiced by JB Blanc) – A cart rustler with blood as his beard, hence his nickname. Seen in "Cart Rustlers".
- PAL-SCAN (voiced by Roger Craig Smith) – A self-check out scanner that came alive in "PAL-SCAN".
- Jeffrey (voiced by Noah Z. Jones) – A little boy who prances around holding flowers and enjoys nice things like spring.
- Rat King (voiced by H. Michael Croner) – A man in a tribal rat costume, who lives underground with a bunch of his minions.
- D-Stixx (voiced by Kool Keith) – A rapper who made the Turkey Wrap Headphones. Seen in "Luxury Car Service".
- Couch Dracula (voiced by Paul Reubens) – He is a couch salesman who refused to sell a haunted couch to the boys.
- Veronica (voiced by Laura Marano) - Couch Dracula's daughter.
- 90's Adventure Bear (voiced by Shaquille O'Neal/Mark Henry in Season 2) – A washed up 90s star that made Pickle and Peanut's childhood, parodying Baloo's role in TaleSpin.
- Radu (voiced by Greg Tuculescu) – The magical mascot of Cabbage Day, who was killed by Papa.
- Francine (voiced by Toks Olagundoye) – McSweats' ex-girlfriend who later got back together in "Francine".
- Bike Jumper (voiced by Danny Pudi) – A guy who became internet famous by jumping over bikes, with the help of Pickle and Peanut.
- Tad (voiced by Steve Blum) – A man who has tongs.
- TX (voiced by Scott Menville) - A 3D chalk artist who is unsure of what the public thinks about his work..
- Sugar Bees (voiced by Laura Ortiz and Mckenna Grace) – A band of girl scouts who are rivals of Pickle and Peanut.
- Pigfoot (voiced by Noah Z. Jones) – A legendary creature whose name is a portmanteau of a pig and Bigfoot, which Pickle and Peanut befriended. In the end, they find out a man is in it.
- Hunter (voiced by Steve Blum) – A man who was dedicated to hunt Pigfoot, also a loving father to his son.
- Goats – Antagonists in the episode "Tae Kwon Bro".
- Falcons – Appeared in "Pickle the Falcon Master". One of them is evil and its owner is from Wayne.
- Sewer Shark – Pickle and Peanut befriended it in "Sewer Shark".
- Queen Carney (voiced by Grey DeLisle) - The ruler of the local carnival.
- Magic Dragon (voiced by Chris Tergliafera) - A magical dragon whom Pickle and Peanut found trapped inside a bag of bananas. They freed him and tried to help him find a friend who would not seek to abuse his powers.
- Tender and Sweet Lovin (voiced by Greg Felden) - Two musician brothers who appear to have a brotherly bond that inspires hope. However, they actually hate each other and steal the songs of other musicians.
- Funwagon (voiced by Tony Hale) - Lazer's prized sports car which ends up getting brought to life after Peanut and Pickle spray it with toxic ooze.
- Sadie (voiced by Yvette Nicole Brown) - A woman who works at the information kiosk at the aquarium. She actually turns out to be a mermaid.
- King Pin Smasher (voiced by Jim Norton) - Wayne's demonic brother who is in charge of the Bowling Underworld.
- Gramma Pickle – Pickle's grandma, a cookie-baking elder who ends up deceased. Her remains are shown in a jar, with them becoming the secret ingredient for her cookies: love.

=== Guest Stars ===
- Melissa Joan Hart - Hart voices herself in the episodes "Tree Lighting" and "Clip Show".

== Episodes ==
Season	Segments	Episodes	Originally released	
Season	Segments	Episodes	First released	Last released
1	40	21	September 7, 2015	October 10, 2016
2	42	21	October 23, 2017	January 20, 2018

== Broadcast ==
The series premiered on Disney Channel in Canada on September 12, 2015 and was moved to Disney XD on December 1, 2015.
