= Ollie & Scoops =

American animated web series

- Opening title card for Ollie & Scoops.
- Genre: Adventure; Fantasy; Comedy
- Created by: Nico Colaleo
- Written by: Nico Colaleo; Emily Brundige; Matt Brailey
- Directed by: Nico Colaleo
- Voices of: Kimmy Robertson; Eric Bauza; Mike Stoklasa; Grey Griffin; Rich Evans; Vivienne Medrano; Adam McArthur
- Theme music composer: Dave Neff
- Opening theme: "Ollie & Scoops"
- Country of origin: United States
- Original language: English
- No. of seasons: 1
- No. of episodes: 10

Production
- Executive producer: Nico Colaleo
- Editor: Nico Colaleo
- Running time: 2–18 minutes
- Production companies: Nico Animation, LLC

Original release
- Network: YouTube
- Release: June 10, 2019 – present

Ollie & Scoops is an American independent animated comedy web series created by Nico Colaleo. The series follows Ollie and her pet cat Scoops as they go on misadventures brought upon by Ollie's ability to communicate with cats.

The pilot premiered on June 10, 2019. The series was received positively by reviewers.

== Synopsis ==
The series stars 9-year-old Ollie, who can communicate with and understand cats. Ollie and her family pet cat Scoops are best friends. The show follows Ollie and Scoops as they go on misadventures brought upon by Ollie's gift of being able to communicate with cats; whether at her home, school, in their neighborhood, or down in the secret underground cat society, the vast city of Catlifornia.

== Characters ==
=== Main characters ===
- Ollie Purkleworth (voiced by Kimmy Robertson from 2019 to 2023) — A 9-year-old girl and the series' main protagonist. She looks out for Scoops, her family pet cat and also best friend, but sometimes can't help but causing trouble herself. Her heart is always in the right place though, and by the end of every episode she will always set things right if she has steered things too far off course.
- Scoopleton P. "Scoops" Scoopsworth (voiced by Eric Bauza from 2019 to 2023) — The family's pet cat, and best friend of Ollie. Scoops was a gift to Ollie from her parents for her 6th birthday. While Scoops can frequently cause trouble due to clumsiness, ego, selfishness, or being a bit of a showoff, he would do anything to help Ollie and correct whatever mischief he's caused the two of them.

=== Supporting characters ===
- Julia Goldburger (voiced by Grey Griffin) - A classmate of Ollie's. Julia is an ego-centric, school-obsessed perfectionist who needs to be the best at everything, the stress of which has caused her hairloss. She is considered the main antagonist of the series, but is more of a comedic annoyance than an evil/negative villain.
- Carl (voiced by Rachael Russakoff) - A classmate of Ollie's. A mild-mannered, shy boy, with an angsty teenaged older sister named Stacy. Carl has a crush on Ollie but is too embarrassed to tell her how he feels.
- Stacy (voiced by Emily Brundige) - Ollie's teenaged babysitter, and older sister of Carl. She is surly, rude and has plenty of that classic teen angst, but deep down she really does love her little brother Carl.
- Binnie Bivvins (voiced by Kelsy Abbott) - Ollie's neurotic but sweet and caring 4th grade teacher at Davis County Elementary. She loves her students and to teach children, but at the same time she's still sort of figuring herself out. She is in a relationship with Ollie's science teacher, Miss Whippleworth.
- Wendy Whippleworth (voiced by Rebeka Thomas) - Ollie's science teacher at Davis County Elementary. She is in a relationship with Ollie's primary teacher, Miss Bivvins.
- Principal J. Liquids (voiced by Piotr Michael) - The principal of Davis County Elementary, Ollie's school. An homage/parody of film director John Waters.
- Milky (voiced by Kelsy Abbott) - Another of Ollie's classmates.
- Ollie's Parents - Ollie's mom and dad. They gifted Scoops as a baby kitten to Ollie for her 6th birthday. While we have seen them in multiple episodes, as of this writing, so far we don't know their names or have heard them speak.
- Biscuits (voiced by Tiana Camacho) - A tough alley cat that Scoops has a huge crush on.
- Merle (voiced by Rich Evans) - A thin, sleazy, conniving alley cat who frequently causes Ollie and Scoops all kinds of trouble. Brunk is his main associate/lackey.
- Brunk (voiced by Mike Stoklasa) - A big orange-furred lummox of an alley cat who frequently causes Ollie and Scoops all kinds of trouble. He is Merle's right-hand man.
- Mayor Scrumpy (voiced by Nico Colaleo) - The mayor of Catlifornia, a cat with sky-blue fur who is always wearing a mayoral sash.
- Poopsie St. Pierre (voiced by Vivienne Medrano) - A flirty, rich and spoiled little lady cat who most of the boy cats have crushes on.
- Dan Dipple (voiced by Brock Baker) - If Top Cat was crossed with a used car salesman.
- Hoagie (voiced by Matt Brailey) - A clumsy cat with dark blue fur who might be the unluckiest guy on the planet.
- Rudy (voiced by Adam McArthur) - A little guy with red fur who loves to act cool and suave. In a relationship with Poopsie St. Pierre.
- Cuddles (voiced by Candi Milo) - A little cat with pink fur and a very cutesy personality.
- Macaroni and Cheese (voiced by Daron Nefcy) - A very cute, fluffy white cat who turns big, scary and demonic when annoyed or angered.
- Dr. Toodles (voiced by James Urbaniak) - A local mad scientist who lives in a big laboratory deep within the shores of Catlifornia Harbor.
- Old Crumplecranks (voiced by Chase Beck) - A spooky legend that all cats know about and treat as folklore, Old Crumplecranks is a giant evil cat that is said to live high up in the hills of Mount Cattywampus, in the outskirts of Catlifornia.
- Brother Whiskers (voiced by JD Ryznar) - A cat who appears in the episode "Warm Cream", and who may or may not be a member of Terry Bumble's kitty cult.
- Brother Puddles (voiced by Rich Evans) - A cat who, like Whiskers, appears in the episode "Warm Cream", and who may or may not be a member of Terry Bumble's kitty cult.
- Claudia Grimson (aka The Creepy Girl) (voiced by Mara Wilson) - A stoic goth girl and new friend that Ollie meets at the video store.
- Edgar & Eleanore Grimson (voiced by Jeffrey Combs and Barbara Crampton) - Claudia's (the Creepy Girl) equally creepy parents, both crazed scientists and morticians who are deeply in love, with some inspiration from Morticia and Gomez Addams.
- Dougie the Lab Cat (voiced by Dana Snyder) - A cat who has recently escaped from laboratory testing, leaving him with some short fuses and major paranoia. He has silver fur and a collar with a pink heart on it.
- Terry Bumble (voiced by Mike Stoklasa) - A geeky man-child with a dangerous obsession with all things cats. He has pale skin, orange hair, braces, and blue green eyes.
- The Bad Tempered Cinema Geek (voiced by James Rolfe) - A chair-bound film geek and critic who loves making video reviews complaining about movies on the internet.

== Production and release ==
In June 2019, the series began airing on YouTube. Natasha Weir works as a character designer, while Nicole Hardy did animation work on the series, using Adobe Animate CC. Ashley Nichols, an animator for the Hazbin Hotel pilot and Colaleo's Too Loud series, worked as an animator for the series. Colaleo created, directs and produces the series. Rachael Lillis also voiced a character on the series, a math teacher, in one episode, her last voice role before her death from cancer in August 2024. Natasha Kline, creator of the Primos animated series, was a storyboarder for the series' third episode, "Gimmie a Hand". In February 2021, Colaleo shared with Terry Ibele, on his Animation Industry Podcast, about his job, how he started Ollie & Scoops, and the resources it takes to create each episode. In the interview, he revealed that he did the initial designs for the characters then gave them to Natasha Weir, the character designer, said he created originally for pitching it to animation studios, but that Cartoon Network and Nickelodeon turned it down and told him to come back in a few years. He further noted that Netflix rejected it because they had Hilda, said that each episode costs $10,000 to $15,000, that at least 20 people work on each episode, and hopes the show could get bigger until they get studio funding.

In January 2022, Toon Boom interviewed Colaleo who noted and explained many different and interesting points about creating your own animated series: He has said that being a showrunner involves making sure your crew is happy, checking in with them to gather their work, giving notes and tweaks, and has mentioned that he is, as showrunner, "involved with and in charge of every single part of the show." He has said that it's important to always be open to hearing ideas from your show's crew of artists. He also revealed that he works with at least 30 people per episode, including the storyboard artists, animators, clean-up artists, and voice actors, nearly doubling in growth from the first year of the show when only 10 to 15 people worked on each episode. He further noted that he originally pitched Ollie & Scoops "all over Burbank" (to Nickelodeon, Cartoon Network, Disney, and Netflix, so far) and started producing and working on Ollie & Scoops on his own when Too Loud ended, adding that he wanted to choose an all ages route rather than an adult route for the show.

In June 2026, Colaleo shared with his audience that, due to the animation industry's increasing instability, he doesn't have the money to continue producing episodes of Ollie & Scoops since 2023, and presented a GoFundMe campaign to continue the series in the form of animatics until budgets become large enough for the episodes to be fully animated in the future.

Due to Kimmy Robertson parting ways within the capacity of the show and Eric Bauza passing away in 2026, it left Ollie and Scoops themselves temporarily voiceless.

== Episodes ==
No.	Title	Written by	Original release date
1	"Pizza Pilot"	Nico Colaleo & Matt Brailey	June 10, 2019
Ollie and Scoops want a bacon pizza they saw on TV rather than the cooking of Ollie's mom. Stacy begins livestreaming her food show, while Ollie is fed up being treated like a kid. She steals Stacy's credit card and they order bacon pizzas, eating them together. Scoops taunts a stray cat outside the window and the cats break into the kitchen, trying to eat all the pizza. It turns into a house party, but Scoops is too enthralled with a female cat to help Ollie. She throws the vegan quiche at the cats and they scatter. She later laments she isn't the big kid she thought she was. They eat the last slice of the bacon pizza together.
2	"Funny Face"	Nico Colaleo	July 10, 2019
At Davis Elementary School, Ollie grumbles about the class photo, as she is always shoved into the back, but Scoops tells her she needs to stand out. This annoys Julia Goldburger, head of the school's yearbook committee, while Miss Bivvins is enjoying herself. Julia blows up at Ollie, but ends up messing up the class photo. Ollie later thanks Scoops for giving her a good class photo and they both agree their funny faces were better than the one Julia did.
3	"Gimmie a Hand"	Nico Colaleo & Matt Brailey	October 3, 2019
Scoops brings Ollie to Catlifornia, a secret underground society of cats humans don't know about, while Julia watches them enter a trash can from a nearby playground. Ollie is amazed and Scoops believe it will make him be more respected by other cats, but instead people look away. Two cats try and shake down Scoops, but they are impressed when Ollie gives them a thumbs up, with he thumbs drawing their attention. Rudy and Poopsie are on a date, with Ollie helping by picking a flower for them. She impresses more cats and becomes so helpful that Scoops becomes jealous, wanting a slice of the attention. Scoops gets surgery so he can have thumbs, even after being warned by the evil Dr. Toodles. Ollie begins get worried about Scoops, and she is shocked to see him with hands. These hands fly off his paws and ravage Catlifornia. Ollie tells Scoops to not care what the other cats think, calling him the coolest. Ollie and Scoops devise a plan to stop the huge human hands. They are able to wrangle the two human hands. The citizens of Catlifornia blame everything on Ollie and Scoops and tell them to leave. They do so. Dr. Toodles is shown wearing the human hands.
4	"Episode 4"	Adam Rivera (songwriter) & Nico Colaleo (songwriter)	November 26, 2019
A full-length Ollie & Scoops series theme song sung by Whitney Avalon.
5	"Student of the Month"	Nico Colaleo	December 30, 2019
As Ollie is walking into school with Scoops, he sees that Julia Goldburger has won the student of the month award, with Ollie describing Julia as an over-achiever. Julia walks into the school which much fanfare, even though her popularity annoys people. Principal Liquid takes notice of the friendship between Ollie and Scoops and makes Ollie student of the month. Julia loses it and thinks that because she isn't the "best student" in the school, she is "trash." The following day, Ollie gets a lot of the attention from the students, until Julia comes in and shaves people's heads. This earns her the position "worst student of the month." The next day, Julia dresses up as Ollie and brings along a fat cat, Brunk, to ruin Ollie's reputation, giving people wedgies and ripping off the principal's mustache. Brunk eats Julia but Ollie and Scoops are able to save her. Ollie helps Julia out, relinquishing her student of the month award to Julia, making her happy. The day after, Julia finds out that the Principal made Ollie the Student Vice-President. Ollie and Scoops hug her, but she begins shaking with anger.
6	"Old Crumplecranks"	Nico Colaleo	March 11, 2020
Poopsie wants to leave Catlifornia, avoiding troubles like people trying to hit on her and her purse getting stolen. Even after being warned about Old Crumplecranks on Mount Cattywumpus, she still decides to go with Rudy to the mountain. As they climb the mountain, Rudy says he feels better but Poopsie keeps thinking of the stories about Crumplecranks. They go inside the lair of Crumplecranks and he meets them, trying to scare them the best he can. They escape the mountain and run back into the town in terror. They run away into their house and hide under the bed.
7	"Tutor Suitor"	Story by: Emily Brundige Teleplay by: Nico Colaleo	October 22, 2020
Miss Binnie Bivvins, Ollie's teacher at school, realizes she has feelings toward Wendy Whippleworth, the school's science teacher. Ollie and Scoops try to help her express these feelings, as Miss Bivvins is consumed by anxiety and can't express herself from being so shy. Ollie and Scoops scheme to put Binnie and Wendy to meet together, a tutor session that night at Ollie's that is obviously a dinner date for the two teachers. Miss Bivvins tries to go along with Ollie's scheme, but has doubts, as it turns into a romantic evening. She is so mortified that she leaves to go back to her apartment, which is a set. She flees to the movie theater and sees Ollie on the screen. Still terrified, she flies a helicopter to a remote island. She angrily talks to Ollie for trying to play matchmaker. She says she likes a show named Dragon Times, which Wendy also likes, resulting in them having something in common. They agree to have a binge-watching night together and get pad thai takeout. They get in the helicopter and leave the island together, with Binnie thanking Ollie. As Wendy and Binnie leave, Ollie and Scoops are left behind on the island, with Scoops expressing concern, but Ollie saying it doesn't matter how they get home.
8	"Warm Cream"	Story by: Nico Colaleo, Matt Brailey, and R. Chett Hoffman Teleplay by: Nico Colaleo	October 11, 2021
Ollie laments a long school day, and she tells Scoops she needs some alone time, having sensory overload. She gets home and watches the series finale of Dragon Times and Scoops accidentally spoils the episode. Ollie lashes out against Scoops, asking why she has to understand cats, and wishes she couldn't talk to cats at all. She realizes she said the wrong thing but when she tries to take her words back, he leaves. Scoops thinks of going back but then he meets Terry Bumble who has a sanctuary for cats. Scoops is enthralled and thinks this place is for him, and loves drinking the warm cream that Terry keeps offering everyone. He talks to Dougie who is skeptical of Terry. Back at home, Ollie cries when she realizes Scoops may not be coming back, and in really missing him, decides to go out searching for him. Back at Terry's, Dougie continues to warn Scoops but he ignores the warnings. After drinking so many glasses of warm cream, Scoops begins to lose it and he is about to take a bath, when Terry is in the bath too, scaring him. He tries to escape, but he is kept there by the other cats, who have him drink warm cream, making him sleepy. Dougie escapes, Ollie looks for Scoops and when finding his collar she thinks back to when she got him as a birthday present. She laments saying mean things to him. Scoops wakes up to Terry trying to become a kitty cat, complete with human-sized fur suit made of shaved fur from all his cats, brainwashed from all the warm cream they've been drinking. Dougie hears Ollie looking for Scoops and informs her that Scoops got abducted by Terry, and she races to save him. Terry prepares to shave Scoops' fur to complete his cat costume, but Ollie busts in the nick of time and saves him, at the same time inadvertently destroying the warm cream fountain and knocking the cats out of their trance. She embraces Scoops and criticizes Terry for being a creep who mind controls cats. She tells Terry how to make everything right, so he can have a cat sanctuary which is good for cats. Ollie and Scoops apologize to each other. Dougie rides off into the distance on a motorcycle.
9	"Vinnie Video"	Nico Colaleo & Bunny Pina	June 29, 2022
To prove that cats and dogs can get along, Ollie takes a dog-hating Scoops to the local video store, Vinnie Video, in search of an old movie from Ollie's childhood called Morko & Ungus (a parody of Milo and Otis). During their video store visit they not only encounter characters both familiar and new, but they also uncover the shocking truth about some strange and mysterious creatures that have been recently terrorizing their hometown.
10	"A Night at Claudia's"	Nico Colaleo & Bunny Pina	April 21, 2023
Continuing from the previous episode, Ollie and Scoops have a sleepover at her new friend Claudia's house. A hesitant Scoops gets possessed by a corn-crazed demon from watching a cursed VHS tape that had accidentally been brought home from the video store. In the end, Claudia's parents save the day and destroy the tape in the process, freeing Scoops from his demonic possession.
11	"Bad Baby Boy"	Nico Colaleo	TBA
12	"Catch My Thrift?"	Nico Colaleo & Bunny Pina	TBA
While the episode's plot hasn't been shared yet, Colaleo has revealed via Twitter that Kevin Conroy will, posthumously, guest star.

== Reception ==
The series was received positively. Captain Cats and the Nightrider praised the voice cast and described the show as a "hidden gem of a series." Burkely Hermann, a reviewer for The Geekiary, described the series as unique. He also praised the voice acting, music, LGBTQ representation, animation, and character development in the series.
