= Natasha Kline =

American cartoonist, storyboard artist and producer (born 1986)

- Born: 1986 (age 39–40); West Covina, California, U.S.
- Education: California Institute of the Arts
- Occupation: Cartoonist
- Known for: Primos (creator); Big City Greens (director); South Park (storyboard artist)

Natasha Kline (born 1986) is an American cartoonist, animator, filmmaker, and voice actress. She is the creator of the animated television series Primos. She is also known for her work on Big City Greens, South Park, The Lego Ninjago Movie, Home: Adventures with Tip & Oh, and Too Loud, in addition to executively producing the series and voicing Heather "Gordita" Humphrey, Isabel Christina "ChaCha" Ramírez, and many characters.

== Early life ==
Kline was born in 1986, in West Covina, Los Angeles. She spent summers with her multicultural, and extended, Mexican-American family with an obsession of cartoons at an early age. She later told Variety that, at age 3, she was inspired by the animated video for Tom Petty's "Runnin’ Down a Dream" to become an animator. Kline made her first animated film in high school with a camcorder using VHS tapes, later describing it was "the most horrible way to animate...but it was a film." In March 2023, Kline said that she watched shows on MTV and Nickelodeon as a kid, such as Hey Arnold!, Rugrats, Æon Flux, Looney Tunes, and musical features by Disney Corporation.

Kline attended Cal State Fullerton, where she studied illustration. She later got a degree in animation at the California Institute of the Arts.

== Career ==
=== South Park ===
Kline was a storyboarder and designer on seasons 12 to 18 of South Park, from 2008 to 2015. In March 2023, she described it as her first animation industry job, and noted she was part of a group of six people who made "all the pre-production materials for the show".

In 2022, Kline told Stuart Miller of Variety that South Park creator Trey Parker was a "huge inspiration" to help her see "what is possible as a storyteller". She would be a storyboarder, character designer, and background artist for the video game, South Park: The Stick of Truth. In a December 2020 comic, she stated that the show's workplace was a "toxic environment".

=== Big City Greens ===
Kline was a storyboarder and director for Big City Greens in the first three seasons, from 2018 to 2021. Her writing on the show would be nominated for an Emmy Award. Kline later said she "loved working" on the show and that it was "such a great experience". Shane Houghton, one of the show creators, also called her a "hilarious, talented, and a terrific leader".

=== Primos ===
It was announced in July 2019 that she signed, a development deal with Disney Television Animation, as did 16 other animators and artists.

In November 2021, Disney Branded Television ordered Primos, an animated comedy series, with Kline as creator and executive producer. Kline described it as born from her personal experiences, and said she was excited to share her "family dynamic through these new Disney characters and stories." The series received an original order of 20 episodes, which was increased to 30 episodes, as announced in June 2022 at the Annecy International Animation Film Festival. The series was inspired by Kline's childhood summers living with her cousins alongside her extended Mexican-American family, with Kline saying she wanted the lead characters to also be of Mexican-American heritage due to the lack of Mexican-American representation on television during her childhood. Meredith Roberts, a senior vice president at Disney Television Animation said the series bears the "authentic voice" of Kline and "her family’s culture and values", saying the series will be aimed at kids and families.

In 2022, Kline stated that representation was one of the reasons she became an animator, and said it was "exciting" to be a voice for Latinos, and pictures her "niece and cousins", and thinks about "how they’d want to be represented." In March 2023, Kline told Animation Magazine that the series was inspired by an adult short she had created for an Upright Citizen’s Brigade stand-up comedy show in 2017, was inspired by Peanuts and Calvin and Hobbes, and said she loved working with the show's crew, praising their "intense passion, drive, and talent". The series aired half-hour episodes that are divided into 11-minute stories and premiered on Disney Channel.

In June 2023, the opening sequence of the series was released by Disney Branded Television, with a panned reception to the sequence on social media, including from Latinos and Mexicans. Kline stated that she created content based on her own experiences and later restricted her Instagram account. She also wrote on her Instagram that the backlash was traumatizing, and said, in a comic posted on her account, that it made her "doubt myself, my project, [and] my intentions." She later told The Hollywood Reporter that she hoped that people gave the series "a chance" despite the "knee-jerk reaction" to the introductory sequence of the series.

In an interview on June 16, 2023, Kline said the series is based on her personal experiences of growing up with a multicultural Mexican-American family in Los Angeles in the 1990s, being bicultural, biracial, and noted that the project's relatability attracted well-known individuals like Melissa Villaseñor. She also stated that Tater doesn't speak Spanish, which is why her grammar is incorrect, the importance of cousins in her life, and noted that the art style showcased the environment in L.A. She additionally hoped the series would make people proud of their roots. She later told interviewers, prior to the series premiere on July 25, 2024, that she wanted to "create relatable characters that are universally lovable", said that the characters had many layers, said that Tater goes through a story arc throughout the series, and noted that the series was inspired by movies by Sylvain Chomet, artistry by Willie Real, Calvin and Hobbes, and 101 Dalmatians. She also told Cartoon Brew that her first pitch was close to the final product, remarking that she was glad that Disney trusted her "vision from the beginning", noting how the show's "2D aesthetics" developed through the show's development, and saying that the show was script-driven but had "board artists...layer[ing] in their own comedy." The series released two episodes a week after its premiere, and streamed on Disney+.

Kline would hold a "creative key note" at the World Animation Summit, in November 2024, where she would be described as "creator of Disney TV’s new hit series, Primos." The same year she had been a guest at the Pixelatl Festival in Guadalajara, Mexico, held in September 2024.

In June 2025, it was confirmed that the Primos would not be returning for a second season and had ended production.

=== Other work ===
Kline was a character designer and storyboarder for Bojack Horseman in 2014 and a storyboarder and writer for Star vs. the Forces of Evil in 2015. In 2016, she would be a storyboarder for Pinky Malinky, Harvey Street Kids, and Too Loud. Kline would write and direct episodes of Home: Adventures with Tip & Oh from 2015 to 2017. In 2017, Kline worked as a character designer for the Hey Arnold!: The Jungle Movie, and was a storyboarder on The Lego Ninjago Movie.

In October 2017, Kline signed a letter to major animation studios along with other female animators, such as Rebecca Sugar, Sofia Alexander, and Shadi Petosky, calling for an end to sexual harassment in the animation industry, and calling for an anti-harassment committee within The Animation Guild.

Kline would be storyboarder for an episode of Ollie & Scoops in 2019 and storyboard for the animated short, Goldie.

In February 2026, it was reported that Natasha Kline is working on another series for Disney Television Animation alongside inking a overall development deal with Lucasfilm Animation.

== Personal life ==
Kline said in a July 2021 comic on Instagram that she was "not...straight" and implied she was gay. She supported the Disney walkout in March 2022 by LGBTQ Disney employees. She also stated that she opposed the Don't Say Gay Bill and called for action by Disney, stating that she writes "inclusive stories."

== Filmography ==
=== Film ===
Title	Year	Credited as			Ref/Notes
Title	Year	Writer	Producer	Animation/Art department	Ref/Notes
The Lego Ninjago Movie	2017	No	No	Yes	
Hey Arnold!: The Jungle Movie	2017	No	No	No	Character designer

=== Television ===
Title	Year	Credited as				Role	Ref/Notes
Title	Year	Writer	Storyboarder	Director	Executive producer	Role	Ref/Notes
South Park	2008–2014	No	Yes	No	No		Character designer
BoJack Horseman	2014	No	Yes	No	No		Character designer
Star vs. the Forces of Evil	2016	Yes	Yes	No	No		Episode: "Gift of the Card" (with Annisa Adjani)
Pinky Malinky	2016	No	Yes	No	No		
Home: Adventures with Tip & Oh	2016–2018	Yes	Yes	No	No		
Too Loud	2017	No	Yes	No	No		
Harvey Street Kids	2018	No	Yes	No	No		
Big City Greens	2018–2026	No	Yes	Yes	No		
Ollie & Scoops	2019	No	Yes	No	No		Episode: "Gimme a Hand" (with Andrea Joan Cabral)
Goldie	2019	No	Yes	No	No		
Primos	2024–2025	Yes	Yes	Yes	Yes	ChaCha, Gordita, and Additional Voices (voice)	Creator
Chibiverse	2025	No	No	No	No	ChaCha and Gordita (voice)	Episode: "Space Race"
