= Piotr Michael =

American voice actor and comedian

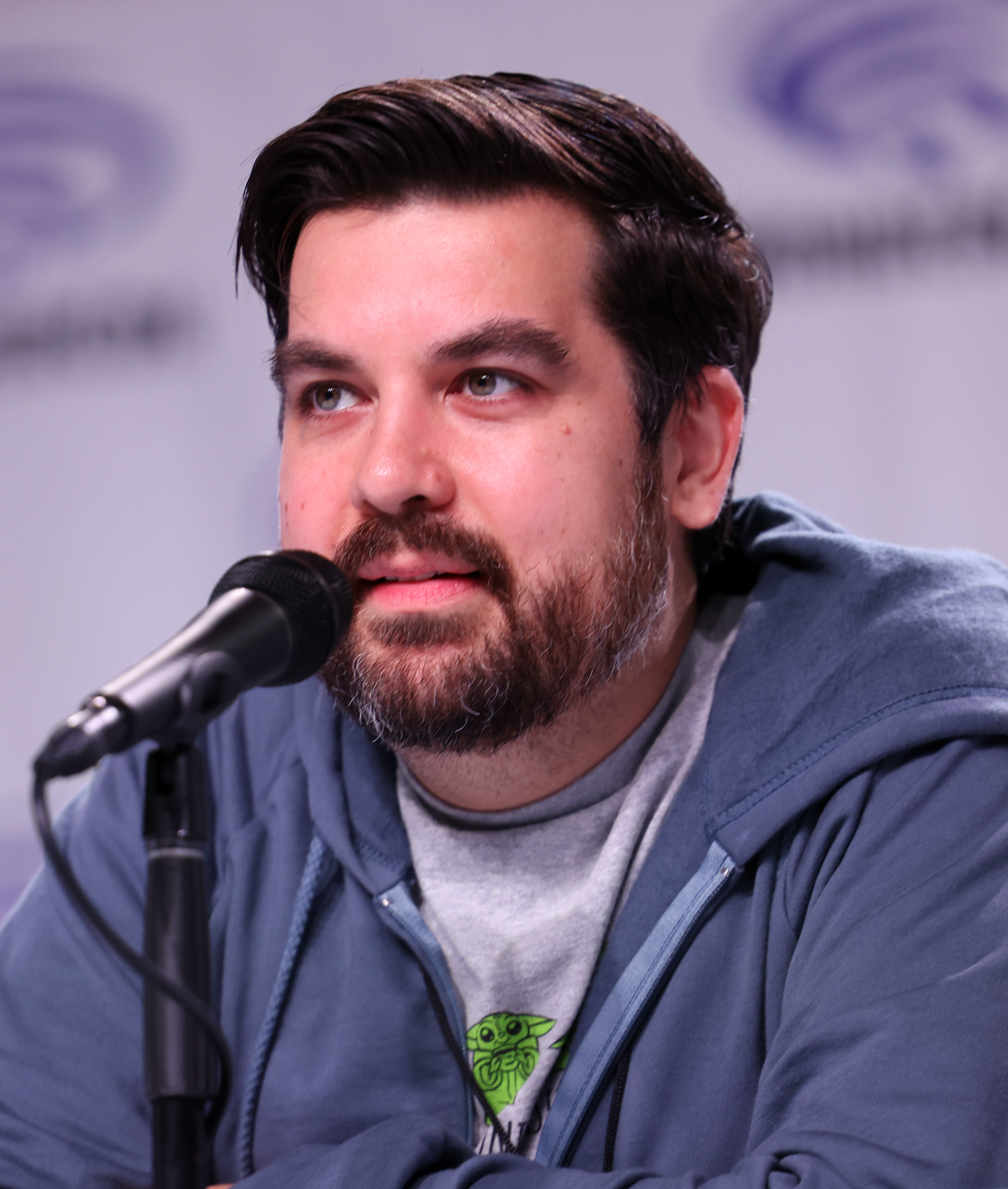
- Michael in 2026
- Born: Piotr Michael Walczuk; Los Angeles, California, U.S.
- Education: University of California, Los Angeles
- Occupations: Voice actor; comedian
- Years active: 2003–present

Piotr Michael Walczuk, known professionally as Piotr Michael, is an American voice actor and comedian. He is known for his role as Yoda in various Star Wars media, primarily the television series Star Wars: Young Jedi Adventures (2023–2025).

== Early life ==
Michael grew up in Cleveland, Ohio, and lived in Taos, New Mexico and Hilo, Hawaii until relocating to Los Angeles. He attended the University of Hawaii at Hilo, where he studied art and acting, and later improvisational comedy at The Groundlings.

== Career ==
In video games, he has voiced Spock in Star Trek: Resurgence, Phineas Welles in The Outer Worlds, Jason Hudson in Call of Duty: Black Ops Cold War, and the dual role of the Sentinel King and the Dark Lord in Doom Eternal.

While with the Groundlings, Michael performed in the comedy show Desperately Seeking Sunday.

In 2023, he voiced Yoda in the children's television series Star Wars: Young Jedi Adventures, and succeeded the late Gilbert Gottfried as the voice of Iago in the short film Once Upon a Studio to commemorate the centennial of The Walt Disney Company. He also voiced Randall Boggs and Jumba Jookiba in Disney Speedstorm, replacing both the late David Ogden Stiers and Jess Winfield in the latter role and even succeeded the late Fred Willard as the voice of Albert "Pop-Pop" Reynolds in The Loud House who was briefly voiced by Christopher Swindle in "Resident Upheaval" following Willard's death.

== Filmography ==
=== Film ===
Year	Title	Role	Notes
2014	29 Celebrity Impressions, 1 Original Song	Christopher Lloyd, Steve Buscemi, Bob Dylan, Jeff Goldblum, Gilbert Gottfried, Ian McKellen, Ray Romano	YouTube video
2015	First Impressions	Roger	Short film
2016	Lego Dimensions: Find that Hero!	Michael Knight	Short film
2016	Monster High: Great Scarrier Reef	Father Lagoona, Additional Voices	Direct-to-video
2019	Red Shoes and the Seven Dwarfs	Soldier A, Walla	English version
2020	Superman: Man of Tomorrow	Perry White	Direct-to-video
2020	Bill & Ted Face the Music	Rufus	
2021	Trollhunters: Rise of the Titans	Bellroc, Skrael	
2023	Taz: Quest for Burger	Lou, Stan	Direct-to-video
2023	Babylon 5: The Road Home	David Sheridan, Marcus Cole, Trudan	Direct-to-video
2023	Once Upon a Studio	Iago	Short film
2024	No Time to Spy	Albert "Pop-Pop" Reynolds, Boat Henchman, Karaoke Patron	
2024	The Wild Robot	Broadfoot, Weasels	
2025	Predator: Killer of Killers	Gunnar	
2025	KPop Demon Hunters	Additional Voices	
2025	Gabby's Dollhouse: The Movie	GPS	
2025	A Loud House Christmas Movie: Naughty or Nice	Santa Claus/Naughty Santa Claus, Mysterious Shopkeeper, Nutcracker Seller	
2026	Master of the Universe	Ship (voice)	
2026	Clash of the Thundermans	The Replicator (voice)	

=== Television ===
Year	Title	Role	Notes
2012	Mad	Harry Potter, Announcer, Concierge	Episode: "Potions 11"
2015	Pickle and Peanut	Bill, additional voices	Episode: "Pickle Adopts a Family"
2015–2016	Wander Over Yonder	Major Threat, Ms. Myrtle, Jeff, various voices	5 episodes
2016	Mad TV	Various	8 episodes; season 15
2017	Milo Murphy's Law	Additional voices	Episode: "Missing Milo"
2017	Justice League Action	Perry White, Kalibak	2 episodes
2017	Lady Dynamite	Bert	5 episodes
2018–2019	The Adventures of Rocky and Bullwinkle	Fearless Leader, Alpha Bro, additional voices	26 episodes
2018–2019	Kung Fu Panda: The Paws of Destiny	Master Oogway, Wing, Wong, additional voices	Recurring cast
2018–2019	Family Guy	Additional voices	Recurring cast
2019	Big Mouth	Siamese Twin	Episode: "My Furry Valentine"
2019–2021	Where's Waldo?	Fritz, Arfolomew, Henri, Bucky	Recurring cast
2020	Wizards: Tales of Arcadia	Bellroc (Male), Skrael	Recurring cast
2020	Animaniacs	Castle Guard No. 2, Shipmate No. 1	Episode: "How to Brain Your Dragon"
2021, 2025	Love, Death & Robots	Police Radio, Jharit, Investor	3 episodes
2021–2024	Star Trek: Discovery	Shuttle Computer	Recurring cast
2021–2024	What If...?	Dreykov, Additional Voices	Recurring cast, 8 episodes
2021	WandaVision	Strücker Watch Ad Narrator (uncredited)	Episode: "Don't Touch That Dial"
2021	Robot Chicken	Yoda, Wuher	Episode: "May Cause Episode Title to Cut Off Due to Word Lim"
2022	Kid Cosmic	Cosmobile, Doc Goomentarian	2 episodes
2022–present	The Loud House	Albert "Pop-Pop" Reynolds	Recurring cast
2022–2023	Mike Judge's Beavis and Butt-Head	Gilmore, Fire, additional voices	Recurring cast
2023–2024	Velma	Deputy Greg, additional voices	Recurring cast
2023	Bugs Bunny Builders	Prince Lionel	Episode: "Castle Hassle"
2023–2025	Star Wars: Young Jedi Adventures	Yoda	Main cast
2024–present	Grimsburg	Paul Giamatti, Garfield, various voices	Recurring cast
2024	Lego Star Wars: Rebuild the Galaxy	Yoda	
2024	Secret Level	Global Risk Sniper	Episode: "Crossfire: Good Conflict"
2024	Creature Commandos	Exuberant Host, Prosecuting Attorney, Son of Themyscira 1	Episode: "Cheers to the Tin Man"
2025	The Great North	Principal Bowtie Sr., Big Ray	Episodes: "Can't Hardly Debate Adventure" and "Cakeleration of Independence"
2025	Marvel Zombies	Khonshu, various voices	4 episodes
2026	Star Trek: Starfleet Academy	President Sadal's Voice Chip	Episode: "Beta Test"

=== Video games ===
Year	Title	Role
2015	Final Fantasy Type-0 HD	Concordian King
2016	Lego Dimensions	Michael Knight, Garthe Knight
2016	Doom	The Origin, Demonic Voice
2018	Call of Duty: Black Ops 4	Viktor Reznov, George Barkley, additional voices
2018	Spyro Reignited Trilogy	Bob the Flagkeeper, Basho the Firefly, Pete the Mountain Goat
2019	Kingdom Hearts III	Sarge
2019	Rage 2	Angus Groovy, additional voices
2019	The Outer Worlds	Phineas Welles
2020	Doom Eternal	UAC Scientists, King Novik, Dark Lord, Internal Voice
2020	Call of Duty: Black Ops Cold War	Jason Hudson
2021	Dungeons & Dragons: Dark Alliance	Murdunn
2021	Psychonauts 2	Otto, Tooth Fairy, Hippo Pot, Propagandaneer
2022	Evil Dead: The Game	Lord Arthur
2022	Diablo Immortal	Additional voices
2022	Call of Duty: Modern Warfare II	Additional voices
2023, 2025	Disney Speedstorm	Randall Boggs, Jumba Jookiba, Carl Fredricksen
2023	Star Trek: Resurgence	Spock
2023	Diablo IV	Additional voices
2023	Starfield	Briggs
2023	PAW Patrol World	Mr. Porter
2023	Spider-Man 2	Additional voices
2023	Hellboy Web of Wyrd	Tsar Vodyanik
2023	DreamWorks All-Star Kart Racing	Lord Farquaad
2023	Nickelodeon All-Star Brawl 2	Clockwork
2023	Asgard's Wrath 2	Viggo
2024	Final Fantasy VII Rebirth	Mayor Zander
2024	Batman: Arkham Shadow	Sebastian
2025	Doom: The Dark Ages	King Novik
2025	Mafia: The Old Country	Father Saverio Clemente
2025	Dune Awakening	Feyd-Rautha Harkonnen, The Glutton, Selon Varlin, Myr Charki, Ilyich Hannivar
2025	The Outer Worlds 2	Archivist Turnwater
2026	The Elder Scrolls Online	Baron-Captain Olsien Guy Mard

=== Web series ===
Year	Title	Role	Notes
2015	JonTron's StarCade	George Lucas	Episode: "The Star Wars Holiday Special (FINALE)"
2017	Too Loud	Quincy Kibblesworth	Episode: "Beware the Big Headed Boy"
2019	Ollie & Scoops	Principal J. Liquids	Episode: "Student of the Month"
2021	Long Gone Gulch	Squatch, Pinchley	
2021	Yuki 7	Goldpaws, Rocket Turtle, Hammerheads	3 episodes
2025–present	Strawberry Vampire	Zoly, Mr. Harvey	
