= Too Loud =

American animated web series

- Created by: Nico Colaleo
- Written by: Nico Colaleo
- Directed by: Nico Colaleo
- Voices of: Piotr Michael; Gregg Turkington
- Theme music composer: Dave Neff
- Country of origin: United States
- Original language: English
- No. of seasons: 2
- No. of episodes: 16

Production
- Executive producer: Birkner Rawlings
- Running time: 5 minutes
- Production company: DreamWorksTV

Original release
- Network: YouTube
- Release: July 9, 2017 – November 20, 2019

Too Loud! is an American animated web series created by Nico Colaleo for DreamWorksTV. The series premiered on the DreamWorksTV YouTube channel (now Universal Kids) on July 9, 2017. A second and final season premiered on September 18, 2019; the final episode was uploaded on November 20, 2019.

== Premise ==
Too Loud! centers around Desirée (Note: Desirée is called "Jeffrey" for much of the series.) and Sara, two siblings who volunteer at the Chestertown Public Library, where their large heads and loud voices occasionally result in mishaps. Through all of this, they have fun and get their jobs done.

== Voice cast ==
=== Main ===
- Kelsy Abbott as Sara, the older sister of Jeffrey/Desirée who is often referred to as "Sara with No H" because of the similarity between her and Sarah's names.
- Nico Colaleo as Jeffrey/Desirée, the younger sibling of Sara. Initially introduced as Sara's brother, Jeffrey comes out as a transgender girl while crossdressing in the season 2 episode "Slumber Party Sneak-In", adopting her alias, Desirée. The latter name is the character's intended one, according to Colaleo.
- Gregg Turkington as Mildred "Miz" Abbott, an elderly librarian at Chestertown Public Library who is the supervisor of Sara and Jeffrey.

=== Supporting ===
- James Urbaniak as Mr. Gregory
- Chris Dotson as the Mayor, the unnamed mayor of Chestertown.
- Rich Evans III as Logan
- Matt Brailey as Patrick and Male Future Citizen
- Emily Brundige as Molly, a friend of Jeffrey and Sara. Colaleo later confirmed that Molly and Rachael are in a romantic relationship.
- Rachael Russakoff as Rachael, a friend of Jeffrey/Desirée and Sara, who is in a romantic relationship with Molly.
- Piotr Michael as Quincy Kibblesworth
- Julia Vickerman as Sarah, a volunteer librarian at the Chestertown Public Library who is often called "Sarah with an H" or "Regular Sarah" to distinguish her from Sara. She made her first appearance in the episode "New Girl in Town". The character was later voiced by Vivienne Medrano.
- Joel Trussell as Clancy Abbott
- Candi Milo as Polly Bretzel
- Lynn Wang as Lynn
- Sia Mistry as Jameela
- Haley Mancini as C*LACIOUS and Texting Girl
- Erika Paget as Spud
- Lindsay Ames as Wedge, Muriel Abbott
- Adam McArthur as Hilarious Larry
- Michael Ruocco as Phillip
- Mike Stoklasa as Logan's Dad
- Jack Packard as Steven
- Minty Lewis as Mrs. Mooney
- Paul Rugg as Dr. Lewis, a dentist who appears in "The Incredibly Shrinking Head".

== Episodes ==
Season	Episodes	Originally released	
Season	Episodes	First released	Last released
1	6	July 9, 2017	August 13, 2017
2	10	September 18, 2019	November 20, 2019

=== Season 1 (2017) ===
All episodes in this season were written by Nico Colaleo.

No. overall	No. in season	Title	Original release date
1	1	"Loud Mouth Librarians"	July 9, 2017
Two siblings, Sara and Jeffrey, try to help a patron named Mr. Gregory find a particular book.
2	2	"No Talking Allowed!"	July 16, 2017
Irritated with the siblings being louder than him, the mayor threatens to close the library if they continue talking loudly. This results in the siblings attempting to avoid talking all day, much to the inconvenience of library patrons. Later, when the mayor unveils a new stop sign, the siblings notice a car with a distracted driver approaching the intersection from behind the mayor and shout, saving his life.
3	3	"You Can't Play with Us"	July 23, 2017
When team commander Logan excludes Sara from playing a sci-fi roleplaying game called Phasers + Lasers with his friends Rachael, Molly and Patrick for being "loud and obnoxious", the siblings agree to play a trial game against Logan, whose attempt at cheating leads to the siblings discovering that he had torn off one of the pages from the game's rulebook, which states that no player can outrank another.
4	4	"Beware the Big-Headed Boy"	July 30, 2017
Jeffrey is unsure about being able to attend Quincy Kibblesworth's book signing event because his head would be too large to fit through the door to the room that Kibblesworth is signing in, and Jeffrey is worried that Kibblesworth might think he is a loser because of that. After trying to figure out how to make his head smaller, Sara puts Jeffrey's head inside a goldfish bowl, which works until it breaks in front of Kibblesworth. The size of Jeffrey's head amazes Kibblesworth, who gets inspired to write another Dishwasher's Guide to the Universe book titled Attack of the Giant-Headed Space Boy.
5	5	"New Girl in Town"	August 6, 2017
The siblings meet a new volunteer librarian named Sarah. Sara attempts to help a patron find a copy of Canterbury Tales, but Sarah steps in and does a better job at helping him, causing Sara to become resentful of her.
6	6	"Snowed In"	August 13, 2017
When Jeffrey learns that the Chestertown Winter Festival is in five minutes, he shouts "Snow party!" loudly, causing the library to be buried under a mountain of snow, making himself, Sara and Miz Abbott unable to exit the building. By the time Jeffrey manages to lick his way through the snow in front of the entrance, it becomes apparent that he, Sara and Miz Abbott are in the year 3050 AD and that the mountain of snow has been named Abbott's Hill.

=== Season 2 (2019) ===
No. overall	No. in season	Title	Written by	Original release date
7	1	"Weenie War"	Ashley Palmer	September 18, 2019
At the Chestertown Food Fair, Sara helps Patrick sell sausages whilst competing against his rival Polly Bretzel.
8	2	"Slumber Party Sneak-In"	Nico Colaleo	September 25, 2019
Plotting with Sarah, Jeffrey dresses up as a girl named Desirée in order to go to a slumber party. When the rest of the girls find out that Desirée is Jeffrey and that he enjoys being a girl after all, they console him, accept him, and decide they like him regardless of his gender identity.
9	3	"Bad Gurlz Do It Better"	Ashley Palmer	October 2, 2019
Sara meets two girls nicknamed Spud and Wedge, who she subsequently hangs out with until they attempt to convince her to let them use her head to prevent their planned egging and toilet papering of the library from being caught on the security camera.
10	4	"Gimme That Frog"	Ashley Palmer	October 9, 2019
When Jeffrey finds an ultra-rare toy called Cheese Frog, he makes Sara and Sarah compete in a series of contests to obtain it to complete their toy collections, but they later get tired of competing and compromise by merging their collections together.
11	5	"Save the Library!"	Matt Brailey	October 16, 2019
On the 100th anniversary of the library's founding, Miz Abbott's twin sister Muriel pays a visit to remind her that she is selling the deed to the library to Phillip from the company Parking Lots Etcetera.
12	6	"Checked Out"	Nico Colaleo	October 23, 2019
Jeffrey, Sara, and Sarah attempt to recover a library book titled Juggle Your Way to Success: A Self-Help Book, which was checked out eight years prior and never returned. They try to get into Logan's house in order to reclaim his copy, only to find out that his father had purchased it for him as a birthday gift and that the actual library book had been inside of Jeffrey all along.
13	7	"Molly Is Missing!"	Emily Brundige	October 30, 2019
Jeffrey and Sara venture into a dark area in the library called the Stacks to look for Molly. After finding her, they try to run from another creature, who turns out to just be Jeffrey and Sara's long-lost cousin Steven.
14	8	"Besties or Else"	Justin Charlebois	November 6, 2019
Jeffrey and Sara attempt to compete against Molly and Rachael at the 19th Annual Friendship-Con.
15	9	"The Incredibly Shrinking Head"	Matt Brailey	November 13, 2019
After receiving head reduction surgery from a dentist, Jeffrey and Sara find that their hearing is much more sensitive. Furthermore, Sara can no longer locate books like she used to, Jeffrey has developed an aversion to his own toadstool sandwiches, and he can no longer check out library books by licking people's library cards anymore. They decide to go back to have the procedure undone, but find that the dentist's office had been abandoned for years. In the end, however, it is revealed that the episode has been taking place in a bad dream.
16	10	"Run, Sara, Run!"	Matt Brailey	November 20, 2019
After Sara accidentally destroys a birthday cake she was making for Jeffrey, she runs out to the bakery to get him another one, but learns that the last one had already been sold to another customer. She attempts to chase the customer who bought it, but after the customer gets away by entering a sewer, she kicks a fire hydrant, causing it to spray water at her, launching her into the air and into a mail delivery truck, resulting in her being inside the last present that Jeffrey would open.

== Production and release ==
Production on the series began as early as January 2017.

The series premiered on the YouTube channel for DreamWorksTV on July 9, 2017 and was renewed for a second season on September 8, 2017. The second season made its LA premiere on January 12, 2019 and YouTube premiere on September 18, 2019. In February 2021, Colaleo revealed that the series was a stepping stone to Ollie & Scoops, giving him showrunning experience, that he came up with the series specifically for DreamWorks and that if he had waited one or two years, the series wouldn't have happened at all. He also noted that he had to accept notes from a producer, and said that while he had ideas for more seasons, DreamWorks only agreed to two seasons.

In a January 2022 interview, Colaleo, the show's creator, noted that he learned from Too Loud! to have a more diverse cast, stated that each episode is about five minutes long, and said that he made the mayor of the town a "David Lynch cameo caricature". He also described the show as about kindness, like his other show Ollie & Scoops, and noted that DreamWorks paid for Too Loud!, not him, like with Ollie & Scoops. Colaleo also was the art director for the series.

Vivienne Medrano, creator of Hazbin Hotel and Helluva Boss worked as an animator on the show. She called her experience on the series "a delight." She also worked as a character designer on the series.

Marie Lum and Ashley Nichols were additional animators for the show. Additionally, Ethan C. Harper was a character cleanup artist for the first season of the series and Natasha Kline was a storyboarder.

The series was later added to Amazon Prime.

== Reception and legacy ==
Reception of this series has been relatively positive. Owl Fisher and Fox Fisher, in The Guardian, called the show quirky and fast-paced. They also argued that the show, in its second season, makes coming out as trans, appear rewarding and positive, giving children an "insight into the lives of transgender kids and teenagers," helping teenagers and transgender kids "feel seen and supported." Another review by librarian Burkely Hermann, in I Love Libraries, described the series as a show that those of all ages can enjoy, especially "its message about the value of libraries." In later reviews, the same person compared the series to libraries and librarians, in Mira, Royal Detective and Welcome to the Wayne.

Vivienne Medrano, who worked on the series as an animator and character designer, described her experience on Too Loud as a "delight". Another animator for the series, Ashley Nichols, has worked as an animator on Colaleo's Ollie & Scoops and on the pilot episode of Medrano's own series, Hazbin Hotel. Emily Brundige, the voice of Molly, went on to create Goldie for Apple TV+.

In September 2019, series creator Nico Colaleo described the episode "Slumber Party Sneak-In" as important, arguing that it was his favorite episode of the show's second season, and a "pro-transgender episode." It was later revealed that the episode was supposed to be the final episode of the series, but DreamWorks had posted it too soon.
