= Adam McArthur =

American actor

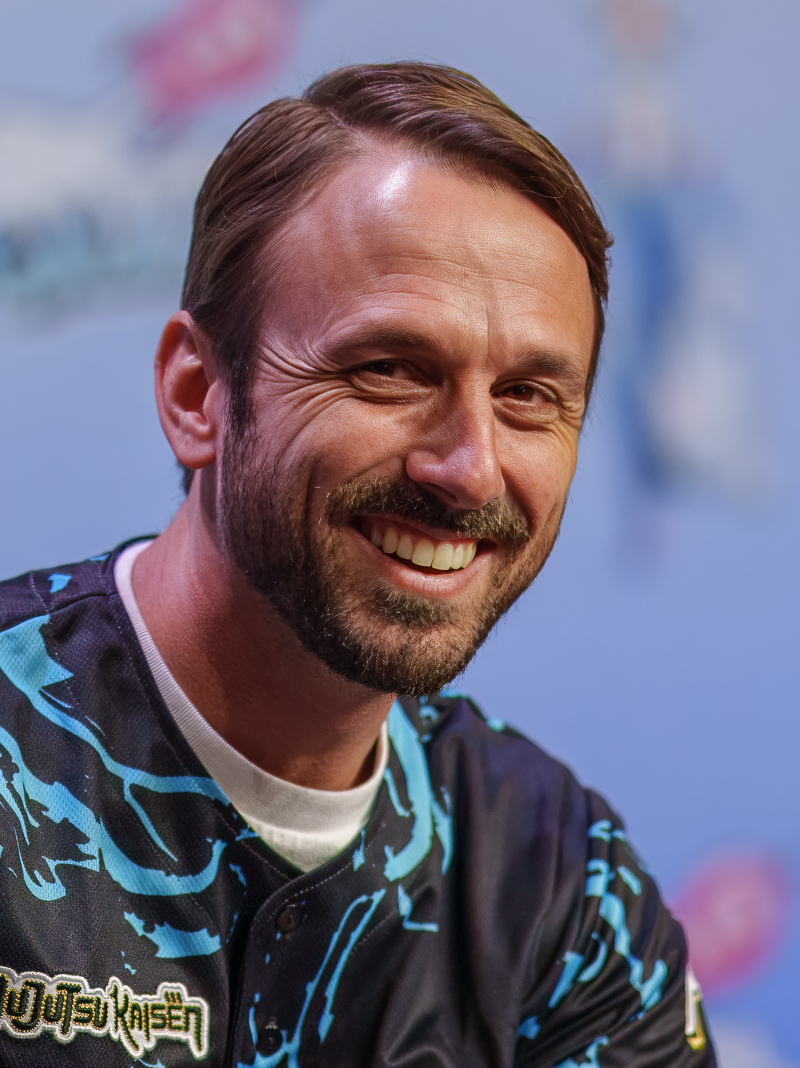
- McArthur at the 2025 GalaxyCon San Jose
- Education: Pepperdine University
- Occupation: Actor
- Years active: 2002–present
- Website: www.adam-mcarthur.com

Adam McArthur is an American actor. His best-known role is voicing Marco Diaz in Star vs. the Forces of Evil, Prince Lee-Char in Star Wars: The Clone Wars, Ricky and Patrick in Shadows House, Hanabata Kōkū in My Hero Academia, Yuri in Sakugan, Chifuyu Matsuno in Tokyo Revengers, and Yuji Itadori in Jujutsu Kaisen. He also voices characters on other animation shows, and on-screen on some nationally aired commercials. In martial arts, he specializes in kung fu, has been a champion at some tournaments, and has been the featured subject of several documentaries that have aired on PBS.

== Biography ==
McArthur grew up in Pinole, California, in the San Francisco Bay Area. He graduated from Pepperdine University in 2005 with a degree in Acting and Television Production, and has worked with improv groups in the Los Angeles area. As a martial artist, he specializes in Wushu kung fu, and other forms such as judo. He started when he was 11. In 2003, he was an All Around Grand Champion in the Adult Male Traditional category at the UC Berkeley Chinese Martial Arts Tournament. In 2006, he was selected for the documentary Kung Fu: Journey to the East where he and fellow martial arts practitioner Kristi Jordan visited China to learn from martial arts experts and perform at a stage presentation at the Shaolin Temple. The show was broadcast on PBS. He would return in 2014 for another PBS-broadcast documentary called Shaolin Kung Fu Monks where he follows the group as they go on a worldwide tour with stops in Moscow, New York City, and Los Angeles.

McArthur's first major role in animation voice-over was in Star vs. the Forces of Evil, which premiered as one of the top animated shows on the Disney XD channel (which he would later become the announcer for), and which was ordered for a second season ahead of its regular broadcast of the first season. He voices Marco Diaz, a teenage boy whose family hosts the title character as an exchange student, and who becomes her partner in their adventures. Daron Nefcy said he brings something special to the character, making Marco charming as well as smart and aware of the world around him. He voiced in the series Star Wars: The Clone Wars as Mon Cala Prince Lee-Char for a story arc in season 4. In an interview with TheForce.net, McArthur said he used his regular voice for his character.

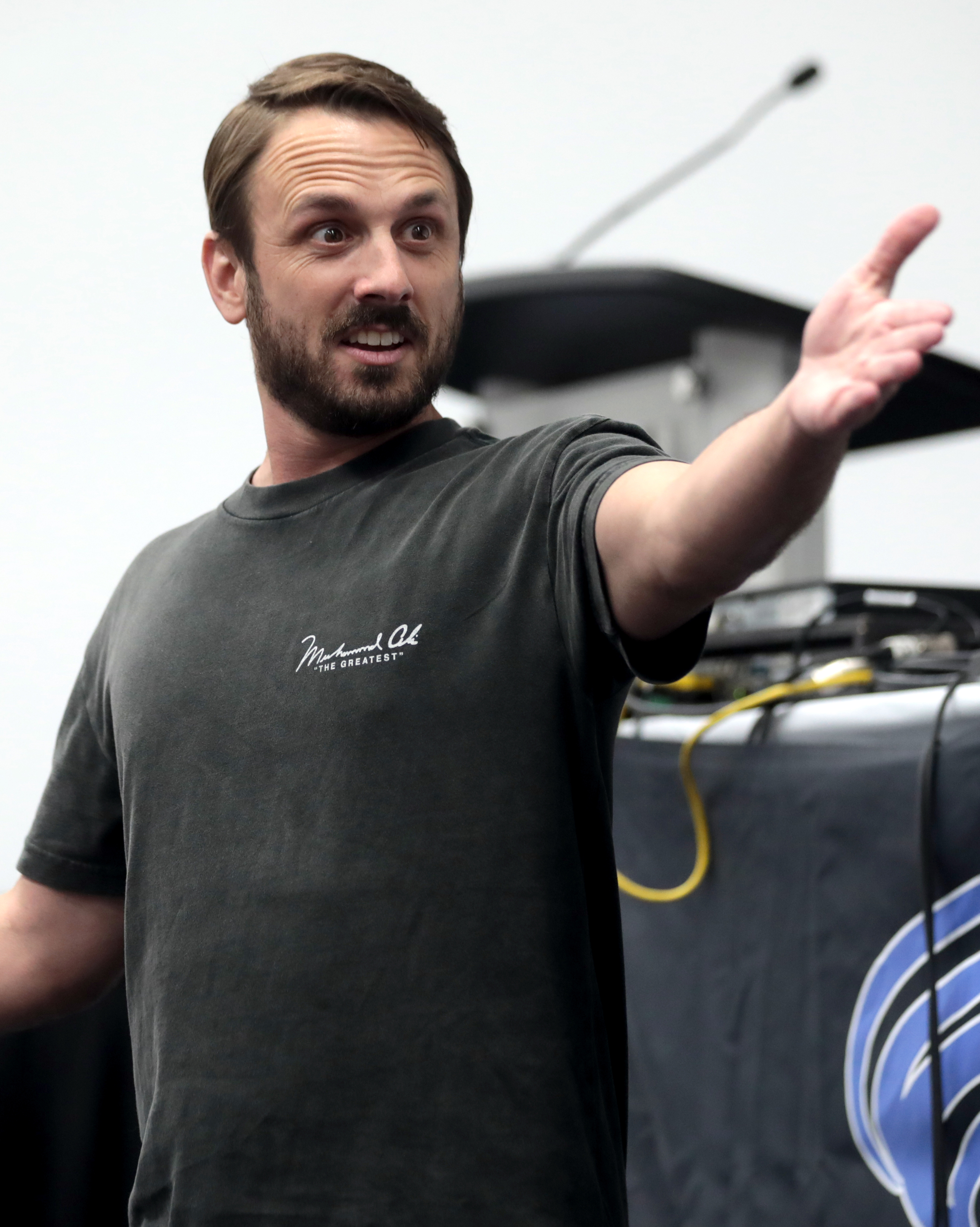
Adam McArthur at the 2022 WonderCon

McArthur was involved in theater throughout high school and college, and has worked at ComedySportz in Los Angeles as part of their improv team. In 2015, he starred in an Audi commercial called "The Scripted Life" which aired during the 2015 Emmy Awards and was also nominated for several awards among film festivals and advertising critics. In 2022, McArthur was nominated for Best VA Performance (EN) at the Crunchyroll Anime Awards for his performance as Yuji Itadori in Jujutsu Kaisen.

== Personal life ==
McArthur is married to Kim. They have a small business involving photo booths that was advertised on The Knot.

== Filmography ==
=== Live-action ===
Year	Title	Role	Notes	Source
2004	Motocross Kids	Male reporter		
2004	Jack & Bobby	The Track Guy	Episode: "Chess Lessons"	
2006	Kung Fu: Journey to the East	Himself	Documentary, featured subject	
2009	El Dorado	Jack Thompson		
2010	Scooby-Doo! Spooky Camp Stories	Counselor Cooper		
2014	Shaolin Kung Fu Monks	Himself	Documentary, featured subject	
2015	"The Scripted Life"	Carl	Audi television commercial	
2015	Krampus	Gingerbread Men		

=== Animation ===
Year	Title	Role	Notes	Source
2002	Phantom Investigators	Max	Episode: "Ghosts on Film"	
2011	The LeBrons	Erik		
2011	Star Wars: The Clone Wars	Mon Cala Prince Lee-Char	3 episodes	
2015	The Adventures of Puss in Boots	Chad	Episode: "Brothers"	
2015–2019	Star vs. the Forces of Evil	Marco Diaz		
2019	Ollie & Scoops	Rudy		
2019	Too Loud	Hilarious Larry		
2020	Big City Greens	Ashton		
2020	Hailey's On It!	Scott Denoga	(Pilot only as Scott Ferderman)	
2021	S.A.L.E.M.	Oliver		
2024–present	Chibiverse	Marco Diaz		
2025	Homestuck: The Animated Pilot	Dave Strider		
2026	Theme Song Takeover	Marco Diaz	Episode: "Ludo Takes over the Star vs. the Forces Of Evil Theme Song"	

=== Anime ===
Year	Title	Role	Notes	Source
2020–present	Jujutsu Kaisen	Yuji Itadori		
2021–2022	Shadows House	Ricky/Patrick		
2021	My Hero Academia	Koku Hanabata/Trumpet		
2021	The Saint's Magic Power is Omnipotent	Kyle Salutania		
2021–present	Tokyo Revengers	Chifuyu Matsuno		
2021	Sakugan	Yuri		
2022	Sing a Bit of Harmony	Prince		
2022	The Orbital Children	Taiyo Tsukuba		
2022	Fruits Basket: Prelude	Teacher		
2022	Goodbye, Don Glees!	Rōma Kamogawa		
2023	Bungo Stray Dogs	Saigiku Jouno		
2023	The First Slam Dunk	Sota Miyagi		
2024–present	Kaiju No. 8	Reno Ichikawa		

=== Video games ===
Year	Title	Role	Notes	Source
2015	Final Fantasy Type-0 HD	Joker	English dub	
2018	Far Cry 5		Credited under Additional Thanks	
2022	Ghostwire: Tokyo	Man A, Boy B	English dub	
2024	Jujutsu Kaisen: Cursed Clash	Yuji Itadori	English dub	
2024	WWE 2K24	Troy Simpkin		
2024	Sand Land	Additional voices	English dub	
2025	WWE 2K25	Troy Simpkin		
2025	Date Everything!	Cam		
