= Primos (TV series) =

Animated Disney series

- Genre: Comedy; Coming of age
- Created by: Natasha Kline
- Directed by: Eden Riegel
- Voices of: Myrna Velasco; Melissa Villaseñor; Michelle Ortiz; Jim Conroy; Angélica María; Elizabeth Grullón; Jonathan Melo; Rick Simon; Cristina Vee Valenzuela; Natasha Kline; Nomi Ruiz; Becca Q. Co; Ryan Anderson Lopez; Sarah Tubert
- Theme music composer: Alana Da Fonseca and Bobby Studley
- Opening theme: "Primos Main Title Theme" (written by Alana Da Fonseca, Bobby Studley, and Natasha Kline)
- Ending theme: "Primos End Credits Song" (composed by Jim Lang) "City of Angels" (written by Alana Da Fonseca and Bobby Studley)
- Composer: Jim Lang
- Country of origin: United States
- Original language: English
- No. of seasons: 1
- No. of episodes: 28 (55 segments)

Production
- Executive producer: Natasha Kline
- Producer: Philip M. Cohen
- Editor: Andrew Sorcini
- Running time: 22 minutes
- Production company: Disney Television Animation

Original release
- Network: Disney Channel
- Release: July 25, 2024 – April 27, 2025

Primos (Note: Spanish for "cousins") is an American animated television series created by Natasha Kline and produced by Disney Television Animation that aired on Disney Channel from July 25, 2024, to April 27, 2025.

In June 2025, it was confirmed that the series would not be returning for a second season and had ended production.

== Synopsis ==
The series centers around a large Mexican-American family living in the Los Angeles suburb of Hacienda Hills. Told through the diary of 9-year-old (later 10-year-old) Tater Ramírez-Humphrey, the series follows her as she discovers the "it factor" that makes her special, alongside her cousins, Cousin Bud, Big Nacho, Lita, Tere, Tabi, Toñita, Scooter, LotLot, Gordita, Nachito, ChaCha, and Lucita, who move in with her for the summer as she tries to figure out her "final form".

== Voice cast ==
=== Main ===
- Myrna Velasco as Patricia "Tater" Ramírez-Humphrey, the series' 9-year-old (later 10-year-old) protagonist with colorful braces and a lateral lisp who is trying to figure out her "final form". She cannot speak Spanish much like the rest of her family but is learning fluent French.
- Melissa Villaseñor as Eleanor "Nellie" Ramírez-Humphrey, Tater's younger but taller and more realistic, cynical, condescending, and lazy sister.
- Michelle Ortiz as Beatriz "Bibi" Ramírez-Humphrey, Tater's cheerful and optimistic mother who is an expert artist and sculptor.
- Jim Conroy as:
  - Bud Humphrey Sr., Tater's father who is skeptical of Tater's big dreams. He is an expert handyman. Like Tater, Bud is also not good at Spanish. He speaks in a Southern accent.
  - Vision Tiger, a talking tiger and Tater's imaginary friend who helps her plan her visions.
- Angélica María as Margarita Beatriz "Buela" Ramírez, Tater's maternal grandmother and an expert cook, who is annoyed that some of her family members cannot speak Spanish fluently.
- Elizabeth Grullón as Julita "Lita" Perez, Tater's Mexican-Dominican eldest cousin and Scooter and Lucita's older sister, who is bisexual, dreams of becoming a rock star, and does various odd jobs.
- Jonathan Melo as Isauro "Scooter" Perez, Lita and Lucita's shy Mexican-Dominican brother, good at ice-skating, playing wind instruments, and sewing.
- Rick Simon as:
  - Cousin Bud Humphrey, an eco-friendly teenager and Gordita's older brother who is always barefoot. The episode "Summer of Breaking Bud" revealed that Cousin Bud used to have a capitalist side named Cousin Buck.
  - Ignacio "Big Nacho" Ramírez III, a burly teenager who has a habit of roughhousing and is into weightlifting. He is also dyslexic.
- Cristina Vee Valenzuela as:
  - Teresa "Tere" Ramírez, the middle child of the acrobatic T-Sisters, who dream of being famous. She has a pink butterfly-shaped birthmark on her left eye.
  - Antoñia "Toñita" Ramírez, the youngest of the acrobatic T-Sisters who wants to be an archaeologist. She has two dimples on her cheeks.
- Natasha Kline as:
  - Heather "Gordita" Humphrey, Cousin Bud's younger sister. As the more intelligent of Tater's cousins, she loves performing scientific experiments.
  - Isabel Christina "ChaCha" Ramírez, a wild young girl who is mostly only capable of saying her name.
- Nomi Ruiz as Tabitha "Tabi" Ramírez, the oldest of the acrobatic T-Sisters. She takes great care of her two younger sisters and has a beauty mark on the right side of her face.
- Becca Q. Co as Charlotte "LotLot" Ramírez, a creepy and macabre girl who has a dark sense of humor and a interest in the supernatural and occult. She is Filipina-Mexican American.
- Ryan Anderson Lopez as Gabriel Ignacio "Nachito" Ramírez, Big Nacho's younger brother who looks up to him. Like his brother, shows symptoms of dyslexia.
- Sarah Tubert as Luz "Lucita" Perez, Tater's 3-year-old cousin who is Mexican-Dominican. She is Lita and Scooter's younger sister. She wears cochlear implants and knows American Sign Language.

=== Recurring ===
- Cristina Milizia as "Baby" Bud Ramírez-Humphrey Jr., Tater's infant brother.
- Cheech Marin as Ignacio "Pop" Ramírez Sr., Tater's maternal grandfather and Buela's husband with a golden tooth who is often seen either napping in his chair or engaging in romance with Buela.
- Joel "The Kid Mero" Martinez as Diego Perez, Lita, Scooter and Lucita's father, Bibi and Bud's brother-in-law, Rita's husband, and Tater's uncle with a paranoid and nervous personality.
- Mark Consuelos as Ivan Ramírez, a firefighter who is Tere, Tabi and Toñita's father, Ignacio Sr. and Buela's son, Bibi's brother, Silvia's husband, and Tater's uncle.
- Ricardo Chavira as Ignacio Ramírez Jr., Big Nacho and Nachito's father, Ignacio Sr. and Buela's son, Bibi's brother, and Tater's uncle with a dull personality, takes an interest in baseball, and is revealed to be divorced.
- Gabriel Iglesias as Gustavo Ramírez, a one-armed mortician who is LotLot's father, Ignacio Sr. and Buela's son, Bibi's brother, Cherry's husband, and Tater's uncle.
- Dee Bradley Baker as:
  - Chuchi, a three-legged outdoor dog that Tater befriends.
  - Garage Possum, an opossum that lives in the Ramírez-Humphrey family's garage and gets caught up in the Ramírez-Humphrey family's shenanigans.
  - Jean-Cluck Van Fried, a buff chicken with a featherless left wing who is owned by Buela and protects the family's chicken flock.
- Jorge Diaz as:
  - Skid "The Skid" Malfeo, the obnoxious and disrespectful neighbor of the Ramírez-Humphrey family who wears a pair of white briefs with pockets and is always barefoot. His family is just as obnoxious as he is.
  - La Hamaca, a being behind the hammock that makes Pop weary of it.
- Liza Koshy as Serena, a girl who becomes Tater's best friend upon her family moving to Hacienda Hills due to their mutual fandom of Romancimorphs and Oui, Oui Marie.
- Maya Morales as Gwennifer Malfeo, The Skid's bratty older sister who is a Pigeon Scout, the ringleader of her scout troop, and Tater's arch-enemy. Unlike her family, she is less obnoxious and also harbors a secret crush on Cousin Bud.

Another recurring character is Hector, the local street vendor of different foods who never utters a word and is said to be fluent in Spanish and French.

=== Guest ===
- Sherry Cola as Ms. Mahoney, the librarian of Hacienda Hills Library who is familiar with sign language.
- Sarah Sherman as Carmela, Big Nacho's pen pal with braces and classic-length hair who has the same traits as him.
- Eden Riegel as:
  - N.K. Scheinhorn, the writer of the Romancimorphs series.
  - Caroline Malfeo, the mother of The Skid and Gwennifer.
  - The snobby mother of Richie who has let her infant son participate in the Fresadena Baby Races in "The Summer of the Baby Races".
- Silver Paul as Bootleg Vision Tiger, a deformed counterpart of Vision Tiger that Tater encountered on a menu she tried to improvise as her missing diary.
- Joe Hernandez as Blaine Himbo, an office worker who is a mutual friend of Tater and Lita.
- Blu del Barrio as Alex, Lita's co-worker at Quakey's Pizza Place who is also her enbyfriend. They are non-binary and use they/them pronouns. They had a mother named Mercedes.
- Jaime Jarrín as the Día de la Cultura Announcer
- Margo Rey as Rita Ramírez, a perfectionist mechanic who is Lita, Scooter, and Lucita's mother, Bibi's sister, Diego's wife, and Tater's aunt.
- Fryda Wolff as Pacheco, one of Gwennifer's friends in the Pigeon Scouts.
- Alex Cazares as Peña, one of Gwennifer's friends in the Pigeon Scouts.
- Felipe Esparza as a churro in Tater's fantasy
- Valeria Rodriguez as Patricia Platas, Tater's great-grandmother who she visits in a dream.
- Kyle MacLachlan as Bill, a patriotic worker at the United States Department of State.

Also in the series is Javier Ramírez, ChaCha's father, Ignacio Sr. and Buela's son, Marisol's husband, Tater's uncle, and Bibi's brother who is a biker and has no speaking role. Ivan and Gustavo's wives, named Silvia and Cherry respectively, also make non-speaking appearances in the series finale. The family tree in the same finale showed the pictures of not only ChaCha's mother and Javier's wife Marisol, but also Cousin Bud and Gordita's parents: mother Eleanor and father Felipe.

== Episodes ==
No.	Title	Directed by	Written by	Storyboard by	Original release date	Prod. code	U.S. viewers (millions)
1	"Summer of Tater"	Natasha Kline	Natasha Kline	Citlalli Anderson & Silver Paul	July 25, 2024	101	N/A
1	"Summer of Primos"	David C. Smith	Karla Sakas Shropshire	Ainsley Dye & Jackson Read	July 25, 2024	101	N/A
Tater Ramírez-Humphrey plans to spend the entire summer discovering what her "final form" will be, despite the cynicism of her younger sister Nellie and the indifference of the rest of her family. She gets the shock of her life when her mother Bibi announces that her 12 cousins ("primos"), consisting of Cousin Bud, Big Nacho, Lita, Tere, Tabi, Toñita, Scooter, LotLot, Gordita, Nachito, ChaCha, and Lucita, will be staying with them for the summer, devastating her. Uncomfortable with sharing a room with her cousins, Tater tries to get them to sign room contracts to avoid them messing up her room. However, the Primos disagree with the arrangement as Nellie blends in with her father and uncles Diego, Ivan, Ignacio, and Gustavo. When Tater refuses to give them their items until they meet her demands, they steal her room. Eventually, however, they decide to provide Tater with her own space so she can have some private time, reconciling Tater with the primos as they play a board game called "Diplomats & Domains" that attracts the other adults who noticed the messy hall. Tater and the primos compete against a disguised Nellie and the adults in "Diplomats & Domains" where the losers clean the hallway.
2	"Summer of Quehaceres"	David C. Smith	Rosemary Contreras	Alayna Cabral & Celestino Marina	July 25, 2024	102	N/A
2	"Summer of La Muñeca"	Jenn Strickland	Mikki Crisostomo	Eddie West & Cassie Zwart	July 25, 2024	102	N/A
Tater wants to work on her vision board, but is told that she must do house chores. While Nellie does the easier job and Bibi does the entertainment, Tater finds herself doing most of the hard work. Tater plans to completely shirk her chores until she overhears her stressed mother being thankful for her help. Tater decides to resume work, until she learns that the primos themselves are very handy. Tater creates a chore wheel so that all the primos can help out. When Bibi learns that Tater was making a vision board, she gives her her arts and crafts supplies. Wanting some privacy, Tater discovers that the primos are afraid of LotLot's cursed doll Dolly. Tater asks to "play" with her and LotLot agrees, though she gives her some rules to follow. Soon, Tater begins to suspect that the doll really is cursed and runs over to Buela's house to have it exorcised. They soon learn that LotLot was messing with Tater by making it look like the doll was cursed when it really wasn't. Tater and LotLot admit that they like having personal space and agree to spend more time alone together.
3	"Summer of Los Diez"	David C. Smith	Diego Salazar Castro	Ainsley Dye & Jackson Read	July 27, 2024 (Note: This episode was first released on Disney+ on July 26, 2024.)	103	N/A
3	"Summer of Lit-Tater-atura"	Jenn Strickland	Edlin Ortiz	Citlalli Anderson & Silver Paul	July 27, 2024	103	N/A
Tater wants to join the "10-under-10" for Biz Kid Magazine and attempts to plan out some kind of talent to show off so that she can send it to the publication. With Gordita's "help", Tater tries to look for a talent, but fails. She then plans a ridiculous stunt over the L.A. Crevasse and convinces her grandfather Pop to drive her there. Pop manages to convince her that her determination has blinded her from seeing reason and Tater gives up on her plan. So as not to disappoint the primos, Pop successfully performs the stunt himself and Tater manages to get on television, though only the back of her head is seen. Tater wants to get the next volume of Romancimorphs, but Bibi tells her that she should get rid of her older books before she does so. She agrees and gives some of her favorite childhood books to Lucita, ChaCha, and Nachito. When all three do a poor job handling them, Tater wants her books back, but Bibi forbids her. She attempts to get back at the three, but her attempts fail. Big Nacho reveals that he and Nachito are actually dyslexic and that while they love to read, it is sometimes difficult for them. Tater decides to give Nachito tips on how to make it easier for him and he grows to appreciate her book.
4	"Summer of Herramientas"	Jenn Strickland	Diego Salazar Castro	Citlalli Anderson, Natasha Kline, Silver Paul & Jenn Strickland	July 27, 2024	111	N/A
4	"Summer of La Naturaleza"	David C. Smith	Karla Sakas Shropshire	Ainsley Dye & Jackson Read	July 27, 2024	111	N/A
For Father's Day, Tater and Baby Bud decide to get their dad, also named Bud, a gift card for the hardware store. When he acts indifferent to it, Tater and Baby Bud decide to get him a better gift while Nellie goes Tio watching. Every attempt at trying to give or tell him something results in him rushing back to the hardware store even after getting some advice from Bibi who is working out with Pop. Tater and Baby Bud finally give chase and discover that the hardware store is his sanctuary. Bud tells the other patrons, who are all friends with him, that he loves his kids, but admits that he does not know how to show it. Tater and Baby Bud reveal themselves and Bud realizes that they were trying to give him the best gift ever. Upon returning home while the Tios depart, Bud decides to play catch with his kids including Nellie. Tater learns that Cousin Bud sleeps outside, due to his eco-friendly attitude. She decides to follow suit while Nellie tries and fails to sell her bed to the other primos. Tater immediately has trouble living outside like hurting her feet on the rocks and ant attacks. Cousin Bud gives her tips on how to thrive. Tater manages to make herself a shelter, but during the night, she encounters a three legged dog and befriends and feeds her. In the morning, Tater has conquered the outdoors, but is sad that the dog is gone. She suddenly returns with more of her pack and Tater thanks Cousin Bud for showing her a new way of living.
5	"Summer of Pam"	David C. Smith	Rosemary Contreras	Alayna Cabral & Celestino Marina	August 3, 2024	104	0.16
5	"Summer of La Trabajadora"	Jenn Strickland	Mikki Crisostomo	Eddie West & Cassie Zwart	August 3, 2024	104	0.16
Tater wakes up to discover that she has a pimple on her forehead. Believing that this is a sign of her becoming a woman, she proudly shows it off. Each of the primos have different reactions, with most of them insisting that she either cover it up or get rid of it. When she finally goes outside, she is shocked by the negative attention she gets from it. She hides her face, but Lita reveals that she also has pimples on her head and that she should be proud of herself, regardless. Lita, who dreams of becoming a musician one day, heads to work. Tater decides to tag along in the hopes of learning about being a business woman. She quickly learns that Lita is not a very good worker and is easily fired from her first two jobs. On the third one, she needs to interview for it. Tater dresses her up, but Lita realizes that going for a boring desk job pushes her away from her true self and decides to keep looking. Tater figures out that the local pizza place called Quakey's Pizza Place needs a new hire and Lita takes it as it also involves playing in a band.
6	"Summer of La Madriguera"	David C. Smith	Angela M. Sánchez	Ainsley Dye & Jackson Read	August 3, 2024	105	N/A
6	"Summer of Los Pollos Hermanos"	Jenn Strickland	Diego Salazar Castro	Citlalli Anderson, Amy Mai & Jenn Strickland	August 3, 2024	105	N/A
Annoyed at the fact that she cannot get any peace and quiet, Tater starts searching for a new hiding corner away from her primos. She eventually discovers that right above the garage is a very roomy crawl space and makes it her own. Her sister Nellie arrives and cheekily threatens to expose her hiding spot or move in herself, only to get stuck in the floorboards and with the garage possum loose. Overcome by her love for her sister, Tater rescues her and Nellie decides to keep her hiding spot a secret, admitting that she similarly likes to meditate to get away. Big Nacho, tired of Nachito constantly mirroring him, tricks him into leaving him alone by asking him to acquire a chicken egg. Tater rescues him from "Jean-Cluck van Fried", the meanest chicken owned by Buela, and Nachito proceeds to switch his hero worship to her. Tater soon begins to find him annoying and Big Nacho becomes self-conscious when Nellie starts belittling him. Tater and Big Nacho work together to get Nachito back and the three face off against Jean-Cluck and her coop. The fighting ceases when Nachito compliments the chickens on their eggs and he goes back to being Big Nacho's supporter.
7	"Summer of El Patín"	David C. Smith	Rosemary Contreras	Alayna Cabral, Celestino Marina & Silver Paul	August 10, 2024	106	N/A
7	"Summer of Chisme"	Jenn Strickland	Edlin Ortiz	Eddie West & Cassie Zwart	August 10, 2024	106	N/A
Tater wants to join an ice skating tryout so that she can join Romancimorphs on Ice. Lacking the ability, she decides to get help from the mysterious El Patín. She quickly discovers that it is her quiet primo Scooter who is not only a competent ice skater, but also a great tailor. Scooter helps Tater on the condition that she not tell anyone about his hobby. During the tryout, Scooter's mask falls off, but Tater and the primos support him and they succeed in getting high scores, though Tater finds that she is too young to join when the announcer directs her to the tryout's fine print. Scooter thanks Tater for helping him embrace his talents. Tater becomes jealous about the T-Sisters' gossip parties. Despite her imaginary friend Vision Tiger insisting that she finish her vision board, Tater wants in on the T-Sisters' fun. They catch her and decide to task her to find "chisme" (Spanish for "gossip") so that she can join. However, all the chisme she finds are things that the T-Sisters already know, so Tater makes up a story about Pop being a secret agent. Eventually, Tater comes to the realization that all she wants is to be included in the primos' outings after realizing that they go places without her all the time. The T-Sisters accept her explanation and allow her to hang out with them more.
8	"Summer of No Sabo"	David C. Smith	Angela M. Sánchez	Ainsley Dye & Jackson Read	August 10, 2024	107	0.12
8	"Summer of Bookita"	Jenn Strickland	Mikki Crisostomo	Citlalli Anderson, Natasha Kline, Amy Mai & Silver Paul	August 10, 2024	107	0.12
Tater is embarrassed over the fact that she cannot understand Spanish very well when she is with her primos at a churro stand run by a Spanish-speaking vendor named Hector. Upon seeing a French cafe called Café S'il Vous Plaît, she decides to learn French instead. The primos are shocked by this decision and try to force her to learn Spanish, trapping her in a room (a lá Saw) and having her go through various tasks, showing that she does know some of the language. After being pushed to her limit, the primos stop and apologize for forcing Spanish onto her. Tater says that she still wants to know Spanish, but that she needs to learn it in her own time, believing that learning French could open her interests in the future. She discovers that Café S'il Vous Plaît is owned by Hector who also knows French. Feeling the need to get out of the house, Tater announces that she is heading to the library. Lucita excitedly asks to join and discovers that Tater is a successful helper, having turned the local library (at the least kid's section) into a wonderful place. The head librarian Ms. Mahoney is happy to the see the two with Lucita revealing that, despite her age, she is very proficient in books. Tater soon becomes jealous and accidentally makes a mess. Ms. Mahoney sends her to the teen section, which Tater despises, and thinks she is being punished. She realizes that Ms. Mahoney trusts her and wants her to turn the teen section around the way she did the kid's section. Tater succeeds and apologizes to Lucita and Ms. Mahoney for her behavior, believing that Lucita will be a great helper too.
9	"Summer of the 13th Primo"	Jenn Strickland	Mikki Crisostomo	Amy Mai & Cassie Zwart	August 17, 2024	110	N/A
9	"Summer of Cuadros"	David C. Smith	Gustavo Hernandez; Additional written material by: Alayna Cabral	Alayna Cabral & Celestino Marina	August 17, 2024	110	N/A
Tater and LotLot discover a photo of a supposed 13th primo that has been crossed out. The two decide to play detective and recruit Lita to help search for clues by asking the eldest primos: Cousin Bud, Big Nacho, and Tabi. They don't find anything and Lita leaves to do other things. Tater and LotLot discover that the garden gnome outside is placed over a mound of dirt and dig it up to uncover, sheet music and marching band clothes. They bring the primos together and deduce that they belong to Lita who was trying to hide her failure of playing the French horn for band. As the primos solemnly rebury the mementos, Lita takes up the French horn again, having embraced her past mistakes. Now Tater is wanting to solve the mystery on who uploaded the video with the primos wanting to aid her in delivering payback causing Pop to become weary. For Buela's birthday, Tater comes up with the excellent idea of creating a new quilt with each of the primos contributing with their own artistic cuadro (Spanish for "picture"). Gordita reveals that she doesn't have any artistic talent because she does not understand why art is important. Meanwhile, Bibi and her brothers Ivan, Ignacio, Gustavo, and Javier realize they all forgot Buela's birthday after Tater fails to get Bibi to help as they work to find the right gift. Tater takes Gordita around town to help find her inner artist. Eventually, Gordita is subjected to a sensory overload that reminds her of her first real interaction with Buela: playing crosswords. Gordita finally finishes her square, much to Buela's delight. Upon seeing that the primos got a much better gift than their last minute one, Bibi and her brothers flee to the border planning to start a new life in Mexico.
10	"Summer of Tater Luna"	David C. Smith	Mikki Crisostomo	Alayna Cabral, Amy Mai, Celestino Marina & David C. Smith	August 17, 2024	116	N/A
10	"Summer of El Chu-PAW-Cabra"	Jenn Strickland	Rosemary Contreras	Jenn Strickland, Eddie West & Cassie Zwart	August 17, 2024	116	N/A
Tater learns that Bibi is going to teach sequential art to her summer art class students. This convinces Tater to teach her about manga and introduces her to her original character, Tater Luna. As Tater attempts to create a comic for her to read, Tater gets critiqued by the Nachos, the T-Sisters, Scooter, LotLot, and Gordita. Tater's character comes off as a mess, and she loses faith in her abilities. Bibi tells her that while it is okay to accept criticism, she shouldn't have to change it to please anyone. Tater finally makes a compelling comic for Bibi, who likes it. Once Tater has perfected her manga, she finds that the other primos have become inspired and created their own manga heroes. Tater adopts Chuchi, the tripod dog from "Summer of La Naturaleza", and asks Bud if she can keep her. Bud agrees on the condition that she train her, as she is an outside dog. Tater has difficulty doing so until she eventually runs off, forcing Tater to chase her. Buela warns Tater about the Chupacabra, whom she claims preys on little dogs and is said to be a mix of a bear, a lizard, and a wolf. With Bud's help, Tater eventually locates Chuchi and other dogs in the Crevasse with Hector, who was working as a paleta vendor. Bud used up the battery of his phone playing a tool-based game. Tater and Bud rescue them all, and Tater accepts Chuchi as an outdoor dog who can visit her anytime. In the final scene, one of the paletas is at the bottom of the cliff as the claw of the Chupacabra emerges from a cave and grabs it.
11	"Summer of the Baby Races"	David C. Smith	Edlin Ortiz	Ainsley Dye, Natasha Kline & Jackson Read	August 24, 2024	109	N/A
11	"Summer of La Extraterrestre"	Jenn Strickland	Rosemary Contreras	Citlalli Anderson, Natasha Kline & Silver Paul	August 24, 2024	109	N/A
Tater is displeased that her parents used one of her Romancimorphs shirts as an improvised diaper for Baby Bud. Upon breaking up the incident, Buela reveals that Hacienda Hills' sister town, Fresadena, holds annual baby races, with the winner getting a lifetime supply of diapers. All her children have failed, but when Tater suggests that Baby Bud enter, Bibi is against it. They take a trip to Fresadena, where an ignorant woman misidentifies Bibi as Baby Bud's "nanny," inspiring her to join. The entire Ramírez-Humphrey family supports Baby Bud, and he does well in the race, with several babies falling out. Baby Bud falls asleep just before the finish line, and Tater gives a speech about being proud of oneself. Her speech soon becomes moot as a minor earthquake carries Baby Bud across the finish line. While the primos go to the dentist, Tater is stuck at home with ChaCha while Pop does some backyard work. She watches an alien documentary and becomes convinced that ChaCha is, in fact, an alien, which she takes joy in. Soon, Tater believes that the government is after ChaCha, and they defend themselves against what they believe to be a government agent and other aliens who have been brainwashed. In the end, Tater realizes that the "alien signs" were simply ChaCha trying to take after her. The government agent was Buela returning from beekeeping classes to get honey for Pop, and the aliens were the rest of the primos with swollen mouths, as they all had cavities. ChaCha finally says "I love you Tater".
12	"Summer of El Futuro"	David C. Smith	Angela M. Sánchez	Alayna Cabral, Natasha Kline, Celestino Marina & David C. Smith	August 24, 2024	108	N/A
12	"Summer of Super No Entiendo 64"	Jenn Strickland	Diego Salazar Castro	Nate Maurer, Eddie West, Jenn Strickland & Cassie Zwart	August 24, 2024	108	N/A
After talking with Bud, Tater becomes convinced that she hasn't accomplished anything for the summer and has become stagnant. She asks the primos to help predict her future, but they either become too vague, descriptive, or inconclusive. As Tater wallows, the primos find her and remind her that she has already done so much for all of them during the summer. Bud overhears and tells her to take all the time she needs to discover herself. Tater encounters her arch-nemesis, The Skid, at Quakey's Pizza Place. When he steals Nachito's Palo de Poder, Tater and the primos team up to get it back. In the form of a video game, Tater controls the primos to invade the Skid's backyard, but each of them are defeated. Lucita asks nicely and is "kidnapped" by the Skid. Tater heads over to rescue her but discovers that the Skid fled to Quakey's to challenge Tater on a pair of kiddie rides. Just as Tater nearly runs out of quarters, the primos back her up, and she defeats the Skid and gets the Palo de Poder back.
13	"Summer of La Excavación"	Jenn Strickland	Rosemary Contreras; Additional written material by: Eddie West & Cassie Zwart	Amy Mai, Jenn Strickland, Eddie West & Cassie Zwart	August 31, 2024	112	0.08
13	"Summer of La Pijamada"	David C. Smith	Edlin Ortiz	Alayna Cabral, Celestino Marina & David C. Smith	August 31, 2024	112	0.08
Toñita reveals that she now has an interest in archeology and confides in Tater as she fears what Tere and Tabi might say. Due to a digging event happening on the same day as a fashion shopping event, Tater helps Toñita train for the former, while she spends time with sisters training with the latter. Eventually, Tere and Tabi discover Toñita's secret and are hurt that she wouldn't be open with them about it. They choose to go to the fashion event without her. At the digging event, Tater and Toñita learn from a news report that the shopping event is now a disaster area and they race over to rescue Tere and Tabi. The elders sisters accept Toñita's newfound hobby and make up as they even invite Tater in for a hug. Tater meets new kid Serena at Café S'il Vous Plaît who is into Romancimorphs, loves French culture, and is also socially awkward just like her. The two quickly become best friends, but after hearing that Serena is an only child, Tater lies by claiming she is one too. Unfortunately, she also invites her for a sleepover, which she quickly regrets. Tater immediately takes Serena to her hiding spot over the garage and the two have fun. However, Tater leaves a robot in her room which fools the primos, but when they accidentally destroy it, they think they have killed her. Eventually, Serena learns the truth, causing her to reveal she hates pizza bagels which Tater was giving her all through the night. Tater and Serena decide to remain friends. As for the pizza bagels, Bud finds them in the toilet as it erupts.
14	"Summer of Imi-Tater"	Jenn Strickland	Natasha Kline	Citlalli Anderson, Silver Paul & Jenn Strickland	August 31, 2024	113	0.08
14	"Summer of Ignacio"	David C. Smith	Karla Sakas Shropshire	Ainsley Dye, Jackson Read & David C. Smith	August 31, 2024	113	0.08
Nellie explains how she has always felt overshadowed by Tater and has compartmentalized much of her anger through meditation. When Tater decides to make a lemonade stand (which Nellie had previously suggested, but was ignored for), Nellie decides to dress up as Tater and make a better lemonade stand as Tater 2.0. The primos switch to Nellie's side. When Nellie begins to read from Tater's journal out loud, Tater feels defeated. When Nellie plans to destroy the journal, the primos start to see that she is going to far and Nellie finally snaps about all the attention Tater has been receiving. Tater explains that she needs to be more open with her and that she does think about her all the time as she has kept a list of habits that she has noticed about her. Tater and Nellie make up with one another. Big Nacho is finally set to meet his pen pal Carmela for a date. Tater and Nachito help prepare him by plotting a series of artificial events for Big Nacho to show off. When Big Nacho meets Carmela, the two hit it off very well, making Tater's plans utterly pointless as it turns out Carmela is also into weightlifting. Tater becomes upset, as she wants to make Big Nacho look better than he is, but she backs down after thinking about how he would most likely think of her for helping him get out of his shell. Carmela accepts Tater and Nachito and further shows how perfect she is for Big Nacho by revealing her ability to fart just like him.
15	"Summer of El Cringe"	David C. Smith	Mikki Crisostomo	Alayna Cabral, Amy Mai, Celestino Marina & David C. Smith	September 7, 2024	114	0.11
15	"Summer of Taternomics"	Jenn Strickland	Angela M. Sánchez	Jenn Strickland, Eddie West & Cassie Zwart	September 7, 2024	114	0.11
Tater begins to question her love of the Romancimorphs series after two teens refer to the series as "cringe". She tries to find another hobby, but cannot get the series out of her head. She decides to donate her old books to the library. Ms. Mahoney stops Tater and reveals that the author, N.K. Scheinhorn has arrived for a book signing. Ms. Mahoney tells her that she loves those books, which is all that matters. Tater then gets a photo with Scheinhorn, Serena, and the primos, and Tater learns she has a cameo on the latest book's cover. Tater wants to break into being a business CEO. At Cousin Bud's suggestion, she needs to find a need that people want and exploit that. She discovers that Scooter has been making small lucha plushies and convinces him to sell them for profit, as Scooter wants a new pair of skates. The business is successful, but Tater wants more and spends the money they earned to buy blank dolls for quicker production as The Skid takes advantage of it. Scooter confronts her about this, and Tater realizes she has been selfish and shuts the business down. This does not bode well for The Skid as his mother suggests that he not invest in small businesses. LotLot then buys all the blank dolls for her own amusement.
16	"Summer of La Hamaca"	David C. Smith	Diego Salazar Castro	Ainsley Dye, Natasha Kline & Jackson Read	September 14, 2024 (Note: This episode was first released on Disney+ on September 11, 2024.)	115	N/A
16	"Summer of the Santa Anas"	Jenn Strickland	Edlin Ortiz	Citlalli Anderson, Natasha Kline, Amy Mai & Silver Paul	September 14, 2024	115	N/A
Tater and the primos discover a hammock in the backyard. Pop attempts to warn them against sleeping in it, claiming that doing so will drain people's dreams. One by one, the primos are absorbed by the hammock, while a studious Tater and Pop remain vigilant. They are ultimately absorbed into the hammock and begin to embrace the relaxation, only for the hammock to snap and fall apart. Tater admits that it is okay to relax and suggests that she and Pop lay on the hammock by themselves, resulting in them waking up in the future. Buela deduces that a wind storm is headed for Hacienda Hills, and Tater gives her and Pop emergency backpacks as they head home to secure their items. As the family battens down, Tater prepares to write in her diary, only to realize that she gave Buela her own backpack. Without her diary, Tater begins to panic. The primos offer to be her journal, but they quickly regret this and agree to brave the storm with Tater to get her diary. Ultimately, Tater realizes that it isn't worth it. The storm finally dies down, and as Tater cleans herself up in the bathroom, she realizes her diary was there the whole time but decides not to tell the primos this.
17	"Summer of Segundos"	David C. Smith	Angela M. Sánchez	Ainsley Dye & Jackson Read	September 21, 2024	117	N/A
17	"Summer of Breaking Bud"	Jenn Strickland	Diego Salazar Castro	Citlalli Anderson, Amy Mai & Silver Paul	September 21, 2024	117	N/A
Tater wants to get out of being with the primos so that she can focus on her personal projects. She then tasks Serena with being her "Segundo" (Second) to stand in for her. Inspired by the idea, the rest of the primos all proceed to hire segundos of their own, creating a very mish-mashed family. Big Nacho was hesitant at first until Carmela arrived and he brings in Jean-Cluck Van-Fried as his segundo. Tater begins to realize that she misses the primos and they too begin to miss each other, though Big Nacho has to be forced back as he was with Carmela. Tater reveals that she created a coat of arms to represent their family and they celebrate. Meanwhile, the segundos are at Buela's having lunch. When she states that they are having chicken, Jean-Cluck Van Fried begins to retaliate. At Quakey's Pizza Place, Tater continues to waste her money on trying to acquire sticky paws like one associated with a giant kangaroo rat. Cousin Bud reveals that before his eco-friendly mission, he was a commerce king named Cousin Buck and offers to help her acquire the sticky paws she wants, but warns her about his alternate personality. As Cousin Buck, he succeeds in collecting all the sticky paws for Tater, whom also picks up on his business habits. The other primos join in, but Nachito falls behind in sales causing Cousin Buck to belittle him. When he refuses him comfort, Tater and the rest of the primos fight back with Tater returning Cousin Bud to normal by undoing his manbun. Cousin Bud apologizes for his behavior, but is threatened back when Buela falls for an online scam followed by a cliffhanger narration asking if Cousin Bud will revert to Cousin Buck to save Buela from the online scam.
18	"Summer of Gwenship"	Jenn Strickland	Mikki Crisostomo	Natasha Kline, Amy Mai, Jenn Strickland, Eddie West & Cassie Zwart	September 28, 2024	118	N/A
18	"Summer of Heart Eyes"	David C. Smith	Edlin Ortiz	Alayna Cabral, Celestino Marina & David C. Smith	September 28, 2024	118	N/A
Tater gets a visit from Gwennifer Malfeo, an incredibly mean and torturous young girl who is The Skid's older sister. She is at first confused by her arrival, but discovers that she came to get close to Cousin Bud whom she has a hidden crush on. Tater decides to "help" Gwennifer by sabotaging any chance of her piquing his interest, but when she shows genuine gratitude for helping her, Tater confesses that she was going to ruin everything and decides to help her for real. She simply tells her to introduce herself. After a brief interaction, Gwennifer claims to have gotten over her crush on Cousin Bud and Tater realizes that she is no longer afraid of her. However, Gwennifer still has a crush on Cousin Bud. Lita misses her quality time with Tater, forcing Tater, Scooter, and Lucita to look for her. They find that Lita has been spending a lot of time with her coworker Alex and come to the realization that she is in love with them. Scooter and Lucita reveal that Lita has had a terrible history of heart breaks and Tater begins to tail Alex. When she sees them getting flowers for "Mercedes", Tater is convinced that Alex is two timing Lita. They end up at the movie theaters together where Tater tells Lita what she saw, and Alex reveals that Mercedes is their mother. Tater apologizes for sticking her nose in their business while Lita admits that she should've been more open about her feelings. Alex implies that they do like Lita and wants to pursue a relationship, and Tater accepts them after learning they are into Romancimorphs.
19	"Summer of Hacienda Chills"	Jenn Strickland	Mikki Crisostomo	Citlalli Anderson & Silver Paul	October 5, 2024	123	0.09
19	"Summer of Los Bots"	David C. Smith	Edlin Ortiz	Ainsley Dye & Jackson Read	October 5, 2024	123	0.09
In this clip show, LotLot believes that the tree in the backyard is the reason for all the strange happenings during the summer; Tater and the rest of the primos dismiss it until they begin to reminisce on everything they have been through so far. As LotLot explains that the state of the tree is due to someone needing to apologize for something, the tree begins to excrete a strange sap along with objects that each of the primos have gifted Tater previously. She admits that she wasn't too fond of them, but didn't want to hurt their feelings as she was starting to bond with them. As she apologizes, it suddenly starts to rain and washes the sap away. The primos forgive Tater, though LotLot frets that it's not over yet. The primos do not appreciate the way Gordita treats them as experiments rather than people. Tater and Cousin Bud decide to aid her through the use of her robot Gor3ta. As Tater poses as the robot in an effort to help Gordita open up, Gordita comes to the conclusion that she has been very distant towards her cousins and should try to see them as people. Unfortunately, Gordita figures Tater and Cousin Bud's ruse and tries to get back at everyone through robotic frogs. However, the primos love the frogs, causing Gordita to calm down. She thanks Tater and Cousin Bud for making her realize that she should be more considerate and forgives them for their scheme.
20	"Summer of the Mixtape"	David C. Smith	Rosemary Contreras	Ainsley Dye & Jackson Read	March 2, 2025	119	N/A
20	"Summer of Je Ne Sais Quoi"	Jenn Strickland	Angela M. Sánchez	Citlalli Anderson, Amy Mai & Silver Paul	March 2, 2025	119	N/A
In this second clip show, Tater decides to document her summer using a mixtape labeled "Now That's What I Call Tater!", sharing her favorite songs so far in the series. She plans to give the mixtape to the Martians in space. This is until the mixtape gets messed up and Lita offers to fix it. Meanwhile, the primos also have a go of reminiscing old songs they sang from the series with Nellie trying to get in on the mix. Tater later learns that she could never have made her mixtape successful if it weren't for her primos. The mixtape is abducted by a UFO and the Martians already love it. When Tater discovers that Serena is being treated like a mature adult due to her ears piercing, she wants her to teach her how to be an adult whisperer. Serena also wants to be taught how to be a "child yeller". However, they later discover that adult whispering and child yelling is hard, but refuse to give up. Serena is finally bonding with the primos and Bibi lets Tater get her ears pierced. Though, Tater isn't ready to get her ears pierced and Bibi lets her decide when she wants it to happen. Later, Tater and Serena agree never to be teenagers.
21	"Summer of Local Girl"	David C. Smith	Mikki Crisostomo	Ainsley Dye, Jackson Read & David C. Smith	March 9, 2025 (Note: This episode was first released on Disney+ on March 5, 2025.)	121	N/A
21	"Summer of Cumple"	Jenn Strickland	Rosemary Contreras; Additional written material by: Natasha Kline & Rachel McNevin	Citlalli Anderson, Kiana Khansmith, Natasha Kline, Silver Paul & Jenn Strickland	March 9, 2025	121	N/A
When the news doesn't recognize Tater despite her appearing on the station in "Summer of Los Diez", she decides to create a documentary named "The Tater Zone" using tapes owned by her family that she hopes won't be missed by them. In the documentary, Tater gets her primos to reenact special moments in her life in Hacienda Hills, like discovering her first Romancimorphs book or losing her first tooth. However, she later learns from Buela following a talk with Bibi that due to an emergency, she was born in Fresadena instead. Due to this, she moves to Fresadena and doesn't fit in with its residents. Having followed Tater, Buela arrives and tells Tater that despite not being born in Hacienda Hills, she should still be proud that she lives there with her family. They return to Hacienda Hills and Tater finishes her documentary. Tater finally turns 10, but her siblings get the chickenpox and her parents won't be able to return in time to celebrate her birthday. Due to this, the primos decide to prepare her birthday instead. However, things go awry when Tater asks for multiple requests from the primos, resulting in her entire party getting ruined. Despite this, Tater still had fun can't wait for her next birthday, knowing her primos will always be there to make it spectacular. Tater's parents return and discover that Baby Bud and Nellie never had chickenpox the whole time and it was something else that was responsible. When everyone is here, they all properly celebrate Tater's birthday.
22	"Summer of La Cultura"	Jenn Strickland	Angela M. Sánchez	Jenn Strickland, Eddie West & Cassie Zwart	March 16, 2025	120	N/A
22	"Summer of Santa Tabi"	Jenn Strickland	Edlin Ortiz	Eddie West & Cassie Zwart	March 16, 2025	120	N/A
Hacienda Hills celebrates their first ever "Día de la Cultura" and Tater tries to fit in at the festival. Most of the Ramírez-Humphrey family is there except for Bibi who is having some alone time. However, Tater has a hard time and messes up in every competition. She later learns from Lita that she and her siblings are half Mexican-American and half Dominican-American and not even she's great at some things at the festival, but doesn't have to represent everything. LotLot also admits that she's half-Filipino. At the end, Tater decides to just stick to making papel picados. She is later acclaimed for her unintentional tortilla illustration of Pedro Infante, which comes after a previous accident during the tortilla competition. Despite this, Tater doesn't know who Infante is which shocks Buela. When Tabi sprains her ankle, Tere and Toñita try to find a way to thank her for all she's done for them. Having to deliver breakfast to Tabi when Bibi refuses to take full responsibility for the accident that injured Tabi, Tater offers to help Tere and Toñita and gives them ideas. However, Tater's ideas don't work. Due to this, Tere and Toñita decide to talk to Tabi themselves. They tell Tabi that just because she's the oldest, she doesn't have to take excessive care of them. The T-Sisters' dad Ivan calls them and they tell him that everything's going fine.
23	"Summer of Calabazas y Tostones"	Jenn Strickland	Diego Salazar Castro & Mikki Crisostomo; Additional written material by: Eddie West	Amy Mai, Jenn Strickland, Eddie West & Cassie Zwart	March 23, 2025	122	N/A
23	"Summer of El Demo" "Summer of El Demo Tape"	David C. Smith	Angela M. Sánchez	Alayna Cabral, Danny Ducker & Amy Mai	March 23, 2025	122	N/A
Now that she's 10, Tater is finally able to play the board game Calabazas y Tostones with the older primos Lita, Cousin Bud, Big Nacho, and LotLot. However, Tater keeps rolling ones, resulting in her failing constantly. Due to this, she decides to play by her own rules (playing by herself). Tater later gets lonely playing by herself and apologizes to the older primos for her actions. She later helps them win the entire game. Bibi returns to the kitchen to make some dinner only to find the entire kitchen a mess after the game. When Tater discovers that Lita and her mother Rita have an unresolved feud, she wants to put things right. She dresses up as Rita in order to "practice" what she is like. However, everything Tater does with Lita is nothing like what Rita would ever do. Lita finishes her final demo track and Tater thinks that sending it to Rita might fix everything. Rita receives the track and discovers the Lita is just like her, as she secretly also likes rock music.
24	"Summer of Los Limones"	David C. Smith	Diego Salazar Castro	Alayna Cabral, Danny Ducker & Amy Mai	March 30, 2025	124	N/A
24	"Summer of La Iguana"	Jenn Strickland	Karla Sakas Shropshire	Citlalli Anderson, Silver Paul, Natasha Kline & Jenn Strickland	March 30, 2025	124	N/A
Big Nacho sends Nachito out on a "Dino-Quest" to retrieve two limones from Buela's yard before he returns from his date with Carmela. He also sends Tater out on a "Capy-Quest" to watch over Nachito without meddling. Nachito recruites Buff Egg, Jean-Cluck Van Fried's unhatched child, to help him look for the limones. Tater tries hard not to meddle but can't resist when many dangerous things happen. She finally decides to meddle when the limones get runied and helps Nachito and Buff Egg get new ones. However, Big Nacho says that he wanted key lime to make a pie and not lemons which both happen to be called "limones" in Spanish. The four decide to make lemonada instead. Tater is celebrating "Mañana de La Iguana" where a legendary iguana named "La Iguana Dorada" comes at night and gives treats to everyone. Additionally, she buries a golden egg somewhere in Buela's yard and whoever finds it receives good luck for the entire summer. However at night, Tater searches for La Iguana only to find that it was all just Lita, Cousin Bud, Big Nacho, and Tabi faking the holiday the whole time with LotLot dressed as an iguana as this holiday was revealed to have been invented by Pop and Buela. Despite this, she later learns that holiday is all just for fun activities with the primos and Tater is asked to join them. The next morning, the primos search for the egg and Tater and LotLot discover that La Iguana Dorada was actually real the whole time.
25	"Summer of Primo-lympics"	Jenn Strickland	Laura E. Rivas	Amy Mai, Eddie West, Jenn Strickland & Cassie Zwart	April 6, 2025	125	N/A
25	"Summer of Las Tóxicas"	David C. Smith	Edlin Ortiz; Additional written material by: Danny Ducker	Alayna Cabral & Danny Ducker	April 6, 2025	125	N/A
Every summer, the primos compete in the "Primo-lympics", a family tradition where the primos compare athleticism, sportsmanship, and teamwork to win the gold. Buela runs the "Primo-lympics" with Pop's help as Bibi, Bud, and the Tios watch. However, due to their constant squabbling, Tater and Nellie remain the only primos who haven't won the gold yet. This year, the two decide to put their odds aside and work together to win. However, Baby Bud is forced to win every challenge for Tater and Nellie when they're too busy being kind to each other. Despite Baby Bud's interference much to the dismay of Bibi, the competition is fierce. Cousin Bud and Gordita are eliminated for having a robot help them find a lemon in a pool of rubber duckies. LotLot and ChaCha are eliminated after LotLot used her occult abilities by summoning her ghostly great aunt during the human toss where she accidentally tossed ChaCha far. Big Nacho and Nachito are eliminated for picking a bad egg during the egg-collecting game. Soon, only Tater and Nellie, the T-Sisters, and Lita, Scooter, and Lucita are left. With Baby Bud's help two later realize that they don't have to be too polite or too rude to each other, and they end up winning the Primo-lympics, despite only ranking 3rd place. Serena wants to join Gwennifer and her friends, Pacheco and Peña in their "Pigeon Scout" where they practice with archery. She also wants to befriend Pacheco and Peña with her. Tater tricks Gwennifer into quitting her job as leader for the scout and chooses Serena to be the new leader. However, Tater starts to miss Serena as she's bonding more with Pacheco and Peña, while Gwennifer misses being the boss of the Pigeon Scout. Due to this, Tater and Gwennifer are forced to team up with each other to get their favorite hobbies back. Even if it costs Tater to become a tóxica. She refuses and learns that Serena, Pacheco and Peña didn't think of each other as friends and instead boss/"minions". Serena quits being the leader to be with Tater, giving the job back to Gwennifer.
26	"Summer of El Fanfic"	Jenn Strickland	Angela M. Sánchez	Citlalli Anderson & Silver Paul	April 13, 2025	126	N/A
26	"Summer of Las Muralistas"	David C. Smith	Laura E. Rivas	Ainsley Dye & Jackson Read	April 13, 2025	126	N/A
Serena writes a fanfic all by herself for the first time and Tater also wants to do the same. However, she has trouble and enlists help from the primos but they don't understand Romancimorphs like she does. Tater arrives at Café S'il Vous Plaît and tells Serena that she couldn't come up with anything. Serena confesses that it wasn't easy making her first independent fanfic but she always knew how to make it better. Tater feels confident to continue her fanfic. Quakey's Pizza Place announces a mural contest with the prize being one year of free pizza. Bibi wants to make the mural with Tater as part of their "Bibi-Tater Time", but the latter wants to make it by herself. Bibi feels heartbroken and can't focus on her own mural, while Tater successfully finishes her. Tater tells Bibi that even though she feels confident in doing some stuff by herself, she still needs the latter's help for some things, like fixing her mural. In the competition, the primos lose to the Skid, who cheats in the contest with the help of his mother. Tater and Bibi decide to work on their next art project together.
27	"Summer of Booyah Buh Bisabuela"	Jenn Strickland	Edlin Ortiz	Jenn Strickland, Eddie West & Cassie Zwart	April 20, 2025	127	N/A
27	"Summer of Silencio"	Jenn Strickland	Natasha Kline; Additional written material by: Silver Paul	Citlalli Anderson & Silver Paul	April 20, 2025	127	N/A
Initially coming to ask Buela for ice cream, Tater helps her search for the receipt for her molcajete and instead finds a picture in which she believes is her from 1925. Buela tells her that it's a picture of her mother Patricia who looks the same and has the same name as Tater. Tater learns that Patricia also kept a diary just like her and she thinks that it's the "cheat code" into finding her final form. She is told to ask the primos to translate the Spanish words for her, but she decides to translate it herself uses a Spanish dictionary. However, she only manages to translate a single sentence in a few hours and gives up, exhaustedly drifting asleep. She wakes up in a dream and is met face-to-face with a young Patricia who shares her dreams of being a weaver with Tater. Before Tater wakes up, Patricia tells that whatever path she chooses for her final form, it's best not to do it alone. When she wakes up, Tater finally decides to share Patricia's diary with the primos. Two women talk to Tater in Spanish and criticize her for not understanding what they meant. Tater takes this literally and questions her knowledge of Spanish. With Bud not also good at Spanish, he comments to Tater that this is usually her mother's strong point as it cuts to a weeping Bibi at her dentist appointment where Buela holds her hand. She realizes that every time she tries to get better at the language, she's always judged and brought down. Because of this, she vows to remain silent for the rest of her life. The next morning, the primos notice Tater's silence and try to get her talk in many ways. She later gets irritated and reveals to them that she's tired of being a "no sabo" kid and being the only one who can't speak proper Spanish. The primos confess to her that they don't everything in Spanish but don't have to be perfect at a language to speak it. Lita gives Tater her Spanish dictionary so she can learn more about the language. Later on, she comes across Bud and offers him to read the dictionary together.
28	"Summer of Sueños"	David C. Smith & Jenn Strickland	Diego Salazar Castro & Angela M. Sánchez	Alayna Cabral, Danny Ducker, Amy Mai, David C. Smith, Jenn Strickland, Eddie West & Cassie Zwart	April 27, 2025	128	N/A
Independence Day is coming up, and Tater has not had any leads to her final form, much to the dismay of Vision Tiger. She plans to end it on a good note so that she can start her next volume. With enough money saved, Buela can finally apply to become a U.S. citizen, and has only been in the United States of America because of her marriage to Pop. Seeing this as an opportunity for the final entry in her volume one diary, Tater enlists the primos to help Pop prepare Buela for her exam, while dispatching Nellie to take the parents and the tios in search of fireworks. Despite setbacks on both ends, the family heads to the local United States Department of State office for Buela's exam. Its worker Bill breaks the bad news to them by saying that Pop and Buela are not legally married because Pop didn't sign the marriage certificate, and that the wedding was officiated by Jean-Cluck Van Fried. Tater then leads everyone into getting Pop and Buela married and making Buela an official U.S. citizen before Bill goes on vacation. Despite some difficulties and Pop and Buela getting cold feet, Tater manages to fix everything. Bill officiates the wedding and Buela's citizenship exam, while Gordita uses frog-themed fireworks that she made environmentally safe for Cousin Bud. While noting that her life wouldn't be this exciting without her primos, Tater plans to start her new diary as she has plenty of summer left.

== Shorts ==
=== A Piece of My Mind (2024) ===
No.	Title	Original release date
1	"A Piece of My Mind: Primos"	June 27, 2024
Tater meets her creator Natasha Kline and learns how Primos was inspired by Kline's experiences growing up in Los Angeles.

=== Chibi Tiny Tales (2024) ===
Shortly after the series premiere, Primos joined the Chibi Tiny Tales series.

No.	Title	Original release date
1	"Get Baby Bud's Binky Back"	July 27, 2024
Tater and the primos attempt to retrieve Baby Bud's pacifier after it gets stolen by a bluebird.
2	"The Summer of Silenciosa"	August 10, 2024
Tater attempts to find a quiet place to read her new book.
3	"Odd Primo Out"	August 24, 2024
Tater begins to feel depressed when she's left out of everything that the primos do.

=== How NOT to Draw (2024) ===
No.	Title	Original release date
1	"How NOT to Draw: Tater"	September 14, 2024

=== Theme Song Takeover (2024) ===
As part of a promotional campaign, Disney Channel began airing the Disney Theme Song Takeover, wherein supporting characters from different shows performed the theme song to the series they were in.

No.	Title	Original release date
1	"T-Sisters Theme Song Takeover"	September 21, 2024
2	"LotLot Theme Song Takeover"	October 5, 2024

=== Road Trip (2025) ===
A series of road trip-themed shorts. These shorts are a loose follow-up to a similar series of shorts from Big City Greens.

No.	Title	Original release date
1	"Twifties Assemble!"	April 4, 2025
Lita surprises Tater with concert tickets to see Sailor Twift, their favorite singer, live. But the primos surprise Tater by coming to the concert, too.
2	"Vamos Al Concierto!"	April 4, 2025
Tater and her primos try to find a Sailor Twift song to sing to while stuck in traffic.
3	"Primos Bizzaros"	April 11, 2025
The primos find themselves in a car race with bizarro versions of themselves.
4	"The Great Egg Handoff"	April 18, 2025
When ChaCha gets hangry after running out of hard boiled eggs, Tater calls Bibi for an emergency backup.
5	"Primos Twiftie-Palooza"	April 25, 2025
The primos finally made it to the concert, but the tickets they have are fakes.

== Development ==
On November 3, 2021, it was reported that Natasha Kline, a long-time storyboarder and character designer, was developing an animated series titled Primos for Disney Television Animation (DTVA). The series was inspired by Kline's childhood summers living with her cousins alongside her extended Mexican-American family and she wanted the lead characters to also be of Mexican-American heritage due to the lack of representation on television during her childhood. Meredith Roberts, a senior vice president at DTVA said the series bears the "authentic voice" of Kline and "her family's culture and values", and that the series would be aimed at kids and families. Edward Mejia, a DTVA executive, oversaw the series. Prior to being greenlit, Primos was in an intense bidding war between Disney and Netflix, with Disney ultimately winning out.

On June 15, 2022, at the 2022 Annecy International Animation Film Festival, it was announced that the show's first season would have an order of 30 episodes. Philip Cohen was announced as series producer. In March 2023, Kline told Animation Magazine that the series was inspired by an adult short she had created for an Upright Citizen's Brigade stand-up comedy show in 2017, was inspired by Peanuts and Calvin and Hobbes, and said she loved working with the show's crew, praising their "intense passion, drive, and talent".

On July 8, 2024, the series' official trailer was released.

== Controversy ==
On June 13, 2023, the series' opening sequence was released by Disney Branded Television. It received criticism on social media, largely from Mexicans and other Latin American communities. Some criticized the show's premise by drawing similarities to that of Nickelodeon's The Loud House and, more specifically, its spin-off series The Casagrandes. Other viewers criticized the opening sequence for presenting various negative stereotypes associated with Latin American culture, arguing that the names of the setting and some characters could be considered offensive, and that the Spanish grammar used was incorrect. Many also criticized the use of a "Mexican filter", a visual technique often used in American media to invoke a "foreign" atmosphere in Hispanic settings.

There was further online backlash when online comments by Tater's voice actor, Myrna Velasco, called viewers criticizing the show's Spanish as "grammar nazis", describing the Spanish language as being "forced upon Latin American people" by Spanish conquistadors. In a comment she later deleted, she wrote that people could be angry at her for misspelling or mispronouncing Spanish words, but she was a Native American and Mexican-American woman, and argued they were trying to make a "good show for kids" and said that if people are angry at the latter, then "be mad then."

In an interview on June 16, 2023, Kline said the series is based on her personal experiences of growing up with a multicultural Mexican-American family in Los Angeles in the 1990s, being bicultural, biracial, and said that the project's relatability attracted well-known individuals like Melissa Villaseñor. She also stated that Tater does not speak Spanish, which is why her grammar is incorrect; emphasised the importance of cousins in her life; and stated that the art style showcased the environment in L.A. She additionally hoped the series would make people proud of their roots.

Later in production, the name of the fictional town was changed from Terremoto Heights to Hacienda Hills, as the original name drew criticism for alluding to the earthquakes common in the region. The name of one of the characters was changed from Cookita to Lucita, as the former was viewed as being similar to a vulgar term in several dialects of Latin American Spanish, though in actuality it was a variation of Cuquita, an affectionate nickname usually for those named Refugia. As a result of online criticism, the series premiere was delayed several times, with reports alluding that edits were being made to already-completed episodes. Changes were made to emphasize that the show is set in Los Angeles and not in Latin America.

== Release ==
Primos premiered on Disney Channel on July 25, 2024, and the first nine episodes were released on Disney+ a day later. The series was originally scheduled to premiere on January 19, 2024, before being postponed to June 6, and later to its eventual premiere date. By October 28, 2024, the first nineteen episodes were available to stream on Disney+. The series ended on April 27, 2025, after one season.

Primos became the first series in Disney Television Animation history not to premiere in Latin America, including Brazil. The series is available to stream in Latin America in English, it did not receive a Latin American Spanish or Brazilian Portuguese dub. A European Spanish dubbed version premiered on Disney Channel in Spain in 2024.

== Critical reception ==
Prior to the show's release, Tara Bennett of Cartoon Brew described the series as a "perfect summer show for kids and families" and argued that it captures the fun of attempting to "co-exist inside a large extended family" for an entire summer.

Tony Betti of Laughing Place gave Primos a grade of 4 out of 5 and complimented the show's humor and heartfelt storytelling, particularly the character Nellie, who brought a Big City Greens-style comedic charm. He stated that the series successfully balances authenticity and diversity, capturing the creator's personal experiences growing up in a Mexican-American family.

Fernanda Camargo of Common Sense Media rated Primos 3 out of 5 stars and praised its focus on family dynamics and the protagonist's struggles to find herself within a crowded household. Camargo noted that while the show includes bickering, teasing, and bathroom humor, it remains lighthearted and suitable for tweens. Camargo appreciated the show's themes of family, joy, learning from mistakes, and the positive message about sharing and understanding, but noted the presence of stereotypes.

=== Accolades ===
Year	Award	Category	Nominee(s)	Result	Ref.
2024	Velma Awards	Best Requited Queer Crush	"Summer of Heart Eyes"	Won	
2025	Annie Awards	Best Animated Production	"Summer of Tater Luna"	Nominated	
2025	GLAAD Media Awards	Outstanding Kids & Family Programming or Film - Animated	"Summer of Heart Eyes"	Nominated	
