= Star vs. the Forces of Evil =

American animated television series

- Genre: Action; Adventure; Comedy; Magical girl
- Created by: Daron Nefcy
- Developed by: Jordana Arkin; Dave Wasson
- Creative director: Dominic Bisignano (seasons 1–2)
- Voices of: Eden Sher; Adam McArthur
- Theme music composer: Brad Breeck
- Opening theme: "I'm from Another Dimension", performed by Brad Breeck
- Ending theme: "Star vs. the Forces of Evil End Theme", performed by Eden Sher (seasons 1–2); "Shining Star", performed by Agnes Shin (seasons 3–4)
- Composer: Brian H. Kim
- Country of origin: United States
- Original language: English
- No. of seasons: 4
- No. of episodes: 77 (list of episodes)

Production
- Executive producer: Daron Nefcy
- Editors: Ted Supa; Yoonah Yim
- Running time: 22 minutes
- Production company: Disney Television Animation

Original release
- Network: Disney XD
- Release: January 18, 2015 (Note: The first episode premiered as a preview on Disney Channel. The series began its regular run on Disney XD on March 30, 2015.) – April 7, 2018
- Network: Disney Channel
- Release: March 10 – May 19, 2019

Star vs. the Forces of Evil is an American animated magical girl television series created by Daron Nefcy and developed by Jordana Arkin and Dave Wasson for Disney Channel and Disney XD. It is the first Disney XD series and the third Disney Television Animation series (following Pepper Ann from 1997 and Doc McStuffins from 2012) to be created by a woman.

The series follows the adventures of Star Butterfly (voiced by Eden Sher), the young and turbulent heir to the royal throne in the dimension of Mewni, who is sent to Earth to mellow her reckless behavior. There, she befriends and becomes roommates with human Marco Diaz (Adam McArthur) and begins a semi-normal life in the town of Echo Creek, attending school and meeting new friends. Throughout the first season, the two travel to exotic dimensions using dimensional scissors while preventing the Mewman monster Ludo (Alan Tudyk), and later, Toffee (Michael C. Hall), from stealing Star's magic wand. As the series progresses, Star and Marco fall in love with each other, meet new friends, face new enemies, and travel to more strange dimensions.

Star vs. the Forces of Evil typically follows a format of two 11-minute-long independent "segments" per episode for the first three seasons. The fourth season has a few more half-hour episodes than the first three. Greenlit for Disney Channel in 2013, the first episode of the series aired as a preview on January 18, 2015. The series then moved to Disney XD on March 30, 2015, where its premiere on Disney XD became the most-watched animated series debut in the network's history. The fourth and final season premiered on March 10, 2019, with the series returning to Disney Channel. The series ended on May 19, 2019, with the episode "Cleaved".

== Plot ==
Star Butterfly is a magical princess from the dimension of Mewni and the heiress to the royal throne of the Butterfly Kingdom. By tradition, she is given her family's heirloom wand on her 14th birthday and was known to be the most energetic and silly child through the royal family. After she accidentally sets fire to the family castle, her parents, King River and Queen Moon Butterfly, decide that a safer option is to send her to Earth as a foreign exchange student so that she can continue her magic training there. On Earth, Star befriends student Marco Diaz and lives with his family in suburban Los Angeles while attending Echo Creek Academy. Going on a series of misadventures using "dimensional scissors" with the ability to open portals, Star and Marco must deal with everyday school life while protecting Star's wand from falling into the hands of Ludo, a half-bird, half-man creature from Mewni who commands a group of monsters.

As the series progresses, new, more threatening antagonists appear in the show, including the mysterious monster Toffee and former Queen Eclipsa's half-Mewman, half-monster daughter Meteora Butterfly. The plot shifts from the defense of the wand from Ludo to a bigger and more complex narrative focusing on the various conflicts revolving around prejudice against monsters, the rulership of Mewni, Mewni's origins, and the very nature of magic itself. Several mysteries about the past of the Butterfly royal family are also unveiled, mostly revolving around Eclipsa Butterfly, the "Queen of Darkness" and the most infamous member in the Butterfly family history. Several secondary protagonists also appear more prominently or join the series in subsequent seasons, including Star's Mewman best friend Pony Head (who is a floating unicorn head), Star's half-demon ex-boyfriend Tom, the mischievous Janna, and Magic High Commission member Hekapoo; Queen Moon also takes on a bigger role.

== Background and production ==
=== Development ===
Nefcy said she originally created Star as a girl who wanted to be a magical girl like Sailor Moon, and Marco as a boy who was obsessed with Dragon Ball Z and karate; they would be enemies instead of friends. In this earlier version, Star did not have any actual magical powers; she instead would approach and solve problems primarily through the force of her determination alone. Nefcy began pitching the show to Cartoon Network during the time when she was in her third year of college, when the network was actively soliciting the creation of pilots for The Cartoonstitute. However, the network did not green light her vision for the show and was not made. Nefcy originally placed Star in the fourth grade, reflecting on a time in her own childhood when she held a self-described obsession with the animated series Sailor Moon. However, Nefcy later adjusted the character's age to fourteen during the time she made her series proposition to Disney rather than Cartoon Network originally. An executive at that time made the suggestion for Star to have actual magical powers. Nefcy worked this concept into the show's current iteration, along with different dimensions as locations, the foreign exchange student framing device, and the consequences of Star's royal birthright. Nefcy said that the overall concept has evolved over about six years.

In addition to Sailor Moon and Dragon Ball Z, Nefcy has said that she had heavy influence in her youth from the Japanese anime series Magic Knight Rayearth, Revolutionary Girl Utena and Unico, the last of which featured a blue unicorn. She also cited shows unrelated to Japanese animation such as Buffy the Vampire Slayer, and was influenced by independent comic series such as Scott Pilgrim and The Dungeon. With regards to the development of more strong female characters, Nefcy said that she "looked at TV over the years and I have had to go to Japan when I was younger to find the cartoons that had the characters that I wanted to see. It was always a question of 'Well, why isn't that on TV in the U.S.?'"

One of the concepts she likes about the show is that it does not make high school the most important experience for teenagers. She also likes that Star does her own thing instead of being concerned about fitting in. Nefcy did not want the gimmick about keeping the magic powers a secret from others as typical of magical girl shows, so she had the students already know about it and Marco's parents as well. She also portrays Star as not really a superhero as she does not specifically go after super-villains except when they attack her, and that she does not really save people. Nefcy said that the episodes balance comedy and drama: "we really want our characters to feel like teenagers and have them going through the normal emotions that teenagers go through, but in this magical setting."

Storyboarding and design were done in Los Angeles. In describing the process, Nefcy said that the show is storyboard-driven, with each episode mapped out by the storyboard artists. The storyboarders also do the writing, taking a two-page outline and turning it into a full script. A storyboard for 11 minutes would require about 2,000 drawings to be done in a six-week period. After pre-production in the US, the first season animation was done at Mercury Filmworks in Ottawa, Canada. Mercury had also done Wander Over Yonder and the Mickey Mouse series. For the rest of the first season, the animation was done at Toon City in Manila, Philippines. The rest of the series (seasons 2–4) was animated by Sugarcube and Rough Draft Studios, both located in South Korea.

The theme song was done by Brad Breeck, who also did Gravity Falls' opening theme. Nefcy said, "when we were listening to it we didn't know, because we just listened blind". Brian Kim was chosen among a group of about ten people as the show's composer. Kim describes the music for each dimension as having a different sound and relating it to indie rock in Los Angeles.

The show was initially scheduled to premiere on Disney Channel after being greenlit in March 2013, for a premiere in the fall of 2014, before being switched over to Disney XD. However, on February 23, 2018, it was announced that the show would be moving to Disney Channel for its fourth season. On February 7, 2019, it was announced that the fourth season would be its last.

== Promotion and release ==
The show's title sequence was promoted at Comic-Con 2014 six months prior to its scheduled broadcast premiere. As a result, the footage was uploaded by fans to YouTube who then started generating fan art and fan fiction. The first episode premiered on Disney Channel in January 2015. The positive reaction on social media prompted Disney XD to order a second season of the series in February 2015, six weeks ahead of its launch of the series on Disney XD in March. Disney sitcom actors Olivia Holt and Kelli Berglund participated in promoting the series the weeks before its Disney XD premiere, with Holt dressing up as Star.

The second season premiered on July 11, 2016. The show's third season was ordered ahead on March 4, 2016. It premiered on July 15, 2017, with a two-hour long television movie entitled "The Battle for Mewni" and consisted of the first four episodes. A live chat featuring Star and Marco was aired on Disney XD on July 17. The remaining third-season episodes started airing on November 6, 2017. A fourth season was also ordered ahead of the third season premiere. That fourth season, announced to be its last in February 2019, premiered on March 10, 2019, with twenty-one episodes.

=== International ===
Star vs. the Forces of Evil premiered in Canada on the DHX-owned Disney XD on April 6, 2015, and was later moved to the Corus-owned Disney XD on December 1. The series premiered on Disney XD channels in the United Kingdom and Ireland on April 16, 2015, in Australia on August 3, and in the Middle East and Africa on October 5. It also premiered on November 8 on Disney Channel in Southeast Asia. On June 15, the series premiered in South Korea. The series premiered on December 18, 2015, in Japan. The series premiered on March 6, 2016, as Star Butterfly in French on La Chaîne Disney in Canada. The show premiered on November 2 on Disney XD in Italy, and on Disney Channel on November 2, 2016.

== Episodes ==
Season	Segments	Episodes	Originally released		
Season	Segments	Episodes	First released	Last released	Network
1	24	13	January 18, 2015 (Note: The first episode premiered as a preview on Disney Channel. The season began its regular run on Disney XD on March 30, 2015.)	September 21, 2015	Disney XD
2	41	22	July 11, 2016	February 27, 2017	Disney XD
3	38	21	July 15, 2017	April 7, 2018	Disney XD
4	37	21	March 10, 2019	May 19, 2019	Disney Channel

== Reception ==
=== Critical reception ===
Star vs. the Forces of Evil has received positive reviews from critics.

Kevin Johnson of The A.V. Club gave the pilot episode a B+, saying that the show was something children could have a lot of fun with, noting how the show follows current trends in American animation "towards large-eyed characters and quirky visual trends". Johnson stated that Star vs. the Forces of Evil "excels on wild, silly, and clever set-pieces to bring the laughs and action", but expected that adult viewers won't get much out of it.

In reviewing episodes from the first season, Marcy Cook of The Mary Sue described the show as a blend of others such as Invader Zim and a sanitized Ren & Stimpy, with great appeal to tween and teen girls as well some laugh out loud moments for adults. She said, "[I]t's really cool to see a girl who is into cuteness and rainbows also kick-ass and enjoy it". Cook was bothered by the short episodes that made the plot seem rushed or underdeveloped, and criticised Marco's retconned personality from the pilot episode where he was a safety conscious kid to the series where he was a martial arts fight seeker. Caitlin Donovan of entertainment website Epicstream listed it among her top 10 animated series of 2015. She found the first few episodes to be "a little rough for me, like the show was trying too hard to be funny and weird", but that the show got better with character development and relationship building, with "a really dramatic, high-tension finale to the first season".

The first seasons holds a 100% approval rating on Rotten Tomatoes based on 5 critic reviews, with an average rating of 7.00/10.

=== Ratings ===
The premiere of Star vs. the Forces of Evil became the most-watched animated series debut in Disney XD’s history with an average of 1.2 million viewers. Following the end of the second season, Disney XD announced that in 2016, Star and another animated show Milo Murphy's Law had reached over 100 million consumer views combined across its media platforms.

=== Awards and nominations ===
The episode "Party with a Pony" was showcased in the Annecy International Animated Film Festival in June 2015. In 2019, the season 3 episode, "Booth Buddies", was nominated an Annie Award for "Outstanding Writing in an Animated Television/Broadcast Production", and the season 3 finale, "Conquer", was also nominated an Annie Award for "Outstanding Storyboarding in an Animated Television/Broadcast Production". However, both lost to the Netflix animated series, Hilda.

Year	Award	Category	Nominee	Result	Ref.
2015	Annecy International Animated Film Festival	TV series	Episode: "Party with a Pony"	Nominated	
2015	5th Annual BTVA Voice Acting Awards	Best Female Vocal Performance in a Television Series in a Supporting Role	Dee Dee Rescher as Miss Skullnick	Nominated	
2016	43rd Annie Awards	Best Animated Television / Broadcast Production for Children	Star vs. the Forces of Evil, Episode: "Blood Moon Ball"	Nominated	
2016	43rd Annie Awards	Voice Acting in an Animated Television/Broadcast Production	Alan Tudyk as Ludo, Episode: Compilation from Series	Nominated	
2016	43rd Annie Awards	Editorial in an Animated Television/Broadcast Production	Ted Supa, Episode: "Storm the Castle"	Nominated	
2016	6th Annual BTVA Voice Acting Awards	Best Male Lead Vocal Performance in a Television Series	Adam McArthur as Marco Diaz	Won	
2016	6th Annual BTVA Voice Acting Awards	Best Female Lead Vocal Performance in a Television Series	Eden Sher as Star Butterfly	Won	
2016	6th Annual BTVA Voice Acting Awards	Best Female Vocal Performance in a Television Series in a Supporting Role	Jenny Slate as Pony Head	Nominated	
2016	6th Annual BTVA Voice Acting Awards	Best Female Vocal Performance in a Television Series in a Guest Role	Yvette Nicole Brown as Brigid	Nominated	
2016	6th Annual BTVA Voice Acting Awards	Best Vocal Ensemble in a Television Series	Star vs. the Forces of Evil	Won	
2017	7th Annual BTVA Voice Acting Awards	Best Female Lead Vocal Performance in a Television Series	Eden Sher as Star Butterfly	Nominated	
2018	45th Daytime Emmy Awards	Outstanding Individual Achievement in Animation	Michelle Park, Color Designer	Won	
2019	46th Annie Awards	Writing in an Animated Television/Broadcast Production	Episode: "Booth Buddies"	Nominated	
2019	46th Annie Awards	Storyboarding in an Animated Television/Broadcast Production	Sage Cotugno, (Note: Nominated as Sabrina Cotugno; Cotugno is non-binary and announced their name change in 2023.) Episode: "Conquer"	Nominated	
2019	Kids' Choice Awards Mexico 2019	Favorite Cartoon	Star vs. the Forces of Evil	Nominated	

== Merchandise ==
A comic book series titled Deep Trouble was written by storyboarder Zach Marcus and illustrated by character designer Devin Taylor, both of whom are part of the Star crew. They have been released monthly by Joe Books starting in September 2016. A Cinestory comic based on the show's first episode, "Star Comes to Earth", was also developed and published on May 31, 2016, with a second Cinestory comic, based on the season 2 episode "Starcrushed", published on July 30, 2019.

The book Star and Marco's Guide to Mastering Every Dimension, authored by Amber Benson and supervising producer Dominic Bisignano, was published on March 7, 2017. Another book for the series, titled The Book of Spells, authored by the show's creator, Daron Nefcy, alongside Benson and Bisignano, was published on September 11, 2018.

A plush toy of Star was released as a San Diego Comic-Con exclusive in July 2018 by a toy company named PhatMojo. It received a retail release later that year.

The series has also received a series of Pop! Vinyl figures from Funko, consisting of Star, Marco, Tom, and Ludo. A Mewberty Form Star was also made on December 20, 2018, but it was exclusive to Hot Topic stores.

== Future ==
Nefcy has stated that in the future she would like to see a continuation of the series, such as a film adaptation and a spin-off. However, as of August 2024 there are no official plans for a continuation.

Star vs. the Forces of Evil characters appeared in the Disney Channel original series Chibiverse which started airing on July 30, 2022.
