= List of Disney television series =

This is a list of television series produced or distributed by The Walt Disney Company and its subsidiaries.

== Disney Television Studios ==
- Amazing Animals (1996–99)

=== 20th Television ===
Formerly known as 20th Century Fox Television.

==== ABC Signature ====
Formerly known as Touchstone Television and ABC Studios.

==== Touchstone Television ====
Formerly known as Fox 21 Television Studios.

=== 20th Television Animation ===
Formerly known as Fox Television Animation.

=== Walt Disney Television ===
Title	Original run	Co-production with	Network
Walt Disney's Disneyland (1954–58); Walt Disney Presents (1958–61); Walt Disney's Wonderful World of Color (1961–69); Disney's Wonderful World (1979–81); Walt Disney (1981–83); The Disney Sunday Movie (1986–88); The Magical World of Disney (1988–90); The Wonderful World of Disney (1969–79, 1983–87, 1991–present)	1954–present		ABC (1954–61, 1986–88, and 1997–present); NBC (1961–81 and 1988–91); CBS (1981–83, 1991–97)
The Mickey Mouse Club	1955–59, 1977–78, 1989–94		ABC (1955–59); Syndication (1977–79); The Disney Channel (1989–96)
Zorro	1957–59		ABC
The Mouse Factory	1971–73		Syndicated
Herbie, the Love Bug	1982		CBS
Small & Frye	1983		CBS
Gun Shy	1983		CBS
Zorro and Son	1983		CBS
Good Morning, Mickey!	1983–86		The Disney Channel
Donald Duck Presents	1983–85		The Disney Channel
Welcome to Pooh Corner	1983–85	Left Coast Television	The Disney Channel
You and Me Kid	1983–86		The Disney Channel
Contraption	1983–89		The Disney Channel
Mousercise	1983–86		The Disney Channel
EPCOT Magazine	1984–86		The Disney Channel
Disney Family Album	1984–86		The Disney Channel
Dumbo's Circus	1985–88	Left Coast Television	The Disney Channel
Sidekicks	1986–87	Motown Productions	The Disney Channel/ABC
Videopolis	1987–89		The Disney Channel
Teen Angel	1989		The Disney Channel
Great Expectations	1989	HTV, Primetime Television Ltd., Tesauro Television	The Disney Channel
Brand New Life	1989–90	NBC Productions	NBC
Little Mermaid's Island	1990	Jim Henson Productions	Unaired
The 100 Lives of Black Jack Savage	1991	Stephen J. Cannell Productions	NBC
Dinosaurs	1991–94	Michael Jacobs Productions; Jim Henson Productions	ABC
The Torkelsons	1991–92	Michael Jacobs Productions	NBC
Adventures in Wonderland	1992–95	Betty Productions	Syndication
The Secret of Lost Creek	1992		The Disney Channel
Bill Nye the Science Guy	1993–98	KCTS Seattle; McKenna/Gottlieb Producers, Inc. Rabbit Ears Productions	Syndication/PBS
Walt Disney World Inside Out	1994–97		The Disney Channel
Sing Me a Story with Belle	1995–97	Patrick Davidson Productions	Syndication
Brotherly Love	1996–97	Witt/Thomas Productions	The WB
Doug	1996–99	Jumbo Pictures	ABC
Smart Guy	1997–99	de Passe Entertainment; Danny Kallis Productions	The WB
Honey, I Shrunk the Kids: The TV Show	1997–2000	Plymouth Productions; St. Clare Entertainment	Syndication
PB&J Otter	1998–2000	Jumbo Pictures	Playhouse Disney

=== Walt Disney Television Alternative ===
Title	Years	Network	Notes
The Final Straw	2022	ABC	co-production with Omaha Productions and B17 Entertainment
Clame to Fame	2022–present	ABC	co-production with Kinetic Content
Back in the Groove	2022–present	Hulu	co-production with Beyond Media Rights
The Parent Test	2022–present	ABC	co-production with Eureka Productions

== Walt Disney Studios ==
=== Walt Disney Pictures ===
Title	Original run	Production company	Network
The Beatles: Get Back	2021	Apple Corps; Wingnut Films	Disney+

== Disney Kids & Family ==
Title	Years	Network	Notes
Flash Forward	1995–97	Disney Channel	co-production for Atlantis Films
Going Wild with Jeff Corwin	1996–99	Disney Channel	co-production with Popular Arts Entertainment
Disney Channel in Concert	1997–2001	Disney Channel	
Omba Mokomba	1997–99	Disney Channel	co-production with Popular Arts Entertainment
Out of the Box	1998–2004	Disney Channel	co-production with OOTB, Inc.
2 Hour Tour	1998–2000	Disney Channel	
Bug Juice	1998–2001	Disney Channel	co-production with Evolution Media
Off the Wall	1998–99	Disney Channel	co-production with Media Arts Entertainment and Vin Di Bona Productions
Mad Libs	1998–99	Disney Channel	co-production with Slam Dunk Productions and Dick Clark Productions
The Famous Jett Jackson	1998–2001	Disney Channel	co-production with Alliance Atlantis and Every Kids is JP Kids (Note: Currently owned by WildBrain.)
So Weird	1999–2001	Disney Channel	Sugar Entertainment, Ltd. (seasons 1–2); No Equal Entertainment, Inc. (season 3); Fair Dinkum Productions
The Jersey	1999–2004	Disney Channel	co-production with Lynch Entertainment
Z Games	1999	Disney Channel	
Even Stevens	2000–03	Disney Channel	Brookwell McNamara Entertainment
In a Heartbeat	2000–01	Disney Channel	co-production with AAC Kids
Totally Circus	2000	Disney Channel	Buena Vista Television
Lizzie McGuire	2001–04	Disney Channel	co-production with Stan Rogow Productions
Totally Hoops	2001	Disney Channel	co-production with Evolution Media
The Book of Pooh	2001–03	Playhouse Disney	co-production with Shadow Projects
The Proud Family	2001–05	Disney Channel	co-production with Jambalaya Studios
Stanley	2001–04	Playhouse Disney	co-production with Cartoon Pizza
Totally in Tune	2002	Disney Channel	co-production with Evolution Media
That's So Raven	2003–07	Disney Channel	co-production with Brookwell McNamara Entertainment (seasons 1–3), That's So Productions and Warren & Rinsler Productions (season 4)
JoJo's Circus	2003–07	Playhouse Disney	co-production with Cartoon Pizza and Cuppa Coffee Studios
Phil of the Future	2004–06	Disney Channel	co-production with 2929 Productions
Higglytown Heroes	2004–08	Playhouse Disney	co-production with Wild Brain and Happy Nest
Breakfast with Bear	2005	Playhouse Disney	co-production with Shadow Projects
Little Einsteins	2005–09	Playhouse Disney	co-production with Curious Pictures and The Baby Einstein Company
Johnny and the Sprites	2005–09	Playhouse Disney	co-production with Happy Puppet Productions and Homegirl Productions (season 1)
Handy Manny	2006–13	Playhouse Disney/Disney Junior	co-production with Nelvana
Bunnytown	2007–08	Playhouse Disney	co-production with Baker Coogan Productions and Spiffy Pictures
Imagination Movers	2008–13	Playhouse Disney/Disney Junior	co-production with Penn/Bright Entertainment and Zydeco Productions
Aaron Stone	2009–10	Disney XD	co-production with Shaftesbury Films
Zeke and Luther	2009–12	Disney XD	co-production with Turtle Rock Productions
Jungle Junction	2009–12	Playhouse Disney/Disney Junior	co-production with Spider Eye Productions
PrankStars	2011	Disney Channel	co-production with Zoo Productions
Doc McStuffins	2012–20	Disney Junior	co-production with Brown Bag Films
Code: 9	2012	Disney Channel	co-production with Evolution Media
Randy Cunningham: 9th Grade Ninja	2012–15	Disney XD	co-production with Titmouse, Inc. and Boulder Media
Henry Hugglemonster	2013–15	Disney Junior	co-production with Brown Bag Films
Sheriff Callie's Wild West	2014–17	Disney Junior	co-production with WildBrain Entertainment (season 1) and Wild Canary Animation (season 2)
Win, Lose or Draw	2014	Disney Channel	co-production with Entertain the Brutes
Kirby Buckets	2014–17	Disney XD	co-production with Horizon Productions
Miles from Tomorrowland	2015–18	Disney Junior	co-production with Wild Canary Animation
Goldie and Bear	2015–18	Disney Junior	co-production with Milk Barn Entertainment (season 1) and Titmouse, Inc. (season 2)
Stuck in the Middle	2016–18	Disney Channel	co-production with International Donut Fund Productions and Horizon Productions
Walk the Prank	2016–18	Disney XD	co-production with Blackbird Films, Sullen Child and Horizon Productions
Mech-X4	2016	Disney XD	co-production with Marmel Dynamics and Omnifilm Entertainment
Andi Mack	2017–19	Disney Channel	co-production with Go Dog Go, MM Productions and Horizon Productions
Puppy Dog Pals	2017–23	Disney Junior	co-production with Wild Canary Animation
Vampirina	2017–21	Disney Junior	co-production with Brown Bag Films
Bug Juice: My Adventures at Camp	2018	Disney Channel	co-production with Evolution Media
Fast Layne	2019	Disney Channel	co-production with Lakeshore Productions and Omnifilm Entertainment
Just Roll with It	2019–21	Disney Channel	co-production with Blackbird Films, Sullen Child and Kenwood TV Productions
T.O.T.S.	2019–22	Disney Junior	co-production with Titmouse, Inc.
Gabby Duran & the Unsittables	2019–21	Disney Channel	co-production with Omnifilm Entertainment and Two Gorgeous Gentleman
The Rocketeer	2019–20	Disney Junior	co-production with Wild Canary Animation
High School Musical: The Musical: The Series	2019–23	Disney+	co-production with Salty Pictures
Disney Fam Jam	2020	Disney Channel	co-production with Matador Content
Mira, Royal Detective	2020–22	Disney Junior	co-production with Wild Canary Animation
Secrets of Sulphur Springs	2021–23	Disney Channel	co-production with Gwave Productions
The Chicken Squad	2021–22	Disney Junior	co-production with Wild Canary Animation
Disney's Magic Bake-Off	2021	Disney Channel	co-production with Tastemade
Ultra Violet & Black Scorpion	2022	Disney Channel	co-production with Gwave Productions
Eureka!	2022–23	Disney Junior	co-production with Brown Bag Films
SuperKitties	2023–present	Disney Jr.	co-production with Sony Pictures Television and Sony Pictures Television Kids
Saturdays	2023	Disney Channel	co-production with Over the Hump Production Inc., Genius Entertainment, and Gwave Productions
Pupstruction	2023–present	Disney Jr.	co-production with Titmouse, Inc.
Pretty Freekin Scary	2023	Disney Channel	co-production with CakeStart Entertainment
Ariel	2024–present	Disney Jr.	co-production with Wild Canary Animation
Kindergarten: The Musical	2024–present	Disney Jr.	co-production with OddBot Studios
RoboGobo	2025–present	Disney Jr.	co-production with Brown Bag Films
Electric Bloom	2025–present	Disney Channel	co-production with Echo & Cici Productions, Fox & Lewis, Diane Warren + Bahareh Batmang and Kenwood TV Productions
Vampirina: Teenage Vampire	2025–present	Disney Channel	co-production with Cross Hoge Productions, Chorus Boy and Kenwood TV Productions

=== Jetix ===
Title	Original run	Production company
The Tofus	2004–05	SIP Animation; CinéGroupe
Super Robot Monkey Team Hyperforce Go!	2004–06	Jetix Animation Concepts
W.I.T.C.H.	2004–06	SIP Animation
A.T.O.M.	2005–06	SIP Animation
Get Ed	2005–06	Jetix Animation Concepts
Ōban Star-Racers	2006	Jetix Europe; Sav! The World Productions
Pucca	2006–08	Jetix Europe; VOOZ Character System; Studio B Productions
Yin Yang Yo!	2006–09	Jetix Animation Concepts
Combo Niños	2008	SIP Animation

=== Streamboat Willie Productions ===
Streamboat Willie Productions produces live-action programs for Disney+. These programs are copyrighted to Disney Enterprises.

Title	Original run	Production company	Network
The Imagineering Story	2019	Iwerks & Co.	Disney+
One Day at Disney Shorts	2019–20		Disney+
Shop Class	2020	Hangar 55	Disney+
It's a Dog's Life with Bill Farmer	2020	National Geographic	Disney+
The Big Fib	2020	Haymaker TV	Disney+
Earth to Ned	2020–21	The Jim Henson Company, Marwar Junction Productions	Disney+
Becoming	2020		Disney+
On Pointe	2020	DCTV, Imagine Documentaries	Disney+
Behind the Attraction	2021–23	Seven Bucks Productions, The Nacelle Company	Disney+
Turning the Tables with Robin Roberts	2021–23		Disney+
Among the Stars	2021	Fulwell 73 Productions, Olive Bridge Entertainment	Disney+
Foodtastic	2021	Endemol Shine	Disney+
Sketchbook	2022		Disney+
The Quest	2022	Court Five, New Media Collective, Scout Productions	Disney+
Family Reboot	2022		Disney+
Growing Up	2022		Disney+
Chasing Waves	2023		Disney+
Rennervations	2023		Disney+
Choir	2024		Disney+
Harlem Ice	2025–present		Disney+
People & Places	2025–present		Disney+

== Freeform ==
Freeform is the trade name of International Family Entertainment, Inc.

Title	Years	Network	Notes
Big Brother Jake	1990–94	The Family Channel	
That's My Dog	1991–95	The Family Channel	co-production with Albert Wallace Enterprises and NorthStar Entertainment Group (Note: The first two seasons are currently owned by the Christian Broadcasting Network.)
Baby Races	1993–94	The Family Channel	co-production with Robert Sherman Productions
All-New Captain Kangaroo	1998–99	Fox Family Channel	season 2
Mister Moose's Fun Time	1998–99	Fox Family Channel	
Famous Families	1998–99	Fox Family Channel	co-production with Glen Avenue Films, Foxstar Productions and Fox Television Studios
The New Addams Family	1998–99	Fox Family Channel; YTV	co-production with Saban Entertainment and Shavick Entertainment
World Gone Wild	1999–2000	Fox Family Channel	co-production with 20th Century Fox Television
Scariest Places on Earth	2000–02	Fox Family/ABC Family	
State of Grace	2001–02	Fox Family/ABC Family	
My Life Is a Sitcom	2003–04	ABC Family	
The Brendan Leonard Show	2003	ABC Family	
Switched!	2003–04	ABC Family	co-production with Evolution Media and Charles Cook Productions
Knock First	2003–04	ABC Family	co-production with Scout Productions
Switched Up!	2004	ABC Family	
Las Vegas Garden of Love	2005	ABC Family	
Brat Camp	2005	ABC Family	
Venus and Serena: For Real	2005	ABC Family	
Kicked Out	2005	ABC Family	
Looks of Love	2006	ABC Family	
Back on Campus	2006	ABC Family	
Lincoln Heights	2007–09	ABC Family	
GRΣΣK	2007–11	ABC Family	co-production with Piller/Sagan Company
The Middleman	2008	ABC Family	
The Secret Life of the American Teenager	2008–13	ABC Family	co-production with Brendavision! and American Teenager Inc.
Make It or Break It	2009–12	ABC Family	as ProdCo Original co-production with Pirates Cove Entertaining and Hollycake (season 2)
Roommates	2009	ABC Family	co-production with Acme Productions
10 Things I Hate About You	2009–10	ABC Family	
Huge	2010	ABC Family	co-production with Dooley & Company Productions, Half Full Entertainment and Alloy Entertainment
Melissa & Joey	2010–15	ABC Family	co-production with Hartbreak Films and JL Veritas
Switched at Birth	2011–17	ABC Family/Freeform	
The Nine Lives of Chloe King	2011	ABC Family	
Jane by Design	2012	ABC Family	
Bunheads	2012–13	ABC Family	
Beverly Hills Nannies	2012	ABC Family	co-production with Evolution Media
Baby Daddy	2012–17	ABC Family/Freeform	co-production with Don't Borrow Trouble
The Fosters	2013–18	ABC Family/Freeform	co-production with Blazing Elm Entertainment, Nitelite Entertainment and Nuyorican Productions
Twisted	2013–14	ABC Family	
Chasing Life	2014–15	ABC Family	
Mystery Girls	2014	ABC Family	
Freak Out	2014–15	ABC Family	
Young & Hungry	2014–18	ABC Family/Freeform	co-production with CBS Studios, The Tannembaum Company, Critical Content, Waffle Toaster Productions and Blondie Girl Productions
Stitchers	2015–17	ABC Family/Freeform	
Becoming Us	2015	ABC Family	co-production with Ryan Seacrest Productions and Three Sisters Inc.
Job or No Job	2015	ABC Family	co-production with Studio Lambert and All3Media America
Next Step Realty: NYC	2015	ABC Family	co-production with Lincoln Square Productions
Startup U	2015	ABC Family	co-production with Ugly Brother Studios
Kevin from Work	2015	ABC Family	co-production with Wonderland Sound and Vision, Kapital Entertainment and 40 or 50 Years, Inc.
Beyond	2017–18	Freeform	co-production with Automatik and Imperative Entertainment
Truth & Iliza	2017	Freeform	co-production with Avalon Television
Alone Together	2018	Freeform	
Siren	2018–20	Freeform	previously titled The Deep co-production with Stockton Drive, Inc.
Disney's Fairy Tale Weddings	2018–20	Freeform/Disney+	co-production with T Group Productions
Good Trouble	2019–24	Freeform	co-production with J.J Productions, Nuyorican Productions and Blazing Blm Entertainment
Party of Five	2020	Freeform	co-production with Pamplona Productions, Mad Ben Productions, and Sony Pictures Television
Everything's Gonna Be Okay	2020–21	Freeform	co-production with Avalon Television
Motherland: Fort Salem	2020–22	Freeform	co-production with Gary Sanchez Productions, Hyperobject Industries and Well Underway
Love in the Time of Corona	2020	Freeform	co-production with Anonymous Content
Kal Penn Approves This Message	2020	Freeform	co-production with Embassy Row
Cruel Summer	2021–23	Freeform	co-production with Entertainment One (distributor) and Iron Ocean Productions
The Deep End	2022	Freeform	co-production with The Documentary Group
Keep This Between Us	2022	Freeform	co-production with Vox Media Studios and The Front Media
The Come Up	2022	Freeform	co-production with Cousins
Love Trip: Paris	2023	Freeform	
Grand Cayman: Secrets in Paradise	2024	Freeform	co-production with Haymaker East and This Way Out Media
Royal Rules of Ohio	2024	Freeform	co-production with Entertainment One
Sasha Reid and the Midnight Order	2024	Freeform	co-production with XTR
Wayne Brady: The Family Remix	2024	Freeform	

== Onyx Collective ==
Title	Years	Network	Notes
Reasonable Doubt	2022	Hulu	co-production with ABC Signature, Good Home Training, Simpson Street and Wilmore Films
The Hair Tales	2022	Hulu; OWN	

=== Saban Entertainment / SIP Animation ===
==== Fox Kids Worldwide ====
- Attack of the Killer Tomatoes (1990–91) (co-production with Marvel Productions)
- Bobby's World (1990–98) (co-production with Alevy Productions and Film Roman) (Note: Currently owned by Howie Mandel, with distribution rights licensed to Splash Entertainment.)
- Peter Pan and the Pirates (1990–91) (co-production with Southern Star Productions and TMS Entertainment)
- Piggsburg Pigs! (1990–91) (co-production with The Fred Silverman Company and Ruby-Spears Enterprises)
- Zazoo U (1990–91) (co-production with Film Roman)
- Eek! The Cat (1992–97, later retitled Eek! Stravaganza in 1994)
  - The Terrible Thunderlizards (1993–97)
  - Klutter! (1995–96)
- Count DeClues' Mystery Castle (1993; TV special)
- Grunt & Punt (1994–95) (co-production with NFL Films) (Note: Currently owned by NFL Films.)
- The Fox Cubhouse (1994–96)
  - Jim Henson's Animal Show (1994–96)
  - Johnson and Friends (U.S. version) (1994–96)
  - Rimba's Island (1994–96) (co-production with DIC Productions L.P.)
  - Britt Allcroft's Magic Adventures of Mumfie (1995–96)
  - Budgie the Little Helicopter (1995–96)
  - Red Planet (1994)
- The Tick (1994–96)
- Life with Louie (1994–98)
- Big Dreamers (1996–98; interstitial series)
- Mowgli: The New Adventures of the Jungle Book (1998) (co-production with Wolfcrest Entertainment, Franklin/Waterman Worldwide and Alliance Entertainment)
- Mad Jack the Pirate (1998–99)
- Moolah Beach (2001)

=== SoapNet ===
- SoapCenter (2000–03)
- Soap Talk (2002–06)
- They Started on Soaps (2003–04)
- Soapography (2004–05)
- 1 Day With (2004–05)
- I Wanna Be a Soap Star (2004–07)
- The Fashionista Diaries (2007)
- Relative Madness (2008)
- Greg Behrendt's Wake Up Call (2009)
- Holidate (2009)
- What If... (2010)

== ABC Entertainment ==
- General Hospital (1963–present)
- The American Sportsman (1965–86)
- One Life to Live (1968–12)
- All My Children (1970–11)
- ABC Afterschool Special (1972–97)
- Schoolhouse Rock! (1973–84; 1993–96; 2002; 2008–09)
- Ryan's Hope (1975–89) (co-production with Labine-Mayer Productions)
- ABC Weekend Specials (1977–97)
- The Littles (1983–85) (co-production with DIC Audiovisuel)
- Little Clowns of Happytown (1987–88)
- America's Funniest Home Videos (1989–present; with Vin Di Bona Productions)
- Port Charles (1997–2003)
- The View (1997–present)
- You Don't Know Jack (2001)
- General Hospital: Night Shift (2007–08)
- The Chew (2011–18)
- The Revolution (2012)
- Soul of a Nation (2021–present)
- Mike Tyson: The Knockout (2021)
- Superstar (2021–22)

=== ABC News ===
==== ABC News Studios ====
Title	Years	Network	Notes
Wild Crime	2021–present	Hulu	
City of Angels | City of Death	2021–present	Hulu	co-production with Highway 41 Productions
Let the World See	2022	ABC	co-production with Kapital Entertainment, Roc Nation, Westbrook Studios and Cobble Hill Films
Keeper of the Ashes: The Oklahoma Girl Scout Murders	2022	Hulu	
Have You Seen This Man?	2022	Hulu	
Mormon No More	2022	Hulu	
The Murders Before the Marathon	2022	Hulu	co-production with Anonymous Content and Story Syndicate
Where Is Private Dulaney?	2022–present	Hulu	co-production with Show of Force and Versus Pictures
Death in the Dorms	2023	Hulu	co-production with The Intellectual Property Corporation and Yes, Like the River
Web of Death	2023	Hulu	co-production with Blink Films
Killing Country	2023	Hulu	co-production with Kaepernick Media
Still Missing Morgan	2023	Hulu	co-production with Scott Free Productions, 5Star Productions, NLA Productions and Mad Possom Pictures

==== Lincoln Square Productions ====
Title	Years	Network	Co-production with
Karaoke Battle USA	2011	ABC	
Final Witness	2012	ABC	
The Assets	2014	ABC	Baltic Films Services
20/20: In an Instant	2015–18	ABC	Committee Films
Save My Life: Boston Trauma	2015	ABC	
Boston EMS	2015–16	ABC	
Madoff	2016	ABC	ABC Studios
People's List	2016	ABC	
People Icons	2017	ABC	
The Last Defense	2018	ABC	Xcon Productions, JuVee Productions
1969	2019	ABC	

== Disney Platform Distribution ==
=== Disney–ABC Domestic Television ===
Note: Formerly known as Disney–ABC Home Entertainment and Television Distribution.

- At the Movies (originally Siskel & Ebert & the Movies/At the Movies with Ebert and Roeper) (1986–2010)
- Today's Business (1986–87)
- Win, Lose or Draw (1987–90; w/Burt & Bert Productions and Kline & Friends)
- Live with Kelly and Ryan (1988–present; w/ WABC-TV)
- Teen Win, Lose or Draw (1989–92; with Jay Wolpert Productions/Stone Stanley Productions)
- The Challengers (1990–91; w/Dick Clark Productions and Ron Greenberg Productions)
- The Disney Afternoon (1990–97; syndicated programming block)
- Saturday Disney (1990–2016; co-production with Seven Network)
- Bill Nye the Science Guy (1993–98; w/KCTS Seattle, McKenna/Gottlieb Producers, Inc. and Rabbit Ears Productions)
- Sing Me a Story with Belle (1995–99)
- The LA Thing (1996)
- Debt (1996–98; w/ Faded Denim Productions and Lifetime)
- Make Me Laugh (1997–98; w/ Dove Four Point Productions)
- The Keenen Ivory Wayans Show (1997–98)
- Disney's One Saturday Morning (1997–2002; programming block exclusively for ABC stations)
- Win Ben Stein's Money (1997–2003; w/Valleycrest Productions and Comedy Central)
- Rolie Polie Olie (1998–2004; w/Nelvana, Métal Hurlant Productions and Sparx*/Sparkling Animation)
- Disney's One Too (1999–2003; programming block exclusively for UPN stations)
- Your Big Break (1999–2001; with Dick Clark Productions and Endemol)
- The Ainsley Harriott Show (2000) with Valleycrest Productions and Merv Griffin Entertainment
- Iyanla (2001–2002)
- The Wayne Brady Show (2001–04)
- Who Wants to Be a Millionaire (2002–2019; w/ Valleycrest Productions, Times Square Studios, 2waytraffic)
- The Eyes of Nye (2005) (distributor; produced by KCTS-TV)
- Legend of the Seeker (2008–10)
- Katie (2012–14) (co-produced by KAC Productions)
- On the Red Carpet (2013–14)
- FABLife (2015–16; w/ Summerdale Productions)
- Right This Minute (2016–present; w/ MagicDust Television, Cox Media Group, Raycom Media and E. W. Scripps Company)
- Pickler and Ben (2017–19) (co-production with E. W. Scripps Company, Happy Street Entertainment and Sandbox Entertainment)
- Tamron Hall (2019–present) (co-produced by Summerdale Productions and May Avenue Productions (season 1))

=== Valleycrest Productions ===
Title	Years	Network	Notes
Mike and Maty	1994–96	ABC	
Win Ben Stein's Money	1997–2003	Comedy Central	
Who Wants to Be a Millionaire	1999–2021	ABC/Syndication	co-production with 2waytraffic (1999–2019), Embassy Row and Kimmelot (2020–present)
Who Wants to Be a Millionaire: Canadian Edition	2000	CTV Television Network	co-production with Celador

== Disney Experiences ==
Title	Years	Network	Notes
Star Darlings	2015–16	Disney Channel	co-production with OddBot
Disney Family Sundays	2019–20	Disney+	
Pixar in Real Life	2019–20	Disney+	
Be Our Chef	2020	Disney+	co-production with INE Entertainment

=== The Muppets Studio ===
Title	Years	Network	Notes
The Muppet Show	1976–81	Syndication; ITV (UK)	produced by Henson Associates, ATV, and ITC Entertainment
Jim Henson's Muppet Babies	1984–91	CBS	produced by Henson Associates/Jim Henson Productions and Marvel Productions
Little Muppet Monsters	1985	CBS	produced by Henson Associates and Marvel Productions
The Jim Henson Hour	1989–90	NBC	produced by Jim Henson Productions "MuppeTelevision" segments, "Miss Piggy's Hollywood", and "Secrets of the Muppets"
Muppet Time	1994–95	Nickelodeon (Nick Jr.)	produced by Jim Henson Productions interstitial series
Muppets Tonight	1996–98	ABC/Disney Channel	produced by Jim Henson Productions
Bear in the Big Blue House	1997–99; 2002–06	Disney Channel (Playhouse Disney)	produced by Jim Henson Television and Shadow Projects

== Walt Disney Studios Home Entertainment ==
Title	Original run	Co-production with	Network
Disney Sing-Along Songs	1986–2006		Direct-to-video

== International Content and Operations Group ==
Title	Original run	Co-production with	Network
Stitch!	2008–11	Madhouse; Shin-Ei Animation	TV Tokyo; TV Asahi; Disney Channel (Japan)
Stitch & Ai	2017	Anhui Xinhua Media/Panimation Hwakai Media	CCTV-1

=== The Walt Disney Company Latin America ===
Title	Original run	Co-production with	Network
Zapping Zone	2001–12		Disney Channel
Violetta	2012–15	Pol-ka	Disney Channel (Latin American)
The U-Mix Show	2012–14		Disney Channel (Latin American)
Intertwined	2021–present	Buena Vista International; Pampa Films; Gloriamundi Productions	Disney+

=== Walt Disney EMEA Productions ===
Title	Original run	Co-production with	Network
The Evermoor Chronicles	2014–17	Lime Pictures; All3Media	Disney Channel (British and Irish)
PJ Masks	2015–present	Entertainment One; Frog Box; TeamTO; France Télévisions; TF1 Group	Disney Channel; Disney Junior; France 5 TF1
The Lodge	2016–17	Zodiak Kids Studios	Disney Channel (British and Irish)
101 Dalmatian Street	2019–20	Passion Animation Studios; Atomic Cartoons	Disney Channel; Disney+
Chip 'n' Dale: Park Life	2021–24	Xilam Animation; The Walt Disney Company France	Disney+
Extraordinary	2023–present	Sid Gentle Films	Disney+ Star

== Short series ==
Title	Original run	Production company	Network
A Disney Moment	1980s	Walt Disney Television	The Disney Channel
D-TV	1984–88	Walt Disney Television	The Disney Channel
D-TV^{2}	1988–89	Walt Disney Television	The Disney Channel
Discover Magazine	1992–95	Walt Disney Television	The Disney Channel
Ovation	1992–96	Walt Disney Television	The Disney Channel
Making Their Mark	1993–97	Walt Disney Television	The Disney Channel
Inside Out Spotlite	1994–96	Walt Disney Television	The Disney Channel
Joke Time	1996–98	Walt Disney Television	The Disney Channel
Movie Surfers	1997–present	Walt Disney Television; Disney Channels Worldwide	Evolution Media
Behind the Ears	1997–99; 2007–08	Walt Disney Television; Disney Channels Worldwide	Disney Channel; Playhouse Disney
Magic Drawings	1997–98	Walt Disney Television	Disney Channel
Frankenguy and the Professor	1997	Colossal Pictures	Disney Channel
Disney's One Saturday Morning: Mrs. Munger's Class (1997–98); Manny the Uncanny; Great Minds Think For Themselves; How Much Stuff Can an Elephant Crush?; How Things Werk; Find Out Why!; The Monkey Boys; What's Up With That?; Tube Dwellers; Flynndiggery Do!; Flipbook; Centerville (1999); Manny's America (1999–2000); What's the Diff? (1999–2000)	1997–2000	Walt Disney Television	ABC
The Mix-ups	1998	Colossal Pictures	Disney Channel
Pet Stop	1998	Walt Disney Television	Disney Channel
Project Time	1998	Walt Disney Television	Disney Channel
Circle Time	1999	Riverstreet Productions	Playhouse Disney
Imagineer That!	1999–2001; 2005–07	Walt Disney Television; Disney Channels Worldwide	Disney Channel
Discover Spot	2000	King Rollo Films; Walt Disney Home Video	Direct-to-video
Mike's Super Short Show	2002–06	7ATE9 Entertainment	Disney Channel
Cool Pets	2002–05	Disney Channel	
Show Your Stuff	2003–06	Disney Channel	
Project Playtime	2003–07	7ATE9 Entertainment	Playhouse Disney
Disney 411	2004–06	Disney Channel	
Shanna's Show	2004	Unbound Studios	Playhouse Disney
Adventures of Nutrition with Captain Carlos	2004	Walt Disney Television Animation	Playhouse Disney
Toon News	2004–05	Disney Channels Worldwide	Toon Disney International
Shane's Kindergarten Countdown	2005	Unbound Studios	Playhouse Disney
Feeling Good with JoJo	2006–08	Cartoon Pizza; Cuppa Coffee Studios	Playhouse Disney
Choo Choo Soul	2006–11	Disney Channels Worldwide	Playhouse Disney; Disney Junior
Disney Channel Games	2006–08	Disney Channel	
Disney 365	2006–14	Disney Channel	
Disney's Really Short Report	2007–09	7ATE9 Entertainment	Disney Channel
As the Bell Rings	2007–09	It's a Laugh Productions	
Happy Monster Band	2007–08	Kickstart Productions	Playhouse Disney
Disney Channel's 3 Minute Game Show	2007–10	7ATE9 Entertainment	Disney Channel
Can You Teach My Alligator Manners?	2008–09	Walt Disney Television Animation	Playhouse Disney
Cars Toons	2008–14	Pixar Animation Studios; Disney Television Animation	Toon Disney; Disney Channel
Brian O'Brian	2008	Disney Channel	
Tasty Time with ZeFronk	2008–11	OddBot Inc.	Playhouse Disney; Disney Junior
Whiffle and Fuzz	2008–09	Disney Channels Worldwide	Playhouse Disney
Cars Toons	2008–13	Walt Disney Pictures; Pixar Animation Studios	Disney Channel
Leo Little's Big Show	2009–10	7ATE9 Entertainment	Disney Channel
TTI: The Time I...	2009–11	Riverstreet Productions	Disney Channel
Where Is Warehouse Mouse?	2009–10	Penn/Bright Entertainment; Zydeco Productions	Playhouse Disney
Have a Laugh!	2009–12	Disney Channels Worldwide; 7ATE9 Entertainment	Disney Channel
Disney's Friends for Change	2009	Disney Channel	
Moises Rules!	2009	7ATE9 Entertainment	Disney XD
Handy Manny's School for Tools	2010	Walt Disney Television Animation; Nelvana	Playhouse Disney
Dance-a-Lot Robot	2010	Kickstart Productions	Playhouse Disney
Disney's Friends for Change Games	2011	Disney Channel	
A Poem Is...	2011–13	Disney Junior	
Where's My Water?: Swampy's Underground Adventures	2012–13	Animax Entertainment	Disney.com; Disney Channel
Talking Friends	2012	Outfit7 Entertainment; Karactaz Animation	Disney.com; YouTube
The Coppertop Flop Show	2013–14	Artists First	Disney Channel
Dogs Rule! Cats... Not So Much	2014–16	Diphthong Productions; It's A Laugh Productions	Disney Channel
Nina Needs to Go!	2014	ArthurCox	Disney Junior
Oh My Disney	2014–present	Disney Consumer Products	YouTube
Disney Tsum Tsum	2015–17	Polygon Pictures	Disney Junior; Disney Channel
Whisker Haven	2015–17	Ghostbot Studios; Disney Publishing	DisneyNow; Disney Junior
Mickey Meows Club	2016	Disney Channels Worldwide	Disney Channel
Disney QUIZney	2018–19	Disney Channels Worldwide	Disney Channel; DisneyNow

== Television films, specials, and miniseries ==
=== Disney Television Studios ===
==== Walt Disney Television Alternative ====
- The Great American Tag Sale with Martha Stewart (2022)
- Finding Harmony (2022) (co-production with Joanna Coles Productions and Get Lifted Film Co.)
- Beauty and the Beast: A 30th Celebration (2022) (co-production with Done and Dusted and Electric Somewhere Co.)
- Schoolhouse Rock! 50th Anniversary Singalong (2023) (co-production with Done and Dusted)

==== Walt Disney Television ====
- One Hour in Wonderland (1950)
- The Walt Disney Christmas Show (1951)
- Dateline: Disneyland (1955)
- The Mickey Mouse Club Serials (1956)
- The Grand Opening of Walt Disney World (1971)
- Herbie Day at Disneyland (1974)
- Sandy in Disneyland (1974)
- Christmas in Disneyland (1976)
- NBC Salutes the 25th Anniversary of the Wonderful World of Disney (1978)
- Christmas at Walt Disney World (1978)
- Kraft Salutes Disneyland's 25th Anniversary (1980)
- Kraft Salutes Walt Disney World's 10th Anniversary (1982)
- Backstage at Disney (1983)
- Hansel and Gretel (1983)
- A Disney Channel Christmas (1983)
- Black Arrow (1984)
- Vacationing with Mickey and Friends (1984)
- Samantha Smith Goes to Washington: Campaign '84 (1984)
- Donald Duck's 50th Birthday (1984)
- Disneyland's 30th Anniversary Celebration (1985)
- Ludwig's Think Tank (1985)
- Disneyland's Summer Vacation Party (1986)
- D-TV Valentine (1986)
- Fluppy Dogs (1986)
- Walt Disney World: A Dream Come True (1986)
- Disney's Living Seas (1986)
- D-TV Doggone Valentine (1987)
- Golden Anniversary of Snow White and the Seven Dwarfs (1987)
- An All New Adventure of Disney's Sport Goofy (1987)
- Sport Goofy in Soccermania (1987)
- D-TV Monster Hits (1987)
- Down and Out with Donald Duck (1987)
- Walt Disney World Celebrity Circus (1987)
- Totally Minnie (1988)
- Walt Disney World 4th of July Spectacular (1988)
- Roger Rabbit and the Secrets of Toon Town (1988)
- Disney's Magic in the Magic Kingdom (1988)
- Mickey's 60th Birthday (1988)
- Here's to You, Mickey Mouse (1988)
- The Making of Oliver & Company (1988)
- Spooner (1989)
- Ernest Goes to Splash Mountain (1989)
- The Muppets at Walt Disney World (1990)
- The Muppets Celebrate Jim Henson (1990)
- The Best of Disney: 50 Years of Magic (1991)
- The Dream Is Alive: 20th Anniversary Celebration of Walt Disney World (1991)
- Fantasia: The Making of a Masterpiece (1991)
- The Making of Aladdin: A Whole New World (1992)
- Disney's Christmas Fantasy on Ice (1992)
- For Our Children (1993)
- Miracle Child (1993)
- Walt Disney World Journey Into Magic (1993)
- Disney's Night of Magic (1993)
- The Wonderful World of Disney: 40 Years of Television Magic (1994)
- The Making of A Goofy Movie (1995)
- The Christmas Tree (1996)
- Disney's Beauty and the Beast: A Concert on Ice (1996)
- A Valentine for You (1999)

=== Walt Disney Studios ===
==== Walt Disney Animation Studios ====
- Prep & Landing (2009) (co-production with Walt Disney Pictures)
- Prep & Landing: Operation: Secret Santa (2010) (co-production with Walt Disney Pictures)
- Prep & Landing: Naughty vs. Nice (2011) (co-production with Walt Disney Pictures)

==== Pixar ====
- Toy Story of Terror! (2013) (co-production with Walt Disney Pictures)
- Toy Story That Time Forgot (2014) (co-production with Walt Disney Pictures)

=== Disney Branded Television ===
- A Disney Halloween (1983)
- Circus (1983)
- The New Adventures of Davy Crockett (1988)
- A Conversation with Carol Starring Carol Burnett (1988)
- The Art of Disney Animation (1988)
- Manhattan Transfer: Going Home (1988)
- Christmas Candlelight Ceremony (1988)
- Judy Collins: Going Home (1989)
- The Making of Honey, I Shrunk the Kids (1989)
- Loretta and Crystal: Going Home (1989)
- The Making of Disney-MGM Studios Theme Park (1989)
- A Conversation with George Burns (1989)
- The Disney Channel Salutes The American Teacher (1989–1996)
- A Conversation with Betty White (1989)
- The Making of The Little Mermaid (1989)
- Disney's Young Peoples' Guide to Music: The Greatest Band in the Land (1990)
- Disney's Young Peoples' Guide to Music: A Tune for a Toon (1990)
- Carole King: Going Home (1990)
- The Disneyland Story (1990)
- Disney's American Teacher Awards (1990–2001)
- Disney's Rootin' Tootin' Roundup (1990)
- Goofy's Guide to Success (1990)
- The Party in Concert (1990)
- Sebastian's Caribbean Jamboree (1991)
- Disney's Coyote Tales (1991)
- Lifestyles of the Rich and Animated (1991)
- Sebastian's Party Gras (1991)
- Disney's Young Musicians Symphony Orchestra (1992–1999)
- Mickey's Nutcracker (1992)
- Party All Night Concert (1993)
- Children's Day Forum (1993)
- Backstage Pass: Disney's Beauty and the Beast Goes to Broadway (1994)
- The Making of Pocahontas: A Legend Comes to Life (1995)
- The Mickey Mouse Club Story (1995)
- Earth Day at Disney World (1996)
- The Making of The Hunchback of Notre Dame (1996)
- The Hunchback of Notre Dame: Festival of Fun Musical Spectacular (1996)
- The Making of Disney's 101 Dalmatians: The Magic is Real (1996)
- Zero to Hero: The Making of Hercules (1997) (co-production with Evolution Media)
- One Day (1998)
- It's A Trip (1998)
- The Making of Mulan (1998) (co-production with Evolution Media)
- The Making of Tarzan (1999) (co-production with Evolution Media)
- Learning for Life: Kids and Learning Differences (2000)
- School's In (2001)
- Confident for Life: Kids and Body Image (2002)
- Studio DC: Almost Live (2008)
- The Wizards Return: Alex vs. Alex (2013)
- Radio Disney Music Awards (2013–2019)
- Disney Channel Celebrates Radio Disney's Family Birthday (2014)
- Disney Channel's Fa-La-La-Lidays Celebrates A Radio Disney Family Holiday (2015)
- Disney Hall of Villains (2019)
- Disney Holiday Magic Quest (2020–2021)
- Disney Princess Remix: An Ultimate Princess Celebration (2021)
- Descendants: The Royal Wedding (2021)

==== Streamboat Willie Productions ====
- A Celebration of the Music from Coco (2020)
- Harmonious Live! (2022)
- Best in Snow (2022)
- The Hip Hop Nutcracker (2022)
- Pentatonix: Around the World for the Holidays (2022)
- Encanto at the Hollywood Bowl (2022)
- The Lion King at the Hollywood Bowl (2025)

=== ABC Entertainment ===
Title	Airdate	Network	Notes
A Gala For The President at Ford's Theatre	April 9, 1998	ABC	
An American Celebration at Ford's Theatre	August 18, 2001	ABC	
An American Celebration at Ford's Theatre: The July 4th Special	July 4, 2006	ABC	
ExxonMobil Presents A Holiday Celebration at Ford's Theatre	December 19, 2007	ABC	
Stand Up To Cancer	September 5, 2008	ABC	
America Celebrates July 4th at Ford's Theatre	July 2, 2010	ABC	
A Very Gaga Thanksgiving	November 24, 2011	ABC	
Concert for the Queen: A Diamond Jubilee Celebration with Katie Couric	June 5, 2012	ABC	
Countdown to Niagara: The Greatest Megastunts of All Time	June 15, 2012	ABC	
Megastunts: Highwire Over Niagara Falls - Live!	June 15, 2012	ABC	
2013 Tournament of Roses Parade	January 1, 2013	ABC	
Family Dance Off	August 25, 2013	ABC	
The ABCs of Schoolhouse Rock	September 7, 2014	ABC	
Living Every Day: Luke Bryan	November 6, 2017	ABC	
Videos After Dark	March 12, 2019	ABC	co-production with Vin Di Bona Productions
This is Farrah Fawcett	May 23, 2019	ABC	
Dolly Parton: Here She Comes Again!	November 12, 2019	ABC	
AFV: America, This Is You!	December 8, 2019	ABC	co-production with Vin Di Bona Productions

==== ABC News ====
Title	Airdate	Network	Notes
Audition: Barbara Walters' Journey	May 7, 2008	ABC	
Barack Obama: The Barbara Walters Interview	November 26, 2008	ABC	
The Year with Katie Couric	December 15, 2011	ABC	
Back to the Beginning With Christiane Amanpour	December 21-28, 2012	ABC	
Scandal for Real: The Top 10 Political Scandals of the Century	November 12, 2013	ABC	
Thank You, America! With Robin Roberts	November 27, 2014	ABC	
Katrina: 10 Years After the Storm with Robin Roberts	August 23, 2015	ABC	
The President and the People: Race in America	July 14, 2016	ABC	
All Access Nashville: Celebrating the CMA Awards With Robin Roberts	October 31, 2016	ABC	
The Last Days of Michael Jackson	May 24, 2018	ABC	
Country Music's Biggest Stars: In the Spotlight with Robin Roberts	November 11, 2018	ABC	
Meghan's New Life: The Real Princess Diaries	November 22, 2018	ABC	
2018: In Memoriam	December 17, 2018	ABC	
The Last Days of John F. Kennedy Jr.	January 3, 2019	ABC	
The Lion King: Can You Feel The Love Tonight with Robin Roberts	July 16, 2019	ABC	
What Is Jeopardy!? Alex Trebek and America's Most Popular Quiz Show	January 2, 2020	ABC	
Our New Reality: A Diane Sawyer Special	2020	ABC	
America in Pain: What Comes Next?	2020	ABC	
Shark Attack: The Paige Winter Story with Robin Roberts	2020	ABC	
The Real Queens of Hip-Hop: The Women Who Changed the Game	2021	ABC	
Two Men at War	2022	ABC	
Attack on the Capitol: The Investigation	2022	ABC	
Queen Elizabeth II: The Legacy, The Life	2022	ABC	
Matthew Perry: The Diane Sawyer Interview	2022	ABC	
Michelle Obama: The Light We Carry - A Conversation With Robin Roberts	2022	ABC	

==== Lincoln Square Productions ====
- Elvis: Viva Las Vegas (2007)
- Un-Broke: What You Need To Know About Money (2009)
- 25 Years of Sexy: People Magazine's Sexiest Man Alive! (2010)
- Lady Gaga and the Muppets Holiday Spectacular (2013) (co-production with The Muppets Studio)
- Backstage with Disney on Broadway: Celebrating 20 Years (2014)
- Countdown to the Oscars: An Insider's Guide (2015)
- Countdown to the 2015 Billboard Music Awards (2015)
- Countdown to the Emmy Awards: Red Carpet Live (2016)
- The Making of Frozen: A Return to Arendelle (2016)
- Live From Hollywood: The After Party With Anthony Anderson (2017)
- The Last 100 Days of Diana (2017)
- I'm Coming Home (2018)

=== Freeform ===
- Hometown Hero (1991) (pilot special)
- What Every Parent Needs to Know About Entertainment Ratings (2001)

==== SoapNet ====
Title	Airdate	Network	Notes
Another World Reunion	September 30, 2003	SoapNet	
Back in Pine Valley: Greenlee, Angie and Jesse	January 15, 2008	SoapNet	

=== Disney Experiences ===
Title	Airdate	Network	Notes
We Wish You a Merry Walrus	December 17, 2014	Disney Channel	co-production with Factory
Club Penguin: Monster Beach Party	August 10, 2015	Disney Channel	co-production with Factory
Club Penguin: Halloween Panic!	October 25, 2015	Disney Channel	co-production with Factory

==== The Muppets Studio ====
Title	Airdate	Network	Notes
Hey, Cinderella!	March 16, 1969	CBC Television; ABC	produced by Muppets, Inc. and Robert Lawrence Productions
The Frog Prince	May 12, 1971	Hughes Television Network	produced by Henson Associates and Robert Lawrence Productions
The Muppet Musicians of Bremen	April 26, 1972	Hughes Television Network	produced by Henson Associates and Robert Lawrence Productions
The Muppets Valentine Show	January 30, 1974	ABC	produced by Henson Associates
The Muppet Show: Sex and Violence	March 19, 1975	ABC	produced by Henson Associates
The Muppets Go Hollywood	May 16, 1979	CBS	produced by Henson Associates and Marble Arch Productions
The Muppets Go to the Movies	May 20, 1981	ABC	produced by Henson Associates and Marble Arch Productions
Of Muppets and Men	1981	Syndication	
The Fantastic Miss Piggy Show	September 17, 1982	ABC	produced by Henson Associates
The Muppets: A Celebration of 30 Years	January 21, 1986	CBS	produced by Henson Associates
The Tale of the Bunny Picnic	March 26, 1986	HBO; BBC1	produced by Henson Associates
A Muppet Family Christmas	December 16, 1987	ABC	produced by Jim Henson Productions
Mr. Willowby's Christmas Tree	December 6, 1995	CBS	produced by Jim Henson Productions
The Muppets' Wizard of Oz	May 20, 2005	ABC	co-production with The Jim Henson Company, Fox Television Studios and Touchstone Television
A Muppets Christmas: Letters to Santa	December 17, 2008	NBC	
Muppets Haunted Mansion	October 8, 2021	Disney+	co-production with Soapbox Films

==== Disney Destinations ====
- Disney Parks Christmas Day Parade (1983–present)
- Disney Parks Presents: A Descendants Magical Holiday Celebration (2016)
- Disney Parks Presents: A Disney Channel Holiday Celebration (2017)
- Disney's Fairy Tale Weddings: Holiday Magic (2017)
- Decorating Disney: Holiday Magic (2017)
- Disney Parks Presents: The 25 Days of Christmas Holiday Party (2018)
- Disney's Fairy Tale Weddings: Holiday Magic 2 (2018)
- The Wonderful World of Disney: Magical Holiday Celebration (2019–present)

== See also ==
- 20th Television Animation
- ABC Signature
- Disney Television Animation
- DePatie–Freleng Enterprises
- Touchstone Television
- It's a Laugh Productions
- List of Disney television films
- List of Pixar television series
- Lists of Walt Disney Studios films
- List of programs broadcast by American Broadcasting Company
- List of programs broadcast by Disney Channel
- List of programs broadcast by Disney Junior
- List of programs broadcast by Disney XD
- List of programs broadcast by ESPN
- List of programs broadcast by Freeform
- List of programs broadcast by FX
- List of programs broadcast by FXX
- List of programs broadcast by National Geographic
- List of programs broadcast by Nat Geo Wild
- List of TV series produced by Walt Disney Studios
- DreamWorks Animation Television
