= List of TV series produced by Walt Disney Studios =

This is a list of TV series produced by The Walt Disney Company under its various in-house subsidiaries, that were not bought or acquired from elsewhere.

It includes: Walt Disney Productions and Disney Branded Television. Some of these shows were originally produced by Walt Disney during his lifetime, while others were based cartoons Walt originally produced.

== Live action television series ==
Title	Original run	Production company	Network
Walt Disney's Disneyland (1954–58); Walt Disney Presents (1958–61); Walt Disney's Wonderful World of Color (1961–69); Disney's Wonderful World (1979–81); Walt Disney (1981–83); The Disney Sunday Movie (1986–88); The Magical World of Disney (1988–90); The Wonderful World of Disney (1969–79, 1983–87, 1991–present)	1954–1983; 1986-present	Walt Disney Productions	ABC (1954–61, 1986–88, and 1997–present); NBC (1961–81 and 1988–91); CBS (1981–83, 1991–97)
The Mickey Mouse Club	1955–1959, 1977–1978, 1989–1994	Walt Disney Productions	ABC (1955–1959); Syndication (1977–1979); The Disney Channel (1989–1996)
Zorro	1957–1959	Walt Disney Productions	ABC
The Mouse Factory	1971–1973	Walt Disney Productions	Syndicated
Herbie, the Love Bug	1982	Walt Disney Productions	CBS
Small & Frye	1983	Walt Disney Productions	CBS
Gun Shy	1983	Walt Disney Productions	CBS
Zorro and Son	1983	Walt Disney Television	CBS
Welcome to Pooh Corner	1983–1985	Left Coast Television; Walt Disney Productions	The Disney Channel
You and Me Kid	1983–1986	Walt Disney Productions	The Disney Channel
Contraption	1983–1989	Walt Disney Television	The Disney Channel
Mousercise	1983–1986	Walt Disney Television	The Disney Channel
EPCOT Magazine	1984–1986	Walt Disney Television	The Disney Channel
Disney Family Album	1984–1986	Walt Disney Television	The Disney Channel
Dumbo's Circus	1985–1988	Left Coast Television; Walt Disney Television	The Disney Channel
Sidekicks	1986–1987	Motown Productions	The Disney Channel/ABC
Videopolis	1987–1989	Walt Disney Television	The Disney Channel
Teen Angel	1989		The Disney Channel
Brand New Life	1989–1990	NBC Productions	NBC
Little Mermaid Island	1990	Jim Henson Productions	
The 100 Lives of Black Jack Savage	1991	Stephen J. Cannell Productions	NBC
Dinosaurs	1991–1994	Michael Jacobs Productions; Jim Henson Productions; Walt Disney Television	ABC
The Torkelsons	1991–1992	Michael Jacobs Productions	NBC
Adventures in Wonderland	1992–1995	Betty Productions	Syndication
The Secret of Lost Creek	1992	Walt Disney Television	The Disney Channel
Bill Nye the Science Guy	1993–1998	KCTS Seattle; McKenna/Gottlieb Producers, Inc. Rabbit Ears Productions	syndication/PBS
Walt Disney World Inside Out	1994–1997		The Disney Channel
Sing Me a Story with Belle	1995–1997	Patrick Davidson Productions	Syndication
Flash Forward	1995–1997	Atlantis Films	The Disney Channel
Brotherly Love	1996–1997	Witt/Thomas Productions	The WB
Going Wild with Jeff Corwin	1996–1999	Popular Arts Entertainment	The Disney Channel
Smart Guy	1997–1999	de Passe Entertainment; Danny Kallis Productions	The WB
Honey, I Shrunk the Kids: The TV Show	1997–2000	Plymouth Productions; St. Clare Entertainment	Syndication
Disney Channel in Concert	1997–2001		Disney Channel
Omba Mokomba	1997–1999	Popular Arts Entertainment	Disney Channel
Out of the Box	1998–2004	OOTB, Inc.	Disney Channel
2 Hour Tour	1998–2000		Disney Channel
Bug Juice	1998–2001	Evolution Film & Tape	Disney Channel
Off the Wall	1998–1999	Media Arts Entertainment; Vin Di Bona Productions	Disney Channel
Mad Libs	1998–1999	Slam Dunk Productions; Dick Clark Productions	Disney Channel
The Famous Jett Jackson	1998–2001 (Note: Currently owned by WildBrain.)	Alliance Atlantis; Every Kids is JP Kids	Disney Channel
So Weird	1999–2001	Sugar Entertainment, Ltd. (seasons 1–2); No Equal Entertainment, Inc. (season 3); Fair Dinkum Productions	Disney Channel
The Jersey	1999–2004	Lynch Entertainment	Disney Channel
Even Stevens	2000–2003	Brookwell McNamara Entertainment	Disney Channel
In a Heartbeat	2000–2001	AAC Kids	Disney Channel
Totally Circus	2000	Buena Vista Television	Disney Channel
Lizzie McGuire	2001–2004	Stan Rogow Productions	Disney Channel
Totally Hoops	2001	Evolution Films	Disney Channel
The Book of Pooh	2001–2004	Shadow Projects	Playhouse Disney
Zapping Zone	2001–2012	The Walt Disney Company Latin America	Disney Channel
Totally in Tune	2002	Evolution Film & Tape	Disney Channel
That's So Raven	2003–2007	Brookwell McNamara Entertainment (2003–06); That's So Productions (2006–07); Warren & Rinsler Productions (2006–07)	Disney Channel
Phil of the Future	2004–2006	2929 Productions	Disney Channel
The Eyes of Nye	2005	(distribution only: produced by KCTS-TV)	PBS
Breakfast with Bear	2005	Shadow Projects; Jim Henson Television	Playhouse Disney
Johnny and the Sprites	2005–2009	Happy Puppet Productions (seasons 1–2); Homegirl Productions (season 1)	Playhouse Disney
The Suite Life of Zack & Cody	2005–2008	It's a Laugh Productions	Disney Channel
Hannah Montana	2006–2011	It's a Laugh Productions; Michael Poryes Productions	Disney Channel
Cory in the House	2007–2008	It's a Laugh Productions; Warren & Rinsler Productions	Disney Channel
Wizards of Waverly Place	2007–2012	It's a Laugh Productions	Disney Channel
Bunnytown	2007–2009	Baker Coogan Productions; Spiffy Pictures	Playhouse Disney
The Suite Life on Deck	2008–2011	It's a Laugh Productions; Danny Kallis Productions (seasons 1–2); Bon Mot Productions (season 3)	Disney Channel
Imagination Movers	2008–2013	Penn/Bright Entertainment; Zydeco Productions	Playhouse Disney
Sonny with a Chance	2009–2011	Varsity Pictures; It's a Laugh Productions	Disney Channel
Aaron Stone	2009–2010	Shaftesbury Films; Three Hearts Productions	Disney XD
Jonas	2009–2010	Mantis Productions (season 1); Turtle Rock Productions; It's a Laugh Productions	Disney Channel
Zeke and Luther	2009–2012	Turtle Rock Productions	Disney XD
I'm in the Band	2009–2011	It's a Laugh Productions	Disney XD
Good Luck Charlie	2010–2014	It's a Laugh Productions	Disney Channel
Shake It Up	2010–2013	It's a Laugh Productions	Disney Channel
Pair of Kings	2010–2013	It's a Laugh Productions	Disney XD
A.N.T. Farm	2011–2014	Gravy Boat Productions; It's a Laugh Productions	Disney Channel
So Random!	2011–2012	Varsity Pictures; It's a Laugh Productions	Disney Channel
Kickin' It	2011–2015	Poor Soul Productions; It's a Laugh Productions	Disney XD
Jessie	2011–2015	Bon Mot Productions; It's a Laugh Productions	Disney Channel
Austin & Ally	2011–2016	Kevin & Heath Productions; It's a Laugh Productions	Disney Channel
PrankStars	2011	Zoo Productions	Disney Channel
Lab Rats	2012–2016	It's a Laugh Productions	Disney XD
Violetta	2012–2015	Pol-ka	Disney Channel (Latin American)
The U-Mix Show	2012–2014	The Walt Disney Company Latin America	Disney Channel (Latin American)
Code: 9	2012	Evolution Media	Disney Channel
Crash & Bernstein	2012–2014	It's a Laugh Productions	Disney XD
Dog with a Blog	2012–2015	Diphthong Productions; It's a Laugh Productions	Disney Channel
Liv and Maddie	2013–2017	Beck & Hart Productions; Oops Doughnuts Productions; It's a Laugh Productions	Disney Channel
Mighty Med	2013–2015	It's a Laugh Productions	Disney XD
I Didn't Do It	2014–2015	That's Not So Funny Productions; It's a Laugh Productions	Disney Channel
Win, Lose or Draw	2014	Entertain the Brutes	Disney Channel
Girl Meets World	2014–2017	Michael Jacobs Productions; It's a Laugh Productions	Disney Channel
The Evermoor Chronicles	2014–2017	Lime Pictures; All3Media	Disney Channel (British and Irish)
Kirby Buckets	2014–2017	Horizon Productions; Titmouse, Inc.	Disney XD
K.C. Undercover	2015–2018	Rob Lotterstein Productions; It's a Laugh Productions	Disney Channel
Best Friends Whenever	2015–2016	Diphthong Productions; Entertainment Force; It's a Laugh Productions	Disney Channel
Gamer's Guide to Pretty Much Everything	2015–2017	Poor Soul Productions; 37 Monkeys; It's a Laugh Productions	Disney XD
Bunk'd	2015–present	Bon Mot Productions (seasons 1–3); That's Not So Funny Productions (season 4); A Little Too You Productions; It's a Laugh Productions	Disney Channel
Lab Rats: Elite Force	2016	Britelite Productions; It's a Laugh Productions	Disney XD
Stuck in the Middle	2016–2018	International Donut Fund Productions; Horizon Productions	Disney Channel
Walk the Prank	2016–2018	Blackbird Films; Sullen Child; Horizon Productions	Disney XD
Bizaardvark	2016–2019	It's a Laugh Productions	Disney Channel
The Lodge	2016–2017	Zodiak Kids Studios	Disney Channel (British and Irish)
Mech-X4	2016–2018	Marmel Dynamics; Omnifilm Entertainment	Disney XD
Andi Mack	2017–2019	Go Dog Go; MM Productions; Horizon Productions	Disney Channel
Raven's Home	2017–present	It's a Laugh Productions; Entertainment Force (season 1); November 13; Done Deal Productions (season 2); Funny Boone Productions (mid-season 3); Institute for Individual Education (season 3–4)	Disney Channel
Bug Juice: My Adventures at Camp	2018	Evolution Media	Disney Channel
Coop & Cami Ask the World	2018–2020	Bugliari/McLaughlin Production; It's a Laugh Productions	Disney Channel
Sydney to the Max	2019–2021	It's a Laugh Productions; Mark Reisman Productions	Disney Channel
Fast Layne	2019	Lakeshore Productions; Omnifilm Entertainment	Disney Channel
Just Roll with It	2019–2021	Blackbird Films; Sullen Child; Kenwood TV Productions	Disney Channel
Gabby Duran & the Unsittables	2019–2021	Omnifilm Entertainment; Two Gorgeous Gentleman	Disney Channel
High School Musical: The Musical: The Series	2019–2023	Salty Pictures / Disney Channel	Disney+
The Imagineering Story	2019	Iwerks & Co.	Disney+
Disney Fam Jam	2020	Matador Content	Disney Channel
The Big Fib	2020	Haymaker TV	Disney+
Earth to Ned	2020–2021	The Jim Henson Company; Marwar Junction Productions	Disney+
Secrets of Sulphur Springs	2021–present	Gwave Productions	Disney Channel
Behind the Attraction	2021–present	Seven Bucks Productions; The Nacelle Company	Disney+
Beyond the Stars	2021	Fulwell 73 Productions; Olive Bridge Entertainment	Disney+
Intertwined	2021–present	Pampa Films; Gloriamundi Productions	Disney+
The Beatles: Get Back	2021	Walt Disney Pictures; Apple Corps; Wingnut Films	Disney+

== Animated series ==
Title	Original run	Production company	Network
Walt Disney's Disneyland (1954–58); Walt Disney Presents (1958–61); Walt Disney's Wonderful World of Color (1961–69); Disney's Wonderful World (1979–81); Walt Disney (1981–83); The Disney Sunday Movie (1986–88); The Magical World of Disney (1988–90); The Wonderful World of Disney (1969–79, 1983–87, 1991–present)	1954–1983, 1986-present	Walt Disney Productions	ABC (1954–61, 1986–88, and 1997–present); NBC (1961–81 and 1988–91); CBS (1981–83, 1991–97)
The Mickey Mouse Club	1955–1959, 1977–1978, 1989–1994	Walt Disney Productions	ABC (1955–1959); Syndication (1977–1979); The Disney Channel (1989–1996)
The Mouse Factory	1971–1973	Walt Disney Productions	Syndicated
Good Morning, Mickey!	1983–1986	Walt Disney Television	The Disney Channel
Donald Duck Presents	1983–1992	Walt Disney Television	The Disney Channel
The Wuzzles	1985	Walt Disney Pictures Television Animation Group	CBS
Disney Sing-Along Songs	1986–2006	Walt Disney Home Entertainment	Direct-to-video
Disney's Adventures of the Gummi Bears	1985–1991	Walt Disney Television Animation	NBC; ABC; Syndication
DuckTales	1987–1990	Walt Disney Television Animation	Syndication
The New Adventures of Winnie the Pooh	1988–1991	Walt Disney Television Animation	ABC
Chip 'n Dale: Rescue Rangers	1989–1990	Walt Disney Television Animation	Syndication
TaleSpin	1990–1991	Walt Disney Television Animation	Syndication
Darkwing Duck	1991–1992	Walt Disney Television Animation	ABC; Syndication
Goof Troop	1992–1993	Walt Disney Television Animation	ABC; Syndication
The Little Mermaid	1992–1994	Walt Disney Television Animation	CBS
Raw Toonage	1992	Walt Disney Television Animation	CBS
Bonkers	1993–1994	Walt Disney Television Animation	Syndication
Marsupilami	1993	Walt Disney Television Animation	CBS
Aladdin	1994–1995	Walt Disney Television Animation	CBS; Syndication
Gargoyles	1994–1997	Walt Disney Television Animation	Syndication; ABC
The Shnookums and Meat Funny Cartoon Show	1995	Walt Disney Television Animation	Syndication
Timon & Pumbaa	1995–1999	Walt Disney Television Animation	CBS; Syndication; Toon Disney
Quack Pack	1996	Walt Disney Television Animation	Syndication
Mighty Ducks: The Animated Series	1996–1997	Walt Disney Television Animation	Syndication; ABC
Jungle Cubs	1996–1998	Walt Disney Television Animation	ABC
Doug	1996–1999	Jumbo Pictures; Walt Disney Television Animation	ABC
Nightmare Ned	1997	Walt Disney Television Animation; Creative Capers Entertainment	ABC
101 Dalmatians	1997–1998	Walt Disney Television Animation; Jumbo Pictures	ABC; Syndication
Recess	1997–2001	Walt Disney Television Animation	ABC
Pepper Ann	1997–2000	Walt Disney Television Animation	ABC
Hercules	1998–1999	Walt Disney Television Animation	ABC; Syndication
PB&J Otter	1998–2000	Jumbo Pictures; Walt Disney Television Animation	Playhouse Disney
Rolie Polie Olie	1998–2004	Nelvana; Sparx Animation Studios	Playhouse Disney
The PJs	1999–2001	Imagine Television; Touchstone Television (seasons 1–2); The Murphy Company; Will Vinton Studios; Warner Bros. Television (season 3)	Fox (seasons 1–2); The WB (season 3)
Mickey Mouse Works	1999–2000	Walt Disney Television Animation	ABC
The Weekenders	2000–2004	Walt Disney Television Animation	ABC; Toon Disney
Teacher's Pet	2000–2002	Walt Disney Television Animation	ABC; Toon Disney
Clerks: The Animated Series	2000–2002	Miramax Television; View Askew Productions; Woltz International Pictures Corporation; Touchstone Television; Walt Disney Television Animation (uncredited)	Comedy Central; ABC (Episode 2, 4)
Buzz Lightyear of Star Command	2000–2001	Walt Disney Television Animation; Pixar Animation Studios	UPN; ABC
House of Mouse	2001–2003	Walt Disney Television Animation	ABC; Toon Disney
Lloyd in Space	2001–2004	Walt Disney Television Animation	ABC; Toon Disney
The Legend of Tarzan	2001–2003	Walt Disney Television Animation	UPN
The Proud Family	2001–2005	Jambalaya Studios	Disney Channel
Stanley	2001–2004	Cartoon Pizza	Playhouse Disney
Teamo Supremo	2002–2004	Walt Disney Television Animation	ABC; Toon Disney
Kim Possible	2002–2007	Walt Disney Television Animation	Disney Channel
Fillmore!	2002–2004	Walt Disney Television Animation	ABC; Toon Disney
Lilo & Stitch: The Series	2003–2006	Walt Disney Television Animation	Disney Channel
JoJo's Circus	2003–2007	Cartoon Pizza; Cuppa Coffee Studios	Playhouse Disney
Dave the Barbarian	2004–2005	Walt Disney Television Animation	Disney Channel
Shanna's Show	2004	Walt Disney Television Animation; Unbound Studios	Playhouse Disney (interstitial series)
Brandy & Mr. Whiskers	2004–2006	Walt Disney Television Animation	Disney Channel
The Tofus	2004–2005	SIP Animation; CinéGroupe	
Higglytown Heroes	2004–2008	Wild Brain; Happy Nest	Playhouse Disney
Super Robot Monkey Team Hyperforce Go!	2004–2006	Jetix Animation Concepts	Jetix
W.I.T.C.H.	2004–2006	SIP Animation	Jetix
American Dragon: Jake Long	2005–2007	Walt Disney Television Animation	Disney Channel
The Buzz on Maggie	2005–2006	Walt Disney Television Animation	Disney Channel
Little Einsteins	2005–2009	Curious Pictures; The Baby Einstein Company	Playhouse Disney
Get Ed	2005–2006	Jetix Animation Concepts	Jetix
Yin Yang Yo!	2006–2009	Jetix Animation Concepts	Jetix
The Replacements	2006–2009	Walt Disney Television Animation	Disney Channel
Shorty McShorts' Shorts	2006–2009	Walt Disney Television Animation	Disney Channel (interstitial series)
The Emperor's New School	2006–2008	Walt Disney Television Animation	Disney Channel
Mickey Mouse Clubhouse	2006–2016	Disney Television Animation	Playhouse Disney
Handy Manny	2006–2013	Nelvana	Playhouse Disney
My Friends Tigger & Pooh	2007–2010	Walt Disney Television Animation	Playhouse Disney
Happy Monster Band	2007–2008	Kickstart Productions	Playhouse Disney (interstitial series)
Cars Toons	2008–2013	Walt Disney Pictures; Pixar Animation Studios	Disney Channel
Stitch!	2008–2011	Madhouse; Shin-Ei Animation	TV Tokyo; TV Asahi; Disney Channel (Japan)
Special Agent Oso	2009–2012	Disney Television Animation	Disney Junior
Jungle Junction	2009–2012	Spider Eye Productions	Disney Junior
Fish Hooks	2010–2014	Disney Television Animation	Disney Channel
Kick Buttowski: Suburban Daredevil	2010–2013	Disney Television Animation	Disney XD
Take Two with Phineas and Ferb	2010–2011	Walt Disney Television Animation; Hieroglyphic Productions; Studio B Productions	Disney Channel (interstitial series)
Mickey Mousekersize	2011	Disney Television Animation	Disney Junior (interstitial series)
Minnie's Bow-Toons	2011–2016	Disney Television Animation	Disney Junior (interstitial series)
Jake and the Never Land Pirates	2011–2016	Disney Television Animation	Disney Junior
Special Agent Oso: Three Healthy Steps	2011–2013	Disney Television Animation	Disney Junior (interstitial series)
A Poem Is...	2011–2013	Disney Channels Worldwide	Disney Junior (interstitial series)
Toy Story Toons	2011–2012	Walt Disney Pictures; Pixar Animation Studios	Disney Junior (interstitial series)
Motorcity	2012–2013	Disney Television Animation; Titmouse, Inc.	Disney XD
Doc McStuffins	2012–2020	Brown Bag Films	Disney Junior
Tron: Uprising	2012–2013	Disney Television Animation; Sean Bailey Productions	Disney XD
Randy Cunningham: 9th Grade Ninja	2012–2015	Titmouse, Inc. Boulder Media Limited	Disney XD
Gravity Falls	2012–2016	Disney Television Animation	Disney Channel; Disney XD
Henry Hugglemonster	2013–2016	Brown Bag Films	Disney Junior
Wander Over Yonder	2013–2016	Disney Television Animation	Disney Channel; Disney XD
Sofia the First	2013–2018	Disney Television Animation	Disney Junior
Mickey Mouse	2013–2019	Disney Television Animation	Disney Channel
Sheriff Callie's Wild West	2014–2016	WildBrain (season 1); Wild Canary Animation (season 2)	Disney Junior
The 7D	2014–2016	Disney Television Animation	Disney XD
Penn Zero: Part-Time Hero	2014–2017	Disney Television Animation	Disney XD
Two More Eggs	2015–2017	Disney Television Animation; Citywide Hoop Champs, Inc.	Disney XD
Descendants: Wicked World	2015–2017	Disney Television Animation	Disney Channel
Star Darlings	2015–2016		Disney Channel
Miles from Tomorrowland	2015–2018	Wild Canary Animation	Disney Junior
Pickle and Peanut	2015–2018	Disney Television Animation	Disney XD
Goldie & Bear	2015–2018	Milk Barn Entertainment (season 1); Titmouse, Inc. (season 2)	Disney Junior
Star vs. the Forces of Evil	2015–2019	Disney Television Animation	Disney XD; Disney Channel
The Lion Guard	2015–2019	Disney Television Animation	Disney Junior
Elena of Avalor	2016–2020	Disney Television Animation	Disney Channel; Disney Junior
Future-Worm!	2016–2018	Disney Television Animation	Disney XD
Milo Murphy's Law	2016-2019	Disney Television Animation	Disney XD; Disney Channel
Rapunzel's Tangled Adventure	2017–2020	Disney Television Animation	Disney Channel
Stitch & Ai	2017	Anhui Xinhua Media/Panimation Hwakai Media	CCTV-1
Billy Dilley's Super-Duper Subterranean Summer	2017	Disney Television Animation	Disney XD
DuckTales (2017)	2017–2021	Disney Television Animation	Disney XD; Disney Channel
Vampirina	2017–2021	Brown Bag Films	Disney Junior
Mickey Mouse Mixed-Up Adventures	2017–2021	Disney Television Animation	Disney Junior
Big Hero 6: The Series	2017–2021	Disney Television Animation	Disney XD; Disney Channel
Puppy Dog Pals	2017 - 2023	Wild Canary Animation	Disney Junior
Legend of the Three Caballeros	2018	Disney Interactive; 6 Point Harness	DisneyLife
Space Chickens in Space	2018-2019	Ánima Estudios; Studio Moshi; Gingerbread Animation; Disney EMEA	9Go! (Australia); Disney XD (international); Disney Channel (United States)
101 Dalmatian Street	2019–2020	Passion Animation Studios; Atomic Cartoons	Disney Channel; Disney+
The Rocketeer	2019–2020	Wild Canary Animation	Disney Junior
Forky Asks a Question	2019	Pixar Animation Studios	Disney+
Best Bugs Forever	2019	Je Suis Bien Content; Disney EMEA; Watch Next Media	Disney Channel Europe
Muppet Babies	2018–2022	The Muppets Studio	Disney Junior
Fancy Nancy	2018–2022	Disney Television Animation	Disney Junior
T.O.T.S.	2019–2022	Titmouse, Inc.	Disney Junior
Amphibia	2019–2022	Disney Television Animation	Disney Channel
Mira, Royal Detective	2020-2022	Wild Canary Animation	Disney Junior
The Owl House	2020 - 2023	Disney Television Animation	Disney Channel
The Wonderful World of Mickey Mouse	2020 - 2023	Disney Television Animation	Disney+
The Chicken Squad	2021-2022	Wild Canary Animation	Disney Junior
Dug Days	2021-2023	Pixar Animation Studios	Disney+
Monsters at Work	2021–2024	Disney Television Animation	Disney+
Chip 'n' Dale: Park Life	2021–2024	Xilam Animation; The Walt Disney Company France	Disney+
The Ghost and Molly McGee	2021–2024	Disney Television Animation	Disney Channel; Disney+
Mickey Mouse Funhouse	2021–2025	Disney Television Animation	Disney Junior
Alice's Wonderland Bakery	2022–2024	Disney Television Animation	Disney Junior
Eureka!	2022–2023	Brown Bag Films	Disney Junior
Baymax!	2022	Walt Disney Animation Studios	Disney+
Cars on the Road	2022	Pixar Animation Studios	Disney+
Zootopia+	2022	Walt Disney Animation Studios	Disney+
Vikingskool	2022	Cartoon Saloon	Disney Channel
Firebuds	2022–2025	Electric Emu Productions; Disney Television Animation	Disney Junior
Hailey's On It!	2023–2024	Disney Television Animation	Disney Channel
Moon Girl and Devil Dinosaur	2023–2025	Cinema Gyspy Productions; Disney Television Animation	Disney Channel
Star Wars: Young Jedi Adventures	2023–2025	Lucasfilm; Lucasfilm Animation; Wild Canary Animation	Disney Junior
Iwájú	2024	Walt Disney Animation Studios; Kugali	Disney+
Primos	2024–2025	Disney Television Animation	Disney Channel
Kindergarten: The Musical	2024–2025	Wild Canary Animation	Disney Junior
StuGo	2025	Disney Television Animation; Titmouse, Inc.	Disney Channel
Win or Lose	2025	Pixar Animation Studios	Disney+
Ongoing
Phineas and Ferb	2007–2015, 2025–present	Disney Television Animation	Disney Channel; Disney XD
Big City Greens	2018–present	Disney Television Animation	Disney Channel
Spidey and His Amazing Friends	2021–present	Marvel Animation; Atomic Cartoons	Disney Junior
The Proud Family: Louder and Prouder	2022–present	Disney Television Animation; Bar Productions	Disney+
Hamster & Gretel	2022–present	Disney Television Animation	Disney Channel
SuperKitties	2023–present	Sony Pictures Television Kids	Disney Junior
Kiff	2023–present	Titmouse, Inc. Disney Television Animation	Disney Channel
Pupstruction	2023–present	Titmouse, Inc.	Disney Junior
X-Men '97	2024–present	Marvel Animation	Disney+
Ariel	2024–present	Wild Canary Animation	Disney Junior
RoboGobo	2025–present	Disney Television Animation; Brown Bag Films	Disney Junior
Mickey Mouse Clubhouse+	2025–present	Disney Television Animation	Disney Junior
Upcoming
The Doomies	2026	Xilam Animation; Disney EMEA Animation Studio	Disney+ Disney Channel
Dragon Striker	2026	Cyber Group Studios; La Chouette Compagnie; Disney EMEA Animation Studio	Disney+ Disney Channel

== Programming blocks ==
- The Disney Afternoon (1990–1997)
- Disney's One Saturday Morning (1997–2002; exclusively for ABC stations)
- Disney's One Too (1999–2003; exclusively for UPN stations)

== See also ==
- List of Disney television series
