= Emily Gimmel =

American journalist and television personality

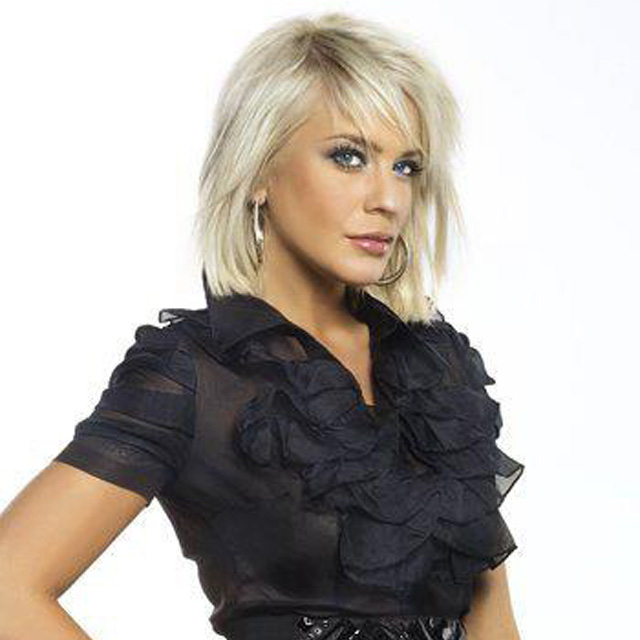
- Emily Gimmel
- Born: May 17, 1984 (age 42); Louisville, Kentucky, United States
- Education: University of Kentucky
- Occupations: Businesswoman, TV personality
- Website: Official website

Emily Gimmel (born May 17, 1984) is an American journalist, entrepreneur, businesswoman, and television personality.

== Biography ==
=== Family ===
Emily Gimmel's great-grandfather, Robert Gimmel, started Atlas Machine and Supply, Inc. in 1907; a company selling and repairing industrial equipment. Her father Rich now runs the multimillion-dollar company that has expanded to seven locations with over 200 employees.

=== High school ===
Gimmel grew up in Louisville, Kentucky. She first learned about television broadcasting at her high school, Sacred Heart Academy. At age 15, Gimmel started as an intern at WDRB-TV. At seventeen, she began contributing reports on teen issues to WAVE-TV. Simultaneously, she began hosting a daily radio show for 98.9 KISS FM. During her senior year of high school, she became the state's first CNN Student News Bureau certified reporter.

=== University ===
Upon graduation, Emily attended the University of Kentucky, majoring in broadcast journalism. Two weeks before she started her first Freshman class, she was hired as the daily morning features reporter for WKYT-TV, the CBS affiliate in Lexington, Kentucky. She also hosted a weekly music show called Louisville Live, was a weekend pit reporter for The Speed Channel, and hosted a weekly radio show on HOT 102.5 in Lexington. After college and working at WKYT, Emily moved to Indianapolis to work as an entertainment reporter for ABC affiliate WRTV Channel 6. Her work consisted of Hollywood interviews, covering the Indy 500, Indianapolis Colts, and lifestyle stories in the Hoosier State. She also contributed to the Big Ten Network and The Indianapolis Star.

=== Career ===
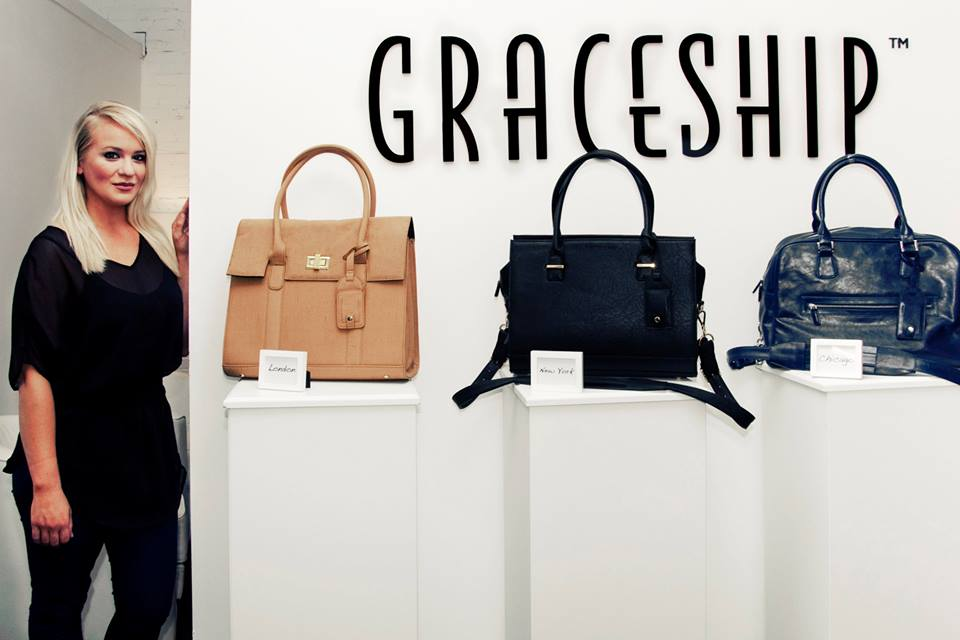
Emily Gimmel with her collection of bags

Emily is the fourth generation successor to her family company Atlas Machine and Supply, Inc., along with her brother Richie. In 2011, she founded the Louisville-based company Graceship which sells women's laptop bags online. The bags are eco-friendly and come in three styles; London, New York City and Chicago, all representing the style of the city they are named after. Each bag can hold up to a 15.4" laptop or tablet. The bags were all designed from scratch by Emily herself.

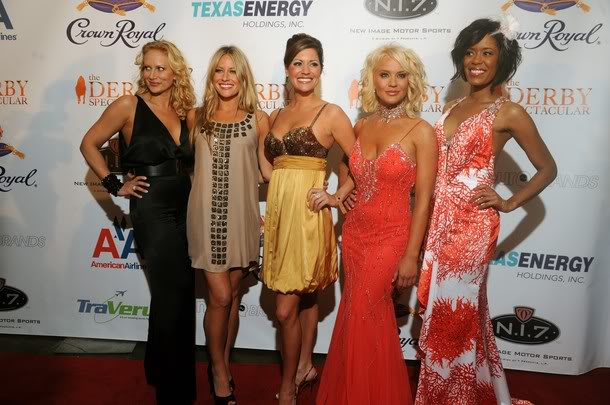
Emily Gimmel with her cast in Southern Belles: Louisville

In 2008, she went to Las Vegas to cover the World Series of Poker and produce video features for the global gaming network, PokerNews. After the series, Greenspun Media Group announced Emily as a host, editor, and producer for its new multimedia broadband TV show, 702.tv.

Gimmel was the youngest cast member on the TV docudrama Southern Belles: Louisville, which ran from May 21 – July 29, 2009. In 2011, she complained about photos posted on Is Anyone Up? that she claimed wasn't her. In June 2014, she joined the board of directors of the Kentucky-based mental health center Seven Counties Services.

== Awards ==
- 2006: Named one of Lexington's most eligible bachelorettes.
- 2009: Named one of the "Top 30 Under 30" most influential young professionals in Las Vegas award list.
