= P.A.O.K. women's basketball =

PAOK
- Nickname: Two-headed eagle of the North
- Leagues: Greek Championship; Greek Cup
- Founded: 1967
- Arena: P.A.O.K. Sports Arena
- Capacity: 8,142
- Location: Thessaloniki, Greece
- Team colors: Black and White
- President: (Greece) Athanasios Katsaris
- Head coach: (Greece) Aggelos Aggelidis
- Website: acpaok.gr
| Home | Away |

P.A.O.K. Women's Basketball is part of the amateur section of the major Greek multi-sport club P.A.O.K. The club is based in Thessaloniki, Greece. The department was founded in 1967. P.A.O.K. Sports Arena is the home arena of the team.

== Roster ==
Note: Flags indicate national team eligibility at FIBA-sanctioned events. Players may hold other non-FIBA nationalities not displayed.

PAOK women's basketball roster
Players
Coaches

| Pos. | No. | Nat. | Name | Ht. | Wt. | Age |
|---|---|---|---|---|---|---|
| PF | 4 | (United States) | Petree, Lasha | 1.83 m (6 ft 0 in) | | 25 – 9 April 2000 |
| F | 7 | (Greece) | Giannoudi, Athnina | 1.80 m (5 ft 11 in) | | 28 – 7 March 1997 |
| SG | 9 | (Greece) | Prapa, Ismini | 1.74 m (5 ft 9 in) | | 25 – 15 May 2000 |
| C | 10 | (Greece) | Koumantsiotou, Eva | 1.90 m (6 ft 3 in) | | 21 – 9 June 2004 |
| SG | 11 | (Greece) | Zormpala, Apostolia | 1.78 m (5 ft 10 in) | | 17 – 1 July 2008 |
| PF | 12 | (Cyprus) | Savva, Mikaela | 1.82 m (6 ft 0 in) | | 19 – 10 February 2006 |
| C | 13 | (Greece) | Togia, Nikolitsa | 1.90 m (6 ft 3 in) | | 19 – 12 January 2006 |
| PG | 14 | (Vietnam) | Truong, Kaylynne | 1.74 m (5 ft 9 in) | | 24 – 10 July 2001 |
| PF | 15 | (Greece) | Mylonaki, Varvara | 1.84 m (6 ft 0 in) | | 26 – 10 March 1999 |
| PG | 16 | (Greece) | Michailidou, Elena | 1.80 m (5 ft 11 in) | | 20 – 14 December 2004 |
| F | 17 | (Greece) | Michailidou, Kalliopi | 1.82 m (6 ft 0 in) | | 20 – 14 December 2004 |
| SF | 18 | (Greece) | Psarra, Markela | 1.80 m (5 ft 11 in) | | 18 – 8 June 2007 |
| SG | 22 | (Greece) | Stamataki, Sofia | 1.80 m (5 ft 11 in) | | 19 – 7 October 2005 |
| C | 42 | (United States) | Hobby, Camille | 1.92 m (6 ft 4 in) | | 24 – 4 January 2001 |
| SG | 43 | (Greece) | Sofia, Stampoulidou | 1.75 m (5 ft 9 in) | | 16 – 31 May 2009 |

Head coach

- (Greece) Angelos Angelides

Assistant coach(es)

Dimitris Drakatos

Athletic trainer(s)

- (Greece) Aristides Tarpagos

Legend

- (C) Team captain
- Injured

=== Technical and managerial staff ===
Staff
| President | (Greece) Athanasios Katsaris |
| Registrar women's basketball | (Greece) Vasillis Αngelidis |
| Head Coach | (Greece) Angelos Angelidis |
| Assistant Coach | (Greece) Dimitris Drakatos |
| Assistant Coach | (Greece) Nikos Papadopoulos |
| Technical Advisor | (Greece) Evripides Meletiadis |
| Trainer | (Greece) Aristides Tarpagos |
| Physiotherapist | (Greece) Dimitris Karageorgiou |
| Physiotherapist | (Greece) Eva Katsikari |
| Physiotherapist | (Greece) Giannis Kalogiannis |
| Youth Coach | (Greece) Nikos Papadopoulos |

== Notable players ==
Completed list of former PAOK Women players by Eurobasket.com

- (Greece) Maria Avtzi
- (Greece) Nafsika Stavridou
- (Greece) Faidra Skiadopoulou
- (Greece) Elena Kyratzi
- (Greece) Telidou Dimitra
- (Greece) Kalampakou Aspasia
- (Greece) Spanidou Stavroula
- (Greece) Anna Niki Stamolamprou
- (Greece) Tarpagou Anthoula
- (Serbia) Ivana Raca
- (Serbia) Tijana Raca
- (United States) (Greece) Niky Avery
- (United States) Caila Desroches
- (United States) Aisha Jefferson
- (United States) Kenya McBee
- (United States) Clemons, Liza
- (United States) Redmon, Jazmine

== See also ==
- P.A.O.K. BC
