= Stephanie Trong =

American editor (born 1976)

- Born: 1976 (age 49–50); Norwich, New York, US
- Education: University of Texas at Austin (BA)
- Occupation: Editor

Stephanie Trong (born 1976 in Norwich, New York) is an American editor who was the executive editor of the magazine Jane, which had a circulation approaching one million until it shut down in July 2007.

== Biography ==
She was born in Norwich, New York in 1976, the daughter of a Vietnamese American engineering executive and his wife, an American woman of European descent from New Jersey. While still a child, Stephanie moved from New York State to Texas with her parents. She later graduated from the University of Texas at Austin with a bachelor's degree in journalism in 1998.

She joined Jane magazine in early 1999 as an editorial assistant and was later promoted to assistant editor, associate editor, senior editor, deputy editor and finally executive editor. She was second only to Brandon Holley, the editor-in-chief of the magazine. After a stint at Page Six The Magazine, Trong joined Nylon Magazine in August 2008 as executive editor for both its Nylon and Nylon Guys publications.

On April 21, 2010; it was announced by NBC New York that Stephanie Trong would soon join the rapidly expanding Gilt Groupe as its first editorial director. On October 14, 2010, the New York Observer published an article by Zeke Turner, revealing: "In other moves at Lucky [Magazine]...Ms. Holley has also hired Stephanie Trong, her number two from the Jane years, as deputy editor."

Stephanie also appeared on the SOAPnet series The Fashionista Diaries.
