= Deborah Blackwell =

Deborah Blackwell (June 15, 1950 – January 31, 2014) was an American television network executive who was primarily responsible for the rise of soap opera centric cable network, SOAPnet, having joined as general manager in 2001.

With Blackwell as general manager, the channel grew in distribution to more than 67 million homes and secured rights from NBC and CBS (in addition to owner ABC) to run same-day daytime soap opera episodes. During Blackwell's time as the head of SOAPnet, the channel acquired primetime shows such as One Tree Hill and The O.C. These joined earlier acquisitions Melrose Place, Beverly Hills, 90210 and Dallas. SoapNet also extended its stable of original programming, including developing its first scripted show, a spinoff of General Hospital: Night Shift, and reality series The Fashionista Diaries.

Blackwell left SOAPnet in October 2007. Brian Frons succeeded her in overseeing operations.

Blackwell died in Virginia at the age of 63 on January 31, 2014. For seven years, she suffered from Pick's disease, a rare neurodegenerative disease.
