= Jane (magazine) =

American women's magazine

- Lindsay Lohan on the January 2005 cover
- Editor-in-Chief: Brandon Holley
- Categories: Fashion magazine
- Frequency: Monthly
- First issue: September 1997
- Final issue: August 2007
- Company: Condé Nast Publications
- Country: United States
- Language: English
- ISSN: 1093-8737

Jane was an American magazine created to appeal to the women who grew up reading Sassy magazine; Jane Pratt was the founding editor of each. It was published monthly from September 1997 to August 2007. Its original target audience (as pitched to advertisers) was aged 18–34, and was designed to appeal to women who did not like the typical women's magazine format. Pratt originally intended the magazine to be named Betty, but she was voted down by everyone else involved in making the magazine.

== History and profile ==
Jane was launched in September 1997; the final issue was dated August 2007. The events surrounding the magazine's folding were chronicled through the experiences of two assistants on the Soapnet series The Fashionista Diaries. The magazine was published on a monthly basis.

Sassy, created by Pratt in 1987, was intended to appeal to adolescent girls, but because of its sexual candor and coverage of topics other teen magazines did not touch, such as the riot grrrl movement, its popularity exploded beyond its intended audience. When Sassy ended its New York editorial run in 1994, readers were left heartbroken and waiting for something to take its place. In September 1997, Jane Pratt's new magazine, Jane, published by the Disney-owned Fairchild Publications, hit the stands with Drew Barrymore as its maiden cover girl. Fairchild Publications was purchased by Condé Nast Publications in 1999 and later sold to Penske Media in 2014.

On 25 July 2005, Pratt announced that she was resigning from her position as editor-in-chief of Jane and would be leaving the company on September 30, 2005, exactly eight years after the magazine's debut.

In August 2005, Brandon Holley, editor in chief of Elle Girl, was named to take Pratt's place. Stephanie Trong, who had been with the magazine since 1999, would remain as executive editor. Christina Kelly, managing editor of Elle Girl, as well as a rumored favorite to take over Jane because of her decades-long friendship with Jane Pratt, took over Elle Girl.

When Jane announced that it was ceasing publication, the magazine notified its readers that they would receive one of a number of sister magazines (Glamour, Allure or Lucky) for their remaining subscription durations. Glamour, Allure, and Lucky were all Condé Nast publications that were suffering from lower circulation. Subscribers who did not wish to receive these publications in lieu of the cancelled magazine could call Condé Nast and request any of the other magazines that they published, including the popular Vanity Fair.

The magazine appeared to be on a winning streak; however, the young target audience had moved on to digital and left print behind. Jane had the youngest average reader age of the women's magazines, and the demise of Jane was seen by some as a sign of what was to come to the other women's magazines. The millennial woman had moved to digital and were not going to "age up" to their magazine. This has proven to be true, as magazine circulation continues to erode in the double digits every year.

An episode of the MTV animated show Daria titled "The Lost Girls", from Season 3, would poke fun at Pratt's image and magazine. In the episode, an over-the-top name-dropping fashionista named Val, editor of Val magazine, visits Lawndale High after Daria wins an essay contest. Ultimately, Daria confronts Val about the unrealistic expectations that these fashion magazines force on young girls and about the mass-marketing of popular culture.

== See also ==
- List of Jane magazine cover models
