= Southern Belles: Louisville =

- Genre: Reality Show
- Created by: Bruce Romans
- Starring: Emily Gimmel; Hadley Hartz; Julie Smith; Kellie Frey; Shea Johnson
- Country of origin: United States
- No. of seasons: 1
- No. of episodes: 11

Production
- Executive producers: Donald Bull; R. Greg Johnston; Joe Livecchi
- Production location: Louisville, Kentucky
- Camera setup: Multi-camera
- Running time: 60 mins
- Production companies: Endemol USA; ABC Media Productions

Original release
- Network: Soapnet
- Release: May 21 – July 23, 2009

Southern Belles: Louisville is an American reality television series on the Soapnet cable network that aired for one season from May 21 to July 23, 2009. The show focused on the lives of five women in Louisville, Kentucky.

== Cast ==
- Emily Gimmel
- Hadley Hartz
- Julie Smith
- Kellie Frey
- Shea Johnson

== Episodes ==
=== Season 1 (2009) ===
No.	Title	Original airdate
1	"Pilot: Meet the Belles"	May 21, 2009
2	"New Beginnings"	May 28, 2009
3	"The Belles Bond"	June 4, 2009
4	"Engagements and Break-Ups"	June 11, 2009
5	"Facing Our Differences"	June 18, 2009
6	"Back in the Saddle"	June 25, 2009
7	"Life's Ups and Downs"	July 2, 2009
8	"Reality Check"	July 9, 2009
9	"Big Decisions"	July 16, 2009
10	"Finale: Circle Of Friends"	July 23, 2009
11	"Louisville Countdown To The Belles"	May 14, 2009
