= List of Jane magazine cover models =

Jane was a women's fashion magazine owned by Conde Nast Publications. Each cover featured a model, actor/actress or singer. It started in 1997 with the September/October issue and ended publication in 2007 with the August issue.

== 2007 ==
August: Eva Mendes

June/July: Zooey Deschanel

May: Bryce Dallas Howard & Kirsten Dunst

April: Avril Lavigne

March: Drew Barrymore

February: Mandy Moore

== 2006 ==
December/January 2007: Hilary Duff

November: Jessica Simpson

October: Christina Aguilera

September: Eva Longoria

August: Heidi Klum

June/July: Anne Hathaway

May: Liv Tyler

April: Ashlee Simpson

March: Kate Beckinsale

February: Alicia Keys

== 2005 ==
December/January 2006: Shakira

November: Nicole Richie

October: Jessica Alba

September: Hilary Duff

August: Kelly Clarkson

June/July: Anna Kournikova

May: Pamela Anderson

April: Brittany Murphy

March: Penélope Cruz

February: Paris Hilton

== 2004 ==
December/January 2005: Lindsay Lohan

November: Christina Applegate

October: Mischa Barton

September: Christina Aguilera

August: Julia Stiles

June/July: Drew Barrymore

May: Alicia Silverstone

April: Kate Winslet

March: Meg Ryan

January/February: Charlize Theron

== 2003 ==
December: Halle Berry

November: Cate Blanchett

October: Lucy Liu

September: Lisa Marie Presley

August: Pamela Anderson

June/July: Angelina Jolie

May: Beck & Heather Graham

April: Naomi Watts

March: Beyoncé

January/February: Liv Tyler

== 2002 ==
December: Faith Hill

November: Rebecca Romijn

October: Madonna

September: Jennifer Love Hewitt

August: Lara Flynn Boyle

June/July: Pamela Anderson

May: Christina Ricci

April: Uma Thurman

March: Britney Spears

January/February: Gwen Stefani

== 2001 ==
December: Rose McGowan

November: Carmen Electra & Dave Navarro / Shirley Manson, P. Diddy & Alicia Keys (two cover issue)

October: Hilary Swank

September: Charlize Theron

August: Ashton Kutcher

June/July: Cuba Gooding Jr.

May: Courtney Love

April: Liv Tyler

March: Courteney Cox

January/February: Julianne Moore

== 2000 ==
December: Renée Zellweger

November: Kate Hudson

October: Katie Holmes

September: Elizabeth Hurley

August: Snoop Dogg

June/July: Angelina Jolie

May: Whitney Houston

April: Monica Lewinsky

March: Madonna

January/February: Angelina Jolie

== 1999 ==
December: Pamela Anderson

November: Lisa Kudrow

October: Keri Russell

September: Natalie Portman

August: Courtney Love

June/July: Minnie Driver

May: Neve Campbell

April: Mariah Carey

March: Claire Danes

January/February: Gillian Anderson

== 1998 ==
December: Christian Slater

November: Reese Witherspoon

October: Janet Jackson

September: Cameron Diaz

August: Liv Tyler

June/July: Pamela Anderson

May: Halle Berry

April: Meg Ryan

March: Jenna Elfman

January/February: Courteney Cox

== 1997 ==
November/December: Robin Wright

September/October: Drew Barrymore
