= PrankStars =

- Genre: Reality
- Created by: The Walt Disney Company
- Presented by: Mitchel Musso
- Theme music composer: Mitchel Musso
- Opening theme: "Look On Your Face", performed by Mitchel Musso
- Country of origin: United States
- Original language: English
- No. of seasons: 1
- No. of episodes: 6

Production
- Executive producers: Barry Poznick; John Stevens; Charles Steenveld; Rick de Oliveira
- Production company: ZOO Productions

Original release
- Network: Disney Channel (episodes 1–4); Disney XD (episodes 5–6)
- Release: July 15 – December 16, 2011

Related
- Code 9

PrankStars (stylized as Prank★Stars) is an American reality television series that aired monthly and employed the use of a hidden camera. The series premiered on Disney Channel on July 15, 2011, and was hosted by Pair of Kings and Hannah Montana star, Mitchel Musso. The television program portrayed scenarios in which children and teenagers met their favorite stars in "unpredictable and humorous" settings that had been engineered by their friends and family. The show was Disney Channel's first reality series since the Totally in Tune show. In Canada, Family Channel aired two episodes of PrankStars on September 30, 2011, and a total of four episodes were originally supposed to broadcast before the series was withdrawn. The fourth episode aired a day before Musso's mid-October 2011 arrest on a charge of driving while intoxicated (and subsequent removal from the cast of Pair of Kings), and the remaining two episodes premiered solely in Europe and Latin America.

== Stars ==
Episode	Star	From
1	Selena Gomez	Wizards of Waverly Place
1	Debby Ryan	The Suite Life on Deck
1	Mitchel Musso	Pair of Kings, Hannah Montana
2	China Anne McClain	A.N.T. Farm
2	Adam Hicks	Lemonade Mouth, Zeke and Luther
3	Zendaya	Shake It Up, Frenemies
3	Cody Simpson	Musician/band
4	Tiffany Thornton	So Random!, Sonny with a Chance
4	Leo Howard	Kickin' It, Leo Little's Big Show
5	Raven-Symoné	That's So Raven, The Cheetah Girls 2
5	Bella Thorne	Shake It Up, Frenemies
6	Allstar Weekend	Musician/band
6	Bridgit Mendler	Good Luck Charlie, Lemonade Mouth

== Episodes ==
No.	Title	Original release date	Prod. code	US viewers (millions)
1	"Something To Chew On"	July 15, 2011	101	3.9
In the opening episode, Selena Gomez is disguised for the purpose of assisting a girl with a television commercial audition; Debby Ryan recruits a sales girl for a fashion show after falling ill in the clothes store that the girl is employed by; and Mitchel Musso's real-life best friend does not show up at a restaurant, resulting in the enlistment of fifteen-year-old Luke for a "best friend" interview. Guest stars: Selena Gomez, Debby Ryan and Mitchel Musso
2	"Game Showed Up"	August 12, 2011	102	3.4
China Anne McClain competes against her biggest fan, fourteen-year-old Sakoiya, for the chance to become a television game show host. However, the pressure is heightened when the game show's producer shows favoritism towards China Anne during the challenges. Meanwhile, when Adam Hicks loses his voice prior to an important radio interview, it is up to his unsuspecting "#1" fan, twelve-year-old Zak, to act as Hicks during the live interview. Guest stars: China Anne McClain and Adam Hicks
3	"Walk the Prank"	September 23, 2011	106	2.4
Zendaya's family's new pirate-themed restaurant is short-staffed in the lead-up to an important restaurant review; Zendaya proceeds to enlist the help of an unsuspecting patron, eleven-year-old Jordan, to substitute as a "swashbuckling" waitress. However, a problem ensues after Jordan inadvertently upsets the food critic. Meanwhile, Cody Simpson invites his biggest fan, fourteen year-old Emily, to join him on stage during a special acoustic concert; however, Emily is unaware that the performance is a live global broadcast. Guest stars: Zendaya and Cody Simpson
4	"Stick It To Me"	October 16, 2011	104	3.3
Due to difficulties with the composition of a song for a new video game device, Tiffany Thornton enlists the help of her "#1" fan, twelve year-old Darby, and they proceed to collaborate on the lyrics and use silly props to inspire the creative process. However, Darby's songwriting skills impress the producer and she is asked to write the entire song without Thornton. Meanwhile, Leo Howard's biggest fan, fourteen year-old Matt, is surprised to see Howard join him in a martial arts class that specializes in a fake form of karate, "Floating Swan". When Howard challenges the Sensei to a battle to decide which form is better—Floating Swan or "Kicking Panther"—Matt is recruited by Howard and receives a "crash course" in Kicking Panther prior to the battle. Guest stars: Tiffany Thornton and Leo Howard
5	"Adventures in Dogsitting"	November 25, 2011 (UK)	105	2.53
Raven-Symoné fan, Jade, meets her idol while looking after a dog. Summer attends a fake "flash mob" dance audition run by Bella Thorne. Note: This episode premiered in the UK on November 25, 2011. Guest stars: Raven-Symoné and Bella Thorne.
6	"Secret Agent"	December 16, 2011 (UK)	103	N/A
American pop band, Allstar Weekend, meet Stephanie, a fan of the band, while she is tending to the phones at a fake talent agency. Twins, Abigaille and Emily, meet their idol, Bridgit Mendler, at the staging of a fake environmental ad campaign. Note: This episode premiered in the UK on December 16, 2011 as part of "Christmas Night of Premieres" (the episode was also broadcast in Spain, Australia and Russia). Guest stars: Allstar Weekend and Bridgit Mendler

== See also ==
- Punk'd
- Code: 9
- Walk the Prank
