= Greg Behrendt's Wake Up Call =

2009 American reality television series

- Created by: Greg Behrendt; Garth Holsinger; Jason Irwin
- Starring: Greg Behrendt
- Country of origin: United States
- No. of episodes: 6

Production
- Producer: Avalon Television
- Running time: 60 minutes

Original release
- Network: SoapNet
- Release: January 8 – February 12, 2009

Greg Behrendt's Wake-Up Call is an American reality television series that aired on SoapNet from January 8 to February 12, 2009. The series was hosted by stand-up comedian and author Greg Behrendt.

The series, like Behrendt's previous effort (a daily syndicated talk show), specialized in dealing with couples and their relationship problems. The major difference between Wake-Up Call and The Greg Behrendt Show was that the relationships were dealt with in person rather than in a television studio.

Originally, Wake-Up Call was supposed to air on ABC in the 2006–2007 season, as the six-episode series was scheduled to be a midseason replacement. However, ABC never aired the episodes and the series sat unaired for two years until corporate sibling SoapNet began airing the series.
