= Totally Hoops =

- Logo
- Created by: Douglas Ross; J. Rupert Thompson
- Starring: Ashley Brown; Michele DeVault; Lauren Bahun; Alisha Grusz; Shelby Georges; Kristen Shenk; Lindsey Goldsberry; Aisha Jefferson; Tiffany Williams; Steve Douglas; Maria Getty; Ashley Burtsfield; Matt Gatzulis
- Country of origin: United States
- Original language: English
- No. of seasons: 1
- No. of episodes: 16

Production
- Executive producers: Douglas Ross; Greg Stewart; J. Rupert Thompson
- Producer: Laura Z. Thompson
- Running time: 22 minutes
- Production company: Evolution Media

Original release
- Network: Disney Channel
- Release: January 7 – November 3, 2001

Totally Hoops is a Disney Channel reality television series. It tracked the experiences of eleven girls on the Dayton, Ohio Lady Hoopstars, a nationally acclaimed 14-and-under AAU basketball team, throughout the 2000s.

== The Hoopstars ==
- 5 – Maria Getty: 5'8" guard, age 13
- 11 – Lauren Bahun: 5'8" guard, age 14
- 12 – Shelby Georges: 5'7" guard, age 13,
- 13 – Alisha Grusz: 5'9" forward, age 13
- 20 – Michele DeVault: 5'10" center, age 14
- 22 – Aisha Jefferson: 5'8" forward, age 13
- 23 – Ashley Burtsfield: 5'8" guard, age 13
- 24 – Kristen Shenk: 5'9" guard, age 14
- 25 – Lindsey Goldsberry: 5'8" guard, age 13
- 32 – Ashley Brown: 5'10" forward, age 13
- 45 – Tiffany Williams: 7'0" center, age 13
- 40 - Kelsey Bruce : 5’6” guard, age 13
- Coach: Steve Douglas

== Episodes ==
No.	Title	Original air date
1-2	"Making The Cut"	January 7, 2001
3	"Meet The Hoopstars"	January 14, 2001
4	"It's How You Play The Game"	January 21, 2001
5	"Meet Your Match"	January 28, 2001
6	"No Pain, No Game"	April 2, 2001
7	"West Virginia, Here We Come"	April 15, 2001
8	"I'm Trying To Quit"	February 18, 2001
9	"Home Sweet Home"	February 25, 2001
11	"Underachievers Anonymous"	November 3, 2001
12	"The End Of The World As We Know It"	March 25, 2001
13	"Enemy Of The States"	January 4, 2001
14	"Here Comes The Sun"	August 4, 2001
15–16	"Nationals"	November 2, 2001
17	"Some Like It Hot"	November 3, 2001
18	"Underachievers Anonymous"	November 3, 2001
