= Atlas Machine and Supply, Inc. =

- Company type: Privately held
- Industry: Manufacturing
- Founded: 1907
- Headquarters: Louisville, Kentucky
- Number of locations: Nine facilities
- Key people: Richard Gimmel III, Chief Operating Officer
- Products: Engineering; Machining; Metrology; Forging; Stamping; Maintenance; Nitrogen generators; Air Compressors
- Number of employees: 260 (2023)
- Website: atlasmachine.com

Atlas Machine and Supply, Inc., founded in 1907, is one of the largest heavy capacity industrial machinery engineering, manufacturing, and remanufacturing centers in the United States. The company performs field machining repairs onsite for industries located throughout the United States and around the world.

Atlas also designs and repairs industrial compressors and related equipment.

== History ==
In 1907, the company was officially formed by the Gimmel family from Switzerland who immigrated to the United States roughly 30 years before then. Manufacturing began with elevators at a small shop in downtown Louisville in Kentucky. In the decades which followed, Atlas gradually expanded its machine shop and industrial engineering capabilities to include the repair, design, and remanufacturing of heavy industrial machinery. Atlas also became a compressor distributor in the 1940s and continues to provide compressed air solutions today.

Other expanded capabilities included the launch of a division for field machining in 2011, which mirrors its machine shop capabilities for customers with on-site repair needs. Atlas further expanded its onsite expertise with a new laser tracking metrology service in 2012, allowing for completing large-scale machining jobs at the customer's job site.

== Locations ==
As of August 2023, Atlas had approximately 260 employees. The company's headquarters is in Louisville and consists of a machine shop with more than 100,000 square feet. Additional facilities are located in Cincinnati, Ohio; Columbus, Ohio; Evansville, Indiana; Indianapolis, Indiana; Lexington, Kentucky; Harned, Kentucky; and Nashville.

== Leadership ==
In 2014 Richard Gimmel III became the fourth generation of his family to lead the company as president. His father and former president, Richard Gimmel Jr., was chairman until he retired in 2019. In 2023, the company reorganized its operational structure to better manage the company's accelerated growth. The changes included Richard Gimmel lll assuming a new leadership role as CEO.
