= Mad Libs (game show) =

Television series

- Created by: David H. Higgins
- Written by: Sean Abley; Stefanie Wilder
- Directed by: Chris Darley
- Presented by: David Sidoni
- Country of origin: United States
- Original language: English
- No. of seasons: 2
- No. of episodes: 40

Production
- Executive producers: Dick Clark; Thomas F. Frank; Kurt Brendlinger; J D Roth
- Running time: 30 minutes
- Production companies: Slam Dunk Productions; Dick Clark Productions

Original release
- Network: Disney Channel
- Release: July 26, 1998 – 1999

Mad Libs is an American children's game show based on the book/word game series. It aired on the Disney Channel from July 26, 1998, to mid-1999 (with a "special pilot" that aired in February 1997), and was hosted by David Sidoni. Dick Clark and J. D. Roth produced the show.

== Gameplay ==
Mad Libs pitted two teams of two children (one red and the other blue), in a series of physical/mental-related challenges that pertain to the formula of the Mad Libs books, while trying to score points and win prizes.

=== Main Game ===
==== Round 1 (Viewer Mad Lib) ====
In round one, a home viewer recited a Mad Lib that he/she wrote beforehand. That Mad Lib became a physical game, where the objective was to make the most progress within a 45-second time limit or to be the first team to complete the stunt. The team who won the stunt were awarded 20 points. If there was a tie, both teams got the points.

==== Round 2 (Madder Than You) ====
Two teams awaiting to start the Madder Than You round.

In this two-minute round (2:30 in earlier episodes), the contestants would come up with a series of words that would fit a category given by Sidoni, controlling a white ball (referred to on air as the "hot potato") and passing it back and forth.

The process continued until one team gave a word that did not fit the category, repeated a word (including a different form of the same word), passed the hot potato without answering, or ran out of time. When one of those violations occurred, the other team received five points, after which another category was played in the same manner. If time for the round ran out when a category was in play, no points were awarded to either team.

==== Round 3 (Mega Stunt) ====
Both teams competed in a physical game, consisting of anything from picking nose hairs to grabbing mohawks while being strapped to a mailbag, to grab items needed to create a Mad Lib. Each item in the game had a word on it, and the object was to get four words in four categories. Doing so completed the Mad Lib and earned the winning team 20 points.

==== Round 4 (Mixed Up Mad Libs) ====
In this deciding round, Sidoni read a series of statements with a crazy word inserted in each one. The contestants buzzed in to correct those statements with the right word. If the buzz-in contestant answered incorrectly, the opposing team got a chance to answer. After each statement, the contestants at the buzzers switched places with their partners. Each correct answer was worth ten points. The round was played for 90 seconds, and the team with the most points when time ran out won the game. If both teams tied, one last Mixed-Up Mad Lib was read, and the first player to buzz-in and correct the statement won; otherwise his/her opponents automatically won. The winning team proceeded to the bonus round while the losing team went home with parting gifts.

==== Bonus Round (Maximum Mad Lib) ====
In the Maximum Mad Lib, the team decided who would give and who would receive. The giving player during the last commercial break placed five words (given to that player via envelope) anywhere in the five clue areas. After the break, the giver was given 90 seconds to get his/her partner to say those words. Sidoni gave the category to each word.

The clue areas varied each episode, which included:

- Stuff It-The player puts four marshmallows in their mouth and shouts the word. This clue area remained the same throughout the show's run
- Lick It- The player licks frosting onto a clear board spelling the word with their tongue.
- Spell It-The player takes bottles of ketchup and mustard and uses them to write the word out on the same clear board
- Draw It- Using either markers or finger paint, the player tries to draw a picture of the work
- Act It- The player acts out the word using pantomime and without speaking.
- Sing It- The player sings a description of the word, but cannot say the word.
- Rip It- A piece of paper is provided to the player who has to rip it into a shape that resembles the word.
- Mold It- Using a pile of miscellaneous junk, the player has to mold the material into something that could look like the word.

Each time the receiver said a word, the team won that word. They could pass on a word and return to it if time permitted. If an illegal clue was given, the word was removed from play. When time ran out, the words were inserted into the Mad Lib and were individually checked after it was read. One of the five words was dubbed the grand prize word and if the team solved that word, or if they solved all five words before time expired, they won the grand prize. Otherwise, they received a consolation prize.

== See also ==
- Mad Libs
