= The Big Fib =

American game show

- Genre: Reality; Game show
- Presented by: Yvette Nicole Brown; Rhys Darby as C.L.I.V.E.
- Country of origin: United States
- Original language: English
- No. of seasons: 1 (2 parts)
- No. of episodes: 30

Production
- Executive producers: Aaron Rothman; Josh Halpert; Irad Eyal; Leigh Hampton
- Producer: Yvette Nicole Brown
- Production company: Haymaker TV

Original release
- Network: Disney+
- Release: May 22 – October 23, 2020

The Big Fib is an American game show hosted by Yvette Nicole Brown and featuring Rhys Darby. The series premiered on Disney+ on May 22, 2020. New episodes were released on October 23, 2020. The series was removed from Disney+ on May 26, 2023.

== Premise ==
Two people claim to be experts in a similar field, and a child contestant asks them questions to determine which of the two is in fact not an expert and is "fibbing."

== Development ==
In early November 2019, it was revealed that Disney+ had ordered a game show consisting of 30 episodes based on then-named popular Gen-Z Media podcast Pants on Fire from Haymaker TV with Yvette Nicole Brown as host. In April 2020, it was revealed that part one of season one consists of 15 episodes.

== Episodes ==
No. overall	No. in season	Title	Original release date
Part 1
1	1	"Hair & Jellyfish"	May 22, 2020
2	2	"Nursing & Insects"	May 22, 2020
3	3	"Horses & The Moon"	May 22, 2020
4	4	"Bees & Volcanoes"	May 22, 2020
5	5	"Bottom Feeders & Super Heroes"	May 22, 2020
6	6	"Opera & Football"	May 22, 2020
7	7	"Circus & Farming"	May 22, 2020
8	8	"Stilts & Venom"	May 22, 2020
9	9	"Stunts & Animation"	May 22, 2020
10	10	"Fire Fighting & Ancient Egypt"	May 22, 2020
11	11	"Knitting & Oceans"	May 22, 2020
12	12	"Dogs & Storms"	May 22, 2020
13	13	"Dreams & Killer Plants"	May 22, 2020
14	14	"Bikers & Brians"	May 22, 2020
15	15	"Toys & Monkeys"	May 22, 2020
Part 2
16	1	"Tap Dancing & Outer Space"	October 23, 2020
17	2	"Cheese & Penguins"	October 23, 2020
18	3	"Shipwrecks & Auto Racing"	October 23, 2020
19	4	"Tree Climbing & Worms"	October 23, 2020
20	5	"Math & Faces"	October 23, 2020
21	6	"Ice Cream & Street Art"	October 23, 2020
22	7	"Food Science & Fossils"	October 23, 2020
23	8	"Teeth & Architecture"	October 23, 2020
24	9	"Bats & Baseball"	October 23, 2020
25	10	"Butterflies & Snakes"	October 23, 2020
26	11	"Desert & Skyscrapers"	October 23, 2020
27	12	"Mars & Sharks"	October 23, 2020
28	13	"Tie Dye & Special Effects"	October 23, 2020
29	14	"Drums & Spiders"	October 23, 2020
30	15	"Soccer & Artificial Intelligence"	October 23, 2020

== Release ==
The 15-episode first part of the season was released May 22, 2020 on Disney+. Part two premiered on Disney+ on October 23, 2020. The series was removed from Disney+ on May 26, 2023.

== Reception ==
=== Critical response ===
Joel Keller of Decider declared that the game show is entertaining for both adults and kids, stating it manages to be "one of the better" family game shows, and claimed that Yvette Nicole Brown makes an agreeable host, while finding Rhys Darby amusing across his character. Emily Ashby of Common Sense Media rated the show four out of five stars, stating, "This fun and funny show has broad appeal and will entertain families, and the facts that are shared by the actual expert can teach the audience a thing or two. That said, parents can also use the show to talk with kids about honesty and the consequences of telling fibs in the real world."

=== Accolades ===
Year	Award	Category	Nominee(s)	Result	Ref.
2021	Daytime Emmy Awards	Outstanding Hairstyling	The Big Fib	Nominated	
