= EPCOT Magazine =

Television series

Logo of the newsmagazine program.

EPCOT Magazine is an American newsmagazine television program that aired on The Disney Channel, premiering on the channel's first day of programming on April 18, 1983. It ended in 1985 after 3 seasons.

== Format ==
Originating from EPCOT in Florida, host Michael Young, along with a different celebrity co-host, would present segments on focusing on topical news and entertainment, with subjects ranging from art, food, fashion, and travel. In 1984, a special two-part episode featured a visit to the Walt Disney Archives.

The series ran for an hour on weekday afternoons, with a half-hour evening edition and a full-hour weekend edition presenting recaps of the week's stories.

== See also ==
- List of programs broadcast by Disney Channel § Former programming
