= Disney Family Album =

- Genre: Documentary
- Narrated by: Buddy Ebsen
- Country of origin: United States
- No. of episodes: 20

Production
- Running time: 25 minutes

Original release
- Network: Disney Channel
- Release: June 9, 1984 – January 2, 1986

Disney Family Album is a half-hour documentary series on the Disney Channel that aired during the 1980s. It was narrated by Buddy Ebsen. The series looked at the artists and performers that help create Disney's movies and parks.

== Episodes ==
No.	Title	Original release date
1	"Clarence "Ducky" Nash"	June 9, 1984
2	"Ward Kimball"	July 1, 1984
3	"Sherman Brothers"	August 1, 1984
4	"Jimmy MacDonald"	September 5, 1984
5	"Milt Kahl"	October 2, 1984
6	"Ken Anderson"	November 5, 1984
7	"Disneyland Designers"	December 2, 1984
On camera interviews with John Hench, Herbert Ryman, Morgan "Bill" Evans, and a very young Tony Baxter
8	"Eric Larson"	January 7, 1985
9	"Peter Ellenshaw and Harrison Ellenshaw"	February 3, 1985
10	"Woolie Reitherman"	March 1, 1985
11	"Frank Thomas"	April 3, 1985
12	"Voice Actors"	May 2, 1985
On-camera interviews with John Byner, Phil Harris, Will Ryan, Sterling Holloway, Dickie Jones, Paul Winchell, Wayne Allwine, Hal Smith, Alan Young, John Hurt, Kathryn Beaumont, Eva Gabor, Adriana Caselotti, and Ward Kimball talking about the voices of the Seven Dwarfs
13	"WED Imagineers"	June 2, 1985
On-camera interviews with Randy Bright, Bill Justice, Tim Delaney, X. Atencio, and Dave Feiten
14	"Golden Horseshoe Revue"	July 1, 1985
On-camera interviews with Wally Boag, Fulton Burley, Betty Taylor, and Dana Daniels
15	"Ollie Johnston"	August 4, 1985
16	"Annette Funicello"	September 1, 1985
17	"Marc Davis"	October 4, 1985
18	"The Milottes and the Beebes"	November 5, 1985
On camera interviews with True-Life Adventures documentary photographers Alfred and Elma Milotte and Lloyd Beebe
19	"Fess Parker/Buddy Ebsen"	December 2, 1985
20	"The Storymen"	January 2, 1986
On camera interviews with story artists Vance Gerry, Larry Clemmons, and Jack Hannah
