= Aisha Jefferson =

American basketball player (born 1986)

Personal information
- Born: October 27, 1986 (age 40) Dayton, Ohio
- Listed height: 6 ft 1 in (1.85 m)

Career information
- High school: Chaminade Julienne (Dayton, Ohio)
- College: Michigan State (2005–2010)
- WNBA draft: 2010: undrafted
- Playing career: 2010–2016
- Position: Forward

Career history
- 2011–2012: Clube Desportivo Torres Novas
- 2015–2016: Atlanta Legends

Career highlights
- WUBA All-Star (2016); Big Ten All-Freshman Team (2006); Ms. Basketball of Ohio (2005)

Aisha Jefferson (born October 27, 1986) is an American former professional basketball player. She played college basketball for Michigan State University.

== College career ==
After earning all-Big Ten freshman recognition for the 2005–06 season and scoring 10.4 points per game as a sophomore, Jefferson was forced to miss the 2007–08 season to undergo surgery to repair a torn anterior cruciate ligament. She was an honorable mention All-Big Ten in 2006–07 and 2008–09 and ended her college career as 11th on the MSU all-time scoring list with 1,194 points.

=== Statistics ===
Legend
GP	Games played	GS	Games started	MPG	Minutes per game
FG%	Field goal percentage	3P%	3-point field goal percentage	FT%	Free throw percentage
RPG	Rebounds per game	APG	Assists per game	SPG	Steals per game
BPG	Blocks per game	PPG	Points per game	**Bold**	Career high

Year	Team	GP	Points	FG%	3P%	FT%	RPG	APG	SPG	BPG	PPG
2005–06	Michigan State	**34**	225	42.7%	25.0%	60.0%	5.0	1.1	1.5	**0.5**	6.6
2006–07	Michigan State	33	343	41.9%	11.1%	65.3%	**5.6**	**4.6**	**1.6**	0.5	10.4
2008–09	Michigan State	33	367	42.6%	21.9%	**70.4%**	5.2	1.2	1.0	0.2	**11.1**
2009–10	Michigan State	33	259	**45.0%**	**29.0%**	70.3%	3.8	1.2	0.5	0.3	7.8
Career		133	1194	42.9%	23.7%	67.1%	4.9	1.3	1.1	0.4	9.0
