= Off the Wall (game show) =

American children's game show

- Created by: Vin Di Bona Productions
- Presented by: Larry Zeno
- Narrated by: Kelli Kirkland
- Country of origin: United States

Production
- Running time: 30 minutes
- Production companies: Media Arts Entertainment; Vin Di Bona Productions

Original release
- Network: Disney Channel
- Release: July 27, 1998 – 1999

Off the Wall is an American children's game show produced by Vin Di Bona Productions that was shown on the Disney Channel from July 27, 1998, to 1999. It was hosted by Larry Zeno, and co-hosted by Kelli Kirkland.

== Gameplay ==
Two teams of three children compete in a series of weird, outrageous and unusual events; all played against nine pre-videotaped on-the-street contestants.

=== Rounds 1 and 2 ===
In the first two rounds, one player from each team chose a video on-the-street player from the wall (hence the name of the show) to play against in a stunt. A brief videotaped interview was then played, after which host Zeno explained the stunt. The stunt began with Zeno and the audience counting down (5... 4... 3... 2... 1... GO!), and the in-studio player's job was to beat the videotaped on-the-street player (sometimes within a time limit). If successful, the contestant earned points for the team, if unsuccessful, no points were awarded (ties always went to the on-the-street player).

One of the on-the-street players was dubbed the "Double Trouble" player, so-called because if the in-studio contestant wins the stunt, he/she earned double the points for the team.

==== Point values ====
Rounds	Single	Double
Round 1	100	200
Round 2	200	400

=== Round 3 (Head-to-Head Challenge) ===
The final two players from both teams competed against each other and one last video player in this deciding round called "The Head-to-Head Challenge". To start, the video challenger's interview was played, then the challenge was explained and played. The first studio contestant to beat the video challenger earned 300 points, with an additional 250 points awarded for beating the studio opponent. (In the event of a tie between studio players, no points were awarded.)

The team with the most points won the game and went on to play for a grand prize. All contestants on both teams won passes to Disneyland. The theoretical maximum score was 1,050 points (100 in round 1, 400 in round 2 [via "Double Trouble"], and 550 in round 3).

=== The Ultimate Showdown (Bonus Round) ===
In the bonus game, the winning team played one last game, this time against a member of the studio audience. After the game was explained, the round began. If any member of the winning team could beat the audience member, the team won a grand prize for each team member; if not, the audience member won the grand prize and the winning team took home a consolation prize. Regardless of the outcome, the audience member won passes to Disneyland.
