= The Fashionista Diaries =

2007 television series

The Fashionista Diaries was a reality show that aired on SOAPnet in the summer of 2007 as a part of SOAPnet's original programming. The show could also be seen on ABC's website and is available for download on iTunes. The show followed six assistants in the competitive world of fashion and beauty in New York City. The assistants worked all summer, culminating with New York Fashion Week, where they would also learn who would be given a full-time job.

== Format ==
Each episode would include an evaluation of the assistants' performance by their supervisor(s) at their respective organizations. The evaluation was either individual or in a couple. All six assistants would also meet each week to "catch up" and as their respective supervisors noted in the first episode ("Big Dreams"), a camaraderie between them would be important during New York Fashion Week as they were expected to work together.

== The Assistants ==
Bridget Helene and Nicole Amendolare worked at Seventh House PR. Nicole soon resigned and Laurie Hugill was hired to fill her position. Tina Patient and Janjay Sherman worked for Flirt! Cosmetics. While Andrew Kanakis and Rachel Jacoby began as assistants at the now-defunct Jane magazine (as one episode would chronicle), they would eventually land assistant positions at CosmoGIRL! magazine.

== Jane Magazine ==
Brandon Holley was editor-in-chief at Jane magazine at the time that it folded. Stephanie Trong was executive editor. While they both took part in getting Andrew and Rachel acclimated at the magazine, Stephanie was their primary mentor. It has been suggested that Jane magazine opted to take part in the show hoping it would do the same thing The Hills did for Teen Vogue in terms of boosting magazine circulation.

== Episodes ==
Episode 1: "Big Dreams"
It's the assistants first day! Bridget is anxious to get started at Seventh House PR, while Nicole is apprehensive, worrying that people will be "maybe mean." They meet director Mandie Erickson and publicist Matt Kays. Mandie quizzes the girls about fashion week and quickly establishes herself as curt when she calls Nicole out on wearing flip flops. Mandie asks the girls about their favorite designers. Bridget names Stretsis, while Nicole naively praises Juicy Couture.

Next we meet Tina and Janjay, who will report to Kathleen Pierce, VP of Communications at Flirt! Cosmetics. Tina says that she's optimistic about finding her dream job, and Janjay asserts that more things can be accomplished with fewer people. Kathleen tells the girls that she expects them to "immerse themselves in the brand" immediately.

Finally, we meet Rachel and Andrew. Rachel says that she will try to mask her "awkwardness" and Andrew tells us that he entered the fashion world to meet girls. At Jane, editor-in-chief Brandon briefs the assistants about the magazine and questions their familiarity. Andrew admits that he's only picked up an issue or two before coming and Rachel gushes about how it's her absolute favorite magazine. All of the assistants are told that they'll be working with each other during fashion week, as well as other events over the summer, and so it is important that they forge a relationship.

Rachel and Andrew are sent on their first assignment. They are told that they must be photographed naked for the "naked issue" of the magazine. Before they take off their robes, Stephanie tells them that they've been "Jane pranked" and will write the prank page for the next issue.

Janjay's first assignment is to create a trend board highlighting spring makeup looks. Tina is asked to put on makeup reflecting the spring look.

The assistants meet for the first time over drinks. When Andrew learns that Bridget is looking for a place to live in New York, he suggests that she move in with him. She accepts the offer. Later in the episode, Nicole becomes discouraged while working an event. She doubts the sincerity of the partygoers and is feels unsettled when Mandie does not acknowledge her.

Episode 2: "Where's Nicole?"
Bridget is frustrated when Nicole does not show up for work. Nicole tells her friends that she couldn't get out of bed to go to work and contemplates whether or not she's subconsciously ruining this opportunity for herself. Tina and Janjay clash at a meeting. Rachel and Andrew pitch story ideas at a meeting and must compete for a spot in the September issue. Sparks fly when Bridget and Andrew go to a party for charity.

Episode 3: "It's Not Always Glamorous!"

Episode 4: "Pick Me!"

Episode 5: "Thank God You're Here!"

Episode 6: "The Party's Over"

Episode 7: "It's a Super Saturday"

Episode 8: "What a Super Saturday!"

Episode 9: "A Game or Bust"

Episode 10: "The Survival of the Fittest"
