= Soapnet =

Defunct American pay television channel

- Final logo, used from 2007 to December 31, 2013
- Country: United States
- Broadcast area: United States
- Headquarters: Burbank, California

Ownership
- Owner: Disney–ABC Television Group (The Walt Disney Company)

History
- Launched: January 20, 2000; 26 years ago
- Closed: March 23, 2012; 14 years ago (officially)
- Replaced by: Disney Junior (as the network)

Links
- Website: sn.soapnet.go.com (Archive link)

Soapnet was an American basic cable network owned by the Disney–ABC Television Group division of The Walt Disney Company.

The network's programming was oriented towards the soap opera genre; at its launch, Soapnet carried primetime encores of ABC's current soaps, as well as reruns of classic daytime and primetime soap opera series. Soapnet also broadcast programming related to soap operas, including news and behind-the-scenes programs. In later years, Soapnet increased its focus on acquired reruns of drama series.

Due in part to a general decline in the soap opera genre as a whole, and the growing adoption of digital video recorders, cable/satellite video on demand, and streaming video options making its primetime soap encores increasingly unnecessary on a traditional linear network, Disney announced in 2010 that Soapnet would be replaced by the new preschool-oriented network Disney Junior, which launched on March 23, 2012. While some providers removed Soapnet upon the launch of Disney Junior, the channel continued to operate on some providers until it finally closed on December 31, 2013.

== History ==
=== Early history (2000–02) ===
Soapnet launched on January 20, 2000; at the time of its launch, the channel aired only current ABC soap operas in the evening and early morning, as encore presentations. Programming was inclusive, as the channel was owned by ABC. Soapnet eventually gained high cable carriage due to Disney's aggressive policy of pulling ABC-owned broadcast stations and the ESPN channels from cable providers if they did not agree to carry Soapnet as well. This was the main reason for ABC owned-and-operated station WABC-TV being removed from Time Warner Cable's New York City system for two days in May 2000.

When Soapnet was announced, Sony Pictures Entertainment planned to launch a competing cable channel and website called SoapCity, which would air all CBS soap operas and the Sony-owned/produced NBC soap Days of Our Lives. The plans for the SoapCity cable channel were abandoned early in 2000 after Sony failed to secure cable carriage, though the website component remained.

Soapnet's inaugural lineup aired current soaps such as All My Children, One Life to Live, General Hospital and Port Charles, along with canceled daytime and nighttime soaps such as Falcon Crest, Knots Landing, The Colbys, Hotel, Sisters, and Ryan's Hope. Over the years, Soapnet introduced original programming such as Soap Center and Soap Talk, the latter of which was nominated for several Daytime Emmy Awards. Soap Center, which debuted on Soapnet's launch day schedule, was initially hosted by former soap stars Brooke Alexander and David Forsyth. They were replaced the following year by Peggy Bunker: based on the East Coast and covering New York-based soaps; and Tanika Ray discussing West Coast-based soaps. Peggy Bunker also hosted all events from Super Soap Weekend from Walt Disney World in Florida, including an exclusive interview with Susan Lucci. By 2003, the show stopped filming original material.

Other original series included 1 Day With, a half-hour program featuring interviews with soap actors, which was hosted by General Hospital actor Wally Kurth; I Wanna Be a Soap Star, a recurring reality series in which twelve young actors compete for a contract role on a daytime soap; and Soapography, a 30-minute show profiling the lives and current shows of two different soap opera actors.

=== Programming expansion (2002–10) ===
In 2002, Soapnet began airing reruns of Dynasty, and by 2003, the channel added highly requested programming such as reruns of Another World and Dallas; replacing Falcon Crest, The Colbys, Hotel, and Sisters. In 2004, Soapnet acquired the rights to broadcast Days of Our Lives episodes on a same-day basis. The channel also aired the 1975 to 1981 episodes of Ryan's Hope, which had not been seen on television since its 1989 cancellation by ABC. At that time, many viewers who did not have Soapnet at its inception petitioned to have the channel broadcast the show from the very beginning. In 2003, the channel aired the first episodes starting on St. Patrick's Day.

In 2004, Soapnet acquired reruns of the short-lived 1980s soap Paper Dolls. In January 2005, the channel began airing reruns of the Fox dramas Beverly Hills, 90210 and Melrose Place; this was followed that spring with the addition of repeats of short-lived nighttime soaps The Monroes and Skin. In July 2005, the network acquired the Fox primetime soap Pasadena, including nine episodes that were not aired during the show's initial run. On March 16, 2006, Soapnet announced that it had acquired the rights to broadcast same-day episodes of The Young and the Restless, which began airing on Soapnet on April 24, 2006, making it the first CBS network soap to air on the channel.

Since the channel was a subsidiary of The Walt Disney Company, it also broadcast events from the annual ABC Super Soap Weekend, which was held every November at Walt Disney World, and each summer at Disney's California Adventure until the last event in 2010. Soap Talk hosts Lisa Rinna and Ty Treadway served as hosts for question and answer sessions at the events, allowing fans to ask questions to their favorite soap stars.

Some viewers complained about what they viewed as an overabundance of prime-time programming on the channel, some of which (90210 and Melrose Place) had ended their original broadcast runs only a few years prior and had been repeated in syndication on other networks. These fans also objected to the large number of new episodes of the ABC lineup and Days of Our Lives, and repeatedly requested rebroadcasts of former daytime soaps such as Loving, The Edge of Night, Santa Barbara, and Search for Tomorrow.

On February 7, 2007, Soapnet acquired the rights to air reruns of The O.C. and One Tree Hill. The syndication deal also gave Soapnet an option to order a new season of One Tree Hill to air on the channel in an event that The CW were to cancel the show, although this option never exercised as first-run episodes of One Tree Hill remained on The CW for the remainder of the series' run until 2012.

In November 2007, Deborah Blackwell resigned as general manager of the channel and was replaced by then-ABC Daytime president Brian Frons. In August 2008, it was announced that Soapnet's broadcast rights for both Dallas and Melrose Place had expired; both shows were removed the schedule that September.

In 2009, the channel started to further expand its acquired programming; and began airing Greg Behrendt's Wake Up Call, a program that was originally set to air on ABC during the 2006–07 season. After airing the CBC Television series MVP (which was canceled by the CBC due to low ratings) in 2008, Soapnet also acquired the rights for the American broadcast of the Canadian dramedy Being Erica (which began in January 2009 on the CBC) beginning in February 2009. According to Nielsen Media Research, Soapnet was available to 75,259,000 cable and satellite subscribers in December 2010, an increase of 4 million subscribers from May 2009.

=== Decline, transition to Disney Junior and channel closure (2010–13) ===
Due to declining viewership in the genre, the Big Three networks had begun to cancel selected soaps and replace them with less-expensive talk show and game show programming, including ABC's All My Children and One Life to Live (an attempt to license the two soaps to Prospect Park to continue them as internet television series in 2013 was cancelled after a few months due to production and licensing conflicts), which were replaced with the cooking show The Chew (which aired until June 2018) and the lifestyle talk show The Revolution (which was canceled in April 2012 due to low ratings; its timeslot was assumed by General Hospital and the remaining hour given back to ABC's affiliates). The Chew did air on Soapnet for a short time on weekends with its five episodes for that week aired consecutively, but it was quickly removed due to negative viewer feedback. The decreasing number of active soaps, as well as the growing adoption of digital video recorders (which made it more convenient to record multiple soaps), along with cable and internet video on demand options to watch episodes online within a matter of hours, negated the further need for a linear channel devoted to the genre.

Disney–ABC Television Group head Anne Sweeney solicited concepts for a new network to replace Soapnet. The ABC Daytime division pitched two concepts for a women-focused network, including "Carrie" (named after Carrie Bradshaw of Sex and the City), which they described as a "hip and cool" channel, and "Disney Moms", which focused on programs "moms would want to watch and their families would watch with them". They competed with a proposal by Disney Channels Worldwide for a network devoted to preschool programming. Much to the dismay of the ABC Daytime staff, Sweeney would choose Disney Channel's proposal.

On May 26, 2010, Disney Junior was officially announced as Disney Channels Worldwide's new preschool television brand, replacing Playhouse Disney. Disney Junior would launch as a block on Disney Channel on February 14, 2011, and was to launch a 24-hour cable channel in January 2012, replacing Soapnet. On July 28, 2011, due to issues in reaching carriage deals for the new network, the launch of the Disney Junior channel was delayed to an unspecified date in early 2012. Disney Junior's launch date was later set to March 23, 2012. Disney also stated that on some providers, Disney Junior would be carried in parallel with Soapnet until the network was eventually closed. The Los Angeles Times reported that some television providers had been hesitant to immediately replace Soapnet with Disney Junior, as they "didn't want to risk legions of vocal soap opera fans getting into a lather, or worse, moving to a rival service."

On March 1, 2012, Soapnet's operations were taken over by ABC Family following the dismantling of the ABC Daytime corporate structure under Brian Frons, who had resigned in December 2011.

Some television providers, including certain Xfinity systems, immediately replaced Soapnet with Disney Junior in its channel space on launch. Soapnet continued to be carried on providers who had not yet made carriage agreements for Disney Junior (such as Dish Network), as well as for certain providers that retained Soapnet as part of their channel lineups, while also adding Disney Junior as an additional channel (such as Cablevision, DirecTV, Verizon FiOS, RCN. and Time Warner Cable). Same day rebroadcasts of General Hospital, Days of Our Lives and The Young and the Restless were retained, with repeats of ABC Family programming and reruns of Veronica Mars being added to the schedule. The rights to Veronica Mars were transferred to Pivot when that network launched in August 2013.

A 1-hour two-week Live Well Network block was broadcast on Soapnet weeknights from 11 PM to 12 AM (ET/PT) starting on July 30, 2012 through August 10, 2012.

On January 15, 2013, AT&T U-verse reached a new wide-ranging multi-year carriage agreement with Disney for its various broadcast and cable channels, which included the addition of Disney Junior. In April 2013, the broadcast rights to same-day broadcasts of The Young and the Restless previously held by Soapnet were replaced by TVGN (which CBS Corporation, owner of the show's originating broadcaster CBS, had acquired a 50% ownership stake in the previous month), the show moved to TVGN on July 1. TVGN (now Pop) also acquired same-day reruns of The Bold and the Beautiful after Soapnet closed, the soap was never carried by the network, and both were also carried in high definition on TVGN's HD simulcast network, along with eventually, Days of Our Lives. Same-day airings of soaps eventually left cable television altogether with ABC's General Hospital premiering the same day on Hulu, with Days of Our Lives moving exclusively to Peacock in the fall of 2022, and CBS's soaps carried as a part of Paramount+.

In November 2013, Disney announced that Soapnet would close on December 31, 2013. The network's impending closure had been previously reported by several cable providers, including AT&T U-verse, Comcast, Charter and Cox, among others. Soapnet quietly went dark shortly before midnight ET on January 1, 2014, after an airing of General Hospital.

== Programming ==
Prior to the switch to an automated schedule, repeats of current soap operas made up the majority of Soapnet's daily schedule; the channel usually aired daily episodes of network soaps it had carried (the previous weekday's broadcasts airing weekday mornings from 6:00 to 11:00 a.m. ET, along with two same-day evening airings with one block from 6:00 to 11:00 p.m. ET and a repeat of the earlier block from 12:00 to 5:00 a.m. ET). With the reduction to two first-run soaps on the schedule, from July 2013 up until Soapnet's closure, the timeslots in which same-day/day-behind repeats of the network soaps were reduced, with the two remaining first-run soaps airing on the channel, Days of Our Lives and General Hospital, airing in repeat blocks from 7:00 p.m. to 1:00 a.m. ET.

Prior to ABC's cancellations of the former two series in 2011, daily reruns of All My Children, One Life to Live and General Hospital aired on the channel in that respective order as they had aired on ABC's daytime schedule. All My Children had the most airings on the channel airing four times each weekday, one in the morning and three at night. Rebroadcasts of each soap's episodes for the entire week aired each Saturday and Sunday during the late afternoon and nighttime; as of 2012, the network aired the previous week's episodes of Days of Our Lives in Sunday primetime.

Due to it being owned by The Walt Disney Company, which also owns ABC, Soapnet cross-promoted All My Children and One Life to Live using the tagline "weekdays on ABC and weeknights on SOAPnet" when both shows aired on ABC. The same slogan continued to be used in promotions for General Hospital until the week of April 30, 2012 (inclusively). After a three-month hiatus, the "weekdays on ABC and weeknights on SOAPnet" slogan was revived in August 2012, but was used only for General Hospital promos airing on Soapnet and not those seen on ABC. References to Days of Our Lives's first-run airings on NBC (and until it was removed from Soapnet in July 2013, The Young and the Restless's first-run airings on CBS) were not included in the channel's promos, instead only advertising their telecasts on Soapnet.

The channel also aired primetime drama series such as One Tree Hill, Gilmore Girls and Beverly Hills, 90210 each weekday during the morning and afternoon, and as part of the "Breakfast in Bed" block between 6:00 a.m. and 3:00 p.m. ET each weekend. Weekend morning marathons of ABC's cooking show The Chew (which had replaced All My Children on ABC) aired for a short time in December 2012 before being quickly removed due to negative viewer reaction.

During the course of its lifetime, the channel occasionally aired past episodes in thematic format, such as Daytime's Most Unforgettable Weddings, spotlighting the best episodes of popular couples on ABC's soaps. Other thematic episode blocks included the "Sonnylicious!" marathon, featuring select episodes highlighting Maurice Benard's best performances as his General Hospital character Sonny Corinthos, and the "Tad the Cad" marathon, with classic 1980s episodes of All My Children involving the Michael E. Knight character of Tad Martin's romantic trysts with Liza Colby and her mother, Marian. These kinds of marathons were usually limited to series to which Soapnet had the rebroadcast rights (ABC's soaps, Days of Our Lives and previously, The Young and the Restless). However, in a lead-up to the 33rd Daytime Emmy Awards, the channel showed episodes of soaps that showcased performances that received award-nominating attention, including those from Guiding Light and As the World Turns, a first for the channel. Also, during its 13-year existence, the channel aired marathons of its acquired programs; such as on September 3, 2007, when it aired a marathon of The O.C. called "Summer Spice", showcasting the metamorphosis of Summer Roberts (played by Rachel Bilson) throughout the series.

=== Original dramatic programming ===
The network only aired one dramatic series produced exclusively for the network, a prime-time spin-off of General Hospital entitled General Hospital: Night Shift, which aired for two seasons from July 2007 to October 2008.

=== Syndicated programming ===
This is a list of programs formerly broadcast by Soapnet prior to its closure on December 31, 2013.

NOTE: Programs broadcast by Soapnet before shutdown.

=== Final television shows ===
- All My Children (2000–13)
- Beverly Hills, 90210 (2005–13)
- Brothers & Sisters (2011–13)
- Days of Our Lives (2004–13)
- General Hospital (2000–13)
- Gilmore Girls (2009–13)
- Lifestories: Families in Crisis (2008–13)
- One Life to Live (2000–13)
- One Tree Hill (2007–13)
- 7th Heaven (2005–13)
- Veronica Mars (2012–13)
- The Young and the Restless (2006–13)

=== Former television shows ===
- 1 Day With... (2004-05)
- Another World (2003–11)
- Being Erica (2009–12)
- The Colbys (2000–03)
- Dallas (2003–08)
- Dynasty (2002–06)
- Falcon Beach (2006–07)
- Falcon Crest (2000–03)
- The Fashionista Diaries (2007)
- General Hospital: Night Shift (2007–08)
- Greg Behrendt's Wake Up Call (2009)
- Holidate (2009)
- Hotel (2000–03)
- I Wanna Be a Soap Star (2004–07)
- Knots Landing (2000–06)
- Melrose Place (2004–08)
- The Monroes (2004)
- MVP (2008)
- The O.C. (2007–12)
- Paper Dolls (2005)
- Pasadena (2005)
- Port Charles (2000–09)
- Relative Madness (2008)
- Ryan's Hope (2000–11)
- Sisters (2000–03)
- Skin (2005)
- Soap Center (2000–04)
- Soap Talk (2002–06)
- Soapography (2004–11)
- Southern Belles: Louisville (2009)
- They Started on Soaps (2003–06)

=== Movies ===
In late 2008, the network entered into a distribution agreement with Sony Pictures Television to air a package of recent films from the studio's library and some archived content on weekend evenings, along with several 20th Century Fox films and some in ABC and ABC Family's telefilm archive aimed at the network's target audience. The network stopped airing films on April 30, 2011 as the network's began to decline, with much of its film library migrating to Lifetime Movie Network (which is owned in part by Disney through A&E Networks).

== See also ==
- ABC Daytime
