= Totally in Tune =

- Intertitle
- Country of origin: United States
- Original language: English
- No. of seasons: 1
- No. of episodes: 10

Production
- Executive producers: Douglas Ross; Greg Stewart; J. Rupert Thompson
- Running time: 22 minutes

Original release
- Network: Disney Channel
- Release: June 23 – August 18, 2002

Totally in Tune is a reality miniseries that aired on Disney Channel and ABC.

The series originally aired from June 17, to August 18, 2002.

During October–December 2006, Disney Channel aired seven-minute minisodes of Totally in Tune on its website.

== Plot ==
The series focuses on sixty orchestra members at Alexander Hamilton High School Academy of Music in Los Angeles, California. It follows rehearsals and performances as well as interpersonal drama, such as competition over a solo. The grand finale occurs in San Francisco at an orchestra competition.

== Production ==
The show combined traditional documentary filmmaking techniques with video diaries produced by the students. It was shot over a four month period.

== Episodes ==
1. "Tuning Up" (June 23, 2002)
2. "Concierto Night" (June 23, 2002)
3. "The Gig" (June 30, 2002)
4. "Making the Grade" (July 7, 2002)
5. "A Day in the Life of..." (July 14, 2002)
6. "Butting Heads" (July 21, 2002)
7. "Proving Yourself" (July 28, 2002)
8. "California or Bust" (August 4, 2002)
9. "Competition in California" (August 11, 2002)
10. "Tuning Down" (August 18, 2002)
