= List of programs broadcast by Disney Channel =

Current Disney Channel logo used since February 1, 2025.

This article lists past, present and future television programming on American basic cable channel and former premium channel, Disney Channel, since its launch on April 18, 1983.

== Current programming ==
- ^{1} Indicates it is a program shared with the Disney XD cable channel.

=== Original programming ===
==== Animated ====
Title	Premiere date	Current season	Source(s)
Phineas and Ferb^{1}	August 17, 2007	6	(Note: Select episodes premiered on Disney XD before airing on Disney Channel later.)
Big City Greens^{1}	June 18, 2018	5	(Note: The series was scheduled to premiere on Disney XD, but was moved to Disney Channel.)
Chibiverse^{1}	July 30, 2022	4	
Kiff^{1}	March 10, 2023	2	

==== Live-action ====
Title	Premiere date	Current season	Source(s)
Vampirina: Teenage Vampire	September 12, 2025	2	

==== Preschool (Disney Jr.) ====
Title	Premiere date	Current season	Note(s)
Spidey and His Amazing Friends	August 6, 2021	5	
SuperKitties	January 11, 2023	3	
Pupstruction	June 14, 2023	3	
Ariel	June 27, 2024	2	
RoboGobo	January 17, 2025	2	
Mickey Mouse Clubhouse+	July 21, 2025	2	
Iron Man and His Awesome Friends	August 11, 2025	1	
Hey A.J.!	January 13, 2026	1	
Magicampers	March 23, 2026	1	
Sofia the First: Royal Magic	May 25, 2026	1	

=== Acquired programming ===
==== Animated ====
Title	Premiere date	Current season	Source(s)
Miraculous: Tales of Ladybug & Cat Noir^{1}	April 8, 2019	7	(Note: Co-production.)
Ghostforce	November 1, 2021	1	(Note: Co-production.)

==== Preschool (Disney Jr.) ====
Title	Premiere date	Current season	Source(s)
Bluey	September 9, 2019	3	(Note: This series airs and/or has aired as part of Disney Jr., but is not an original series.)
Beddybyes	March 2, 2026	1	
Gracie's Corner	June 16, 2026	1	

=== Short-form programming ===
Title	Premiere date	Source(s)
Movie Surfers	June 1997	
Disney 365	2006	
Minnie's Bow-Toons/Minnie's Bow-Toons Party Palace Pals!	November 14, 2011	
Theme Song Takeover	April 21, 2019	
Random Rings	August 24, 2019	
Broken Karaoke	October 1, 2019	
Chibi Tiny Tales	June 14, 2020	
Reimagine Tomorrow	January 17, 2022	
How NOT to Draw	September 30, 2022	
Shorts Spectacular	March 8, 2024	
SuperKitties: Su-Purr Adventures	August 7, 2024	

=== Repeats of ended programming ===
==== Short-form ====
Title	Premiere date	Finale date	Date(s) reran	Note(s)
Mickey Mouse	June 28, 2013	July 20, 2019	2019–present	

== Upcoming programming ==
=== Original programming ===
==== Animated ====
Title	Premiere date	Source(s)
Artemis Fowl: The Animated Series	TBA	

==== Preschool (Disney Jr.) ====
Title	Premiere date	Note(s)
Cars: Lightning Racers	2027	
Marvel's Avengers: Mightiest Friends	2027	
Sam Witch	TBA	

=== Acquired programming ===
==== Animated ====
Title	Premiere date	Source(s)
Miraculous Chibi	2026	
Messi and the Giants	Mid-2027	
Miraculous Stellar Force	2027	
Warrior Cats	2028	
Kingdom Hearts: The Series	TBA	

==== Preschool (Disney Jr.) ====
Title	Premiere date	Source(s)
Megan and Cupcake Ready for Preschool	Late 2026	

=== In development ===
==== Animated ====
Title	Source(s)
Untitled Like Nastya series	

==== Live-action ====
Title	Source(s)
Aquamarine	
Eerie Prep	
LaLa IRL	
The Last Kids on Earth	

== Former programming ==
- ^{1} Indicates program premiered episodes on Disney XD.
- ^{2} Indicates program only airs reruns on the Disney XD cable channel.
- ^{3} Indicates program is a Disney Jr. original series.

=== Original programming ===
==== Animated ====
Title	Premiere date	Finale date	Date(s) reran	Note(s)
Disney Afternoon & other syndication
The New Adventures of Winnie the Pooh	January 17, 1988 – July 1988		1994–2006	(Note: Also aired as part of the Playhouse Disney block.)
Chip 'n Dale: Rescue Rangers	March 4, 1989 – May 21, 1989		1995–2000	(Note: Also aired as part of the Playhouse Disney block.)
TaleSpin	May 5, 1990 – July 15, 1990		1995–99	
Darkwing Duck	March 31, 1991 – July 14, 1991		1995–96; 1998–2000; 2004	
Adventures of the Gummi Bears	October 7, 1991– January 1997		—N/a	
Goof Troop	April 20, 1992 – July 12, 1992		1996–99	
Bonkers	February 28, 1993 – June 6, 1993		1998–2000	
Aladdin	February 6, 1994 – May 1, 1994		1997–2000	
DuckTales (1987)	October 2, 1995–2000			
Timon & Pumbaa	September 1, 1997–2000		2006–08	
Gargoyles	September 4, 1998 – 2000		2004	
Quack Pack	September 17, 1998 – 1999		—N/a	
101 Dalmatians: The Series	October 5, 1998 – 1999		2011–13	
Mighty Ducks: The Animated Series	August 9, 1998 – 1999		—N/a	
The Shnookums & Meat Funny Cartoon Show	1998		—N/a	
Hercules: The Animated Series	August 31, 1998 – March 1, 1999		1999–2000	
The Legend of Tarzan	2001 – September 2, 2003		—N/a	(Note: Originally aired as part of Disney's One Too block)
Disney Channel Originals
The Proud Family	September 15, 2001	August 19, 2005	2005–10; 2015–17	
Kim Possible	June 7, 2002	September 7, 2007	2007–10; 2014–15; 2017	^{2}
Lilo & Stitch: The Series	September 20, 2003	July 29, 2006	2006–10; 2014–15; 2025–26	^{2}
Dave the Barbarian	January 23, 2004	January 22, 2005	2005–09	
Brandy & Mr. Whiskers	August 21, 2004	August 25, 2006	2006–10	
American Dragon: Jake Long	January 21, 2005	September 1, 2007	2007–10; 2015	
The Buzz on Maggie	June 17, 2005	May 27, 2006	2006–08	
The Emperor's New School	January 27, 2006	November 20, 2008	2008–10	
The Replacements	July 28, 2006	March 30, 2009	2009–10	
Fish Hooks	September 3, 2010	April 4, 2014	2014	^{2}
Gravity Falls	June 15, 2012	February 15, 2016 (Note: The series ended on February 15, 2016, but moved to Disney XD for the remainder of its run on August 4, 2014, though re-runs of the series continued to air on Disney Channel during the time that the series premiered new episodes on Disney XD.)	2016–20	^{1} ^{2}
Wander Over Yonder	August 16, 2013	June 27, 2016 (Note: The series ended on June 27, 2016, but moved to Disney XD for the remainder of its run on March 31, 2014.)	—N/a	Moved to Disney XD full-time
Star vs. the Forces of Evil	January 18, 2015 (Note: The series was originally greenlit for Disney Channel in 2013, and premiered there as a preview on January 18, 2015, before moving its premieres to Disney XD starting on March 30, 2015, with Disney Channel continuing to air re-runs. The series moved back to Disney Channel on January 6, 2019, with Disney XD continuing to air re-runs during the time that new episodes premiered on Disney Channel.)	May 19, 2019	—N/a	^{1} ^{2}
Elena of Avalor	July 22, 2016	August 23, 2020 (Note: The show did officially end on August 23, 2020 on Disney Jr., but new episodes aired on Disney Jr. starting July 14, 2018, while Disney Channel aired reruns. But from late-2019 to early-2020 the show was pulled from Disney Channel’s preschool schedule and Disney Jr. barely aired reruns on its channel.)	2020	^{3}
Milo Murphy's Law	October 3, 2016	May 18, 2019	—N/a	^{1} ^{2}
Rapunzel's Tangled Adventure (Note: Originally titled Tangled: The Series until June 24, 2018, although until January 21, 2021, it was still labeled under that original name on Disney+)	March 10, 2017	March 1, 2020	2020; 2022–23; 2025	
DuckTales (2017)	August 12, 2017 (Note: The series originally premiered on Disney XD on August 12, 2017, with re-runs airing on Disney Channel during that time, but new episodes of the series moved to Disney Channel on May 1, 2018 while Disney XD airs reruns.)	March 15, 2021	2025–26	^{1} ^{2}
Big Hero 6: The Series	November 20, 2017 (Note: The series premiered simultaneously on Disney Channel and Disney XD on November 20, 2017. It was scheduled to have regular premieres on Disney XD, but was moved to Disney Channel after the premiere of the first episode, but was again later moved to Disney XD for the remainder of its run on January 4, 2020.)	February 15, 2021	—N/a	^{1} ^{2}
Star Wars Resistance	October 7, 2018	January 26, 2020	—N/a	^{1} ^{2}
Amphibia	June 17, 2019	May 14, 2022	2022–23	^{2}
The Owl House	January 10, 2020	April 8, 2023	2023–24	^{2}
The Ghost and Molly McGee	October 1, 2021	January 13, 2024	2024–26	^{2}
Hamster & Gretel	August 12, 2022	April 13, 2025	2025	^{2}
Monsters at Work	January 6, 2023 (Note: The series first premiered as a Disney+ original on July 7, 2021, with the series premiering later on Disney Channel on January 6, 2023. The series has moved to premiering first-run episodes on the Disney Channel, starting on April 5, 2024.)	May 4, 2024	2024–26	
Moon Girl and Devil Dinosaur	February 10, 2023	March 8, 2025	2025	^{2}
Hailey's On It!	June 8, 2023	May 18, 2024	2024	
Zombies: The Re-Animated Series	June 28, 2024	October 27, 2026	2026	
Primos	July 25, 2024	April 27, 2025	2025	^{2}
StuGo	January 11, 2025	May 3, 2025	2025	^{2}

===== Programming from Disney+ =====
Title	Premiere date	Finale date	Date(s) reran	Source(s)
The Wonderful World of Mickey Mouse	November 19, 2022	June 9, 2025	—N/a	
The Proud Family: Louder and Prouder	January 7, 2023	April 1, 2023	—N/a	
Chip 'n' Dale: Park Life	January 9, 2023	January 24, 2023	—N/a	
Win or Lose	June 7, 2025	June 28, 2025	2025	
Dream Productions	August 4, 2025	August 25, 2025	2025	

==== Comedy ====
Title	Premiere date	Finale date	Date(s) reran	Note(s)
Flash Forward	December 14, 1995	1997	1997–99	
The Famous Jett Jackson	October 25, 1998	June 22, 2001	2001–04	
The Jersey	January 30, 1999	March 23, 2004	2004	
Even Stevens	June 17, 2000	June 2, 2003	2003–07; 2013–2015; 2017	
Lizzie McGuire	January 12, 2001	February 14, 2004	2004–06; 2009–10; 2013–17; 2026	
That's So Raven	January 17, 2003	November 10, 2007	2007–10; 2014–18; 2026	
Phil of the Future	June 18, 2004	August 19, 2006	2006–08; 2013–15; 2017	
The Suite Life of Zack & Cody	March 18, 2005	September 1, 2008	2008–11; 2013–15; 2017; 2026	
Hannah Montana	March 24, 2006	January 16, 2011	2011; 2014–18; 2026	
Cory in the House	January 12, 2007	September 12, 2008	2008–10; 2013–17	
Wizards of Waverly Place	October 12, 2007	January 6, 2012	2012–17; 2019–20; 2024	
The Suite Life on Deck	September 26, 2008	May 6, 2011	2011–17	
Sonny with a Chance	February 8, 2009	January 2, 2011	2011; 2013–15; 2017; 2026	
Jonas	May 2, 2009	October 3, 2010	2010–11; 2013–14; 2017; 2026	
Good Luck Charlie	April 4, 2010	February 16, 2014	2014–22; 2026	
Shake It Up	November 7, 2010	November 10, 2013	2013–15; 2017	
A.N.T. Farm	May 6, 2011	March 21, 2014	2014–15; 2017	
Jessie	September 30, 2011	October 16, 2015	2015–26	
Austin & Ally	December 2, 2011	January 10, 2016	2016–18; 2020–23	
Dog with a Blog	October 12, 2012	September 25, 2015	2015–17	
Liv and Maddie	July 19, 2013	March 24, 2017	2017–22	
I Didn't Do It	January 17, 2014	October 16, 2015	2015–17	
Girl Meets World	June 27, 2014	January 20, 2017	2017–20	
K.C. Undercover	January 18, 2015	February 2, 2018	2018–22	
Best Friends Whenever	June 26, 2015	December 11, 2016	2016–18	
Bunk'd	July 31, 2015	August 2, 2024	2024–25	
Stuck in the Middle	February 14, 2016	July 23, 2018	2018–23	
Bizaardvark	June 24, 2016	April 13, 2019	2019–23	
Mech-X4	November 11, 2016	August 20, 2018 (Note: The series ended on August 20, 2018, but moved to Disney XD for the remainder of its run on September 9, 2017.)	—N/a	Moved to Disney XD full-time
Andi Mack	April 7, 2017	July 26, 2019	2019	
Raven's Home	July 21, 2017	September 3, 2023	2023–25	
Coop & Cami Ask the World	October 12, 2018	September 11, 2020	2020–22	
Sydney to the Max	January 25, 2019	November 26, 2021	2021; 2023	
Fast Layne	February 15, 2019	March 31, 2019	2019	
Just Roll with It	June 14, 2019	May 14, 2021	2021	
Gabby Duran & the Unsittables	October 11, 2019	November 26, 2021	2021	
The Villains of Valley View	June 3, 2022	December 1, 2023	2023–25	
Ultra Violet & Black Scorpion	June 3, 2022	November 11, 2022	2022	
Saturdays	March 24, 2023	May 12, 2023	2023	
Pretty Freekin Scary	June 15, 2023	August 18, 2023	2023	
Wizards Beyond Waverly Place	October 29, 2024	August 4, 2026	2026	
Electric Bloom	July 10, 2025	October 26, 2025	2025–26	

==== Drama ====
Title	Premiere date	Finale date	Date(s) reran	Note(s)
Teen Angel	April 24, 1989	May 22, 1989	1989; 1993; 2001	
Teen Angel Returns	October 2, 1989	October 22, 1989	1989; 1994; 2002	
The Secret of Lost Creek	February 1, 1992	March 1, 1992	1992	
Emerald Cove	September 8, 1993	1995	1993–1995	Spinoff of The All-New Mickey Mouse Club
So Weird	January 18, 1999	September 28, 2001	2001–2003	
In a Heartbeat	August 26, 2000	March 25, 2001	2001	
Secrets of Sulphur Springs	January 15, 2021	May 5, 2023	2023	

==== Reality ====
Title	Premiere date	Finale date	Date(s) reran	Note(s)
EPCOT Magazine	1983	1999	N/A	
Disney Family Album	June 1984	January 1986	1986–1989	
D-TV	1984	1989	1990–1999	
Walt Disney World Inside Out	1994	1996	N/A	
Disney Channel in Concert	1997	2001	2001–2002	
Bug Juice	February 28, 1998	October 15, 2001	2001; 2004	
2 Hour Tour	March 11, 2000	September 21, 2000	2000	
Totally Circus	June 16, 2000	September 24, 2000	2000	
Totally Hoops	January 7, 2001	April 15, 2001	2001	
Totally in Tune	June 23, 2002	August 18, 2002	2002; 2006	
Jonas Brothers: Living the Dream	May 16, 2008	May 31, 2010	—N/a	
PrankStars	July 15, 2011	December 16, 2011	2011	
Code: 9	July 26, 2012	September 28, 2012	2012; 2016	
Walk the Prank	April 1, 2016	July 16, 2018 (Note: The series ended on July 16, 2018, but moved to Disney XD for the remainder of its run on April 1, 2017.)	—N/a	Moved to Disney XD full-time
Bug Juice: My Adventures at Camp	July 16, 2018	August 9, 2018	2018	
Disney Fam Jam	February 23, 2020	December 4, 2020	2020	
Disney's Magic Bake-Off	August 13, 2021	December 3, 2021	2021–2022	

==== Game shows ====
Title	Premiere date	Finale date	Date(s) reran	Note(s)
Contraption	April 18, 1983	October 25, 1989	N/A	
Mad Libs	February 1997	1999	1999–2000	
Off the Wall	July 27, 1998	1999	1999–2000	
Win, Lose or Draw	January 17, 2014	May 21, 2014	2014	

==== Variety ====
Title	Premiere date	Finale date	Date(s) reran	Note(s)
Welcome to Pooh Corner	April 18, 1983	May 30, 1986	1986–1997	Live-action preschool
You and Me Kid	April 18, 1983	1986	1986–1991	
Mousercise	April 18, 1983	1996	N/A	
Dumbo's Circus	May 6, 1985	1989	1989–1997	Live-action preschool
Videopolis	1987	1989	N/A	
The All-New Mickey Mouse Club	April 24, 1989	March 7, 1996	1997–2002	
Adventures in Wonderland	March 23, 1992	1995	1995–1998	Live-action preschool
Audubon's Animal Adventures	September 8, 1996	1997	N/A	
Really Wild Animals	January 5, 1997	1997	N/A	
Omba Mokomba	1997	1998	N/A	
Going Wild with Jeff Corwin	1997	1999	N/A	
So Random!	June 5, 2011	March 25, 2012	2012; 2017	

==== Miniseries and specials ====
Title	Date(s) aired	Note(s)
The Disney Channel Salutes The American Teacher	1983–1997	
Samantha Smith Goes to Washington: Campaign '84	1984	
Videopolis: Startracks	1987–1990	
Disney's Young Musicians	1992–1998	
The Century That Made America Great	1995	
Disney Channel Games	2006–2008	
Pass the Plate	2007–2014	
Studio DC: Almost Live	2008	
Disney's Friends for Change Games	2011	
Make Your Mark Ultimate Dance-Off, Shake It Up Edition / Make Your Mark, Shake It Up Dance-Off	2011–2012	
SNAP!	2012	
High School Musical: 10th Anniversary	2016	
Under the Sea: A Descendants Short Story	2018	
Audrey's Royal Return: A Descendants Short Story	2019	
Disney's Hall of Villains	2019	
Wicked Woods: A Descendants Halloween Story	2019	
Holidays Unwrapped: A Disney Channel Music Event	2019	
Disney Channel Holiday Party @ Walt Disney World	2019	
Descendants Remix Dance Party	2020	
Disney Channel Summer Sing-Along	2020	
Disney Channel's Halloween House Party	2020	
Disney Channel's Holiday House Party	2020	
Disney Channel's Epic Holiday Showdown	2020	
Disney's Holiday Magic Quest	2020–2021	
Descendants: The Royal Wedding	2021	
Disney Princess Remixed - An Ultimate Princess Celebration	2021	
Disney's Summer Magic Quest	2022	
Mickey Saves Christmas	2022	
Disney100: Remember That	2023	
Mickey and Friends Trick or Treats	2023	
Wickedly Sweet: A Descendants Short Story	2024	
Shuffle of Love: A Descendants Short Story	2025	
Prep & Landing: The Snowball Protocol	2025	

==== Preschool (Disney Jr.) ====
Title	Distributor	Date(s) aired	Notes
Playhouse Disney
Animal Stories	HIT Entertainment	1999–2002	Short series
BB's Music Time	Buena Vista Television	2002–2007	Short series
Bear in the Big Blue House	Buena Vista Television	1997–2007	
Behind the Ears	Disney-ABC Domestic Television	2007–2009	Short series
The Book of Pooh	Buena Vista Television	2001–2005	
Breakfast with Bear	Buena Vista Television	2005–2006	
Bunnytown	Disney-ABC Domestic Television	2007–2008	
Can You Teach My Alligator Manners?	Disney-ABC Domestic Television	2008–2011	Short series
Captain Carlos	Buena Vista Television	2005–2007	Short series
Charlie and Lola	BBC Worldwide	2005–2010	
Choo Choo Soul	Buena Vista Television	2006–2011	Short series
Circle Time	Buena Vista Television	1997–2002	Short series
Dan Zanes House Party	Buena Vista Television	2006–2011	Short series
The Doodlebops	Cookie Jar Entertainment	2005–2009	
Feeling Good with JoJo	Buena Vista Television	2006–2009	Short series
Felix and the Flying Machine	Buena Vista Television	2004–2006	Short series
Frankenguy & The Professor	Buena Vista Television	1997–2002	Short series
Go Baby!	Buena Vista Television	2005–2007	Short series
Handy Manny	Disney-ABC Domestic Television	2006–2011	
Handy Manny's School for Tools	Disney-ABC Domestic Television	2010–2011	Short series
Happy Monster Band	Disney-ABC Domestic Television	2007–2011	Short series
Here Come the 123s	Disney Music Group	2007–2008	Short series
Here Come the ABCs	Disney Music Group	2005–2008	Short series
Higglytown Heroes	Buena Vista Television	2004–2009	
Johnny and the Sprites	Disney-ABC Domestic Television	2007–2009; 2012–2013	
JoJo's Circus	Buena Vista Television	2003–2009	
The Koala Brothers	Spellbound Entertainment	2004–2008	
Little Einsteins	Disney-ABC Domestic Television	2005–2014	
Lou and Lou: Safety Patrol	Buena Vista Television	2006–2011	Short series
Madeline	Buena Vista Television/DIC Entertainment	1997–2005	
Magic Drawings	Buena Vista Television	1997–2001	Short series
Manners with Max	Buena Vista Television	2003–2006	Short series
Mickey's Letter Time	Buena Vista Television	2002–2004	Short series
Mickey Mouse Clubhouse	Buena Vista Television	2006–2016	Short series
Microscopic Milton	Foothill Entertainment	1997–2002	Short series
Mini Movies	Buena Vista Television	2001–2002	
My Friends Tigger & Pooh	Disney-ABC Domestic Television	2007–2010	
Ooh, Aah & You	Disney-ABC Domestic Television	2007–2011	Short series
Out of the Box	Buena Vista Television	1998–2005	
Pablo the Little Red Fox	HIT Entertainment	1999–2002	Short series
PB&J Otter	Buena Vista Television	1998–2005; 2012–2013	
Poky and Friends	Golden Books Family Entertainment	1999–2001	Short series
Project Playtime	Buena Vista Television	2003–2007	Short series
Rolie Polie Olie	Nelvana/Buena Vista Television	1998–2006	
Sharing Time	Buena Vista Television	2002–2005	Short series
Stanley	Buena Vista Television	2001–2008; 2012–2013	
This Is Daniel Cook.	Distribution 360	2005–2007	Short series
This Is Emily Yeung.	Distribution 360	2007–2009	Short series
Use Your Noodle Time	Buena Vista Television	2002–2004	Short series
Where Is Warehouse Mouse?	Disney-ABC Domestic Television	2009–2010	Short series
Whiffle and Fuzz	Disney-ABC Domestic Television	2008–2011	Short series
The Wiggles	ABC Commercial	2002–2009	
Disney Junior/Disney Jr.
Alice's Wonderland Bakery	Disney-ABC Domestic Television	2022	
The Chicken Squad	Disney-ABC Domestic Television	2021–2022	
Doc McStuffins	Disney-ABC Domestic Television	2012–2020	
Fancy Nancy	Disney-ABC Domestic Television	2018–2020	
Firebuds	Disney-ABC Domestic Television	2022–2025	
Jake and the Never Land Pirates	Disney-ABC Domestic Television	2011–2016	
Kindergarten: The Musical	Disney-ABC Domestic Television	2024–2025	
The Lion Guard	Disney-ABC Domestic Television	2016–2019	
Mickey Mouse Funhouse	Disney-ABC Domestic Television	2021–2025	
Mickey and the Roadster Racers/Mickey Mouse Mixed-Up Adventures	Disney-ABC Domestic Television	2017–2020	
Mira, Royal Detective	Disney-ABC Domestic Television	2020–2022	
Muppet Babies	Disney-ABC Domestic Television	2018–2020	
Puppy Dog Pals	Disney-ABC Domestic Television	2017–2022	
The Rocketeer	Disney-ABC Domestic Television	2019–2020	
Sheriff Callie's Wild West	Disney-ABC Domestic Television	2014–2016	
Sofia the First	Disney-ABC Domestic Television	2013–2018	
Star Wars: Young Jedi Adventures	Disney-ABC Domestic Television	2023–2025	
T.O.T.S.	Disney-ABC Domestic Television	2019–2021	
Vampirina	Disney-ABC Domestic Television	2017–2020	

=== Programming from various Disney networks ===
Title	Original channel	Date(s) aired	Note(s)
The 7D	Disney XD	2014; 2016	
Aaron Stone	Disney XD	2009	
Adventures of the Old West	Originally aired	April 30 – June 4, 1995	Variety show
Boy Meets World	ABC	2000 – August 31, 2007; 2014	
Brotherly Love	NBC/The WB	1997–2001	
Buzz Lightyear of Star Command	UPN/ABC	June 5, 2006– May 16, 2008	(Note: Originally aired as part of ABC Kids block)
Dinosaurs	ABC	1997–2001	
Disney's Doug	ABC	1999–2000; 2001–2002	
Donald Duck Presents	Originally aired	September 1, 1983 – November 1, 1985	(Note: Collection of Disney animated shorts.)
Donald's Quack Attack	Originally aired	November 2, 1992 – 2003	(Note: Collection of Disney animated shorts.)
Fillmore!	ABC/Toon Disney	March 8 – September 2, 2003	
Future-Worm!	Disney XD	2016	
Gamer's Guide to Pretty Much Everything	Disney XD	2015–2016	
Good Morning, Mickey!	Originally aired	April 18, 1983 – 1992	
Have a Laugh!	Originally aired	October 26, 2009 – December 2, 2012	
High School Musical: The Musical: The Series	Disney+	2019; (Note: The first episode aired as a preview telecast on Disney Channel simulcast with ABC and Freeform.) 2021	
Honey, I Shrunk the Kids: The TV Show	First-run syndication	2001–2004	
House of Mouse	ABC/Toon Disney	2002– 06	
I'm in the Band	Disney XD	2010	
Jungle Cubs	ABC	1997–2000; 2012–2013	
Kick Buttowski: Suburban Daredevil	Disney XD	2011–2012	
Kickin' It	Disney XD	2011; 2013–2015	
Kirby Buckets	Disney XD	2014–2016	
Lab Rats	Disney XD	2012–2018	
Lab Rats: Elite Force	Disney XD	2016–2017	
Lego Star Wars: The Freemaker Adventures	Disney XD	2016	
The Little Mermaid	CBS	1995–2002; September 5, 2006 – July 2010	
Lloyd in Space	ABC/Toon Disney	2002–2003	
Lunch Box	Originally aired	1989–1995	
Marsupilami	CBS	1994–1995; 1998–1999	
Mickey's Mouse Tracks	Originally aired	1992–2000	
Mighty Med	Disney XD	2013–2015	
The Mouse Factory	Originally aired	May 18, 1986–1990s	
Mouseterpiece Theater	Originally aired	April 18, 1983 – 2000	
Muppets Tonight	ABC	1997–2000	
Music Box	Originally aired	October 1990–1990s	
The Mysterious Benedict Society	Disney+	2022	
The Neighbors	ABC	2012	
Pair of Kings	Disney XD	2010	
Penn Zero: Part-Time Hero	Disney XD	2015	
Pepper Ann	ABC	September 3, 2001- September 8, 2002	
Percy Jackson and the Olympians	Disney+	2025	
Pickle and Peanut	Disney XD	2015–2016	
Raw Toonage	CBS	August 31, 1998	
Recess	ABC/UPN	1999–2000; 2003–2006; August 26, 2008 – July 1, 2010	
Right Now Kapow	Disney XD	2016–2017	
The Santa Clauses	Disney+	2022	
The Sinbad Show	Fox	1994–1995	
Sing Me a Story with Belle	Syndication	1998–2000	
Smart Guy	The WB	1999–2004	
Star Wars: The New Yoda Chronicles	Disney XD	2014	
Star Wars Rebels	Disney XD	2014–2016	
Star Wars: Skeleton Crew	Disney+	2025	
Teamo Supremo	ABC/Toon Disney	2002–2003	
Teacher's Pet	ABC/Toon Disney	2002–2004	
The Torkelsons/Almost Home	NBC	1994–1999	
Tron: Uprising	Disney XD	2012–2013	
Ultimate Spider-Man	Disney XD	2013–2015	
The Weekenders	ABC/UPN/Toon Disney	2003	
W.I.T.C.H.	Jetix	2006	(Note: Co-production.)
The Wuzzles	CBS	1988–1997	
Zeke and Luther	Disney XD	2009	
Zorro	ABC	1983–2002	

=== Acquired programming ===
==== Animated ====
Title	Distributor	Original channel	Date(s) aired	Notes
Anatole	Nelvana	CBS	2002–2003	
Babar the Little Elephant	Nelvana	CBC/Global TV/HBO	1991	
Braceface	Nelvana	Teletoon/Télétoon	2004–2005	
Care Bears	Nelvana	Syndication/ABC	1990–1997	
The Charlie Brown and Snoopy Show	Lee Mendelson/Bill Melendez Productions	CBS	1993–1997	
Curious George	Houghton Mifflin Harcourt/Viacom Enterprises	CBS	1989–1999	(Note: Aired as part of Lunch Box.)
Fraggle Rock: The Animated Series	Jim Henson Productions	NBC	1990–1995	
Gigantosaurus	Cyber Group Studios	Originally aired	2019-2020	
Go Away, Unicorn!	Sonar Entertainment/Nelvana	YTV	2019–2020	
Hotel Transylvania: The Series	Corus Entertainment/Nelvana Enterprises	Teletoon	2017–2021	
Katie and Orbie	Amberwood Entertainment	PTV	1997–2000	
My Little Pony Tales	Claster Television	Originally aired	1992–1997	
New Kids on the Block	DIC Enterprises	ABC	1991–1993	
Octonauts	Silvergate Media	CBeebies	2012–2016	
Paddington Bear	FilmFair	BBC	1989–1991	
Pat the Dog	Superprod	La Trois	2017	
PJ Masks	Entertainment One	Originally aired	2017–2020	
Pound Puppies	Great American Broadcasting	ABC	1990–1991	
The Raccoons	Distribution 360	CBC Television	1985–1992	
Rupert	Nelvana	YTV	2000	
Sabrina: The Animated Series	DIC Entertainment	UPN/ABC	2002–2004	
Shaun the Sheep	Aardman Animations	BBC	2007–2008	
Spot the Dog	Salspot, Ltd.	BBC	1989–2002	
Will Quack Quack	Siriol Animation	S4C	1989–1999	
The Wind in the Willows	Thames	ITV	1984–1990	
Yo-Kai Watch	Dentsu Entertainment USA	TXN (TV Tokyo)	2015	
The ZhuZhus	Nelvana	Originally aired	2016–2017	

==== Comedy ====
Title	Distributor	Original channel	Date(s) aired	Notes
The Adventures of Ozzie and Harriet	The Rick Nelson Company	ABC	1983–1994	
The Baby-Sitters Club	Scholastic Entertainment	HBO	1994–2000	
The Edison Twins	Nelvana	CBC Television	1985–1989	
Good Morning, Miss Bliss	NBC Enterprises	NBC/Originally aired	July 11, 1987 – 1989	
Growing Pains	Warner Bros. Television	ABC	1997–2001	
Holly Hobbie	Cloudco Entertainment	Family Channel	2021–2022	
Jump, Rattle and Roll	Warner Bros. Television	Originally aired	1991–1994	
Just Kidding	N/A	Teletoon/Disney XD	2016	
The Kids of Degrassi Street	DHX Media	CBC	1986–1988	
Life with Derek	Shaftesbury Films	Family Channel	September 18, 2005 – December 31, 2009	
Mr. Young	Nelvana Enterprises/Thunderbird Films	YTV/Disney XD	2011	
My Babysitter's a Vampire	FremantleMedia	Teletoon	2011–2012; 2014; 2016	
Naturally, Sadie	DHX Media	Family Channel	June 2005 – May 27, 2007	
The New Leave It to Beaver	Universal Television	Originally aired/TBS	March 19, 1983 – 1985	
Pup Academy	Air Bud Entertainment	TVOntario	August 26 – December 15, 2019	
Sister, Sister	CBS Television Distribution	ABC/The WB	2002–May 27, 2007	

==== Drama ====
Title	Distributor	Original channel	Date(s) aired	Notes
The Adventures of Rin-Tin-Tin	Columbia TriStar Television Distribution	ABC	1984; 1998–2000	
The Adventures of Sherlock Holmes	Granada Television	ITV	1991–1993	
Almost Never		CBBC	2021	
Avonlea	Sullivan Entertainment	CBC	1990–1997	
Backstage	DHX Media	Family Channel	2016	
Danger Bay		CBC	1985–1996	
Eerie, Indiana	Hearst Television	NBC	1993–1996	
Here's Boomer	Paramount Television	NBC	1986–1990	
The Lodge	Disney EMEA	Disney Channel (UK and Ireland)	2016	
Mako Mermaids	ZDF Enterprises	Eleven	2016	
My Friend Flicka	20th Century Fox Television	CBS	1987–1989	
Ocean Girl	Beyond International Group	Network Ten	1994–1997	
Ready or Not		Showtime	1996–2000	
Spellbinder		Nine Network	1996–1997	
Swiss Family Robinson	Fremantle International/Peter Rodgers Organization	CTV	1991	
Wolfblood	ZDF Enterprises	CBBC	2013–2014	
The Worst Witch	ZDF Enterprises	CBBC	2021–2022	

==== Reality ====
Title	Distributor	Original channel	Date(s) aired	Notes
The Great Christmas Light Fight	FremantleMedia	ABC	2016	

==== Variety ====
Title	Distributor	Original channel	Date(s) aired	Notes
Adventures of the Old West		Originally aired	1994	
Amazing Animals	Partridge Films	Originally aired	1996–2000	
Faerie Tale Theatre		Showtime	1994–1996	
Fraggle Rock	Jim Henson Productions		October 5, 1992–1996	
Groundling Marsh	Portfolio Entertainment		1996–1997	
Kids Incorporated	MGM Television	Syndication	1986–1996	
The Kidsongs Television Show	Warner Bros. Records	Syndication	1990	
Mother Goose Stories	Jim Henson Productions	Originally aired	1990–1996	Live-action preschool
The Muppet Show	ITC Entertainment / Henson Associates Inc.	Syndication	October 5, 1992–1997	
New! Animal World		Originally aired	1984–1985	
Ready Steady Go!	BMG Rights Management	ITV	1989–1991	
Secret Life of Toys	Jim Henson Productions	Originally aired	1994–1996	Live-action preschool
Tall Tales & Legends		Showtime	1992–1996	
Under the Umbrella Tree	Noreen Young Productions	CBC	1990–1997	Live-action preschool

=== Short-form programming ===
Title	Date(s) aired	Note(s)
A Disney Moment	1984–1995	
Music Break	1991–1997	
Discover Magazine	1992–1996	
Ovation	1992–1996	
Making Their Mark	1993–1997	
Inside Out Spotlite	1994–1996	
Joke Time	1996–2002	
Behind the Ears	1997–2000	
Feet Beat	1997–2002	
The Mix-ups	1998	
Pet Stop	1998–2001	
Project Time	1998	
Imagineer That!	1999–2002; 2004–2007	
Express Yourself	2001–2010	
Cool Pets	2002–2005	
Mike's Super Short Show	2002–2007	
Show Your Stuff	2003–2006	
Disney 411	2004–2006	
This Is Daniel Cook.	2004–2007	
Shorty McShorts' Shorts	2006–2007	
Road to High School Musical 2	2007	
Minuscule	2007–2008	
Disney's Really Short Report	2007–2009	
As the Bell Rings	2007–2009	
Disney Channel's 3 Minute Game Show	2007–2010	
Road to The Cheetah Girls: One World	2008	
Brian O'Brian	2008–2009	
Get Connected	2008–2011	
What a Life International!	2009–2010	
Leo Little's Big Show	2009–2011	
TTI: The Time I...	2009–2011	
Take Two with Phineas and Ferb	2010–2011	
This Is Me	2012–2014	
The Coppertop Flop Show	2013–2014	
Dogs Rule! Cats... Not So Much	2014–2016	
Descendants: School of Secrets	2015	
Descendants: Wicked World	2015–2017	
Stuck in the Store	2016	
Bizaardvark Shorts	2017	
Be Your Best Snackdown	2017	
Tangled: Short Cuts	2017–2018	
Inside the Journal: Tangled: The Series	2017–2018	
Mack Chat	2017–2019	
Webby Reacts	2018	
Baymax And	2018	
Country Kids in the City	2018	
Marvel Rising: Initiation	2018	
Big Chibi 6: The Shorts	2018–2019	
Do It Duo	2018–2019	
Coop & Cami Ask the World Shorts	2018–2019	
Disney Quizney	2018–2020	
Baymax Dreams	2018–2021	
Racing Sports Network	2019	
Go Away, Unicorn! Shorts	2019	
Ruby's Gems	2019	
The Truth with Ruth and Ava	2019	
Baymax & Mochi	2019	
Kim Hushable	2019	
Descendants 3: Road to Auradon	2019	
Teen Girl in a Frog World	2019	
Discover Your Voice: Hispanic Heritage Month	2019	
Wild Amphibia	2019	
Big City Greens: Road Trip	2019	
Roll It Back	2019–2020	
Ruth & Ruby's Ultimate Sleepover Challenges	2019–2020	
Shook	2019–2020	
Gabby Duran & the Unsittables: Babysitting 101	2020	
#WAITT	2020	
Miss Tilly's Fun Time TV Minute	2020	
Zombies 2: Wolf Tales	2020	
Descendants: The Planning of the Royal Wedding	2020	
Zombies: Addison's Moonstone Mystery	2020	
In The Nook	2020–2021	
Vlogs from the Bog	2021	
Zombies: Addison's Monster Mystery	2021	
Zombies 3: Alien Stories	2022	
Zombies: The Re-Animated Series Shorts	2023	
Mickey's Christmas Tales	2023	
Moon Girl and Devil Dinosaur: Moon Girl's Lab	2024	

== Programming blocks ==
=== Current ===
- Mickey Mornings (formerly Playhouse Disney and Disney Jr.; April 6, 1997 – present) (rebranded on February 14, 2011, and launched as a channel on March 23, 2012, rebranded as Mickey Mornings in 2020)

=== Former ===
Title	Launched	Defunct	Note(s)
Disney Nighttime	1983	1997	
Disney Channel Discovery	1988	1993	
Mystery Night	1988	1993	
The Best of Hollywood	1988	1995	
Sunday Night Showcase	1988	1995	
Toonin' Tuesday	October 5, 1993	September 1996	
Bonus! Thursday	October 7, 1993	September 1996	
Totally Kids Only	1993	1997	
Triple Feature Friday	October 8, 1993	1997	
Disney Drive-In	October 8, 1994	August 31, 1996	
The Block Party	October 2, 1995	August 1996	
Disney Distractions	1997	2000	
Vault Disney	September 1997	September 16, 2002	
Toon Disney Summer Sundays	Summer 1998	Summer 2000	(Note: "Sneak peek" sampler block of shows from sister channel Toon Disney.)
Zoog Disney	July 26, 1998	September 30, 2002	
So Hot Summer	May 27, 2005	September 4, 2006	
Hauntoberfest	October 1, 2005	October 31, 2006	
Hail to the Holidays	December 1, 2005	December 25, 2006	
Disney Channel Summer	May 25, 2007	September 5, 2016	
Disney Channel Halloween	October 1, 2007	October 31, 2007	
Disney Channel Christmas	December 1, 2007	December 25, 2007	
Totally Rocking Summer	May 24, 2008	September 1, 2008	
Wiztober	May 1, 2008	October 31, 2009	
Santacember	December 1, 2008	December 25, 2009	
It's On	May 29, 2010	September 6, 2010	
October Takeover	October 4, 2010	October 31, 2010	
December Center Event	December 1, 2010	December 25, 2010	
Monstober	October 1, 2011	October 31, 2024	
TOONin' Saturdays	June 18, 2011	September 29, 2012	
Sizzlin Summer	May 27, 2011	September 5, 2011	
Fa-La-La-Lidays	December 1, 2011	January 1, 2025	
JanNEWary	January 1, 2012	January 31, 2014	
Disney Channel Saturday Mornings	October 6, 2012	January 25, 2014	
Disney Replay	April 18, 2013	April 28, 2016	
Disney XD on Disney Channel	September 28, 2013	December 30, 2016	
Dis The Season	November 2016	December 31, 2016	
Get Animated	January 7, 2017	September 2, 2018	
FriYAY!	August 4, 2017	August 25, 2017	
31 Nights of Halloween	October 1, 2017	October 31, 2018	
25 Days of Christmas	December 1, 2017	December 25, 2018	
Disney Channel GO!	May 26, 2018	September 3, 2018	
Animation Cram Session	September 8, 2018	June 15, 2019	
Commercial Free Weekend Mornings	June 22, 2019	February 2020	
YADIRF	September 13, 2019	April 10, 2020	
Commercial Free Nights	January 6, 2020	August 30, 2020	
Disney Channel Halloween House Party	October 1, 2020	October 31, 2020	
Holidays Unwrapped	December 1, 2020	December 31, 2020	
Halfway to Halloween	May 1, 2021	April 28, 2024	
Surprise! It's Christmas...Again?!	July 11, 2021		
Calling All the Monsters	October 1, 2021	November 1, 2023	
This Is How We Holiday	November 27, 2021	December 31, 2021	

=== Movies ===
Title	Launched	Defunct	Note(s)
Zoog Movie	2001	2002	
DCOM & Dessert	April 5, 2021	May 24, 2021	

== See also ==
- List of Disney Channel original films
- ABC Kids
- DisneyNow
- List of Canadian programs broadcast by Disney Channel
- List of programs broadcast by Disney Jr.
- List of programs broadcast by Disney XD
