= Walt Disney Television =

Disney's original/former television production company

- Formerly: Walt Disney Pictures Television Division (1983–1988)
- Type: Division
- Industry: Television production
- Predecessor: Walt Disney Productions (TV industry)
- Founded: April 18, 1983; 43 years ago
- Defunct: 2003; 23 years ago
- Fate: Absorbed into the first incarnation of Touchstone Television; Walt Disney Television Animation spun off as a standalone subsidiary
- Successors: 20th Television; The second iteration of Walt Disney Television (currently Disney Entertainment Television); Disney Television Animation (as a standalone subsidiary); Disney Television Studios
- Headquarters: Burbank, California, U.S.
- Products: Television shows and films
- Parent: Walt Disney Productions (1983–86); Walt Disney Pictures (1986-94); Walt Disney Television and Telecommunications (1994–96); The Walt Disney Studios (1996–99); ABC Entertainment Television Group (1999–2003)

The first and original incarnation of Walt Disney Television, formerly Walt Disney Pictures Television Division, was an American production company and the original/former television production division of the Walt Disney Company, which was active from April 18, 1983, to 2003. Productions from this division were broadcast mostly on Disney Channel, Disney Junior, Disney XD and ABC. The majority of the productions of this division are a plethora of animated series and a notable live-action series named Smart Guy, the latter which ran for three seasons on The WB from 1997 to 1999.

In 2003, its animation division, then known as Walt Disney Television Animation (currently just Disney Television Animation) spun-out as its own subsidiary within the larger Disney conglomerate, with an acquired production company, It's a Laugh Productions, taking over its operations for live-action productions. Walt Disney Television itself was absorbed into the first incarnation of Touchstone Television (later renamed as ABC Studios in 2007 and merged with ABC Signature Studios to form ABC Signature in 2020, now 20th Television). Following the completed acquisition of 21st Century Fox in 2019, Disney returned to using this name for its combined television segment for 2 years before they subtly changed name to Disney General Entertainment Television (now Disney Entertainment Television), with Disney Television Studios established on May 15, 2019.

== Background ==
While initially not interested in television back in the 1930s, Walt Disney changed his mind seeing television at least as a promotional tool. Most studios were generating revenue by selling off their permanent television rights to their films made before 1948, while Disney held on to the company's film rights. Thus Walt Disney Productions was the first of the film industry, which saw television as an adversary, to enter the television production field. Walt Disney Productions did an hour-long special on Christmas Day 1950 for NBC then in 1951 for CBS. The specials used Disney film clips, short films and promoted the upcoming Alice in Wonderland theatrical film. Both specials had excellent ratings. The networks pursued Disney to do a full series for them. Disney used this interest in a series to request funding for Disneyland, with the newly merged American Broadcasting-Paramount Theatres taking the deal for the airing of the Walt Disney's Disneyland anthology series in American Broadcasting Company (ABC). The "Operation Undersea" episode of the series garnered Disney its first Emmy Award. The series quickly became ABC's first series to hit the top 20 in ratings.

Disney's entry into television impacted the television industry as the Disney anthology show marked a move from live to filmed delivery of television shows. Filming made it possible for higher production value. Also, a couple of the major film studios copied the show's format with MGM Parade and Warner Bros. Presents. Both shows did not last.

With the series' "Davy Crockett" episodes generating high sale of merchandise, Disney Productions produced The Mickey Mouse Club, the first youth audience television program and a daily afternoon show. In 1957, Disney was producing the series Zorro. It lasted until 1959. In 1961, Disney severed its terms with ABC and moved its weekly program to NBC, where it stayed for nearly 20 years until 1981. For years, its anthology series was Disney's lone program on network television. In 1972, it collaborated with the NBC owned-and-operated stations group to launch The Mouse Factory. It didn't last long, and it was canned in 1973.

In 1975, Disney launched a partnership with SFM Media Service Corporation to distribute The Mickey Mouse Club onto syndication starting in 1975, leading up to new episodes in 1977.

In 1980, Disney severed its exclusive deal with NBC, and jumped into line as a production company for television programs. The following year, it signed a production agreement with CBS to bring anthology series to the network, and the addition of producing new original programs. Disney had broken its 23-year streak of producing anthology series only in order to produce its first TV show since Zorro's cancellation in 1959, Herbie the Love Bug, which only lasted one season on CBS. This was followed by three short-lived sitcoms produced Gun Shy, Small & Frye and Zorro and Son, which also aired on CBS, but never lasted long, which led to the demise of the anthology series in 1983.

== History ==
Walt Disney Television was formed in 1983, as the Walt Disney Pictures Television Division, the name was later shortened to Walt Disney Television in 1988. Until 1983, Disney shows were aired under the banner of the parent company, then named Walt Disney Productions. Disney made its firsts in 1985, which are Wildside, which is produced under the Touchstone Films label (later Touchstone Television, ABC Studios, and ABC Signature), and two animated cartoons The Wuzzles on CBS and Adventures of the Gummi Bears on NBC.

In August 1994, with the departure of Walt Disney Studios chairman Jeffrey Katzenberg, its filmed entertainment business was split into two, with Walt Disney Pictures continuing with motion pictures and the newly created Walt Disney Television and Telecommunications for television under Joe Roth and Richard Frank respectively.

At the time when Disney merged with Capital Cities/ABC, Disney Television was a part of Walt Disney Television and Telecommunications (WDTT). With the retirement of WDTT president Dennis Hightower in June 1996 and ongoing post-merger reorganization, Walt Disney Television (along with its Animation unit) was transferred back to The Walt Disney Studios.

The Walt Disney Television group, upon the departure of its president Dean Valentine in September 1997, was split into two units: Walt Disney Television (WDT) and Walt Disney Network Television (WDNT), reporting to Walt Disney Studios chairman Joe Roth. WDT would be headed by Charles Hirschhorn as president and consisted of Disney Telefilms for ABC, the-direct-to video-unit, and Walt Disney Television Animation. WDNT would handle primetime programming, headed by David Neuman as president. Neuman was also named president of Touchstone Television. In March 1998, WDNT was placed under Buena Vista TV Productions, a newly formed group under chairman Lloyd Braun, along with Touchstone Television. in June 1998, Neuman left as did his top two executives due to this reorganization.

In late 1999, Walt Disney Television Studios (also called Buena Vista Television Group or Buena Vista Television Productions), were transferred from the Disney Studios to the ABC Television Network to merge with ABC's primetime division, ABC Entertainment, forming the ABC Entertainment Television Group. Walt Disney Television Studios was later merged into Touchstone Television (became ABC Studios in 2007 and ABC Signature in 2020 before it was folded into 20th Television in 2024) in 2000, while its name continued to be used on new cartoons from Walt Disney Television Animation (now Disney Television Animation, which is now a unit of Disney Kids & Family (formerly Disney Channels Worldwide and then Disney Branded Television)) until 2003, when Disney later merged the television production company with the television animation division and Touchstone Television.

== Names ==
- Walt Disney Pictures Television Division (1983–1985)
- Walt Disney Pictures Television (1985–1986)
- Walt Disney Television (1985–2003; become the then-current name of television asset divisions in 2019 until 2021)
- Walt Disney Pictures and Television (1988–2007)

== Filmography ==
=== Television series ===
Title	Year	Network	Co-production
Good Morning, Mickey!	1983–1992	Disney Channel	Walt Disney Productions
Donald Duck Presents	1983–1992	Disney Channel	Walt Disney Productions
You and Me Kid	1983–1986	Disney Channel	Walt Disney Productions
Welcome to Pooh Corner	1983–1986	Disney Channel	Walt Disney Productions
Contraption	1983–1988	Disney Channel	ACME Game Show, Inc.
Zorro and Son	1983	CBS	
Dumbo's Circus	1985–1986	Disney Channel	Walt Disney Productions
Sidekicks	1986–1987	ABC; Disney Channel	Motown Productions
Videopolis	1987–1989	Disney Channel	
Great Expectations	1989	Disney Channel	HTV; Primetime Television Ltd. Tesauro Television
Brand New Life	1989–1990	NBC	NBC Productions
The 100 Lives of Black Jack Savage	1991	NBC	Stephen J. Cannell Productions
Dinosaurs	1991–1994	ABC	Michael Jacobs Productions; Jim Henson Productions
The Torkelsons	1991–1992	NBC	Michael Jacobs Productions; Walt Disney Television (season 1); Touchstone Television (season 2)
Adventures in Wonderland	1992–1995	Disney Channel	Betty Productions
The Secret of Lost Creek	1992	Disney Channel	
Bill Nye the Science Guy	1993–1998	PBS	KCTS Seattle; Rabbit Ears Productions
Sing Me a Story with Belle	1995–1997	Syndication	Patrick Davidson Productions
Brotherly Love	1995–1997	NBC; The WB	Witt/Thomas Productions; Touchstone Television (season 1); Walt Disney Television (season 2)
Smart Guy	1997–1999	The WB	de Passe Entertainment; Danny Kallis Productions
Honey, I Shrunk the Kids: The TV Show	1997–2000	Syndication	Plymouth Productions; St. Clare Entertainment

=== Animated series ===
All animated series below are co-produced with Disney Television Animation.

Title	Year	Network	Co-production
The Wuzzles	1985	CBS	
Adventures of the Gummi Bears	1985–1991	NBC; ABC	
DuckTales	1987–1990	Syndication	
The New Adventures of Winnie the Pooh	1988–1991	ABC	
Chip 'n Dale: Rescue Rangers	1989–1990	Syndication	
TaleSpin	1990–1992	Syndication	
Darkwing Duck	1991–1992	Syndication; ABC	
Goof Troop	1992–1993	Syndication; ABC	
The Little Mermaid	1992–1994	CBS	
Raw Toonage	1992	CBS	
Bonkers	1993–1995	Syndication	
Marsupilami	1993–1994	CBS	
Aladdin	1994–1995	Syndication; CBS	
Gargoyles	1994–1997	Syndication; ABC	
The Shnookums and Meat Funny Cartoon Show	1995	Syndication	
Timon & Pumbaa	1995–1999	Syndication; CBS; Toon Disney	
Quack Pack	1996	Syndication	
Mighty Ducks: The Animated Series	1996–1997	Syndication; ABC	
Doug	1996–1999	ABC	Jumbo Pictures
Jungle Cubs	1996–1998	ABC	
101 Dalmatians: The Series	1997–1998	Syndication; ABC	Jumbo Pictures
Recess	1997–2001	ABC	Paul & Joe Productions
Pepper Ann	1997–2000	ABC	
PB&J Otter	1998–2000	Playhouse Disney	Jumbo Pictures
Hercules	1998–1999	Syndication; ABC	
Mickey Mouse Works	1999–2000	ABC	
The Weekenders	2000–2004	ABC; Toon Disney	
Buzz Lightyear of Star Command	2000–2001	UPN; ABC	Pixar Animation Studios
Teacher's Pet	2000–2002	ABC; Toon Disney	
House of Mouse	2001–2003	ABC; Toon Disney	
Lloyd in Space	2001–2004	ABC; Toon Disney	Paul & Joe Productions
The Legend of Tarzan	2001–2003	UPN	
Teamo Supremo	2002–2004	ABC; Toon Disney	
Kim Possible	2002–2007	Disney Channel; ABC	
Fillmore!	2002–2004	ABC; Toon Disney	
Lilo & Stitch: The Series	2003–2006	Disney Channel; ABC	

== Disney Telefilms ==
Disney Telefilms (DTF), or Walt Disney Telefilms, was a TV film production company and a division of Walt Disney Television. The division provided movies for The Wonderful World of Disney.

=== History ===
With the purchase of Capital Cities/ABC Inc., Disney CEO Michael Eisner wanted to relaunch The Wonderful World of Disney on ABC in 1996 with a movie franchise. Walt Disney Telefilms was formed to produce films for the anthology TV series by 1995. Leah Keith was transferred from Walt Disney Pictures that year to the telefilms division.

Hollywood Pictures executive vice president Charles Hirschhorn oversaw Walt Disney Telefilms as president in June 1996, reporting to Dean Valentine, president of Walt Disney Television and Walt Disney Television Animation, for the Telefilms unit. Mike Karz, a former vice president of Mandeville Films, signed a first look deal with the company through his shingle, Karz Entertainment, based at Walt Disney Studios in May 1997. On September 28, 1997, the division launched the anthology show. The division produced 17 films in nine months while it only expected to provide 16 movies. On October 5, 1997, Disney Telefilms' first production, Toothless, debuted on The Wonderful World of Disney.

The Walt Disney Television group, upon the departure of Dean Valentine in September 1997, was split into two units: Walt Disney Television (WDT) and Walt Disney Network Television (WDNT). WDT would be headed by Hirschhorn as president and consisted of Disney Telefilms and Walt Disney Television Animation, including Disney MovieToons/Disney Video Premiere. Leah Keith and Peter Green were promoted to production vice presidents for the division in March 1998.

=== Filmography ===
Title	Release date	Production company(ies)	Notes	source
==== 1997 ====
Toothless	October 5, 1997		1st Disney Telefilms movie	
Tower of Terror	October 26, 1997	ZM Productions	1st theme park attraction movie	
Rodgers & Hammerstein's Cinderella	November 2, 1997			
Angels in the Endzone	November 9, 1997	Caravan Pictures		
Oliver Twist	November 16, 1997		A retelling of the Dickens tale starring Richard Dreyfuss and Elijah Wood	
The Love Bug	November 30, 1997		Remake of the 1968 film	
Flash	December 21, 1997			
==== 1998 ====
Principal Takes a Holiday	January 4, 1998			
Ruby Bridges	January 18, 1998		A docu-drama at New Orleans all-white school, which takes in its first African American girl student base	
The Garbage Picking Field Goal Kicking Philadelphia Phenomenon	February 15, 1998		Tony Danza as a trash man who would become a kicker for the Philadelphia Eagles	
Goldrush: A Real Life Alaskan Adventure	March 8, 1998			
Miracle at Midnight	May 17, 1998	Davis Entertainment	Starring Mia Farrow, Sam Waterston and Justin Whalin, a fact-based story in which the Danish save thousands from the Nazi	

== See also ==
- Disney Television Animation
- Walt Disney Television, then-current television division using former production company name
- Jetix Animation Concepts
- List of Disney television series
