= Shawn Phelan =

American actor

- Born: Shawn Michael Phelan; January 7, 1975; Stoughton, Massachusetts, U.S.
- Died: September 27, 1998 (aged 23); Houston, Texas, U.S.
- Years active: 1989–1993

Shawn Michael Phelan (January 7, 1975 – September 27, 1998) was an American television and film actor.

== Early life and acting career ==
Phelan was born in Stoughton, Massachusetts, to Dan and Bonnie Phelan. He moved to Houston, Texas, with his mother and grandmother Beverly at the age of seven. He began his acting career in various stage productions at the Unicorn Theatre in Houston at age 9. His first national television role was in an episode of the NBC sitcom Sister Kate in 1989 at the age of 13 and followed by small roles in television series such as The Wonder Years, Family Matters and Grand. Phelan appeared in "The Virtual Murder" television episode of Murder, She Wrote alongside Angela Lansbury in 1993, an episode that was ahead of its time speculating on the future of virtual reality. His first studio film role was in the 1991 drama Toy Soldiers opposite actors Sean Astin, Wil Wheaton and Louis Gossett Jr.

== Automobile accident and death ==
On March 29, 1994, at age 19, Phelan was involved in an automobile collision when his Toyota Corolla was broadsided three blocks from his home. He suffered a traumatic brain injury which left him comatose for over four years. Phelan died on September 27, 1998, at the age of 23.

== Selected filmography ==
- Murder She Wrote ("A Virtual Murder") (1993)
- Telling Secrets (1993)
- Do Not Bring That Python in the House (1992)
- Breaking the Rules (1992)
- The Secret of Lost Creek (1992)
- Miles from Nowhere (1992)
- Toy Soldiers (1991)
- Caroline? (1990)
- The All New Mickey Mouse Club (unaired pilot) (1989)
