= Contraption (game show) =

- Presented by: Ralph Harris
- Narrated by: Miranda Fredricks
- Country of origin: United States
- No. of seasons: 5
- No. of episodes: 40

Production
- Producer: Walt Disney Television
- Running time: 30 minutes
- Production companies: ACME Game Show, Inc.

Original release
- Network: Disney Channel
- Release: April 18, 1983 – January 9, 1988

Contraption is an American game show and one of the original programs on the Disney Channel, which ran from April 18, 1983 (when the channel launched) to January 9, 1988 and reruns aired from March 8 to October 25, 1989. The show was hosted by actor/comedian Ralph Harris and announced by Miranda Fredricks.

== Gameplay ==
Two teams of three kids competed. Each team had three passports, each with a different area of the set written on it; "Books", "Animals", or "Heroes and Villains". Each kid would hold a different passport; this would determine which kid played in which round.

=== Round 1 ===
To begin, the two kids that had the "Books" passports went to that area of the stage. They would then watch a two-minute clip of a Disney film based on a book. Each kid was given two questions based on that clip. Each right answer won a "Contraptile", a yellow square translucent piece of plastic with a hole in the center.

After the two questions, the two kids played the "Jungle Boat Race". They would pedal a recumbent trike (fashioned to look like a boat) down a track, and the first one to knock over a pole at the end would win two Contraptiles. The runner-up would receive one Contraptile.

=== Round 2 ===
The next round would be played between the two kids who had the "Animals" passports. They would watch a clip of a Disney film focusing on animal characters. Again, each kid was asked two questions about the clip, worth one Contraptile each.

The two kids would then play "Wheels Of Fire". Similar to the Hamster Wheel on Double Dare, each kid would get inside a large wheel and run inside it to move it across a track. Again, the first to knock over a pole at the finish line won two Contraptiles, while the runner up received one.

=== Round 3 ===
The next round would be played between the two with the "Heroes & Villains" passports. A clip of a Disney film, involving the heroes and villains of the film, was shown. This time, each kid was asked three questions about the clip, worth one Contraptile each.

The two would then play "Magic Carpets". This game was the same as the Jungle Boat Race, but the trikes used here were arm powered instead of leg powered. The same scoring applied.

=== Round 4 ===
The final round involved every member of each team, at the "Magic" area of the stage. A clip from a Disney film involving magical powers was shown. Each team was then asked three questions about the clip, on which they could confer. Each right answer won five Contraptiles.

After this round, each team's Contraptiles were counted. The team with the most Contraptiles won the game; both teams won prizes, and the winners received a Grand Prize.

Preceded by Welcome to Pooh Corner	Disney Channel Original Series	Succeeded by Donald Duck Presents
