= List of Canadian programs broadcast by Disney Channel =

This is a list of television programs currently broadcast (in first-run or reruns), scheduled to be broadcast or formerly broadcast on Disney Channel (formerly "The Disney Channel"), that are of Canadian origin.

== Drama series ==
Title	Distributor	Original channel	Date(s) aired	Notes
The Adventures of Shirley Holmes		YTV	1997	
Avonlea	Sullivan Entertainment	CBC	1990–97	
Backstage	WildBrain	Family	2016	
Danger Bay		CBC	1985–96	
Ready or Not		Showtime	1996–2000	
Swiss Family Robinson	FremantleMedia/Peter Rodgers Organization	CTV	1991	
So Weird	Buena Vista Television	Disney Channel	1999–2001	

== Comedy programming ==
Title	Distributor	Original channel	Date(s) aired	Notes
Life with Derek	Shaftesbury Films	Family	2005-09	
Naturally, Sadie	Decode Entertainment	Family	2005-07	

== Action programming ==
Title	Distributor	Original channel	Date(s) aired	Notes
My Babysitter's a Vampire	Fresh TV	Teletoon	2011-12; 2014; 2016	

== Live-action preschool programming ==
Title	Distributor	Original channel	Date(s) aired	Notes
Fraggle Rock	The Jim Henson Company	HBO	1992–96	
Groundling Marsh	Portfolio Entertainment	YTV	1996–97	
Under the Umbrella Tree	Noreen Young Productions	CBC	1990–97	

== Animated series ==
Title	Distributor	Original channel	Date(s) aired	Notes
Anatole	Nelvana	CBS	2002–03	
Babar	Nelvana	CBC/Global TV/HBO	1991	
Braceface	Nelvana	Teletoon/Télétoon	2004–05	
Care Bears	Nelvana	Syndication/ABC	1990–97	
Hotel Transylvania: The Series	Nelvana	Teletoon	2017–20	
Katie and Orbie	Amberwood Entertainment	PTV	1997-2000	
The Raccoons	Distribution 360	CBC	1985–92	
Rupert	Nelvana	YTV	2000	
Sabrina: The Animated Series	WildBrain	UPN/ABC	2002-2004	
Sabrina's Secret Life	WildBrain	Syndication	2003–04	
The ZhuZhus	Nelvana	YTV	2016-17	

== Playhouse Disney/Disney Junior Programming ==
Title	Distributor	Original channel	Date(s) aired	Notes
The Doodlebops	WildBrain	CBC	2005-2009	
Madeline	WildBrain	Disney Channel	1997-2005	
Rolie Polie Olie	Nelvana	CBC	1998-2006	
This is Daniel Cook	Distribution 360	Treehouse	2005-2007	
This is Emily Yeung	Distribution 360	Treehouse	2007-2009	

== See also ==
- List of programs broadcast by Disney Channel
- List of programs broadcast by Disney Jr.
- List of programs broadcast by Disney XD
- List of Disney Channel original films
- ABC Kids
- DisneyNow
