= Welcome to Pooh Corner =

- Second Welcome to Pooh Corner title card
- Genre: Children's television series; Puppetry; Educational
- Starring: Joe Giamalva; Patty Maloney; Ronald Mangham; Norman Merrill, Jr.; Mark Sawyer; Frank Groby; Sharon Baird; Shelagh Garren; Peter Risch
- Voices of: Hal Smith; Will Ryan; Ron Gans; Phil Baron; Diana Hale; Kim Christianson; Robin Frederick
- Narrated by: Laurie Main
- Country of origin: United States
- No. of seasons: 3
- No. of episodes: 120

Production
- Running time: 30 minutes
- Production companies: Left Coast Television; Walt Disney Pictures Television Division

Original release
- Network: The Disney Channel
- Release: April 18, 1983 – May 30, 1986

Welcome to Pooh Corner is an American live-action/puppet television series that aired on Disney Channel, featuring the characters from the Winnie the Pooh universe portrayed by actors in human-sized puppet suits, except Roo, who was originally a traditional puppet. The animatronic costumes used for the characters were created by Alchemy II, Inc., headed by Ken Forsse who later created Teddy Ruxpin. The show was first aired on April 18, 1983, the day The Disney Channel was launched. Its timeslot for its early run was at 8:30 a.m. Eastern/Pacific Time, making it the third program of The Disney Channel's 16 (later 18) hour programming day. Reruns of the show aired on The Disney Channel until May 30, 1997.

Hal Smith, Will Ryan, and Laurie Main were the only three actors from the original four Pooh shorts to reprise their roles here (Smith, who had voiced Owl ever since the beginning of Disney's Winnie the Pooh franchise, had recently replaced Sterling Holloway as the voice of Pooh; Ryan had provided Rabbit's voice in the 1983 short Winnie the Pooh and a Day for Eeyore, replacing Junius Matthews and voiced Tigger in a rare instance where the character is voiced neither by Paul Winchell or Jim Cummings; and Main was the narrator for Winnie the Pooh and a Day for Eeyore, replacing Sebastian Cabot). The show's title derives from the second Winnie the Pooh storybook, The House at Pooh Corner.

== Format ==
This series is the only incarnation in the history of Disney's incarnations of Winnie the Pooh in which the viewer could actually see the narrator aside from only hearing his voice. He would present each episode. The show would start off with him greeting the viewers with, "Welcome to Pooh Corner", and then relate what he was talking about to an event that occurred in the Hundred Acre Wood, the home of the Pooh characters, and would then proceed to read from a book entitled Welcome to Pooh Corner, narrating the episode acted out by the characters. The action was filmed before a blue screen, rather than using traditional sets (the same technique was used for Dumbo's Circus, another live-action/puppet series that ran on The Disney Channel).

Since the show was produced for The Disney Channel before it began airing commercials, there were no commercial breaks. As a result, the show lasted a full thirty minutes. The main story ran about twenty minutes followed by two shorter segments. The first segment was a sing-along music video featuring one of nine songs, used over and over throughout the show's run. These songs were written by the Oscar-winning Sherman Brothers who had provided the majority of Disney's Winnie the Pooh music over the years. The Sherman Brothers also wrote the show's theme song, using the music from the original Winnie the Pooh theme song from The Many Adventures of Winnie the Pooh, albeit with a slightly altered tempo.

The last segment of the show was a presentational arts and crafts demonstration that took place at the Thoughtful Spot. One of the cast members would speak to the narrator, looking directly into the camera, while they showed the viewers at home how to make something.

When the series first started out, the narrator was seen sitting in a small library. As the series progressed, he moved into a small playroom, which, eventually, is seen with plush versions of Pooh and his friends in the background.

== Episodes ==
=== Holiday specials ===
1. Pooh Corner Thanksgiving (1983)
2. Christmas at Pooh Corner (1983)
3. Pooh's Funny Valentine's Day (1984)
4. Because It's Halloween (1984)
5. Christmas Is For Sharing (1984)

=== Educational specials ===
- Too Smart for Strangers – a 1985 TV special (which was also released on home video), where Pooh and his friends tell the viewers about strangers and molestation and what to do. During later years, the special gained massive controversy over its mature themes, including one infamous scene where Pooh discretely discusses about child grooming and sexual harassment. The live-action segments of Too Smart for Strangers were directed by Ron Underwood.
- Pooh's Great School Bus Adventure – a fifteen-minute 16mm educational film produced in 1986, where the characters explain the importance of school bus safety.
- One and Only You – a ten-minute 16mm educational film produced in 1989, where the characters explain about being yourself.
- Responsible Persons – a ten-minute 16mm educational film produced in 1989, where Pooh and friends demonstrate taking responsibility for your actions.

== Cast ==
=== With ===
- Laurie Main - Mr. Narrator

=== Voice cast ===
- Hal Smith – Winnie the Pooh and Owl
- Will Ryan – Rabbit and Tigger
- Ron Gans – Eeyore
- Phil Baron – Piglet
- Diana Hale – Kanga
- Kim Christianson – Roo

=== Puppet performers ===
- Sharon Baird (Eeyore)
- Shelagh Garren
- Joe Giamalva (Pooh)
- Clancy Gorewit
- Frank Groby
- Patty Maloney (Piglet)
- Ron Mangham (Tigger)
- Norman Merrill Jr.
- Peter Risch (Roo)
- Mark Sawyer

== Music ==
=== Music composers ===
- Will Ryan
- Phil Baron

=== Songs ===
The first few songs were written by the Academy Award-winning songwriting duo of Richard M. Sherman and Robert B. Sherman. The Sherman Brothers also wrote the majority of the well-known songs from Disney's Winnie the Pooh series, including "The Wonderful Thing about Tiggers" and "Heffalumps and Woozles" from the original 1960s shorts, and, in 2000, wrote the score to The Tigger Movie.

Other songs were written by Robin Frederick, Dan Crow, Galen Brandt, Phil Baron and Will Ryan.

- "Welcome to Pooh Corner Theme Song"
- "Try a Little Something New" (Rabbit's Song); is sung by Rabbit. It is about how Rabbit deals with his "naughty habits" of 'mundanity and stagnation.' The song was re-written for the later 1999 VHS production, Sing a Song with Pooh Bear, in which Tigger and Owl perform it as a duet.
- "Just Say, 'Yes I Can' " (Eeyore's Song)
- "You're the Only You" (Tigger's song); is his personal "theme song" specifically for this series, as opposed to his widely accepted theme song in reference to the Pooh franchise as a whole, "The Wonderful Thing about Tiggers" (also written by the Sherman Brothers). In the song, he asserts that "the wonderful thing about Tiggers is: I'm the only one".
- "I Hum to Myself" (Piglet's Song); is about how Piglet deals with his fears by humming to himself.
- "The Right Side" (Pooh's Song); was originally written in 1961 or 1962 as part of the Sherman Brothers' score for Mary Poppins. In the song, Pooh explains how he makes the best out of a bad situation.
- "Responsible Persons" (Owl's Song)
- "Be a Buddy, Be a Pal" (Tigger and Roo's Song)
- "Please and Thank You" (Pooh and Piglet's Song)
- "Trees" (Tigger and Owl's Song)
- "Tiggers Go Up and Down" (Tigger's Song)
- "Ta Ta For Now" (Tigger's Song) (sometimes used in place of the Closing Song)
- "Welcome to Pooh Corner Closing Song"

=== "A Part of Me" ===
Sometimes, if an episode ended a few minutes early, a certain character would sing a song entitled "A Part of Me", which was written by one of the voice actors, Phil Baron. The song depicts the importance of a certain body part that each character was singing about:

- "Eyes" (Owl)
- "Ears" (Pooh)
- "Feet" (Piglet)
- "Nose" (Tigger)
- "Mouth" (Eeyore)
- "Hands" (Rabbit)

== Home media ==
=== VHS releases ===
==== US releases ====
Six VHS tapes were released by Walt Disney Home Video in the mid-1980s for the then new video home rental market. Each tape contained four episodes.

- Volume One contains the episodes "You Need A Friend", "Doing What I Do Best", "The Pooh Scouts" and "Brighten Your Corner".
- Volume Two contains the episodes "Safety First", "Rabbit Learns to Share", "The Great Outdoors" and "Surprise, Surprise".
- Volume Three contains the episodes "Piglet Pride", "Roo's Great Adventure", "Eeyore Talks to Himself" and "Snow Falls On Pooh Corner".
- Volume Four contains the episodes "Hello, Hello There", "Practice Makes Perfect", "The Old Swimming Hole" and "Pooh Makes a Trade".
- Volume Five contains the episodes "A Bicycle Built for Five", "My Echo and I", "Pooh Learns to Remember" and "Wishing".
- Volume Six contains the episodes "Don't Quit", "Holiday for Pooh Bear", "Pooh Builds a Bee House" and "Piglet Lends a Helping Hand".

==== UK releases ====
The show was also released on VHS in the United Kingdom as part of a six-volume set which also each featured an episode of Good Morning, Mickey!, Donald Duck Presents, The Mouse Factory and Mousercise. Each tape contained one episode of Welcome to Pooh Corner.

- Volume One contains the episode "Eeyore Joins the Band".
- Volume Two contains the episode "Spaghetti, Spaghetti, Spaghetti".
- Volume Three contains the episode "A Bicycle Built for Five".
- Volume Four contains the episode "Piglet's Slumber Party".
- Volume Five contains the episode "Eeyore's Costume Party".
- Volume Six contains the episode "Handyman Tigger".
- Volume Seven contains the episode "Do It Now".
- First Christmas Volume contains the special "Christmas at Pooh Corner"

=== DVD releases ===
- Disney Safety Hits Vol. 2 (Pooh's Great School Bus Adventure & Too Smart for Strangers)

== See also ==
- Sesame Street

Preceded by You and Me Kid	Disney Channel Original Series	Succeeded by Contraption
