= Sonny Melendrez =

American radio/TV personality

- Born: 1946 (age 79–80); Silver City, New Mexico
- Occupation: motivational speaker
- Years active: 1980s–present

Sonny Melendrez (born 1946) is an American radio and TV personality, motivational speaker and author.

== Early life ==
Melendrez was born in Silver City, New Mexico.

== Career ==
Twice named Billboard magazine's "Radio Personality of the Year", he is included in the Rock & Roll Hall of Fame as one of the Top 100 Radio Personalities of All Time. In 2004 he was inducted into the Texas Radio Hall of Fame and in 2017 he entered the San Antonio Radio Hall of Fame.

In the late 1960s, Melendrez was a DJ at KINT-AM in El Paso, Texas. This was before the advent of KINT-FM in the early 1970s.

In 1971, he was Program Director and on-air personality at KTSA radio in San Antonio.

In the 1970s, he guest hosted American Top 40 on several occasions and entertained on radio at KIIS, KMPC, KFI, KMGG and KRLA in Los Angeles.

He hosted the children's series You and Me Kid, on the Disney Channel from 1983 to 1990.

In 1985, he returned to San Antonio, hosting morning drive radio shows on KTFM (1985–1997), KSMG (1997–2001), KLUP (2001–2003), and KAHL-FM (2003–2005).

In 1997, the City of San Antonio named the Melendrez Community Center located on the city's West Side in his honor for his support of Parks and Recreation youth programs.

In 2005, he became a motivational keynote speaker, delivering presentations nationally and worldwide.

According to Melendrez' own on-line "mini biography", Melendrez is the voice of several characters in the cartoon show The Jetsons; he created many of the sounds heard in the Gremlins movie; was the bug who yelled "Oh, no! It's Raaaaaaid!" in the popular TV commercial; played opposite Walter Matthau as the voice of Bob Cratchet in the animated TV classic, The Stingiest Man in Town; and was even the voice of Fred the Cockatoo in the '70s ABC TV series, Baretta.
