= Videopolis (TV series) =

- Genre: Dance
- Developed by: The Walt Disney Company
- Presented by: Randy Hamilton
- Country of origin: United States
- Original language: English
- No. of seasons: 2
- No. of episodes: 80

Production
- Producer: Walt Disney Television

Original release
- Network: Disney Channel
- Release: 1987 – 1989

Related
- Videopolis: Startracks

Videopolis is an American dance show that aired on the Disney Channel from 1987 to 1989.

== Synopsis ==
Segments included the line dance, dance contests, and a segment where a pair of feet dancing are seen while the dancer's face appears on the screens. Among the acts that performed on Videopolis included Debbie Gibson, New Kids on the Block, Tiffany, New Edition, Menudo, Pebbles, Janet Jackson, The Jets, and many others. There was also a monthly show called Videopolis: Startracks that ran between 1987 and 1990.
