= The Secret of Lost Creek =

- Genre: Adventure; Family
- Created by: The Walt Disney Company
- Country of origin: United States
- Original language: English
- No. of seasons: 1
- No. of episodes: 5 (list of episodes)

Production
- Running time: 30 minutes
- Production company: Walt Disney Television

Original release
- Network: Disney Channel
- Release: February 1 – March 1, 1992

The Secret of Lost Creek is an American adventure television series that aired on the Disney Channel from February 1 to March 1, 1992.

== Premise ==
Two siblings spend the summer at their grandparents' house where Jeannie finds clues to a buried treasure and Robert tries to find Bigfoot.

== Cast ==
- Shannen Doherty as Jeannie Fogle
- Jody Montana as Travis Hathaway
- Scott Bremner as Robert Fogle
- Florence H. French as Adelaid Murchison
- Ruth Hale as Augusta Murchison
- Dabbs Greer as Henry Fogel
- Marjorie Hilton as Hettie Fogel
- Don Shanks as Charlie Little Elk
- Christa Denton as Camie
- Shawn Phelan as Russy
- Darrin Wheaton as Hardy
- Jesse Bennett as P.T. Butler

== Episodes ==
| No. | Title | Directed by | Written by | Original release date |
|---|---|---|---|---|
| 1 | "Pilot" | Mark Jean | Paul W. Cooper | February 1, 1992 |
Robert thinks he saw Bigfoot.
| 2 | "Gold Fever" | Mark Jean | Paul W. Cooper | February 8, 1992 |
Jeannie gets invited to a dance at the local town. The kids decide to investigate the local legend about a buried treasure at a mountain called Stone Face.
| 3 | "Stone Face" | Mark Jean | Paul W. Cooper | February 15, 1992 |
The kids research the newspaper archive to find out more about the buried treasure.
| 4 | "Return to Stone Face" | Mark Jean | Paul W. Cooper | February 22, 1992 |
The town prepares for a parade.
| 5 | "Dangerous Treasure" | Mark Jean | Paul W. Cooper | March 1, 1992 |
The kids' investigation leads back to the mountain.

== International ==
In Germany the episodes were recut into 15 short segments, each around 5 minutes only, and aired within the then popular "Disney Club". Disney Club was a weekly saturday afternoon show for children. The same was done with „Teen Angel“ (1989), which was aired after Lost Creek had ended.
