= List of Big Hero 6: The Series episodes =

Big Hero 6: The Series is an American animated television series developed by Mark McCorkle and Bob Schooley for Disney Television Animation, based on the film which in turn is based on the characters created by Steven T. Seagle and Duncan Rouleau (credited to Man of Action) and published by Marvel Comics. It premiered with a one hour pilot on November 20, 2017 on Disney XD and premiering again, on June 9, 2018 on Disney Channel. Starting on September 3, 2019, the series began to air on both networks, simultaneously. Taking place after the events of the film, the show follows the continuing adventures of Hiro Hamada and his robot companion Baymax who, together with their friends, fight crime in the city of San Fransokyo.

The series was renewed for a second season, months before the first season's premiere with a third season announced shortly before the second season premiere.

On January 28, 2021, members of the cast stated that the series would not return for a fourth season, with the final episode airing on February 15, 2021.

== Series overview ==
Season	Episodes		Originally released	
Season	Episodes		First released	Last released
1	22		November 20, 2017	October 13, 2018
2	24	13	May 6, 2019	September 5, 2019
2	24	11	September 6, 2019	February 8, 2020
3	10 (Note: 19 segments; every episode following the season premiere "The Hyper-Potamus Pizza-Party-Torium" contains two 11 minute segments)		September 21, 2020	February 15, 2021

== Episodes ==
=== Season 1 (2017–18) ===
No. overall	No. in season	Title	Directed by	Written by	Original release date	US viewers (millions)
1	1	"Baymax Returns" (Note: This episode is a one-hour special.)	Stephen Heneveld & Ben Juwono	Written by : Sharon Flynn & Paiman Kalayeh; Storyboarded by : Trey Buongiorno, Christopher Copeland, Monica Davila, Michael Fong, Stephanie Stine, David VanTuyle & Young Ki Yoon	November 20, 2017 (Note: This episode premiered on Disney XD and Disney Channel simultaneously.)	1.11
After the events of Big Hero 6, Hiro discovers Baymax's personality chip and proceeds to rebuild his skeleton. Meanwhile, Fred tries to convince the reluctant group to return to crime-fighting as the superhero team Big Hero 6. Elsewhere, Yama is hired by the mysterious Obake to steal an unusual paperweight from Professor Granville, the new dean at SFIT and Hiro's professor. Hiro rushes the rebuilding process and the skeleton malfunctions, escapes, and is captured by Yama and his crew. Yama pressures Hiro to retrieve the paperweight in exchange for the skeleton. With Fred's help, they get it, but Yama double-crosses them. Wasabi, Go-Go, and Honey Lemon arrive, save them, and retrieve the skeleton and paperweight, but Yama creates duplicates of the skeleton, sending them out to attack the city. Yama steals the paperweight which is revealed to have a powerful magnetic energy that affects electric appliances including a train that Aunt Cass is riding on. Big Hero 6 stops the train and Hiro tosses the paperweight into the sky where it safely explodes. The next day, Granville gives Hiro Tadashi's old lab, so he can have a familiar environment to work in, and he joins his friends in becoming the Big Hero 6 while Obake contemplates his next move.
2	2	"Issue 188"	Ben Juwono	Written by : Bill Motz & Bob Roth; Storyboarded by : Trey Buongiorno, Ben Juwono, Max Lawson & Stephanie Stine	June 9, 2018 (Note: Beginning with this episode, new episodes would premiere on Disney Channel instead of Disney XD. Additionally, this episode was first released on Disney Channel UK's YouTube account on February 16, 2018.)	0.65
Professor Granville sets Hiro up with Karmi, a student studying biology. Karmi despises Hiro for replacing her as the youngest student to join SFIT, yet ironically, she has a crush on Hiro's alter ego which she somehow cannot seem to recognize. Meanwhile, Big Hero 6 takes on Barb and Juniper, known collectively as the electricity and pop music powered mother-daughter duo High Voltage. To help, Fred has to visit his arch-nemesis, Richardson Mole who has in his possession issue 188 of Captain Fancy. In the end, Fred's mission turned out to be in regards to Hiro's identity not being noticed; Go-Go takes out High Voltage easily regardless. Hiro realizes that Granville set him up with Karmi to help her become more social. Karmi gains some respect for Hiro but now thinks that he "has it bad" for her.
3	3	"Big Roommates 2"	Kathleen Good	Written by : Jeff Poliquin; Storyboarded by : Aldina Dias, Kathleen Good, Jay Oliva, Kenji Ono & Alan Wan	June 9, 2018 (Note: This episode premiered in Australia on March 17, 2018.)	0.67
After accidentally freezing her apartment and roommate, Honey Lemon asks to stay at Go Go's place causing the latter to become annoyed at the former's positive personality. While moving in, a pathetic criminal named Dibs steals Honey's chem-purse. He soon discovers Alistair Krei's latest invention, a rip-off of Hiro's microbot neurotransmitter, and tries to steal it too. An accident with both devices transforms him into a glob monster, later dubbed Globby, and he begins to upset San Fransokyo. Honey refuses to believe that someone stole her purse, but upon meeting Globby becomes moody and downtrodden. When Big Hero 6 finally confronts Globby, who had kidnapped Krei, Go-Go convinces Honey to give positive advice to him and becomes happy again. However, Globby misinterprets Honey's advice and decides to become a villain instead.
4	4	"Fred's Bro-Tillion"	Stephen Heneveld	Written by : Sharon Flynn; Storyboarded by : Stephen Heneveld, David VanTuyle & Young Ki Yoon	June 10, 2018 (Note: This episode premiered in the United Kingdom on March 1, 2018.)	0.67
Fred is worried about his upcoming Bro-Tillion due to past mishaps involving his mother and billionaire rival Beverly Samantha "Binky" Mole whom Mrs. Frederickson keeps trying to impress. The gang helps Fred get prepared, and Hiro manages to get Aunt Cass to serve as a caterer after a sudden cancellation. During the celebration, however, Mr. Frederickson's rival Baron Von Steamer arrives attempting to kidnap Fred as revenge for Mr. Frederickson's days as Boss Awesome. He kidnaps Wasabi instead, mistaking him for Fred, and the rest of the team contacts Mr. Frederickson for advice. They find Steamer's hideout and Fred uses what he has learned to defeat Steamer, who escapes. Afterward, they hold Fred's Bro-Tillion at Aunt Cass' diner and Mrs. Frederickson overcomes her insecurity about Binky.
5	5	"Food Fight"	Kathleen Good	Written by : ND Stevenson; Storyboarded by : Aldina Dias, Teny Issakhanian, Max Lawson, James W. Suhr & David VanTuyle	June 10, 2018 (Note: This episode premiered in Australia on March 24, 2018.)	0.73
Ninja-chef Momakase steals a gravity controlling device from Krei. While Big Hero 6 investigate, Hiro accidentally indicates he is not studying to Cass, who goes to Good Luck Alley to look for him. She finds herself at an underground cooking competition against her mean idol- Bolton Gramercy and wins, taking his knives in the process, becoming addicted to the competition. Meanwhile, Momakase's employer Yama, reveals that she only stole half of the gravity device. She steals the other half but turns against Yama to sell the device on the Black Market. Hiro becomes concerned for Cass' late-night runs and discovers her secret. Cass goes up against Momakase who begins to fight Big Hero 6 as well. Cass and Big Hero 6 become victorious and Bolton apologizes with Cass returning his knives from her now large collection.
6	6	"Muirahara Woods"	Stephen Heneveld	Written by : Sharon Flynn; Storyboarded by : Monica Davila, David VanTuyle & Young Ki Yoon	June 16, 2018 (Note: This episode premiered in Australia on March 31, 2018.)	0.62
Go-Go heads off for some alone time which bothers Hiro, so he, Fred, and Baymax decide to follow her. They discover that she goes to the Muirahara Woods to go bird watching, but they end up getting lost when all their technology including Baymax begins to malfunction. Hiro and Fred encounter Ned Ludd, a real estate developer who went missing after a magnetic meteorite, which he named Bessie, crashed in front of him. Taking it as a sign to turn from technology, he has lived in the woods since. After seeing Baymax, Ludd kidnaps him to throw him off a cliff. Go-Go learns from Wasabi and Honey about Hiro and Fred's predicament and the three meet up with the two to help rescue Baymax. They manage to outsmart Ludd, who injures himself and have Baymax fix him, though he angrily tells them to leave immediately.
7	7	"Failure Mode"	Kathleen Good	Written by : Kenny Byerly; Storyboarded by : Travis Blaise, Max Lawson, Matthew O'Callaghan, Kenji Ono & James W. Suhr	June 23, 2018 (Note: This episode premiered in Australia on April 7, 2018.)	0.67
Hiro is assigned a project by Granville that involves creating a structure that could withstand an earthquake. Due to procrastinating, Hiro fails and is humiliated. He is given another chance by Granville, but he considers giving up. Meanwhile, Globby returns with the intent of stealing a painting called "City Rises". Big Hero 6 stops him at every turn until Globby accidentally discovers that he can transform himself into any matter (e.g. water, acid, metal, chocolate, etc.). Before fighting him again, Baymax shows Hiro a video of Tadashi almost giving up on creating him which surprises Hiro. The Big Hero 6 return to battle Globby, but this time, he actually makes off with the painting, though Hiro has learned to deal with failure and manages to improve his project. Globby delivers the painting to Obake who reveals a blueprint behind it.
8	8	"Aunt Cass Goes Out"	Stephen Heneveld	Story by : Joe Ansolabehere; Teleplay by : Jeff Poliquin; Storyboarded by : Trey Buongiorno, Monica Davila, David VanTuyle & Young Ki Yoon	June 30, 2018 (Note: This episode premiered in Germany on April 9, 2018.)	0.64
Hiro, concerned about Cass finding out about his place in Big Hero 6, decides to set her up on a date with no success. Meanwhile, Krei introduces his new defense drone, which Hiro points out could potentially be flawed due to some bugs. Dr. Mel Meyers, the creator of the drone, is upset over how Krei is using them and swears revenge. Krei and Cass end up meeting and decide to go out, much to Hiro's consternation. While Hiro spies on them, the rest of the team discovers that when the drones get wet, they attack everyone regardless. Mel uses drone technology to pose as Krei and get his plans back. Big Hero 6 stops him, but the drones once again malfunction and attack with Mel running and putting Cass in danger. Hiro and Baymax defeat the drones and Krei has Mel arrested. Cass breaks up with Krei after seeing him for who he is.
9	9	"The Impatient Patient"	Kathleen Good	Written by : Bob Schooley & Mark McCorkle; Storyboarded by : Monica Davila, Aldina Dias, Karen Guo, Teny Issakhanian & James W. Suhr	July 7, 2018	0.64
The high octane black ops group, the Mad Jacks, attempt to steal a chip recently bought by Krei. Hiro and Baymax arrive to rescue him, but Hiro suddenly becomes sick. At the advice of his friends, he is forced to stay in bed while the rest go out on night patrol. Hiro sets out on his own but is picked up by one of the Jacks and dropped into a dumpster, breaking his leg. The Mad Jacks manage to get the chip from Krei and deliver it to their employer, Obake. When Big Hero 6 sans Hiro arrives, Obake has the Jacks hang onto it. Hiro quickly creates a robotic replica for him to control and they defeat the Jacks and get the chip back to Krei. This turns out to be part of Obake's plan. Krei searches the chip to find nothing, but Obake gets information from Krei including the identity of Hiro Hamada.
10	10	"Mr. Sparkles Loses His Sparkle"	Kathleen Good	Written by : Paiman Kalayeh; Storyboarded by : Aldina Dias, Max Lawson, Naomi Hicks, Kenji Ono, Teny Issakhanian & James W. Suhr	July 14, 2018 (Note: This episode premiered in Germany on April 13, 2018.)	0.62
Cass teaches Mochi to slow clap which quickly goes viral upsetting game show host Mr. Sparkles who quickly begins losing his audience. Meanwhile, Hiro tries to invent a new system for Big Hero 6 that will deliver their suits by air, but his ideas seem to fail with Wasabi diagnosing that he has "inventor's block". Mr. Sparkles kidnaps Mochi and puts him in a new and deadly version of his game show stating that if anyone can beat it within the hour, Mochi will go free. Baymax protects Cass while Hiro tries to invent a new device and the rest of the team confronts Mr. Sparkles. Eventually, Go-Go overcomes the challenges, but Mr. Sparkles launches Mochi into space anyway. Hiro releases his new robot, Skymax, to rescue Mochi and use as the team's official suit delivery service. Mr. Sparkles celebrates his newfound infamy.
11	11	"Killer App"	Ben Juwono	Written by : Daniel Dominguez; Storyboarded by : Trey Buongiorno, Michael Fong & Maria Nguyen	July 21, 2018 (Note: This episode premiered in Australia on May 5, 2018.)	0.68
Noodle Burger Boy, the robotic mascot of Noodle Burger, is kidnapped by Obake so he can use his prediction algorithm on Big Hero 6. Granville assigns Hiro and Wasabi with creating a machine that can clean up space debris, but with Hiro's messiness and Wasabi's need for order, the two have trouble working together. Concerned for Noodle Burger Boy, Fred convinces Go-Go and Honey to help search for him and they end up fighting a reprogrammed version of him. They later learn from Krei that his designs were initially for military combat. While finishing up on their project, Baymax is kidnapped by Noodle Burger Boy. Overcoming their differences, Hiro and Wasabi trade suits and manage to defeat him, though he escapes. Noodle Burger Boy reveals his scans of Big Hero 6 to Obake so now he knows all of their identities.
12	12	"Small Hiro One"	Stephen Heneveld	Written by : Jenny Jaffe; Storyboarded by : David VanTuyle, Monica Davila & Young Ki Yoon	July 28, 2018 (Note: This episode premiered in Spain on June 22, 2018.)	0.56
Dr. Trevor Trengrove is giving a lecture at SFIT, but Hiro is not allowed in due to the age restrictions, forcing him as well as Fred and Baymax to listen to children's scientist Wendy Wower. Trengrove kicks out all of the students (Karmi included) except for Wasabi, Go-Go, and Honey and they begin creating defensive weaponry. Hiro ends up spotting Yama and rushes to tell his friends where it is revealed that Trengrove is a phony and Yama threatened him to upgrade his robot Mega Yama. The Big Hero 6 battle and defeat it and Yama escapes. Trengrove comes clean to Wendy, having stolen her thesis and based his career around it, and Wendy forgives him. Later while talking to Wendy, Hiro learns that Granville taught at SFIT years ago and finds a yearbook with her and a student presumed to be a young Obake.
13	13	"Kentucky Kaiju"	Ben Juwono	Written by : Sharon Flynn; Storyboarded by : Karen Guo, Michael Fong & Trey Buongiorno	August 4, 2018 (Note: This episode premiered in Latin America on July 15, 2018.)	0.62
Obake has Globby feed self-doubt into Hiro resulting in him creating Nano-Dex, a suit that gives him super strength. While useful at first, the suit causes problems for him at school and he cannot seem to remove it. Mr. Frederickson offers a heart-to-heart chat with Hiro, informing him that he needs to find another hidden strength. Meanwhile, Fred buys the original prop from the monster movie Kentucky Kaiju. Disappointed with its miniature size, he creates a giant "accurate" version which is quickly taken over by Noodle Burger Boy. Hiro, having overworked Nano-Dex and now can remove it, ends up having to defeat Kentucky Kaiju by himself and does so by tricking it into walking on a power line. He finds a data chip created by Obake and figures that someone is messing with him. Obake is pleased with Hiro's deductive capabilities.
14	14	"Rivalry Weak"	Stephen Heneveld	Written by : Han-Yee Ling; Storyboarded by : Monica Davila, David VanTuyle & Young Ki Yoon	August 11, 2018	0.62
Honey has been taking classes at San Fransokyo Art Institute and does not tell her friends. On Rivalry Week, both colleges attempt to prank one another frightening Honey. While Granville, Wasabi, and Fred guard the cafe, Hiro, Baymax, Honey and Go Go break into SFAI and encounter a secret lab owned by founder Lenore Shimamoto. Honey takes her journal and reads some of it (though some of the pages are blank), but Obake, posing as a curator, tricks her into giving it to him. The Big Hero 6 locate the journal and find Obake who traps them in recreated rooms with tests. The team beat them and Obake flees, leaving the journal behind. The group reveals to Honey that they knew all along that she took SFAI classes and that they do not care. Obake examines the scanned journal and finds hidden formulas on the blank pages.
15	15	"Fan Friction"	Ben Juwono	Written by : Jenny Jaffe; Storyboarded by : Trey Buongiorno, Michael Fong & Karen Guo	August 18, 2018	0.55
Karmi begins writing fan fiction about herself and the Big Hero 6 which everyone at SFIT, except Hiro, seems to enjoy. Meanwhile, Obake breaks Momakase out of prison. When Big Hero 6 takes on her, Go-Go tries out one of Karmi's suggested moves and finds out that it works. Soon, Wasabi, Honey, and Fred follow up as well while Hiro cannot seem to accept any of the ideas due to being embarrassed by Karmi's crush on his alter ego. Eventually, Momakase discovers the stories and kidnaps Karmi and has her held on Krei's old laboratory on Akuma Island. Big Hero 6 arrive but are all captured just as the island's structure is to be disintegrated. Hiro reveals that he followed up on Karmi's story and gives Baymax an overdrive mode and they all escape. Hiro thanks Karmi and allows her to continue writing her stories.
16	16	"Mini-Max"	Kathleen Good & Kenji Ono	Written by : Paiman Kalayeh; Storyboarded by : Teny Issakhanian, Ben Juwono, Max Lawson & James W. Suhr	August 25, 2018	0.59
Due to Fred's inability to fight crime by himself without causing damage, Hiro comes up with Mini-Max, a miniature "sidekick" to babysit Fred while the rest of the team are in class. Mini-Max ends up being successful, but Fred begins to over-rely on him. Meanwhile, Hiro begins following Granville when he becomes suspicious of her past. He visits a remorseful Callaghan in prison who reveals that Granville was involved in an accident at SFIT many years ago. Hiro runs into Granville at night and she shows him her new security system which is taken over by Obake. Granville explains that she had a student whom she trusted too much and he ended up in an accident that she took the blame for. Fred and Mini-Max come and rescue the two with Fred tricking the system into destroying itself. Afterward, Hiro and Granville begin trusting each other more.
17	17	"Big Hero 7"	Kenji Ono	Written by : Sharon Flynn; Storyboarded by : Ben Juwono, Sung Shing, Zane Yarbrough, Vince Aparo, Trey Buongiorno, Karen Guo & Miyuki Hoshikawa	September 8, 2018	0.51
Barb and Juniper, who are upset with each other, each steal a Krei battery so that they can each look for the orb that powers them. Meanwhile, Mole gets on Fred's nerves when he steals his idea for a superhero museum and carries a fake signed photo from "Lizard Guy", resulting in Fred revealing that he is Fredzilla and part of Big Hero 6. Having no concern for their safety, Mole blackmails them with personal favors until he decides to become a member as well with a small red variant of Fred's suit. Barb and Juniper discover that the orb was taken out of the police archive and is in Mole's possession and head to his comic book store where they make up. Go Go and Fred defeat them with the latter rescuing a semi-grateful Mole. When he tries taking the orb for himself, he is electrocuted and forgets their identities.
18	18	"Big Problem"	Stephen Heneveld	Written by : Jenny Jaffe; Storyboarded by : Trey Buongiorno, Johnny Castuciano, David VanTuyle & Young Ki Yoon	September 15, 2018	0.45
Fred is attacked by a creature that quotes Shakespeare's The Tempest. Meanwhile, billionaire Liv Amara arrives at SFIT to see Baymax, but upon learning that Hiro did not build him, she instead takes an interest in Karmi's extra-dermal nano-receptors making Hiro jealous. The creature then attacks Krei industries as he gives a similar account and connects it to Orso Knox, another scientist who was supposed to visit Fred and Krei. They soon realize that they are both the same and that he plans to attack Amara; the team creates extra titanium variants of their suits and attends Amara's gala where they battle Knox. Just as Knox is about to attack Amara, Karmi uses her invention to defeat him. Amara plans to fund Karmi's project, but compliments the Big Hero 6's uniforms for being unique and Hiro learns to deal with Karmi's success.
19	19	"Steamer's Revenge"	Ben Juwono	Written by : Paiman Kalayeh; Storyboarded by : Trey Buongiorno, Karen Guo, Annie Jingyi Li & Stephanie Stine	September 22, 2018	0.56
As the gang gets ready for Wasabi's birthday, Hiro gets the idea to finally fish Wasabi's car out of the lake, all the while Obake watches from the shadows. Meanwhile, Fred feels down about not living up to his father's expectations after a statue of Boss Awesome is erected. Go-Go and Honey Lemon update and fix Wasabi's car, but suddenly get a message from Baron Von Steamer who plans another attack unless Boss Awesome comes. With Mr. Frederickson's help, Fred poses as Boss Awesome in an attempt to get at Steamer. Obake uses his radiofrequency device to help the Big Hero 6 realize that the Boss Awesome statue is really Steamer's new machine and the Big Hero 6, along with Wasabi's new car, successfully destroy it and arrest Steamer. Big Hero 6 realizes that Obake wanted something in the water as he turns the H_{2}O into D_{2}O.
20	20	"The Bot Fighter"	Kenji Ono	Written by : Han-Yee Ling; Storyboarded by : Drew Applegate, Sung Shing & Zane Yarbrough	September 29, 2018	0.52
Various battle robots have started robbing banks throughout San Fransokyo. With many innocents getting arrested, Big Hero 6 immediately deduces that Yama is behind it. Hiro decides to return to the bot fighting ring to find evidence only to run into Trina, a young bot fighter who Hiro helps and gets a crush on. The rest of the team grows concerned for Hiro's safety and the mission is jeopardized when Hiro gets arrested again and grounded by Cass. He manages to sneak back out and this time makes it to the finals, beating Yama. However, the team learns that Yama has an alibi and Hiro realizes that Trina is behind the thefts. They defeat her robot while she runs away and Hiro thanks his friends for sticking with him. Trina returns to her "father" Obake and it is revealed that Trina is in fact a robot trying to get info on Hiro.
21	21	"Obake Yashiki"	Stephen Heneveld	Written by : Sharon Flynn; Storyboarded by : Trey Buongiorno, Monica Davila, David VanTuyle & Young Ki Yoon	October 6, 2018	0.46
On Halloween Night, the gang goes to a haunted house, where they are sprayed with a gas that unknowingly places digital imaging lenses onto their eyes. Later the Big Hero 6 set out to stop Noodle Burger Boy's latest crime, but Hiro gets distracted after seeing Tadashi alive and roaming the city at night. He eventually meets his "brother" in the haunted house where he is overjoyed to see him again at first but soon realizes that this was just an illusion created by Obake, caused by the lenses which turn their fears into reality. As the rest of the team faces their worst fears, Noodle Burger Boy steals a high-powered magnet from SFIT. After the events, Hiro and his friends regroup and wonder how Obake knows them so well, while Noodle Burger Boy delivers the magnet to Obake, so he can use it for the machine he is building.
22	22	"Countdown to Catastrophe" (Note: This episode is an hour and a half special.)	Stephen Heneveld, Ben Juwono & Kenji Ono	Written by : Sharon Flynn, Paiman Kalayeh, Han-Yee Ling & Jeff Poliquin; Storyboarded by : Trey Buongiorno, Johnny Castuciano, Karen Guo, Chris Jimenez, Diana Kidlaied, Larry Leker, Mike Tisserand, David VanTuyle, Zane Yarbrough & Young Ki Yoon	October 13, 2018	0.51
After stopping Globby from stealing a piece of Krei Tech, Hiro learns from Krei that it was a broken piece from a failed energy amplifier. Inspired, Hiro decides to focus on recreating it for open house finals, only to be turned down by a visibly distraught Granville. He nevertheless continues with it, causing him to ignore his friends. Honey tries to do a project on Shimamoto, so she and Wasabi break into her lab and find an old wax filter. Fred concocts a plan to capture Globby by presenting a fake amplifier, but he arrives with Noodle Burger Boy, who unknowingly tampers with Baymax due to Hiro's late arrival. At the open house, Honey plays Shimamoto's message and she reveals herself to be the cause of the "great disaster" in the past. Obake (whose real name is Bob Aken) reveals himself to Granville and has Noodle Burger Boy, Globby, and Momakase attack the open house so he can steal Hiro's amplifier. Afterward, Granville (who is aware of Big Hero 6's identities) explains how she knows Obake. The tampered Baymax kidnaps Hiro and takes him to Obake who reveals his plan to create a star to destroy San Fransokyo so that he can rebuild it with Hiro as his student. Globby has a change of heart and frees Hiro and they unite with the rest to stop the impending destruction. Honey and Globby brace the flood while Go-Go and Wasabi protect the civilians and fight Momakase. Hiro, Fred, and Mini-Max then use Kentucky Kaiju to create a powerful wave that disrupts the star and causes Obake's lair to crumble. Obake frees Baymax and sends him to rescue Hiro while he resigns himself to his fate. Granville decides to pass Hiro for his heroic deeds and he admits that he is unsure if Obake survived.

=== Season 2 (2019–20) ===
Bob Schooley announced that unlike season one, season two would be split into two story arcs with the first one titled City of Monsters and the second one titled Fugitives.

No. overall	No. in season	Title	Directed by	Written by	Original release date	US viewers (millions)
City of Monsters
23	1	"Internabout"	Stephen Heneveld	Written by : Jenny Jaffe; Storyboarded by : Trey Buongiorno, Johnny Castuciano, David VanTuyle, Adam Van Wyk & Ae Ri Yoon	May 6, 2019	0.21
Noodle Burger Boy and Trina return with the former malfunctioning and looking for "home" while the latter proceeds to give herself an upgraded robot body. Meanwhile, Hiro is jealous of Karmi's internship at Sycorax, where she has her own lab. To compete with her, he interns at Krei Tech, but Krei has him do demeaning jobs such as getting him coffee and his dry cleaning. The team goes looking for Noodle Burger Boy and fights him where they discover that "home" is in fact Krei Tech, the place where he was built. Noodle Burger Boy kidnaps Krei, Baymax, and Hiro and forces the latter to fix him. Trina arrives to prevent Hiro from saving Baymax and Krei, but Hiro uses a new magnet disk to defeat the villains who escape. Afterward, Krei offers an actual internship to Hiro complete with his own lab which he has to take because he signed a contract.
24	2	"Seventh Wheel"	Kenji Ono	Written by : Paiman Kalayeh; Storyboarded by : Steve Hirt, Kenji Ono & Mike Tisserand	May 7, 2019	0.28
Momakase makes a secret deal with Amara that involves getting some kind of implant. Later, Momakase robs Fred's house of expensive cheese. Granville begins offering advice to the team that proves to be somewhat helpful, but over time begins to annoy them when she starts to intrude on their hero work. The group suggests Hiro confront her about it, but he refuses to be rebellious this semester. While trying to catch Momakase, she damages Baymax and the group must go without him to capture Momakase at an exclusive dinner being attended by Amara, Krei, and numerous others. The team is locked in a pantry causing Granville to realize her mistakes. She fixes Baymax and they rescue the team from an upgraded and beast-like Momakase. Granville apologizes for her intrusions to Hiro while Momakase escapes in her new animalistic appearance.
25	3	"Prey Date"	Ben Juwono	Written by : Han-Yee Ling; Storyboarded by : Trey Buongiorno, Karen Guo & Paulene Phouybanhdyt	May 8, 2019	0.24
Amara visits the Frederickson residence where Hiro asks her how Knox is doing. After giving a vague answer, Hiro begins to suspect that something is wrong. He, Fred, and Baymax visit Sycorax and convince Karmi to check on Knox's condition. When Amara diverts her, she becomes suspicious and the four break into the lower level lab where Karmi realizes that she can cure Knox. Amara arrives and takes Fred away, but Knox is set loose, locking down the whole building. Fred calls the rest of the team just when Knox kidnaps Hiro. Later, Hiro realizes that Knox is still docile and chases him into the sewers, just as the rest of Big Hero 6 does as well. They rescue Knox and return him with Karmi hinting that she does have some concern for Hiro. A newly cured Knox is revealed to be threatened by Amara who can change him back whenever she wants.
26	4	"Something's Fishy"	Stephen Heneveld	Written by : Sharon Flynn; Storyboarded by : Johnny Castuciano, David VanTuyle & Ae Ri Yoon	May 9, 2019	0.33
While testing out Fred's new chameleon suit, Hiro is informed by Cass that she has set up a date with a girl named Megan Cruz. Megan and Hiro hit it off, especially due to her being "normal", something Hiro actually envies. She sympathetically invites him to her dance which he happily accepts. Meanwhile, Amara breaks High Voltage out of prison. The two want to go straight, but she threatens them and gives them electric eel implants allowing them to use electricity powers without their orb and begin developing voracious appetites. They crash the dance that Hiro and Megan are attending. When Big Hero 6 arrive, they once again plan to go straight, but mutate further and reaffirm their villainy. They fight, but High Voltage flees back to Amara, now fully mutated as eels. Megan's father turns out to be the chief of police and dislikes superheroes.
27	5	"Nega-Globby"	Ben Juwono	Written by : Sharon Flynn; Storyboarded by : Trey Buongiorno, Karen Guo & Paulene Phouybanhdyt	May 10, 2019	0.28
Globby wants to go back to being Dibs when he realizes that it is difficult to get a job. Honey Lemon gleefully asks Granville to use one of the labs which are overheard by Amara. Honey Lemon has Karmi help her develop a serum, but in the middle of the night, Chris, Amara's assistant steals a sample of Globby. The gang runs the serum on Globby and he successfully turns back into Dibs. While happy at first, he reveals to Felony Carl that he misses having powers. Amara begins doing tests on the sample and creates an angry evil being, later dubbed Nega-Globby by Fred. Amara allows it to escape, where it comes in contact with Big Hero 6. Dibs, realizing they need help, recreates his accident and becomes Globby again, devouring Nega-Globby. Globby finally gets love and attention from citizens, but Nega-Globby is still alive inside of him.
28	6	"The Fate of the Roommates"	Kenji Ono	Story by : Jeff Poliquin; Teleplay by : Paiman Kalayeh; Storyboarded by : Steve Hirt, Wynton Redmond & Sam Szymanski	May 13, 2019	0.39
A trio of futuristic street racers appear in San Fransokyo. Meanwhile, Go Go is getting tired of Honey's intrusions in their apartment. Honey later tells her that she can finally move back into her dorm which surprisingly affects Go-Go. Baymax tries to get her to open up to Honey, but she has trouble being honest about her emotions. The gang learns that the streetcars are all remote-controlled by rich racers in a challenge set up by Mr. Sparkles, who has teamed up with Yama. Felony Carl gives up the information and Fred's butler, Heathcliff, poses as a wealthy socialite so that he can join the racing challenge. The Big Hero 6 discovers that Mr. Sparkles has tricked Yama and despite Heathcliff and Go Go's efforts, Mr. Sparkles escapes. Go-Go finally tells Honey she does not want her to leave and she stays. Mr. Sparkles meets with Amara about upgrades.
29	7	"Muira-Horror!"	Stephen Heneveld	Written by : Jenny Jaffe; Storyboarded by : Johnny Castuciano, David VanTuyle & Ae Ri Yoon	May 14, 2019	0.38
Krei successfully purchases the Muirahara woods from under Amara. Hiro mentions that technology does not work due to Bessie, the meteor and that it is owned by Ludd, an old friend of Krei's. Amara and her assistant Chris, steal Bessie and give Ludd a patch that slowly transforms him into the Hibagon. Hiro, Krei, and Go Go return to talk to Ludd but end up getting chased by his monstrous form. Meanwhile, the rest of the gang watch over the café until Mochi sneaks out forcing Fred, Baymax, and Mini-Max to go get him. Krei demonstrates his wilderness skills and gets Hiro, Go-Go, and himself out, but Ludd follows them. They fight on the bridge until Mochi attacks Ludd and removes the patch which Hiro finds. Krei decides to keep the Muirahara woods exactly as it is and Hiro and Go Go return Ludd while Amara and Chris work on Bessie.
30	8	"Something Fluffy"	Kenji Ono	Written by : Han-Yee Ling; Storyboarded by : Steve Hirt, Ben Juwono, Wynton Redmond & Mike Tisserand	May 15, 2019	0.27
Hiro confronts Amara at a Q&A about the recent rise in monsters. Later, Amara creates numerous small creatures called Mayoi and anonymously releases them all over San Fransokyo. The creatures become a hit with everyone, minus Hiro, who deduces that they are a plot by Amara. The Mayoi begin growing bigger and the gang takes theirs to Karmi who reveals that they are plant-based and growing naturally. Soon, the Mayoi become large monsters and Big Hero 6 try to corral them. Mr. Sparkles appears and claims that he was the one behind the recent monsters and takes control of the giant Mayoi. Amara arrives with Karmi and Chris and "aid" Big Hero 6 in defeating the Mayoi while Mr. Sparkles escapes. Amara is hailed a hero, causing suspicion from Big Hero 6. Amara goes into her lab where she has an individual kept in some kind of stasis.
31	9	"Supersonic Sue"	Ben Juwono	Written by : Paiman Kalayeh; Storyboarded by : Karen Guo, Paulene Phouybanhdyt & Trey Buongiorno	May 16, 2019	0.31
Big Hero 6 encounters Supersonic Sue, a roller-skating speedster villain. They contact Mr. Frederickson who reveals that she was in fact one of the many villains he faced. Meanwhile, Fred attends a Noodle Burger taste testing and runs into Mole and they discover that they have a lot more in common than they realize. The gang visit Steamer in prison, but he is broken out and kidnapped by Sue who convinces him to team up with her despite their rivalry. Mole's friendship with Fred turns out to be a ruse as he steals his Captain Fancy underpants for his own collection. Nevertheless, Fred aids the rest of the team into fighting an overpowered Steamer and Sue but gets unexpected help from Mr. Frederickson as Boss Awesome. He does away with the villains and Fred lets Mole keep the underpants after realizing that he does not have any friends. Note: This episode was dedicated "in memory" of Stan Lee (the voice of Fred's dad), who died 6 months before the season premiere.
32	10	"Lie Detector"	Stephen Heneveld	Written by : Sharon Flynn; Storyboarded by : Trey Buongiorno, Johnny Castuciano, Ben Juwono, David VanTuyle & Ae Ri Yoon	May 17, 2019	0.25
The gang learns that Baymax has a built-in lie detector. Hiro amplifies this ability so that he can see if Amara is lying, but it creates an annoying beep sound for lying that begins irritating everyone. Hiro learns that Amara needs gold, which Mr. Sparkles and High Voltage are stealing at the moment. While Hiro, Baymax, and Go Go prevent the theft, the villains manage to escape. Hiro directly asks Amara if "Liv Amara is creating the monsters". She answers "Liv Amara is NOT creating the monsters" which turns out to be true. Amara gets annoyed at Big Hero 6 and she creates a Bessie/Bear hybrid creature to rob the bank of its gold. Big Hero 6 arrive and fights the creature, but they are unable to beat it and it flees with the gold. Amara returns to the Sycorax lab where the person in cryo-stasis is another Amara showing vitals.
33	11	"Write Turn Here"	Ben Juwono	Written by : Han-Yee Ling; Storyboarded by : Trey Buongiorno, Karen Guo & Paulene Phouybanhdyt	September 3, 2019	0.28
Granville forces Hiro to finish his original story assignment for class. He thinks the idea is stupid, especially when Karmi comes in with her Big Hero 6 fanfic, so he decides to write a Big Hero 6 story of his own. Throughout the day, Hiro's friends all contribute to his increasingly jarring and bizarre tale. Meanwhile, Trina, fed up with Noodle Burger Boy, tells him to make himself useful. Taking her words seriously, he creates duplicates of himself that all exhibit different personalities: Emo, Snooty, and Pirate. The Big Hero 6 defeat all of them, but the real Noodle Burger Boy takes control of the rebuilt Kentucky Kaiju to defeat them. They distract him by having him give input on the story and take him out. He returns to Trina who is apparently reviving Obake and Hiro ultimately decides to write a personal story about himself, Tadashi, and Baymax.
34	12	"City of Monsters"	Kenji Ono	Written by : Jenny Jaffe; Storyboarded by : Steve Hurt, Ben Juwono, Wynton Redmond & Mike Tisserand	September 4, 2019	0.22
35	13	"City of Monsters"	Stephen Heneveld	Written by : Jeff Poliquin; Storyboarded by : Johnny Castuciano, David VanTuyle & Ae Ri Yoon	September 5, 2019	0.18
Part 1: Karmi is tasked with developing a vaccine for a virus that, unknown to her, is for the real Liv Amara. She resolves to use robotics but does not know much about it. Hiro, after trying to get away from his friends who are trying to protect him, discovers Karmi's plan and confronts her. When Hiro learns that Tadashi needed help when building Baymax, he sympathetically decides to help her, and the two end up bonding and succeeding. Meanwhile, Amara gets Mr. Sparkles, Momakase, and Knox to kidnap Wendy Wower for her help and the Big Hero 6 arrive, with newly upgraded armor, to defeat the three and rescue her. Momakase tells Amara Hiro's identity and she goes after Karmi. She calls Hiro for help and he arrives with Baymax where he fights Bessie. When Hiro reaches Karmi, she has been given a mutating device, transforms, and kidnaps Hiro. Part 2: Hiro and Baymax are taken to Sycorax and forced to cure the real Liv Amara while the current Amara is actually her clone Diane "Di" Amara; made to search endlessly for a cure for her condition. The rest of the team faces Mr. Sparkles, High Voltage, Momakase, Knox, and Bessie. After gathering them all together, Mini-Max calls upon Ludd to come and coerce Bessie who turns around and depowers the villains back to normal, causing all the villains to be arrested. Hiro and Baymax destroy the virus inside of Liv, but Di wants to transform Hiro into a monster. After a stressful fight, Hiro manages to get through to the mutated Karmi and she fights back. Liv awakens from her coma and sets everything back to normal while Di and Chris are arrested. Hiro discovers that Karmi was taken home by her parents as told by Granville, but is happy to see she is still writing fanfics.
Fugitives
36	14	"Mini-Maximum Trouble"	Kenji Ono	Written by : Sharon Flynn; Storyboarded by : Karen Guo, Steve Hirt, Wynton Redmond & Mike Tisserand	September 6, 2019	0.23
Fred discovers Wasabi's phobia of bad luck and challenges it by performing a variety of bad luck rituals. While doing so, however, Mini-Max gets severely soaked with water and short circuits. Afterward, Fred begins to experience increasingly harsh cases of bad luck throughout his day and while crime-fighting. Meanwhile, Hiro learns that Megan is trying to uncover the secret identities of Big Hero 6 for a journalism class, which her father, Chief Cruz, fully endorses. Despite several close calls, Hiro manages to divert Megan's attempts. He discovers that Mini-Max has been sabotaging Fred's day. After short-circuiting, he suddenly has evil intentions and kidnaps Fred. The team comes to his rescue with Fred ultimately defeating him. Hiro waterproofs Mini-Max afterward but learns that Megan has zeroed in on recurring locations of Big Hero 6.
37	15	"El Fuego"	Stephen Heneveld	Written by : Paiman Kalayeh; Storyboarded by : Johnny Castuciano, David VanTuyle & Ae Ri Yoon	September 9, 2019	0.21
The gang checks out Mech-Wrestling where they meet El Fuego the "bad guy" of the league. The league's owner, the Mole, wants him to lose constantly due to his status, but he refuses and quits. El Fuego decides to face off against Baymax and constantly taunts him and his programming. Hiro becomes upset as he feels that he is mocking Tadashi's work. Meanwhile, Fred is mad that Mole has ownership of the league, as he does not even like wrestling, and wants to buy it from him. Cass suggests that he simply ignore him as it is the mature thing to do. Hiro creates a duplicate Baymax suit to fight El Fuego, but it is not enough to defeat him. The real Baymax arrives and manages to tire out El Fuego long enough for Fred to subdue him with the Hiro robot double. El Fuego is arrested and Hiro learns that he does not need to defend Tadashi's brilliant work.
38	16	"The Globby Within"	Trey Buongiorno & Ben Juwono	Written by : Jenny Jaffe; Storyboarded by : Trey Buongiorno, Karen Guo & Paulene Phouybanhdyt	September 10, 2019	0.19
Globby has become a beloved figure in San Fransokyo until his appendages start acting up on their own and getting him in trouble with the law. He heads straight to Big Hero 6 for help in clearing his name and they learn that Nega-Globby has begun manifesting itself inside of him and that it will eventually try to assume control. The team must help him in secret as Cruz has put a warrant out for anyone who tries to aid him. They eventually realize that if they make Nega-Globby stronger, he can escape Globby and they do so with Honey Lemon's new formula. After a lengthy battle, they suck up Nega-Globby, but Cruz spots them and puts an arrest warrant out for the team. Globby learns that he can mimic the appearance of anyone and Big Hero 6 decide to use the abandoned Frederickson chocolate factory as their new headquarters.
39	17	"Hardlight"	Kenji Ono	Written by : Han-Yee Ling; Storyboarded by : Trey Buongiorno, Steve Hirt, Wynton Redmond & Mike Tisserand	September 11, 2019	0.20
Cruz hires Krei Tech to create advanced anti-vigilante weaponry for them. At the same time, Hardlight, a video game-themed villain, arrives demanding that Big Hero 6 challenge him. Meanwhile, Fred hires Roderick "Roddy" Blair, a friend of his dad's, to help redesign a new lair for them, but is disappointed with his stoic work ethic. The Big Hero 6 tries to stop Hardlight when he robs the local museum, but he kidnaps Cruz. At Roddy's suggestion, the team decides to beat Hardlight with what they know as opposed to getting on his level. The Big Hero 6 fight Hardlight and defeat him with Cruz's help. He escapes, as does the Big Hero 6, with Cruz refusing to change his mind about them. Roddy completes the conference room for the lair, named Basemax, while Hardlight is revealed to be Ian, an employee at Krei Tech.
40	18	"The Present"	Stephen Heneveld	Written by : Sharon Flynn; Storyboarded by : Johnny Castuciano, Steve Hirt, David Vantuvle & Ae Ri Yoon	December 7, 2019	0.07
On Christmas Eve, Hiro discovers a present that he believes is from Cass. While at school, he mixes his backpack with Fred's by accident and calls him later to check. Fred does not find the present so he, Hiro, and Baymax begin searching. The present finds its way through Mole, Globby, Krei's assistant Judy and Krei himself who threw it out. At the junkyard, Noodle Burger Boy finds it and takes it away. It is at this point that Baymax reveals that the present is from Tadashi. The team gets together and discovers that Noodle Burger Boy, El Fuego, Mr. Sparkles, Supersonic Sue, and Steamer are having a gift exchange. A fight breaks out over the present with Big Hero 6 winning. Hiro finally opens the present: a miniature snow machine that Tadashi had built with Hiro in the past. The gang uses it to make it snow outside for Christmas.
41	19	"Hiro the Villain"	Trey Buongiorno	Written by : Jeff Poliquin; Storyboarded by : Trey Buongiorno, Karen Guo & Paulene Phouybanhdyt	January 4, 2020 (Disney XD); January 12, 2020 (Disney Channel)	0.15
Momakase escapes from prison, but Baymax is unable to scan for her. Hiro finds her at his house and she threatens him with revealing his and his friends' identities if he does not help her steal something from Yama. They retrieve a pair of swords that belonged to Momakase's family and soon make their escape once Yama returns, but encounter the rest of Hiro's team. After catching them up on what is going on, Momakase leads the police away so that Hiro and his friends can escape. Meanwhile, Megan continues to search Big Hero 6's identities and interviews Krei and Granville when she notices their many encounters with them. Cruz interviews a remorseful Callaghan who claims no knowledge of them, but Megan becomes intrigued by the fire that killed Tadashi. Upon reviewing the data she attained she surmises that Hiro is at the center of it all.
42	20	"Portal Enemy"	Stephen Heneveld	Written by : Sharon Flynn; Storyboarded by : Johnny Castuciano, Steve Hirt, David Vantuyle & Ae Ri Yoon	January 11, 2020 (Disney XD); January 19, 2020 (Disney Channel)	0.08
An acrobatic scientist named Celine "Sirque" Simard steals information on Silent Sparrow from Krei. Megan reveals to Hiro that she knows that he and his friends are Big Hero 6 and threatens to tell her father. Hiro invites her to their base to prove that they are necessary to stopping crime, much to the chagrin of his teammates. They have Megan shadow them and learn that Sirque has made a miniaturized teleporter, but it is becoming unstable and sucking things in. Hiro chases Cirque throughout the city until the portal begins getting violent. Together, they manage to stabilize it before it destroys the city and Cirque escapes. Megan decides not to tell her father about Big Hero 6 and writes an article about their importance. Hiro looks at his bodycam footage from the portals and discovers that the original Baymax is still there.
43	21	"Fred the Fugitive"	Kenji Ono	Written by : Paiman Kalayeh; Storyboarded by : Steve Hirt, Rie Koga & Mike Tisserand	January 18, 2020 (Disney XD); January 26, 2020 (Disney Channel)	0.12
Tired of not doing anything, Fred goes out in his Fredmeleon suit for night patrol with Mini-Max. However, in his incompetence, the suit gets damaged, and the cops arrest him. The rest of the team goes to rescue him and Hiro and Baymax end up leading Cruz away while Go Go, Wasabi, and Honey rescue Fred from the police truck. They hide out at a warehouse where Fred decides to own up to his mistake, but Mini-Max fixes his suit and they escape. Hiro, Baymax, and Cruz end up in Muirahara Woods where they are shot down by Bessie who is violent. Hiro sheds his armor and meets with Cruz who reveals that his hatred for superheroes stems from his father getting killed by a supervillain and Boss Awesome showed up too late. They learn that Bessie had cubs and find them and bring them back to her. Afterward, the team forgives Fred.
44	22	"Major Blast"	Trey Buongiorno	Written by : Jenny Jaffe; Storyboarded by : Abby Davies, Karen Guo & Paulene Phouybanhdyt	January 25, 2020 (Disney XD); February 2, 2020 (Disney Channel)	0.17
A villain named Major Blast appears with the intent to face Fred alone. Fred is scared as he admits that he is incapable of taking on such a serious threat by himself, so Go Go trains him in the new Simmax room. Hiro discovers that Major Blast once fought Boss Awesome back in the past, but that any information regarding the villain is almost nonexistent. Despite the training, Fred cannot stop getting distracted in his usual manner. Fred finally faces Major Blast on his own and, taking Roddy and Go Go's advice, defeats him with his ability to distract people. It is revealed that Major Blast is actually Fred's mom who had used the Major Blast alias to test if Boss Awesome was capable of defending himself and took up the mantle again to test if Fred was ready. Knowing that Fred is a true hero, Fred thanks her for concern.
45	23	"Fear Not"	Trey Buongiorno	Written by : Paiman Kalayeh; Storyboarded by : Karen Guo, Steve Hirt & Paulene Phouybanhdyt	February 1, 2020 (Disney XD); February 9, 2020 (Disney Channel)	0.07
While Supersonic Stu busts his grandmother Supersonic Sue out of prison, Granville asks Wasabi to substitute for an absent teacher. Wasabi has a fear of public speaking and cannot teach the class without tensing up for six hours. The team tries to train him to overcome his fear but to no avail. They soon battle the Supersonics for the first time, but upon hearing Fred mention Roddy, the Supersonics decide to kidnap him and force him to build a new lair for them. While the rest of the team tries to rescue Roddy, Wasabi finally teaches his class by using Mini-Max as a distraction. They eventually return to help the team in time by tricking them into getting caught by the police. As the team congratulates Wasabi on facing his fears, Krei talks with Cruz to reveal his new line of police protection robots to capture Big Hero 6.
46	24	"Legacies"	Stephen Heneveld & Kenji Ono	Written by : Han-Yee Ling, Jenny Jaffe & Jeff Poliquin; Storyboarded by : Johnny Castuciano, Karen Guo, Steve Hirt, Rie Koga, David Vantuyle & Ae Ri Yoon	February 8, 2020 (Disney XD); February 16, 2020 (Disney Channel)	N/A
While fighting El Fuego, the Big Hero 6 are confronted by Buddy Guardians, giant robots created by Krei for Cruz. Hiro and Megan sneak into the SFPD station and steal a programming chip from one of the Guardians. Upon examining the data, Hiro learns that the chip has Obake's programming on it. Believing that Obake is back, Hiro tries to warn Cruz, but to no avail. Hiro and Baymax sneak into Krei's office and manage to learn where the Guardians are being made, but the rest of the team fall into a trap set up by Cruz and are caught. Hiro and Baymax find the warehouse and learn that Trina has created the Guardians to obliterate San Fransokyo and make it a haven for robots. She launches her attack and proceeds to kidnap Megan. With Globby's help, the Big Hero 6 rescue her, and Cruz finally accepts them as heroes and learns their identities. Roddy builds a giant robot named Mega-Max, which he and Mini-Max pilot, to defeat the Guardians, while Hiro has several Megabots change the Guardians' AI chips to healthcare. The team successfully defeats Trina and her robot uprising. Later, Honey Lemon, Go-Go, and Wasabi graduate SFIT with Hiro accepting Tadashi's diploma on his behalf. He gives a speech about him to the applause of many.

=== Season 3 (2020–21) ===
Beginning with "Mayor for a Day", episodes now have a running time of 11 minutes instead of 22. However, to fit the half-hour timeslot, episodes are stitched together as segments of longer 22-minute episodes. It's also the only season in which not all members of Big Hero 6 are present in every episode (Fred was absent for 3, Go Go and Wasabi were absent for 4, while Honey Lemon was absent for 5).

No. overall	No. in season	Title	Directed by	Written by	Original release date	US viewers (millions)
47	1	"The Hyper-Potamus Pizza-Party-Torium"	Trey Buongiorno & Stephen Heneveld	Written by : Jeff Poliquin, Mark McCorkle & Bob Schooley; Storyboarded by : Johnny Castuciano, Karen Guo, Lior Lev, Sean Petrilak & Paulene Phouybanhdyt	September 21, 2020	0.12
Fred excitedly wants the team to devote their time to fighting crime, but Wasabi, Honey Lemon and Go Go reveal their plans to search for new jobs since their graduation. They fail to show up to aid the team when battling Noodle Burger Boy who is on a mission to create a new family using other mini A.I. mascots, the Hangry Panda and Crushroom. Hiro succumbs to the same kind of sadness that Fred is experiencing as he worries that their new job to Bragtech will mean them moving to a new city, but Cass comforts him with the knowledge that they will always be friends. Eventually, the team come together to prevent Hyper-Potamus from being taken by Noodle Burger Boy, but end up having to rescue employee Sara. While they fail to stop Noodle Burger Boy, the team promise each other to always be there for one another.
48	2	"Mayor for a Day"	Kenji Ono	Written by : Paiman Kalayeh; Storyboarded by : Johnny Castuciano & Paulene Phouybanhdyt	September 28, 2020	0.10
48	2	"The Dog Craze of Summer"	Trey Buongiorno	Written by : Han-Yee Ling; Storyboarded by : Jenessa Warren & Steve Hirt	September 28, 2020	0.10
"Mayor for a Day": Richardson Mole outbids Fred to be Mayor for a Day, much to his horror. With his new power, Mole begins to abuse Big Hero 6 by having them over at his office for insignificant issues. The team decide to ignore him, ironically when the Supersonics kidnap him in an effort to draw out Boss Awesome. They decide to team up with him to thwart Big Hero 6 instead and a fight in the streets ensues. Ultimately, the Supersonics flee while Mole is outed for his villainy. He pardons himself and flees, allowing Fred to take over as mayor for the day and getting his portrait put up and having kaijus become a transit service. "The Dog Craze of Summer": Granville approaches Hiro with dog-sitting for her; promising him payment if he fulfills his task. Her dogs, Curie, Fermi and Oppenheimer turn out to be a handful for him, despite Baymax reminding him to follow the guidebook given to them. Fermi runs away, resulting in Hiro getting his friends to take care of the other two. Eventually, Hiro gets Fermi back when Baymax finally consults the book. The dogs are returned to Granville, who pays him as promised, but Hiro is forced to give up the money to everyone, including Steamer for Oppenheimer taking his arm, for all the trouble he caused.
49	3	"Trading Chips"	Stephen Heneveld	Written by : Paiman Kalayeh; Storyboarded by : Karen Guo & Antony Mazzotta	October 5, 2020	0.12
49	3	"Mini Noodle Burger Max"	Kenji Ono	Written by : Ricky Roxburgh; Storyboarded by : Lior Lev & Ae Ri Yoon	October 5, 2020	0.12
"Trading Chips": Mini-Max suffers a humiliating defeat from Crushroom when she calls him a baby. Later, Mochi runs from home so that he will not go to the vet, but gets stuck in an air vent in a warehouse. Hiro has Baymax and Mini-Max switch chips so that a "Mini-Baymax" can go and save Mochi while a "Maxi-Max" joins Wasabi and Fred in facing off with Crushroom. Hiro and Cass eventually use the microbots to help Baymax rescue Mochi, while Mini-Max suffers another defeat. He learns to appreciate himself before switching back to his old body and defeating Crushroom this time, though she still escapes with Noodle Burger Boy. "Mini Noodle Burger Max": After a night of crime fighting, Baymax and Mini-Max are forced to recharge while the rest of the team take on Noodle Burger Boy and his family. A cave-in in an abandoned subway traps both teams in a flooding alcove, forcing Baymax and Mini-Max to team up with Noodle Burger Boy to rescue their respective groups. They decide to take Steamer's drill, but end up fighting him. As Baymax and Mini-Max's power wind down, Noodle Burger Boy is encouraged by family to share his power; defeating Steamer and using his drill to rescue everyone, though Big Hero 6 accidentally trap the robots again.
50	4	"A Friendly Face"	Trey Buongiorno	Written by : Paiman Kalayeh & Jeff Poliquin; Storyboarded by : Karen Guo & Antony Mazzotta	October 12, 2020	0.11
50	4	"Big Chibi 6"	Kenji Ono	Written by : Han-Yee Ling; Storyboarded by : Steve Hirt & Jenessa Warren	October 12, 2020	0.11
"A Friendly Face": Mayor Saito is concerned with Krei's idea for an A.I. transit system. Hiro brings in Honey Lemon to add a friendly face to the shuttle that runs on positivity. The new shuttle works incredibly well, but Noodle Burger Boy and his family arrive and steal it with Krei and Saito inside. Hiro, Baymax and Honey Lemon chase them to the dump where the shuttle gives the robot family a pep talk and willingly wishes to join them. Honey Lemon realizes she needs to be negative and the shuttle becomes dismal, draining the robots who flee. Saito turns down Krei and Honey Lemon invites the shuttle home, to Go Go's chagrin. "Big Chibi 6": Karmi has become a success with creating a webseries based on her Big Hero 6 fanfiction. Hiro is happy to learn that she is back in town for an autograph session and attends. Ian dons his Hardlight persona and crashes the signing by creating chibi duplicates of Big Hero 6. The team fight them in the street, but become overpowered when he makes more. Karmi, having learned about programming since moving away, aids the team in defeating Hardlight who is then unmasked and arrested. Afterwards, Hiro, in costume, and Karmi talk where it is implied that the latter has feelings for Hiro which seems to please him.
51	5	"Cobra and Mongoose"	Stephen Heneveld	Written by : Jeff Poliquin; Storyboarded by : Lior Lev & Ae Ri Yoon	October 26, 2020	0.10
51	5	"Better Off Fred"	Kenji Ono	Written by : Ricky Roxburgh; Storyboarded by : Sean Petrilak & Mike Tisserand	October 26, 2020	0.10
"Cobra and Mongoose": Fred is attacked by a robotic cobra that Heathcliff destroys. He then announces his intent to leave the Fredericksons as he is in danger. With Hiro's assistance, Fred follows Heathcliff and discovers that he has an arch-enemy named Cobra. Heathcliff was once a secret agent named Mongoose who with the help of Boss Awesome supposedly defeated Cobra, but she has returned to seek revenge. He warns Fred to stay away, but he and Mini-Max arrive to help Heathcliff regardless. With Hiro and Baymax's help they defeat Cobra once again and Fred convinces Heathcliff to come back and work for him. "Better Off Fred": Fred is heartbroken when he meets Olivia, a girl who shares his love of comics, but dislikes him as she is the cousin of Mole. Mole decides to help him be more approachable at a gala event. However, Olivia is more put off and Mole reveals that he was messing with Fred. The Supersonics arrive and Fred shows off his true self to save Olivia when she is taken hostage. As the Supersonics escape, Fred tells Olivia everything while Olivia reveals that Mole messed with her too; telling her that Fred was a jerk. They decide to go out while Mole, who was hiding from the big fight, remains trapped in a piano.
52	6	"Big Hero Battle"	Trey Buongiorno	Written by : Han-Yee Ling; Storyboarded by : Johnny Castuciano & Paulene Phouybanhdyt	November 2, 2020	0.09
52	6	"Go Go the Woweroo"	Stephen Heneveld	Written by : Paiman Kalayeh; Storyboarded by : Steve Hirt & Jenessa Warren	November 2, 2020	0.09
"Big Hero Battle": 4 2 Sing, a K-Pop group, decide to become superheroes and challenge Big Hero 6 to a superhero-off. Despite Big Hero 6's indifference, and Wasabi's love of the group, they are forced into it. While Big Hero 6 continue to stop crime, 4 2 Sing gets all the credit by posing and rack up points, effectively "beating" them. However while giving a concert, Steamer takes over 4 2 Sing's dragon transport with the music group failing to stop him. Big Hero 6 release Mega-Max and defeat Steamer. Afterwards, 4 2 Sing ineptly thank Big Hero 6 by throwing another concert with Wasabi excitedly dancing with them. "Go Go the Woweroo": Wendy Wower is convinced that someone is out to get her after receiving notes and asks Hiro, Baymax and Go Go for assistance. Hiro and Baymax decide to run through their database for leads while Go Go becomes Chelsea Cheery, Wendy's sidekick. Go Go initially dislikes performing for kids, but she warms up to it and discovers she likes educating. Hiro and Baymax believe that Supersonic Stu is the culprit, but he has an alibi. As Wendy and Go Go have a nice chat, they discover the culprit is a socially awkward boy who wants to be like them. As Go Go hugs him, Baymax glitches over seeing this.
53	7	"The New Nega-Globby"	Kenji Ono	Written by : Jeff Poliquin; Storyboarded by : Karen Guo & Antony Mazzotta	November 9, 2020	0.10
53	7	"De-Based"	Trey Buongiorno	Written by : Han-Yee Ling; Storyboarded by : Lior Lev & Ae Ri Yoon	November 9, 2020	0.10
"The New Nega-Globby": Globby keeps having nightmares about Nega-Globby. He visits Big Hero 6 where Honey Lemon deduces that he shares a psychic link with him and the group reluctantly agree to have her develop an artificial brain for Nega-Globby to remove his animalistic urges. Nega-Globby becomes well educated, but starts to act pompous and critical of everyone. After insulting him, he leaves, but becomes angry again and attacks the city. The heroes defeat him, but Globby does not want to put him away again as he sympathizes with him. Instead, they give him to Mole as they both enjoy each other's company. "De-Based": While at their lair, Fred ineptly opens a spam email that lets in a virus and takes over Basemax. The virus, named the Queen of Spamivia, begins to take over all electronics, including the training room robots, the Skymaxes, and soon Baymax and Mini-Max. The team gather together to try and shut down the power. While the main switch is destroyed, Hiro realizes he has to reach the main battery and shut it off. As Mega-Max attacks the group, Hiro desperately tries shutting the power off until Fred does so accidentally ending the threat. However, in Fred's ineptitude, he accidentally lets another virus in.
54	8	"The MiSFIT"	Johnny Castuciano & Stephen Heneveld	Written by : Ricky Roxburgh; Storyboarded by : Sean Petrilak & Mike Tisserand	February 1, 2021	0.14
54	8	"Return to Sycorax"	Kenji Ono	Written by : Paiman Kalayeh; Storyboarded by : Johnny Castuciano & Paulene Phouybanhdyt	February 1, 2021	0.14
"The MiSFIT": Granville calls Hiro to SFIT to help show around a potential student; 11-year-old Rishi Patel. Rishi is indifferent to SFIT and loves hacking into things, including Baymax, which annoys Hiro to no end. Nevertheless, Granville has faith in Hiro's efforts to convince Rishi to join. Meanwhile, Noodle Burger Boy and his family decide to try and take over SFIT and turn it into a robot school. Upon seeing Hiro battling the robots, Rishi suddenly becomes invested and uses his hacking skills to fight off the robots. Afterwards, he thanks Hiro for the tour and Granville assigns Hiro to be his mentor, much to his chagrin. "Return to Sycorax": Hiro, Baymax and Wasabi arrive at Fred's house for movie night. They suddenly get a call from Judy, Krei's assistant, who reveals that Krei bought the Sycorax building and has apparently gotten lost in it. The heroes arrive and search the labs where Fred mistakes a monster making machine for a microwave and puts his fast food in it. They find Krei, but they are attacked by the monster/fast food hybrids. Using the food pod robots to spurt vegetables, they manage to fight off the monsters and trap them again. Fred, who had been avoiding vegetables, accidentally eats some brussels sprouts, but finds that he likes them.
55	9	"A Fresh Sparkles"	Trey Buongiorno	Written by : Ricky Roxburgh; Storyboarded by : Steve Hirt & Jenessa Warren	February 8, 2021	0.10
55	9	"Noodle Burger Ploy"	Johnny Castuciano & Stephen Heneveld	Written by : Han-Yee Ling; Storyboarded by : Karen Guo & Anthony Mazzotta	February 8, 2021	0.10
"A Fresh Sparkles": Big Hero 6 is shocked to learn that Mr. Sparkles, going by his real name Frank, has recently been employed at the Pizza Party-torium and has turned over a new leaf. Not wanting to be seen as soft, Honey Lemon tries to out him, but he seems to have changed for the better. A painting is stolen and the team go searching for Mr. Sparkles. However, it is revealed that Yama had kidnapped him as revenge for outing him for his crimes. Honey Lemon doubles down on her attacks and defeats Yama while Mr. Sparkles returns the painting, proving that he has changed. Honey Lemon returns to her quirky bubbly self. "Noodle Burger Ploy": Fred answers an email that says he won a prize. He follows it and it turns out to be a trap by Noodle Burger Boy and his family who create a robot duplicate of Fred and send him out in the hopes of finding Big Hero 6's base and blowing it up. The rest of the team comically fail to recognize that Fred is not Fred as the robots get no closer to their goal. Eventually, El Fuego attacks a bank and the team fight him. When Noodle Burger Boy, in robot Fred's body, is about to be destroyed, the other robots fight El Fuego. Fred manages to escape and joins up to out Noodle Fred. The robots escape as the team come together.
56	10	"Krei-oke Night"	Trey Buongiorno	Written by : Bob Schooley & Mark McCorkle; Storyboarded by : Seam Petrilak & Mike Tisserand	February 15, 2021	0.07
56	10	"The Mascot Upshot"	Kenji Ono	Written by : Jeff Poliquin; Storyboarded by : Lior Lev & Ae Ri Yoon	February 15, 2021	0.07
"Krei-oke Night": Krei has developed his own karaoke machine, dubbed "krei-oke", and asks Big Hero 6 to help make the machine viable to potential customers. Meanwhile, Noodle Burger Boy and his family opt to steal a soundwave machine from Krei while the krei-oke show is taking place. During their robbery, various people go up and perform, though Krei is not getting any up votes. Eventually, Granville goes and performs just as the robots try to make off with the device. Big Hero 6 suit up and stop them. Krei's building is ruined and he only sold one unit; which went to Noodle Burger Boy, which annoys the other robots. "The Mascot Upshot": Noodle Burger Boy and his family are still on the hunt for a potential new recruit to join them. After another failure, they decide to hold auditions. Big Hero 6 catch on really quick and send in Mini-Max, in his evil guise, to go and join them. The robots are happy to have their new recruit and treat him like family. However, Mini-Max begins to feel guilty about betraying the robots. When the time comes, the robots reveal that they made a deal with Momakase and knew that Mini-Max would betray them. However, Hiro reveals that he made a deal with Momakase who turns on the robots and aids the heroes in stopping and removing the evil Obake chips from them. Afterwards, the robots are reprogrammed and now work for Cass, whom they call mom, and are part of the Big Hero 6 family as the series ends.

== Shorts ==
=== Baymax and ===
A series of short-form episodes began airing on the Disney Channel YouTube channel on May 31, 2018, though they premiered in Europe months earlier.

No.	Title	Original release date
1	"Baymax and Fred"	May 31, 2018 (Note: This short premiered in Sweden on November 24, 2017.)
2	"Baymax and Go Go"	June 1, 2018 (Note: This short premiered in Sweden on January 11, 2018.)
3	"Baymax and Wasabi"	June 6, 2018 (Note: This short premiered in Sweden on January 18, 2018.)
4	"Baymax and Hiro"	June 14, 2018 (Note: This short premiered in Sweden on February 1, 2018.)
5	"Baymax and Mochi"	June 18, 2018 (Note: This short premiered in the United Kingdom on January 13, 2018.)
6	"Baymax and Honey Lemon"	June 20, 2018 (Note: This short premiered in the United Kingdom on January 8, 2018.)

=== Baymax Dreams ===
A three-episode short series called Baymax Dreams premiered on September 15, 2018 simultaneously on Disney Channel and YouTube. The episodes are computer-animated and made through Unity. A second order of episodes was announced, this time featuring a digital Fred interacting with Baymax.

No.	Title	Original release date
1	"Baymax Dreams of Too Many Baymaxes!"	September 15, 2018
2	"Baymax Dreams of Evil Sheep!"	September 15, 2018
3	"Baymax Dreams of Bed Bugs!"	September 15, 2018
4	"Baymax Dreams of Mochizilla"	August 8, 2020
5	"Baymax Dreams of Too Many Freds"	August 15, 2020
6	"Baymax Dreams of Fred's Glitch"	February 6, 2021

=== Big Chibi 6 The Shorts ===
In early November 2018, Disney Channel started airing Big Chibi 6 The Shorts, a series loosely based on the opening segment from the episode "Fan Friction". This series depicts the cast of Big Hero 6 in comical "chibi-fied" situations. The chibi animation is used in the closing credits of season 2 and season 3 episodes. Following the release of the series, "chibi-fied" shorts based on other Disney Channel titles, such as Amphibia and Phineas and Ferb were released, known as Chibi Tiny Tales. This was followed by a full fledged monthly television series titled Chibiverse.

No.	Title	Original release date
1	"Making Popcorn"	November 6, 2018
2	"Mochi No!"	November 13, 2018
3	"Save Mochi"	November 20, 2018
4	"Noodle Song"	November 20, 2018
5	"Snoring"	November 27, 2018
6	"Gumball Trouble"	February 5, 2019
7	"Love Letters"	February 12, 2019
8	"Super Charged"	February 19, 2019
9	"Low Battery"	April 2, 2019
10	"Road Trip"	April 9, 2019
11	"Super Driver"	April 16, 2019
12	"Brunch Rush"	April 23, 2019

=== Baymax & Mochi ===
During the premiere of season two, a new series started called Baymax & Mochi. This series solely focuses on the titular duo and is done with cel shading.

No.	Title	Original release date
1	"Flowers and Butterflies"	May 6, 2019
2	"Mochi and his Toy"	May 14, 2019
3	"Messy Room"	May 21, 2019

=== Disney Random Rings ===
Short segments that originated from Big City Greens that feature Disney Channel characters calling one another and set to Adobe Flash animation. There are several other Disney Random Rings shorts, but this is the first to feature characters from Big Hero 6: The Series.

No.	Title	Original release date
19 (Note: Number represents its order in the Disney Random Rings series.)	"Baymax Helps Launchpad"	June 29, 2020

== Ratings ==
Viewership and ratings per season of List of Big Hero 6: The Series episodes
Season	Episodes	First aired		Last aired		Avg. viewers (millions)
Season	Episodes	Date	Viewers (millions)	Date	Viewers (millions)	Avg. viewers (millions)
1	22	November 20, 2017	1.11	October 13, 2018	0.51	0.62
2	23	May 6, 2019	0.21	February 8, 2020	TBD	0.22
3	10	September 21, 2020	0.12	February 15, 2021	0.07	0.10
