= You and Me Kid =

- Cover of VHS release
- Presented by: Sonny Melendrez
- Country of origin: United States
- Original language: English
- No. of episodes: 130

Production
- Production company: Walt Disney Productions

Original release
- Network: The Disney Channel
- Release: April 18, 1983 – 1986

You and Me Kid is an American children's television series which premiered on The Disney Channel at launch on April 18, 1983. The series was hosted by Sonny Melendrez who was joined by the You and Me Players (Toni Attell, Caleb Chung, Mitchell Young Evans, Gary Schwartz and Ricci Mann). Each show lasted approximately 30 minutes and was dedicated to building interactive skills between parents and their toddler children. The shows contained five segments:

- Let's Go! (exercise skills)
- You and Me Theater (creative drama)
- Famous and 1/2 (celebrities and their children)
- Shh! (listening and observation skills)
- Mime Your Own Business (pantomime)

The Famous and 1/2 (celebrities and their children) segments were directed by Ron Underwood and Susan Marangell on alternating episodes.

Its theme song was Just You and Me, Kid, by Robin Frederick. The show ended with Sonny and the You and Me Players singing "Loving Together, Living Together", followed by the closing theme.

The show ran for 130 episodes and reruns continued to air on the channel until September 29, 1991.

Four VHS tapes and Betamax tapes were released by Walt Disney Home Video in the mid-1980s for the then new video home rental market. Each tape contained four episodes and have since become hard to find.

In 1988, a store with the same name opened at Disney Village Marketplace which sold children's apparel, games and toys.

Preceded by Good Morning, Mickey!	Disney Channel Original Series	Succeeded by Welcome to Pooh Corner
