= List of programmes broadcast by Disney Channel (United Kingdom and Ireland) =

This is a list of programmes shown or removed before the closure on Disney Channel in the UK and Ireland. The first programme to be aired on the channel on 1 October 1995 was the 1967 movie The Jungle Book.

However, on 30 September 2020, due to the launch of Disney+ in the region, the channel closed down with the final programme shown being the 2019 film Descendants 3.

== Final programmes ==
Sources:

- Bunk'd (20 November 2015 − 29 September 2020)
- The Evermoor Chronicles (10 October 2014 − 30 September 2020)
- Good Luck Charlie (12 June 2010 − 30 September 2020)
- Jessie (29 January 2012 − 29 September 2020)
- K.C. Undercover (27 March 2015 − 29 September 2020)
- Liv & Maddie (7 October 2013 − 29 September 2020)
- The Lodge (23 September 2016 − 30 September 2020)
- Miraculous: Tales of Ladybug & Cat Noir (30 January 2016 − 30 September 2020, now on Pop)
- Penny on M.A.R.S. (4 June 2018 − 30 September 2020)
- Raven's Home (28 July 2017 − 29 September 2020)
- Stuck in the Middle (15 April 2016 − 29 September 2020)
- Violetta (22 July 2013 − 30 September 2020)

== Former programmes ==
=== Original programming ===
- 101 Dalmatians: The Series (1999 − 2004)
- 101 Dalmatian Street (14 December 2018 − 1 April 2020)
- The 7D (7 January − 30 June 2017)
- A.N.T. Farm (2011 − 14 December 2017)
- Access All Areas (19 September 2017)
- Adventures in Wonderland
- Adventures of the Gummi Bears (November 1997 −2001)
- Aladdin (1997−2006)
- American Dragon: Jake Long (5 January 2005 − 9 March 2009)
- Amphibia (6 July 2019)
- Andi Mack (14 July 2017 − 30 August 2019)
- As the Bell Rings (26 January 2008 − 22 February 2011)
- Austin & Ally (20 April 2012 − 13 July 2018)
- Best Friends Whenever (8 January 2016 − 28 May 2017)
- Big City Greens (12 November 2018 − 28 April 2019)
- Billy Dilley's Super-Duper Subterranean Summer (8 May - 29 December 2017)
- Bizaardvark (4 November 2016 − 27 September 2019; 5 September−27, 2020)
- Bonkers (June−November 1997)
- Bonus Jonas
- Brian O'Brian (15 September 2008 − 22 April 2010)
- Brandy & Mr. Whiskers (8 November 2004 − 22 May 2010)
- Bug Juice: My Adventures at Camp (30 July − 1 September 2018)
- Bus Life
- The Buzz on Maggie (26 June 2005 −2007)
- Buzz Lightyear of Star Command (2001−2003)
- Cars Toons (27 October 2008 − 26 May 2015)
- Chip 'n Dale: Rescue Rangers (2 October 1995 −1998)
- Club Penguin Shorts (1 October − 5 November 2012)
- Code: 9 (12 January − 18 May 2013)
- Coop and Cami Ask the World (26 November 2018 − 27 September 2020)
- Cory in the House (27 January 2007 − 12 February 2011)
- Disney's CyberStar
- Darkwing Duck
- Dave the Barbarian (2004−2008)
- Descendants: Wicked World (18 July 2016 − 1 November 2017)
- Disney Channel DJ
- Disney Channel Games
- Disney Consumer Arcade
- Disney Villains
- Disney's Classic Toons (1999−2004)
- Dog with a Blog (2 December 2012 − 8 January 2017)
- Donald's Quack Attack (2 October 1995 −1997)
- Doug (1996−2000)
- DuckTales (original series) (2 October 1995)
- DuckTales (2017) (4 November 2017 − 9 June 2019) (also aired on Disney XD 30 November 2017 – 30 September 2020)
- Dumbo's Circus (2 October 1995 −1997)
- The Emperor's New School (2006−2010)
- The Famous Jett Jackson (1999−2001)
- Fillmore! (6 January 2003 − 11 March 2008)
- First Class Chefs (22 June 2015)
- Fish Hooks (6 November 2010 − 19 July 2014)
- Flash Forward (1997−1998)
- Gabby Duran & the Unsittables (25 October 2019 − 31 August 2020)
- Gargoyles (1997−2001)
- Get the Look (17 September 2010 − 25 June 2014)
- Girl Meets World (29 August 2014 − 27 September 2019)
- Goof Troop (1997−2004)
- Gravity Falls (7 September 2012 − 26 May 2017)
- Groove high (10 November 2012 − 1 September 2017)
- Hannah Montana (6 May 2006 − 30 November 2018)
- Hannah-Oke (15 May 2009)
- Have a Laugh (9 August 2011 − 28 March 2013)
- Hercules (1999−2004)
- High School Musical: The Music in You
- Honey, I Shrunk the Kids: The TV Show (23 November 1997 −2004)
- House of Mouse (2001− 19 March 2009)
- I Didn't Do It (22 April 2014 − 30 September 2016)
- In a Heartbeat (2001−2003)
- I Got a Rocket
- The Jersey
- Jonas L.A. (11 September 2009 − 18 March 2012)
- Jungle Cubs (November 1997 −2003)
- Just Roll with It (9 August 2019 − 27 September 2020)
- Kim Possible (4 November 2002 − 19 July 2011; 21 March − 17 December 2014; 3 April 2017 − 29 January 2018; 1 January − 1 July 2019)
- Kirby Buckets (9 January 2015 − 22 December 2016)
- Lab Rats (27 June 2016 − 16 July 2017)
- Lab Rats: Elite Force (16 April − 28 June 2018)
- The Legend of Tarzan (2001−2006)
- Life Bites (6 September 2008)
- Lilo & Stitch (20 October 2003 − 4 October 2008; 22 January − 9 July 2014)
- The Little Mermaid (January 1997 −2008)
- Lizzie McGuire (3 September 2001 − 20 March 2011, moved to Pop Girl)
- Lloyd in Space (4 June 2001 −2004)
- Mad Libs
- Marsupilami
- Mickey Mouse (12 July 2013 − 17 December 2017, moved to Disney XD)
- Mickey Mouse and Friends (later entitled as Classic Toons)
- Mickey Mouseworks (1999−2001)
- Mickey's Mouse Tracks
- Milo Murphy's Law (3 April − 30 December 2017, now on Disney XD)
- Mighty Ducks (1996−1998)
- My Camp Rock
- MECH-X4 (19 June − 12 July 2017)
- Nightmare Ned (November 1997)
- Off the Wall
- The Owl House (10 August − 4 September 2020)
- The Proud Family (21 January 2002 − 25 September 2007)
- Pepper Ann (November 1997 −2003)
- Phil of the Future (2004 − 22 September 2010)
- Phineas and Ferb (2007−2015)
- PrankStars (25 November − 16 December 2011)
- Quack Pack (1997−2003)
- Rapunzel's Tangled Adventure (formerly known in its first season as Tangled: The Series) (21 July 2017 – 23 March 2020)
- Raw Toonage
- Recess (November 1997 − 19 July 2011)
- The Replacements (3 February 2007 − 11 March 2011)
- Royal Ranch (20 November 2017)
- Sadie Sparks (20 April 2019 −2020, now on Pop)
- Shake It Up (10 November 2010 − 30 June 2017)
- So Random! (31 October 2011 − 5 August 2013; 9 February − 2 March 2017)
- So Weird
- Sonny with a Chance (8 February 2009 − 28 January 2018)
- Studio Disney UK (1 September 1997 −2005 (main run) / September− November 2001 (second-run shorts))
- The Suite Life of Zack & Cody (23 August 2005 − 13 August 2010; 9 July 2014; 30 January − 24 November 2018)
- Suite Life on Deck (19 September 2008 − 9 February 2017)
- Sydney to the Max (8 April 2019 − 27 September 2020)
- TaleSpin (1997−1999)
- Teacher's Pet (2001−2004)
- Teamo Supremo
- That's So Raven (4 September 2002 − 22 March 2012; 12 March − 9 September 2015; 25 April 2016 − 2 September 2018)
- Timon & Pumbaa (1997−2004)
- Toy Story Toons (20 April 2012 − 27 May 2014)
- The Weekenders (2000−2004)
- Walk the Prank (10 October−27, 2016)
- Welcome to Pooh Corner (2 October 1995 − June 1997)
- Win, Lose or Draw (5 May − 4 August 2014)
- Wizards of Waverly Place (3 November 2007 − 30 November 2018)
- The Wuzzles

=== Programming from Playhouse Disney/Disney Junior ===
NOTE: This list also features acquired programming that were actually aired on the block.

- 64 Zoo Lane (2000−2004, now airing on Sky Kids)
- The Adventures of Spot (1999−2004)
- Art Play (1999−2003)
- Bear in the Big Blue House (1998−2008)
- Bite Size (1999−2003)
- The Book of Pooh (2001−2007)
- Bunnytown
- Circle Time (1999−2003)
- Connie the Cow
- Doc McStuffins (18 November 2014 −2018)
- Elena of Avalor (15 July 2016 − 3 February 2020)
- Higglytown Heroes
- Jasper
- JoJo's Circus
- Mickey Mouse Clubhouse
- Music Time (1999−2003)
- My Friends Tigger & Pooh
- The New Adventures of Winnie the Pooh (2 October 1995 −2004)
- Out of the Box (1999−2006)
- PB&J Otter (1999−2008)
- Rolie Polie Olie (1999−2007)
- Sing Me a Story with Belle (1996−2004)
- Sofia the First (18 November 2014 − 29 June 2018)
- Stanley (2002–2009)

=== Interstitial programming from Studio Disney UK ===
These shorts was aired during Studio Disney UK's runtime, from 3pm to 7pm, mostly they were aired on Monday to Friday.

- Alfred
- Alien Vacation
- How Things Work?
- Joypad
- Junior Journo
- Kids Awards Update
- Tex Tinstar
- Who Knows?
- Wish Upon a Star

=== Acquired programming ===
- 100 Deeds for Eddie McDowd (2000−2003)
- 8 Simple Rules (2003−2004, moved to ABC1)
- The Adventures of Sam
- Amazing Animals (November 1997 −1999)
- Animal Shelf
- Art Attack (1999−2011, formerly also aired on CITV)
- Audubon's Animals
- Backstage (9 May 2016 − 24 May 2018)
- Beany and Cecil
- Best Bugs Forever (Saturday 15 June 2019 − Monday 3 February 2020)
- The Big Garage (June−November 1997)
- Bill Nye the Science Guy
- Blossom (November 1997)
- Bone Chillers
- Boy Meets World (2 October 1995 −2007)
- Brotherly Love (January 1997 −2001, moved to ABC1)
- Caitlin's Way (2000− 2003)
- The Care Bears (January−June 1997)
- Counterfeit Cat (12 May 2016)
- Crash Zone (April− late 1999)
- Daddio (2002−2003, moved to ABC1)
- Danger Bay (2 October 1995 − July 1997)
- Dangerous Minds (4 January 1997)
- Dave's World (January−November 1997)
- Deepwater Haven
- Dinosaurs (2 October 1995 −2003)
- Dr. Quinn, Medicine Woman (November 1997 −2001)
- Enid Blyton's Adventure Series
- Eyewitness
- Faerie Tale Theatre (1995− November 1997)
- Famous 5: On the Case (16 September 2008 − 30 April 2013)
- Flipper (November 1997 −2001)
- Fraggle Rock (2 October 1995 − June 1997, also aired on Nickelodeon)
- Generation O!
- The Golden Girls (January−June 1997)
- Go Away, Unicorn! (7 January 2019 − 4 January 2020)
- Groundling Marsh (January−November 1997)
- Home Improvement (November 1997 −2004, moved to ABC1)
- Hotel Transylvania: The Series (4 August 2017 − 8 September 2019)
- How to Be Indie (2 October 2009 − 6 June 2013)
- I Got a Rocket!
- Incredible Story Studios (1999−2001)
- Inside Clyde (25 January 2004 −2005)
- Jumanji (2002−2003)
- L.A. 7
- Lamb Chop's Playalong!
- Let's Wiggle!
- Life's Work (1 January 1997)
- Like Family (September 2004)
- Little Hippo
- Men in Black (1998−2001)
- Miami 7
- Microscopic Milton (November 1997 −1998)
- Microsoap
- The Monkees (formerly also aired on Nickelodeon)
- Monster by Mistake
- Mr. Young (21 September 2013 − 22 April 2014)
- Muppet Babies (2 October 1995 − June 1997, moved to Nickelodeon)
- My Babysitter's a Vampire (4 October 2011 − 28 March 2014)
- My Best Friend Is an Alien (2000−2003)
- Ned's Newt (1998−1999)
- Overruled! (10 July 2009)
- The Poddington Peas
- Ratz
- The Raoul Show
- Rolling with the Ronks! (22 July 2017 – 31 December 2017)
- Rosie and Jim (November 1997 −1998)
- S Club 7 Go Wild!
- Sabrina: The Animated Series (1999−2007, moved to Pop Girl)
- Sabrina's Secret Life (2004−2006, moved to Pop Girl)
- Second Noah (November 1997 −1998)
- Sesame Street (November 1997 −1998)
- Sherlock Holmes in the 22nd Century
- Short Cuts
- The Sinbad Show (moved to ABC1)
- Smart Guy (November 1997 −2006)
- The Spooky Sisters
- Spot the Ball
- Student Bodies
- Sweet Valley High (2001−2003)
- Teen Angel (1998−2006)
- Thunder Alley (2 October 1995, moved to ABC1)
- Thunderstone (1999−2000)
- The Torkelsons
- Tots TV (November 1997 −1998)
- Touched by an Angel (5 January 1997 −2003)
- Two of a Kind (2002−2003, moved to Pop Girl)
- Under the Umbrella Tree (2 October 1995 − November 1997)
- Untalkative Bunny (2001−2003)
- The Wacky World of Tex Avery
- The Wayne Manifesto
- The Wonder Years (original series) (November 1997 −2000)
- Woof (November 1997 −1998)
- The ZhuZhus (30 January 2017 – 1 January 2018)
