= Mia Jenkins =

English actress (born 2000)

- Born: Mia Iris Jenkins; 31 August 2000 (age 25); Feltham, London, England
- Education: Sylvia Young Theatre School
- Occupation: Actress
- Years active: 2004–present

Mia Iris Jenkins (born 31 August 2000) is an English actress. She is known for her roles as Alex in the Disney Channel musical drama The Lodge and Emma in the Disney Channel series Soy Luna. Following her appearances on Disney programmes, Jenkins has made various appearances in television series and films, including the Amazon Prime Video series Hanna, the BBC Three series Mood and the Sky Atlantic series Domina.

== Career ==
Jenkins made her professional acting debut at the age of four in a touring production of Joseph and His Technicolour Dreamcoat. At age five, she played Gretl Von Trapp for two runs in the West End production of The Sound of Music. at the London Palladium. In 2007, at the age of six, Jenkins made her television debut in an episode of the Channel 5 series Hanrahan Investigates, as Kelly Bicknell. Following this, she continued her acting career, playing the role of Little Eponine, and subsequently Little Cosette in two consecutive runs of Les Misérables at the West End's Queen's Theatre. She went on to play Little Cosette again in 2010, at both the Barbican Theatre and in the production of Les Misérables in Concert: The 25th Anniversary. The production was originally performed and filmed at The O2 Arena, and later shown in cinemas across the UK. As a child, she had roles in numerous other West End productions, including Matilda, Scrooge, The Wizard of Oz and Gone With the Wind. She also toured the UK with productions including Chitty Chitty Bang Bang, and Annie.

In 2012, she portrayed the role of Phoebe in City Slacker; an independent film. That same year, she portrayed the role of Mia Taylor in the film Secrets and Words. She went on to play roles in Casualty and Necktie, a short film directed by Yorgos Lanthimos. In 2016, Jenkins appeared in the BBC soap opera EastEnders. She portrayed the recurring role of Hannah Reynolds for four episodes. In 2017, she starred in the Disney Channel musical drama The Lodge. She appeared in a total of 15 episodes, portraying the role of Alex. Later in 2017, Jenkins starred in the Disney Channel miniseries, Royal Ranch as Finny. The show premiered on the Disney Channel app and YouTube channel on 20 November 2017.

In 2017 and 2019, Jenkins appeared in the BBC Radio 4 sitcom The Wilsons Save the World, where she portrayed the role of Cat Wilson. In 2018, Jenkins had a recurring role in the third series of the Disney Channel series Soy Luna. In 2020, Jenkins filmed as lead character Amy Haines in the horror film The Piper. Jenkins then played the lead role in the short film Tiny Dancer, as well as featuring as a recurring character in the Prime Video series Hanna. In 2022, Jenkins appeared as a recurring character in BBC Three series Mood. In 2023, she appeared as Ursa, a recurring character in the Sky Atlantic drama Domina. It was announced in 2024 that Jenkins would be appearing as Lexi in the Netflix series Geek Girl. In 2026, she starred in the romantic drama film Love Me Love Me.

== Filmography ==
=== Film ===
Year	Title	Role	Notes
2010	Les Misérables in Concert: The 25th Anniversary	Young Cosette	
2012	City Slacker	Phoebe	
2013	Necktie		Short film
2021	Tiny Dancer	Hope	Short film
2023	The Piper	Amy Haines	
2025	The Stained Stainlessman	Lucy Green	Short film
2026	Love Me Love Me	June	

=== Television ===
Year	Title	Role	Notes
2012	Secrets and Words	Mia Taylor	Episode: "The Crossing"
2014	Casualty	Laura	Episode: "Only the Lonely"
2016	EastEnders	Hannah Reynolds	Guest role
2017	The Lodge	Alex	Main role
2017	Royal Ranch	Finny	Main role
2018	Bliss	Troubled 16-Year-Old Girl	1 episode
2018	Soy Luna	Emma	Recurring role
2020	Hanna	Danielle Marks	Recurring role
2022	Mood	Megan	Recurring role
2023	Domina	Ursa	Recurring role
2024	Geek Girl	Lexi Roberts	Recurring role

== Stage ==
Year	Title	Role	Venue	Notes
	The Jungle Book	Baby Mowgli		with Fame Factory
	Snow White and the Seven Dwarfs	Babe		With Bill Kenwright Ltd.
2004	Joseph and the Amazing Technicolor Dreamcoat	Choir	New Wimbledon Theatre, London	
2006	The Sound of Music	Gretl von Trapp	London Palladium, London	
2008	Gone with the Wind	Bonnie Blue	New London Theatre, London	
2009	Chitty Chitty Bang Bang	Jemima Potts	UK Tour	
2010	Les Misérables	Young Cosette	The O2 Arena, London	25th Anniversary Concert
2011	Annie	Orphan	UK Tour	
2011	Les Misérables	Young Cosette / Young Éponine	Barbican Centre, London	
2011	The Wizard of Oz	Munchkin	London Palladium, London	
2011	Jack and the Beanstalk		Shaw Theatre, London	
2012	Scrooge	Pickwick	London Palladium, London	
2012	Matilda the Musical	Alice	Cambridge Theatre, London	
2013	The Sound of Music	Louisa von Trapp	Regent's Park Open Air Theatre, London	
