= Amy Wren =

British actress

- Born: 14 October 1989 (age 36); Leicestershire, England
- Occupation: Actress
- Years active: 2005–present

Amy Wren (born 14 October 1989) is an English actress. She is best known for her roles in the Disney series Life Bites, Silk (TV series), Skins (British TV series), The Last Kingdom (TV series) and Viewpoint (TV series).

== Personal life ==
Wren attended Parsnips Youth Theatre in Harborough for four years. She was featured in the Mail in July 2006, when she and two others from Parsnips were chosen to be a part of the National Youth Theatre.

== Career ==
Wren started acting when she was talent spotted by Disney UK at the age of 16. She was then engaged for Disney’s comedy sketch show Life Bites, playing the lead role as Chloe. She moved onto working with Nickelodeon in Genie In The House and Summer in Transylvania. In 2010 she appeared in Andrea Arnold's film adaptation of Emily Brontë’s novel Wuthering Heights, in which she played Frances Earnshaw. In 2016 she played Lady Evelyn Herbert in Guy Burt's TV mini-series Tutankhamun which is the story of the archeologist Howard Carter, who discovered the tomb of Tutankhamun.

== Filmography ==
Year	Film	Role	Notes
2008	Life Bites	Chloe	TV series, 49 episodes
2009	Genie in the House	Diana	TV series, 1 episode
2010	Casualty	Kelly Oswald	TV series, 1 episode
2010	Summer in Transylvania	Heidi	TV series, 20 episodes
2011
2011	Life of Riley	Bea	TV series, 1 episode
2011	Wuthering Heights	Frances Earnshaw	
2012	Silk	Bethany	TV series, 13 episodes
2012	Silent Witness	Shannon Kelly	TV series, 2 episodes
2013	uwantme2killhim?	Zoey	
2013	Skins	Jane	TV series, 2 episodes
2013	S.L.R.	Alexa	Short film
2014	Boreb	Older	Short film
2014	Silk: The Clerks' Room	Bethany	BBC R4 series
2015	The Last Kingdom	Mildrith	TV series, 4 episodes
2016	Tutankhamun	Lady Evelyn Herbert	TV mini-series, 4 episodes
2017	Little Women	Sallie Gardiner	Miniseries; 1 episode
2021	Viewpoint	Gemma Hillman	TV Miniseries; 5 episodes
TBA	A Matter of Time †	TBA	Filming
