= Ribi =

Ribi is a surname. Notable people with the surname include:

- David Ribi (born 1987), English actor
- Martha Ribi (1915–2010), Swiss politician
