= David Ribi =

English actor

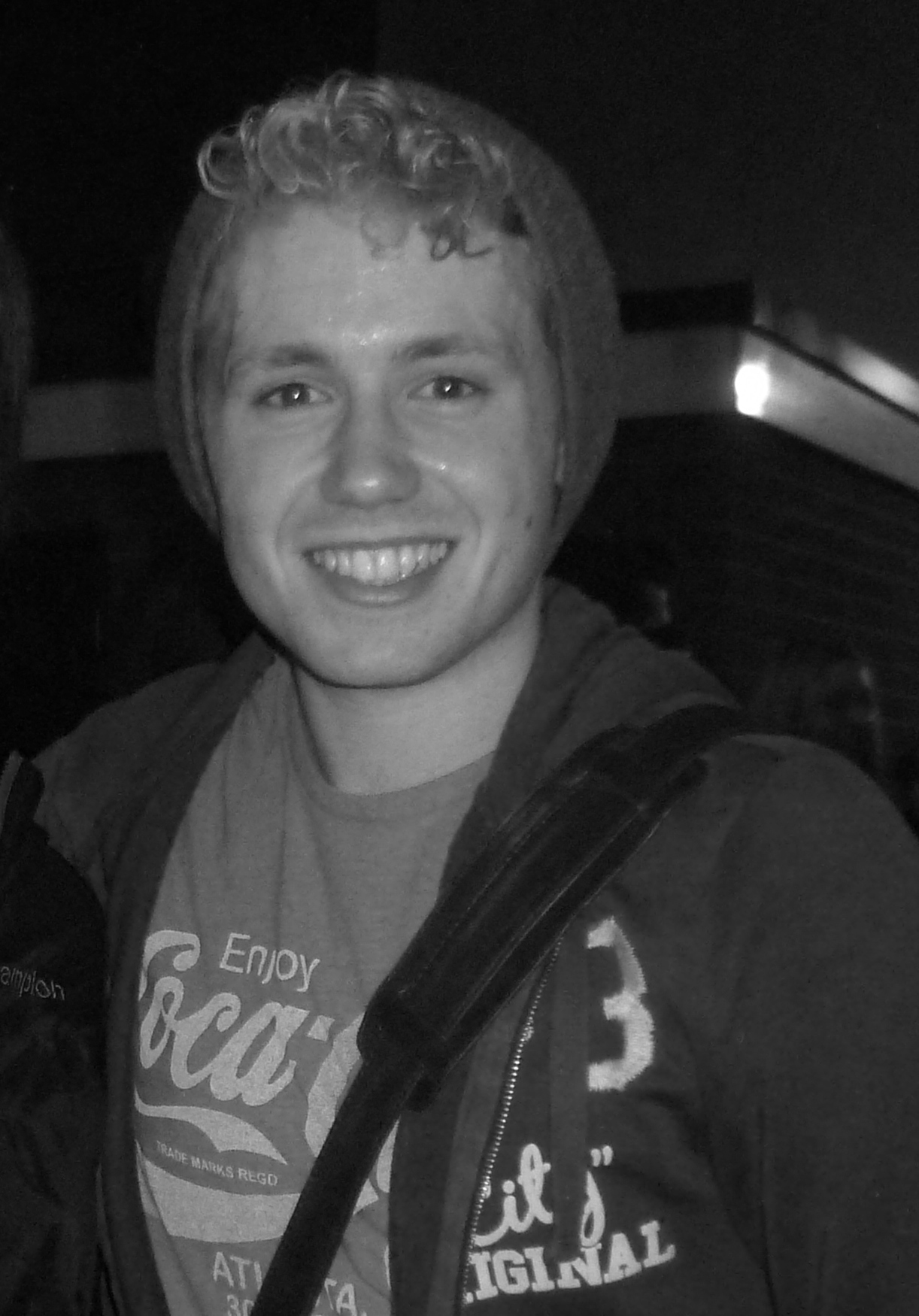
- David Ribi at the stage door after performing as "Sketch" in the UK tour of Hairspray.
- Born: 1 August 1987 (age 38); Camberley, Surrey, England
- Occupations: Actor and singer songwriter
- Years active: 2008-present

David Ribi (born 1 August 1987) is an English actor best known for presenting the preschool children's television block Milkshake! on Channel 5. He is also known for his roles in West End Theatre and touring productions. He trained in musical theatre at the YEM Theatre School until 2006, and studied Drama and Theatre at Royal Holloway until 2009.

As well as being a television presenter and actor, Ribi is also a singer-songwriter, music producer, and session singer, and has performs with his vocal groups 'Triptonic' and 'Three Kings' all over the world.

== Career ==
=== Theatre ===
Ribi has a number of theatre credits. Whilst training, he appeared in several leading roles, including 'Tommy' in The Who's Tommy, and 'Tobias Ragg' in Sweeney Todd: The Demon Barber of Fleet Street, among others (see below).

In 2011, it was announced that Ribi would play the lead role of 'Bobby' in the 2011-2012 Dreamboats and Petticoats UK Tour, produced by Bill Kenwright. Upon the completion of the tour, Ribi took up the same lead role of Bobby in the West End version of the show at the Playhouse Theatre, and then the Wyndhams Theatre, which ran until 4 August 2012.

From 13 December 2012 until 6 January 2013, Ribi starred as Aladdin in the pantomime of the same name at the Octagon Theatre, Yeovil.

In 2013, Ribi joined the cast of the UK tour of Hairspray as 'Sketch' and second cover Link Larkin. The tour ran from 11 February 2013 until 29 September 2013.

Ribi returned to panto during the 2013/2014 Christmas season, playing the lead role of Peter Pan in the pantomime of the same name, at Fairfield Hall, Croydon, alongside Steve McFadden (Captain Hook). The show ran from 6 December 2013 until 5 January 2014.

In May 2014, it was announced that Ribi would be taking on the lead role of 'Zanna' in 'Zanna, Don't!' from 3–29 June at the Landor Theatre, London. The story in which Ribi serves as the lead (Zanna) is set in a parallel universe where homosexuality is the norm and heterosexuality is a taboo. Set in mid-west America, "Zanna" takes place at heterophobic Heartsville High. Zanna is the school's matchmaker, bringing together happy couples until the football team's quarterback and the captain of the Girls' Intramural Mechanical Bull-Riding Team begin to discover their feelings for each other.

Following his success in Zanna, Don't!, Ribi announced that he would play "Man 1" in I Love You, You're Perfect! Now Change! at the Battersea Barge from 14 to 17 July 2014.

In 2015, Ribi joined the European Tour of 'The Rocky Horror Show' as Leading man "Brad Majors". The production toured all of Germany, Austria, Luxembourg and much of Italy and Switzerland. Produced by BB Promotion this version of the show is renowned across Europe as a cult hit.

In February 2016, Ribi joined the cast of Mamma Mia on its first ever UK Tour, as first cover Sky. The tour ran for a year, until February 2017.

=== Music ===
Ribi is a keen singer/songwriter and has written his own music, which can be found on his YouTube channel. His debut album is due to be released later this year.

On 10 December 2012, a single "Onesie Time" was released on iTunes, co-written by Ribi, and featuring his vocals, along with those of other notable names such as West End performers Samantha Dorrance (Dreamboats and Petticoats), Sabrina Aloueche (We Will Rock You), Tim Driesen (Rock of Ages) and Christopher Biggins, collectively dubbed 'The West End Onesie Club' - all performers wore onesies throughout the recording process.

=== Television ===
Ribi has become a morning TV staple across the UK as a presenter of the Channel 5 preschool children's television block 'Milkshake!', where he has worked since May 2017 to present. The show broadcasts every morning from 6am, 365 days a year.

Ribi has made appearances on several UK television shows. His first was in March 2012, with the cast of Dreamboats and Petticoats on the BBC TV Series The Late Show. They performed "Let's Go To The Hop", a musical number from the show. In February 2013, Ribi appeared on the ITV daytime show This Morning with the cast of the UK tour of Hairspray. They performed "You Can't Stop The Beat", the finale song from Act 2 of the show.

=== Only One Direction ===
In early 2012, Only One Direction formed as a tribute band to the teen sensations One Direction, the first of its kind in the world. The tribute band was an instant hit, attracting nationwide attention which led to the band performing up to seven shows a week. The band performed to over 150000 audience members in its first two years, quickly establishing its presence in the music industry. The band initially consisted of five members, Henry Allan (portraying One Direction member Harry Styles), Jamie SEARLS (Zayn Malik), Andy Fowler (Louis Tomlinson), Aaron Foster (Liam Payne), and Matt Brinkler (Niall Horan), but due to high demand for performances, the band expanded in 2013, bringing alternates to perform at some of the shows. David Ribi, described on the band's website (along with the other alternates) as "the best of the best in performing talent", joined the band as an alternate Niall Horan. He has toured internationally with the band, showcasing his musical ability. Throughout 2014, demand for Ribi and the band continues to be high, allowing for their first UK theatre tour, United Arab Emirates tour, and the continuation of their European residencies.

== Personal life ==
Ribi is gay and has a boyfriend.

== Music and theatre credits ==
Music and theatre
Start year	Production	Role	Notes
2008	Sweeny Todd: The Demon Barber of Fleet Street	Tobias Ragg	Directed by Phil Hooks
2008	The Who's Tommy	Tommy	Directed by Thomas Warren; Student Union RHMT, RHUL
2009	The Voice of Tomorrow	Soloist - First Placing Male.	Directed by Nick Murdoch for Murdoch Scott Productions; The Bloomsbury Theatre, London.
2009	RENT	Roger Davis (Lead)	Directed by Tim Churchill; The Regent Theatre, Stoke-on-Trent
2009	Nursery Crimes	Gingerbread Man/Bobby Shaftoe	Directed by Lauren Hillier for Wave The Stick Productions; The King's Head Theatre, London
2009	Dick Whittington	King Rat	Directed by Nick Young; South England Tour
2010	The Distance We Have Come - The Music of Scott Alan (concert)	Soloist	Directed by Scott Alan for Damson Productions; The New Players Theatre, London
2010	Waterloo!	Benny	MD George Dyer; Theatre Tour; Mad About Productions - UK National Tour; Directed by Michael Courtney
2010	Shakin All Over	Frankie Valli/Buddy Holly/Ensemble/Dancer	Directed by Michael Courtney; Mad About Productions - UK National Tour
2011	Heaven Sent	Dave	Directed by Helmi Fagin; Hidden Talent Productions; New Wimbledon Theatre Studio.
2011	Dreamboats and Petticoats (UK Tour)	Bobby (Lead)	Directed by Bob Tomson for Bill Kenwright Productions
2012	Dreamboats and Petticoats (West End)	Bobby (Lead)	Wyndhams Theatre, London; Closed 4 August 2012.
2012 - 2013	Aladdin (Panto)	Aladdin (Lead)	Octagon Theatre, Yeovil; Ran from Thursday 13 December 2012 until Sunday 6 January 2013.
2013	Hairspray (UK Tour)	Sketch/2nd Cover Link Larkin	2013 UK Touring Production.; Directed by Jack O'Brien
2013	West End Fest	Soloist and 'band member'.	St. Pauls Church, Covent Garden, London; West End Fest 2013 took place on 14 July 2013.; David sang "What Makes You Beautiful" by One Direction as part of a "West End Boyband", and also a mash-up of songs from the musical Annie'.
2013–2014	Only One Direction (Tribute Band)	Niall Horan.	UK Theatre tour; UAE Tour; European Residencies
3–29 June 2014	Zanna, Don't!	Zanna (Lead)	Landor Theatre, London; Directed by Drew Baker
14–17 July 2014	I Love You, You're Perfect, Now Change!	Man 1	Battersea Barge
2015-2016	The Rocky Horror Show (European Tour)	Brad Majors	European Tour; BB Promotions
2016-2017	Mamma Mia! (UK Tour)	1st Cover Sky/Ensemble	UK Tour; Littlestar & Mamma Mia International
2017–present	Milkshake! (Channel 5)	Children's TV Presenter	UK broadcast on Channel 5, 365 days a year.
