= Emma Hatton =

British actress and singer (born 1983)

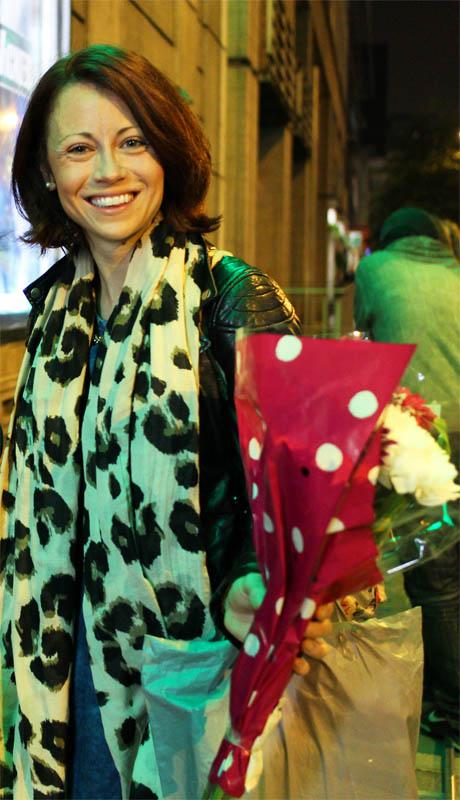
- Born: 6 April 1983 (age 42); Coleford, Gloucestershire, England
- Education: London School of Musical Theatre
- Occupations: Actress, singer
- Years active: West End: 2009 – present

Emma Hatton (born 6 April 1983) is a British actress and singer, who played the role of Elphaba in the West End production of Wicked. She has also understudied the roles of Meat and Scaramouche in We Will Rock You and has a number of other professional stage and theatre credits, such as Donna in Dreamboats and Petticoats. In 2017 she took on the lead role in the Bill Kenwright touring production of Evita. In 2018 she toured as a featured vocalist with the vintage rotating music collective Postmodern Jukebox during their UK and European tour.

== Early life ==
Hatton grew up in Coleford, Gloucestershire, attending St. John's Primary School and Lakers School. She enjoyed performing from an early age, beginning dance lessons at the age of three years, at the Jane Jarrett School of Dancing in Broadwell. Hatton studied for her A levels at Monmouth Sixth Form and her love of theatre grew from playing Sandy in the Lakers School production of Grease and starring in Anything Goes and Daisy Pulls It Off as part of the Forest Theatre Musical Society. She studied English and Sport Science at Loughborough University but enjoyed performing so much, she was inspired to spend a year at London School of Musical Theatre.

As a youngster Hatton was a very talented athlete competing in long and triple jump at county and national level. In 1999 she competed for her home county of Gloucestershire at the English Schools Championships in Bury St Edmunds qualifying for the finals where she finished in 5th place.

== Stage career ==
After graduating from LSMT, Hatton did a variety of theatre work, her big break coming in 2009 when she made her West End debut and originated the role of Donna in Dreamboats and Petticoats. For a while after this she achieved mainly minor theatre roles but hit the West End once more when cast in the ensemble of We Will Rock You in late 2011, also understudying the role of Scarmouche. She chose to stay for a second year and additionally understudied the character Meat, as well as Scaramouche.

After being cast in Wicked, Hatton gave her final performance in We Will Rock You on 5 October 2013 and joined the cast of Wicked on 2 December 2013, becoming standby to the role of Elphaba. Due to a long term back injury sustained by the lead Willemijn Verkaik, Hatton found herself performing the role very frequently, in April 2014 she performed more times than Verkaik. She temporarily became lead Elphaba on 21 July 2014 but played her final performance on 2 August 2014 and returned to being standby when succeeded by original British Elphaba Kerry Ellis. She performed her 100th show in Wicked at the Apollo Victoria Theatre on 3 September 2014.

On 3 October 2014 it was announced that Hatton would take over the role of Elphaba permanently following the departure of American Elphaba Jennifer DiNoia on 31 January 2015. On 17 July 2015, it was announced she had extended her contract as lead Elphaba until at least August 2016.

On 19 May 2016 it was announced that Hatton would play her final performance as Elphaba on 3 September 2016. She was replaced by the long running West End Elphaba Rachel Tucker for the 10th Anniversary of the show.

Other stage credits include Twlya in When Midnight Strikes at the Chelsea Theatre and Finborough Theatre, Fairy Godmother in Cinderella at the Harlequin Theatre, Heaven Sent at the New Wimbledon Theatre, Darling of the Day at the Ondaatje Wing Theatre (part of the National Gallery), Uncle Eric's White Christmas and A Comedy of Eric's at the New Vic and Christmas in New York at the Apollo Theatre.

Recent theatre credits

Start Date	End date	Production	Role(s)	Venue(s)
19 February 2009	18 July 2009	Dreamboats and Petticoats	Donna	Various – UK Tour
22 July 2009	31 October 2009	Dreamboats and Petticoats	Donna	Savoy Theatre
6 January 2010	3 July 2010	Dreamboats and Petticoats	Donna	Playhouse Theatre
22 August 2010	19 September 2010	Darling of the Day	Ensemble / Dance Captain	Ondaatje Wing Theatre
23 March 2011	26 March 2011	Heaven Sent	Vanessa	New Wimbledon Studios
22 August 2011	3 September 2011	A Comedy of Eric's	Lady Montague	New Vic Theatre
10 October 2011	6 October 2012	We Will Rock You	Ensemble, Understudy Scaramouche	Dominion Theatre
8 October 2012	5 October 2013	We Will Rock You	Ensemble, Understudy Meat / Scaramouche	Dominion Theatre
2 December 2013	31 January 2015	Wicked	Standby Elphaba	Apollo Victoria Theatre
2 February 2015	3 September 2016	Wicked	Elphaba	Apollo Victoria Theatre
12 January 2017	23 July 2017	Evita	Eva Perón	Various – UK/German Tour
28 July 2017	13 October 2017	Evita	Eva Perón	Phoenix Theatre
8 June 2023	Present	Tina – The Tina Turner Musical	Rhonda Graam	The Aldwych Theatre

== Charity work ==
Hatton completes a lot of work for charity, and is known for her fundraising for the British Heart Foundation. She has organised and starred in two concerts, both entitled Songbirds in 2013 and 2014, the latter featuring stars such as Sophie Linder-Lee, Jacqueline Hughes and Kerry Enright. She has also presented on the British Heart Foundation radio station.

In 2013 and again in 2014, Hatton ran the London Marathon for the charity, raising £9,266 in 2014, and completing the feat in a time of 5 hours and 39 minutes. She also ran the Royal Parks Foundation Half Marathon on 12 October 2014 to raise money for Moorfields Eye Charity and performed at Elegies for Angels, Punks and Raging Queens, in aid of the MAD Trust on 31 May 2015.

== Awards and nominations ==
In the last two years, Hatton has accrued five award nominations for her West End work.

Year	Nominated work	Award	Awards	Result
2013	Scaramouche / Meat in We Will Rock You	Understudy of the Year	West End Frame Awards	Nominated
2014	Standby Elphaba in Wicked	Understudy of the Year	West End Frame Awards	Nominated
2014	Standby Elphaba in Wicked	Understudy of the Year	BroadwayWorld UK Awards	Nominated
2015	Elphaba in Wicked	Best Performance in a Musical	The Version Music Honours	Nominated
2015	Elphaba in Wicked	Best Performance of a Song	West End Frame Awards	Nominated
