= Nick Slade =

Nick Slade may refer to:

- Nick Slade, character in Silk (TV series)
- Nick Slade, character in Mr. Monk and the Dirty Cop
