= Undercover Coach =

Undercover Coach is a British television short show airing on Disney Channel UK. It follows the paths of five UK sporting stars as they surprise fans and budding athletes on their doorsteps. It premiered on 12 December 2008 as part of the Wizard Blizzard brand. It is shown on weekends.

== Episodes ==
1. George Sampson surprises a viewer and shows off some of his streetdancing moves.
2. The cast of High School Musical UK Tour: Live On Stage surprise a viewer to help improve her singing.
3. Actor Brad Kavanagh surprises a viewer and shares the secret of his success.
4. Pop star Jamelia surprises a viewer and gives the viewer tips on becoming a popstar.
5. Golfer Ian Poulter surprises a viewer and gives the viewer tips on golfing.

There is also an Australian short version of this series that premiered on Disney Channel (Australia) on 5 May 2009. There are 17 episodes.
