= Brad Kavanagh =

British actor

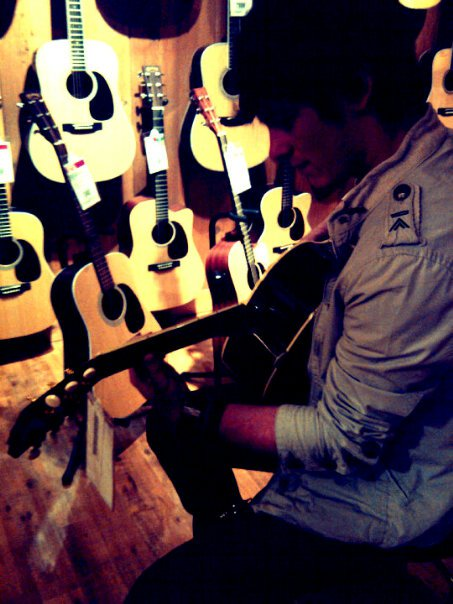
- Kavanagh in 2013
- Born: Whitehaven, Cumbria, England
- Occupations: Actor; musician; director
- Years active: 2003–present
- Musical career
- Instruments: Guitar; Keyboard; Vocals; bass

Brad Kavanagh is an English actor and musician from Whitehaven, Cumbria. He is a guitarist, songwriter, and singer for the English band FLYNT.

Kavanagh was part of the original cast of Billy Elliott: The Musical in the role of Michael. He has also appeared on the Disney Channel and in the Nickelodeon production House of Anubis.

== Stage acting career ==
Brad Kavanagh started acting as a child in a local acting group in Cumbria named Whitehaven Theatre Of Youth. He featured heavily in local amateur productions until his professional stage debut in the West End in Billy Elliot the Musical as Billy's best friend, Michael, at the age of 11. He was a student at St Benedict's Catholic High School in Whitehaven, where he completed his GCSEs and attended 6th Form to complete his A-levels in Product Design, Electronics and I.T.

== Television career ==
In late 2007, Brad Kavanagh joined the cast of Disney Channel's As The Bell Rings. By 2008, he presented the talent competition, My School Musical, also on Disney Channel UK. He also represented The Green team on that Summer's Disney Channel Games.

In 2009, Kavanagh was again on Disney Channel UK presenting Undercover Coach, and featuring in My Camp Rock. He presented the Jonas Brothers 3D Movie Premiere in the UK, which covered the UK premiere of the Jonas Brothers 3D Concert Experience on the morning of the release of the film. He was a judge on Hannah-Oke, an X Factor type game show where contestants and their families sing Hannah Montana songs. He also appeared on Disney Channel USA's Pass The Plate. This would be his last role on the Disney Channel on either side of The Atlantic.

In mid 2010, Brad was cast as the lead male character, Fabian Rutter on the new Nickelodeon TV show House of Anubis. The series premiered on 1 January 2011, and following the huge success of the first season, a second season was ordered, where Kavanagh reprised his role as Fabian Rutter.

Kavanagh continued his work on the show once it was renewed for a third season, which began production in mid-2012 and premiered in January in the US.

On 21 May 2013, Nickelodeon announced a 90-minute special of House of Anubis titled Touchstone of Ra which Kavanagh again reprised his role in.

As of 2020, he is currently inactive in the field of acting.

== Filmography ==
Year	Title	Role	Notes
2007	As the Bell Rings	Dylan	First appeared in second season
2008	My High School Musical	Himself	Co-Presenter along with Samantha Dorrance
2008	Disney Channel Games	Himself	Member of the green team Cyclones
2009	Pass the Plate	Himself	1 episode
2009	My Camp Rock	Himself	Host
2009	Jonas Brothers: Live in London	Himself	
2009	Undercover Coach	Himself	
2009	Hannah-Oke	Himself	Judge
2009	Jonas Brothers 3D Movie Premiere	Himself	
2009	Life Bites	Brad	4 episodes
2011	Dani's House	Marco	1 episode
2011	Anubis Unlocked	Himself	
2011-2013	House of Anubis	Fabian Rutter	Main role
2013	Touchstone of Ra	Fabian Rutter	Main role; TV special
2015	Dani's Castle	Tim	1 episode
2015	Wakfu	Otomai	Special & OVAs, first-ever voice acting role
2015	Dofus: Kerub's Bazaar	Indie	Recurring role
2017	Top Wing	Speedy	Main role

== Music ==
Brad Kavanagh has recorded many songs, some of which can be found on his YouTube channel where he posts covers and original songs. Some songs can be purchased on iTunes, while others can be found on YouTube. The earliest of his songs are: "As the Bell Rings" and "Right Time." Both were shown on a Disney channel at regular intervals throughout the day.

In April 2014, Kavanagh performed in Showcase Live alongside Hollywood Ending. In October 2014, he opened for the band on their UK headliner tour, Punk A$$ Kids tour.

=== Discography ===
Year	Title	Notes
2008	"As the Bell Rings"	Written for the Disney program As the Bell Rings
2008	"Right Time"	Written by Tom Nichols.
2008	"Here I Am"	Cover of a song from the 2008 Disney movie Camp Rock.
2011	"We Shall Overcome"	Featuring Tasie Dhanraj.
2012	"You I See"	Written by Brad for use by his character on the second season of House of Anubis.
2012	"Always the Quiet Ones"	Written by Brad Kavanagh, Rick Parkhouse & George Tizzard.
2012	"Window"	Written by Brad Kavanagh.
2012	"On My Mind"	Written by Brad Kavanagh, Rick Parkhouse & George Tizzard.
2012	"Right There"	Cover of Ariana Grande Original.
2012	"Surrender (Love Is On Our Side)"	A Brad Kavanagh Original.
2012	"Love on Me"	A Brad Kavanagh Original.
2012	"She's Got a Hold On Me"	A Brad Kavanagh Original.
2012	"Risk I Can't Resist"	A Brad Kavanagh Original.

== Awards and nominations ==
Year	Award	Category	Recipient	Result	Ref.
2012	Nickelodeon UK Kids' Choice Awards	Favorite UK Actor	House of Anubis	Nominated	
2013	Nickelodeon UK Kids' Choice Awards	Favorite UK TV Show	House of Anubis	Won	
