= Summer in Transylvania =

British children's television series

- Genre: Sitcom
- Created by: Andy Watts
- Starring: Sophie Stuckey; Amy Wren; Kane Ricca; Charlie Evans; Dan Black; Andrew Harrison
- Composer: Michael J McEvoy
- Country of origin: United Kingdom
- Original language: English
- No. of seasons: 1
- No. of episodes: 20

Production
- Executive producer: Nigel Pickard
- Producer: Candida Julian-Jones
- Running time: 24 minutes
- Production company: The Foundation

Original release
- Network: Nickelodeon UK
- Release: 25 October 2010 – 19 July 2012

Summer in Transylvania is a live action children's television programme that aired on Nickelodeon UK. The programme, originally called Freaky Farleys, was renamed Summer in Transylvania and was filmed in Hendon, London. It is Nickelodeon UK's first original TV series since Genie in the House. It was announced on 23 June 2012 that the programme would not return for a second series.

== Plot ==
Teenager Summer Farley (Sophie Stuckey) moves to Transylvania with her father and brother. She then starts at her new high school, Stoker High, which is filled with zombies, werewolves, vampires, mummies and many other sorts of monsters. She tries to get through school with help from her friends, Heidi the zombie (Amy Wren) and Bobby the werewolf (Kane Ricca).

== Cast ==
=== Humans ===
- Sophie Stuckey as Summer Farley – The main character. Smart, cute and witty, Summer is really nice and one of the two humans attending her school. She has two best friends, Heidi and Bobby; even if Bobby is in love with her, she considers him just a friend. She tries to fit in and goes on many dates.
- Eros Vlahos as Jake Farley – Summer's younger brother.
- Richard Lumsden as Dr Mike Farley – Summer's father.

=== Monsters ===
- Amy Wren as Heidi – Summer's girl best friend, she's a zombie. She's nice but is not afraid to say what she thinks. She wears wacky neon clothes. She has proven to be a good friend, but a bit of a show off like when she tried to take Antonio off of Summer.
- Kane Ricca as Bobby – Sweet, funny, he's a werewolf. He has a huge crush on Summer and is her boy best friend. He doesn't like when Summer dates other guys.
- Dan Black as Rolf – a werewolf, he's Serena's boyfriend. Hot, but unusually quiet, his breath apparently stinks.
- Charlie Evans as Serena – Beautiful, mysterious but very mean, she's a vampire. She makes Summer miserable, however she has been a tad kind to Summer in episode Banned so Summer could help her. She seems to be friendly at times; yet she gets jealous of other girls around Rolf.
- Allan Corduner as Leo - Mike's employer, who is also a brain in a jar.
- Andrew Harrison as Dr Tempest – Principal of Darkness and Head of English, he's a teacher at Stoker High. He's a vampire.
- Lee Simmonds as Bolt – a Frankenstein monster, he's Jake's best friend.
- Phillipa Peak as Magda – Summer and her father Mike Farley's housekeeper, apparently human but there are suggestions there is more to her than meets the eye. She has a crush on Mike Farley.

== Episodes ==
No.	Title	Original release date
1	"The Time That Summer Forgot – Part 1"	25 October 2010
Summer Farley, a human, finds herself moving to Transylvania due to her Dad's New Job. Summer doesn't think anything strange is going on at first until she starts attending 'Stoker High' and realises it is full of creatures like Zombies, Werewolves and Vampires. Summer meets two friends; Heidi (a Zombie) and Bobby (a Werewolf).
2	"The Time That Summer Forgot Part 2"	25 October 2010
As Summer starts settling she finds out about the upcoming Halloween Dance and wants everything to be perfect. When it all goes wrong, she uses a time machine her father created and goes back in time, again and again until she feels everything is perfect. In the process, Summer makes an enemy of a vampire called Serena – the head of the Social Committee. In this episode we find out that Bobbie has started to gain 'feelings' for Summer.
3	"I Was A Teenage Weregirl"	26 October 2010
Summer thinks she's starting to turn into a werewolf after she get hairs on her chest. She starts to believe that she turning into a werewolves because she got rolf's spit all over her(getting werewolf spit on you makes you transform into one). She makes a 'pact' with the werewolves to prove her loyalty to the pack, swearing she would not make fun of the pact or else she will be eaten. When she finds out that the hairs on chest were from Magda's (their house maid) cooking, how will she explain it to the werewolves?
4	"The Date With Two Faces"	27 October 2010
Heidi keeps trying to find Summer a date, much to Bobby's dismay, until Summer finds a guy of her own. But he keeps disappearing before Summer can prove to her friends he exists. When they see him, they see him as his true self. Summer cannot come to terms and she makes his parents end it.
5	"Attack of the Psycho Dates"	28 October 2010
Summer goes out with her friends, but feels sorry for her Dad when she leaves him alone in the house, so she signs him up to a website called 'Love bites back' for single people. Summer goes home to tell her father, but he refuses. Summer persuades him and he finally agrees to go on a date with 'sciencechick'. Summer feels good about helping her dad until she finds out that she set her teacher, Miss Qiberlinking, and her father up together. They go out and her father seems much happier – but Summer decides to try and break them up because its embarrassing for her.
6	"Banned"	5 November 2010
Summer and her friends are at 'The Stakeout', a popular restaurant in Transylvania. But after a blackout, the owner's prized skull is stolen, and blames Rolf and Serena who disappeared during the blackout. This results the owner banning them, but when it turns out they didn't steal the skull its up to Summer, the very one who accused them, to find out who took the skull.
7	"Kiss of the Wolf Boy"	12 November 2010
Summer and Bobby audition for the school play. Summer gets the lead, along with Rolf. When she realises she has to kiss Rolf for 35 pages, she puts a silver ear stud in her mouth, so when Rolf kisses her, he runs away. (Werewolves are allergic to silver.) Because of this, Bobby now gains the lead... Meanwhile, Leo moans that the musicals were better in his days, as at the end of every play, a riot would break out.
8	"Day of the Prickly Waitress"	19 November 2010
It is Summer's birthday but her Dad has to go away so she asks for a birthday party to which her Dad replies yes only if there is a responsible adult present. The only adult around is Magda. When Summer tries to persuade Magda to take a day off she resigns so Summer has to take over Magda's job. Magda in the meantime hafls taken up a job as a waitress at the Stakeout Diner to which people do not like. Summer and her friends have to get Magda back as the house has become messy.
9	"It Lived in a Brain Jar"	26 November 2010
Summer and her friends want to go to the Cemetery Slam concert, and Bobby got tickets. However, her father, Doctor Farley grounds her and says she cannot go to the concert, due to irresponsible behavior. Summer tries everything to persuade him otherwise and then, accidentally, Doctor Farley ends up swapping bodies with Leo, the brain in the jar. Summer uses this to her advantage but then she accidentally ends up swapping bodies with the brain, causing her dad to end up in her body and Leo, still in her dad's. Mahem starts as they try to get back into their own bodies and Summer tries to convince her dad to let her go to the concert.
10	"Invasion of the Boyfriend Snatchers"	3 December 2010
A hot vampire called Antonio, captain of the school's slam-jitsu team catches Summers eye. She, Heidi and Bobby go to join Slam-Jistsu but when Heidi shows how good she is at Slam-Jitsu, Antonio falls for her instead of Summer. Heidi promises that she'll put in a good word for Summer when training with him but instead ends up kissing him. Summer and Bobby see them kissing and Summer and Heidi end up arguing. They challenge each other to a Duel in Slam-Jitsu. Who will win?
11	"I Had an Evil Twin"	4 March 2011
Summer invents a twin sister called Cleo and digs a hole of lies when she accidentally goes on the wrong blind date which Magda set up for her.
12	"The Mummy's Curse"	11 March 2011
After Summer accidentally sells Heidi's friendship bracelet online to Serena, She has to get it back whilst fighting the curse of the mummy and without Heidi finding out.
13	"The Bug"	18 March 2011
Magda's nephew comes to stay after she tells lies to her family, including that she's married to Summer's Dad. Summer now has to fight for Magda's secret anyway possible!
14	"Beware The Triangle"	9 July 2012
Is Bobby dating Summer behind Heidi's back? Is he dating Heidi behind Summer's back? Is he dating them both behind each other's backs? Serena enjoys sowing the seeds of doubt.
15	"Dance of the Vampires"	10 July 2012
Serena is always in charge of organising the Fang Fest Fling Ball every year. Summer is outraged that it's for couples only and challenges Serena to a school vote to change things.
16	"The Vanishing Brain"	12 July 2012
Leo has gone missing, and Summer and Rolf find themselves handcuffed together, Heidi and Bobby dressed as chicken and egg but they do not remember anything! Now they all must uncover the truth before Serena's birthday and Summer's dad coming home?
17	"Double Date of Doom"	16 July 2012
Who is taking who to the fundraiser at the Stakeout? Do Heidi and Summer want to ask the same boy, or has Bobby got his fur crossed? The prize is a moonlit boat-ride for two.
18	"Night of the Missing Goat Knuckles"	17 July 2012
Summer is having a New Year's Eve Party. Some Transylvanian traditions are strange, including, erm.. goat knuckles. No party is complete without them apparently.
19	"Dawn of the Matchmaker"	18 July 2012
Summer tries to hook Bobby up with a girlfriend, but when Olga starts collecting Bobby's hair is she more than a nutcase?
20	"I Dated A Teenage Vampire"	19 July 2012
Max is a bad, bad boy and very annoying. Cute, but annoying! Can Summer fix him, or is it true that a leopard never changes his spots – or a vampire his teeth?
