= The Nine Lives of Tomas Katz =

2000 film by Ben Hopkins

- German poster
- Directed by: Ben Hopkins
- Written by: Ben Hopkins; Tom Fisher
- Produced by: Caroline Hewitt
- Starring: Tom Fisher; Ian McNeice
- Cinematography: Julian Court
- Music by: Dominik Scherrer
- Distributed by: E.D. Distribution
- Release date: 20 July 2001
- Running time: 87 minutes
- Country: United Kingdom
- Language: English

The Nine Lives of Tomas Katz is a 2000 Anglo-German black and white surreal comedy. It has been described as an "avant-garde comedy about the Apocalypse", co-written and directed by Ben Hopkins.

== Premise ==
On the last day of creation, a stranger arrives in London. No one knows who he is or where he has come from but by the time he leaves, the entire universe will have been erased.

== Cast ==
- Tom Fisher as No / Tomas Katz
- Ian McNeice as Inspector
- Tony Maudsley as Taxi Driver
- Sachiko Hidari as Cuthbert Will Keen
- Andrew Melville as Minister of Fish
- Toby Jones as Civil Servant
- Asif Kapadia as Gwupigrubynudnylandian
- Kris Krishnamma as Gwupigrubynudnylandian
- Jamille Jinnah as Gwupigrubynudnylandian
- Sophie Bevan as Journalist
- Trevor Thomas as Schlauch
- Amelia Curtis as Underworld Announcer
- Tilly Blackwood as Underworld Secretary
- David de Keyser as Exhumed Rabbi
- John Ramm as Ivul Gurk
- Janet Henfrey as Janice Waily
- Boyd Clack as Abel Mularchy
- Tara Savage as Radiator Child
- Callum Savage as Radiator Child
- Oliver Parkes as Drumchild
- Andrew Kötting as Taxi Driver
- Graham Lawson as axi Driver
- Joseph Greig as Astral Guide
- Tim Barlow as Mr. Browne
- Joan Oliver as Care Worker
- Colin Weatherall as Bank Clerk
- Sean Albuquerque as Geoff Plow
- Jason Thorpe as Officer Willis
- Togo Igawa as Japanese Scuba Diver
- Kiki Kendrick as Suburban Mum
- Stephen Pye as Suburban Son
- Yvette Richardson as Police Secretary
- Francesca Dowd as Tea Lady
- Sadie Walters as Tea Lady
- Thomas Q. Napper as Man Falling During 'Gripped'
- Paul Ritter as Dave
- Steven O'Donnell as Keith
- Noah Taylor as Hyde Park Nutter
- David Farr as Hyde Park Nutter
- Kim Noble as Hyde Park Nutter
- Tim Potter ad Apocalyptic Nutter
- Andrew Harrison as Voice
- India Martin as Voice
- Josh De La Mare as Voice
- Luke Morris as Voice
- Catherine Gosling Fuller as Voice
- Andy Lane as Voice

== Critical response ==
Peter Bradshaw wrote in The Guardian, "a distinctively English, rather than simply British, movie in its loopy, diverting surrealism...Nothing so obvious as a plot is allowed to cramp this movie's style as it swoops weirdly across the dream landscape of London like a demented, dishevelled bird." George Perry wrote on BBC Films, "this has to be one of the strangest films of the year, a weird apocalyptic vision shot in the most mundane of London surroundings, with all too obvious budgetary constraints pushed asunder by the sheer energy of the director's imagination."

== Awards ==
The film was the winner of the Evening Standard Best Newcomer Award 2000, for director Ben Hopkins.
