= Andrew Harrison (actor) =

English actor

- Born: Andrew Stuart Harrison; 7 February 1957 (age 69); Edmonton, London, England
- Occupation: Actor
- Years active: 1984–present

Andrew Stuart Harrison (born 7 February 1957 in Edmonton, London) is an English actor.

== Career ==
Andrew Harrison began his career in repertory theatre playing the lead roles in A Chorus of Disapproval and Serious Money at the Northcott Theatre, Exeter. His West End (London) debut came with a role in Sir Michael Hordern's Trelawny of the 'Wells'.

Andrew has numerous TV credits include The Bill, Miss Marple, and Birds of a Feather, and the films A Sea Change and An Ideal Husband. He contributes regularly to BBC Radio. In television, Andrew is perhaps best known for his roles in Beyond Narnia and Florence Nightingale.

== Filmography ==
- 2011 King James' Bible as Bishop Lancelot Andrews
- 2010 Derelict as Governor Phillips
- 2010 Summer in Transylvania Dr. Tempest
- 2009 Dorian Gray as House Seller
- 2008 Home as Dad
- 2005 Florence Nightingale as Lord Palmerston
- 2005 C.S. Lewis: Beyond Narnia as Albert Lewis, The Father
- 2005 Pepys as Clerk of the Court
- 2000 The Nine Lives of Tomas Katz as Voice
- 1999 An Ideal Husband as Algy
