= Dreamboats and Petticoats =

2009 British jukebox musical

- The album cover of the original London cast recording of Dreamboats and Petticoats.
- Music: Various Artists
- Lyrics: Various Artists
- Book: Laurence Marks; Maurice Gran
- Basis: The compilation album series Dreamboats and Petticoats
- Productions: 2009 UK tour; 2009 West End (First run); 2010 West End (Second run); 2010 UK tour; 2012 West End (Third run); 2017 UK Tour

Dreamboats and Petticoats is a jukebox musical based on popular songs from the fifties and early sixties. The musical, featuring those songs of the rock 'n' roll era, is set around the years 1957 to 1963 and was written by Laurence Marks and Maurice Gran.

It was first performed at The Churchill Theatre in Bromley, England, in February 2009, followed by a UK tour. This run received rave critical reviews and widespread audience acclaim. It subsequently moved to the Savoy Theatre in London's West End from July to September in 2009 and then returned to London in a new location at the Playhouse Theatre, where it ran until 4 August 2012 before transferring to the Wyndham's Theatre. Alongside the West End runs, the show toured the UK extensively, between 2009 and 2014. The current tour is a sequel, entitled Dreamboats and Miniskirts.

== Synopsis ==
It's 1961, where Bobby, an awkward but talented teenager, is auditioning for a band at the local Youth Club. He almost gets the part, but is edged out by a last minute arrival to the auditions: the cool and confident Norman. The teenagers that hang out at Youth Club all know each other, even if they're not necessarily friends. These teens include Bobby and his best friend Ray, Ray's younger sister Laura who has a crush on Bobby, cool girl Sue whom Bobby has a crush on, and Donna, who is Sue's friend.

Bobby's father announces that the Youth Club association is holding the first National song writing competition. Bobby and Laura, who have similar tastes in music, agree to write a song together. At first they make some progress, with Bobby coming up with an idea and basic tune, which Laura takes on to expand into a full song. But Bobby then starts ignoring Laura when Sue, the girl he has a crush on, starts flirting with him. Laura warns Bobby that Sue is only pretending to be into him in order to make Norman jealous, but Bobby doesn't care.

The Youth Club are taken on a road trip to a local carnival, and their emotions run high. Ray and Donna get together and become a couple. Sue's plan to make Norman jealous works, and Norman takes her away to be alone. Bobby is crushed, and Laura tells him "I told you so". However, when the whole group gathers together at the end of night, Norman boasts to the others that he went "all the way" with Sue. Sue is enraged and humiliated, insisting that they only kissed. Bobby confronts Norman, insisting that he apologize to Sue. At first Norman refuses, so Bobby challenges Norman to an "official" fight in a ring, in which Bobby wins. Norman apologizes to Sue, and Sue is ecstatically grateful to Bobby and happily becomes his girl.

Laura tries to remind Bobby about their songwriting commitment but to no avail, since all his time is dedicated to Sue. Norman is also being ignored by Sue, even after apologizing and promising to become better. Norman then approaches Laura, both flirting with her with suggestions that what he really needs is a "good" girl, and that they should write a song together. Bobby is confused and upset when he hears about this from Ray, who also tells Bobby that Laura has had feelings for him for a long time. Bobby and Sue break up when Bobby accidentally causes Sue to fall out his bedroom window, but when he approaches Laura to reconcile, she claims that he only started to notice her because she's started dressing nicer and doing her hair.

Laura's 16th birthday party is held at the Youth Club. She and Sue decide to put the awkwardness between them to the past, and agree to be friends. Norman and Sue reconcile. Bobby and Laura confess their feelings in the locker room, admitting that they've each liked the other for a long time and didn't know what to do about it, and finally kiss.

News comes in from the songwriting competition. Bobby and Laura, who are a team again, have made it to the next round. Norman did not make the cut at all. It then jumps to the final National performance, where Bobby and Laura win with the results of the joint efforts, the pop song "Dreamboats and Petticoats".

== Development ==
After spending several weeks at the number one spot in the UK Compilation Charts and with over two million copies sold of the first album, the unexpected success of Dreamboats and Petticoats CD series made producers of the series to consider a stage musical adaptation. Brian Berg, the managing director of Universal Music TV (UMTV) and director of Universal Music UK, reportedly saw a niche in the market for older audiences who preferred the music of their teenage years in comparison to the seemingly inaccessible youth-driven playlists on current radio stations. Berg saw the adaptation of a stage musical as a move that "would enhance the brand" and therefore got in touch with Bill Kenwright, producer Laurie Mansfield, director Bob Tomson, musical director Keith Strachan, choreographer Carole Todd and writers Laurence Marks and Maurice Gran to pen the book of the show. He had "the basic idea of youth clubs and nostalgia and a songwriting competition" as the basis of the show because he was a teenager in the sixties who attended a local youth club in Finsbury Park, north London. He added, "As kids growing up in the Sixties we all played in bands, I was a drummer in The Sound Barrier, the greatest unsigned band of the Sixties."

== Productions ==
=== London (2009–2013) ===
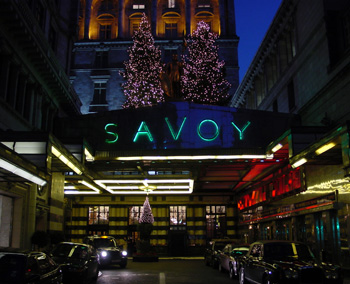
The Savoy Theatre where the musical was first performed in London.

Dreamboats and Petticoats was first performed in London at the Savoy Theatre on 22 July 2009. The run terminated on 31 October 2009 to make way for Legally Blonde.

Role	Original	2010–11	2011–12	2012–13	2016–17
Bobby	Scott Bruton	Alexis Gerred	Scott Bruton	David Ribi	Ali Higgins
Laura	Daisy Wood-Davis	Lorna Want/Megan Jones	Charlotte Jeffery	Samantha Dorrance	Elizabeth Carter
Norman	Ben Freeman	Bradley Clarkson	Harry Neale	Sam Attwater	Alastair Hill
Sue	Jennifer Biddle	Emma Stephens	Susannah Allman	Susannah Allman	Laura Darton
Ray	A.J Dean	A.J Dean	David Gale	Rob Eyles	David Luke Wilson
Donna	Emma Hatton	Jess Ellerby	Gemma Salter	Hannah Wood	Gracie Johnson
Older Bobby/Phil	David Cardy	Jimmy Johnston	Des O'Connor	David Cardy	Jimmy Johnson
Jeremy	Andrew Venning	ROLE CUT	Robbie Durham	Robbie Durham	Rob Gathercole
Daisy	Sophie Byrne	Bethany Compson-Bradford	Francesca Loren	Claire McGarahan	Chloe Louisa Jane
Barry	Robin Johnson	Kris Hudson	Kris Hudson	Kris Hudson	Billy Stookes
Colin/Musical Director	Michael Kantola	Michael Kantola	Michael Kantola	Michael Kantola	Henry McCooke
Andy	Adam Welsh	Tim Jackson	Joey Hickman	Sheridan Lloyd	Sheridan Lloyd
Richard	Sam Palladio	David Ephgrave / Michael Paver	Richie Hart	Matthew Quinn	Jay Osborne
Eric	Stuart Ward	Alan Howell	Alan Howell	Alan Howell	Alan Howell
Frank/Slugger/Compare	Mike Lloyd	Mike Lloyd	Mike Lloyd	Mike Lloyd	Mike Lloyd
Babs	Wendy Paver	Jessica Dyas	Jessica Dyas	Emily O'keeffe	Lauren Chinnery
Derek	Patrick Burbridge	Patrick Burbridge	Patrick Burbridge	ROLE CUT	Josh Tye
Helen	Deborah Hewitt		CUT		

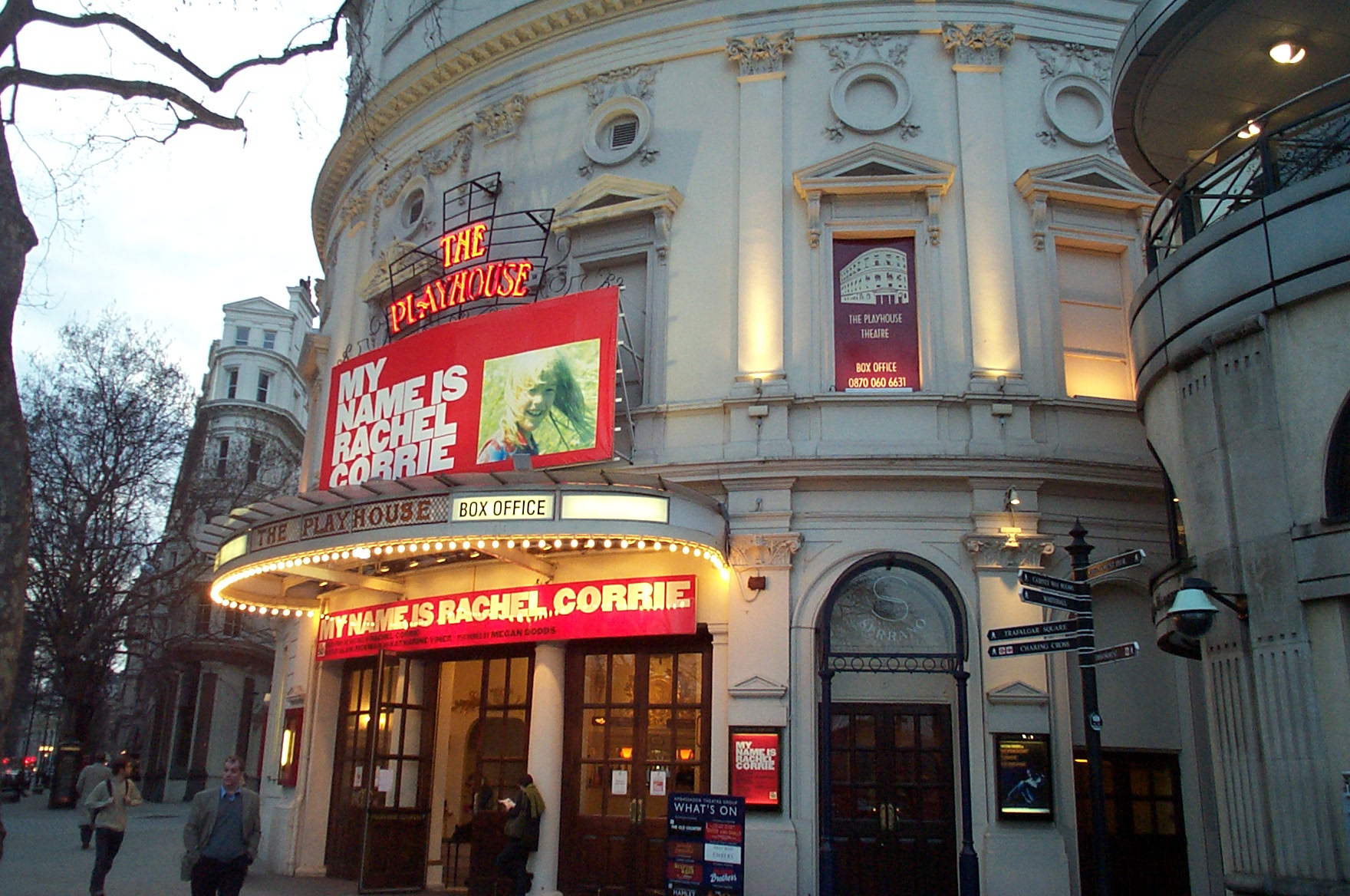
The musical transferred to the Playhouse Theatre in January 2010.

After a three-month hiatus, the musical found a new location at the Playhouse Theatre on 6 January 2010. It closed on 4 August 2012. The 3rd and final London venue for the musical was the Wyndham's Theatre, where it had a limited run, 16 October 2012 to 19 January 2013.

=== First UK tour (2009) ===
Opening on 19 February 2009 at The Churchill Theatre in Bromley, Dreamboats and Petticoats had a successful run in theatres across the UK for five months. This tour finished on 18 July 2009 at the Sunderland Empire in Sunderland. Upon finishing, the production, due to heavy demand and unexpected success, moved to the West End for a three-month run. This production, therefore, had the same cast as the original London cast.

=== Second UK tour (2010) ===
Again starting at the Churchill Theatre in Bromley, Dreamboats and Petticoats enjoyed another tour of the UK. This time with an alternative cast to the first time. The tour started on 19 January 2010 and played its last performance on 4 December 2010 in Grimsby.

The cast were:

Role	Jan–Jul	Aug–Dec
Bobby	Josh Capper	Josh Capper
Laura	Daniella Bowen	Daniella Bowen
Norman	Jonathan Bremner	Jonathan Bremner
Sue	Carolynne Good	Francesca Jackson
Ray	Gareth Leighton	Wayne Smith
Donna	Clare Ivory	Emily Goodenough
Older Bobby/Phil	Anthony Clegg	Oliver Beamish
Derek	Ben Tolley	Tristan Pate
Daisy	Bethany Compson-Bradford	Claire McGarahan
Barry	Daniel Graham	Charlie Wade
Colin	Chris Coxon	Chris Coxon
Andy	Tim Jackson	Greg Last
Richard	Alan Howell	Alan Howell
Eric	Glen Joseph	Glen Joseph
Frank/Slugger/Compare	Simon Nock	Jem Dobbs
Babs	Lauren Storer	Jessica Dyas
Jeremy	Michael Paver	Michael Paver
Swing	Katie Pritchard	Lauren Morgan

=== Third UK tour (2011) ===
A third tour started in June 2011, opening at the Theatre Royal, Windsor.

The cast were:

Role	June – December	January – May 2012	June – December 2012
Bobby	David Ribi	David Ribi	Alexis Gerred/Scott Haining
Laura	Samantha Dorrance	Samantha Dorrance	Liz Carter
Norman	Ben James Ellis	Ben James Ellis	Ben James Ellis
Sue	Katie Birtill	Robyn Mellor	Amy Diamond
Ray	Josh Little	Dan O'Brien	Dan O'Brien
Donna	Anna Campkin	Anna Campkin	Anna Campkin
Older Bobby/Phil	Graeme Henderson	Terry Winstanley	Terry Winstanley
Jeremy	Robbie Durham	Josef Pitura-Riley	Josef Pitura-Riley
Daisy	Francesca Loren	Tara Nelson	Rachel Nottingham
Barry	Christopher Wheeler	Christopher Wheeler	Christopher Wheeler
Richard	Matthew Quinn	Matthew Quinn	Joey Ellis
Colin	Chris Coxon	Will Tierney	Will Tierney
Andy	Adam Day Howard	Pat Burbridge	Pat Burbridge
Eric	James Nitti	James Nitti	James Nitti
Babs	Emily O'Keeffe	Emma Jane Morton	Emma Jane Morton
Derek	Tristan Pate	Mike Slader	Mike Slader
Frank/Slugger/Compare	Chris Fry	Gavin Barnes	Gavin Barnes
Swing	Lauren Morgan	Rachel Nottingham	Chloe Edwards-Wood

=== 2017 UK Tour ===
Again starting at the Theatre Royal, Windsor, Dreamboats and Petticoats enjoyed another tour of the UK. The tour started in January 2017 and played its last performance in Brighton in October.

The cast were:

Role	Actor Musician
Bobby	Alistair Higgins
Laura	Elizabeth Carter
Norman	Alastair Hill
Sue	Laura Darton
Ray	David Luke
Donna	Gracie Johnson
Older Bobby/Phil	Jimmy Johnston
Derek	Josh Tye
Daisy	Chloe Edwards-Wood
Barry	Billy Stookes
Colin	Henry Alexander
Andy	Sheridan Lloyd
Richard	Jay Osborne
Eric	Alan Howell
Frank/Slugger/Compare	Mike Lloyd
Babs	Lauren Chinnery
Jeremy	Rob Gathercole
Swing	Stephanie Hackett

=== Future productions ===
Brian Berg, the executive producer for Universal records stated that there are plans for productions in the US and Australia and the possibility of a feature film in 2012. To date, there are no international productions or film productions.

== Spin-offs and sequels ==
Bill Kenwright, the original producer, has also produced Save the Last Dance for Me and Dreamboats And Miniskirts. Save the Last Dance for Me is a spin-off production which employed a lot of the same creative team and cast, but did not continue the story from Dreamboats and Petticoats. It primarily utilised the songs of Doc Pomus and Mort Shuman. Dreamboats and Miniskirts is a sequel that continues the story of Bobby and Laura. Set in 1963 it tells how the band deals with the start of the British Invasion.

A third instalment of the Dreamboats and Petticoats franchise, Dreamboats and Petticoats – The Christmas Party, opened at the Broadway Theatre, Peterborough at the end of 2015.

== Music ==
=== Musical numbers ===
Act I

1. Overture – Band (The Conquests)
2. Let's Dance – Bobby
3. The Wanderer – Norman
4. Jezebel – Donna
5. To Know Him Is to Love Him – Laura
6. Good Timin' – Norman
7. You Won't Catch Me Crying – Bobby
8. Dream Baby Dream – Laura
9. You Won't Catch Me Crying (reprise) – Laura
10. Wonderful Land – Band (The Conquests)
11. Shakin' All Over – Sue & Norman
12. In Dreams – Bobby
13. In Dreams (reprise) – Bobby
14. Bobby's Girl – Ray & Donna
15. Palisades Park – The Company
16. Little Town Flirt – Phil & Ray
17. Sweet Nothin's – Sue & Donna
18. Runaway / Who's Sorry Now? – Bobby & Laura
19. Poetry in Motion – Ray
20. It's Only Make Believe – Laura
21. Do You Wanna Dance? – The Company

Act II

1. Entr'acte – Band (The Conquests)
2. Dream Lover – Older Bobby & Bobby
3. Great Pretender – Norman
4. Only the Lonely – Bobby
5. Donna – Ray
6. Teenager in Love – Laura
7. Runaround Sue – Bobby, Ray & Band (The Conquests)
8. Shop Around – Phil
9. Dreamboats and Petticoats (short) – Bobby
10. Only Sixteen – Bobby
11. Da Do Ron Ron – Donna, Sue, & The Company
12. Happy Birthday Sweet Sixteen – The Company
13. Wonderful World – Laura & Bobby
14. Quarter to Three – Ray
15. You Don't Know – Sue
16. Let It Be Me – Bobby & Laura
17. Where the Angels Go – The Carnegie Sisters
18. Dreamboats and Petticoats – Bobby & Laura
19. Let's Twist Again – Norman
20. C'mon Everybody – Ray
21. At the Hop – The Company

== Recordings ==
A live cast recording of the original London cast was released on 1 December 2009. It was recorded live, in front of audiences, at the Savoy Theatre.

== Awards and nominations ==
=== Original London production ===
Year	Award	Category	Nominee	Result
2010	Laurence Olivier Award	Best New Musical		Nominated
