= Love Me Love Me (film) =

2026 romantic drama film

- Release poster
- Directed by: Roger Kumble
- Written by: Veronica Galli; Serena Tateo
- Based on: Love Me Love Me by Stefania S.
- Produced by: Rafaella Leone; Luca Mezzaroma
- Starring: Mia Jenkins; Pepe Barroso Silva; Luca Melucci
- Cinematography: Martina Cocco
- Edited by: Silvia De Rose
- Music by: Ginevra Nervi
- Production companies: Amazon MGM Studios; Leone Film Group; Lotus Production; Wattpad Webtoon Studios
- Distributed by: Amazon MGM Studios (via Prime Video)
- Release date: February 13, 2026
- Running time: 99 minutes
- Country: Italy
- Language: English

Love Me Love Me is a 2026 Italian English-language romantic drama film based on the book of the same name written by Stefania S. Directed by Roger Kumble, written by Veronica Galli and Serena Tateo and produced by Rafaella Leone and Luca Mezzaroma, it stars Mia Jenkins, Pepe Barroso Silva and Luca Melocci.

It was released on Amazon Prime Video on February 13, 2026.

== Plot ==
June White has just moved to Milan from London with her mother following the death of her older brother, August. She begins attending Saint Mary’s International School, where Amelia and Blaze quickly befriend her. They warn her about charming but troubled student James Hunter.

During a humanities class, June meets Will. At the same time, she has her first run-ins with James, inadvertently taking his seat and later spilling coffee on him. He takes her to the boys' locker room, where he changes his clothes and hands her the soiled garments to wash and iron.

That same evening, Amelia and Blaze get June ready, then take her to an underground club featuring dancing, drinking, and MMA matches. James himself fights in the ring and wins. His best friend Will confides in him that he likes June. Will dances with her later that night, but James intervenes, pulling her away and forcing her to leave the club. Shortly after, Will texts her to find out what happened, but June lies.

The next day Will meets up with June and they share a kiss before she hurries to babysit the son of her mother’s boss. Unbeknownst to her, the boy is James’s younger brother Jasper. James has an unexpected encounter with June in the shower.

That evening they all attend a party, where Will shows signs of jealousy. Backstage, June is harassed by James’s challenger Pietro. Will tries to defend her but gets hit. James steps in to save them, though the match is cancelled.

Later, Will and June attempt to drive a drunken James home in a borrowed van. When left alone, James taunts June, trying to get his flask back. Tension arises between them but Will’s sudden return interrupts the moment and leads to an argument with June.

Shortly after, she and Will kiss, leading to an intimate moment in the van while James pretends to sleep in the back seat. June realizes he is awake but continues anyway, though the encounter ends quickly. Later, James messages her, sending photos, and engages her in a interaction that leads her to orgasm while he talks to her.

At school, James taunts June, insinuating that she has feelings for him. He then reveals he was testing her to see if she was worthy of Will—and that she failed it.

During another clandestine meeting, James wins a match but vomits directly afterwards, as his coach Austin injected him with performance-enhancing drugs. Meanwhile, at a party, Will receives an anonymous photo of June and James together, accompanied by a message warning against trusting them. Distraught, he mixes pills with vodka, becoming sick; June and James are alerted just in time.

June returns home on James’s motorcycle. There, she encounters Austin, who threatens her before leaving. James arrives shortly after and tells her about the trauma Will suffered after his relationship with his ex Ari ended. In turn, June shares that her brother August died two years earlier in a motorcycle accident linked to the use of steroids and other substances. Later that night, she dreams of kissing him and making love to him. The next day, James confronts Austin, accusing him of threatening June and cutting ties with him, refusing any further substances. However, at school, he acts distantly toward her.

At Amelia’s masquerade birthday party, Will receives a video showing James outside June’s house. The footage circulates among the students. Humiliated, June flees, with James following her. At her home, he comforts her, and they fall asleep in each other's arms.

The next morning, June's mother and James's father find them together and react angrily. Meanwhile, Blaze discovers the truth: Amelia is responsible for circulating the photos and videos that hurt June.

During a new MMA match, Will faces off against James. Austin has administered steroids to his friend as well, to ensure a victory. June triggers the fire alarm to stop the fight. Amidst the chaos, Austin kidnaps James and flees.

June chases them on motorcycle. An accident ensues: the car catches fire and James is trapped, while the former manager escapes. Will arrives and helps June rescue him, pulling him out of the burning vehicle.

== Cast ==
- Mia Jenkins as June
- Pepe Barroso Silva as James
- Luca Melucci as Will
- Andrea Guo as Amelia
- Michelangelo Vizzini as Blaze
- Madior Fall as Jackson
- Vanessa Donghi as Ari
- Elizabeth Kinnear as April
- Tommaso Caporali as Austin

== Production ==
On March 26, 2025 Prime Video announced the film in Series Mania. On December 5, 2025 the platform announced the main cast.

== Release ==
Love Me Love Me was released worldwide on February 13, 2026 through Amazon Prime Video.

== Sequel ==
On March 6, 2026 Prime Video announced the greenlighting of a sequel based on the second book of the Love Me Love Me series. It is scheduled to be released in 2027. On October 9, 2026, it was announced a third film based on the third novel in the series is in development.
