= Samantha Dorrance =

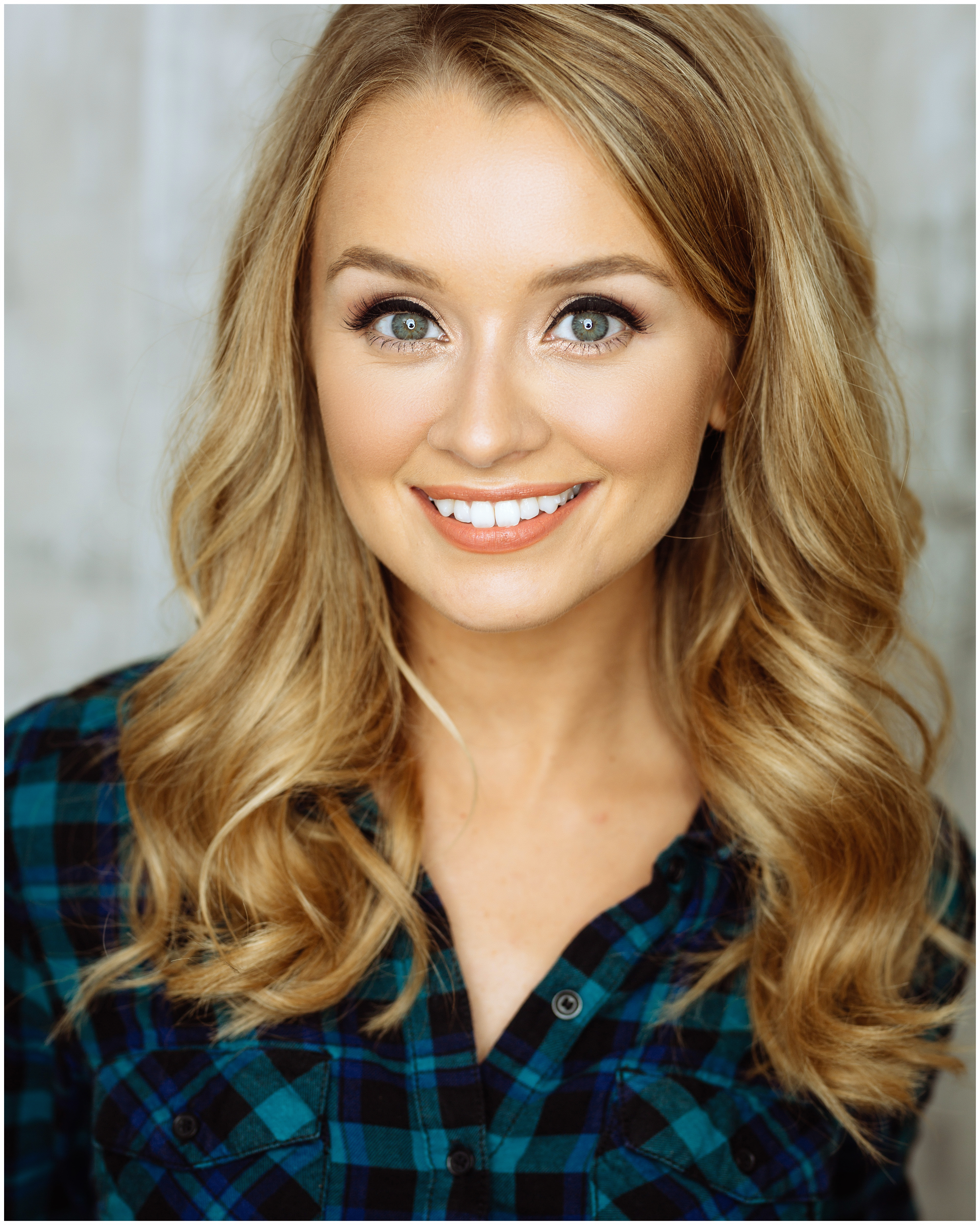
- Dorrance in 2018

Background information
- Born: 18 May 1992 (age 34); Willenhall, West Midlands
- Genres: Pop
- Occupations: Actress, singer, dancer
- Years active: 2006–present
- Website: samanthadorrance.com

Samantha Dorrance is a British actress, singer-songwriter, TV presenter and writer who reached fame on Disney Channel UK. Best known for playing Mr Tumble's best friend Tootsie on CBeebies and for her role of Laura in Dreamboats and Petticoats London's West End.

== Biography ==
=== Career ===
Samantha won Disney Channel's "You're the Star" talent competition in 2007 which led to the release of her debut single "Music in Me". She went on to host her own talent show on the channel "My School Musical" alongside her co-presenter Brad Kavanagh. She then joined the Disney Movie Surfer's team, flying to movie sets worldwide to take Disney viewers backstage of the latest Disney Movies.

At 19, Samantha landed her first West End lead as Laura in Dreamboats and Petticoats for Bill Kenwright. She had a successful 2 year run at both The Playhouse and The Wyndham's.

Samantha went back to Disney for a while to present 2 more shows. "The Disney Channel Dance Along" and Disney's "You Can Do It". She has also presented for the likes of SKY VIP and LEGO.

She is known for starring in both UK and International theatre tours playing role's such as Gertrude McFuzz in Seussical the Musical and Skye in Nickelodeon Arena Tour of Paw Patrol. She is also knows for her guest appearances in shows such as BBC Doctors.

One of her most loved role's has been starring alongside Justin Fletcher as Mr Tumble's silly best friend, Tootsie in The Tale of Mr Tumble. A CBeebies feature length in partnership with MIF (Manchester International Festival)

Samantha is also creative behind the camera. She wrote and produced her own children's stage show "Sammy & The Sparks" which she successfully toured around the UK in 2023. Because of her writing, filming, editing and animation skills, Samantha was given the role of Creative Director at production house, ELT throughout lockdown. When she began, they were making educational content for schools worldwide, teaching children English grammar through song. By the time she left, they were also creating and airing their own TV show in Japan. Samantha also wrote 10 songs for the show and over 30 episodes, working closely with Oxford University.

She has performed in over 20 pantomimes, her favourite according to social media has been playing Goldilocks in Goldilocks and The Three Bears at Birmingham Hippodrome. Directed by Michael Harrison for Crossroads Live.

== Personal life ==
She is currently in a relationship with her on-screen co-star Justin Fletcher. Dorrance played the part of Tootsie against Justin in The Tale of Mr Tumble on CBeebies in 2015.

== Discography ==
Studio singles/albums

- "City Life" (2012)
- Going My Way (2015)
- "Love Me Like You Do" (2015)
- "Holding You" ft. Joe Sterling (2016)
- Original Cast Recording of 1066 The Musical (2021)

== Credits ==
- 2007 – You're the Star Competition on Disney Channel UK, winner.
- 2008 – My School Musical on Disney Channel UK, presenter.
- 2008 – High School Musical 3 Movie Surfers, Disney Channel US, presenter.
- 2009 – Peter Pan, Spillers, Wendy.
- 2010 – Cinderella, Spillers, Cinderella.
- 2011 – Death of a Nightingale, Tracey.
- 2011 – Dreamboats & Petticoats 2011 Tour, Laura.
- 2011 – Cinderella, Spillers, Cinderella.
- 2012 – Dreamboats & Petticoats 2012 Tour, Laura.
- 2012 – Dreamboats & Petticoats (West End), Laura.
- 2013 – Doctors, BBC1, Zoe.
- 2013 – Snow White, Shone Productions, Snow White.
- 2014 – Disney Dance Along, Disney Channel, Presenter.
- 2014 – Dance With Disney Junior, Disney Juniors, Presenter.
- 2015 – The Tale of Mr Tumble, MIF BBC CBeebies, Tootsie.
- 2015 – Seussical International Tour, Sell A Door, Gertrude McFuzz.
- 2015 – Aladdin, Enchanted Entertainments, Princess Jasmine.
- 2016 – Peter Pan, Evolution, Wendy – Octagon Theatre, Yeovil.
- 2017 – Paw Patrol LIVE, Nickelodeon/Lifelike Touring, Skye.
- 2017 – Peter Pan, Evolution, Wendy – Marlowe Theatre, Canterbury.
- 2018 – Doctors, BBC1, Vicky Coake.
- 2018 – Justin's Band Tour, Herself.
- 2018 – Lake Erie, October Films, Debbie.
- 2018 – Explain With Lego, Lego, Presenter.
- 2019–2020 – Peter Pan, Evolution, Wendy.
- 2020 – Creative Director at ELT.
- 2021 – SKY VIP, SKY, Presenter.
- 2021–2022 – Goldilocks & The Three Bears at Birmingham Hippodrome, Crossroads LIVE, Goldilocks.
- 2022 – Sammy & The Sparks LIVE, debut show, Writer/Producer
- 2022 – SKY VIP, SKY, Presenter.
- 2022–2023 – Beauty & The Beast, Evolution, Beauty.
- 2023 – Sammy & The Sparks LIVE, UK Tour, Writer/Producer.
- 2023–2024 – Snow White, Imagine Theatre, Snow White.
