= Viewpoint (British TV series) =

- Created by: Harry Bradbeer; Ed Whitmore
- Written by: Ed Whitmore
- Directed by: Ashley Way
- Starring: Noel Clarke; Alexandra Roach
- Composer: Jack Halama
- Country of origin: United Kingdom
- No. of series: 1
- No. of episodes: 5

Production
- Executive producers: Lucy Bedford; Harry Bradbeer; Noel Clarke; Ashley Way; Ed Whitmore
- Producer: Clare Shepherd
- Production company: Tiger Aspect Productions Unstoppable

Original release
- Network: ITV
- Release: 26 April – 30 April 2021

Viewpoint is a British police procedural drama thriller television miniseries created by Harry Bradbeer and Ed Whitmore and starring Noel Clarke and Alexandra Roach. Produced by Tiger Aspect Productions and directed by Ashley Way, it aired on ITV nightly from 26 April 2021, with the final episode premiering exclusively on ITV Hub and STV Player.

== Premise ==
Viewpoint follows a tense police surveillance investigation into a tight-knit Manchester community and explores whether it is ever possible to observe the lives of others with true objectivity and zero effect. Surveillance detective DC Martin Young (Noel Clarke) sets up his observation post in the home of single mum and secret voyeur Zoe Sterling (Alexandra Roach). Zoe’s windows command a panoramic view of Westbury Square, and more importantly provide a direct sightline into the home of missing primary-school teacher Gemma Hillman (Amy Wren) and her boyfriend – and prime suspect in her disappearance – Greg Sullivan (Fehinti Balogun).

== Cast ==
- Noel Clarke as DC Martin Young, a surveillance detective
- Alexandra Roach as Zoe Sterling, a single mother
- Amy Wren as Gemma Hillman, a missing primary school teacher
- Fehinti Balogun as Greg Sullivan, Gemma's boyfriend
- Bronagh Waugh as DC Stella Beckett
- Marcus Garvey as DC Roly Dalton
- Phil Davis as DI Liam Cox
- Sarah Niles as DCI Jill Conroy
- Shannon Murray as Hayley Jones
- Ian Puleston-Davies as Donald Vernon
- Catherine Tyldesley as Kate Tuckman
- Dominic Allburn as Carl Tuckman
- Lucy Chambers as Chloe Tuckman
- Carlyss Peer as Sarah Young
- Erin Shanagher as Fiona Baker
- Sia Kiwa as Melissa
- Kíla Lord Cassidy as Caitlin Sterling

== Episodes ==
| No. | Title | Directed by | Written by | Original release date | UK viewers (millions) |
|---|---|---|---|---|---|
| 1 | "Episode 1" | Ashley Way | Ed Whitmore | 26 April 2021 | 6.23 |
When primary school teacher Gemma goes missing in Manchester, surveillance officers Martin and Stella are tasked with observing the prime suspect, Gemma's boyfriend Greg Sullivan.
| 2 | "Episode 2" | Ashley Way | Ed Whitmore | 27 April 2021 | 4.97 |
Martin witnesses Greg coming to pieces in front of his eyes. But is this a guilty man trying to hide his secrets or a grieving partner on a mission to find Gemma?
| 3 | "Episode 3" | Ashley Way | Ed Whitmore | 28 April 2021 | 4.94 |
Martin goes on a mission to dig deeper into Carl Tuckman's murky past. Could this relate to Gemma's disappearance in the present?
| 4 | "Episode 4" | Ashley Way | Tom Farrelly | 29 April 2021 | 4.63 |
A birthday lunch held in Gemma's honour leads to secrets being exposed and a break for Martin comes from an unexpected source, as his illicit bond with Zoe deepens.
| 5 | "Episode 5" | Ashley Way | Ed Whitmore | 30 April 2021 (ITV Hub) | N/A |
Martin prepares Carl to confront Kate in the hopes of a confession, but the surveillance operation takes an unexpected turn leading to devastating consequences.

== Production and release ==
ITV commissioned Viewpoint in January 2020. The show was set to begin filming in the spring of 2020, but was cancelled due to the COVID-19 pandemic. Principal photography eventually began in August 2020 and was ITV's first drama series to begin shooting after the lockdowns which halted production. Filming took place at Space Studios in the city of Manchester and in other locations around the city, and finished in November 2020.

Viewpoint aired on ITV at 9pm across the final week of April 2021. The first episode was watched by 4.5 million overnight viewers, 26.3% of the total TV audience that evening. The first four episodes achieved an average of 3.8m viewers in overnight ratings; the fifth episode accrued at least 2.1m viewers via the ITV Hub.

=== Broadcast of Episode 5 ===
Just prior to the fourth episode's broadcast on 29 April, The Guardian reported that Clarke was the subject of allegations of sexual harassment and intimidation by 20 women, which he denied. Although episode 4 aired as planned, the finale of Viewpoint was pulled from its intended broadcast on 30 April, and was replaced by a new episode of It'll Be Alright on the Night. The final episode was instead released onto ITV's on-demand platform, ITV Hub (and STV Player), alongside previous episodes, for 48 hours. The episodes were streamed without advertisements.

International distribution of Viewpoint was also suspended.
