= SEARLS =

Irish singer, songwriter, musician

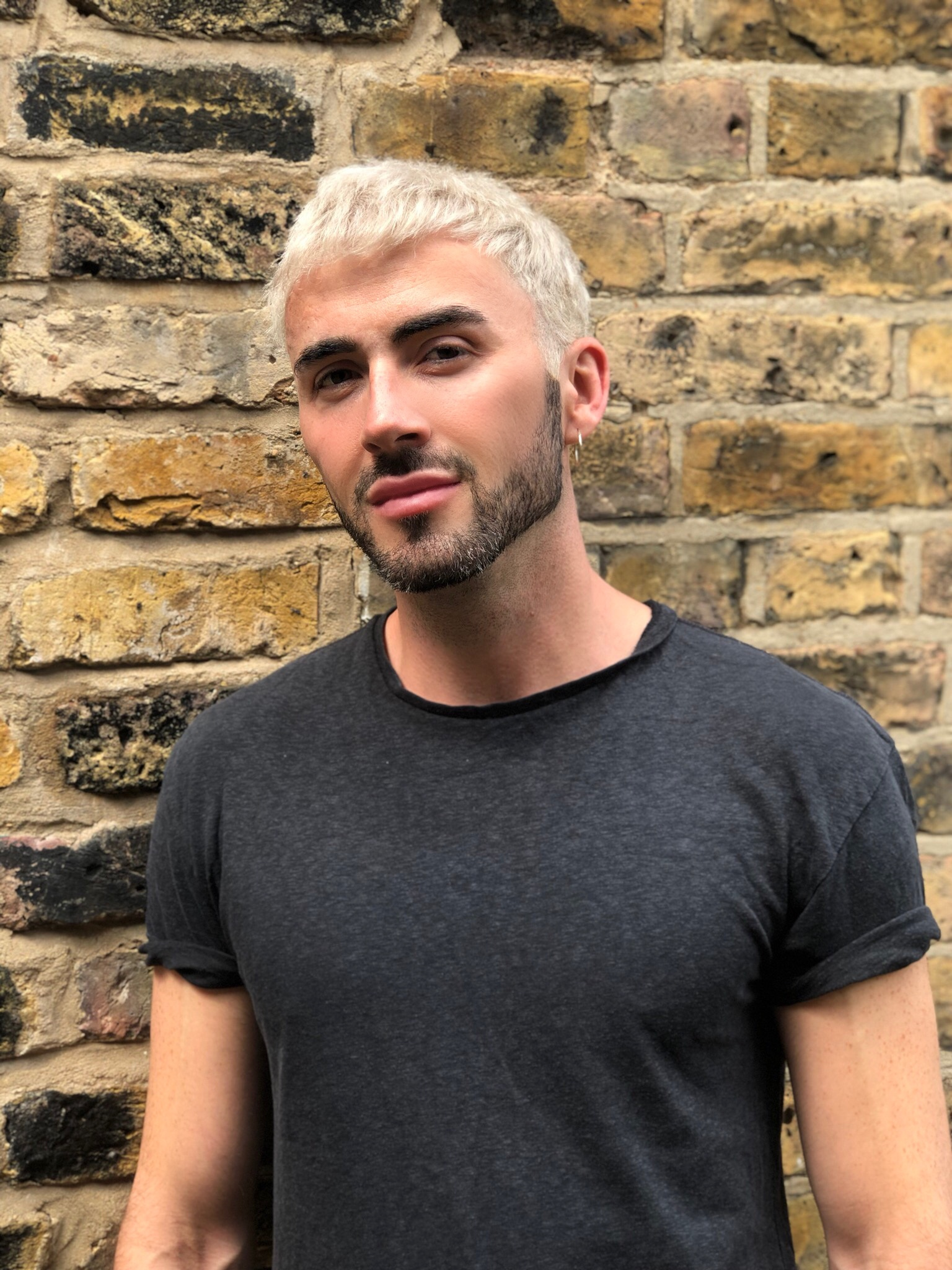
- SEARLS in 2019

Background information
- Born: Kinsale, Cork, Ireland
- Genres: Pop; R&B; electronica; soul
- Occupations: Singer; songwriter
- Instrument: Vocals
- Years active: 2015–present
- Website: searlsmusic.com

SEARLS also known as Jamie Searls is an Irish singer/songwriter, live vocalist and music industry educator.

== Career ==
=== Performance career ===
SEARLS acted as a leading man in London's West End, toured shows nationally and internationally and sang backing vocals for Adele and Elton John. He is best known for playing a leading male, Zayn Malik in the West End musical Only One Direction.

=== Original music ===
Following the release of viral hit single 'Doing Time' in 2015., which was remixed by prominent UK house producers including Sony Music's Kenny Hectyc, SEARLS released his debut EP 'Follow' in 2016. 'Demons' premiered in Clash Magazine. 'Hurricane' premiered in Wonderland.

Described as a sophisticated electronic-pop artist, he released 'SCAR' in 2018. SCAR was produced and co-written with Tileyard Music's Gil Lewis. The song was accompanied by a Wes Anderson inspired video release.

=== Education ===
In 2023, Searls was appointed as Managing Director of Tileyard Education, a postgraduate and undergraduate training institution which specialises in music business, music production, commercial songwriting and sound engineering education. Tileyard Education integrates academic study with professional opportunity.

Tileyard is a creative hub home to more than 200 music businesses such as SoundCloud, Ableton and Believe, and over 150 private recording studios, home to The Prodigy, Lily Allen and Noel Gallagher and more. Tileyard Music, the in-house record label, manages prominent artists like Sigala, Joel Corry, and Ella Eyre.

SEARLS graduated with a BA in Applied Psychology from University College Cork.

== Discography ==
=== EP ===
- Follow (2016)

=== Singles ===
- "Scar" (2018)
- "Demons" (2016)
- "Hurricane" (2016)
- "Follow" (2016)
- "Doing Time" (2015)
