= First Class Chefs =

- Genre: Cooking show
- Created by: The Walt Disney Company
- Starring: Michel Roux Jr.
- Country of origin: United Kingdom
- Original language: English
- No. of seasons: 1
- No. of episodes: 9

Production
- Production company: Fresh One Productions

Original release
- Network: Disney Channel
- Release: 22 June – 20 July 2015

First Class Chefs is a British television cooking series that airs on Disney Channel. The series stars the famous chef Michel Roux Jr. The series premiered in the United Kingdom on 22 June 2015. The series was produced by Fresh One Productions.

== Episodes ==
| No. overall | No. in series | Title | Original release date |
|---|---|---|---|
| 1 | 1 | "Heat One" | 22 June 2015 |
Three teams face a skills challenge including making an omelette and icing a cake, before making their own dish for Food Face Off. The teams are; The Two Cheeky Italians, The Ramen Rockers and The Frenemies. The Frenemies were eliminated.
| 2 | 2 | "Heat Two" | 23 June 2015 |
The second three teams face a skills challenge including making an omelette and cake icing before making their own dish for Food Face Off, to see who goes through to the next round.
| 3 | 3 | "Heat Three" | 29 June 2015 |
The next three teams face a skills challenge including making an omelette and cake icing before making their own dish for Food Face Off, to see who goes through to the next round.
| 4 | 4 | "Heat Four" | 30 June 2015 |
The final three teams face a skills challenge including making an omelette and cake icing before making their own dish for Food Face Off, to see who goes through to the next round.
| 5 | 5 | "First Quarter Final" | 6 July 2015 |
Four teams take part in a quick skills challenge, then prepare post-match snacks for a football team, to see which two teams go through to the semi-finals.
| 6 | 6 | "Second Quarter Final" | 7 July 2015 |
Four teams take part in a quick skills challenge, then prepare post-rehearsal snacks for a dance troupe, to see which two teams go through to the semi-finals.
| 7 | 7 | "First Semi-Final" | 13 July 2015 |
The four remaining teams face a quick skills challenge and then a celebrity VIP challenge, before learning which three will go through to the second semi- final.
| 8 | 8 | "Second Semi-Final" | 14 July 2015 |
Four teams take part in a quick skills challenge, then prepare post-rehearsal snacks for a dance troupe, to see which two teams go through to the semi-finals.
| 9 | 9 | "The Final" | 20 July 2015 |
Two teams battle it out to see which is crowned First Class Chefs 2015. The final episode sees Michel Roux Jr joined by daughter Emily as the finalists cook for surprise guests.
