= Five Acres High School =

Coordinates: 51.809°N 2.609°W

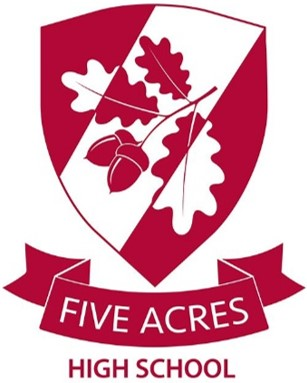
- Five Acres; Coleford, Gloucestershire, GL16 7QW; England

Information
- Type: Academy
- Established: 1914
- Department for Education URN: 144013 Tables
- Ofsted: Reports
- Head teacher: Simon Phelps
- Gender: Mix
- Age: 11 to 16
- Enrolment: 605
- Houses: Cannop, Clearwell, Ninewells, Lightmoor
- Colour
- Website: http://www.5acreshighschool.co.uk

Five Acres High School, formerly Lakers School, is an academy in Coleford, Gloucestershire. Simon Phelps is the Headteacher, Five Acres is an Academy which is sponsored by the Greenshaw Learning Trust.

Lakers School, which opened in 1985, closed on 31 August 2017. Lakers was converted to and became Five Acres High School. Five Acres opened on 1 September 2017. The reason for Lakers converting to an academy was because the School had been in Special Measures since January 2016, following the publication of a critical Ofsted inspection report, which branded every section in the report as inadequate subsequently meaning the school's overall effectiveness was also inadequate.

A year or so after the report was published the Regional Schools Commissioner gave Lakers confirmation that the Greenshaw Learning Trust was the preferred sponsor of the school and following consultation and talks it was announced the trust would take over in September.

== About Five Acres ==
The school was opened in 1914 as a small secondary school which was intended to serve only Berry Hill and Coleford. Known as Five Acres Council School, it opened in 1914 with new buildings at Five Acres capable of accommodating 260 students. The school buildings only originally covered the size of the present reception building along with four classrooms which only allowed students to stay on until they were 14. Five Acres Council School converted to a Secondary Modern under a new act introduced in 1944 and it was renamed Berry Hill Secondary Modern. Berry Hill Secondary eventually grew to become one of the biggest Secondary Modern's in Gloucestershire when the schools catchment area was increased, this mainly happened after other local schools were closed. Students from Joys Green and Lydbrook then started being admitted as the school become one of the only ones to serve Coleford and the surrounding area. At this time the site at Five Acres was home to the Royal Forest Of Dean Grammar School as well as Berry Hill Secondary. In 1985 these two schools amalgamated and formed Lakers Comprehensive School in its place with a College taking the Grammar School's place. The school is still situated on the same site as Gloucestershire College formerly Royal Forest Of Dean College. Due to them sharing the same site, the school has access to the facilities at The Five Acres Leisure Centre which is owned by the college.

In 2017, Lakers was closed after 32 years and the school converted to a Sponsor-Led Academy which was renamed Five Acres High School. To determine a new name for the converted academy which was set to replace the 32 year old Lakers School, a consultation survey was set up to ask current students and parents the question. On 15 May 2017 Lakers announced the new name would be 'Five Acres High School'. This option was chosen over a number of others including Nine Wells High School and Berry Hill Academy all using names from the school's surrounding area. Rebranding the School and using the Five Acres name means that the School has reverted to using part of its very first name, with the school originally being called 'Five Acres Council School'.

Simon Phelps is the current Headteacher of Five Acres High School. He became Headteacher following Ian Frost's departure. Ben Parnell had been Head but his departure came as he went to oversee other Schools within the Greenshaw Learning Trust. He had been head since Lakers converted to an Academy and Interim Head John Reilly left. John Reilly had been in charge at Lakers since the retirement of the longest serving head, Alison Elliott.

Five Acres High focus on the following as their core Ethos & Values: Ambition, Confidence, Creativity, Respect and Determination.
