= Silk (TV series) =

British television legal drama series

- Genre: Drama; Crime; Legal
- Created by: Peter Moffat
- Written by: Peter Moffat; Steve Thompson; Debbie O'Malley; Mick Collins; Colin Teevan
- Starring: Maxine Peake; Rupert Penry-Jones; Neil Stuke; John MacMillan; Theo Barklem-Biggs; Alex Jennings; Tom Hughes; Natalie Dormer; Nina Sosanya; Jamie Di Spirito; Frances Barber; Amy Wren; Phil Davis; Indira Varma; Shaun Evans; Miranda Raison; Jessica Henwick
- Country of origin: United Kingdom
- Original language: English
- No. of series: 3
- No. of episodes: 18 (list of episodes)

Production
- Executive producers: Hilary Salmon; Peter Moffat
- Producers: Cameron Roach (Series 1); Richard Stokes (Series 2); Matt Strevens (Series 3)
- Running time: 60 minutes
- Production company: BBC Productions

Original release
- Network: BBC One; BBC One HD
- Release: 22 February 2011 – 31 March 2014

Silk is a British television drama series produced by the BBC which was broadcast over three series on BBC One between 22 February 2011 and 31 March 2014. Created by Peter Moffat, the series follows the daily goings on of Shoe Lane Chambers and its members in their personal and professional lives.

== Origin ==
The series' writer, Peter Moffat, also wrote the series Criminal Justice and North Square, as well as an episode of Kavanagh QC. Before the series started, Moffat said in an interview, "I wanted Silk to be full of politics and intrigue. From my experience at the Bar, I felt life in chambers had all of those components, with big stories and lots of courtroom drama—but I wanted to make it as much about barristers and their life in chambers as about the trials".

Silk was commissioned by Jay Hunt, then-Controller of BBC One, and Ben Stephenson, BBC Controller of Drama Commissioning, and started filming in July 2010. It is based on Moffat's experiences at the Bar. In an interview with The Guardian, he said "I want to tell it as it really is. The extreme pressure, the hard choices, the ethical dilemmas, the overlap between the personal and the professional, principles fought for and principles sacrificed, the Machiavellian politics, the sex, the drinking, the whole story—life at the bar is the richest possible drama territory."

The series' title is a colloquial reference to someone who has attained the status of King's Counsel (QC or KC dependent on the current reigning monarch), which entitles the person to wear a certain design of gown in court, which is usually made of silk.

== Overview ==
Silk follows barristers from a set of criminal law chambers in London. The series' focuses on Martha Costello (Maxine Peake) and her ambition to become Queen's Counsel as well as on her rival, Clive Reader (Rupert Penry-Jones). Martha achieves her ambition at the end of Series One, leaving Clive disappointed. He however becomes a QC in the opening episode of Series 3. The chambers' senior clerk, Billy Lamb (Neil Stuke), also features heavily in the series. In series 3, Miranda Raison joins the show as Harriet Hammond who is a thorn in the side of Billy, as well as a confidante, supporter, and potential love interest for Clive Reader.

Silk ended with series 3 because creator Moffat and lead actress Maxine Peake were keen to end at a high point. Rupert Penry-Jones commented that:

"It’s a courtroom drama so it could go on and on and there is a whole echelon of stuff we could go into but it will be interesting to see what people make of this series because the way it is left, we as a cast aren’t sure whether it’s been written as, 'This is it', or whether it’s got more to come because it feels like everyone gets blasted in different directions at the end of this series, so maybe the writer has thrown a grenade in and blown the whole show up. But it will very much depend on how people react to it".

In March 2014, it was announced there would be a radio spin-off following the lives of the clerks of Shoe Lane Chambers.

It was announced that the series would be adapted by ABC for USA television. Peter Moffat was due to executive produce, with the pilot being written by Marty Scott.

== Cast ==
- Maxine Peake as Martha Costello QC, Barrister
- Rupert Penry-Jones as Clive Reader QC, Barrister
- Neil Stuke as Billy Lamb, Senior Clerk
- John MacMillan as John Bright, Clerk
- Theo Barklem-Biggs as Jake Milner, Junior Clerk
- Alex Jennings as Alan Cowdrey QC, Head of Chambers
- Tom Hughes as Nick Slade, a pupil who shadows Martha (Series 1)
- Natalie Dormer as Niamh Cranitch, a pupil who shadows Clive (Series 1)
- Nina Sosanya as Kate Brockman, Barrister (Series 1)
- Jamie Di Spirito as Jimmy Johnson, Junior Clerk (Series 1)
- Frances Barber as Caroline Warwick QC, Barrister (Series 2–3)
- Phil Davis as Mickey Joy, Solicitor (Main Cast Series 2, Guest Series 3)
- Indira Varma as George Duggan, CPS Solicitor (Series 2)
- Amy Wren as Bethany Brassington, Junior Clerk (Series 2–3)
- Shaun Evans as Daniel Lomas, a pupil who shadows Martha (Series 2)
- Miranda Raison as Harriet Hammond, Practice Manager (Series 3)
- Jessica Henwick as Amy Lang, a pupil who shadows Martha, Clive & Caroline (Series 3)

== Episode list ==
Series	Episodes	Originally released	
Series	Episodes	First released	Last released
1	6	22 February 2011	29 March 2011
2	6	15 May 2012	20 June 2012
3	6	24 February 2014	31 March 2014

=== Series 1 (2011) ===
No. overall	No. in series	Title	Directed by	Written by	Original release date	Viewers (millions)
1	1	"The Bitter End"	Michael Offer	Peter Moffat	22 February 2011	6.34
Martha represents a pregnant drugs mule as well as a man charged with robbery and assault on an elderly war hero.
2	2	"High and Dry"	Michael Offer	Peter Moffat	1 March 2011	5.67
Martha is pitted against Clive in the case of a man accused of raping his ex-girlfriend; during the trial, Martha discovers that she is pregnant.
3	3	"Close Quarters"	David Evans	Peter Moffat	8 March 2011	5.80
Martha takes on the case of a teenage rent-boy who is charged with indecency in a public lavatory. Niamh defends a couple accused of breeding dangerous dogs.
4	4	"Touch and Go"	David Evans	Peter Moffat	15 March 2011	5.84
Martha defends an Asian police officer accused of uttering a racial slur to a black colleague. Billy tries to get rid of Clive by asking a senior clerk from another chambers to offer him a job.
5	5	"All Plain Sailing"	Catherine Morshead	Steve Thompson	22 March 2011	5.74
Against her better judgment, Martha -- whose strong suit is defence -- is persuaded to prosecute in the case of a teacher accused of attempting to murder a pupil who persecuted him.
6	6	"Three Sheets to the Wind"	Catherine Morshead	Peter Moffat	29 March 2011	5.72
Martha defends the young rent-boy and his girlfriend, who inadvertently killed a judge after breaking into his house with the intention of robbing him. Martha is made a QC while Clive misses out.

=== Series 2 (2012) ===
No. overall	No. in series	Title	Directed by	Written by	Original release date	Viewers (millions)
7	1	"Famous Last Words"	Peter Hoar	Peter Moffat	15 May 2012	6.56
Martha, now a fully fledged QC and Clive defend a thug connected to a well-known crime family who is accused of blinding a man who fell foul of his boss.
8	2	"The House of Ill Repute"	Peter Hoar	Peter Moffat	22 May 2012	6.08
Martha defends a young Captain at a court-martial. He is accused of disobeying orders, and that his disobedience led to the death of an unarmed Private.
9	3	"In the Family Way"	Alice Troughton	Peter Moffat	29 May 2012	5.56
Martha defends a youth accused of trashing a corner shop after his girlfriend was insulted. Clive prosecutes three Oxford students accused of assaulting a young waitress.
10	4	"Wooden Overcoat"	Alice Troughton	Debbie O'Malley	5 June 2012	5.64
Martha defends a prison van driver accused of neglect and manslaughter after a claustrophobic prisoner dies while in his care.
11	5	"Shooting Blanks (Part 1)"	Jeremy Webb	Peter Moffat	12 June 2012	5.33
Caroline seeks out Clive's assistance in the prosecution of Jody Farr, in exchange for a deal for one of her clients.
12	6	"Shooting Blanks (Part 2)"	Jeremy Webb	Peter Moffat	20 June 2012	5.28
Martha decides to claim that Jody Farr was framed by the police as her first line of defence. Billy goes in for his operation.

=== Series 3 (2014) ===
No. overall	No. in series	Title	Directed by	Written by	Original release date	Viewers (millions)
13	1	"The Goodbye Kid"	Marc Jobst	Peter Moffat	24 February 2014	6.13
Clive who has now become a QC is celebrating with friends and colleagues but the party is interrupted when Alan's son is arrested on suspicion of the murder of a policeman, while Martha hits the bottle after an Inspector lies in court to frame her client.
14	2	"Big Fish, Small Pond"	Marc Jobst	Mick Collins	3 March 2014	5.42
Martha defends a footballer accused of attacking an opposing player during a match.
15	3	"Heavy Metal"	Michael Keillor	Colin Teevan	10 March 2014	5.16
Martha is approached by a euthanasia campaigner to defend a friend, who helped her paraplegic daughter to take her own life.
16	4	"Mother Country"	Michael Keillor	Christian Spurrier	17 March 2014	5.10
Martha is asked to help a solicitor whose nephew is wanted for extradition by the American authorities in relation to a bomb attack at an Arizona university.
17	5	"The Real McCoy (Part 1)"	Cilla Ware	Peter Moffat	24 March 2014	5.06
Martha goes into prison to visit an ex-lover who is accused of shooting dead gang leader Jimmy Monk, who demanded protection money for him to open a night club.
18	6	"The Real McCoy (Part 2)"	Cilla Ware	Peter Moffat	31 March 2014	5.33
Clive is forced to withdraw from the case, convinced of Sean McBride's guilt. Billy tries to help Martha by convincing Micky Joy to give evidence on police corruption. Harriet and Clive consummate their relationship.

== Home media ==
DVD title	Season	Episodes	Aspect Ratio	Running time	Year
Season One	1	6	16:9	360 minutes	12 November 2013
Season Two	2	6	16:9	352 minutes	1 March 2016
Season Three	3	6	16:9	300 minutes	—

== In other media ==
=== Radio ===
BBC Radio 4 featured a spin-off "Silk: The Clerks Room" that lasted for two seasons from 2014 to 2015, featuring Theo Barklem-Biggs as Jake, Neil Stuke as Billy, and Jessica Henwick as Amy.

== Critical reception ==
Writing in The Daily Telegraph, barrister Sarah Palin praised Silk, saying that "the opening episodes do a good job of capturing the relentless pressure of the criminal Bar" and that "the competition for silk, while a useful plot device, also accurately reflects the fiercely competitive nature of the Bar", but added "the characters featured are a little more youthful than their real-life counterparts" and that the storyline in which one of the pupil barristers shoplifts his wig and gown struck "an absurd note". The Telegraph's television reviewer, James Walton, compared the series to Moffat's previous production, North Square, but said that Silk was "more viewer-friendly" and the characters "far easier to divide into heroes and villains". He concluded that the first episode was "a perfectly OK hour of telly—marred only by the fact that we've come to expect a bit more than that from Moffat." Alex Aldridge of The Guardian, meanwhile, called the series "underwhelming" and stated that it implied that cocaine use was "rife" among criminal barristers. Also writing in The Guardian, Lucy Mangan implied that the series was predictable and called it "a rare misfire by Peter Moffat [...] and aggravated by the squandering of Peake, whose usually overflowing talents seem to have been dammed here rather than encouraged to irrigate an oddly bloodless role."

The first series averaged 5.85 million viewers. The second series averaged 5.74 million viewers. The third series averaged 5.37 million viewers.
