= Royal Ranch =

British web series

- Genre: Dramedy
- Starring: Mia Jenkins; Lucila Gandolfo
- Country of origin: United Kingdom
- Original language: English
- No. of seasons: 1
- No. of episodes: 3

Production
- Running time: 5-6 minutes
- Production company: The Walt Disney Company

Original release
- Network: Disney Channel App
- Release: 20 November 2017

Royal Ranch is a British teen dramedy miniseries produced for Disney Channel UK. The premiere took place on 20 November 2017 on the Disney Channel App in the UK and Ireland.

== Plot ==
Royal Ranch tells the story of Finny, a fun-loving, young girl who can handle horses very well, and lives with her grandmother Anne Marie. When Finny has to sell her beloved horse Lottie, so that her family is not insolvent, she is sad at first. But soon after, her life is turned upside down when Finny accepts King Oswald's offer to teach the warped twins Prince Arthur and Princess Henrietta how to ride. In the beginning, Finny believed she could easily master the challenge, but the twins have all sorts of crazy pranks ready and are very cheeky to Finny. Just as Finny starts to feel comfortable and having fun in San Morania, she comes closer to a family secret. And Finny unexpectedly meets Prince Eugen an ally in the midst of all the madness.

== Cast and characters ==
- Mia Jenkins as Finny
- Lucila Gandolfo as Anne Marie
- N.N. as Prince Eugene
- Ivan Espeche as King Oswald
- N.N. as Prince Arthur
- Emma Glinsky as Princess Henrietta
- N.N. as Nadine

== Episodes ==
| Season | Episodes | Originally released | |
| Season | Episodes | First released | Last released |
|---|---|---|---|
| 1 | 3 | 20 November 2017 | 20 November 2017 |

| No. overall | No. in season | Title | Directed by | Written by | Original release date |
|---|---|---|---|---|---|
| 1 | 1 | "A Reluctant Sale" | Unknown | Unknown | 20 November 2017 |
When Finny's beloved horse is sold so that her family does not become insolvent, Finny gathers all her strength and wins the game with her polo team. A mysterious spectator attentively follows Finny's triumph.
| 2 | 2 | "A Royal Invitation" | Unknown | Unknown | 20 November 2017 |
King Oswald of San Morania visits the horse farm Stablecroft together with the naughty twins Prince Arthur and Princess Henrietta. After the twins Finny have played a nasty pranks, Finny wants to get rid of the twins as soon as possible. But that will not be easy, because the king offers her the opportunity of her life.
| 3 | 3 | "Right Royal Trouble" | Unknown | Unknown | 20 November 2017 |
Finny and her grandmother Anne Marie are expected on their arrival at the castle by the servants and a lot of paparazzi. The twins think up one of their malicious pranks again. Still, Anne Marie is thrilled, but Finny wonders if she made the right decision. Unexpectedly, she meets an ally amid all the madness.

== Broadcast ==
The full first season was released on the Disney Channel App in the UK and Ireland on 20 November 2017. The individual episodes are also currently available on DisneyLife and on the YouTube channel of Disney Channel UK. In addition, the series is repeated in the British Disney Channel. The miniseries will gradually be released in other countries, including Germany, Italy, Austria, Switzerland and France.
