= Get the Look =

Television fashion programme

Get The Look is a Disney Channel UK and Ireland original 5-minute series. It is hosted by stylist Electra Formosa, and the show gives tips on fashion, style and clothing.

== Summary ==
The show begins with Electra introducing a certain topic. There are then three parts to the show:

- "Get the Look" - In this part, Electra looks at characters from Disney Channel shows and movies, and is inspired by their styles. She then shows viewers how to do the same thing.
- "Style It Up" - In this part, Electra is usually seen out and about, and she is inspired by Disney Channel characters, which she then models on different children.
- "Ka-ching!" - Electra returns to the studio and it is similar to Get the Look.

== Format ==
Electra gives tips to viewers on how to look stylish, as well as how to re-use old clothing to make better clothes. She uses inspiration from Disney stars, such as Selena Gomez, Miley Cyrus, Demi Lovato, Bella Thorne, Zendaya, Debby Ryan, Sterling Knight and Ross Lynch. She has tips for both girls and boys.

== Episodes ==
There were 30 episodes by April 2012. There are special guest stars in the episodes, including:

- Gregg Sulkin
- Debby Ryan
- Naomi Scott
- Jennifer Stone
- Bella Thorne
- Zendaya
- Davis Cleveland
- Roshon Fegan
- Ashley Tisdale

There are also special episodes, which have included:

- Sharpay Special - This premiered before the premiere of Sharpay's Fabulous Adventure and focused on Sharpay's look.
- Lemonade Mouth Special - Stylist Electra Formosa meets Naomi Scott, star of Disney Channel's hit movie Lemonade Mouth, and shows viewers how to achieve Naomi's rock chick look.
- Shake It Up Special - Stylist Electra Formosa shows viewers how to achieve the stylish look of Rocky and CeCe from Disney Channel's hit show Shake It Up.
- Debby Ryan Special: Character Styles - Stylist Electra Formosa looks at the fashion style of multi-talented young actress Debby Ryan, star of hit series The Suite Life on Deck and new series Jessie, and offers tips to viewers on how to achieve Debby's very special look. Debby Ryan joins her to chat about her character styles.
- Debby Ryan Special: New York Fashion - In this New York-themed episode, Debby Ryan talks to Electra about New York fashion, including the '50s retro look. Debby and Electra discuss lace and Electra "styles it up" with lace accessories.
- Get the Eco Look - Stylist Electra Formosa gets the eco fashion vibe as she shows viewers how to re-think, re-use and recycle by clothes swapping and learning not to throw it but sew it. Lemonade Mouth's Bridgit Mendler and Rocky and Cece from Shake It Up provide fashion inspiration. Eco cool rules!
- Get the Summer Look - On Friday 20 July 2012, as children broke up for summer holidays/vacation, Electra showed viewers how to achieve summer-style looks inspired by characters from shows such as Austin & Ally and So Random!.
- Teen Beach Movie Special - Premiered in Summer 2013, with fashion stylish tips from the stars of new movie Teen Beach Movie.

== Season 4 (2013) ==
Season 4 of the show began on 6 September 2013 at 5:25 PM, with brand new episodes airing every Friday in September, October and december. There were new sets, a new look, a Teen Beach Movie special (13 September) and a Violetta special (20 September). Below is a list of episodes in season 4:

- "Debby Ryan" (6 September 2013) - Electra shows viewers how to copy the look of Debby Ryan, including re-vamping jeans just like Debby does.
- "Teen Beach Movie Special" (13 September 2013) - Electra shows viewers how to copy the looks of the Teen Beach Movie characters. With guest appearances from Ross Lynch and Maia Mitchell.
- "Violetta Special" (20 September 2013) - Electra demonstrates Violetta's fashion style from the new show, including her girly romantic style, and her use of denim jackets.
- "Laura Marano" (27 September 2013) - Electra takes inspiration from Austin & Ally star Laura Marano, including how to achieve her floral, girly look, and she shows viewers how to create jewellery just like Laura wears.
- "Dog with a Blog Special" (4 October 2013) - Learn how to copy the looks of the Dog with a Blog cast, as Electra shows how to look like Avery, how to copy Tyler's style, and how to mix and match accessories like Chloe and Avery do.
- "A.N.T. Farm" (11 October 2013) - In this special episode, Electra is joined by China Anne McClain, and she shows viewers how to achieve China's style, as well as how to revamp and re-use leggings, just like Olive.
- "Get the Autumn Look" (18 October 2013) - In this seasonal special, Electra shows viewers the hottest trends and fashions for the Autumn and Winter.
- "Get the Halloween Look" (25 October 2013) - In this Halloween special episode, Electra shows viewers how to dress for a Halloween party, how to design your very own trick or treat basket, and shows viewers how to achieve the Halloween look of Trish in Austin & Ally.
- "Get the Christmas Look" (20 December 2013) - Electra shows viewers how to look good in the festive season, including how to create your very own Christmas-themed outfits, what to wear to Christmas and New Year parties, and how to achieve the cute Santa outfit as demonstrated by CeCe and Rocky from Shake It Up.

== Episode summaries ==
Below is a list of what happens in episodes (episode summaries). There are no specific titles or episode numbers for episodes.

- Electra Formosa takes her fashion inspiration from Sonny with a Chance's Nico Harris, Shake It Up's Flynn, and even Bea from Fish Hooks' nautical style.
- Stylist Electra Formosa talks to Wizards of Waverly Place star Gregg Sulkin about his fashion style, and helps viewers get the look of Suite Life on Deck's Bailey.
- Top stylist Electra Formosa is excited about the pink and black rock chick look of Wizards of Waverly Place's Bailey, and shows young viewers how to achieve it.
- Stylist Electra Formosa demonstrates tie-dyeing and how to get the layered look of Rocky and CeCe from Shake It Up. She also checks out Gregg Sulkin's skinny ties.
- Stylist Electra Formosa explores military styles, especially the look worn by Wizards of Waverly Place's Justin.
- The individual styles of Good Luck Charlie's Teddy and So Random!'s Brandon Mychal Smith, as well as Alex Russo's magical dress sense are three looks explored by stylist Electra Formosa.
- Stylist Electra Formosa is inspired by Derek from Good Luck Charlie to achieve a vintage rock look, and also shows viewers how to re-vamp old tights and gloves.
- Stylist Electra Formosa shows how to achieve the relaxed look of Austin from Austin & Ally, and styles it up with clashing prints, before passing on some tips on uses for old leggings.
- Electra shows fashion conscious viewers what to do with bows - Selena Gomez style. Gregg Sulkin demonstrates his urban cool look, and Electra paints old boots to look like CeCe's.
- Stylist Electra Formosa is inspired by Teddy from Good Luck Charlie's '70s look. She shows viewers how to copy Alex Russo's batwing top and fringeing as worn by Shake It Up's CeCe.

== Website ==
There is a section on the Disney Channel UK website for Get the Look. It features videos and a game in which players choose their own look and make their own clothing line, which they must try and sell to designers.
