= Hannah-Oke =

British karaoke game show

Hannah-Oke is a British karaoke game show based on the hit TV series Hannah Montana that premiered on Disney Channel UK on 15 May 2009 and weekly at 6pm.

The show sees six families from across the UK putting their singing abilities and Hannah song knowledge to the test in a series of challenges and karaoke sing-offs in front of a studio audience and panel of judges. The panel consists of Disney Channel UK star Brad Kavanagh, Pop Idol participant Nicki Chapman and Dancing on Ice participant Jason Gardiner. The audience then votes for the winning family, who will go through to the final. In the event of a tie-break, the judges vote and the family with the most votes goes through. The three final families then go head-to-head for the title of Hannah-Oke Champion 2009. The winning family receives a trip to Disneyland Paris, a karaoke machine, a Hannah Montana singstar game and a gold disk signed by Miley Cyrus.

== Format ==
There are a variety of activities throughout the show.

The first activity is a sing-off where both families each sing a line of a Hannah Montana song. The judges pick one solo star to sing on their own, who go backstage to get vocal lessons.

There is a second activity for the other families while the solo stars are having vocal lessons. Each family dances the "Hoedown Throwdown" from Hannah Montana: The Movie with Billy Ray Cyrus shouting out the moves, but when he says something that isn't one of the moves, the audience shouts "Silly Billy".

The songs sung by the soloists on each episode are:

- Episode 1: "Butterfly Fly Away"
- Episode 2: "The Climb"
- Episode 3: "The Climb"

After this, the audience votes for the winning family, by holding up red or blue cards. In the event of a tie, the judges each vote for the families, and the family with the most votes goes through to the final.

Every episode finishes with both families, and Duncan James and Konnie Huq, singing "Best of Both Worlds".

Hannah-Oke 2009 was won by the Williams family (the blue team), who won the signed Miley Cyrus gold disk and the family trip to Paris.
