= Life Bites =

- Genre: Comedy
- Starring: Amy Wren; Benedict Smith; Tianna Webster; Rupert Simonian; Nicola Posener; Lucien Laviscount; Dominique Moore; Jeremy Irvine; Naomi Scott
- Country of origin: United Kingdom
- Original language: English
- No. of series: 2
- No. of episodes: 28

Original release
- Network: Disney Channel UK
- Release: September 16, 2008 – August 16, 2009

Related
- Life Bites – Pillole di vita

Life Bites is a British adaptation of the Italian series Life Bites – Pillole di vita by Disney Channel Italy. It premiered on 6 September 2008. The show series looks at the everyday adventures of Chloe and Harvey, who are brother and sister and their relationships with family and friends. Each episode looks at variety of themes including school, dating, sport and music. The school which they attend is filmed at Brentside High School in Hanwell, West London.

The first season premiered on 6 September 2008 and has 16 episodes; the second season started in July 2009 and has 12 episodes, including a Halloween special and a Christmas special.

== Cast ==
=== Main ===
- Amy Wren as Chloe
- Benedict Smith as Harvey, brother of Chloe
- Tianna Webster as Molly, younger sister of Chloe and Harvey
- Nicola Posener as Pyper, Chloe's best friend
- Naomi Scott as Megan, Pyper's and Chloe's best friend
- Rupert Simonian as Frank, classmate
- Lucien Laviscount as Jake, Harvey's best friend
- Dominique Moore as Esther, Chloe's and Pyper's best friend
- Jeremy Irvine as Luke, Harvey and Frank's best friend

=== Recurring ===
- Neil Roberts as Richard
- Andrea Spisto as Jenni
- Claire Cage as Mum
- Brad Kavanagh as band member in Harvey's, Frank's and Luke's band
