= Disney Channel (United Kingdom and Ireland) =

British children's television channel (1995–2020)

- Final logo used from 1 February 2017 to 1 October 2020
- Country: United Kingdom
- Broadcast area: British Isles
- Headquarters: 12 Chiswick Park, Chiswick, London, England W4 5AN

Programming
- Language: English
- Picture format: HDTV 1080i; SDTV 576i
- Timeshift service: Disney Channel +1

Ownership
- Owner: The Walt Disney Company Limited; Disney Channels Worldwide (Walt Disney Direct-to-Consumer & International)
- Sister channels: Disney Jr. (2000-2020; relaunched in 2025); Disney XD (1996-2020)

History
- Launched: 1 October 1995; 31 years ago
- Closed: 1 October 2020; 6 years ago
- Replaced by: Disney+ (most of its content)
- Former names: The Disney Channel (1995–1997)

Disney Channel was a children's pay television channel that operated in the UK and Ireland from 1 October 1995 to 1 October 2020 as the variant of the namesake American television channel. It was owned and operated by The Walt Disney Company Limited, the EMEA arm of the Walt Disney Company and served audiences under age 18 in the region. During its operation, Disney Channel was supported by a one-hour timeshift channel, Disney Channel +1, which was available on Sky and Virgin Media.

== History ==
=== Development (1984–1995) ===
In 1984, Disney Channel UK was set to become the first Disney Channel outside the US with support from the British cable companies of the time to deliver the service within a 2-3 year window. The idea was revived in 1989, this time with support from Sky Television, a former British satellite television company. The channel was to feature promotional material for Sky Television and the Astra satellite. However, a proposed joint venture between Disney and Sky Television was cancelled. Disputes over decision-making responsibilities led to Sky suing Disney for £1.5 billion in damages. Disney argued that it sought more influence over decisions and was unwilling to fund its share of the venture.

The lawsuit was eventually settled, and Disney sold its stake in the joint venture to Sky. As a result, Sky gained access to the Walt Disney Pictures movie library for five years.

In December 1994, following the expiration of its agreement with Sky, The Walt Disney Company announced plans to independently launch The Disney Channel in the United Kingdom. The channel, which was set to debut in fall 1995, would be available as a subscription service through a deal with British Sky Broadcasting. Subscribers to Sky's movie package could receive The Disney Channel for free, while it was also offered as a standalone package.

In January 1994, Disney announced a joint venture with CLT Multi Media to launch Super RTL in Germany, which successfully launched in April 1995.

=== Launch and early history (1995–1997) ===
On 25 August 1995, it was confirmed that The Disney Channel would launch in the UK and Ireland on 1 October 1995. The channel, broadcasting daily from 6 am to 10 pm on channel 26 and sharing with Sky Movies Gold on the Astra 1B satellite service, was subscription-only and free of advertising. Its programming was designed for all family members and included dramas, comedies, cartoons, documentaries, and films from Disney's archives, including the UK television premiere of The Jungle Book. Mellors Reay & Partners handled the channel's launch advertising, with media services managed by BBJ Media Services Ltd.

The Disney Channel's studios and broadcast facilities were initially located at Teddington Studios. In late 1996, they were relocated to Stephen Street, where Thames Television's original headquarters had been. Pearson plc provided playout and transmission services for the channel.

Within two weeks of its launch, Disney Channel UK began discussions with the Independent Television Commission (ITC) regarding the promotion of Disney products and services on the channel. Although the channel did not carry traditional advertising, the ITC proposed clear breaks for self-promotion, marked by the on-screen Disney Consumer Arcade motif. In July 1997, the ITC criticised Disney Channel's marketing practices, noting that it was offered for free to customers who subscribed to Sky's premium film channels. Disney Channel agreed to make adjustments, including increasing programme continuity and launching Disney Channel UK Live, a new live block.

=== Launch of sister channels (1998–2005) ===
On 2 March 1998, Disney Channel UK became available as a separate premium channel on Sky and cable operators. To promote this, Disney Channel offered three days of free programming from 21 to 23 March 1998. Paul Robinson was appointed managing director on 6 December 1998, overseeing day-to-day operations.

On 15 February 1999, Disney Channel introduced a nightly movie slot at 7 pm, which saw a 300% increase in viewership after a promotional campaign featuring a lounge set with Disney-themed decor. The channel's schedule was restructured on 1 September 1999, introducing a Playhouse Disney-branded preschool block and various programming changes.

On 29 September 2000, Disney Channel launched three "multiplexed" channels: two sister channels Playhouse Disney and Toon Disney, and a 1-hour timeshift service called Disney Channel +1. These additions aimed to cater to different age groups and programming needs, and were available free of charge to digital customers who already subscribed to the main Disney Channel, similar to premium movie channels. The Playhouse Disney programming block continued to air until July 2004. In May 2001, Disney Channel introduced Studio Disney UK, a live block featuring interstitials between programmes. On 30 June 2001, the channel closed on Sky's analogue service, transitioning to digital.

By 2002, Disney Channel UK moved to new facilities at Chiswick Park. On 17 August 2004, Disney Channel Play, a games service, was launched on Sky Gamestar. In September 2004, the channel expanded to a 24-hour service.

=== Switch to basic cable services (2006–2020) ===
On 16 March 2006, Disney Channel and Playhouse Disney shifted from premium channels to basic-level subscription packages. Disney Cinemagic replaced Toon Disney, while Disney Channel +1 returned in June 2006. In late 2007, Disney Channel joined Sky's Picnic service, which later became Now TV in 2012.

In January 2009, Disney Channel UK launched an in-house sales team for commercial deals while remaining advertising-free. The channel began broadcasting in widescreen format in May 2010 and adopted a new logo in September 2011, with an HD version launching on Sky and UPC Ireland.

By 2012, Encompass took over as the playout provider for Disney Channel. On 1 July 2013, Disney Channel and Disney Junior began carrying advertising. Disney Cinemagic closed on 27 March 2013, with the channel relaunched as Sky Movies Disney. Disney Channel was removed from Now TV in 2016, and Nat Geo Wild replaced it on the original slot. Disney+ replaced internet service DisneyLife in March 2020, no longer including linear television channels.

=== Closure due to Disney+ (2020) ===
On 3 June 2020, Disney announced that David Levine, vice president of children's programming for Disney's EMEA channels, and general manager for Disney Channel UK, would be departing away from the company on 30 June 2020. On 25 June 2020, it was announced that following the launch of Disney+ in the UK, and due to the company's failure to reach a new carriage deal agreement with Sky and Virgin Media, Disney Channel UK would close on 1 October 2020.

"From October 1, Disney+ will become the exclusive home for content from Disney Channel, Disney XD and Disney Junior in the UK." announced a spokesperson for the company. "The direct-to-consumer service, which garnered more than 54.5 million subscribers worldwide in its first seven months, will now premiere all the latest films, series and specials from the three Disney channels, along with offering an expansive back catalogue of Disney channel titles in the UK, including Mickey Mouse Clubhouse, Descendants 3 and Phineas & Ferb. The Walt Disney Company remains committed to our kids’ channels business and continues to execute distribution agreements for Disney channels in many markets where Disney+ is also available, with the goal of giving our fans multiple entry points to our storytelling."

The channel, along with Disney Junior and Disney XD, closed down at midnight BST on 1 October 2020, exactly 25 years after its launch. The final programme aired was the 2019 film Descendants 3. The channels were removed entirely from Virgin Media on 29 September, with CBBC and CBeebies began taking over their Sky EPG slots on 1 October. The YouTube channel for Disney Channel UK remained active, but was renamed to Disney Club UK in the later years, thus effectively ending the Disney Channel brand for the UK.

In November 2020, Disney returned its broadcast licenses for Disney Channel UK, Disney XD UK, and Disney Junior UK to Ofcom, with new European licenses being handled by Spain's CNMC due to Brexit. Sky Cinema Disney also closed on 30 December 2020, making Disney+ the primary source for Disney movies in the UK and Ireland. Following Fox UK's closure in 2021, National Geographic and BabyTV were the only Disney-owned pay television channels in the UK.

After Disney Channel UK's shutdown, Disney vacated its Chiswick Park building, returning it to the landlord in June 2021. Disney continues to operate its EMEA headquarters in Hammersmith, London.

== Programming ==
The channel's programming primarily consisted of syndicated shows from its American counterpart, but it also featured UK and Irish series such as The Lodge, Stick with Me, Kid, and Sadie Sparks. Disney Channel UK also aired a variety of local programming, including Life Bites (a localized version of Life Bites – Pillole di vita), As the Bell Rings (a localized version of Quelli dell'intervallo), Hannah-Oke (a karaoke series featuring songs from Hannah Montana), Get the Look, First Class Chefs, Access All Areas, and Royal Ranch.

In March 2014, Disney Channel announced Evermoor, a multi-part movie filmed in the UK and later developed into The Evermoor Chronicles television series. It became the first long-form British series to air on the American Disney Channel. The series was produced by Lime Pictures and Disney's EMEA television studio.

On 18 March 2019, Disney Channel UK premiered 101 Dalmatian Street, a locally produced animated series inspired by Disney's 101 Dalmatians franchise and Dodie Smith's original novel. The series was developed by Disney's London animation team, Passion Animation Studios, and Atomic Cartoons.

== Logos ==
1995–1997

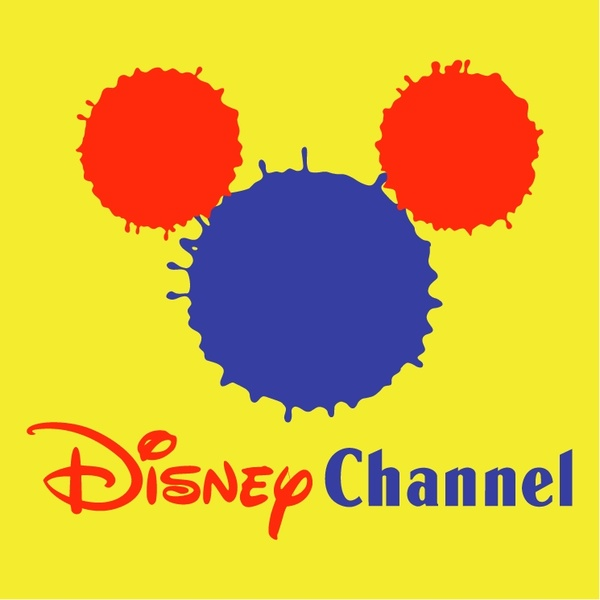
1997–2003

2003–2011

2011–2014

18 July 2014 – 6 February 2017

6 February 2017 – 30 September 2020

== See also ==
- Disney Channel
- Disney Jr.
- Disney XD
- Disney Cinemagic
