= List of programs broadcast by Disney Jr. (block) =

List of Disney Junior programs

This is a list of television programs broadcast on the Disney Jr. block on Disney Channel in the United States.

== Current programming ==
=== Original programming ===
Title	Premiere date	Source(s)
Spidey and His Amazing Friends	August 6, 2021	
SuperKitties (Note: Disney is named in the credits, but Disney's studios did not produce the show.)	January 11, 2023	
Pupstruction	June 14, 2023	
Ariel	June 27, 2024	
Robogobo	January 17, 2025	
Mickey Mouse Clubhouse+	July 21, 2025	
Iron Man and His Awesome Friends	August 11, 2025	
Hey A.J.!	January 13, 2026	
Magicampers	March 23, 2026	
Sofia the First: Royal Magic	May 25, 2026	

=== Acquired programming ===
Title	Premiere date	Source(s)
Bluey (Note: Co-production.)	September 9, 2019	
Beddybyes	March 2, 2026	
Gracie's Corner	June 16, 2026	

=== Interstitial programming ===
- Ariel: Mermaid Tales
- Chip 'N Dale's Nutty Tales
- Spookley Music Videos
- Sunny Bunnies
- Me & Mickey
- Me & Winnie the Pooh
- Meet Spidey and His Amazing Friends
- Mickey Mouse: Hot Diggity-Dog Tales
- Mickey's Mousekersize
- Minnie's Bow-Toons
- Playdate with Winnie the Pooh

== Upcoming programming ==
=== Original programming ===
Title	Premiere date	Source(s)
Cars: Lightning Racers	2027	
Marvel's Avengers: Mightiest Friends	2027	
Tiny Trailblazers	TBA	
Dusty Dupree	TBA	
Sam Witch	TBA	

== Former programming ==
=== Original programming ===
Title	Premiere date	End date	Source(s)
Disney Channel Little Kids
Bear in the Big Blue House (Note: The Walt Disney Company acquired Bear in the Big Blue House from The Jim Henson Company in 2004. The transaction included all of the series' characters, television library, copyrights and trademarks.)	October 25, 1997	May 5, 2007	
PB&J Otter	March 21, 1998	April 8, 2005	
Out of the Box	October 10, 1998	June 10, 2005	
Playhouse Disney
The Book of Pooh	January 27, 2001	September 4, 2005	
Stanley	September 15, 2001	May 16, 2008	
JoJo's Circus	September 20, 2003	June 28, 2008	
Higglytown Heroes	September 11, 2004	August 31, 2010	
Little Einsteins (Note: Program transitioned from the Playhouse Disney block.)	October 9, 2005	December 18, 2015	
Johnny and the Sprites	October 15, 2005	January 2, 2009	
Mickey Mouse Clubhouse	May 5, 2006	April 22, 2020	
Handy Manny	September 16, 2006	February 14, 2013	
My Friends Tigger & Pooh	May 12, 2007	October 9, 2010	
Bunnytown	November 10, 2007	December 21, 2008	
Imagination Movers	September 6, 2008	April 14, 2013	
Special Agent Oso	April 4, 2009	May 17, 2012	
Jungle Junction	October 5, 2009	April 30, 2013	
Disney Jr.
Jake and the Never Land Pirates	February 14, 2011	November 6, 2016	(Note: Is also a live-action series)
Doc McStuffins	March 23, 2012	April 20, 2020	
Sofia the First	January 11, 2013	May 26, 2023	
Henry Hugglemonster	April 15, 2013	August 10, 2015	
Sheriff Callie's Wild West	January 20, 2014	December 9, 2016	
Miles from Tomorrowland	February 6, 2015	March 26, 2018	
Goldie & Bear	September 12, 2015	April 30, 2018	
The Lion Guard	November 22, 2015	September 7, 2018	
Elena of Avalor	July 22, 2016	March 6, 2020	
Mickey Mouse Mixed-Up Adventures	January 15, 2017	April 4, 2023	
Puppy Dog Pals	April 14, 2017	March 17, 2023	
Vampirina	October 1, 2017	April 10, 2020	
Muppet Babies	March 23, 2018	December 21, 2022	
Fancy Nancy	September 10, 2018	April 2, 2020	
T.O.T.S.	June 14, 2019	July 30, 2021	
The Rocketeer	November 8, 2019	March 13, 2020	
Mira, Royal Detective	March 20, 2020	December 4, 2020	
The Chicken Squad	May 14, 2021	December 21, 2021	
Alice's Wonderland Bakery	February 9, 2022	January 10, 2023	
Firebuds	September 21, 2022	December 4, 2025	
Star Wars: Young Jedi Adventures	May 4, 2023	December 8, 2025	
Kindergarten: The Musical	September 3, 2024	May 23, 2025	

=== Acquired programming ===
Title	Premiere date	End date	Source(s)
Disney Channel Block
Mickey's Mouse Tracks	April 6, 1997	September 1, 2000	
TaleSpin	April 6, 1997	October 2, 1998	
Donald's Quack Attack	April 6, 1997	December 25, 1998	
Goof Troop	April 6, 1997	October 19, 1997	
Chip 'n Dale Rescue Rangers	April 6, 1997	August 29, 1999	
Henry's Amazing Animals (Note: Co-production.)	April 6, 1997	January 2, 2000	
The Little Mermaid	April 7, 1997	September 29, 2002	
The New Adventures of Winnie the Pooh	April 7, 1997	August 1, 2006	
Adventures in Wonderland	April 7, 1997	June 5, 1998	
Welcome to Pooh Corner	April 7, 1997	May 30, 1997	
Disney's Adventures of the Gummi Bears	April 7, 1997	August 29, 1997	
Care Bears	April 7, 1997	May 30, 1997	
My Little Pony Tales	April 7, 1997	May 30, 1997	
DuckTales	April 7, 1997	November 4, 2000	
The Charlie Brown and Snoopy Show	April 7, 1997	August 29, 1997	
Katie and Orbie	June 2, 1997	December 31, 1999	
Madeline	June 2, 1997	September 4, 2005	
Jungle Cubs	September 15, 1997	September 3, 2000	
Rolie Polie Olie	October 3, 1998	June 2, 2006	
101 Dalmatians: The Series	October 5, 1998	July 16, 1999	
Sing Me a Story with Belle	October 5, 1998	September 3, 2000	
Playhouse Disney
Rupert	September 4, 2000	January 2001	
The Wiggles	June 17, 2002	May 24, 2009	
Anatole	September 17, 2002	September 13, 2004	
The Koala Brothers	January 26, 2004	May 16, 2008	
Charlie and Lola	March 21, 2005	May 29, 2011	
The Doodlebops	April 11, 2005	January 2, 2009	
Chuggington	January 18, 2010	September 16, 2015	
Timmy Time	September 13, 2010	May 27, 2011	
Disney Junior
Babar and the Adventures of Badou	February 14, 2011	March 22, 2012	
Tinga Tinga Tales	February 14, 2011	November 17, 2011	
3rd & Bird	September 26, 2011	June 1, 2012	
Octonauts	January 9, 2012	June 8, 2016	
Gaspard and Lisa	March 26, 2012	June 7, 2013	
Ella the Elephant	February 17, 2014	December 13, 2014	
Kate & Mim-Mim	February 19, 2015	November 27, 2016	
PJ Masks	September 18, 2015	May 29, 2020	
P. King Duckling	November 19, 2016	2017	
Gigantosaurus	January 18, 2019	March 16, 2020	

=== Interstitial programming ===
==== Live-action ====
- A Poem Is
- Behind the Ears (1997–2000; 2007–2009)
- Breakfast with Bear (June 20, 2005 – September 15, 2006)
- Circle Time (April 6, 1997 – September 29, 2002)
  - Curious George (April 6, 1997 – 1999)
  - Paddington (1997)
  - Will Quack Quack (April 6, 1997 – 1999)
- Choo Choo Soul (May 1, 2006 – 2010s)
- Dan Zanes House Party (June 5, 2006 – December 19, 2008)
- Fuzzy Tales (2011 – 2010s)
- Joke Time (April 6, 1997 – September 29, 2002)
- Mike's Super Short Show (January 1, 2002 – 2007)
- Project Playtime (2003–2007)
- Quiet Is...
- Sharing Time (September 30, 2002 – 2005)
- Special Agent Oso: Three Healthy Steps
- This is Daniel Cook (July 11, 2005 – January 2, 2009)
- This is Emily Yeung (February 20, 2007 – January 4, 2009)
- Where Is Warehouse Mouse? (2009 – 2014)
- Who, What & Where with Bear Time (September 30, 2002 – 2004)
- Wiggles Time (January 28, 2002 – 2003)

==== Animated ====
- Adventures in Nutrition with Captain Carlos (2004–2007)
- BB's Music Time (September 30, 2002 – 2007)
- Big Block SingSong (2012 – 2010s)
- The Bite–Sized Adventures of Sam Sandwich
- Can You Teach My Alligator Manners? (2008 – 2010s)
- Dance-a-Lot Robot (2010 – 2013)
- Feeling Good with JoJo (February 20, 2006 – 2008)
- Feet Beat (1997 – October 6, 2002)
- Felix and the Flying Machine (2004–2007)
- Go, Baby! (January 1, 2005 – 2007)
- Good Manners with Max Time (September 30, 2002 – 2007)
- Handy Manny's School for Tools (2010 – 2010s)
- Happy Monster Band (October 1, 2007 – 2010s)
- Here Come the ABCs (January 1, 2005 – 2006)
- Here Come the 123s (2007)
- Lou and Lou: Safety Patrol (June 16, 2006 – 2010s)
- Magic Drawings (1997 – April 15, 2001)
- Mickey's Letter Time (September 30, 2002 – 2006)
- Mini Movies (April 16, 2001 – September 29, 2002)
  - The Adventures of Spot (April 6, 1997 – September 29, 2002)
  - Animal Stories (1999 – September 29, 2002)
  - Frankenguy & The Professor (November 1997 – September 29, 2002)
  - Microscopic Milton (1997 – September 29, 2002)
  - Pablo the Little Red Fox (1999 – September 29, 2002)
- Mini Show-and-Tell Time (2003–2007)
  - Higglytown Heroes (2003)
  - Johnny and the Sprites (October 9, 2005 – January 13, 2007)
  - Marcel's Animal Friends (2003)
- Ooh, Aah & You (July 15, 2005 – 2011)
- Page's Word of the Day (September 30, 2002 – 2007)
- Poky and Friends (1999 – April 15, 2001)
- Shane's Kindergarten Countdown (2005 – 2011)
- Shanna's Show (2003 – 2011)
- Stanley's Animal Facts (2001–2006)
- Tasty Time with ZeFronk (November 8, 2008 – 2010s)
- Use Your Noodle Time (September 30, 2002 – 2005)
- Whiffle and Fuzz (2008 – 2011)

=== Programming blocks ===
- Super Duper Playhouse Disney Special Event (2002–2005)
- Movie Time Monday (2005–2010); movies aired:
  - A Bug's Life
  - Aladdin
  - Aladdin and the King of Thieves
  - Alice in Wonderland
  - The Aristocats
  - Beauty and the Beast: The Enchanted Christmas
  - The Care Bears' Big Wish Movie
  - Care Bears: Journey to Joke-a-lot
  - Chicken Little
  - Cinderella II: Dreams Come True
  - Cinderella III: A Twist in Time
  - Finding Nemo
  - Hercules
  - Lady and the Tramp II: Scamp's Adventure
  - Lilo & Stitch
  - The Many Adventures of Winnie the Pooh
  - Mickey, Donald, Goofy: The Three Musketeers
  - Mickey's Once Upon a Christmas
  - Mickey's Twice Upon a Christmas
  - Monsters, Inc.
  - Mulan
  - Mulan II
  - My Little Pony: A Very Minty Christmas
  - Oliver & Company
  - Our Huge Adventure
  - Piglet's Big Movie
  - Pocahontas
  - Pocahontas II: Journey to a New World
  - Pooh's Grand Adventure: The Search for Christopher Robin
  - Pooh's Heffalump Movie
  - Pooh's Heffalump Halloween Movie
  - Robin Hood
  - Rolie Polie Olie: The Great Defender of Fun
  - Rolie Polie Olie: The Baby Bot Chase
  - Racing to the Rainbow
  - Santa's Rockin'!
  - Spookley the Square Pumpkin
  - Springtime with Roo
  - Stanley's Dinosaur Round-Up
  - Stanley's Great Big Book of Adventure
  - Tarzan
  - Tarzan II
  - The Emperor's New Groove
  - The Jungle Book 2
  - The Lion King II: Simba's Pride
  - The Little Mermaid: Ariel's Beginning
  - The Tigger Movie
  - Toy Story
  - Toy Story 2

== See also ==
- List of programs broadcast by Disney Jr. (24/7 channel)
- List of programs broadcast by Disney Channel
- List of programs broadcast by Disney XD
