= List of programs broadcast by Disney Jr. =

This is a list of television programs broadcast on the cable and satellite TV channel Disney Jr. in the United States.

== Current programming ==
=== Original programming ===
Title	Premiere date	Source(s)
Mickey Mouse Clubhouse (Note: Ended but still airing reruns.)	March 23, 2012	
Mickey Mouse Mixed-Up Adventures	January 15, 2017	
Mickey Mouse Funhouse	July 16, 2021	
Spidey and His Amazing Friends	August 6, 2021	
SuperKitties	January 11, 2023	
Pupstruction	June 14, 2023	
Ariel	June 27, 2024	
RoboGobo	January 17, 2025	
Mickey Mouse Clubhouse+	July 21, 2025	
Iron Man and His Awesome Friends	August 11, 2025	
Hey A.J.!	January 13, 2026	
Magicampers	March 23, 2026	
Sofia the First: Royal Magic	May 25, 2026	

=== Acquired programming ===
Title	Premiere date	Source(s)
PJ Masks (Note: Co-production)	September 18, 2015	
Bluey	September 9, 2019	
BeddyByes	March 2, 2026	
Gracie's Corner	June 15, 2026	

=== Interstitial programming ===
- Ariel: Mermaid Tales
- Chip 'N Dale's Nutty Tales
- Disney Tsum Tsum
- Me & Mickey
- Me & Winnie the Pooh
- Playdate with Winnie the Pooh
- Meet Iron Man and His Awesome Friends
- Meet Spidey and His Amazing Friends
- Mickey Mouse: Hot Diggity-Dog Tales
- Mickey's Mousekersize
- Minnie's Bow-Toons
- Megan and Cupcake Ready for School
- SuperKitties Su-Purr Adventures

== Upcoming programming ==
=== Original programming ===
Title	Premiere date	Source(s)
Cars: Lightning Racers	2027	
Avengers: Mightiest Friends	2027	
Sam Witch	TBA	

== Former programming ==
=== Original programming ===
Title	Premiere date	End date	Source(s)
Doc McStuffins	March 23, 2012	June 26, 2024	
Handy Manny	March 23, 2012	September 21, 2018	
Imagination Movers	March 23, 2012	May 16, 2014	
Special Agent Oso	March 23, 2012	December 25, 2016	
Jungle Junction	March 23, 2012	August 12, 2016	
Jake and the Never Land Pirates	March 23, 2012	December 1, 2017	(Note: Is also a live-action series)
Sofia the First	November 18, 2012	May 17, 2026	
Henry Hugglemonster	April 15, 2013	November 30, 2015	
Sheriff Callie's Wild West	January 20, 2014	February 13, 2017	
Miles from Tomorrowland	February 6, 2015	September 10, 2018	
Goldie & Bear	September 12, 2015	October 22, 2018	
The Lion Guard	November 22, 2015	August 19, 2026	
Elena of Avalor	July 22, 2016	August 23, 2020	
Puppy Dog Pals	April 14, 2017	November 23, 2023	
Vampirina	October 1, 2017	October 29, 2023	
Muppet Babies	March 23, 2018	May 29, 2023	
Fancy Nancy	July 13, 2018	April 2, 2023	
T.O.T.S.	June 14, 2019	November 22, 2023	
The Rocketeer	November 8, 2019	December 25, 2020	
Mira, Royal Detective	March 20, 2020	November 13, 2023	
The Chicken Squad	May 14, 2021	December 24, 2022	
Alice's Wonderland Bakery	February 9, 2022	April 15, 2024	
Eureka!	June 22, 2022	March 24, 2023	
Firebuds	September 21, 2022	March 1, 2026	
Star Wars: Young Jedi Adventures	May 4, 2023	May 4, 2026	
Kindergarten: The Musical	September 3, 2024	July 18, 2025	

=== Acquired programming ===
Title	Premiere date	End date	Source(s)
Chuggington	March 23, 2012	November 15, 2021	
The Koala Brothers	March 23, 2012	September 3, 2013	
Charlie and Lola	March 23, 2012	May 16, 2014	
Timmy Time	March 23, 2012	May 16, 2014	
Babar and the Adventures of Badou	March 23, 2012	November 30, 2015	
Tinga Tinga Tales	March 23, 2012	September 3, 2013	
Octonauts	March 23, 2012	January 28, 2019	
3rd & Bird	March 23, 2012	May 16, 2014	
Gaspard and Lisa	March 23, 2012	May 16, 2014	
Guess How Much I Love You	March 23, 2012	May 16, 2014	
The Hive	October 8, 2012	May 16, 2014	
Ella the Elephant	February 17, 2014	March 14, 2016	
Kate & Mim-Mim	December 19, 2014	July 2, 2017	
P. King Duckling	November 7, 2016	December 1, 2017	
Gigantosaurus	January 18, 2019	November 14, 2022	
Pikwik Pack	November 7, 2020	August 14, 2021 (Note: The remaining episodes were released on Hulu on November 1, 2021.)	
Dino Ranch	January 18, 2021	May 27, 2025	
Kiya & the Kimoja Heroes	March 22, 2023	February 9, 2024	(Note: Also airs on Disney+)
Morphle and the Magic Pets	March 20, 2024	September 7, 2025	

=== Programming from Disney Channel / Toon Disney / Disney XD ===
Title	Premiere date	End date	Source(s)
The Little Mermaid	March 23, 2012	May 16, 2014	
Jungle Cubs	March 23, 2012	September 3, 2013	
101 Dalmatians: The Series	March 23, 2012	September 3, 2013	
Timon & Pumbaa	March 23, 2012	September 3, 2013	
Lilo & Stitch: The Series	March 23, 2012	September 3, 2013	
The 7D	February 9, 2015	April 3, 2015	

=== Programming from Playhouse Disney ===
Title	Premiere date	End date	Source(s)
Rolie Polie Olie	March 23, 2012	September 28, 2014	
Stanley	March 23, 2012	September 3, 2013	
JoJo's Circus	March 23, 2012	May 16, 2014	
Higglytown Heroes	March 23, 2012	May 16, 2014	
Little Einsteins	March 23, 2012	March 17, 2019	
Johnny and the Sprites	March 23, 2012	September 3, 2013	
PB&J Otter	September 4, 2012	May 16, 2014	
My Friends Tigger & Pooh	September 12, 2016	December 23, 2020	

=== Interstitial programming ===
==== Live-action ====
- A Poem Is
- Bunnytown shorts
- Choo Choo Soul
- Muppet Babies Play Date
- Muppet Moments
- Ooh, Aah & You
- Quiet Is...
- Special Agent Oso: Three Healthy Steps
- Where Is Warehouse Mouse?

==== Animated ====
- Aliens Love Underpants
- Big Block SingSong
- The Bite-Sized Adventures of Sam Sandwich
- Calling All T.O.T.S.
- Can You Teach My Alligator Manners?
- Cars Toons Mater's Tall Tales
- Chuggington: Badge Quest
- Dance-a-Lot Robot
- Dance with Mira
- Disney Junior Music: Lullabies
- Disney Junior Music: Nursery Rhymes
- Disney Junior Music: Ready for Preschool
- Disney Junior's Wonderful World of Songs
- DJ Melodies
- Doc Toy Hospital
- Doc McStuffins: The Doc & Bella Are In!
- The Doc Files
- Happy Monster Band
- Handy Manny's School for Tools
- It's UnBungalievable
- Jake's Buccaneer Blast
- Jake's Never Land Pirate School
- Lights, Camera, Lexi!
- Lou and Lou: Safety Patrol
- Mama Hook Knows Best!
- Marvel Super Hero Adventures
- Mickey Mouse
- Mission Force One: Connect and Protect
- Molang
- Muppet Babies: Show and Tell
- Nina Needs to Go!
- PJ Masks Music Videos
- PJ Masks Shorts
- Playing With Skully
- Rhythm & Rhymes
- Rise Up, Sing Out
- Shanna's Show
- Shane's Kindergarten Countdown
- Special Agent Oso: Three Healthy Steps
- Spookley Music Videos
- Sunny Bunnies
- Super Simple Songs
- Tasty Time with ZeFronk
- Toon Bops
- Toy Story Toons
- Whisker Haven Tales with the Palace Pets
- Yup Yups

== Programming blocks ==
=== Current ===
Title	Premiere date	Source(s)
The Magical World of Disney Junior	March 23, 2012	
Mickey Mornings	June 1, 2020	

=== Former ===
Title	Premiere date	End date	Source(s)
Disney Junior Night Light	September 4, 2012	March 23, 2017	

== See also ==
- List of programs broadcast by Disney Jr. (block)
- List of programs broadcast by Disney Channel
- List of programs broadcast by Disney XD
