= Strawberry Shortcake: Berry Blossom Festival =

- Starring: Sarah Heinke
- Production companies: DIC Entertainment; American Greetings
- Distributed by: Kidtoon Films (theatrical); 20th Century Fox Home Entertainment (DVD)
- Release date: March 13, 2007
- Running time: 44 minutes
- Country: United States
- Language: English

Strawberry Shortcake: Berry Blossom Festival is a 2007 American animated compilation film and was released on May 1 by 20th Century Fox Home Entertainment, although it was given an early release by Kidtoon Films on March 13 in select cinemas. Every copy of the DVD comes with a Berry Blossom Festival Crown, as seen in the film.

== Synopsis ==
Like with the other DVDs of Strawberry Shortcake, Berry Blossom Festival uses a "Compilation" format where Strawberry recalls the featured episodes in her "Remembering Book". The episodes featured on this DVD are "Mind Your Manners" and "Queen for a Day".

=== Mind Your Manners ===
Raspberry Torte does not care about manners at all, so her friends do what they can to show her that manners matter.

=== Queen for a Day ===
The Purple Pie Man fakes the answers in a quiz that pits Sour Grapes against Strawberry for the award of Berry Blossom Queen, which backfires on him at the last moment.

== Release ==
Berry Blossom Festival was released as part of Kidtoon Films' monthly program, during weekend matinees in select venues. The feature was only shown digitally, and not printed on traditional 35mm stock; had no major press reviews during its stay in theaters; and was designated as a direct-to-DVD feature in the first place. Hence, as with all of Kidtoon's past films, it is not considered a legitimate theatrical release, according to animation expert Jerry Beck on his Cartoon Research site.
