= Kidtoon Films =

U.S. film distributor

Kidtoon Films, Inc.
- Type: Subsidiary
- Industry: Film distribution, Children's entertainment
- Founded: 2005
- Defunct: 2016
- Products: Alternative content / weekend matinee screenings
- Parent: Principal Large Format Services (PLFS)

Kidtoon Films is a distributor of children's animated films in the United States. The company is a subsidiary of The Bigger Picture, itself owned by Cineverse, which acquired their founding parent company, SD Entertainment, in 2007, the latter of which produced many of its earlier releases. The company is based in Woodland Hills, Los Angeles.

Titles released under Kidtoon's program have an MPAA G rating, use Dolby Digital and/or DTS (and sometimes SDDS) tracks, and are shown digitally during weekend morning matinées at cinemas owned by National Amusements (Showcase Cinemas, Multiplex Cinemas, and Cinema de Lux), California's UltraStar, Carmike Cinemas, Rave Cinemas, B&B Theatres, Dipson Theatres, Emagine Entertainment, Studio Movie Grill and some smaller chains and independent cinemas.

Due to New Kideo acquiring Kidtoon Films in January 2013, the program took a 4-year hiatus. In February 2016, the program returned to 18 Showcase Cinemas locations with the film Barbie Spy Squad.

== History ==
Kidtoon Films launched on September 25, 2004, with Tonka Tough Truck Adventures: The Biggest Show on Wheels.

== September 2004 – December 2012 releases ==
- Tonka Tough Truck Adventures: The Biggest Show on Wheels (September 2004, March 2006)
- Spookley the Square Pumpkin (every October from 2004-2011)
- Candy Land: The Great Lollipop Adventure (February 2005, January 2008, August 2011)
- Little Nemo: Adventures in Slumberland (March 2005)
- The Golden Blaze (April 2005)
- Tom and Jerry: The Fast and the Furry (September 2005, June 2006)
- My Little Pony: A Very Minty Christmas (October 2005, November 2007)
- Scooby-Doo! in Where's My Mummy? (November 2005)
- Noddy Saves Christmas (December 2005)
- My Little Pony: The Princess Promenade (January 2006)
- Roach Approach: Slingshot Slugger (February 2006)
- Pinocchio 3000 (April 2006)
- The Secret of the Sword (May 2006)
- Arthur's Missing Pal (July 2006)
- My Little Pony: The Runaway Rainbow (August 2006)
- Holly Day (September 2006)
- Strawberry Shortcake: The Sweet Dreams Movie (October–November 2006)
- A Christmas Carol (December 2006)
- My Little Pony: A Very Pony Place (January 2007, August 2009)
- The Little Robots in the Big Show (February 2007)
- Strawberry Shortcake: Berry Blossom Festival (March 2007)
- Jakers!: Wish Upon a Story (April 2007)
- Eloise in Hollywood (May 2007)
- Holly Hobbie & Friends: Best Friends Forever (June 2007)
- Kidtoon Comics (July 2007)
- Care Bears: Oopsy Does It! (August 2007, June 2009)
- Strawberry Shortcake: Let's Dance (September–October 2007)
- The Santa Claus Brothers (December 2007)
- Care Bears: Grizzle-ly Adventures (February 2008)
- Easter In Bunnyland (March 2008)
- Bob the Builder: On Site - Roads and Bridges (April 2008)
- Sesame Street: Dinosaurs! (May 2008, July 2009)
- National Geographic Kids Big Screen Safari (June 2008)
- Thomas & Friends: The Great Discovery (July 2008, May–June 2009)
- Abby in Wonderland (September–October 2008)
- Barbie in a Christmas Carol (November 2008)
- Barney's Night Before Christmas: The Movie (December 2008)
- PBS Kids Goes To The Movies (January 2009)
- Bob the Builder: On Site - Skyscrapers (February 2009)
- Barbie Presents: Thumbelina (March 2009)
- Super Why! and WordWorld Celebrate Earth Day (April 2009)
- Thomas & Friends: Hero of the Rails (September 8, 2009, June 2011)
- Barney's Jungle Friends (October 2009)
- My Little Pony: Twinkle Wish Adventure (November 2009)
- Curious George: A Very Monkey Christmas/Olivia's Winter Wonderland (December 2009)
- Winter Day Dreams ft. Franny's Feet and Olivia (January 2010)
- Super Why! Attack of the Eraser (February 2010)
- Strawberry Shortcake: The Berryfest Princess Movie (March 2010)
- Care Bears: To the Rescue (April 2010)
- Barbie in A Mermaid Tale (May 2010)
- Dinosaur Train (June 2010)
- Sesame Workshop Summer Beach Party (July 2010)
- Strawberry Shortcake: The Glimmerberry Ball Movie (August 2010)
- Barbie: A Fashion Fairytale (September 2010)
- Care Bears: Share Bear Shines (November 2010)
- Curious George: A Very Monkey Christmas (December 2010)
- The Adventures of Chuck and Friends/My Little Pony: Friendship & Adventures (January 2011)
- Barbie: A Fairy Secret (February 2011)
- The Little Engine That Could (March 2011)
- The Strawberry Shortcake Movie: Sky's the Limit (April 2011)
- Olivia and the Great Outdoors (May–June 2011)
- Babar and the Adventures of Badou: Swing into Summer (July 2011)
- Sid the Science Kid (September 2011)
- Thomas & Friends: Day of the Diesels (November 2011)
- Olivia: Wintertime Cheer! (December 2011)
- Dino Dan (January 2012)
- Barbie in A Mermaid Tale 2 (February 2012)
- The Gruffalo (March 2012)
- Peppa Pig: Muddy Puddles and Other Stories (April 2012)
- Sid the Science Kid: Backyard Campout (May 2012)
- Strawberry Shortcake: Bloomin' Berry Garden (June 2012)
- The Sam Wiggles: Big Birthday (July 2012)
- Thomas & Friends: Blue Mountain Mystery (August 2012)
- The Gruffalo's Child (September 2012)
- Chuggington: Traintastic Adventure (October 2012)
- LazyTown: Welcome To LazyTown (November 2012)
- Barbie: The Princess and the Popstar (December 2012) Note: This was the last Kidtoon Films feature shown before the original program ended.

== 2016 (Showcase Cinemas) releases ==
- Barbie Spy Squad (February 2016)
- Strawberry Shortcake: Sweet Sunshine Adventures (March 2016)
- Blaze and the Monster Machines (April 2016)
- Shimmer and Shine (May 2016)
- My Little Pony: Equestria Girls (June 2016)
- Transformers: Rescue Bots: Dinobots! (July 2016)
- Maya the Bee (August 2016)
- Blinky Bill: The Movie (September 2016)
- Care Bears: Mystery in Care-A-Lot (October 2016)
- Barbie & Her Sisters in A Puppy Chase (November–December 2016)
- Thomas & Friends: The Great Race (November–December 2016)

== Cancelled & rejected releases ==
During the 2016 revival of the program at Showcase Cinemas, several films that were meant to be shown as part of the program were cancelled and changed.

- Octonauts (May 2016, cancelled for unknown reasons, and was replaced by Shimmer and Shine)
- Dora and Friends: Into the City (June 2016, cancelled for unknown reasons and was replaced by My Little Pony: Equestria Girls)
- Zack and Quack (July 2016, cancelled for unknown reasons, and was replaced by Transformers Rescue Bots: Dinobots!)
- Barbie Starlight Adventure (August 2016, cancelled due to the Fathom Events release of the film, and was replaced by Maya the Bee: The Movie)
- Babar (September 2016, cancelled for unknown reasons and was replaced by Blinky Bill: The Movie)
- The Boxcar Children (November 2016, cancelled because Kidtoon partnered with Mattel to show Barbie & Her Sisters in A Puppy Chase)
- The Snowman (December 2016, likely canceled because Kidtoon showed two films in November)

In addition, Kidtoons took a hiatus between December 2016 and February 2017. The films were released to Fathom Events.
