= The Hive (TV series) =

Animated children's television series

- Genre: Educational; Preschool; Adventure
- Created by: David Willing
- Directed by: Ray Merritt
- Composers: Ben Lee-Delisle; Paul Kissaun
- Countries of origin: India; United Kingdom

Production
- Executive producers: Tapaas Chakravarti; Steve O'Pray; Vishal Dudeja (series 1); Ruth Fielding (series 1)
- Producers: David Willing; Camilia Deakin (series 2); Ruth Fielding (series 2)
- Production companies: The Hive Enterprises; DQ Entertainment; Lupus Films; Monumental Productions; Bejuba! Entertainment

Original release
- Network: CITV; Disney Junior
- Release: 10 September 2010 – 4 October 2016

The Hive is an 3D animated children's television series that premiered on the CITV channel since 10 September 2010, and later aired on Disney Junior from 3 April 2011 to 4 October 2016. The series was produced by The Hive Enterprises Limited in co-production with DQ Entertainment, and distributed by Bejuba! Entertainment.

== Premise and format ==
The Hive features the Bee Family and explores everyday things concerning small children (such as playing, being friendly, spending time with your family, getting along, finding out all about the world and how it works, etc.).

== Characters ==
- Buzzbee is a 5-year-old bee. He is helpful and inquisitive. Rubee calls him an "annoying little brother".
- Rubee is a 7-year-old bee. She is the eldest child of Mama Bee and Papa Bee, older daughter and sister to Buzzbee and Babee. Buzzbee calls her a "bossy big sister". Rubee is a computer wizz.
- Babee is Buzzbee and Rubee's baby sister. She loves to giggle and play with her sister and brother.
- Mamma Bee is the mother of Buzzbee, Rubee and Babee and the wife of Pappa Bee. She often bakes cakes and other food.
- Pappa Bee is the father of Buzzbee, Rubee and Babee and the husband of Mamma Bee. He often sits on the sofa reading his newspaper.
- Grandma Bee is the grandmother of Buzzbee, Rubee and Babee and the wife of Grandpa Bee. She looks after Rubee, Buzzbee and Babee when Mamma Bee isn't at home. Unknown if she has mothered Momma Bee or Pappa Bee.
- Grandpa Bee is the grandfather of Buzzbee, Rubee and Babee and the husband of Grandma Bee. He often gives Buzzbee a treat and tells him a story. Like Grandma Bee, it's unknown if he has fathered Mamma Bee or Pappa Bee.
- Jump is Grandma and Grandpa Bee's pet flea. He is very energetic and loves to jump around a lot.
- Jasper is a mischievous wasp who often plays tricks on his friends. He is one of Buzzbee's best friends and sometimes sarcastic and calls Barnabee a slowworm.
- Barnabee is a loyal and truthful bee who is another one of Buzzbee's best friends. He wears glasses.
- Debee is Rubee's best friend. She has freckles and brown pigtails.
- Miss Ladybird is Buzzbee's teacher from Honeydew School.
- Postman Spider is a postman who is a good friend of Buzzbee.
- Katypillar is a caterpillar who looks after and plants flowers.
- Mr Millipede is a millipede who is a mechanic.
- Doctor Beetle is a beetle who is a doctor.
- Millice and Vince are two ants who work in the Anthill Store.
- Lord Bartlebee Buzz is a lord who is briefly snobbish but kind. He is the Queen's personal servant.
- Queen Bee is a queen bee who is Lord Bartlebee's love interest. She is good friends with Buzzbee.
- Mrs Wasp is Jasper's Mum. She is good friends with Buzzbee's Mum.
- Snail is a snail and a student from Honeydew School. He hides in his shell when he gets scared.
- Spider is a spider and a student from Honeydew School. He may be Postman Spider's son.
- Worm is a silent and really annoying worm who appears in every episode (some episodes feature Worm with an mouth) and in the ending credits.
- Birds: The two blue birds that appear in every episode on a nearby tree. The male's name is Feathers while the female's name is Fluff
- Clara Bee is the cleaner of Honeydew School. Unseen but mentioned only by Miss Ladybird in episode "Have You Heard?"
- Worker Bees are three bees who keep collecting pollen grains from the Flower Field.
- Herbee is a four-year-old bee. He is Barnabee's little brother.
- Mrs. Butterfly is Katypillar's mother.

== Episodes ==
=== Pilot (2008) ===
Title	Original release date
"Busy as a Bee"	30 November 2008
Buzzbee tries to show his new trick, which he calls a "Super Whee Spinner" to his family, but they're busy with other stuff, so he goes to play with someone else.

=== Season 1 (2010–12) ===
No.	Title	Original release date
1	"Postman Buzzbee"	10 September 2010
Buzzbee takes over the role of Honey Farm's postman for a day after Postman Spider has hurt his ankle and needs a lie down.
2	"A Royal Visit"	17 September 2010
The whole school is in excitement over the royal visit. Rubee is chosen to present the Queen Bee with flowers and Buzzbee is a little jealous.
3	"Babee's Room"	24 September 2010
Rubee and Buzzbee are excited about the new arrival of their little sister Babee, but they argue over whose room Babee should share.
4	"Buzzbee the Magician"	1 October 2010
Buzzee is inspired by Pappa Bee's magic show to practice his skills as a magician, but then he was cross with Rubee when she spoils one of his tricks.
5	"Scaredy Bee"	8 October 2010
Buzzbee and Barnabee are camping out in the meadow, but Barnabee is a little frightened.
6	"Buzzbee to the Rescue"	15 October 2010
Buzzbee is learning to tie a bandage from Doctor Beetle, but when Vincent hurts his foot, Buzzbee and Jasper fight over which way they should wrap the bandage.
7	"Computer Bee"	22 October 2010
Buzzbee wants to learn to email on the computer just like Rubee, but he accidentally orders too many eggs for Mamma Bee.
8	"Sporty Bee"	29 October 2010
Barnabee teaches Buzzbee how to win in an egg-and-spoon race, but when Buzzbee is ill on Sports Day, Barnabee must take over for him.
9	"Birthday Bee"	5 November 2010
It is Pappa Bee's birthday and Buzzbee and Mamma Bee bake a cake for him, but when Rubee shows them her cake, they are the ones who are surprised.
10	"Buzzbee's Teddy Bee"	12 November 2010
Jasper and Rubee tease Buzzbee about having a teddy bee, which makes Buzzbee sad. When Rubee feels guilty about it, she must make up for it.
11	"Buzzbee's Garden"	19 November 2010
Buzzbee gets advice from Katypillar of how to plant flower seeds, but Buzzbee worries that he has done it wrong.
12	"Have You Heard?"	26 November 2010
When Buzzbee, Jasper and Barnabee think Miss Ladybird is leaving, they decide to hold a goodbye party. But then they finally hear that Miss Ladybird is not leaving at all. It is Clara Bee, the school cleaner who is leaving.
13	"Buzzbee's Lullaby"	3 December 2010
It is raining and Buzzbee wants to play, but when he upsets Babee for waking her up, he helps her get to sleep with a gentle lullaby creation.
14	"Loyal Bee"	10 December 2010
Rubee is embarrassed because the students laugh at her solo. When Buzzbee cheers her up, he convinces her that she is brilliant.
15	"A Windy Day!"	17 December 2010
It is windy, so Buzzbee and Rubee play a game of tag. But when they've been blown towards the Spooky Woods, Grandma and Grandpa Bee rescue them.
16	"Imaginary Bee"	24 December 2010
When Buzzbee and Rubee play a staring competition, Barnabee feels left out. He makes an imaginary friend named Robbee, but Buzzbee tries to convince him that he isn't real.
17	"Bee in Charge"	31 December 2010
When Miss Ladybird makes Buzzbee 'Very Special Classroom Monitor', Buzzbee thinks to himself that he is a great choice but won't let anyone borrow the games!
18	"A Bee's Best Friend"	7 January 2011
Iffy Buzzbee and Jasper trick the girls into keeping away from Grandma Bee's pet flea Jump, they squabble over him.
19	"Healthy Bee"	14 January 2011
Buzzbee is not keen on bananas, but when he dumps them behind the radiator, Miss Ladybird convinces him to try a banana sandwich.
20	"Buzzbee Cleans Up"	21 January 2011
When Buzzbee and Barnabee clean up the playground, they want to tell everyone to keep Honey Farm tidy.
21	"Sleepy Bee"	28 January 2011
Jasper tricks Buzzbee into staying up all night, which makes Buzzbee very tired.
22	"Jump Goes to School"	4 February 2011
When Buzzbee and Rubee bring Jump to school, they accidentally lose him during Miss Ladybird's lesson.
23	"Scooter Bee"	11 February 2011
When Debbie teaches Buzzbee to ride on her new scooter, Buzzbee is told to watch it while she and Rubee get pollen stoppers but accidentally breaks it.
24	"A Droopy Antenna"	18 February 2011
Buzzbee tricks Mamma Bee into thinking he has a droopy antenna but realises that he has been faking it.
25	"Dancing Bee"	25 February 2011
Buzzbee is disappointed when Rubee and Debbie throw him out of their dance routine, so Postman Spider tells him that everyone dances differently.
26	"Buzzbee Helps Out"	4 March 2011
When Buzzbee and Jasper are told to watch Anthill Store, they play, make a big mess and even eat too many pollen stoppers!
27	"Being Mamma Bee"	11 March 2011
Mamma Bee is not feeling well, so Buzzbee and Rubee take over her jobs. When they forget the instructions of their jobs, they cause a big mess!
28	"Useful Bee"	18 March 2011
Buzzbee and Barnabee attempt to help Mr Millipede out at his garage. But when they mess things up, he is not happy!
29	"Babee's First Word"	25 March 2011
Buzzbee and Rubee attempt to get Babee to say her first word. At the end of the episode Babee says her first word: "Night-night".
30	"Buzzbee's Babysitter"	1 April 2011
Buzzbee is disappointed that Katypillar is babysitting him instead of Grandma Bee, but when they are making pizza, they end up having fun.
31	"Teddy Bee Lost"	8 April 2011
When Buzzbee shops with Mamma Bee at Anthill Store, he accidentally leaves Teddy Bee there!
32	"Musical Bees"	15 April 2011
When Buzzbee and Rubee fight over their turns with their xylophone, they accidentally break it. Pappa Bee fixes it and tells them to play it together.
33	"Bee On Time"	22 April 2011
When Buzzbee is late for his football practise, Pappa Bee sets his alarm clock for the next day. It turns out that Buzzbee has set it early!
34	"Giggly Bee"	29 April 2011
Debbie has the giggles, so Rubee, Buzzbee and the gang must cure them before the Queen Bee arrives.
35	"How to be Friends"	6 May 2011
Rubee won't let Buzzbee play tennis with her and Debbie, which causes the girls to have a quarrel. When Buzzbee won't let Rubee play tennis with him and Barnabee, they must help the girls make up.
36	"Buzzbee Digs for Treasure"	7 May 2011
When Buzzbee and Barnabee borrow Postman Spider's metal detector, they only find a pile of metal junk, until they help Millis and Vince find their key.
37	"Brave Bee"	8 May 2011
Buzzbee is worried about having a check-up, even when Pappa Bee tells him that if there's anything wrong with them, the doctor takes them away in his bag.
38	"Buzzbee's Mystery Photo"	9 May 2011
Buzzbee and Barnabee find an old photo in Honeydew School and attempt to find out who it is, then finally realise it is Grandpa Bee!
39	"Buzzbee Makes a Swap"	8 May 2011
When Buzzbee and Jasper swap toys for the day, they realise how important their toys are to them, apart from Rubee and Debbie, who have swapped lunchboxes.
40	"The Other Buzzbee"	10 May 2011
When Buzzbee realises he has two jobs to do, he forces Barnabee to pretend to be the other Buzzbee for Postman Spider's delivery job.
41	"Buzzbee's Big Film"	11 May 2011
Buzzbee is making a film called "An Ordinary Day On Honey Farm", but along the way, the scenes are filled with chaos!
42	"Once Upon a Buzzbee"	12 May 2011
Rubee and Buzzbee want to know what happens next in Pappa Bee's story "Piraticus Tat-Taticus", but they have wait until Pappa Bee comes home.
43	"Buzzbee's Den"	13 May 2011
When Buzzbee refuses to tidy his room, he decides to make his own den, which is very untidy.
44	"Bees in Space"	14 May 2011
Buzzbee wins two tickets to the "Space Bees" movie, but gets in a mix-up when Jasper and Barnabee attempt to come with him.
45	"Don't Be Greedy"	15 May 2011
Buzzbee eats Rubee's lunch during a school trip, which gives him a tummy-ache.
46	"Organised Bee"	16 May 2011
Buzzbee and Barnabee are told to deliver treats to everyone, but get them and their rhyme mixed-up.
47	"It's Not Easy Being Green"	17 May 2011
When Buzzbee accidentally spills green paint on the grass, he is told to clean it up. But then he discovers green footprints on the grass, then realises they are his footprints!
48	"Mother's Day"	12 October 2011
Buzzbee attempts Mamma Bee three things for Mother's Day, but has the things all wrong.
49	"Funny Bee"	19 October 2011
Buzzbee, Barnabee and Jasper show Lord Bartleby how to have fun while the Queen Bee is at the Flower Fields.
50	"Pappa Gets Fit"	26 October 2011
Rubee and Buzzbee teach Pappa Bee how to get fit, but end up helping their friends with their problems.
51	"Buzzbee Buzzes Off"	2 November 2011
Rubee bosses Buzzbee about during a game of rounders, which makes Buzzbee leave the game. But when he spills Mamma Bee's papers, he and Rubee must work together.
52	"Silly Bee"	9 November 2011
When the boys play a tickling game, it gives Jasper an idea to tickle Buzzbee at school, which causes a lot of trouble for Buzzbee.
53	"Show and Tell Bee"	16 November 2011
Buzzbee is trying to choose what to take to school for show-and-tell, so Grandpa Bee gives him an idea.
54	"Winning Isn't Everything"	23 November 2011
Buzzbee attempts to break one of Grandpa Bee's records: doing 20 loops in 20 seconds. When he does it on Record Day, he must help Grandpa Bee after he hurts his wing.
55	"Treasure Hunt"	30 November 2011
Buzzbee buzzes off from Barnabee and Jasper during a school treasure hunt, but he keeps going in the wrong places.
56	"Squeaky Bee"	2 February 2012
Buzzbee and Jasper play a joke on everyone with Jump's new squeaky bone, until they try to convince the Queen Bee not to sit down because it's under the couch cushion.
57	"Buzzbee's Secrets"	9 February 2012
Buzzbee has three special secrets to keep, but he accidentally gives them away, even on the day of Jasper's birthday.
58	"Lord Bartlebee and the Teddy Bee"	16 February 2012
When Debbie accidentally sells Buzzbee's Teddy Bee to Lord Bartleby Buzz, Buzzbee and the girls team up to get him back.
59	"Miss Ladybird's Day Off"	23 February 2012
Buzzbee and Barnabee are disappointed that Miss Ladybird is leaving, so they try to stop her from going.
60	"Rainy Day Fun"	2 March 2012
Buzzbee and Barnabee accidentally make the sign dirty, which causes the Queen Bee's car to be stuck in a puddle.
61	"Do the Sticky Stomp"	14 March 2012
Vincent wants to surprise Millisant for when she comes back to the store, so Buzzbee and the gang create a dance for her.
62	"Collector Bee"	27 April 2012
Buzzbee wants a collection like Rubee, so Barnabee helps him collect strawberries.
63	"Polite Bee"	4 May 2012
Everyone thinks Buzzbee is rude because he is excited, so Lord Bartleby shows him how to be more polite.
64	"Rain Dance"	11 May 2012
Katypillar is worried about the flowers because it hasn't rained in a long time, so Buzzbee, Rubee and the gang do a rain dance.
65	"Buzzbee's Holiday"	18 May 2012
Buzzbee is sad about Grandpa Bee not coming with the family to the seaside, but then Buzzbee advises that they would have their holiday by the river.
66	"Babee's First Christmas"	8 June 2012
Buzzbee is jealous because everyone is making a big fuss about Babee's first Christmas. But when he accidentally loses Babee's present, Rubee helps him find it.
67	"Spring Bee"	15 June 2012
When Jasper shakes the petals off the spring flower on purpose, Katypillar thinks it is unhappy. But on the first day of spring, a new flower grows in its place.
68	"The Night Before Christmas"	22 June 2012
Buzzbee and Rubee attempt to find Pappa Christmas on Christmas Midnight, but when they wake Jump up, he knocks over the Christmas tree.
69	"Buzzbee and the Snow Bee"	29 June 2012
Buzzbee and his friends build a snow bee named "Snowy", Buzzbee is sad because he has melted but then learns that every day is a fun day even when it isn't winter.
70	"Festival of Lights"	26 September 2012
When Buzzbee thinks Jasper is naughty and doesn't work hard, the others tell him to help get ready for the Festival of Lights to prove it.
71	"Jasper's Monster"	10 October 2012
Jasper makes up the "Slimy Toad Forest Monster" in the Spooky Woods to scare Barnabee, so when the girls make up the "Honey-Munching Sea Monster" to scare Jasper, he flies off to find his mum.
72	"Lord Bartlebee and the Thunderstorm"	17 October 2012
Jasper is afraid of thunderstorms, so Lord Bartleby helps him overcome his fear of them.
73	"Peek-a-Bee"	14 November 2012
When Buzzbee, Barnabee and Jasper get told off for spying on people, they apologize to Mr Millipede and convince him that he's great at tap-dancing.
74	"Buzzbee's New Ball"	21 November 2012
Buzzbee wants a new football after his old one broke, but it keeps coming back to him and breaking.
75	"Lonely Bee"	28 November 2012
Barnabee feels disappointed because he has been left out from the picnic, apart from a map that Jasper made and blew away.
76	"Buzzbee's Goodbye"	21 November 2012
Buzzbee is very upset about Millis and Vince leaving the store so Buzzbee and his friends organise a special goodbye for them.
77	"Babee's Busy Day"	28 November 2012
When Buzzbee, Barnabee and Jasper look after Babee for the day, they cause so many accidents and blame it all on Babee.
78	"Grandma Bee Learns to Drive"	12 December 2012
Grandma Bee is worried about her first driving lesson so Buzzbee encourages her to try it from heart.

== Production ==
The series was announced in September 2006 during Cartoon Forum and MIPCOM, when London-based animation studio Lupus Films and creative production agency Picture Production Company (the two previously partnered on The Pinky and Perky Show) partnered with Monumental Productions to produce a new CGI-animated preschool series that focuses on the bee family.

In March 2009, Lupus Films announced that Canadian distribution company Bejuba! Entertainment secured worldwide distribution rights to the upcoming series The Hive and joined the series as co-producer. On 29 March 2010, Indian animation studio DQ Entertainment (whom Lupus Films & Picture Production Company previously co-produced The Pinky & Perky Show with the Indian studio) joined the series as co-producer and would handle animation production services for the series. In June 2013 it was reported that The Joester Loria Group had signed deals to produce merchandise for the series. In 2015, Disney Junior EMEA commissioned a second season of the series.

=== Broadcast ===
In April of 2010, Disney EMEA acquired worldwide broadcasting rights to the series and would broadcast the series on its Playhouse Disney channels internationally the following year in early 2011. In September 2015, it was announced that episodes would begin airing on Clan in Spain.

The show also aired on Disney Jr. in the United States from 2012 to 2016 and was available for streaming on Netflix until 2017 and was available on Hulu but removed at an unknown date. Cineverse (formerly Cinedigm ) distributed American rights for the series and released a few DVDs for the series

As of Today, The show can be streamed on Tubi and other streaming platforms.

== Home releases ==
Playtime in Honeybee Hive

- Postman Buzzbee
- Computer Bee
- Buzzbee the Magician
- Babee's Room
- Scaredy Bee
- Birthday Bee
- Sporty Bee
- A Royal Visit

Visiting the Doctor With Buzzbee

- Buzzbee to the Rescue
- Healthy Bee
- Being Mamma Bee
- Sleepy Bee
- A Droopy Antenna
- Brave Bee
- Don't Be Greedy
- Pappa Gets Fit

Let's Get Green

- Buzzbee's Garden
- Buzzbee Cleans Up

Buzzbee big holiday

- A Windy Day
- Buzzbee Helps Out
- Useful Bee
- Buzzbee's Den
- Rainy Day Fun
- It's Not Easy Being Green

Dance Party!

- Dancing Bee
- Musical Bees
- Do The Sticky Stomp
- Loyal Bee
- Spring Bee
- Peek-a-Bee
- Funny Bee
- Rain Dance

American DVD releases were by Cineverse

Buzzbee’s Family Adventures (episode titles needed, if added, message can be deleted)

Party in Honeybee Hive (read first message)

A Very Buzzbee Christmas (read first message)
