= Out of the Box (TV series) =

US television program

- Genre: Children's television series
- Created by: Douglas Love; Ellen Goosenberg Kent
- Starring: Tony James; Vivian Bayubay McLaughlin
- Music by: Bobby Golden
- Opening theme: "Out of the Box Theme" by Peter Lurye
- Ending theme: "Until We Meet Again (Goodbye Song)" by Billy Straus "Out of the Box Theme" (instrumental)
- Composer: Sean Altman
- Country of origin: United States
- Original language: English
- No. of seasons: 3
- No. of episodes: 82

Production
- Executive producer: Douglas Love
- Running time: 22–24 minutes

Original release
- Network: Playhouse Disney
- Release: October 7, 1998 – December 6, 2000

Out of the Box is an American children's television series which premiered on Playhouse Disney on October 7, 1998, and ended its run on December 6, 2000, with reruns until June 2006 (December 2006 in the UK). The series takes place in "The Box", a playhouse made entirely of cardboard boxes, where two hosts, Tony James and Vivian Bayubay McLaughlin, make crafts, sing songs, and act out plays.

Two special episodes were released on VHS by Walt Disney Home Video, Out of the Box: Trick or Treat, and Out of the Box: Happy Holidays. Trick or Treat is also available on the DVD entitled Rolie Polie Olie: A Spookie Ookie Halloween.

The series was created and executive produced by Douglas Love and was based on his series of books from HarperCollins. Three seasons were filmed at Lifetime Studios in New York City. Production ended in 2000, with the final episodes being broadcast in December of that year. The series earned three Parents' Choice Awards for excellence in television and an Emmy nomination.

== Overview ==
Every day, Tony and Vivian take care of a small group of neighborhood children. They come and play in "The Box", a clubhouse made entirely out of cardboard boxes. They do crafts, sing songs, and act out stories revolved around the episode's theme. At the end of the day, either Tony or Vivian walks the kids home while the other recaps the day's events. Every episode ends with Tony and Vivian singing their Goodbye Song. The song is either sung a cappella by Vivian and with Tony tapping on a pumpkin or some other object, but in three episodes Tony plays it on his guitar. In two episodes, the kids join in on the Goodbye Song; after they finish, they wave to the viewers and the camera moves out as a piano ending of the Goodbye Song plays. In one episode, Vivian tells the viewers that she will tell Tony they are thinking of him.

== Cast ==
- Tony James as himself
- Vivian Bayubay McLaughlin as herself
- Brandon Zemel as Brandon (season 1)
- Jill Schackner as Jill (season 1)
- Matthew Storff as Matt (season 1)
- Dane Hammond as Dane (seasons 1–2)
- Aleisha Allen as Aleisha (seasons 1–3)
- Nicholas Eng as Nicholas (seasons 1–3)
- Cecelia Cortes as Cece (season 1)
- Celine Marget-Ordioni as Celine (season 2)
- Spiridoula Cardona as Spiri (season 2)
- Michael Mylett as Michael (season 2)
- Tyler Lee as Tyler (season 2)
- Christopher Jordan as Christopher (season 2)
- Lindsey Pickering as Lindsey (season 2)
- Elijah Rivera as Elijah (season 3)
- Andrea Rosario as Andrea (season 3)
- Madeleine Martin as Madeleine (season 3)
- Bradley Duck as Brad (season 3)
- Zachary Ross as Zachary (season 3)
- Andrew Feinberg as Andrew (season 3)

== Episodes ==
=== Series overview ===
Season	Segments	Episodes	Originally released	
Season	Segments	Episodes	First released	Last released
1	52	24	October 7, 1998	November 9, 1998
2	22	32	July 18, 1999	January 11, 2000
3	10	26	November 1, 2000	December 6, 2000

The series comprises 82 episodes in total.

Unless otherwise stated, the source of production codes and airdates is the United States Copyright Office.

=== Season 1 (1998) ===
No. overall	No. in season	Title	Original release date	Prod. code
1	1	"Feet First"	October 7, 1998	101
Tony plays his talking drum and everyone moves their feet to the beat. The children also make paintings with their feet and act out their own version of Cinderella.
2	2	"Playhouse Mouse"	October 8, 1998	102
Vivian brings in her new pet mouse, Nugget, to meet everyone. When Jill loses Nugget in the clubhouse, everyone works together to find her. Their efforts include asking a cat for advice, building a "Mouse House," and even singing to lure out Nugget. They also act out the story of The Lion and the Mouse.
3	3	"Doctor Octor"	October 9, 1998	103
Brandon just came back from a check-up, this has everyone share their experiences getting check-ups and pretend to be doctors. The kids pretend to have "sticker-itis," visit a doctor in a painting, and build a pretend ambulance. Swampy the Alligator suddenly becomes sick and everyone pitches in to help out.
4	4	"The Fuzzy Worm"	October 12, 1998	104
Jill finds a real live caterpillar and brings it in to show Tony. The children make pretend butterflies and learn about cocoons. They also act out the story of The Fuzzy Worm; a variation of The Ugly Duckling.
5	5	"Hats Off"	October 13, 1998	105
On a rainy day, the kids learn of how hats have many different uses. They visit two baseball players in a painting, build their own hats, and act out the story of Chicken Little.
6	6	"Let's Eat Out"	October 14, 1998	106
An early version of the season two episode "We're Cooking". Not aired since 1999 and not available for streaming on Disney+.
7	7	"Sticky Icky"	October 15, 1998	107
Vivian is in the middle of painting a chair when the kids run in almost getting their hand sticky from the wet paint. While Vivian and the kids have fun making a sticky paper picture, Tony comes in and gets stuck on Vivian's chair. After helping to free Tony, they sing songs about stickiness, make sticky capes, and go on a sticky safari.
8	8	"Really Wheely"	October 16, 1998	108
Dane finds an old wagon that's missing a wheel. Everyone helps Dane look for a wheel to fix his wagon. After fixing it, the kids decorate it and go rescue Pogo the Porcupine.
9	9	"Yes and Nose"	October 19, 1998	109
Tony brings in some fresh-baked muffins and hides them to cool off. The kids find the muffins using their noses and must figure out what kind of muffins Tony baked. They learn about noises their noses can make, they also make animal noses out of paper cups and use them to act out a version of "Pinocchio."
10	10	"Pick-a-Pet"	October 20, 1998	110
Nicholas brings in a toy pet he named Skippy and has to practice taking care of a pet before he is allowed to have a pet of his choice. Everyone offers suggestions of different pets you can have. They sing about having any pet they can imagine, make animal props, and even have Vivian pretend to be a "Kitty Parrot Bunny Dog." They also act out their own version of The Billy Goats Gruff.
11	11	"Ships Ahoy"	October 21, 1998	111
Inspired by Tony's bottle blowing and Dane's snow globe from Jamaica, the kids are curious about things that sink and float. They make cork ships, visit a pirate and learn about ships and water safety, and pretend to be pirates and act out a story where they come across Captain Hook.
12	12	"Animal Antics"	October 22, 1998	112
The kids learn about different animals.
13	13	"Tube Town"	October 23, 1998	113
After a shelf full of cardboard tubes falls, everyone has fun thinking of things that can be made of tubes. They make tube instruments, tube shaped costumes, and pretend to live in a town made of tubes.
14	14	"High Fliers"	October 26, 1998	114
Jill's glider crashes into the clubhouse, so Vivian helps her fix it. While waiting for the glue to dry, everyone pretends they can fly, make paper parachutes, and act out a story about Peter Pan.
15	15	"Campout Kids"	October 27, 1998	115
Tony and Vivian takes the kids on a pretend campout. They go on a hike, run into poison ivy, go fishing, and tell the story of Little Red Riding Hood's birthday. Note: This was the first of three episodes to have the Goodbye Song played on the guitar. The others were "Sing a Song" and "It's Mothers Day".
16	16	"Tall and Small"	October 28, 1998	116
Dane brings in a toy car, so Vivian and the kids make a tiny town for Dane's car. The kids pretend to be giants and to be tiny. They also learn about different sizes and how each size is perfect, and act out a version of Goldilocks and the Three Bears.
17	17	"Day at the Beach"	October 29, 1998	117
Tony is playing with his ocean drum which inspires them to have a pretend beach day. They make a pretend beach, make ocean drums, visit a crab and octopus, and play out a story about an octopus, crab, and a fisherman.
18	18	"A Place Called Space"	October 30, 1998	118
While admiring Vivian's space mobile, the kids are inspired to learn about space. They pretend to go into space, make space mobiles, and tell the story of Why the Sun and Moon Live in the Sky.
19	19	"Box Full of Boxes"	November 2, 1998	119
Finding leftover boxes from when they built the clubhouse, the kids learn of the many different things that can be done with boxes. Along with making a gingerbread house, they act out a version of Hansel and Gretel.
20	20	"Hands On"	November 3, 1998	120
While making hand binoculars, Aleisha shows everyone sign language. The kids also learn of other gestures and noises that can be done with just their hands. They also make paper mittens and act out the story of The Three Little Kittens.
21	21	"The Gift"	November 4, 1998	121
Tony, Aleisha, Brandon and Cece spend a day at the clubhouse without Vivian, who is busy taking her mother to a doctor's appointment and is unable to come. They reminisce about past times and make a present for Viv to give to her mom. Viv arrives in time to take the kids home but lets them visit her mom and give her the present, while Tony stays behind to give the closing message to the viewers and sing the goodbye song. This episode is partially an early version of the season two episode "Revealing Feelings", and for this reason was never rerun after season two premiered. Not available for streaming on Disney+. Note: This is the only episode in which Vivian is absent.
22	22	"Treasures"	November 5, 1998	122
An early version of the season two episode "Treasure Hunt". Not aired since 1999 and not available for streaming on Disney+.
23	23	"Circle Circus"	November 6, 1998	123
While playing with hula hoops, Aleisha admits the she doesn't know how to. To encourage her, they visit a circus lion and sing her an encouraging song. This leads them to making circle themed costumes and put on their own Circle Circus starring Humpty Dumpty.
24	24	"Seeds of Imagination"	November 9, 1998	124
Vivian shows off the bean plants she grew from a week before. Tony and Vivian then teach the kids about seeds; how they grow, what they need to grow, and where they come from. They make newspaper trees and use them to act out the story of Matt and The Beanstalk.

=== Season 2 (1999–2000) ===
No. overall	No. in season	Title	Original release date	Prod. code
25	1	"Zip, Button, Snap"	July 18, 1999	201
Tony and Vivian help teach the children how to button, snap, buckle and zipper using songs and play-acting. Nick also visits Queen Elisabeth I and they play their own version The Emperors New Clothes.
26	2	"Rules Rule!"	July 20, 1999	202
After a hammock of a variety of balls falls, everyone pitches in to help put them away. While cleaning, Nicholas, Celine, and Aleisha are tempted to play with the balls inside the clubhouse. However, they realized that most ball games are for outside instead of inside. The trio come up with a game called Rolly Moo, learn the importance of having rules for games, rules for outdoor & indoor ball games, and act out a version of Cinderella explaining the origins of Rolly Moo.
27	3	"We're Cooking!"	July 21, 1999	203
The children pretend to cook their favorite foods. They also act out a version of the story Stone Soup.
28	4	"Scrub-a-Dub"	July 22, 1999	204
Tony and Vivian teach the importance of bathing as the children make pretend bathtubs and bath toys, and act out a version of Rub a Dub, Dub, Three Men in a Tub.
29	5	"Disguise Surprise"	July 23, 1999	205
The children dress up in disguises and act out a version of The Little Red Riding Hood.
30	6	"Good Clean-Up Fun"	July 26, 1999	206
The children learn about sorting and organizing items while cleaning up the clubhouse. They also act out a story called "Neat Nick".
31	7	"Mirror, Mirror"	July 27, 1999	207
The children play with different kinds of mirrors, including a hand mirror, a hubcap and a metal tray. They also act out a version of Snow White and the Seven Dwarfs.
32	8	"Blowin' in the Wind"	July 28, 1999	208
The children celebrate the wind by playing wind instruments, listening to wind chimes, making pinwheels and playing out a version of The Three Little Pigs.
33	9	"Rock-a-Bye Baby"	July 29, 1999	209
The children take care of pretend babies by diapering them, making their cribs and singing to them. They also act out a version of There was an Old Lady Who Lived in a Shoe.
34	10	"Feathered Friends"	July 30, 1999	210
The children craft paper birds and make bird sounds after Vivian brings in a bird feeder to hang outside the playhouse. They also act out a version of the Emperor and the Nightingale.
35	11	"Eye Spy"	August 16, 1999	211
The children explore how their eyes work by playing an "Eye Detective" game, visiting Giuseppe Arcimboldo, looking at a picture with hidden objects, and helping Vivian complete a jigsaw puzzle. They also act out a version of The Tortoise and the Hare.
36	12	"We Got the Beat"	August 23, 1999	212
The children learn about sounds and music by listening to a metronome, making their own instruments, and acting out a version of Hansel and Gretel.
37	13	"Shadow Play"	August 30, 1999	213
The children make a shadow puppet theater and put on a play featuring a bird, a worm, and a spider.
38	14	"Goin' Buggy"	September 6, 1999	214
The children learn about bugs by making a grasshopper, a spider, and an ant out of pipe cleaners and egg cartons. They also act out a version of The Ants and the Grasshopper.
39	15	"Make 'Em Laugh!"	September 13, 1999	215
The children have a "Make 'em Laugh" day by telling jokes, walking funny and doing other silly things. They also talk with a court jester and turn Vivian into a backwards person.
40	16	"Mon-stir It Up!"	September 20, 1999	216
The children sing a song about not being afraid and make a "Super Monster" puppet.
41	17	"Whose Home?"	September 27, 1999	217
Vivian brings a hermit crab to the clubhouse and teaches the children about different animal homes.
42	18	"Unicornucopia"	October 6, 1999	218
Vivian brings over a gift she made to give to Tony's mom. While everyone is playing, Nicholas and Celine accidentally break Vivian's gift and decide to hide the truth. They create magical creatures out of clay and use them to act out a version of The Boy Who Cried Wolf.
43	19	"Tooth or Consequences"	October 11, 1999	219
The children learn about the dentist and caring for teeth. They also act out a version of Little Red Riding Hood.
44	20	"Trick or Treat"	October 21, 1999	220
The children dress up and learn the importance of how to trick-or-treat safely and how to customize their own pumpkins.
45	21	"Treasure Hunt"	October 26, 1999	221
The children make treasure chests and go on a treasure hunt. They also act out a version of King Midas to learn about nonmaterial kinds of treasure.
46	22	"Out to Lunch"	November 1, 1999	222
Vivian tells everyone about the restaurant she went to last night and brings everyone a treat from there. Everyone shares their own experience going to a restaurant and are inspired to open a pretend restaurant. They make pretend food, learn how to use good manners while dining in a restaurant, and come up with a story about Simple Simon opening a restaurant and how to treat guests.
47	23	"Down on the Farm"	November 12, 1999	223
The children pretend to live on a farm.
48	24	"Pajama Party"	November 15, 1999	224
The children throw a pretend pajama party.
49	25	"Whodunit?"	November 27, 1999	225
The children use their problem-solving skills to solve a mystery. Then they act out a version of Rumpelstiltskin.
50	26	"Happy Holidays!"	December 6, 1999	226
Tony and Vivian host a winter holiday party and learn about the children's different holiday traditions. They also make a holiday gift book containing photographs and drawings, and perform a version of The Gift of the Magi. Note: With five kids, this is the only episode to feature more than the usual three. It is also the first time that the kids join in the goodbye song. The second was "Revealing Feelings".
51	27	"Goin' to the Grocery"	December 8, 1999	227
The children pretend about going to the grocery store.
52	28	"Sing a Song"	December 13, 1999	228
Vivian has trouble singing "When the Saints Go Marching In" so the kids need to figure out the missing lyrics. Note: This was one of three episodes to have the Goodbye Song played on the guitar. The others were "Campout Kids" and "It's Mothers Day".
53	29	"Rainbow Colors"	December 16, 1999	229
The children play with colors.
54	30	"Family Fare"	December 29, 1999	230
When Vivian brings her dollhouse to the clubhouse, the gang talk about their homes and families and then act out a sequel to Cinderella.
55	31	"Happy Birthday to Us!"	January 7, 2000	231
The children pretend that it is everyone's birthday by putting on dress-up clothes, playing musical chairs and making party decorations. Then they act out a version of The Little Red Hen.
56	32	"Revealing Feelings"	January 11, 2000	232
Tony is home sick so Vivian has to watch the kids by herself. She uncharacteristically tries to distract them from their feelings which results in Celine arguing with Aleisha. Vivian helps the kids talk about their feelings about Tony's absence, make him get well cards, and act out the importance of sharing feelings with a rendition of "Cinderella." Note: This is the only episode in which Tony is absent. It is also the second time that the kids join in the goodbye song. The first was "Happy Holidays".

=== Season 3 (2000) ===
No. overall	No. in season	Title	Original release date	Prod. code
57	1	"Pattern Pattern"	November 1, 2000	301
The children play with patterns. Then they act out a version of The Three Little Pigs.
58	2	"Leap Frog Leap!"	November 2, 2000	302
The gang hops like frogs, makes their own frogs, and acts out a version of The Frog Prince.
59	3	"Join the Parade"	November 3, 2000	303
Tony, Vivian, and the children have their own parade. Then they act out a story where Little Bo Peep, Little Boy Blue, and The Little Red Hen (Rooster) have one.
60	4	"Winning the Gold"	November 6, 2000	304
The children hold their own Olympics. Then they act out a version of the story of Hercules.
61	5	"Brick by Brick"	November 7, 2000	305
The children build a town as pretend construction workers. Then they act out a version of The Old Woman Who Lived in a Shoe.
62	6	"Dinosaur Romp"	November 8, 2000	306
Tony, Vivian, and the children explore dinosaurs.
63	7	"Topsy Tempo"	November 9, 2000	307
The children learn about fast and slow. Then they act out a version of The Tortoise and the Hare.
64	8	"Weather or Not!"	November 10, 2000	308
The children learn about the different kinds of weather.
65	9	"It's Mother's Day!"	November 13, 2000	309
The children rehearse their performance and make personalized invitations to their mothers. Note: This was the last of three episodes to have the Goodbye Song played on the guitar, only this time on a lower key. The others were "Campout Kids" and "Sing a Song".
66	10	"Listen Up!"	November 14, 2000	310
The children learn the differences between loud and soft sounds. Then they act out a version of The Country Mouse and the City Mouse.
67	11	"Thinkin' Lincoln"	November 15, 2000	311
The children talk about Abraham Lincoln and learn what it means to be a great leader. Then they act out a story of Abe getting a vice president.
68	12	"Horsing Around"	November 16, 2000	312
The children learn how to pretend to be horses and act out their version of how The Pony Express (and then horseshoes) was invented.
69	13	"Making Mistakes"	November 17, 2000	313
The group makes up mistakes. Then they act out a sequel to Cinderella where her prince and fairy godmother makes mistakes.
70	14	"Tickets, Please!"	November 20, 2000	314
The children are playing carnival games. They also act out a story about the Three Billy Goats Gruff getting stopped by a competitive troll on the way to a carnival.
71	15	"Pop to It!"	November 21, 2000	315
The children have fun with popcorn and go on a make-believe trip to the movies.
72	16	"Read the Signs"	November 22, 2000	316
The children learn how to read signs and follow directions. Then they act out a version of Hansel and Gretel.
73	17	"First Things First"	November 23, 2000	317
The children learn about the importance of order.
74	18	"A One and a Two"	November 24, 2000	318
The children learn how to have fun playing alone - an important life skill. Then they act out a version of Noah's Ark.
75	19	"Bendy Stretchy"	November 27, 2000	319
The children learn the importance of bending and stretching.
76	20	"Alike and Different"	November 28, 2000	320
The children learn about differences. They later act out a version of Beauty and the Beast.
77	21	"Happy New Year!"	November 29, 2000	321
Note: This episode is not listed in copyright registry and did not air on Disney Junior Canada
78	22	"It's Father's Day"	November 30, 2000	322
The children play games with their dads and pretend to be fathers themselves. Then they act out a version of The Three Bears.
79	23	"Surprise, Surprise"	December 1, 2000	323
The children learn the importance of friends and sharing.
80	24	"Wonderful Words!" (Note: Title misspelled in the copyright registry as "Wonderful World")	December 4, 2000	324
The children act out a rhyming story.
81	25	"Nutcracker Sweet"	December 5, 2000	325
The children talk about their favorite toys, make toys of their own, and act out a version of The Nutcracker.
82	26	"Kids Are Kids"	December 6, 2000	326
The children learn about accepting differences.
