= Playhouse Disney =

International group of television channels for preschool aged children

- Logo used from 2002
- Country: United States
- Broadcast area: Nationwide
- Network: Disney Channel
- Headquarters: Burbank, California, United States

Programming
- Languages: English; Spanish (via SAP audio track)

Ownership
- Owner: The Walt Disney Company
- Parent: Disney Channels Worldwide
- Sister channels: Disney Channel; Disney XD; Toon Disney

History
- Launched: April 6, 1997; 29 years ago (as Disney Channel Little Kids); February 1, 1999; 27 years ago (as Playhouse Disney)
- Closed: February 14, 2011; 15 years ago (replaced by Disney Junior); 2011–2013 (International)

Links
- Website: tv.disney.go.com/playhouse (Redirects to Disney NOW)

Playhouse Disney was a brand of programming blocks and international cable and satellite television channels that were owned by the Disney Channels Worldwide unit (now Disney Branded Television) of The Walt Disney Company's Disney–ABC Television Group. It originated in the United States as a morning program block on the Disney Channel. Aimed mainly at children at two to seven years of age, its programming featured a mix of live-action and animated series.

The Playhouse Disney block on Disney Channel was rebranded as the Disney Junior block on Disney Channel on February 14, 2011. The remaining channels and blocks using the Playhouse Disney brand outside the US relaunched under the Disney Junior brand over the next two years, concluding with the rebranding of the Playhouse Disney block on Disney Channel Russia on September 1, 2013.

== History ==
=== Early years (1999–2002) ===
Prior to Playhouse Disney's launch, Disney Channel had aired a lineup of preschool-targeted programs to compete with Nick Jr. (which were mixed alongside animated series aimed at older children) during the morning hours since its debut in April 1983.

On April 6, 1997, Disney Channel underwent a relaunch that signified the beginning of its full conversion into a commercial-free basic cable channel, and its preschool block now utilized a similar graphics package for its promotions as that used for the channel's afternoon children's programs. After Disney Channel's preschool block premiered three new original series in 1998 (PB&J Otter, Rolie Polie Olie, and Out of the Box), the block officially launched as Playhouse Disney on February 1, 1999.

One of Playhouse Disney's most popular series was Bear in the Big Blue House, which debuted on October 20, 1997; the series was named by TV Guide as one of the "top 10 new shows for kids" that year.

For the first three years of its run, the Playhouse Disney block originally aired each weekday from 8:30 a.m. to 2:30 p.m. Eastern Time, and weekends from 6:00 to 10:00 a.m. Eastern Time. Following each program, which usually ran 23 minutes (most of which, except for films, aired without promotional interruption), the remainder of the time period was filled by either short segments and music videos (the latter of which were originally aired under the banner "Feet Beat") or an episode of an acquired short series.

On April 16, 2001, Playhouse Disney received a new rebrand produced by motion graphics company Beehive; actress Allyce Beasley began serving as the U.S. block's promo announcer at this time, a capacity she would hold until March 30, 2007, being replaced by Margit Furseth. Playhouse Disney also premiered two new original series, Stanley and The Book of Pooh, in 2001. Radio Disney cross-promoted the block by rebranding its "Mickey and Minnie's Tune Time" block as "Playhouse Disney", and in 2002, the TV block's "Feet Beat" interstitials were renamed "BB's Music Time" to promote the Radio Disney block. On June 25, 2001, Disney-ABC Cable Networks Group (now Disney-ABC Television Group) announced plans to launch Playhouse Disney Channel, a companion digital cable and satellite channel that would have served the same target audience as the Disney Channel block; plans for the network were later scrapped, although Disney-ABC International Television would launch dedicated Playhouse Disney channels and blocks in international markets (including Canada, Afro-Eurasia and Latin America) between 2002 and 2007. The Walt Disney Company acquired the broadcast rights to The Wiggles as part of their purchase of the Fox Family Channel in 2001; The Wiggles moved to Playhouse Disney in June 2002 and became one of the block's most watched shows during its run.

=== Marketing expansion (2002–2011) ===
Like Disney Channel, Playhouse Disney was a commercial-free service, but it did show short "promotional spots" (structured as short-form segments for Disney products targeted at the block's demographics) alongside underwriter sponsorships beginning in 2002, (with companies such as McDonald's) within breaks between programs (preschool-targeted programs that aired between 3:00 and 7:00 a.m. Central Time outside of the Playhouse Disney banner, included the promotional shorts for Disney entertainment products that were seen during Disney Channel's afternoon and nighttime schedule). On September 30, 2002, Playhouse Disney changed its logo to reflect Disney Channel's on-air rebranding. The block also replaced some of its older interstitial material and introduced a mascot that month named Clay (voiced by Debi Derryberry), an anthropomorphic clay figure who often used the catchphrases "It's true!" and "Are you with me?"

On March 31, 2007, Ooh and Aah, two puppet monkeys (who served as the main characters for one of the short series featured on the Playhouse Disney lineup, Ooh, Aah & You) became the official hosts of the block, replacing Clay. Every summer since 2007, Playhouse Disney's end time was truncated to four hours on weekdays (from 6:00 to 10:00 a.m. Eastern Time). Episodes from Disney Channel's original series were aired during the late morning and early afternoon hours. However, the weekend schedule continued to air for seven hours. By 2010, the Playhouse Disney block had expanded to air from 4:00 a.m. to 2:00 p.m. Eastern Time on weekdays, and 4:00 to 9:00 a.m. Eastern Time on weekends, each running a different schedule.

=== Rebranding as Disney Junior ===
On May 26, 2010, Disney-ABC Television Group announced the relaunch of Playhouse Disney as Disney Junior, which would serve as the brand for the Disney Channel block and a new standalone digital cable and satellite channel in the United States, as well as the new brand for the existing Playhouse Disney-branded cable channels and program blocks outside the US. The Playhouse Disney block ended its almost 14-year run on February 13, 2011, with the last program to air being an episode of the short series Handy Manny's School for Tools at 8:55 a.m. Eastern Time.

The Disney Junior block debuted on February 14, 2011, with the Little Einsteins episode "Fire Truck Rocket" as its first program. Several former Playhouse Disney series were carried over to the relaunched block including Mickey Mouse Clubhouse, Special Agent Oso, Imagination Movers, Handy Manny, and Little Einsteins. With the relaunch of the block, the block's mascots Ooh and Aah were retired and several of its older programs were entirely discontinued (however, Ooh and Aah & You was later briefly available on the Disney Junior website as a part of the Fan Favorites week of July 18, 2011 and was also later carried in reruns on the Disney Junior cable channel). Additionally, its episodes are available on Disney Junior's YouTube channel as of January 6, 2011.

The 24-hour Disney Junior cable channel debuted on March 23, 2012, with the Mickey Mouse Clubhouse episode "Mickey's Big Surprise" as its first program, mainly featuring a mix of original series and programs held over from the Playhouse Disney library (which largely aired as part of the channel's overnight schedule until mid-2014 when over time, more Playhouse Disney shows were taken off the air completely after premiering their series finales and ceased to air in reruns). Disney Junior took over the channel space held by the Disney-owned soap opera-focused channel Soapnet, largely due to that channel's declining subscriber reach (being carried in 75 million households with pay television at the time of Disney Junior's launch). An automated Soapnet feed remained in operation for providers that did not yet reach agreements to carry the Disney Junior channel or providers that were required to continue carrying Soapnet in addition to Disney Junior until Soapnet fully ceased operations by quietly shutting down on December 31, 2013, at 11:59 pm, following an episode of General Hospital as the last program to air on the network.

== Programming ==
=== Final programming ===
==== Original programming ====
Title	First air date	Last air date	Source(s)	Note(s)
Little Einsteins	October 9, 2005	February 13, 2011		The show ended on December 22, 2009, but continued to air reruns on Playhouse Disney until February 13, 2011.
Mickey Mouse Clubhouse	May 5, 2006	February 13, 2011		
Handy Manny	September 16, 2006	February 13, 2011		
My Friends Tigger & Pooh	May 12, 2007	February 13, 2011		The show ended on October 9, 2010, but continued to air reruns on Playhouse Disney until February 13, 2011.
Imagination Movers	September 6, 2008	February 13, 2011		
Special Agent Oso	April 4, 2009	February 13, 2011		
Jungle Junction	October 5, 2009	February 13, 2011		

==== Acquired programming ====
Title	First air date	Last air date	Source(s)	Note(s)
Charlie and Lola	March 21, 2005	February 13, 2011		
Chuggington	January 18, 2010	February 13, 2011		
Timmy Time	September 13, 2010	February 11, 2011		

==== Interstitial programming ====
Title	First air date	Last air date	Source(s)
Shanna's Show	2003	2011	
Choo Choo Soul	May 1, 2006	2011	
Lou and Lou: Safety Patrol	June 16, 2006	2011	
Happy Monster Band	October 1, 2007	2011	
Ooh, Aah & You	July 15, 2005	2011	
Shane's Kindergarten Countdown	June 20, 2005	2011	
Can You Teach My Alligator Manners?	June 21, 2008	2011	
Tasty Time with ZeFronk	November 8, 2008	2011	
Whiffle and Fuzz	2008	2011	
Where Is Warehouse Mouse?	August 24, 2009	2011	
Dance-A-Lot Robot	February 27, 2010	2011	
Handy Manny's School for Tools	January 25, 2010	2011	

=== Former programming ===
==== Original programming ====
Title	First air date	Last air date	Source(s)
Bear in the Big Blue House (Note: The Walt Disney Company acquired Bear in the Big Blue House from The Jim Henson Company in 2004. The transaction included all of the series' characters, television library, copyrights and trademarks.)	October 25, 1997	May 6, 2007	
PB&J Otter	March 21, 1998	June 24, 2006	
Rolie Polie Olie (Note: Co-production.)	October 3, 1998	December 30, 2006	
Out of the Box	October 10, 1998	June 24, 2006	
The Book of Pooh	January 27, 2001	June 24, 2006	
Stanley	September 15, 2001	May 16, 2008	
JoJo's Circus	September 20, 2003	January 2, 2009	
Higglytown Heroes	September 11, 2004	March 29, 2009	
Johnny and the Sprites	October 15, 2005	January 2, 2009	
Bunnytown	November 10, 2007	November 8, 2008	

==== Acquired programming ====
Title	First air date	Last air date	Source(s)
TaleSpin	April 6, 1997	October 2, 1998	
Chip 'n Dale Rescue Rangers	April 6, 1997	August 29, 1999	
Amazing Animals	April 6, 1997	January 2, 2000	
The Little Mermaid	April 7, 1997	September 29, 2002	
The New Adventures of Winnie the Pooh	April 7, 1997	August 1, 2006	
Adventures in Wonderland	April 7, 1997	June 5, 1998	
Katie and Orbie	June 2, 1997	December 31, 1999	
Madeline	June 2, 1997	September 4, 2005	
Jungle Cubs	September 15, 1997	September 3, 2000	
101 Dalmatians: The Series	October 5, 1998	July 16, 1999	
Sing Me a Story with Belle	October 5, 1998	September 3, 2000	
Rupert	September 4, 2000	January 2001	
The Wiggles	June 17, 2002	May 24, 2009	
Anatole	September 17, 2002	September 13, 2004	
The Koala Brothers	January 26, 2004	May 16, 2008	
The Doodlebops	April 11, 2005	January 2, 2009	

==== Interstitial programming ====
- Circle Time (April 6, 1997 – September 29, 2002)
- Curious George (April 6, 1997 – 1999)
- Will Quack Quack (April 6, 1997 – 1999)
- The Adventures of Spot (April 6, 1997 – September 29, 2002)
- Joke Time (April 6, 1997 – September 29, 2002)
- Behind the Ears (1997–2000, 2007–2009)
- Microscopic Milton (1997 – September 29, 2002)
- Frankenguy and the Professor (November 1997 – September 29, 2002)
- Magic Drawings (1998 – April 15, 2001)
- Feet Beat (1998 – September 29, 2002)
- Pablo the Little Red Fox (1999 – September 29, 2002)
- Animal Stories (1999 – September 29, 2002)
- Poky and Friends (1999 – April 15, 2001)
- Mini Movies (April 16, 2001 – September 29, 2002)
- Stanley's Animal Facts (2001–2006)
- Wiggles Time (January 28, 2002 – March 29, 2007)
- Mike's Super Short Show (January 1, 2002 – 2007)
- BB's Music Time (September 30, 2002 – 2007)
- Good Manners with Max Time (September 30, 2002 – 2007)
- Mickey's Letter Time (September 30, 2002 – 2006)
- Page's Word of the Day (September 30, 2002 – 2007)
- Sharing Time (September 30, 2002 – 2005)
- Use Your Noodle Time (September 30, 2002 – 2005)
- Who, What & Where with Bear Time (September 30, 2002 – 2004)
- Mini Show-and-Tell Time (2003–2007)
  - Higglytown Heroes (2003)
  - Marcel's Animal Friends (2003)
- Project Playtime (2003–2007)
- Adventures in Nutrition with Captain Carlos (2004–2007)
- Felix and the Flying Machine (2004–2007)
- Here Come the ABCs (January 1, 2005 – 2006)
- Go, Baby! (January 3, 2005 – 2007)
- Breakfast with Bear (June 20, 2005 – September 15, 2006)
- This is Daniel Cook (July 11, 2005 – January 2, 2009)
- Johnny and the Sprites (October 9, 2005 – January 13, 2007)
- Feeling Good with JoJo (February 20, 2006 – 2008)
- Dan Zanes House Party (June 5, 2006 – December 19, 2008)
- Here Come the 123s (2007)
- This is Emily Yeung (February 20, 2007 – January 4, 2009)

=== Programming blocks ===
==== Final ====
- Movie Time Monday (2005–2010); movies aired:
  - A Bug's Life
  - Aladdin
  - Aladdin and the King of Thieves
  - Alice in Wonderland
  - The Aristocats
  - Beauty and the Beast: The Enchanted Christmas
  - The Care Bears' Big Wish Movie
  - Care Bears: Journey to Joke-a-lot
  - Chicken Little
  - Cinderella II: Dreams Come True
  - Cinderella III: A Twist in Time
  - Finding Nemo
  - Hercules
  - Lady and the Tramp II: Scamp's Adventure
  - Lilo & Stitch
  - The Many Adventures of Winnie the Pooh
  - Mickey, Donald, Goofy: The Three Musketeers
  - Mickey's Once Upon a Christmas
  - Mickey's Twice Upon a Christmas
  - Monsters, Inc.
  - Mulan
  - Mulan II
  - My Little Pony: A Very Minty Christmas
  - Oliver & Company
  - Our Huge Adventure
  - Piglet's Big Movie
  - Pocahontas
  - Pocahontas II: Journey to a New World
  - Pooh's Grand Adventure: The Search for Christopher Robin
  - Pooh's Heffalump Movie
  - Pooh's Heffalump Halloween Movie
  - Robin Hood
  - Rolie Polie Olie: The Great Defender of Fun
  - Rolie Polie Olie: The Baby Bot Chase
  - Racing to the Rainbow
  - Santa's Rockin'!
  - Spookley the Square Pumpkin
  - Stanley's Dinosaur Round-Up
  - Stanley's Great Big Book of Adventure
  - Tarzan
  - Tarzan II: The Legend Begins
  - The Emperor's New Groove
  - The Jungle Book 2
  - The Lion King II: Simba's Pride
  - The Little Mermaid: Ariel's Beginning
  - The Tigger Movie
  - Toy Story
  - Toy Story 2
  - Winnie the Pooh: Springtime with Roo

==== Former ====
- Super Duper Playhouse Disney Special Event (2002–2005)

== International ==
On September 1, 1999, the Playhouse Disney brand was extended internationally with the launch of a self-branded block on Disney Channel in the United Kingdom and Ireland. On September 29, 2000, Disney Television International expanded the block with the launch of a channel in the country alongside the launch of Toon Disney and Disney Channel +1 on the Sky Digital platform. On April 4, 2009, Egmont Group launched a companion Playhouse Disney magazine in the United Kingdom & Republic of Ireland that focused on the channel's four most popular shows: Mickey Mouse Clubhouse, My Friends Tigger & Pooh, Handy Manny and Little Einsteins. Each issue included "to do" pages and suggested activities for parents and children based on an educational theme. The Playhouse Disney block on Disney Channel UK & Republic of Ireland was eventually disposed of in July 2004 after reducing hours of programming. The Playhouse Disney channel available there, however, continued to air until it was replaced by Disney Junior on May 7, 2011.

On November 30, 2007, Astral Media launched a Canadian English-language version of Playhouse Disney Channel under a brand licensing agreement with Disney-ABC Television Group; the channel operated as a multiplex channel of Family Channel, which had long maintained a programming distribution agreement with Disney Channel for the domestic rights to the U.S. channel's series until January 2016. Astral also launched a French-language version of Playhouse Disney on July 5, 2010, under a separate license. Both channels were both replaced by Disney Junior on May 6, 2011.

=== List of international channels and blocks ===
Market	Type	Formerly	Launch date	Replaced by	Replaced date
United Kingdom	Channel	Block on Disney Channel	September 29, 2000	Disney Junior	May 7, 2011
United Kingdom	+1 timeshift channel	—N/a	November 3, 2007	Disney Junior +1	May 7, 2011
United Kingdom	Block on ABC1	—N/a	Summer 2006	—N/a	September 26, 2007
United States	Block on Disney Channel	—N/a	February 1, 1999	Disney Junior	February 14, 2011
Spain	Channel	—N/a	November 16, 2001	Disney Junior	June 11, 2011
Israel	Block on Disney Channel	—N/a	2009	Disney Junior	July 18, 2011
Greece	Block on ERT2	—N/a	2004	—N/a	2009
Greece	Channel	Jetix Play	September 1, 2010	Disney Junior	June 1, 2011
Middle East & North Africa	Channel	Jetix Play	September 1, 2010	Disney Junior	June 1, 2011
Middle East & North Africa	Block	—N/a	2000	Disney Junior	June 1, 2011
South Africa	Channel	—N/a	2010	Disney Junior	June 1, 2011
Russia	Block on Disney Channel	—N/a	August 10, 2010	Disney Junior	September 1, 2013
Romania	Block	—N/a	September 19, 2009	Disney Junior	June 1, 2011
Southeast Asia	Block	—N/a	2000	Disney Junior	July 11, 2011
Australia	Block on Seven Network	—N/a	2003	—N/a	2008
Australia	Block on Disney Channel	—N/a	2000	Disney Junior	May 29, 2011
Australia	Channel	—N/a	December 2005	Disney Junior	May 29, 2011
France	Channel	—N/a	November 2, 2002	Disney Junior	May 28, 2011
France	HD simulcast channel	—N/a	2009	Disney Junior	May 28, 2011
France	Block	—N/a	2002	Disney Junior	May 28, 2011
Taiwan	Block	—N/a	2000	Disney Junior	September 1, 2011
Japan	Block	—N/a	—N/a	Disney Junior	July 3, 2011
Hong Kong	Channel	—N/a	April 2, 2004	Disney Junior	July 11, 2011
Malaysia	Channel	—N/a	July 3, 2004	Disney Junior	July 11, 2011
Singapore	Channel	—N/a	May 15, 2004	Disney Junior	July 11, 2011
Indonesia	Channel	—N/a	April 2, 2004	Disney Junior	July 11, 2011
Germany	Channel	—N/a	November 10, 2004	Disney Junior	July 14, 2011
Thailand	Channel	—N/a	January 2005	Disney Junior	July 11, 2011
Cambodia	Channel	—N/a	June 20, 2005	Disney Junior	July 11, 2011
Vietnam	Channel	—N/a	May 2005	Disney Junior	July 11, 2011
Philippines	Channel	—N/a	December 2005	Disney Junior	July 11, 2011
South Korea	Channel	—N/a	June 12, 2004	Disney Junior	July 11, 2011
India	Block on Disney Channel	—N/a	2006	Disney Junior	2011
Argentina	Block on an El Trece channel	—N/a	2007	—N/a	—N/a
Scandinavia	Block	—N/a	March 1, 2003	Disney Junior	September 10, 2011
Sweden	Channel	—N/a	2007	Disney Junior	September 10, 2011
Norway	Channel	—N/a	2006	Disney Junior	September 10, 2011
Denmark	Channel	—N/a	2006	Disney Junior	September 10, 2011
Finland	Channel	—N/a	2006	Disney Junior	September 10, 2011
Iceland	Channel	—N/a	2006	Disney Junior	September 10, 2011
Canada (operated by Astral Media)	Channel	—N/a	November 30, 2007	Disney Junior	May 6, 2011
Canada (operated by Astral Media)	French language channel (Playhouse Disney Télé)	—N/a	July 5, 2010	Disney Junior	—N/a
Latin America	Channel (two feeds)	—N/a	June 1, 2008	Disney Junior	April 1, 2011
Latin America	Channel (Brazil)	—N/a	September 5, 2008	Disney Junior	April 1, 2011
Portugal	Block on Disney Channel	—N/a	November 28, 2001	Disney Junior	June 1, 2011
Central & Eastern Europe	Channel	Jetix Play	2010	Disney Junior	June 2011
Central & Eastern Europe	Block	Jetix Play	September 19, 2009	Disney Junior	June 2011
Poland	Channel	Jetix Play	September 1, 2010	Disney Junior	2011
Czech Republic; Slovakia	Block	Jetix Play	2010	Disney Junior	June 1, 2011
Italy	Channel	—N/a	May 1, 2005	Disney Junior	May 14, 2011
Italy	+1 timeshift channel	—N/a	July 31, 2009	Disney Junior +1	2011
Turkey	Channel	Jetix Play	September 1, 2010	Disney Junior	2011
Netherlands; Belgium	Channel	—N/a	May 3, 2010	Disney Junior	September 10, 2011
Netherlands; Belgium	Block on Disney Channel	—N/a	May 3, 2010	Disney Junior	September 10, 2011

== See also ==
- Nick Jr. Channel – a preschool-targeted digital cable and satellite network that originated as a program block on Nickelodeon from 1988 to 2009 and a channel since 2009.
- Sprout (TV channel) – a defunct preschool-targeted digital cable and satellite network. It has since rebranded as a youth audience channel, Universal Kids, as of 2017.
- Disney Junior – the successor, a channel that is based on Playhouse Disney and has been airing since 2011 as a television block on Disney Channel and a channel since 2012.
