= List of Special Agent Oso episodes =

Special Agent Oso is an American animated children's television series created by Ford Riley for Playhouse Disney and Disney Junior. The series debuted on April 4, 2009 and ended on May 17, 2012. The series had a total of 60 episodes over two seasons.

The episode titles are parodies of the names of James Bond movies, novels, songs, and quotes.

== Series overview ==
Season	Segments	Episodes		Originally released		
Season	Segments	Episodes		First released	Last released	Network
1	48	24		April 4, 2009	April 17, 2010	Playhouse Disney
2	30	36	16	May 6, 2010	January 24, 2011	Playhouse Disney
2	36	36	20	February 14, 2011	May 17, 2012	Disney Junior
Three Healthy Steps	—N/a	15 (spin-off)		February 14, 2011	March 7, 2011	Disney Junior

== Episodes ==
=== Season 1 (2009–10) ===
No. overall	No. in season	Title	Written by	Original release date	Prod. code
1a	1a	"To Grandma with Love"	Ford Riley	April 4, 2009	101a
1b	1b	"Gold Flower"	Silvia Olivas	April 4, 2009	101b
2a	2a	"Never Say No Brushing Again"	Krista Tucker	April 4, 2009	102a
2b	2b	"The Girl with the Golden Book"	Noelle Wright	April 4, 2009	102b
3a	3a	"Live and Jump Rope"	Krista Tucker	April 5, 2009	103a
3b	3b	"A View to a Kitten"	Sean Diviny	April 5, 2009	103b
4a	4a	"A View to a Book"	Ford Riley	April 6, 2009	104a
4b	4b	"Diamonds are for Kites"	Brian Swenlin	April 6, 2009	104b
5a	5a	"The Boy with the Golden Gift"	John Loy	April 7, 2009	105a
5b	5b	"Birthdays are Forever"	Ford Riley	April 7, 2009	105b
6a	6a	"Carousel Royale"	Noelle Wright	April 8, 2009	106a
6b	6b	"Leaf Raker"	John Loy	April 8, 2009	106b
7a	7a	"Thunder Berries"	John Loy	April 9, 2009	107a
7b	7b	"Flowers are Forever"	Noelle Wright	April 9, 2009	107b
8a	8a	"For Your Nice Bunny"	Brian Swenlin	April 10, 2009	108a
8b	8b	"For Pancakes with Love"	Holly Huckins	April 10, 2009	108b
9a	9a	"License to Clean"	John Loy	April 11, 2009	109a
9b	9b	"On Her Cousin's Special Salad"	Brian Swenlin	April 11, 2009	109b
10a	10a	"Hide Another Day"	Jack Monaco	April 13, 2009	110a
10b	10b	"Live and Let Dry"	John Loy	April 13, 2009	110b
11a	11a	"Dr. Off"	Ford Riley	April 18, 2009	111a
11b	11b	"License to Dress"	Krista Tucker	April 18, 2009	111b
12a	12a	"Octo Puzzle"	Brian Swenlin	April 25, 2009	112a
12b	12b	"One Suitcase is Now Enough"	John Loy	April 25, 2009	112b
13a	13a	"Three Wheels are Not Enough"	Phil Harnage	May 2, 2009	113a
13b	13b	"A Zoo to a Thrill"	Brian Swenlin	May 2, 2009	113b
14a	14a	"The Girl Who Cheered Me"	Jack Monaco	May 16, 2009	114a
14b	14b	"License to Twirl"	Noelle Wright	May 16, 2009	114b
15a	15a	"For Show and Tell Only"	Brian Swenlin	May 23, 2009	115a
15b	15b	"Piggy Bank Royale"	John Loy	May 23, 2009	115b
16a	16a	"Hopscotch Royale"	Brian Swenlin	May 30, 2009	116a
16b	16b	"Goldringer"	John Loy	May 30, 2009	116b
17a	17a	"The Living Flashlight"	Noelle Wright	June 13, 2009	117a
17b	17b	"Sandcastle Royale"	Krista Tucker	June 13, 2009	117b
18a	18a	"License to Chill"	Dana Monahan	July 18, 2009	118a
18b	18b	"GoldenFly"	Noelle Wright	July 18, 2009	118b
19a	19a	"Tie Another Day"	Krista Tucker	August 24, 2009	119a
19b	19b	"You Only Start Preschool Once"	John Loy	August 24, 2009	119b
20a	20a	"Goldfeather"	Sean Diviny	October 3, 2009	120a
20b	20b	"Live and Let Ride"	Noelle Wright	October 3, 2009	120b
21a	21a	"For Your Pies Only"	Noelle Wright	November 7, 2009	121a
21b	21b	"The Plates are Not Enough"	Brian Swenlin	November 7, 2009	121b
22a	22a	"For Your Ice Only"	John Loy	December 5, 2009	122a
22b	22b	"Coldfingers"	Noelle Wright	December 5, 2009	122b
23a	23a	"Nobody Draws it Better"	Phil Harnage	January 30, 2010	123a
23b	23b	"Thunderbubble"	Brian Swenlin	January 30, 2010	123b
24a	24a	"Recycling is Forever"	John Loy	April 17, 2010	124a
24b	24b	"Goldswinger"	John Loy	April 17, 2010	124b

=== Season 2 (2010–12) ===
No. overall	No. in season	Title	Written by	Original release date	Prod. code
25a	1a	"Quantum of Sandwich"	John Loy	May 6, 2010	201a
25b	1b	"Thunder Muffin"	Noelle Wright	May 6, 2010	201b
26a	2a	"Dr. Go"	Noelle Wright	July 17, 2010	202a
26b	2b	"For Your Bed Only"	John Loy	July 17, 2010	202b
27a	3a	"Another Way to Fly"	Ford Riley	July 10, 2010	201a
27b	3b	"A View to a Ball"	Ford Riley	July 10, 2010	201b
28a	4a	"From China with Love"	Ford Riley	July 24, 2010	203a
28b	4b	"Thunderbasket"	Written by : John Loy; Story by : Ford Riley	July 24, 2010	203b
29a	5a	"Goldscooter"	John Loy	July 31, 2010	204a
29b	5b	"The Boy with the Colored Crayons"	Kent Redeker	July 31, 2010	204b
30a	6a	"Goldputter"	Noelle Wright	August 7, 2010	205a
30b	6b	"Live and Leaf Rub"	Krista Tucker	August 7, 2010	205b
31a	7a	"Dr. Juice"	Noelle Wright	August 14, 2010	206a
31b	7b	"For Your Nose Only"	Krista Tucker	August 14, 2010	206b
32a	8a	"The Man with the Golden Retriever"	Jack Monaco	August 21, 2010	207a
32b	8b	"The Chairs are Not Enough"	John Loy	August 21, 2010	207b
33a	9a	"Colors Royale"	Noelle Wright	October 4, 2010	209a
33b	9b	"Cleanfingers"	Jack Monaco	October 4, 2010	209b
34a	10a	"A View to a Mask"	Jack Monaco	October 8, 2010	210a
34b	10b	"Pumpkin Eyes"	Written by : Kent Redeker; Story by : Ford Riley	October 8, 2010	210b
35	11	"The Living Holiday Lights"	Ford Riley; John Loy; Jonathan Rosenthal	December 6, 2010	211
36a	12a	"For Angels with Snow"	John Loy	December 13, 2010	212a
36b	12b	"Dr. Snow"	Written by : Kent Redeker; Story by : Ford Riley	December 13, 2010	212b
37a	13a	"License to Sled"	Noelle Wright	December 27, 2010	213a
37b	13b	"Snowflakes are Forever"	Krista Tucker	December 27, 2010	213b
38a	14a	"Dr. Throw"	Krista Tucker	January 7, 2011	214a
38b	14b	"Nobody Plays "it" Better"	Written by : John Loy; Story by : Don Gillies	January 7, 2011	214b
39a	15a	"On Old MacDonald's Special Song"	Dan Riley	April 4, 2011	218a
39b	15b	"Snapfingers"	Jack Monaco	April 4, 2011	218b
40a	16a	"Quantum of Sauce"	John Loy	January 24, 2011	215a
40b	16b	"The Girl with the Folded Clothes"	Krista Tucker	January 24, 2011	215b
41a	17a	"Greenfinger"	John Loy; Jonathan Rosenthal	February 14, 2011	216a
41b	17b	"For Sleepy Eyes Only"	Jack Monaco	February 14, 2011	216b
42a	18a	"Live and Let Heal"	Mike Rabb	February 23, 2011	217a
42b	18b	"GoldenFish"	Noelle Wright	February 23, 2011	217b
43a	19a	"For Tamales with Love"	Maria Escobedo; Charles Gherardi	September 15, 2011	227a
43b	19b	"Piñata Royale"	Don Gillies	September 15, 2011	227b
44a	20a	"Lost and Get Found"	John Loy	April 6, 2011	220a
44b	20b	"A View to the Truth"	John Loy	April 6, 2011	220b
45a	21a	"License to Order"	Guy Toubes	April 5, 2011	219a
45b	21b	"Table Manners are Forever"	Krista Tucker	April 5, 2011	219b
46a	22a	"A View to a Fire Drill"	Krista Tucker	April 7, 2011	221a
46b	22b	"Thunderbelt"	Noelle Wright	April 7, 2011	221b
47a	23a	"License to Cheer Up"	John Loy	November 8, 2011	229a
47b	23b	"You Only Vote Once"	Earl Kress	November 8, 2011	229b
48a	24a	"Quantum of Celery"	Written by : Kent Redeker; Story by : Ford Riley	April 8, 2011	222a
48b	24b	"Drink Another Day"	Written by : Krista Tucker; Story by : Dan Riley	April 8, 2011	222b
49a	25a	"Dye Another Egg"	Noelle Wright	April 6, 2012	235a
49b	25b	"Dr. Skip"	Krista Tucker	April 6, 2012	235b
50a	26a	"For Your Hands Only"	Jack Monaco	May 6, 2011	223a
50b	26b	"Thunderbeam"	Noelle Wright	May 6, 2011	223b
51a	27a	"Best Friends are Forever"	John Loy	September 2, 2011	226a
51b	27b	"For School Days Only"	Krista Tucker	September 2, 2011	226b
52a	28a	"A View to a Goal"	Krista Tucker	May 30, 2011	224a
52b	28b	"Sweep Another Day"	John Loy	May 30, 2011	224b
53a	29a	"Freeze Dance Royale"	Krista Tucker	August 12, 2011	225a
53b	29b	"The Boy with the Cardboard Fort"	John Loy	August 12, 2011	225b
54a	30a	"Goldfanner"	Krista Tucker; John Loy	January 24, 2012	231a
54b	30b	"Connect Another Dot"	Krista Tucker	January 24, 2012	231b
55a	31a	"License to Share"	Written by : Kent Redeker; Story by : Ford Riley	January 25, 2012	232a
55b	31b	"Live and Be Polite"	Krista Tucker	January 25, 2012	232b
56	32	"The Manny with the Golden Bear"	Written by : Krista Tucker; Story by : Ford Riley; John Loy	March 30, 2012	234
57a	33a	"Sock Puppet Royale"	Written by : John Loy; Story by : Krista Tucker	October 7, 2011	228a
57b	33b	"Costume of Solace"	Written by : John Loy; Story by : Chris Nee	October 7, 2011	228b
58a	34a	"Diamonds are for Baseball"	Krista Tucker	May 17, 2012	236a
58b	34b	"Tomorrow Never Ducks"	Krista Tucker	May 17, 2012	236b
59a	35a	"The Sitter Who Watched Me"	Krista Tucker	January 26, 2012	233a
59b	35b	"Potty Royale"	Written by : John Loy; Story by : Chris Nee	January 26, 2012	233b
60	36	"Thundersmall"	John Loy; Ford Riley	January 23, 2012	230

== Three Healthy Steps (2011) ==
Special Agent Oso: Three Healthy Steps is a short series that aired in the United States during the Disney Junior programming block. The spin-off premiered on February 14th, 2011 and ended on March 7th of the same year. It encourages children to use "three healthy steps" regarding eating, being healthy, and exercising.

This series combined both animated characters and real life actors. The animated characters that are featured in the short series are Special Agent Oso, Paw Pilot, Special Agent Wolfie, Special Agent Dotty, and Professor Buffo.

No.	Title	Original release date
1	"Jump Rope"	February 14, 2011
Child(ren): Maria Setting: Rome, Italy Based on episode: Live and Jump Rope
2	"Shoot a Basketball"	February 17, 2011
Child(ren): David Setting: Quincy, Illinois Based on episode: Thunderbasket
3	"Swing on a Swing"	February 18, 2011
Child(ren): Li Ming Setting: Wuhan, China Based on episode: Goldswinger
4	"Make Orange Juice"	February 19, 2011
Child(ren): Emma Setting: Busan, South Korea Based on episode: Dr. Juice
5	"Catch a Ball"	February 20, 2011
Child(ren): Kenji Setting: Tokyo, Japan Based on episode: A View to a Ball
6	"Pick Strawberries"	February 21, 2011
Child(ren): Hannah Setting: North Dakota Based on episode: Thunder Berries
7	"Play Tag"	February 24, 2011
Child(ren): Sophia, Jake and Ben Setting: Quincy, Illinois Based on episode: Nobody Plays "It" Better
8	"Order a Healthy Meal"	February 25, 2011
Child(ren): Elizabeth Setting: Toronto, Canada Based on episode: License to Order
9	"Ride a Scooter"	February 26, 2011
Child(ren): Camilla Setting: Copenhagen, Denmark Based on episode: Goldscooter
10	"Play Mini-Golf"	February 27, 2011
Child(ren): Ethan Setting: Copenhagen, Denmark Based on episode: Goldputter
11	"Twirl a Hoop-a-Loop"	February 28, 2011
Child(ren): Maddie Setting: Copenhagen, Denmark Based on episode: License to Twirl
12	"Make a Salad"	March 4, 2011
Child(ren): Nikolai and Anna Setting: Moscow, Russia Based on episode: On Her Cousin's Special Salad
13	"Play Hopscotch"	March 5, 2011
Child(ren): Lucas Setting: Porto Alegre, Brazil Based on episode: Hopscotch Royale
14	"Make a Frozen Juice Pop"	March 6, 2011
Child(ren): Alejandro Setting: Mexico City, Mexico Based on episode: License to Chill
15	"Rake Leaves"	March 7, 2011
Child(ren): Min-Joon Setting: Busan, South Korea Based on episode: Leaf Raker
