= Microscopic Milton =

British series of short animated films

Microscopic Milton is a British series of short animated films. Created and written by Tony Garth, they were first broadcast on CBBC between 1997 and 1999. The show was produced by Splash Animation Ltd and executive produced by Russell Neale Anthony Dever with distribution through EVA Entertainment. The series was self-financed and was one of the first commercially produced series on Cambridge Animo. The series was sold via acquisition to the BBC in the UK and Disney Channel in the USA. Two series were produced each of 13 X 5' being 26 eps in total.

The series follows Microscopic Milton, a tiny man who lives in a clock on the mantelpiece in a house owned by Mrs. Witherspoon (who is only seen from the shoulders down), who is unaware of Milton's existence. Milton is befriended by Mrs. Witherspoon's large, shaggy dog, Douglas.

Each episode ran five minutes, and 26 episodes were produced. The narration was provided by sitcom star Brian Wilde, while airings in the US were narrated by Kristen Johnston.

== Episode list ==
1. Milton and the Shopping Trip
2. Milton and the Bubble Bath
3. Milton and the Camping Holiday
4. Milton and the Dust Collection
5. Milton and the Fitness Plan
6. Milton and the Toybox
7. Milton and the Beanstalk
8. Milton and the Kitten
9. Milton and the Broken Clock
10. Milton and the Leprechaun
11. Milton and Mrs. Witherspoon's Wish
12. Milton and the Parrot
13. Milton and the Snowdog
14. Milton and the Space Alien
15. Milton and the Time Machine
16. Milton and the Visitor
17. Milton and the Big Freeze
18. Milton and the Birthday Party
19. Milton and the Bumblebee
20. Milton and the Circus
21. Milton and the Disappearing Dog
22. Milton and the Dog Show
23. Milton and the Dog That Ate New York
24. Milton and the Halloween Party
