= Jungle Junction =

Children's television series

- Genre: Adventure; Educational; Comedy; Preschool
- Created by: Trevor Ricketts
- Written by: Laura Beaumont; Paul Larson
- Directed by: Morgan Francis
- Creative director: Marc Forster
- Voices of: Janet James; Billy West; Keith Wickham
- Opening theme: "Jungle Junction" written and performed by Peter Lurye and Steve O'Reilly
- Ending theme: "Jungle Junction" (Instrumental)
- Composer: Mark Blackledge
- Countries of origin: United States; United Kingdom
- Original language: English
- No. of seasons: 2
- No. of episodes: 46 (92 segments)

Production
- Executive producers: Erica Darby; George Evelyn
- Production locations: Penzance, Cornwall
- Editor: Mark Edwards
- Production company: Spider Eye Productions

Original release
- Network: Playhouse Disney (season 1) Disney Junior (season 2)
- Release: October 5, 2009 – October 26, 2012

Jungle Junction is a children's television series created by Trevor Ricketts. In the United States, it was part of its Playhouse Disney block. On February 14, 2011, it was moved to its Disney Junior block, which served as Playhouse Disney's replacement. 46 episodes were produced over 2 seasons. The show follows Wheelers on their adventures. It aired on Disney Channel in the United States, and was produced by British animation company Spider Eye Productions in the UK.

== Premise ==
The series tells the story of some friends who live in a jungle together and all have wheels in place of feet, which allow them to 'zip' on the jungle's roads.

== Characters ==
=== Main ===
- Zooter Pig (voiced by Janet James) is a pink two-wheeled pig who is the jungle messenger. She can zoom around the jungle. She is Ellyvan's best friend. She says the title of every episode.
- Ellyvan Elephant (voiced by Billy West) is a blue elephant van who can deliver everything. He is Zooter's best friend. His name is a compound word, albeit fictitious. He is capable of sucking improbable quantities of liquids up his trunk and spraying them.
- Bungo Bunny (voiced by Keith Wickham) is a golden yellow bunny. He gets to put signs all over the jungle. He is the only Wheeler who is good at jumping; being able to leap many times his own height into the air. He carries a sign with the episode's title at the beginning. During the credits at the end of every episode in Season 1, he appears with signs and he asks the viewers for some help finding the right sign.

=== Recurring ===
- Taxicrab (voiced by Jess Harnell) is a red crab with eyestalks who likes to dance. He makes the greatest smoothies in the jungle. His name derives from "taxi cab", and he's the only Wheeler capable of driving sideways. Despite the fact that Toadhog is often impatient, Taxicrab tolerates him the most.
- Carla Koala (voiced by Laraine Newman) is an orange koala and cargo who owns a grocery shop. She only appears in Season 1.
- Dozer Bull (voiced by Keith Wickham) is a bull and a construction worker. His name and shape derives from "bulldozer", being a pun. His talent is digging and repairing roads with his yellow dozer blade.
- Crocker Crocodile (voiced by Keith Wickham) is a green lisping crocodile and the fire chief of the jungle. He wears a yellow helmet with a red flashing light on top. He has a skill at gardening and knows how to make compost. His name comes from the phrase which is slang in the United Kingdom, used to describe many second hand cars.
- Toadhog (voiced by Ron Orbach) is a grouchy green toad who likes Fifi flies. His sticky tongue can shoot out a long way to grab things. His name derives from "roadhog", which is used to describe an aggressive and reckless motorist. He might be responsible for Jungle Junction's power supply; his water wheel powers the generator for all the lights, and he has a supplementary generator that is used to power the Christmas lights. He loses his patience with almost everyone, except for Taxicrab.
- Hippobus (voiced by Amanda Symonds) is a bright yellow hippopotamus and school bus. Her name derives from "Hippie Bus", usually a redecorated Volkswagen Bus. She brings the five Beetlebugs to school.
- Lance Rhino (voiced by Dee Bradley Baker) is a purple rhinoceros and an ambulance. He is the jungle's doctor. His name is both a contraction of ambulance and a reference to a weapon used by lancers who attacked with it at a full charge, much like a rhino attacking things by charging at them.
- Bobby Toucan (voiced by Jimmy Hibbert) is a toucan as the police chief of the jungle. His name derives from the British slang word for police officers. He is the only Wheeler who can fly and the only one to have a 3-wheeled chassis.
- Miss Jolly Zebra (voiced by Amanda Symonds) is a zebra with black stripes. She is the school teacher as well as the only oldest and wisest of the Wheelers. She is also the only one who wears glasses.
- The Beetlebugs are tiny Wheelers. Their shape derives from the Volkswagen Beetle. Their speech is mostly synchronized. There are five of them: Reddie (the red one), Orangey (the orange one), Greenie (the green one), Bluey (the blue one), and Goldie (the yellow one).

== Episodes ==
=== Series overview ===
Season	Episodes	Originally released	
Season	Episodes	First released	Last released
1	20	October 5, 2009	February 11, 2011
2	25	February 14, 2011	October 26, 2012

=== Season 1 (2009–2011) ===
No. overall	No. in season	Title	Written by	Storyboard by	Original release date	Prod. code	Viewers (millions)
1	1	"The Treasure of Jungle Junction" "Shrinky"	Allan Neuwirth / Jimmy Hibbert	Chris Drew / Michelle Dabbs and Peter Mays	October 5, 2009	104	N/A
2	2	"Bungo to the Rescue" "Pinky Picnic"	Paul Larson and Laura Beaumont / Stan Cullimore	Richard Nye / Ben Lewis	October 6, 2009	101	N/A
3	3	"Nothing to Sneeze at" "Fire Station Hero"	Gillian Corderoy / P. Kevin Strader	Marco Piersma / Chris Drew	October 7, 2009	103	N/A
4	4	"A Beautiful Stink" "Prickly Pal"	James Mason / Paul Dawson	Marco Piersma / Chris Drew	October 8, 2009	107	N/A
5	5	"The Big Race Around" "Zooter Loses Her Zip"	Stan Cullimore / Andy Yerkes	Mark Marren / Michelle Dabbs & Peter Mays	October 9, 2009	102	N/A
6	6	"A Mystery for Bobby" "Signs of Trouble"	Claudia Silver / Dan Chambers	Colin White / Mark Marren	October 12, 2009	105	N/A
7	7	"Sap Trap" "River Race"	Story: Vanessa Amberleigh, Teleplay: Allan Neuwirth / Samantha Hill	John Perkins / Colin White	October 13, 2009	108	N/A
8	8	"The Star Juggler" "Bungo's Box"	Jill Cozza-Turner / Paul Dawson	Paul Stone / Marco Piersma	October 15, 2009	111	N/A
9	9	"Smile, Toadhog!" "Zooter's Surprise"	Story: Dave Ingham, Teleplay: Peter Hynes & Craig Carlisle / Mark Holloway	Richard Nye / Ben Lewis	October 19, 2009	106	N/A
10	10	"Stuck!" "Coconuts!"	Story: John Gilluley & Julie Mackay, Teleplay: Bridget Hurst / Claudia Silver	Chris Drew / Richard Ollive	October 26, 2009	109	N/A
11	11	"Rainy Daze" "King Ellyvan"	Samantha Hill / Mark Holloway	Richard Nye / Mark Marren	November 2, 2009	110	N/A
12	12	"The Missing Glasses" "Dozer's Daisy"	Allan Neuwirth / Jill Cozza-Turner	Marco Piersma / Richard Nye	November 20, 2009	114	N/A
13	13	"The Night Before Zipsmas" "A Gift for Zooter"	Trevor Ricketts / Jill Cozza-Turner	Mark Marren / Chris Drew	December 5, 2009	119	N/A
14	14	"Bungo the Magnificent" "Thingums"	P. Kevin Strader / Dan Chambers	Pete Western / Colin White	January 18, 2010	112	N/A
15	15	"A Bubbly Emergency" "Funny Fruit"	Bridget Hurst / Craig Carlisle	Mark Marren / Chris Drew	February 15, 2010	113	N/A
16	16	"Muddy Zooter" "Stargazing"	Jill Cozza-Turner / James Mason	Chris Drew / Richard Nye	March 22, 2010	116	N/A
17	17	"Dozer Digs" "Taxicrab's Whistle"	P. Kevin Strader	Marco Piersma / Chris Drew	April 19, 2010	117	N/A
18	18	"Wheeler Ball" "The Great Garden Caper"	Jill Cozza-Turner / Claudia Turner	Richard Ollive / Pete Western	May 31, 2010	118	N/A
19	19	"Follow That…Thing!" "The Spooky Road"	Claudia Silver / Craig Carlisle	Richard Ollive / Chris Drew	September 8, 2010	115	N/A
20	20	"Hiccup Power" "Fifi Frenzy"	Allan Neuwirth / Claudia Silver	Richard Nye / Marco Piersma	February 11, 2011	120	N/A

=== Season 2 (2011–2012) ===
No. overall	No. in season	Title	Written by	Storyboard by	Original release date	Prod. code	Viewers (millions)
21	1	"Fly, Zooter, Fly" "Ellyvan's Boing-Boing Blues"	Chris Nee / Jill Cozza-Turner	Chris Drew / Mark Marren	February 14, 2011	201	N/A
22	2	"Ripe Fruit Bungo" "Caterpillar Crossing"	Paul Dawson / Scott Gray	Mark Marren / Marco Piersma	May 9, 2011	202	N/A
23	3	"Ellyvan Goes Up" "Easy Does it, Dozer!"	Joe Purdy / Kent Redeker	Mark Marren / Marco Piersma	May 16, 2011	203	N/A
24	4	"Bungo's Wheeler Wash" "Ellyvan's Road Waffles"	Unknown	TBA	July 22, 2011	204	N/A
25	5	"Rock Around the Clock" "The Jolly"	Adam Rudman / Susan Kim	Mark Marren / Marco Piersma	August 15, 2011	205	N/A
26	6	"Floaty Fruit" "Zooter's Blanket"	James Mason / Jack Monaco	Mike Coles / Chris Drew	August 15, 2011	206	N/A
27	7	"Where's Ellyvan?" "Bobby's Hat"	Story: Joe Purdy, Teleplay: Scott Gray / Jack Monaco	Mark Marren / Marco Piersma	September 6, 2011	207	N/A
28	8	"Cadet Zooter" "Jungle Job Swap"	Adam Rudman / Jill Cozza-Turner	Richard Nye / Chris Drew	September 27, 2011	208	N/A
29	9	"Bungo's Better Best Friend" "Lance and the Jumpy Pumpkin"	Mark Holloway / Paul Dawson	Marco Piersma / Chris Drew	October 21, 2011	211	N/A
30	10	"Bobby's Road Rules" "Zooter's Strange Spots"	Joe Purdy / Scott Gray	Chris Drew / Mark Marren	November 1, 2011	209	N/A
31	11	"Bungo Leads the Way" "Ellyvan and the Zoominator"	Unknown	TBA	November 3, 2011	212	N/A
32	12	"Bungo Moves in" "Big Red Lance"	Scott Gray	Chris Drew / Richard Nye	November 15, 2011	214	N/A
33	13	"Ellyvan's Ballet Lesson" "Crocker for a Day"	Brian Hohlfeld / Myles MacLeod	Chris Drew / Marco Piersma	November 17, 2011	213	N/A
34	14	"Toadhog Goes Fishing" "Ellyvan's Whiffy Delivery"	David Pitlik / Myles MacLeod	Marco Piersma / Mark Marren	December 6, 2011	215	N/A
35	15	"Bungo's Big Bounce" "Zooter's Tire Troubles"	Laura Beaumont & Paul Larson / Jack Monaco	Arshad Mirza Baig / Chris Drew	December 8, 2011	216	N/A
36	16	"Lance in Love" "Best Buddy Mix-Up"	Paul Dawson / Susan Kim	Richard Nye / Marco Piersma	February 9, 2012	210	N/A
37	17	"Big, Little Adventure" "The Amazing Crab-Dini"	Unknown	TBA	March 5, 2012	220	N/A
38	18	"Crocker Gets Cross" "Really, Wheely Stuck"	Krista Tucker / Peggy Sarlin	Richard Nye / Marco Piersma	March 6, 2012	217	N/A
39	19	"Zooter Peeks!" "Ellyvan Says No"	Adam Rudman / Krista Tucker	Richard Nye / Chris Drew	March 7, 2012	219	N/A
40	20	"Zooter Gets a Beetlebug" "Dozer's Magic Kettle"	Laura Beaumont & Paul Larson / Susan Kim	Chris Drew / Mark Marren	March 8, 2012	218	N/A
41	21	"Bungo Joins the Club" "Stay Awake, Crocker"	Paul Dawson / Jack Monaco	Chris Drew / Peter Dodd	April 17, 2012	221	N/A
42	22	"An Excellent Party" "The Bungo-Naut"	Story: Jill Cozza-Turner, Teleplay: David Pitlik / Scott Gray	Mark Marren / Richard Nye	May 3, 2012	222	N/A
43	23	"Zooter Slips Up" "The Buzz About Toadhog"	James Mason / Story: Jimmy Hibbert, Teleplay: Krista Tucker	Marco Piersma / Arshad Mirza Baig	May 24, 2012	223	N/A
44–45	24–25	"Zooter's Surprise Delivery"	Brian Hohlfeld	Chris Drew, Mark Marren, Richard Nye & Marco Piersma	July 6, 2012	225-226	N/A
46	26	"Daredevil Ellyvan" "Bungo and the Beasties"	Peggy Sarlin & Krista Tucker / Scott Gray	Chris Drew	October 26, 2012	224	N/A

== Reception ==
Common Sense Media gave the show a 4 out of 5 stars.
