= Can You Teach My Alligator Manners? =

English television series

- Created by: Ethan Long
- Developed by: OddBott Inc.
- Written by: Robert C. Ramirez
- Directed by: Robert C. Ramirez
- Voices of: Colin Ford; Rob Paulsen
- Narrated by: Colin Ford
- Composer: Todd Kinnon
- Country of origin: United States
- No. of seasons: 2
- No. of episodes: 20

Production
- Running time: 2 minutes
- Production company: OddBot Inc.

Original release
- Network: Playhouse Disney
- Release: June 21, 2008 – October 24, 2009

Can You Teach My Alligator Manners? is an American animated children's series that aired on Disney Channel as part of its Playhouse Disney block. The show premiered on June 21, 2008, until October 24, 2009.

== Synopsis ==
A young boy named Mikey has a pet alligator named Al, and Mikey's mother says Mikey can't keep Al unless Al learns manners. Mikey enlists the help of the audience to teach Al manners in a variety of places and situations.

== Characters ==
- Mikey Goldman (voiced by Colin Ford)
- Al the Alligator (voiced by Rob Paulsen)

== Episodes ==
Season	Episodes	Originally released	
Season	Episodes	First released	Last released
1	10	June 21, 2008	August 30, 2008
2	10	August 22, 2009	October 24, 2009

=== Season 1 (2008) ===
No. overall	No. in season	Title	Original release date	Prod. code
1	1	"Playground Manners"	June 21, 2008	1CYTMAM01
2	2	"Good Sport Gator"	June 28, 2008	1CYTMAM02
3	3	"Nana's Visit"	July 5, 2008	1CYTMAM03
4	4	"Restaurant Manners"	July 12, 2008	1CYTMAM04
5	5	"Movie Manners"	July 19, 2008	1CYTMAM05
6	6	"Please and Thank You"	July 26, 2008	1CYTMAM06
7	7	"Birthday Manners"	August 2, 2008	1CYTMAM07
8	8	"Library Manners"	August 9, 2008	1CYTMAM08
9	9	"Get Well Manners"	August 16, 2008	1CYTMAM09
10	10	"Classroom Manners"	August 30, 2008	1CYTMAM10

=== Season 2 (2009) ===
No. overall	No. in season	Title	Original release date	Prod. code
11	1	"Babysitting Manners"	August 22, 2009	2CYTMAM01
12	2	"Nature Park Manners"	August 29, 2009	2CYTMAM02
13	3	"Museum Manners"	September 5, 2009	2CYTMAM03
14	4	"Carnival Manners"	September 12, 2009	2CYTMAM04
15	5	"Airplane Manners"	September 19, 2009	2CYTMAM05
16	6	"Elevator Manners"	September 26, 2009	2CYTMAM06
17	7	"Family Meal Manners"	October 3, 2009	2CYTMAM07
18	8	"Swimming Pool Manners"	October 10, 2009	2CYTMAM08
19	9	"Supermarket Manners"	October 17, 2009	2CYTMAM09
20	10	"TV Time Manners"	October 24, 2009	2CYTMAM10
