= Tasty Time with ZeFronk =

American animated series

- Title card featuring Sue on left, ZeFronk on right
- Created by: Ethan Long
- Developed by: OddBot Inc.
- Directed by: Robert C. Ramirez
- Voices of: Rob Paulsen; Mark Hamill
- Opening theme: "Tasty Time with ZeFronk!" performed by Rob Paulsen and Mark Hamill
- Country of origin: United States
- No. of seasons: 2
- No. of episodes: 20

Production
- Executive producer: Ethan Long
- Running time: 3 minutes
- Production companies: Penn/Bright Entertainment (live action only); OddBot Inc.

Original release
- Network: Playhouse Disney
- Release: November 8, 2008 – September 24, 2010

Tasty Time with ZeFronk is an American animated short series produced for and aired on the Playhouse Disney block on Disney Channel from November 8, 2008, to September 24, 2010. Reruns aired on Playhouse Disney after the final episode of the series aired until February 13, 2011, when Playhouse Disney ended its run on Disney Channel. Reruns were later on moved to Disney Channel's Disney Junior block which debuted the next day at 6:00 AM Eastern Time. This animated short series is aimed at getting preschoolers to make their own snacks.

The series won a Daytime Emmy Award for Outstanding Special Class Short Format Daytime in 2011.

== Description ==
A French dachshund called ZeFronk hosts a cooking show from his doghouse with his assistant, a songbird named Sue, and his sneaky neighbor cat named Dom that always sneaks away snacks that ZeFronk makes, and each episode ends with ZeFronk chasing Dom around the prep counter, triggering Sue to fly away and come through the iris wipe. The first-season episodes ended with a bonus live-action segment in which a parent and child made the meal featured in the episode, although these segments were later removed due to time constraints.

== Characters ==
- Frankie "ZeFronk" (voiced by Rob Paulsen) is a French-accented Dachshund who has the talent of cooking.
- Sue is the assistant of ZeFronk. She is a songbird.
- Dom (voiced by Mark Hamill) is ZeFronk's naughty Tabby neighbor who often calls ZeFronk "Frankie" and always steals the food (better referred as sneakingly eating) that ZeFronk makes. He faces bad consequences in the end such as being chased around by ZeFronk.

== Episodes ==
=== Season 1 (2008) ===
1. "Dom's Tomato Surprise" (November 8, 2008)
2. "Dom's Fishing Trip" (November 8, 2008)
3. "Be Nice to Hot Cats Day" (November 8, 2008)
4. "The Surprise Package" (November 8, 2008)
5. "Dom-ercise" (November 8, 2008)
6. "Dom's Birthday" (November 8, 2008)
7. "Two Sues" (November 8, 2008)
8. "Cook Along with ZeFronk Contest (Ze Pancakes)" (November 8, 2008)
9. "Best Chef in the World Award" (November 8, 2008)
10. "Dom's Retirement" (November 8, 2008)

=== Season 2 (2010) ===
1. "Ze English Tea Sandwiches" (July 19, 2010).
2. "Ze Indian Mango Lassi" (July 22, 2010)
3. "Ze French Mini Quiche" (September 20, 2010)
4. "Ze Jamaican Coconut Banana Wheels" (September 20, 2010)
5. "Ze Chinese Chicken Salad" (September 21, 2010)
6. "Ze Italian Caprese Kabobs" (September 21, 2010)
7. "Ze German Potato Pancakes" (September 22, 2010)
8. "Ze Thai Watermelon Slush" (September 22, 2010)
9. "Ze Mexican Quesadilla" (September 23, 2010)
10. "Ze Greek Treat" (September 24, 2010)
