= Special Agent Oso =

American animated children's television series

- Genre: Preschool
- Created by: Ford Riley
- Directed by: Jamie Mitchell
- Voices of: Sean Astin; Meghan Strange; Gary Anthony Williams; Phill Lewis; Amber Hood; Cam Clarke; Jess Harnell
- Theme music composer: Ford Riley and Mike Himelstein
- Composers: Mike Himelstein and Michael Turner
- Country of origin: United States
- Original language: English
- No. of seasons: 2
- No. of episodes: 60 (117 segments) (list of episodes)

Production
- Executive producer: Ford Riley
- Editor: Pieter Kaufman
- Running time: 24 minutes
- Production company: Disney Television Animation

Original release
- Network: Playhouse Disney
- Release: April 4, 2009 – January 24, 2011
- Network: Disney Junior (Note: As part of the Playhouse Disney programming block, later Disney Junior.)
- Release: February 14, 2011 – May 17, 2012

Special Agent Oso is an American animated preschool television series created by Ford Riley for Playhouse Disney, which renamed to Disney Jr. in 2011. It features Oso, an anthropomorphic panda who is a special agent working for the United Network for Investigating Quite Usual Events (UNIQUE), an agency dedicated to helping children with everyday tasks such as mailing a letter, riding a bike, or making a sandwich. The series debuted on April 4, 2009 and ended on May 17, 2012. The series had a total of 60 episodes over two seasons.

The series received generally positive reviews from critics, and was nominated for Outstanding Original Song at the 2010 Daytime Emmy Awards. Both Special Agent Oso along with its spin-off, Special Agent Oso: Three Healthy Steps, which aired during interstitials, are available to stream on Disney+.

== Premise ==
Each episode begins with Oso performing a training exercise given to him by one of his three instructors, Wolfie, Dotty, or Buffo. During the exercise, a Shutterbug drone notices a child struggling to complete a simple task that is related to Oso's assignment. Before or after Oso fails his training exercise, Paw Pilot, Oso's computerized assistant, alerts him about a special assignment, and she, along with Mr. Dos, his boss, illustrates his client's plight and assigns him a mission to help the child complete the task. To do so, Paw Pilot provides Oso with "three special steps", a simplified step-by-step guide to completing the task, while Mr. Dos gives Oso a briefing on the child's problem. Oso is transported to the child's location and attempts to follow the steps; Paw Pilot also gives further elaborations, including a trick which reveals the mistake he made during the training exercise. During the third and final step, Paw Pilot generally senses the time limit on the task and begins counting down as the time limit approaches. Oso and the child typically complete the task at the end of the countdown. The completion of all three steps often involves gadgets, such as a pen that can become a grappling device and a jetpack.

After returning from the assignment, the helpful trick given during the assignment turns out to be the same trick Oso needed to complete the training exercise, which he completes and passes, earning a "digi-medal" for the training exercise (in Season 1 only) and the special assignment.

== Episodes ==
Season	Segments	Episodes		Originally released		
Season	Segments	Episodes		First released	Last released	Network
1	48	24		April 4, 2009	April 17, 2010	Playhouse Disney
2	30	36	16	May 6, 2010	January 24, 2011	Playhouse Disney
2	36	36	20	February 14, 2011	May 17, 2012	Disney Junior
Three Healthy Steps	—N/a	15 (spin-off)		February 14, 2011	March 7, 2011	Disney Junior

=== Format ===
Each episode has four components:

- The training exercises are Oso's training task, which Wolfie, Dotty or Buffo assign. Oso invariably makes a mistake on his first attempt, but while doing the special assignments, he refers to the mistake he made in his training exercise. He then returns to his training exercise and does it properly on his second attempt, then earns a "Digi-Medal" (only in Season 1).
- The special assignments are missions that Mr. Dos requests Oso to help a child in need. After completing the assignment by using the Three Special Steps, he earns a "Digi-Medal".
- The Three Special Steps are the steps that Paw Pilot gives Oso to follow when on his special assignments.
- Audience participation or interaction with Oso. Oso often asks the audience to help him. Sometimes, Oso will ask the audience to help him find something hidden or missing on the screen. Other times, Oso will ask the audience to try something physically demanding that he is doing.

== Characters ==
=== Main ===
- Special Agent Oso (voiced by Sean Astin) is an anthropomorphic panda who works for U.N.I.Q.U.E. to help children perform tasks. His name is derived from oso, the Spanish word for bear.
- Paw Pilot (voiced by Meghan Strange) is Oso's computerized assistant, who guides him through three special steps he needs to accomplish his mission. Her name is a reference to the Palm Pilot series of handheld computers.
- Mr. Dos (voiced by Gary Anthony Williams) is the leader of U.N.I.Q.U.E. and Oso's smartwatch boss, who assigns him missions.
- Special Agent Wolfie (voiced by Phill Lewis) is an anthropomorphic wolf that regularly oversees Oso's training.
- Special Agent Dotty (voiced by Amber Hood) is an anthropomorphic cat that also regularly oversees Oso's training.
- Professor Buffo (voiced by Brad Garrett and later Jess Harnell) is a clumsy and excitable Italian-speaking anthropomorphic bison who invents Oso's gadgets, as well as overseeing Oso's training.
- Whirly Bird (voiced by Cam Clarke) is Oso's bird-shaped autogyro who takes Oso to wherever someone needs help. He often misunderstands what Oso tells him, usually leading to Oso's ejection at inopportune moments and places.
- R.R. Rapide (voiced by Cam Clarke) is Oso's French-speaking train. Though his French accent would suggest a TGV, He is likely a reference to the Fastech 360, based on his shape and retractable speedbrake ears.
- Special Agent Musa is an anthropomorphic silent dark brown squirrel who is a ninja; master of stealth and speed.
- Shutterbugs are ladybug-shaped robotic cameras that keeps an eye out for children who need help.

=== Guest voices ===
- Madison Davenport as Stacy/Fiona
- Grace Rolek as Molly/Sophie
- Khamani Griffin as Danny/Aaron/Paulie
- Maria Celeste as Samantha
- Kara R. Stribling as Abby/Jessica
- Isabella Murad as Sally/Cassie/Michelle/Anna/Audrey
- Colin Ford as Joe/David
- Sekai Murashige as Jack/Jennethan
- Ciara Bravo as Sarah
- Billy Unger as Michael/Quinn
- Kurt Doss as Dawson/Austin/Logan
- Kimberly Brooks as Grace
- Kristen Combs as Caroline/Aaliyah/Avery
- Quinton Lopez as Jim
- Juliette Alba as Olivia
- Jack Samson as Ben/Nathan
- Harrison Fahn as Jake/Oliver/Anthony
- Isabella Acres as Jade/Mia #1
- Madison Pettis as Katie/Tara
- John Devito as Sam/Theo
- Fiona Riley as Addison/Maya
- Church Lieu as Frank/Ivan
- Jillian Henry as Brianna
- Stefanie Scott as Emma
- Hynden Walch as Hailey
- Nina Barry as Nicole
- Jacob Bertrand as Spencer
- Tiffany Espensen as Joon Kim/Carina
- Élan Garfias as Cody/Grayson/Jose/Eric
- Luke Manriquez as Carlos
- Kwesi Boakye as Andrew
- Diane HSU as Min/Meehwa
- Firoozeh Adli as Makayla/Marie/Faith
- Zachary Gordon as Tyler/Rasheed
- Kailey Swanson as Ashley
- Jelani Imani as William/Joshua/Dylan
- Avion Baker as Natalie/Nadia/Charlotte
- Abby Weiss as Lisa
- Nancy Kim as Jennifer
- Luke Davis as Gavin
- Zachary Michael as Johnny
- Brianna McCracken as Alexis
- Cameron Escalante as Chloe
- Sabre Jacobs as Kaylee
- Parish Allen as Lizzie
- Vanessa Millsaps as Lily
- Coleen Crabtree as Leila
- Raymond Ochoa as Noah
- Ryan Christopher Lee as Noh Yoon/Nicholas/Liam/Charlie
- Rico Rodriguez as Lin/Xavier/Marco/Brandon
- Jacob Medrano as Alberto
- Sayeed Shahidi as Evan
- Liberty Smith as Madison/Lena
- Alec Gray as Dimitri
- Caitlin Carmichael as Athena
- Jet Jurgensmeyer as Rudy/Gabriel/Aiden
- Maxim Knight as David #2
- Wilmer Valderrama as Handy Manny
- Nika Futterman as Stretch & Squeeze
- Carlos Alazraqui as Felipe
- Dee Bradley Baker as Turner
- Tom Kenny as Pat
- Fred Stoller as Rusty
- Kath Soucie as Dusty
- Grey DeLisle as Flicker
- Nancy Truman as Kelly
- Erica Luttrell as Dylan and Sophie's moms
- Jennifer Aquino as Ashley #1
- William Cwammendi as Wontwo

=== Additional voices ===
- Lou Holtz as Uncle Lou (character was modeled to look like himself)
- Rob Paulsen as Cassie's Dad/Dawson's Dad/Emma's Dad
- Gwendoline Yeo as Jack's Mom
- Maria Canals as Cody's Mom
- James Sie as Joon Kim's Dad
- Colleen O'Shaughnessey as Jade's Mom/Jake's Mom/Nadia's Mom
- Sarah Chalke as David's Mom
- Jeannie Elias as Michael's Mom/Quinn's Mom
- Jim Cummings as Joe's Dad/Andrew's Dad
- Kevin Michael Richardson as Andrew's Grandfather
- James Arnold Taylor as Mr. Thompson
- Lucas Grabeel as Uncle Eric
- Mel Brooks as Grandpa Mel
- Malcolm-Jamal Warner as Brayden's Dad
- Kimberly Brooks as Andrew's Grandmother/Andrew's Mom/Caroline's Mom

== Broadcast ==
The first season of Special Agent Oso premiered in the United States and United Kingdom on April 4, 2009, and aired through April 17, 2010. The second and final season premiered on July 10, 2010, and the series finale aired May 17, 2012. In season 2, new characters, Professor Buffo and Special Agent Musa, were introduced. The show has a crossover with Handy Manny called "The Manny with the Golden Bear".

== Reception ==
=== Critical response ===
Hannah Johnson of Screen Rant found the character of Dotty to be a positive role model, writing, "It is evident that she has worked hard to get where she is, being the only female supervisor in an androcentric career, where all her colleagues are men. The orange cat has a fun and giggly personality, her favorite color is pink, and she likes visiting space as part of her missions. Dotty is a complex character succeeding in a man's world." Emily Ashby of Common Sense Media gave Special Agent Oso a grade of four out of five stars, praised the messaging and role models, citing resourcefulness and perseverance, and complimented the presence of educational value in the show, saying, "Age-appropriate skills like shape recognition, chronology, and spatial relationships are emphasized within the context of the plot, so kids learn while they enjoy the stories. The show's best quality is its positive message about the joy to be found in helping others."

=== Ratings ===
During April, Playhouse Disney UK saw its best weekly share among kids at 2.3%, a month that also had its best series launch with the preschool-targeted Special Agent Oso, which premiered on April 4 at 9:50 a.m. and attracted 377,000 viewers, including 181,000 kids aged four to 15.

=== Accolades ===
Year	Award	Category	Nominee(s)	Result	Ref.
2010	Daytime Emmy Awards	Outstanding Original Song	Mike Himelstein, Ford Riley	Nominated	
2012	Young Artist Awards	Best Performance in a Voice-Over Role - Young Actor	Jet Jurgensmeyer	Nominated	
2013	Young Artist Awards	Best Performance in a Voice-Over Role - Television - Young Actor	Jet Jurgensmeyer	Nominated	

== Spin-off ==
=== Special Agent Oso: Three Healthy Steps ===
Special Agent Oso: Three Healthy Steps is a short series that aired in the United States during the Disney Junior programming block. The spin-off premiered on February 14, 2011. It encourages children to use "three healthy steps" regarding eating, being healthy, and exercising. This series combined both animated characters and real life actors. The animated characters that are featured in the short series are Special Agent Oso, Paw Pilot, Special Agent Wolfie, Special Agent Dotty, and Professor Buffo.
