= Spookley the Square Pumpkin =

- DVD cover art
- Directed by: Bernie Denk
- Screenplay by: Tom Hughes
- Story by: Joe Troiano
- Based on: The Legend of Spookley the Square Pumpkin
- Produced by: Jeffrey Zahn; Mark Zander
- Starring: Sonja Ball
- Narrated by: Vlasta Vrána
- Edited by: Muvico
- Music by: Joe Troiano; Jeffrey Zahn
- Production companies: Holiday Hill Farm; Zander Productions; Oddvious Animation
- Distributed by: Kidtoon Films; Lionsgate
- Release date: October 19, 2004
- Running time: 47 minutes
- Country: Canada
- Language: English

Spookley the Square Pumpkin is a 2004 Canadian direct-to-video animated musical fantasy film about a geometric pumpkin based on the 2001 children's book The Legend of Spookley the Square Pumpkin by Joe Troiano. It was made by Holiday Hill Farm and released by Kidtoon Films and Lionsgate. The Honeydoos, three singing honeydews who sing in the style of The Pointer Sisters, are also featured. Bobby Pickett makes a brief cameo near the end of the film; his hit song "Monster Mash" is mentioned in one of the musical numbers "Transylvania Twist". Troiano and Zahn had previously written new music for Pickett's 1995 film adaptation of Monster Mash.

Spookley's Favorite Halloween Songs was released in 2012. Several Spookley the Square Pumpkin activity books were also released. A sequel, Spookley and the Christmas Kittens, was released on December 6, 2019, on Disney Junior. A 12-minute short The Spookley Easter Show was released on Disney Junior on April 8, 2022.

== Plot ==
Two bats who live at Holiday Hill Farm, bug-eating Boris and bug-loving vegetarian Bella, discover an unusual sight in the pumpkin patch and rush to inform the farm's scarecrow, Jack, of their find, which is a young, innocent pumpkin named Spookley, who is unusually square-shaped instead of round. Jack takes a liking to Spookley, but Little Tom, a small pumpkin attached by a vine to the much larger Big Tom, begins bullying and body shaming Spookley and claims that only round pumpkins are real pumpkins. Jack, however, immediately puts a stop to Little Tom's bullying.

Jack organizes the pumpkins in the patch to compete in the 'Jack-a-Lympics' contest, an athletic competition designed to determine the "Pick of the Patch". Three spiders named Edgar, Allan and Poe (after the famous author Edgar Allan Poe), who show superficial sympathy for Spookley, decide to help him in the Jack-a-Lympics just so they can help themselves to the prize, a crown made of candy corn. Throughout the competition, Big Tom and Little Tom are repeatedly disqualified for using their vine to give them an unfair advantage, leaving third-place finisher Bobo, a vain female pumpkin, to win most of the events. Spookley turns out to be a total failure at all the events, leaving him discouraged.

As Bobo is crowned the winner and the spiders abandon Spookley to help themselves to her crown, a severe wind storm hits the pumpkin patch, pushing the pumpkins all over and pinning Jack under a flaming tree branch. Spookley, because he is square, does not roll away when the wind hits him unlike the other pumpkins - and through some moments of ingenuity - rescues Jack from being burned alive and his fellow pumpkins from being washed away in the river. The other pumpkins express gratitude to Spookley for saving them, and he is hailed a hero.

After the storm, the farmer goes into the patch to assess the storm damage and discovers Spookley. The farmer is charmed by Spookley's unique shape and decides to make the square pumpkin his own personal jack-o'-lantern.

== Cast ==
- Sonja Ball as Spookley the Square Pumpkin / Other Honeydoos
- Vlasta Vrána as the Narrator
- Craig Francis as Jack the Scarecrow
- Rick Jones as Little Tom / Edgar
- Michel Perron as Big Tom
- Holly Gauthier-Frankel as Bella / Other Honeydoos
- Norman Groulx as Boris
- Terrence Scammell as Allan
- Bruce Dinsmore as Poe
- Jennifer Seguin as Bobo
- Kim Richardson as Lead Honeydoo
- Jayson Alonzo as various pumpkins

== Music ==
The Spookley the Square Pumpkin soundtrack was composed by Joe Troiano and released in October 2004. The album was produced by Jeffrey Zahn and Mark Zander. It includes "The Boo Song", recorded by Rick Jones, Terrence Scammell, and Bruce Dinsmore with lyrics by Zahn.

== Reception ==
Common Sense Media rated the film 4 out of 5 stars.

The website In the Playroom gave a positive review and called it an ideal Halloween film for younger audience. Another brief review underlined the fact that the film is associated with a campaign against bullying.

== See also ==
- List of films set around Halloween
