= Mickey's Tale of Two Witches =

2021 TV special for Mickey Mouse

- Promotional poster
- Genre: Animated; Adventure; Animation; Comedy
- Written by: Robert Ramirez
- Directed by: Jeff Gordon
- Starring: Bret Iwan; Bill Farmer; Daniel Ross; Tress MacNeille; Kaitlyn Robrock; Jim Cummings; Frank Welker; Nika Futterman; April Winchell
- Composers: Beau Black & David Goldsmith (songs); Tony Morales (underscore)
- Country of origin: United States
- Original language: English

Production
- Executive producers: Rob LaDuca; Mark Seidenberg
- Producer: Bradley Bowlen
- Editor: Reid Kramer
- Running time: 46 minutes
- Production company: Disney Television Animation

Original release
- Network: Disney Junior
- Release: October 7, 2021

Mickey's Tale of Two Witches is a Halloween television special that premiered on October 7, 2021 on Disney Junior. It is produced by Disney Television Animation. It is the first spin-off special of Mickey Mouse Mixed-Up Adventures before Mickey and Minnie Wish Upon a Christmas.

== Premise ==
On Halloween, Mickey tells Pluto a story about two witches-in-training, Minnie the Wonderful and Daisy Doozy, who must pass four tests to graduate from the Witch Academy in Happy Haunt Hills. While Daisy isn’t confident about passing, she and Minnie join forces, along with Count Mickula and the gang, to defeat a mischievous ghost. Minnie and Daisy learn that working together makes their magic and their friendship much stronger.

== Voice cast ==
- Bret Iwan as Mickey Mouse, Count Mickula
- Bill Farmer as Goofy, Franken-Goof, Pluto, Werewolfy Pluto
- Daniel Ross as Donald Duck, Mummy Donald
- Tress MacNeille as Daisy Duck, Daisy Doozy
- Kaitlyn Robrock as Minnie Mouse, Minnie the Wonderful Witch
- Jim Cummings as Pete, Pete the Ghost
- Frank Welker as Figaro, Butch the Bulldog
- Nika Futterman as Cuckoo-Loca, Spooky-Loca
- April Winchell as Clarabelle Cow, Witch Master Clarabelle
- Additional voices by Bill Farmer, Daniel Ross, and Frank Welker

== Songs ==
- "How to Witch" – sung by Daisy Doozy, Minnie the Wonderful Witch & Witch Master Clarabelle
- "The Fright Stuff" – sung by Pete the Ghost
- "Spooky Side" – sung by Daisy Doozy & Minnie the Wonderful Witch
- "Spooky Spirit" – sung by Count Mickula & the gang

== Release ==
Mickey's Tale of Two Witches premiered on October 7, 2021 on Disney Junior. The television special was subsequently released on DisneyNow. It was later made available to stream on Disney+ on October 8, 2021.

== Reception ==
=== Critical response ===
Kristy Ambrose of TheGamer named Mickey's Tale of Two Witches one of the best Disney Halloween films. She said that the movie is a sweet tale featuring two beloved Disney characters, noting the fun of seeing familiar faces in magical attire. Ambrose praised its suitability for younger viewers due to its 47-minute runtime as an official entry in the Disney Junior library. She found the story engaging, as it follows Minnie the Wonderful and Daisy Doozy training at the Witch Academy in Happy Haunt Hills, emphasizing that magic is more effective when friendship is the main ingredient. Lauren Phillips of Real Simple stated that Mickey's Tale of Two Witches is a "super sweet" choice for families with young children. She described it as the "perfect" Halloween show to watch for the event.

Larry Stansburry and Cameron Jenkins of Good Housekeeping listed Mickey's Tale of Two Witches in their best Disney Halloween movies and said that the film is ideal for kids, as it features Minnie and Daisy undertaking four tests to graduate as real witches. They noted the television special for highlighting the importance of teamwork and stated that it ultimately strengthens both the characters' friendship and their magical abilities. Casey Suglia and Sydni Ellis of Romper included Mickey's Tale of Two Witches 39th in their list of the best Halloween films on Disney+, calling the Halloween special "cute," and wrote, "It features fun songs, magic spells, a mischevious [sic] ghost, and plenty of Halloween fun."

=== Ratings ===
On its premiere airing on Disney Junior on October 2021 at 7:00 p.m., Mickey's Tale of Two Witches was watched by 0.35 million viewers. The special was rebroadcast the following day on Disney Channel at 9:30 a.m., drawing 0.30 million viewers. On October 7, 2022, the program premiered again with 135,000 total viewers (P2+) and a 0.04% rating, including 39,100 viewers aged 18–49 (0.03% rating). By October 12, viewership had increased to 246,000 total viewers (0.08% rating), with 78,300 in the 18–49 demographic (0.06% rating), marking an 82% increase in total viewership compared to the earlier 2022 broadcast.

=== Accolades ===
Mickey's Tale of Two Witches was nominated for Best One-Off, Special or TV Movie: Preschool at the 2023 Kidscreen Awards.

== In other media ==
=== Books ===
In July 2023, Disney Publishing Worldwide released a book inspired by the television special titled Mickey’s Tale of Two Witches.
