= Mickey Mouse Funhouse =

American animated children's television series

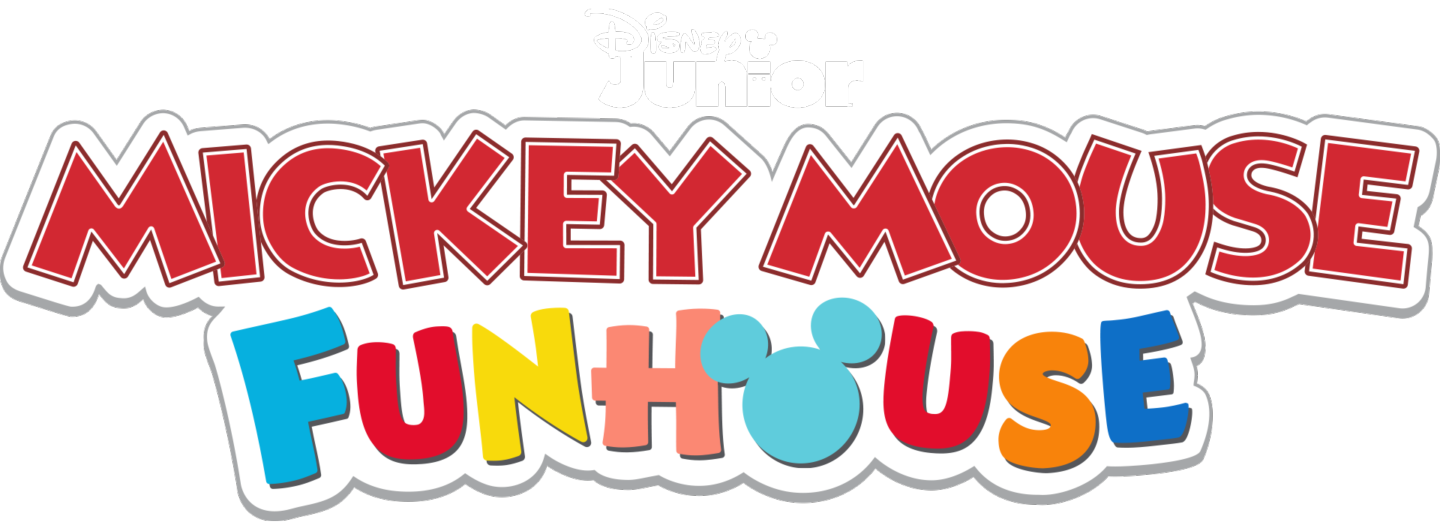
- Also known as: Disney Junior: Mickey Mouse Funhouse
- Genre: Educational; Comedy; Adventure; Fantasy
- Created by: Phil Weinstein; Thomas Hart
- Based on: Mickey Mouse & Friends by Walt Disney & Ub Iwerks; Mickey Mouse Clubhouse by Bobs Gannaway
- Directed by: Kelly Ward (dialogue director)
- Voices of: Bret Iwan; Kaitlyn Robrock; Tony Anselmo; Tress MacNeille (season 1); Debra Wilson (seasons 2–3); Bill Farmer; Harvey Guillén; Corey Burton; Jim Cummings; Jan Johns; Nika Futterman; Brock Powell; April Winchell
- Theme music composer: Beau Black
- Opening theme: "Mickey Mouse Funhouse Main Title Theme", written by Beau Black & Loren Hoskins
- Ending theme: "Stretch Break" (Instrumental)
- Composers: Beau Black & Loren Hoskins (songs); Natsumi Osawa (score); Scotty Nguyen (choreographer of Stretch Break)
- Country of origin: United States
- Original language: English
- No. of seasons: 3
- No. of episodes: 86 (list of episodes)

Production
- Executive producers: Phil Weinstein; Thomas Hart
- Producers: Bradley Bowlen; Steve Walby
- Running time: 22–24 minutes (11 minutes per segment)
- Production company: Disney Television Animation (Note: Animation outsourced to Technicolor Animation Productions (season 1) and Mikros Animation (seasons 2–3))

Original release
- Network: Disney Jr.
- Release: July 16, 2021 – April 25, 2025

Related
- Mickey Mouse Clubhouse (2006–2016) Mickey Mouse Mixed-Up Adventures (2017–2021) Mickey Mouse Clubhouse+ (2025–present) Minnie's Bow-Toons (2011–2016; 2021–present) Me & Mickey (2022–present)

Mickey Mouse Funhouse is an American animated preschool children's television series created by Phil Weinstein and Thomas Hart and is the successor to Mickey Mouse Clubhouse and Mickey Mouse Mixed-Up Adventures. The series debuted on Disney Jr. on August 20, 2021. In October 2021, the series was renewed for a second season which premiered on November 4, 2022. In June 2022, the series was renewed for a third season which premiered on February 23, 2024.

Disney Jr. created the series to continue its pattern of original pre-school animated series set within the Mickey Mouse universe. Many key members of the creative team of Mickey Mouse Clubhouse and Mickey Mouse Mixed-Up Adventures developed the series.

== Premise ==
Mickey Mouse, along with Minnie Mouse, Donald Duck, Daisy Duck, Goofy and sometimes Pluto, meet Funny, an enchanted and energetic talking funhouse who resides in the Funhouse Forest outside of Hot Dog Hills, alongside his pet doghouse Teddy and a sentient weathervane named Windy.

After Mickey and his friends (who are sometimes referred to as the "Funhouse Friends") climb the Stairs to Anywhere, Funny magically transports them from the Adventure Doors to a range of Adventure Worlds which allows them to embark on adventures unique to the Adventure Worlds that include but aren't limited to Majestica, Sunny Gulch, Halloweenville, the Adventure Sea Islands, the Land of Myth and Legend, and Herotropolis as they assume the outfits associated with each of the Adventure Worlds. It is in these Adventure Worlds where they also meet its inhabitants and alter-egos of characters they know. In addition, they also learn some morals regarding the episode's content as Funny would manifest a trophy to remember their trip afterwards.

Every episode includes one or two dance breaks. With the exception of half-hour specials, there is a "Stretch Break" dance that occurs in between the two segments of the episodes. At the end of each episode including the specials, the characters dance along to the "Wiggle Giggle" song.

== Characters ==
=== Main ===
- Mickey Mouse (voiced by Bret Iwan) is the leader of the Funhouse Friends.
- Minnie Mouse (voiced by Kaitlyn Robrock) is a kind-hearted member and loves making buttons and bows.
- Figaro (vocal effects provided by Frank Welker) is Minnie's pet cat. The episode ''Goldfish Goofy".
  - Cream Puff (vocal effects provided by Jan Johns) is Minnie's pet puppy.
- Donald Duck (voiced by Tony Anselmo) is a short-tempered but good-natured member. A running gag after a trip to one of the Adventure Worlds has him ejected from a nearby pipe.
- Daisy Duck (voiced by Tress MacNeille in season 1, Debra Wilson in seasons 2–3) is a fun-crafted member and loves playing games with her friends.
- Lil' Stinker (vocal effects provided by Dee Bradly Baker) is Donald's pet skunk. The episode ''Goldfish Goofy".
- Goofy (voiced by Bill Farmer) is the dimwitted one of the Funhouse Friends. A running gag after a trip to one of the Adventure Worlds is that he would be given a brief ride when his backpack gets hooked up on the backpack hanger. The episode "Clarabelle's Pie Dilemma" revealed that Goofy is allergic to bananas enough that they make him very itchy.
- Goldie (vocal effects provided by Jan Johns) is Goofy's pet goldfish. The episode ''Goldfish Goofy".
- Pluto (vocal effects provided by Bill Farmer) is Mickey's pet dog. Unlike the rest of the Sensastional Six, he is absent in certain episodes. In some later episodes, Pluto would take the Pet Adventure Door to specific Adventure Worlds. Farmer also voices Pluto's speaking voice during Daisy's dream in the episode "Daisy and the Missing Dream".
- Funny (voiced by Harvey Guillén) is an enchanted talking funhouse living in the Funhouse Forest who can take anyone to any of the Adventure Worlds upon the Funhouse Friends going up the Stairs to Anywhere and entering one of the Adventure Doors to a specific Adventure World. Funny can also change his shape and appearance to match the new surroundings and project his face on any surface to speak with anyone. When it comes to either traveling on the road, going to Outer Space or flying to another country, Funny will shapeshift into a mode of transportation as the Funhouse Friends enter the Adventure Door associated with the vehicle form in question. The episode "Homesick" reveals that Funny is allergic to sunflowers.
  - Teddy (vocal effects provided by Brock Powell) is a sentient dog-faced doghouse who is Funny's pet and is good friends with Pluto. He sometimes accompanies the Funhouse Friends to any of the Adventure Worlds. Teddy is also shown to have shapeshifting abilities where he can also reassemble himself if he ends up disassembled. In some later episodes, Teddy would take the Pet Adventure Door to specific Adventure Worlds.
  - Windy (vocal effects provided by Jan Johns) is a sentient weathervane who is often on top of Funny. It operates the Whirly Coaster at Funport Station that takes Mickey and his friends to and from Funny.

=== Recurring ===
- Pete (voiced by Jim Cummings) is a friend of the Funhouse Friends who works as a postmaster. He is shown to have different alter-egos in the different Adventure Worlds (e.g. in Majestica, he is a farmer named Farmer Pete; in Sunny Gulch, he is a cowboy named Cowboy Pete and a train conductor; in the Land of Myth and Legend, he is a king and demigod hero named Pete the Mighty who can shoot lightning; in Sportstopia, he is a top baseball player named Powerhouse Pete, who runs the Pete's Palookas baseball team that consists of other Pete alter-egos; in Undersea Ocean World, he is Octo-Pete, who has octopus tentacles for legs; in Halloweenville, he is its Frankenstein's monster-resembling mayor named Mayor Franken-Pete who runs on batteries and speaks in the style of Boris Karloff; in Outer Space, he is Asteroid Pete who is the proprietor of the Amazing Cave of Amazement (later called Asteroid Pete's Fun Center); in Musicville, he is Polyphonic Pete; in the Adventure Sea Islands, he is Mickey's old friend Piccolo Pete).
- Chip (voiced by Tress MacNeille in season 1, Jan Johns in seasons 2–3) and Dale (voiced by Corey Burton) are two chipmunks. They are shown to have different alter-egos on different Adventure Worlds. In the Land of Myth and Legend, they are pizzeria owners Cheesy Chip and Pepperoni Dale. In Sportstopia, they are athletes named Champion Chip and Dynamo Dale. In Halloweenville, they are lab assistants named Fritz Chip and Igor Dale. In Outer Space, they are space surfers Star Surfer Chip and Wave Rider Dale. In Sunny Gulch, they are two cowboys. In India, they are expert Bollywood dancers Kulfi Chip and Mishti Dale.
- Ludwig Von Drake (voiced by Corey Burton) is a scientist. He is shown to have different alter-egos on different Adventure Worlds. In Majestica, he is its ruler named King Ludwig. In Herotropolis, he is a scientist who contributed a lot of scientific inventions. In Halloweenville, he is a mad scientist named Kooky Scientist Ludwig Von Drake. In Musicville, he is a pianist named Ludwig Von Drakenhoven. In Magic Movie Land, he is a film director named Director Von Drake.
- Clarabelle Cow (voiced by April Winchell) is a friend of Minnie and Daisy who is shown to be a baker and plumber by trade. She is shown to have different alter-egos on different Adventure Worlds. In Majestica, she is a pie shop proprietor named Lady Clarabelle. In Sunny Gulch, she is Mayor Clarabelle. In Razzle Dazzle Dunes, she is a merchant named Trader Clarabelle. In Herotropolis, she is a superhero named Captain Clarabelle. In Sportstopia, she is a volleyball player. In the Land of Myth and Legend, she is a witch named Care-abelle who lives in the Forest Primeval. In the Adventure Sea Islands, she is a buccaneer named Buccaneer Belle. In Outer Space, she is the Lunar Lunch Box proprietor named Lunar Clarabelle. In Magic Movie Land, she is a camera operator.
- Horace Horsecollar (voiced by Bill Farmer) is shown to have different alter-egos on different Adventure Worlds. In Sportstopia, he is an umpire, a stable boy, and a tap dance instructor. In Herotropolis, he is a trash collector. In Sunny Gulch, he is a cowboy. In Majestica, he's an ironsmith named Ironsmith Horace.
- Mortimer Mouse (voiced by Maurice LaMarche) is a mouse. Unlike past incarnations, Mortimer isn't shown to have a rivalry with Mickey here. He sometimes accompanies Mickey and his friends to the different Adventure Worlds and often ends up in situations that Mickey would have to help get him out of.
- Cuckoo-Loca (voiced by Nika Futterman) is a wind-up yellow cuckoo. She is shown to have different alter-egos on different Adventure Worlds. In Majestica, she is an innkeeper named Inkeeper Cuckoo-Loca who runs Shirehaven's inn. In Sportstopia, she is a referee named Referee Cuckoo-Loca. In the Adventure Sea Islands, she is First Mate Cuckoo-Loca who works for Buccaneer Belle.
- Hilda (voiced by April Winchell) is a hippopotamus. She is shown to have different alter-egos on different Adventure Worlds. In Majestica, she is a fairy named Fairy Hilda/Hibiscus Hilda who resides in the fairy square garden. In Sunny Gulch, she is a café owner. In Sportstopia, she is a weight lifter and a ballet instructor. In Herotropolis, she is a trash collector. In Razzle Dazzle Dunes, she is a merchant named Merchant Hilda. In Winter Mountain, she is a Jewish inhabitant and an expert snowboarder. In India, she is a medu vada vendor.
- Willie the Giant (voiced by Will Ryan up until "Witchy Worries", Brock Powell starting with "Tooth or Consequences!") is a giant who lives in Majestica's Cloud Kingdom. In the Land of Myth and Legend, he is a lumberjack named Woodsman Willie. In the night sky, he is the constellation of Orion.
- The Weasel Trio is a group of weasels that are encountered on the different Adventure Worlds in different occupations like rival pirates in the Adventure Sea Islands, an outlaw gang in Sunny Gulch, jesters in Majestica, and a rock band called The Weaz-Tones in Musicville.
  - Wheezelene (voiced by Jenifer Lewis) is the leader of the Weasel Trio.
  - Cheezel (voiced by Richard Kind) is the shortest of the Weasel Trio.
  - Sneezel (voiced by Brock Powell) is the tallest of the Weasel Trio.
- The Funhouse Forest Gnomes is a group of gnomes who live in Funhouse Forest.
  - Pumpkin (voiced by Jan Johns) is a female gnome.
  - Olive (voiced by Kaitlyn Robrock) is a female gnome.
  - Fig is a male gnome who speaks through sign language which the other gnomes interpret.
  - Squash (voiced by Brock Powell) is a male gnome who is an expert at planting saplings.
- Crystal Clearwater (voiced by Sivan Alyra Rose) is a celebrity environmentalist.
- Ye Eun (voiced by Alice Lee) is a female cook in South Korea.
- Panchito Pistoles (voiced by Carlos Alazraqui) is a Mexican rooster who is part of The Three Caballeros with Donald.
- José Carioca (voiced by Sérgio Stern) is a Brazilian parrot who is part of The Three Caballeros with Donald. Stern, who also voices José in the Brazilian Portuguese dub, replaces Rob Paulsen, who voiced him alongside Alazraqui in House of Mouse and Mickey and the Roadster Racers, as Paulsen departed from the role in 2020 after stating he would no longer voice characters of color.
- Huey, Dewey, & Louie (voiced by Melissa Hutchison) are Donald's nephews. In Majestica, they are King Ludwig's grand-nephews known as Hueth, Deweth, and Loueth. The episode "Sitting Ducks" marks their first speaking appearances outside of the 2017 DuckTales reboot since the death of their previous voice actress Russi Taylor in 2019.

=== Characters in the Adventure Worlds ===
The following characters reside in each of the Adventure Worlds and are listed by their Adventure Worlds:

Residing in Majestica

- Farfus (vocal effects provided by Jan Johns) is a purple dragon that lives on Dragon Mountain. The episodes "Mickey the Brave" and "Minnie's One-of-a-Kind Picnic" revealed that corn makes Farfus sneeze.
  - Frannie (vocal effects provided by Jan Johns) is a young griffin who is Farfus' adopted little sister ever since her egg was adopted.
  - Gertie (voiced by Megan Statler in "Farfus' Family", Lizzie Freeman in "Frannie Takes Flight") is a female fairy who adopted Farfus and Frannie.
  - Grace (voiced by Kaitlyn Robrock in "Farfus' Family", Jan Johns in later appearances) is a female fairy who adopted Farfus and Frannie.
  - Gus (voiced by Tony Hale) is a male fairy who adopted Farfus and Frannie.
- Royal Troubadour (voiced by Rogelio Douglas Jr.) is a troubadour that is loyal to King Ludwig and sings about different things.
- Trolland (voiced by Kayvan Novak) is a short troll that lives under the bridge.
- Annie the Giant (voiced by Amanda Seales) is a giant and Willie the Giant's neighbor who lives in Majestica's Cloud Kingdom.
- Belle Canto (voiced by Ashley De La Rosa) is the new troubadour that works with the Royal Troubadour.

Residing in Winter Mountain

- Yeti (vocal effects provided by Dee Bradley Baker) is a cryptid. He is depicted as having a dog-like face and an ape-like body.
- Sunny (voiced by Jan Johns) is a snowman built from magical snow. He mostly says "snow".
  - Rosie (voiced by Kaitlyn Robrock) is a female snowman built from magical snow and mostly says "boom". Created as a friend for Sunny, Rosie was rough at playing up until Minnie set her straight. In "Santa's Crash Landing", Rosie and Sunny are living in the same snow house together with a pet snow-dog.
- Kyle (voiced by Ethan Monaghan) is a polar bear who is a friend of Yeti. He owns a plush toy penguin named Sonia.
- Snow Princess (voiced by Debra Wilson) is a cryokinetic princess who visits anyone's specially-made snow castle. It is said that wherever she goes, a blizzard will follow.

Residing in Outer Space

- Martian Mickey (voiced by Bret Iwan) is the Martian counterpart of Mickey who lives on the planet Mars.
  - Zoop Bloop (vocal effects provided by Daniel Ross) is a space blob who is Martian Mickey's pet.
- Martian Minnie (voiced by Kaitlyn Robrock) is the Martian counterpart of Minnie who lives on the planet Mars.
- Rocket Mouse (voiced by Jaime Camil) is a space adventurer and star of his own book series. Mickey is shown to be a fan of his work.
- Cosmo Cockroach (voiced by Kaitlyn Robrock) is a space cockroach and an opponent of Rocket Mouse who is known for taking other people's things up until Mickey and his friends set him straight. The episode "Let's Have Fun, Fun, Fun" revealed that Cosmo leads a musical group called Cosmo and the Beach Bugs.

Residing in the Enchanted Rainforest

- Pinky (vocal effects provided by Kaitlyn Robrock) is a baby mountain gorilla that resides with his parents.

Residing in Prehistoric World

- Tenille (vocal effects provided by Dee Bradley Baker) is a Triceratops.
  - T-Top (vocal effects provided by Dee Bradley Baker) is a baby Triceratops and child of Tenille who Pluto and Teddy befriend.
  - Tilly (vocal effects provided by Dee Bradley Baker) is a baby Triceratops who is Tenille's child and T-Top's younger sister.
- Hal (vocal effects provided by Brock Powell) is a Halszkaraptor. In his first appearance, Daisy mistook him for Donald up until she saw his full appearance.

Residing in Sunny Gulch

- Wanda Warbler (voiced by Mickey Guyton) is a country music star. Wanda earned the nickname "The Wanderin' Warbler" because of her habit of wandering off to different areas without letting people know where she is going.

Residing in the Land of Myth and Legend

- The Minotaur (voiced by Jim Cummings) is a part-human part-bull inhabitant.
- The Muses are the inspirational goddesses of literature, science and the arts. These Muses are the same ones from Hercules and its related projects.
  - Calliope (voiced by Lillias White, understudied by Caroline Taylor in "The Adventure Parade") is a Muse who presides over poetry.
  - Thalia (voiced by Roz Ryan) is a Muse who presides over comedy.
- Saiya (voiced by Artt Butler) is a short Mayan hero who comes from the Mayan part of the Land of Myth and Legend.
- Cho Sook (voiced by Jee Young Han) is a North Korean shapeshifter who resides in the Korean part of the Land of Myth and Legend and can turn into a nine-tailed fox.
- The Dokkaebi (vocal effects provided by Jee Young Han) are a race of Korean goblins that live in the Korean part of the Land of Myth and Legend.
- Bast (voiced by Yasmine Al Massri) is a cat-headed goddess who lives in the Egyptian part of the Land of Myth and Legend.
- Kyung Won (voiced by Alan Kim) is a young Siberian tiger living in the Korean part of the Land of Myth and Legend.

Residing in Underwater Ocean World

- Seabiscuit (voiced by Jan Johns) is a seahorse.
- Bubbles (voiced by Jan Johns) is a seahorse who is Seabiscuit's friend. She is also an experienced pet trainer.

Residing in the Adventure Sea Islands

- The Lost Socks are a group of sentient socks that reside on Lost and Found Island.
- Captain Salty Bones (voiced by John Stamos) is a skeleton pirate captain who resides on a pirate ship.
- Cora (voiced by Kate Micucci) is a giant crab who lives on Giant Crab Island.
- Captain Pepper Lemon (voiced by Yvette Nicole Brown) is a female pirate captain that resides on a pirate ship.
  - One Eye'd Jack (voiced by Brock Powell) is Salty Pepper's parrot companion.

Residing in Halloweenville

- Squeakers (vocal effects provided by Brock Powell) is a vampire bat. As Halloweenville has no phone system, Squeakers is used to travel to Funny when enlisting the Funhouse Friends on someone's behalf.
- Trikini (voiced by Jorjeana Marie) is a magical rabbit.

== Episodes ==
Season	Episodes	Originally released	
Season	Episodes	First released	Last released
1	26	July 16, 2021	October 7, 2022
2	30	November 4, 2022	January 26, 2024
3	30	February 23, 2024	April 25, 2025

== Production ==
=== Development ===
Mickey Mouse Funhouse begun production in 2020 to premiere on the network Disney Jr. in 2021. Produced by Disney Television Animation, the series was developed by executive producer Phil Weinstein, as well as co-executive producer Thomas Hart, and story editor Mark Drop, who had previously worked on Mickey Mouse Mixed-Up Adventures as part of the creative team. The new series introduced an additional character, Funny. Each episode of the series features two 11-minute stories separated by a regular "dance break" interlude. On October 19, 2021, Disney Jr. renewed the series for a second season. On June 15, 2022, it was renewed for a third season. On April 21, 2025, Kaitlyn Robrock, the current voice of Minnie Mouse, confirmed that the series would end after three seasons.

=== Casting ===
The cast from the previous show includes Bret Iwan, Bill Farmer, Kaitlyn Robrock (replacing Russi Taylor due to her death in 2019), Tress MacNeille, and Tony Anselmo reprising their roles as Mickey, Goofy and Pluto, Minnie, Daisy, and Donald, respectively. Joining them is Harvey Guillén, voicing the character Funny, an enchanted talking playhouse, among others. This show notably marked the last time that Will Ryan voiced Willie the Giant before his death in November 2021. Starting in 2023, Willie the Giant was voiced by Brock Powell. In Seasons 2 and 3, Debra Wilson and Jan Johns replaced Tress MacNeille as the voice of Daisy and Chip respectively, due to MacNeille becoming occupied with other projects.

=== Animation ===
Alan Bodner, who worked on Rapunzel's Tangled Adventure, serves as the series' art director. For his direction of "Mickey the Brave!", Bodner stated that he drew inspiration from The Mickey Mouse Club, recalling the colourful and imaginative sets. The animation was also influenced by the colourful and fantastical artwork featured in Alice in Wonderland.

== Release ==
Mickey Mouse Funhouse premiered with a prime time special entitled "Mickey the Brave!" on July 16, 2021, on Disney Jr. This episode was released on Disney+ on July 23. It was also released on September 30, 2021, in Southeast Asia, but only lasted a day prior to the shutdown of the channel on October 1, 2021.

The full series premiered on August 20, 2021, with a simulcast on Disney Jr. and Disney Channel. The series was released on Disney+ on November 10, 2021. A prime time special entitled "Pirate Adventure" premiered on August 19, 2022, with a simulcast on Disney Jr. and Disney Channel.

The second season of the series premiered on November 4, 2022, with a simulcast on Disney Jr. and Disney Channel, later on Disney+ on January 18, 2023.

== Reception ==
=== Critical response ===
LaughingPlace.com emphasized that Mickey Mouse Funhouse provides "wholesome fun for the whole family", highlighting the engaging songs that encourage kids to dance and sing along. Marisa Lascala of Good Housekeeping included Mickey Mouse Funhouse in her list of the "60 Best Kids' TV Shows and Family Series of All Time". She also ranked it fifth in her "13 Best Toddler TV Shows". Lascala said that the series serves as a worthy successor to earlier shows like Mickey Mouse Clubhouse and Mickey Mouse Mixed-Up Adventures, praising the significant improvements in animation quality since Mickey Mouse Clubhouse debuted. She concluded that each episode concludes with a "wiggle giggle" song, allowing children to "shake their sillies out".

David Kaldor of Bubbleblabber rated the premiere episode 7/10, calling it a promising start to the series. He found the episode's message—about not judging others too quickly and understanding their behavior—to be an important lesson for young viewers. Kaldor praised its simple yet effective storytelling, noting that while the show is aimed at a very young audience, it delivers a meaningful takeaway in an engaging way. He also appreciated the playful, fantasy setting as an entertaining backdrop for these lessons. Joly Herman of Common Sense Media rated the series three out of five stars, noting its educational value and positive messages, particularly in terms of creativity and social-emotional lessons related to friendship, while also saying the show manages to be entertaining.

=== Ratings ===
Mickey Mouse Funhouse was watched by approximately 177,000 viewers daily, corresponding to a 0.06% rating among the audience aged 2 and older (P2+). This represented a 20% increase in viewership compared to May 3, 2024, when the daily audience was around 147,000 with a 0.05% rating. The key adult demographic (ages 18–49) accounted for approximately 65,900 viewers on June 7, 2024, with ratings generally fluctuating between 0.03 and 0.06 over the preceding months. Market research company Parrot Analytics, which looks at consumer engagement in consumer research, streaming, downloads, and on social media, reported that the series exhibited strong demand in December 2024, with audience demand 7.3 times the U.S. average. Despite a 38.6% decrease in demand during the month, the series' performance remained notable, ranking in the 93.5th percentile of the comedy genre. Mickey Mouse Funhouse continued to show strong demand as of January 2025, with audience engagement 6.2 times the U.S. average, placing it in the 92.1st percentile of the comedy genre. During the month, the show experienced a 15.9% increase in demand. Mickey Mouse Funhouse also demonstrated promise in international markets, including Switzerland and Australia.

== In other media ==
=== Miscellaneous ===
- In October 2021, Disney Publishing Worldwide published a picture book inspired by Mickey Mouse Funhouse titled Homesick. This was followed by Get Ready for Fun! in December 2021, and The Summer Snow Day in April 2022.
- On July 29, 2024, Happy Campers, a spin-off summer special of Mickey Mouse Funhouse, was released. During a camping trip with Funny, Mickey and his friends must help restore Orion the Hunter and other constellations after accidentally knocking them out of the sky.
