= Minnie's Bow-Toons =

Animated television show

- Genre: Educational; Comedy
- Based on: Minnie Mouse by Walt Disney; Ub Iwerks
- Developed by: Bobs Gannaway
- Voices of: Russi Taylor; Kaitlyn Robrock; Tress MacNeille; Avalon Robbins; Vivian Vencer; Stella Edwards; Nika Futterman; Frank Welker; April Winchell
- Composers: Mike Himelstein; Michael Turner; Beau Black
- Country of origin: United States
- Original language: English
- No. of seasons: 5 (original series); 4 (revival series)
- No. of episodes: 40 (original series); 80 (revival series); Total: 120

Production
- Executive producer: Rob LaDuca
- Producer: Mark Seidenberg
- Running time: approx. 2–5 minutes
- Production companies: Disney Television Animation (Note: Animation outsourced to DQ Entertainment (Clubhouse era Seasons), Mikros Animation (Mixed-up Adventures and Funhouse era seasons) and Icon Creative Studio Inc. (Pet Hotel)); Wild Canary Animation (Party Palace Pals Season 2/Camp Minnie)

Original release
- Network: Disney Junior
- Release: November 14, 2011 – January 22, 2016
- Network: Disney Jr.
- Release: April 5, 2021 – present

Related
- Mickey Mouse Clubhouse (2006–2016); Mickey Mouse Mixed-Up Adventures (2017–2021); Mickey Mouse Funhouse (2021–2025); Mickey Mouse Clubhouse+ (2025–present)

Minnie's Bow-Toons is an American animated preschool television series from Disney Television Animation. The series originally aired as a short-form series from November 14, 2011, to January 22, 2016, on Disney Jr. (as Disney Junior), and is a spin-off of Mickey Mouse Clubhouse. It is based on the Mickey Mouse Clubhouse episode "Minnie’s Bow-tique," in which Minnie Mouse opens the same boutique; in the spin-off, the setting is revisited with a focus on bows and bow ties. Minnie's Bow-Toons also introduces the character Cuckoo-Loca, as well as Minnie's twin nieces, Millie and Melody Mouse, who make their animated debut in the episode "Trouble Times Two."

Minnie's Bow-Toons was followed by a revival of the series, entitled Minnie's Bow-Toons: Party Palace Pals, which was released on April 3, 2021, on Disney Junior's YouTube channel and later aired its first episode on April 5 on Disney Channel, this time in the style of Mickey Mouse Mixed-Up Adventures, Mickey Mouse Funhouse and Mickey Mouse Clubhouse+ respectively.

== Premise ==
After the events of the Mickey Mouse Clubhouse episode "Minnie's Bow-tique", this TV series is about the adventures of Minnie Mouse and her best friend Daisy Duck as they run Minnie's Bow-tique, a speciality shop stocked only with colorful bows and bow-ties. Minnie ends all the Original Season 1 episodes saying, "There's no business like bow business!".

In Original Season 3, Minnie, Daisy and Cuckoo-Loca open a pet grooming salon adjacent to the Bow-tique. In Original Season 4 (as well as the ending of the Original Season 3), Minnie, Daisy and Cuckoo-Loca go on international trips, visiting cities like London, Paris, Venice and Tokyo. In Revival Season 1, Minnie, Daisy and Cuckoo-Loca start a new party planning business. In Revival Season 3, they go on all sorts of adventures while camping, and Revival Season 4 sees them starting up a pet hotel.

== Cast ==
=== Main ===
- Russi Taylor as Minnie Mouse (Original Season 1–5) and Bow-Bot
- Kaitlyn Robrock as Minnie Mouse (Revival Season 1–present), Mrs. Porkins, Clara Cluck
- Tress MacNeille as Daisy Duck, Chip, Penelope Poodle, Animal Trainer, the Queen of England
- Nika Futterman as Cuckoo-Loca, Paparazzi Reporter and Baby Oinky

=== Recurring ===
- April Winchell as Clarabelle Cow
- Frank Welker as Figaro, Pizza Restaurant Diner #2, Gilbert the Guinee Pig
- Avalon Robbins as Millie Mouse and Melody Mouse (Original Season 1–5)
- Vivian Vencer and Stella Edwards as Millie and Melody Mouse respectively (Revival Season 1–present)
- Bret Iwan as Mickey Mouse
- Tony Anselmo as Donald Duck
- Bill Farmer as Goofy, Pluto, Penguini the Magnificent, Singing Ghosts, Delivery Men, Hot Dog Vendor at the Pet Adoption, Luigi the Pizza Shop Owner, Kabuki Theater Manager, TV Announcer, Mr. Gander and Mayor McBeagle
- Dee Bradley Baker as Gus Goose, Wormy, Animal Vocalist
- Corey Burton as Ludwig von Drake, Dale
- Max Charles as Joey Beaver (Original Season 1–5)
- Jecobi Swain as Joey Beaver (Revival Season 1–2)
- Ariel Winter as Roxie Squirrel
- Leslie Uggams as Nana Beaver
- Andrea Libman as Trixie the Goat
- Daniel Ross as Donald Duck (Archive Footage only)
- Carlos Alazraqui as Panchito Pistoles
- Jane Leeves as Queen Elizabeth II
- Grace Kaufman as Chloe Bunny, Posey Bear, Emmy Mouse

== Episodes ==
=== Series overview ===
Season	Era	Episodes	Originally released	
Season	Era	Episodes	First released	Last released
1	Original	10	November 14, 2011	February 14, 2012
2	Original	10	November 12, 2012	February 5, 2013
3	Original	10	November 7, 2013	February 13, 2014
4	Original	7	February 20, 2014	January 22, 2015
5	Original	3	January 22, 2016	
1	Revival	20	April 5, 2021	March 25, 2022
2	Revival	20	May 23, 2022	October 8, 2022
3	Revival	20	June 21, 2023	September 30, 2024
4	Revival	20	May 19, 2025	September 28, 2026

== Original series (2011–2016) ==
=== Season 1 (2011–2012) ===
No. overall	No. in season	Title	Original release date	Prod. code
1	1	"Leaky Pipes"	November 14, 2011	101
2	2	"The Pom-Pom Problem"	November 15, 2011	102
3	3	"Trouble Times Two"	November 16, 2011	103
4	4	"Figaro's Friend"	November 17, 2011	104
5	5	"A Shop in the Dark"	November 18, 2011	105
6	6	"Flower Fix"	November 19, 2011	106
7	7	"Dance Lessons"	December 2, 2011	107
8	8	"In Plane Sight"	December 10, 2011	108
9	9	"Bow-Bot"	December 17, 2011	109
10	10	"Fashion Emergency"	February 14, 2012	110

=== Season 2 (2012–2013) ===
No. overall	No. in season	Title	Original release date	Prod. code
11	1	"Piano Movers and Shakers"	November 12, 2012	111
12	2	"A Good Sign"	November 19, 2012	112
13	3	"Locked Out"	November 26, 2012	113
14	4	"Feelin' Crabby"	December 3, 2012	114
15	5	"Cuckoo-Loca's Egg-celent Adventure"	December 10, 2012	115
16	6	"Funny Bunny"	January 7, 2013	116
17	7	"Weather or Not"	January 14, 2013	117
18	8	"Mechanical Mayhem"	January 21, 2013	118
19	9	"Adventures in Piggy Sitting"	January 28, 2013	119
20	10	"Minnie's Makeover Madness"	February 5, 2013	120

=== Season 3 (2013–2014) ===
No. overall	No. in season	Title	Original release date	Prod. code
21	1	"Tricky Treats"	November 7, 2013	201
22	2	"Pet Adoption"	November 14, 2013	202
23	3	"Pet Calendar"	November 28, 2013	203
24	4	"For the Birds"	December 5, 2013	204
25	5	"Oh, Christmas Tree!"	December 12, 2013	205
26	6	"Primped Up Pachyderm"	January 16, 2014	206
27	7	"Freaky Fowl Day"	January 23, 2014	207
28	8	"A Walk in the Park"	January 30, 2014	208
29	9	"Gondola with the Wind"	February 6, 2014	209
30	10	"Uh Oh, Pizza Dough"	February 13, 2014	210

=== Season 4 (2014–2015) ===
No. overall	No. in season	Title	Original release date	Prod. code
31	1	"Fiesta Follies"	February 20, 2014	211
32	2	"Royal Delivery"	March 6, 2014	212
33	3	"Kabuki Chaos"	March 13, 2014	213
34	4	"Turkey Time"	November 18, 2014	214
35	5	"Slumber Party"	January 22, 2015	215
36	6	"Rooftop Repair"	January 22, 2015	216
37	7	"Alarm Clocked Out"	January 22, 2015	217

=== Season 5 (2016) ===
No. overall	No. in season	Title	Original release date	Prod. code
38	1	"Happy Campers"	January 22, 2016	218
39	2	"Picnic Panic"	January 22, 2016	219
40	3	"Home, Clean Home!"	January 22, 2016	220

== Revival series (2021–present) ==
=== Season 1: Party Palace Pals! (2021–2022) ===
No. overall	No. in season	Title	Original release date	Prod. code
41	1	"Moving Day"	April 5, 2021	301
42	2	"Bessie Delivers Again!"	April 6, 2021	302
43	3	"The Great Cookie Bake-Off"	April 7, 2021	303
44	4	"Curse of the Pink Purse!"	April 8, 2021	304
45	5	"Rocket Roller Skates"	May 3, 2021	305
46	6	"The Pony Prance Square Dance"	May 4, 2021	306
47	7	"Boing-Boing, Come Home!"	May 5, 2021	307
48	8	"Minnie's Do-It-Yourselfers"	May 6, 2021	308
49	9	"All That Jazz"	June 21, 2021	309
50	10	"Daisy's Crazy Hair Day"	September 24, 2021	310
51	11	"Run Daisy, Run"	September 24, 2021	311
52	12	"The Blustery Day"	September 24, 2021	312
53	13	"Minnie's Halloween Spook-tacular"	October 22, 2021	313
54	14	"Mickey's Party Goes Pop!"	November 5, 2021	314
55	15	"Happy Birthday Minnie Mouse: The Musical"	November 5, 2021	315
56	16	"Clarabelle's Christmas Sweater"	December 17, 2021	316
57	17	"Eye on the Birdy Ball"	January 21, 2022	317
58	18	"Escape From Bouncy Castle Island"	January 21, 2022	318
59	19	"Snow Day Shenanigans"	March 18, 2022	319
60	20	"Clarabelle's Kitty"	March 25, 2022	320

=== Season 2: Party Palace Pals! (2022) ===
No. overall	No. in season	Title	Original release date	Prod. code
61	1	"Ducky Down the Drain"	May 23, 2022	321
62	2	"Monkeys, Monkeys Everywhere!"	May 23, 2022	322
63	3	"Minnie's Wags 'n' Wiggles Pet Parade"	May 24, 2022	323
64	4	"Stop that Shopping Cart!"	May 25, 2022	324
65	5	"Gilbert Sittin'"	May 26, 2022	325
66	6	"A New Kitty in the House"	May 27, 2022	326
67	7	"A Royal Puppy Party"	June 18, 2022	327
68	8	"On a Bicycle Built for Three"	July 2, 2022	328
69	9	"Upsy Minnie and Daisy!"	July 26, 2022	329
70	10	"Vac Attack!"	July 27, 2022	330
71	11	"The Great Critter Caper"	July 28, 2022	331
72	12	"Chill Out!"	July 29, 2022	332
73	13	"Disco to Go!"	September 5, 2022	333
74	14	"The Rolling Cake of Rome"	September 6, 2022	334
75	15	"Achoo-Moo!"	September 7, 2022	335
76	16	"Daisy's Birthday Quack-tastrophe!"	September 8, 2022	336
77	17	"Happy Harvest Day!"	September 9, 2022	337
78	18	"A Dark and Stormy Night at the Party Palace"	September 25, 2022	338
79	19	"Goodnight Owl"	September 30, 2022	339
80	20	"Hide 'n' Go Peep!"	October 8, 2022	340

=== Season 3: Camp Minnie (2023–2024) ===
No. overall	No. in season	Title	Original release date	Prod. code
81	1	"The Great Outdoors"	June 21, 2023	401
82	2	"A Sticky Situation"	June 21, 2023	402
83	3	"Dinner to Go-o-o!"	June 21, 2023	403
84	4	"Pier Pressure"	June 21, 2023	404
85	5	"The Bow Must Go On"	June 21, 2023	405
86	6	"Extreme Minnie Golf"	June 21, 2023	406
87	7	"The Great Treat Heist"	June 21, 2023	407
88	8	"Bouncing Baby Butterfly"	June 21, 2023	408
89	9	"Camp Spooky"	June 21, 2023	409
90	10	"Campground Christmas"	November 27, 2023	410
91	11	"Mountain Yikes"	January 17, 2024	411
92	12	"Fashion in the Forest"	January 17, 2024	412
93	13	"Raiders of the Lost Rock"	January 17, 2024	413
94	14	"My Bunny Valentine"	January 17, 2024	414
95	15	"Birthday Boat Bash"	July 27, 2024	415
96	16	"Make Your Own Sunshine"	July 28, 2024	416
97	17	"The Pony Paddle"	July 29, 2024	417
98	18	"Runaway Napkin"	July 30, 2024	418
99	19	"Take a Hike"	July 31, 2024	419
100	20	"A Shadow and a Doubt"	September 30, 2024	420

=== Season 4: Pet Hotel (2025–2026) ===
No. overall	No. in season	Title	Original release date	Prod. code
101	1	"Happy Barkday"	May 19, 2025	421
102	2	"Puppy Pool Party"	May 20, 2025	422
103	3	"Here We Goat Again"	May 21, 2025	423
104	4	"Bit of a Stretch"	May 22, 2025	424
105	5	"Scoot on Over"	May 23, 2025	425
106	6	"Pampered Pooch"	September 2, 2025	426
107	7	"Little Lost Lizard"	September 2, 2025	427
108	8	"Pirate Parrot"	September 2, 2025	428
109	9	"Funny Bunnies"	September 2, 2025	429
110	10	"The Big Show"	September 2, 2025	430
111	11	"Whoa Christmas Tree"	December 1, 2025	431
112	12	"Galentine's Day"	January 19, 2026	432
113	13	"The Minnie Slide"	January 22, 2026	433
114	14	"A Tangled Yarn"	January 23, 2026	434
115	15	"ClaraBunny"	January 23, 2026	435
116	16	"Minnie and Daisy Pony Up"	May 11, 2026	436
117	17	"Picture Day"	May 12, 2026	437
118	18	"Surprise Pawty"	May 13, 2026	438
119	19	"A Purrfect Plan"	May 14, 2026	439
120	20	"Hoteloween"	September 28, 2026	440

== Release ==
Minnie's Bow-Toons premiered on November 14, 2011, and ended on January 22, 2016, on Disney Junior. Some episodes aired on both on Disney Channel and Disney Junior after their release. The series was later released on DisneyNow.

The revival of the series, titled Minnie's Bow-Toons: Party Palace Pals, was released on April 3, 2021, on the YouTube channel of Disney Junior. It later aired its first episode on April 5 on Disney Channel. The television show was later made available to stream on Disney+ and Disney+ Hotstar.

== Reception ==
=== Critical response ===
Ilanjana Basu of NDTV praised Minnie’s Bow-Toons, describing it as "the perfect treat for pint-sized Minnie Mouse fans". She highlighted the series of shorts where Minnie Mouse ventures into the bow business and opens her own "Bow-tique" alongside Daisy Duck, calling it "the cutest cartoon ever." Preeti Soni of Business Insider India referred to Minnie’s Bow-Toons as one of the "must-watch shows and movies for kids on Disney+ Hotstar." Jordan Payeur of Screen Rant highlighted Oh, Christmas Tree as one of the most entertaining Disney shorts capturing the winter and Christmas experience on Disney+. Payeur noted that the short features Daisy and Minnie engaging in a playful competition while decorating their Christmas trees, which ultimately turns into a fun, shared experience once they recognize the silliness of their rivalry. He also pointed out the prominence of Minnie's Bow-Toons' iconic costume pieces, observing that even Daisy adds a recognizable Minnie bow to her tree.

=== Ratings ===
Minnie's Bow-Toons was watched by approximately 1.522 million viewers on February 2, 2012, corresponding to a 1.52% rating among the audience aged 2 and older (P2+). This represented a decrease in viewership compared to February 5, 2012, when the daily audience was around 1.890 million with a 1.89% rating. The series saw approximately 1.754 million viewers on February 10, 2012, corresponding to a 1.75% rating, increasing to around 3.331 million viewers with a 3.33% rating on February 12. On February 15, 2012, viewership was around 1.498 million (1.50% rating), slightly decreasing the following day to 1.456 million (1.46%). By February 19, viewership rose again to approximately 2.407 million viewers, with a 2.41% rating, reflecting notable fluctuations over the week.

The Walt Disney Company announced that Minnie's Bow-Toons: Party Palace Pals, which debuted in April 2021, remained one of the most-watched series on the Disney Junior YouTube channel, as of May 2022. Market research company Parrot Analytics, which looks at consumer engagement in consumer research, streaming, downloads, and on social media, reported that Minnie’s Bow-Toons was the ninth most in-demand show on Disney+ in the United States during the first quarter of 2021. Parrot Analytics later revealed that the series continued to demonstrate strong demand as of January 2025, with audience engagement 14.9 times the U.S. average, placing it among the top 2.7% of all TV shows. Minnie's Bow-Toons also achieved significant popularity in international markets, including Canada, Spain, and the United Kingdom.

Disney+, which calculates its "Top 10" list based on daily views for episodes and films as well as the popularity of newly released titles, reported that Minnie's Bow-Toons ranked No. 8 on September 4, 2025, and remained on the chart through September 16. The series subsequently returned to the chart at No. 5 on January 25, 2026, and remained there through January 28.

=== Accolades ===
Year	Award	Category	Recipient(s) and nominee(s)	Results	Ref.
2013	Daytime Creative Arts Emmy Awards	Outstanding Individual in Animation	Robert Kline (for "Piano and Shakers")	Won	
2014	BTVA Voice Acting Awards	Best Female Vocal Performance in a Television Series in a Supporting Role – Comedy/Musical	Russi Taylor	Nominated	

== In other media ==
=== Books ===
- In June 2013, Disney Publishing Worldwide released a picture book inspired by "Trouble Times Two" titled Minnie's Bow-Toons: Trouble Times Two.
- In January 2023, Disney Publishing Worldwide released another picture book titled Minnie: Spring at the Bow-tique.

=== Video games ===
- Minnie's Bow-Maker. The game was also released for iPhone and iPad. It features three interactive stories, a bow-making activity, and a runway show where players can showcase the bows they create.
- Minnie's Bow-Toons Dress Up.
- Minnie's Flutterin' Butterfly Bow.
- Minnie's Masquerade Match Up.
- Minnie's Skating Symphony.
- Minnie-Rella's Magical Journey.
- Minnie's Bow Bubble Trouble.

== See also ==
- Mickey Mouse Clubhouse
- Mickey Mouse Mixed-Up Adventures
- Mickey Mouse Funhouse
- Mickey Mouse Clubhouse+
