= Wayne Allwine =

American voice actor and sound effects editor (1947–2009)

- Allwine in 1998
- Born: Wayne Anthony Allwine; February 7, 1947; Glendale, California, U.S.
- Died: May 18, 2009 (aged 62); Los Angeles, California, U.S.
- Resting place: Forest Lawn Memorial Park
- Occupations: Voice actor; sound effects editor; foley artist
- Years active: 1966–2009
- Spouse: Russi Taylor (m. 1991)
- Children: 4

Wayne Anthony Allwine (February 7, 1947 – May 18, 2009) was an American voice actor, sound effects editor, and foley artist. He was best known as the third official voice of Mickey Mouse in English (following Walt Disney and Jimmy MacDonald) and the first official casting following the establishment of Disney Character Voices International in 1988. To date, he holds the record for the longest-running voice actor to play Mickey Mouse, having performed the role for 32 years. He was notably married to Russi Taylor in 1991, who voiced Minnie Mouse until her death in 2019.

== Early life ==
Wayne Anthony Allwine was born in Glendale, California, on February 7, 1947. He is a graduate of John Burroughs High School, where he was particularly active in the school's musical theater department. His father was a barbershop quartet singer.

While in high school, he formed his own acoustic music group, The International Singers, which performed in clubs and colleges throughout the state. After graduating, he briefly toured with the instrumental rock band Davie Allan & the Arrows. In addition to playing rhythm guitar, he can also be heard on harmonica and sax mouthpiece on the 1968 track "Cycle-Delic". He later became an accomplished Dixieland jazz drummer, occasionally sitting in with Firehouse Five Plus Two alumni George Probert's Monrovia Old Style Jazz Band.

== Career ==
In 1966, Allwine started work in the mailing room at the Disney studios, before working in the sound effects department with Jimmy MacDonald.

After working in the sound effects department for seven years, Allwine got a call from Disney for an open audition for the role of Mickey Mouse in late 1976, after a previous actor failed to show up. Upon auditioning for the role, Allwine became the third official voice of Mickey Mouse in 1977. He replaced Jimmy MacDonald, who in 1947 had taken over from Walt Disney himself, who had performed the role since 1928 as well as supplying Mickey's voice for animated portions of the original The Mickey Mouse Club on ABC.

Allwine's first appearance as Mickey was voicing the animated lead-ins for The New Mickey Mouse Club in 1977. His first appearance as Mickey for a theatrical release was in the 1983 featurette Mickey's Christmas Carol. In the same film, he voiced a Santa Claus on the street appealing for charity donations at the start of the movie, Moley (who appears with Ratty) "collecting for the poor", and one of the two weasel undertakers in the Christmas future scene.

He also starred in films such as The Great Mouse Detective (1986), Who Framed Roger Rabbit (1988), The Prince and the Pauper (1990) and Mickey, Donald, Goofy: The Three Musketeers (2004), and the TV series Mickey Mouse Works (1999–2000), House of Mouse (2001–2003), and Mickey Mouse Clubhouse (2006–2012). He has provided Mickey's voice in the popular Kingdom Hearts series of video games prior to Kingdom Hearts: Birth by Sleep, which was done in collaboration with Japanese video game company Square Enix. Kingdom Hearts 358/2 Days, which was released several months after Allwine’s death, was the last game that used his voice (mainly with Mickey as a playable character in Mission Mode), and was dedicated to his memory in North American releases.

In addition to his voice work, Allwine spent much of his career as a sound effects editor and foley artist for Disney films and TV shows, including Splash (1984), Three Men and a Baby (1987); as well as Innerspace (1987), Alien Nation (1988), and Star Trek V: The Final Frontier for other studios. In 1986, he was awarded a group Primetime Emmy Award for his sound editing contributions to Steven Spielberg's anthology television series Amazing Stories.

== Personal life ==
In 1988, Allwine met his wife Russi Taylor, during a recording session of Totally Minnie. They married in 1991 and remained married up until his death in 2009. They were both named Disney Legends in 2008. Allwine fathered three biological children and one adopted child from previous marriages.

== Death ==
Allwine died of complications from diabetes at the age of 62 on Monday, May 18, 2009, at Ronald Reagan UCLA Medical Center in Los Angeles. His understudy, Bret Iwan, assumed the role of voicing Mickey Mouse. Allwine was interred at Forest Lawn Memorial Park in Glendale, California.

== Filmography ==
=== Film ===
Year	Title	Role	Notes
1983	Mickey's Christmas Carol	Mickey Mouse/Weasel Gravedigger/Beggar Dog	Short film
1985	The Black Cauldron	Henchman	
1986	The Great Mouse Detective	Thug Guard #2	
1988	Who Framed Roger Rabbit	Mickey Mouse	
1990	The Prince and the Pauper	Mickey Mouse/Prince	Short film
1995	A Goofy Movie	Mickey Mouse	Cameo
1995	Runaway Brain	Mickey Mouse	Short film
1998	The Spirit of Mickey	Mickey Mouse	Direct-to-video
1999	Mickey's Once Upon a Christmas	Mickey Mouse	Direct-to-video
1999	Fantasia 2000	Mickey Mouse	Segment: "Pomp and Circumstance"
2001	Mickey's Magical Christmas: Snowed in at the House of Mouse	Mickey Mouse	Direct-to-video
2002	Mickey's House of Villains	Mickey Mouse	Direct-to-video
2004	Mickey, Donald, Goofy: The Three Musketeers	Mickey Mouse	Direct-to-video
2004	Mickey's Twice Upon a Christmas	Mickey Mouse	Direct-to-video

=== Television ===
Year	Title	Role	Notes
1977–1979	The New Mickey Mouse Club	Mickey Mouse	11 episodes
1983	Mousercise	Mickey Mouse	
1985	Ludwig's Think Tank	Ludwig Von Drake	Television special
1987	D-TV Doggone Valentine	Mickey Mouse	Television film
1987	D-TV Monster Hits	Mickey Mouse	Television film
1988	Totally Minnie	Mickey Mouse	Television film
1988	Mickey's 60th Birthday	Mickey Mouse	Television film
1988	Here's to you, Mickey Mouse	Mickey Mouse	Television film
1989	Walt Disney's Wonderful World of Color	Mickey Mouse	2 episodes
1990	The Muppets at Walt Disney World	Mickey Mouse	Television film
1990	Disney Sing-Along Songs: Disneyland Fun	Mickey Mouse	Direct-to-video
1992	Mickey's Nutcracker	Mickey Mouse	Uncredited; Television special
1993	Bonkers	Mickey Mouse	Episode: "I Oughta Be in Toons"
1994–1995	Mickey's Fun Songs series	Mickey Mouse	Direct-to-video
1995	Mickey: Reelin' Through the Years	Mickey Mouse	Television film
1999–2000	Mickey Mouse Works	Mickey Mouse	25 episodes
2001–2003	House of Mouse	Mickey Mouse	52 episodes
2006–2012	Mickey Mouse Clubhouse	Mickey Mouse	99 episodes (many aired after his death, with Choo Choo Express being dedicated to his memory)
2025	Mickey Mouse Clubhouse+	Mickey Mouse	Posthumous release; archival recording of Mickey's line "Right here!" was used in the theme song

=== Video games ===
Year	Title	Role	Notes
1998	My Disney Kitchen	Mickey Mouse	
2000	Mickey's Speedway USA	Mickey Mouse	
2000	Mickey Mouse Preschool	Mickey Mouse	
2000	Mickey Mouse Kindergarten	Mickey Mouse	
2000	Mickey Mouse Toddler	Mickey Mouse	
2001	Disney Learning: Phonics Quest	Mickey Mouse	
2002	Disney Learning Adventure: Search for the Secret Keys	Mickey Mouse	
2002	Kingdom Hearts	Mickey Mouse	
2002	Disney's Magical Mirror Starring Mickey Mouse	Mickey Mouse	
2002	Disney Golf	Mickey Mouse	
2002	Disney Sports Soccer	Mickey Mouse	
2002	Disney Sports Skateboarding	Mickey Mouse	
2002	Disney Sports Football	Mickey Mouse	
2002	Disney Sports Basketball	Mickey Mouse	
2003	Disney's Party	Mickey Mouse	
2003	Disney's Hide and Sneak	Mickey Mouse	
2003	Toontown Online	Mickey Mouse	
2006	Kingdom Hearts II	Mickey Mouse	
2008	Disney Think Fast	Mickey Mouse	
2008	Kingdom Hearts Re: Chain of Memories	Mickey Mouse	
2009	Kingdom Hearts 358/2 Days	Mickey Mouse	Posthumous release; dedicated to his memory
2013	Kingdom Hearts HD 1.5 Remix	Mickey Mouse	(Kingdom Hearts Final Mix and RE:CoM)
2014	Kingdom Hearts HD 2.5 Remix	Mickey Mouse	(Kingdom Hearts II Final Mix)
2017	Kingdom Hearts HD 1.5 + 2.5 Remix	Mickey Mouse	(Kingdom Hearts Final Mix, RE:CoM and Kingdom Hearts II Final Mix)

=== Theme parks ===
Year	Title	Role
1991	Muppet*Vision 3D	Waldo C. Graphic posing as Mickey Mouse
1992	Fantasmic!	Mickey Mouse
2003	Mickey's PhilharMagic	Mickey Mouse

== Crew work ==
Year	Title	Position	Notes
1977	A Christmas Carol	Sound effects editor	
1979	The Black Hole	Sound effects editor	
1981	The Fox and the Hound	Sound effects editor	Uncredited
1983	Winnie the Pooh and a Day for Eeyore	Sound effects editor	Uncredited
1983	Something Wicked This Way Comes	Sound effects editor	
1983	Mickey's Christmas Carol	Sound effects editor	Uncredited
1984	Country	Sound effects editor	
1984	Frankenweenie	Foley artist	
1985	Baby: Secret of the Lost Legend	Foley artist	
1985	The Black Cauldron	Sound editor	
1985	My Science Project	Sound editor	
1985	Amazing Stories	Sound editor	1 episode
1986	Psycho III	Sound editor	
1986	The Great Mouse Detective	Sound editor	
1987	Innerspace	Sound editor	
1987	3 Men and a Baby	Sound editor	
1988	Alien Nation	Sound editor	
1988	The Good Mother	Sound editor	
1989	Three Fugitives	Sound editor	
1989	Star Trek V: The Final Frontier	Sound editor	

== Awards and nominations ==
Awards and nominations
Year	Award	Category	Title	Result
1985	Golden Reel Award (Motion Picture Sound Editors)	Best Sound Editing – Television Pilots and Specials	Amazing Stories: "The Mission"	Won
1986	Primetime Emmy Award	Outstanding Sound Editing for a Series	Amazing Stories: "The Mission"	Won
1987	Golden Reel Award (Motion Picture Sound Editors)	Best Sound Editing – Animated Feature	The Great Mouse Detective	Won
2008	Disney Legend Award	Animation – Voice		Won

Preceded by Jimmy MacDonald	Voice of Mickey Mouse; 1977–2009	Succeeded by Bret Iwan
