= Avalon Robbins =

American model and actress

- Born: San Diego, California, United States
- Occupations: Model, actress
- Years active: 2010–present

Avalon Robbins is an American model and actress. She voiced Millie and Melody Mouse in Minnie's Bow-Toons in 2011 and had a major role in the 2012 film The Three Stooges.

== Personal life ==
She lives in San Diego, California. She went to Earl Warren Middle School in Solana Beach, California and attended Torrey Pines High School in Del Mar, California, graduating in 2019.

== Filmography ==
Year	Title	Role	Notes
2010	I Didn't Know I Was Pregnant	Meg	Episode: "Baby on a Boat"
2010	Special Agent Oso	Harper (voice)	Episode: "Goldscooter/The Boy with the Colored Crayons"
2010	White Wolf	Rachel	
2011	Lenore	Lenore	
2011–2016	Minnie's Bow-Toons	Millie Mouse, Melody Mouse (voices)	40 episodes
2012	The Three Stooges	Murph	
2014	Mickey Mouse Clubhouse	Millie Mouse, Melody Mouse (voices)	Episode: "Minnie's Winter Bow Show"
2015	Scarf	Young Samantha	
2017–2020	Mickey and the Roadster Racers	Millie Mouse, Melody Mouse, Additional voices (voices)	5 episodes
