= Mickey Mouse Mixed-Up Adventures =

American animated children's TV series

- Also known as: Mickey and the Roadster Racers (seasons 1–2) (Note: The first two seasons were retroactively titled Mickey Mouse Roadster Racers around the time the third season premiered.)
- Genre: Educational; Musical; Adventure; Sports (auto racing); Comedy
- Based on: Mickey Mouse & Friends by Walt Disney & Ub Iwerks; Mickey Mouse Clubhouse by Bobs Gannaway
- Developed by: Rob LaDuca; Mark Seidenberg
- Directed by: Kelly Ward (dialogue director)
- Voices of: Bret Iwan; Russi Taylor (2017–2021); Kaitlyn Robrock (2020–2021); Bill Farmer; Daniel Ross; Tress MacNeille; Dee Bradley Baker; Corey Burton; Jim Cummings; Nika Futterman; Jay Leno; Frank Welker; April Winchell
- Theme music composer: Beau Black
- Opening theme: "Mickey and the Roadster Racers" Main Title Theme by Beau Black (seasons 1–2) "Mickey Mouse Mixed-Up Adventures" Main Title Theme by Beau Black (season 3)
- Ending theme: "Roadster Racers Go!" by Beau Black "Super-Charged" by Beau Black (in some episodes) "Mickey Mouse Mixed-Up Adventures" Main Title Theme (Instrumental)
- Composers: Beau Black & Loren Hoskins (songs); Mike Barnett (score); They Might Be Giants (performers of "Hot Dog! Dance Break")
- Country of origin: United States
- Original language: English
- No. of seasons: 3
- No. of episodes: 87 (174 segments) (list of episodes)

Production
- Executive producers: Rob LaDuca; Mark Seidenberg
- Editor: Reid Kramer
- Running time: 20–24 minutes (10–12 minutes per segment)
- Production company: Disney Television Animation (Note: Animation outsourced to Technicolor Animation Productions and DQ Entertainment.)

Original release
- Network: Disney Junior
- Release: January 15, 2017 – October 1, 2021

Related
- Mickey Mouse Clubhouse (2006–2016); Mickey Mouse Funhouse (2021–2025); Mickey Mouse Clubhouse+ (2025–present); Minnie's Bow-Toons (2011–2016; 2021–present)

Mickey Mouse Mixed-Up Adventures is an American animated children's television series developed by Rob LaDuca and Mark Seidenberg that was broadcast on Disney Junior. Produced by Disney Television Animation, the series is the successor to Mickey Mouse Clubhouse. Originally airing as Mickey and the Roadster Racers for its first two seasons, it debuted on its first two episodes consecutively on January 15, 2017.

The series was renewed for a second season on March 15, 2017 which premiered on April 13, 2018. The show’s third season was renewed one year later, which led to the series changing its name to Mickey Mouse Mixed-Up Adventures. The first episode under the new title was originally broadcast on October 14, 2019.

This was Russi Taylor's final television series role before her death on July 26, 2019. It is also the only series produced since 1985 not to feature Tony Anselmo as Donald Duck due to him being too busy providing the voice for the character in other Disney projects, including DuckTales, Kingdom Hearts III and Legend of the Three Caballeros. Donald was voiced by Daniel Ross in this series.

The show was followed by a new series, Mickey Mouse Funhouse, which debuted on August 20, 2021.

In 2021, two 46-minute holiday specials based on the series were released: a Halloween special, Mickey's Tale of Two Witches, on October 7, 2021, and a Christmas special, Mickey and Minnie Wish Upon a Christmas, on December 2, 2021. They were followed by a 24-minute Christmas special, Mickey and the Very Many Christmases, which premiered on December 1, 2024.

== Plot ==
Mickey Mouse Mixed-Up Adventures centers around the Sensational Six (Mickey, Minnie, Goofy, Donald, Daisy, and Pluto) as they live and race around their town of Hot Dog Hills and around the world. Unlike the previous series, this show contains two 11-minute stories as opposed to Clubhouse's full-length 22-minute stories.

In the first half, Billy Beagle commentates on Mickey and his friends' races whether the race is in Hot Dog Hills or somewhere else around the world. In the second half, Minnie and Daisy work as the Happy Helpers alongside Cuckoo-Loca (from Minnie's Bow-Toons) where they help out different residents of Hot Dog Hills. Minnie and Daisy use the Turnstyler located in the office and the Happy Helper Van to assume the clothes associated with their jobs that they are hired to help out on.

In Season 2, the Roadster Racers get their roadsters modified by Ludwig Von Drake so that they can become Super-charged. The theme song was also altered near the end for the Super-charged part.

In Season 3, Mickey builds a mixed-up motor lab that mixes up and transforms cars. In between segments and before the credits, the show starts to use a remix of the classic "Hot Dog" song originally written and performed by They Might Be Giants for Mickey Mouse Clubhouse.

== Characters ==
=== Main ===
- Mickey Mouse (voiced by Bret Iwan) is the optimistic and easygoing leader of the Roadster Racers and owner of Mickey's garage. Mickey drives the Hot Doggin' Hot Rod which is based on a 1929 Ford Roadster.
- Minnie Mouse (voiced by Russi Taylor from 2017 to 2019 and Kaitlyn Robrock from 2020 to 2021) is Mickey's girlfriend and one of the Happy Helpers. Minnie drives Pink Thunder which is based on a Chevrolet Corvette (C3).
- Donald Duck (voiced by Daniel Ross) is the co-leader and co-owner of Mickey's garage and Mickey's best friend. He also owns a pet skunk named Lil’ Stinker. Donald is the most determined racer and attempts to win. Donald drives the Cabin Cruiser which is based on a 1969 Dodge Daytona and a Chevrolet Corvette (C6). This series is the first and, so far, only series where Donald isn't voiced by Tony Anselmo.
- Daisy Duck (voiced by Tress MacNeille) is Donald's girlfriend, Minnie's best friend and one of the Happy Helpers. Daisy drives Snapdragon which is based on a Dragster.
- Goofy (voiced by Bill Farmer) is the owner of the Hot Diggity hot dog trailer frequented by Pete. Goofy drives the Turbo Tubster which is based on a T-bucket.
- Pluto (vocal effects provided by Bill Farmer) is Mickey's pet dog.

=== Recurring ===
- Cuckoo-Loca (voiced by Nika Futterman) is a female wind-up cuckoo who lives in Minnie and Daisy's cuckoo clock and tags along with the Happy Helpers. A running gag is that Cuckoo-Loca tends to make sarcastic remarks towards the Happy Helpers jingle.
- Pete (voiced by Jim Cummings) is the Hot Dog Hills' resident tow truck driver and owner of Pete's Junkyard. Pete drives the Super Crusher, based on a Chevrolet Corvette (C6), when he gets involved in races. In addition to having some relatives that get involved, Pete appears in various alter egos throughout the series.
- Clarabelle Cow (voiced by April Winchell) is a cow and the owner of a baking business in Hot Dog Hills. She is often seen operating the racing flags. Clarabelle has also been seen hosting several international events on the show. She works as a chef and is Goofy's girlfriend.
- Clara Cluck (vocal effects provided by Russi Taylor from 2017 to 2020, Kaitlyn Robrock in 2020) is a female farmer and resident of Hot Dog Hills who mostly speaks chicken language.
- Chip and Dale (voiced by Tress MacNeille and Corey Burton respectively) are two chipmunks who are mechanics for the racers.
- Horace Horsecollar (voiced by Bill Farmer) who, in addition to being a resident of Hot Dog Hills, appears in various alter egos throughout the series
- Ludwig Von Drake (voiced by Corey Burton) is Donald's uncle and the Hot Dog Hills' residential inventor who has a laboratory beneath Mickey's garage. In "Grandpa Beagle's Day Out", it is revealed that Ludwig Von Drake also operates as a bicycle mechanic shop under the alias of Doc Sprockets.
- Hilda (voiced by April Winchell) is a female hippopotamus who engages in any sport.
- Figaro (vocal effects provided by Frank Welker) is Minnie's pet tuxedo cat.
- Butch (vocal effects provided by Frank Welker) is Pete's pet bulldog and Pluto's rival.
- Millie and Melody Mouse (voiced by Avalon Robbins and Grace Kaufman in Season 1–2 and Vivian Vencer and Stella Edwards in Season 3 respectively) are Minnie's nieces.
- Billy Beagle (voiced by Jay Leno) is the announcer and sports commentator of the races and other events. Billy is also shown to have a collection of roadsters and also works as the host of "Billy Beagle's Tip Top Garage".
- Commander Heist (voiced by Steve Valentine) is an infamous male British international master criminal who is the main antagonist of the series. His design resembles Ernst Stavro Blofeld.
  - Lazlo (vocal effects provided by Dee Bradley Baker) is Commander Heist's pet cat.
- Robbie Roberts (voiced by Tim Gunn) is a critic and fashion male designer who appears to be a judge and receives very harsh reviews from the crowd.
- Lil' Stinker (vocal effects provided by Dee Bradley Baker) is a skunk who becomes Donald Duck's pet.

=== Hot Dog Hills residents ===
- Mayor McBeagle (voiced by Bill Farmer) is the male mayor of Hot Dog Hills.
- Bertram Bigby (voiced by Bill Farmer) is a rich male pig who is the owner of the Bigby Bank & Trust.
- Pinky Bigby (voiced by Andrea Martin) is a female poodle who is Mr. Bigby's wife.
- Susie Beagleman (voiced by Natalie Coughlin) is a little female beagle girl that the Happy Helpers tend to help out on occasion.
- Mrs. Beagleman (voiced by Tress MacNeille) is Susie's mother.
- Clifford and Cleo Cluck (vocal effects provided by Dee Bradley Baker) are Clara Cluck's chicks who do not talk and instead cluck.
- Elray Thunderboom (voiced by Evan Kishiyama) is a young male elephant.
- Mr. Thunderboom (voiced by Jim Cummings) is Elray's father.
- Mrs. Thunderboom (voiced by Nika Futterman) is Elray's mother.
- Bitsy Beagleberg (voiced by Mckenna Grace) is a young female beagle girl.
- Mr. McSnorter (voiced by Patton Oswalt) is a male pig who is the head of Hot Dog Hills' condiment factory.
- Mrs. McSnorter (voiced by Russi Taylor) is a female pig who is married to Maynard McSnorter.
- Pearl McSnorter (voiced by Stella Edwards) is a female pig who is the sister of Puck McSnorter.
- Puck McSnorter (voiced by August Maturo) is a male pig who is the brother of Pearl McSnorter.
- Buddy McBilly (voiced by Cooper Stutler) is a young male goat who was shy at first. Starting with season 3, Buddy is considered a fan of Mickey.
- Mr. McBilly (voiced by Bill Farmer) is Buddy's father.
- Mrs. McBilly (voiced by Leigh-Allyn Baker) is Buddy's mother.
- Jinx (vocal effects provided by Dee Bradley Baker) is a white female kitten that wears a bow and causes trouble wherever Jinx goes and always has a red bouncy ball, hence her name. Jinx later gets adopted by Emmy Lou.
- Babette Beagle (voiced by Jane Leeves) is the curator of the Hot Dog Hills Art Museum.
- Mr. Doozy (voiced by Fred Willard) is the manager of the Snoozy Doozy Bed and Breakfast who also works as its bellhop, cook and repairman.
- Nina Doozy (voiced by Leigh-Allyn Baker) is a relative of Mr. Doozy.
- Dandelion Doozy (voiced by Leigh-Allyn Baker) is Nina Doozy's niece.
- Grandpa Beagle (voiced by Héctor Elizondo) is the grandfather of Billy Beagle who is into extreme sports much to Billy's dismay.
- Emmy Lou (voiced by Kate Micucci) is a female beagle who first appeared working as the first mate of Captain Peterson. In "Hi Jinx", Emmy Lou moves into the apartment across from the Happy Helpers' office and gets Jinx as a pet.
- Mrs. Sweetums (voiced by Hoda Kotb in "Super Sweet Helpers", Tress MacNeille in "Cuckoo in Hot Dog Hills!") is the proprietor of the candy store Sweetums' Sweets.
- Ivy Beaglesnoot (voice by Nika Futterman) is the proprietor of the Hot Dog Hills Wild Animal Safari Park.
- Uncle Goof (voiced by Bill Farmer) is an explorer who is Goofy's uncle.
- Jimbo (voiced by Fred Stoller) is Pete's nephew.
- Mama Pete (voiced by Elayne Boosler) is the mother of Pete and the aunt of Jimbo.
- GramQuacker Lily (voiced by Tress MacNeille) is Daisy's grandmother.
- Uncle Manny (voiced by Richard Kind) is Donald's uncle.
- Lisa Longtree (voiced by Leigh-Allyn Baker)
- Coach Hannah (voiced by Leigh-Allyn Baker) is Hilda's ice-skating coach.
- Fiona Featherstone (voiced by Leigh-Allyn Baker) is a female ostrich who was Mr. Doozy’s dance partner prior to Emmy Lou in "The Happiest Helpers’ Cruise!".
- Portia DeHound (voiced by Leigh-Allyn Baker) is an actress.
- Jasper (voiced by Maulik Pancholy) is the Pet Store owner.

=== Characters in international locations ===
The following characters reside in international locations that Team Mickey visits for their events:

- José Carioca and Panchito Pistoles (voiced by Rob Paulsen and Carlos Alazraqui) are Donald's friends and members of the band the Three Caballeros in Spain.
- Agent Chauncey Chip (voiced by Peter Serafinowicz) is a British spy who is identical to Goofy. He is a reference to James Bond. His car also resembles Bond's Aston Martin DB5.
- Queen Elizabeth II (voiced by Jane Leeves) is depicted as a female mouse.
- Auntie Olina (voiced by Tia Carrere) is a female friend of Team Mickey who resides in Hawaii.
  - Leilani (voiced by Megan Richie) is the daughter of Olina.
  - Grandpa Kai (voiced by Jim Cummings) is the father of Olina and grandfather of Leilani. In "Grandpa vs. Grandpa", it is revealed that Kai had a rivalry with Grandpa Beagle.
- William "Willie" Bartholomew Beagle (voiced by Steve Valentine) is a male British announcer for British events that Mickey and his friends take part in.
- Dr. Waddleton Crutchley (voiced by Peter Serafinowicz in "Tea Time Trouble!", Stephen Fry in "Shenannygans!") is male resident of London who teaches people how to act like gentlemen.
- Chef Pierre la Pierre (voiced by Jon Curry) is a male chef in Paris and is good friends with Mickey.
- Chef Celeste (voiced by Marieve Herington) is a chef and the star pupil of a culinary academy who originally operated as the Phantom Chef.
  - Patrice (vocal effects provided by Dee Bradley Baker) is Chef Celeste's pet poodle.
- Cuckoo La-La (voiced by Nika Futterman) is Cuckoo-Loca's cousin from France, where she runs a fashion store.
- Almanda de Quack (voiced by Camilla Belle) is Daisy's cousin from Brazil.
- Heidi (voiced by Leigh-Allyn Baker) is an activities director in Switzerland.
- Raj (voiced by Ariyah Kssam) is a friend of Mickey's group who lives in India.
- Savi (voiced by Richa Shulka) is Raj's wife.
- Princess Olivia (voiced by Madison Pettis) is the Princess of Royalandia.

== Episodes ==
| Season | Segments | Episodes | Originally released | |
| Season | Segments | Episodes | First released | Last released |
|---|---|---|---|---|
| 1 | 52 | 26 | January 15, 2017 | March 23, 2018 |
| 2 | 50 | 25 | April 13, 2018 | August 2, 2019 |
| 3 | 72 | 36 | October 14, 2019 | October 1, 2021 |

== Release ==
=== Broadcast ===
The first season of Mickey and the Roadster Racers debuted on Disney Junior in the United States on January 15, 2017. The series also aired on Disney Junior in Canada on January 24, Disney Junior in Australia on March 17, Disney Junior in Asia on March 24, Disney Junior in the UK and Ireland on April 19, Disney Junior in South Africa on April 22, and Disney Channel in India on May 15.

=== Home media ===
The first release, entitled "Mickey and the Roadster Racers", was released on DVD on March 7, 2017. "Minnie's Happy Helpers" was released on July 25, 2017, with the release themed around the Minnie and Daisy subplots. "Disney Junior Holiday" was released on October 23, 2018. "Minnie Bow Be Mine" was released on February 5, 2019.

The show is available on Disney's streaming service, Disney+ and in select countries under Disney+ Hotstar. However, the seasons are listed separately due to the 2019 rebrand, with Seasons 1–2 under Mickey Mouse Roadster Racers and Season 3 under Mickey Mouse Mixed-Up Adventures.

Note: In the Disney+ reprint of the season 1 episode, "Ye Olde Royal Heist", the scene where Lord Pete bumps Donald's Roadster into the River Thames was cut for unknown reasons.

== Reception ==
=== Critical response ===
Emily Ashby of Common Sense Media gave Mickey and the Roadster Racers a grade of three out of five stars. She complimented the show for illustrating community dynamics and promoting the importance of friendship through the characters' interactions. Ashby found that the frequent racing scenes provide excitement and engagement for young viewers, making it a delightful experience for children. Charles Curtis of USA Today ranked the show ninth in their "20 Best Shows for Kids Right Now" list in March 2020, stating, "Whether it's Mickey Mouse Clubhouse, Mickey and the Roadster Racers, or Mickey Mouse Mixed-Up Adventures, they're all good."

Marisa Lascala of Good Housekeeping described Mickey Mouse: Mixed-Up Adventures as a "great toddler show". Kristin Smith of Plugged In complimented Mickey Mouse: Mixed-Up Adventures for its "lovable, well-known group of companions", including Mickey, Pluto, and Goofy, who work together as a team. She found that the characters are capable of tackling "no mystery too mild and no task too tiny", stating that they bring "fun-loving action" to every scenario they encounter.

=== Ratings ===
The debut of Mickey and the Roadster Racers on January 15 achieved the No. 1 cable TV telecast in more than a year among Kids 2–5 (1.3 million viewers, 8.0 rating) and Boys 2–5 (726,000 viewers, 9.0 rating). It also ranked No. 1 among Girls 2–5 (533,000 viewers, 7.0 rating) since November 2016. The premiere had 3.6 million Total Viewers and a 1.2 million Adults 18–49 audience (1.0 rating). On digital platforms, the show saw 1.4 million engagements via the Disney Junior app, 5 million reach on Facebook, and 1 million video views on YouTube. In March 2017, Mickey and the Roadster Racers has reached more than 41 million US viewers since its January premiere.

=== Accolades ===
| Year | Awards | Category | Nominee(s) | Result | Ref. |
|---|---|---|---|---|---|
| 2017 | Music + Sound Awards | Best Sound Design: Television Programme | Kate Finan, Brad Meyer, Jacob Cook | Nominated | |
| 2018 | Music + Sound Awards | Best Sound Design: Television Programme | Brad Meyer, Kate Finan, James Singleton | Nominated | |
| 2018 | Annie Award | Best Animated Television/Broadcast Production for Preschool Children | Mickey and the Roadster Racers | Nominated | |
| 2018 | Daytime Emmy Awards | Outstanding Sound Editing in a Preschool Animated Program | Brad Meyer, Kate Finan, James Singleton | Nominated | |
| 2020 | NAMIC Vision Awards | Animation | Mickey Mouse: Mixed-Up Adventures | Nominated | |

== Spin-offs: Short series and holiday specials ==
=== Short series ===
==== Chip 'n Dale's Nutty Tales ====
Chip 'n Dale's Nutty Tales is a spin-off series which premiered on November 13, 2017. It aired in the daytime Disney Junior programming block for younger audiences. The plot revolves around Chip and Dale chasing after a nut which leads them to a resident in Hot Dog Hills, normally a main character, who has a problem in which the two are happy to help with.

==== Mickey Mouse Hot Diggity-Dog Tales ====
Mickey Mouse Hot Diggity-Dog Tales is a spin-off short series that premiered on October 14, 2019.

==== Me & Mickey ====
Me & Mickey is a vlog-style short series that premiered on January 10, 2020. The first three seasons take place in Mickey's house in Hot Dog Hills. Later seasons are also based on the successors to Mickey Mouse Mixed-Up Adventures. In season 3, Mickey and friends go on a camping trip, acting as a spin-off of the episode "Happy Campers" from Mickey Mouse Funhouse. In season 4, the location has moved to Mickey's clubhouse featured in Mickey Mouse Clubhouse+. In season 5, Mickey and friends play sports at the clubhouse.

=== Holiday specials ===
==== Mickey's Tale of Two Witches ====
Mickey's Tale of Two Witches is a spin-off Halloween special that was released on October 7, 2021. Mickey tells Pluto a story about two witches-in-training, Minnie the Wonderful and Daisy Doozy who work together to defeat a ghost and save Happy Haunt Hills.

==== Mickey and Minnie Wish Upon a Christmas ====
Mickey and Minnie Wish Upon a Christmas is a spin-off Christmas special that was released on December 2, 2021. Mickey and friends get separated after shopping for gifts, and have to get back to Hot Dog Hills to celebrate Christmas together.

==== Mickey and the Very Many Christmases ====
Mickey and the Very Many Christmases is a spin-off Christmas special that was released on December 1, 2024. Mickey wishes that Christmas could last forever, which unintentionally leads him into a time loop.

==== Mickey's Home Alone ====
Mickey's Home Alone is a spin-off Christmas special that is scheduled to be released in 2026.

=== Stop-motion holiday specials ===
==== Mickey Saves Christmas ====
Mickey Saves Christmas is a spin-off Christmas special that aired on November 27, 2022. This is the first stop-motion Mickey Mouse project. Mickey and friends travel from Hot Dog Hills to the North Pole to save Christmas and find the true meaning of celebrating the holiday.

==== Mickey and Friends: Trick or Treats ====
Mickey and Friends: Trick or Treats is a spin-off Halloween special that premiered on October 1, 2023. Mickey and friends find a haunted mansion whilst trick-or-treating when they meet a witch who transforms them into their costumes.
