= Mickey and Minnie Wish Upon a Christmas =

2021 TV special for Mickey Mouse

- Promotional poster
- Genre: Christmas; Family
- Written by: Kim Duran
- Directed by: Broni Likomanov
- Starring: Bret Iwan; Bill Farmer; Daniel Ross; Tress MacNeille; Kaitlyn Robrock; Jim Cummings; Brock Powell; Nika Futterman; April Winchell
- Composers: Beau Black & David Goldsmith (songs); Tony Morales (underscore)
- Country of origin: United States
- Original language: English

Production
- Executive producers: Rob LaDuca; Mark Seidenberg
- Producer: Bradley Bowlen
- Editor: Reid Kramer
- Running time: 46 minutes
- Production company: Disney Television Animation

Original release
- Network: Disney Junior
- Release: December 2, 2021

Mickey and Minnie Wish Upon a Christmas is a musical Christmas television special released on December 2, 2021 on Disney Junior. It is produced by Disney Television Animation. It is the second spin-off special of Mickey Mouse Mixed-Up Adventures after Mickey's Tale of Two Witches.

== Premise ==
Mickey and friends' traditions of togetherness are threatened when they get separated after shopping for gifts, and decide to get back to Hot Dog Hills in time for Christmas.

== Voice cast ==
- Bret Iwan as Mickey Mouse
- Kaitlyn Robrock as Minnie Mouse, Jenny
- Daniel Ross as Donald Duck
- Tress MacNeille as Daisy Duck
- Bill Farmer as Goofy Goof
- Nika Futterman as Cuckoo-Loca
- Jim Cummings as Pete
- Brock Powell as Santa Claus, Henry
- April Winchell as Clarabelle Cow (Winchell is credited even though she is absent in the special)

== Songs ==
- "The Merriest is Yet To Come" – sung by Minnie & the gang
- "The Perfect Gift" – sung by Mickey & the gang
- "Christmas Is" – sung by Minnie
- "Wish Upon a Christmas" – performed by Beau Black
- "What Makes Christmas Christmas" – sung by Mickey & the gang

== Release ==
Mickey and Minnie Wish Upon a Christmas premiered on December 2, 2021, on Disney Junior. The television special was later released on DisneyNow. It was subsequently made available for streaming on Disney+.

== Reception ==
=== Critical response ===
Ben Breitbart of LaughingPlace.com described Mickey and Minnie Wish Upon a Christmas as a "strong holiday special," noting that it captures the nostalgia and joy of the season. He likened it to the Disney equivalent of a Hallmark movie, stating, "Spending time with familiar friends in a familiar setup is perfect to bring a smile to your face." He highly recommended the special for both family viewing and personal enjoyment. Sydni Ellis of People included the special in their list of the "Best Christmas Movies" to stream on Disney+ in 2022.

Marcus Gibson of BubbleBlabber gave Mickey and Minnie Wish Upon a Christmas a grade of 7.5/10, saying it is a cute and engaging holiday special that satisfies Mickey Mouse fans of all ages. He found its straightforward storytelling and return of beloved characters, like Cuckoo Loca, charming and accessible for newcomers. Gibson praised the lighthearted adventures and heartwarming message about celebrating the holidays with loved ones. Stephanie Snyde of Common Sense Media rated it three out of five stars, noting its positive messages and role models, emphasizing the importance of friends and family as demonstrated by the characters, and complimented the songs and humor throughout the special.

=== Ratings ===
On its premiere airing on Disney Junior at 7:00 p.m. on December 2, 2021, Mickey and Minnie Wish Upon a Christmaswas watched by 0.38 million viewers. The special was rebroadcast the following day on Disney Channel at 9:30 a.m., attracting 0.26 million viewers. On December 22, 2022, the program was viewed by 143,000 total viewers (P2+) with a 0.05% rating, including 52,200 viewers aged 18–49 (0.04% rating). Other broadcasts on Disney Channel included 134,000 viewers on December 16, 2022, and 105,000 viewers on December 23, 2022. On December 25, 2022, the program drew 74,000 viewers (0.02% rating). On November 25, 2023, Mickey Saves Christmas was viewed by 126,000 total viewers (P2+) with a 0.04% rating, including 39,600 viewers aged 18–49 (0.03% rating), representing a 70% increase in total viewership compared to the December 25, 2022 broadcast.

=== Accolades ===
List of awards and nominations for Mickey and Minnie Wish Upon a Christmas
| Year | Award | Category | Recipient(s) | Result | Ref. |
|---|---|---|---|---|---|
| 2022 | Children's and Family Emmy Awards | Outstanding Voice Performance in a Preschool Animated Program | Daniel Ross | Won | |
| 2023 | Kidscreen Awards | Best One-Off, Special or TV Movie: Preschool | Bradley Bowlen, Mark Seidenberg, Rob LaDuca, Disney Television Animation | Won | |

== In other media ==
=== Books ===
In September 2023, Disney Publishing Worldwide released a book inspired by the television special titled Mickey and Minnie Wish Upon a Christmas.
