= Mickey Mouse Clubhouse+ =

American animated interactive children's television series

- Also known as: Mickey Mouse Clubhouse 2.0
- Genre: Comedy; Adventure; Fantasy; Preschool; Slapstick; Musical; Educational
- Based on: Mickey Mouse & Friends by Walt Disney & Ub Iwerks; Mickey Mouse Clubhouse by Bobs Gannaway
- Developed by: Rob LaDuca; Kim Duran
- Directed by: Broni Likomanov; Jeff Gordon; Kelly Ward (dialogue director)
- Voices of: Bret Iwan; Kaitlyn Robrock; Tony Anselmo; Tress MacNeille; Bill Farmer; Brock Powell; April Winchell; Jim Cummings; Corey Burton; Dee Bradley Baker
- Opening theme: "Mickey Mouse Clubhouse Theme Song" by They Might Be Giants
- Ending theme: "Hot Dog!" by They Might Be Giants
- Composers: Mike Himelstein & Michael Turner; Natsumi Osawa (additional music); Michael Rubin (The Mouskedoer Song)
- Country of origin: United States
- Original language: English
- No. of seasons: 2
- No. of episodes: 40

Production
- Executive producers: Rob LaDuca; Sandrine Nguyen; Lori Wong; Sarankumar Nadamuni; Kumar Chandrasekaren; Prabhakar Sambandan; Sally Toms
- Producers: Kim Duran; Ciara Anderson
- Running time: 24 minutes; 46 minutes (episode 29)
- Production company: Disney Television Animation (Note: Animation production by Mikros Animation from episodes 1–14, OuiDo! Productions and Saffronic since episode 15)

Original release
- Network: Disney Jr.; Disney+
- Release: July 21, 2025 – present

Related
- Mickey Mouse Clubhouse (2006–2016); Mickey Mouse Mixed-Up Adventures (2017–2021); Mickey Mouse Funhouse (2021–2025); Minnie's Bow-Toons (2011–2016; 2021–present); Me & Mickey (2022–present)

Mickey Mouse Clubhouse+ is an American animated interactive children's television series developed by Rob LaDuca and Kim Duran and produced by Disney Television Animation for Disney Jr. and Disney+. It is a reboot of the original Mickey Mouse Clubhouse series, which aired on Playhouse Disney and later Disney Jr. from 2006 to 2016.

The series premiered on July 21, 2025 on Disney Jr. and is available to stream on Disney+.

== Premise ==
Mickey and his pals lead viewers through episodes using songs and entertaining sequences. The show features interactive segments for the viewers to stimulate problem solving during a self contained story.

Once the episode's situation is explained, Mickey invites the viewers to join him at the Mousekedoer, a giant Mickey-shaped computer that distributes the day's Mouseketools, a collection of tools needed to solve the day's problem, to Toodles, a small, flying extension of the Mousekedoer. By calling "Oh, Toodles!" he pops up from where he is hiding and flies up to the screen so the viewer can pick which tool is needed for the current situation. Instead of the "Mystery Mouseketool" from the original show, every episode has a "Mystery Mousekepal" who will assist Mickey upon being summoned.

The show features two songs by American alternative rock band They Might Be Giants from the original series, including the opening theme song, in which a variant of a Mickey Mouse Club chant ("Meeska Mooska Mickey Mouse!") is used to make the Clubhouse appear, and "Hot Dog!", which echoes Mickey's first spoken words in the 1929 short The Karnival Kid.

== Characters ==
=== Main characters ===
- Mickey Mouse (voiced by Bret Iwan): The optimistic and easygoing leader of the Clubhouse Friends. He is Donald's best friend, Minnie's boyfriend, and is very patient and caring, especially towards his pet dog, Pluto.
- Minnie Mouse (voiced by Kaitlyn Robrock): Mickey's loving and quick-thinking girlfriend who loves bows. She is often prone to being put in over-the-top experiences.
  - Figaro (vocal effects provided by Frank Welker): Minnie's pet cat originally from the 1940 film, Pinocchio.
- Donald Duck (voiced by Tony Anselmo): Mickey's short-tempered, but good-natured best friend and co-leader. He is often shown to display a short temper that is easily provoked.
  - Sparky (vocal effects provided by Dee Bradley Baker): Donald's stuffed lion.
- Daisy Duck (voiced by Tress MacNeille): Donald's girlfriend and Minnie's best friend, who is prone to getting distracted and being talkative. However, she does mean well, and she also knows how to solve many problems and mysteries.
  - Sheep (vocal effects provided by Bill Farmer): Daisy Bo Peep's sheep.
  - Francis (vocal effects provided by Dee Bradley Baker): Daisy's pet frog.
- Goofy (voiced by Bill Farmer): Mickey's innocent and clumsy, but well-meaning friend. Being the clumsy guy he is, Goofy is often the source of most of the slapstick presented in this series.
  - Mr. Pettibone (vocal effects provided by Frank Welker): Goofy's pet kitten.
- Pluto (vocal effects provided by Bill Farmer): Mickey's adventurous pet dog.
- Toodles: A small, flying, Mickey-shaped robot extension of the Mousekedoer who delivers the Mouseketools for every episode. Despite being voiced by Rob Paulsen in the original series, Toodles has not spoken yet in this series.
- Little Helper (vocal effects provided by Dee Bradley Baker): A small robot with a hand resembling the Handy Helpers that was built by Professor Von Drake. It moves around on wheels and learns to help the gang in various ways.

=== Recurring characters ===
- Pete (voiced by Jim Cummings): Pete is a large cat who is a friend and occasional foe of Mickey's depending on the alter ego. Some of his alter egos have appeared as Mystery Mouskepals.
  - Buster (vocal effects provided by Dee Bradley Baker): Pete's pet bullfrog.
- Professor Ludwig Von Drake (voiced by Corey Burton): Professor Von Drake is a genius inventor who creates many gadgets for Mickey and his friends to use including Toodles and Little Helper.
  - SPOTS (vocal effects provided by Dee Bradley Baker): Professor Von Drake's pet robot dog.
- Clarabelle Cow (voiced by April Winchell): Clarabelle is a cow who is the proprietor of a supermarket called the Moo Mart. She also has different alter egos with some of them being Mystery Mousekepals.
  - Clarabelle's chickens (vocal effects provided by Dee Bradley Baker & Kaitlyn Robrock): A flock of six chickens owned by Clarabelle.
- Chip 'n' Dale (voiced by Tress MacNeille and Corey Burton respectively): Chip and Dale are a duo of chipmunks, the former portrayed as safe, focused, and thoughtful, and the latter being more laid-back, dim-witted, and impetuous. They also have different alter egos as Mystery Mousekepals.
- Willie the Giant (voiced by Brock Powell): A friendly, immature, and dimwitted giant.
- Clara Cluck (vocal effects provided by Kaitlyn Robrock): A hen who mostly speaks chicken language.
- Hilda (voiced by April Winchell): A female hippopotamus who plays several sports and has different alter egos as a Mystery Mousekepal.
  - Leapin' Leonardo (vocal effects provided by Brock Powell): Hilda's pet frog.
- The Laughing Loft (voiced by Stephen Stanton): A newly added second floor to the Clubhouse, which autologically laughs. It can be accessed by summoning the Wacky Tube with the Wacky Tube song.
- Farfus (vocal effects provided by Jan Johns): A playful purple dragon who previously debuted in Mickey Mouse Funhouse.
- Coco the Monkey (vocal effects provided by Dee Bradley Baker): Goofy's monkey friend from the jungle who was originally seen in the original series.
- Baby Elephant (vocal effects provided by Dee Bradley Baker) A baby elephant that first appears as a Mouseketool. It might be implied to be Bubbles from the original Clubhouse series. The Baby Elephant later appeared as a Mystery Mousekepal in "Daisylocks and the Three Bears" when it was summoned to help wake Papa Bear.
- Duffy the Disney Bear: Mickey's teddy bear. He had previously only been depicted in select theme parks and merchandise and is scheduled to get his own show.
- Cuckoo-Loca (voiced by Nika Futterman): A wind-up cuckoo bird who lives in Minnie's Clubhouse. She previously debuted in Minnie's Bow-Toons.
- The Three Bears: A family of three bears.
  - Papa Bear (vocal effects provided by Bill Farmer):
  - Mama Bear (vocal effects provided by Dee Bradley Baker):
  - Baby Bear (vocal effects provided by Dee Bradley Baker):
- Gophers (vocal effects provided by Dee Bradley Baker): A trio of gophers who originally lived in the holes that were accidentally used for the golf holes. One gopher was the Mystery Mousekepal in "SPOTS the Beagle-Bot" when Pluto had to teach SPOTS how to point at it. The gophers also appeared in "Mickey's Country Farm".
- Martian Mickey (voiced by Bret Iwan): The Martian counterpart of Mickey Mouse who lives on Mars.
  - Martian Minnie (voiced by Kaitlyn Robrock): The Martian counterpart of Minnie Mouse who lives on Mars.
  - Pluto from Pluto (vocal effects provided by Bill Farmer): The titular pet of Martian Mickey and Martian Minnie.
- Horace Horsecollar (voiced by Bill Farmer): A horse. In "Minnie's Rubber Ducky Doozy", Horace appeared as a Mystery Mousekepal named Horace Seahorse who is fluent in seahorse language and is shown to be half-seahorse.
- Millie and Melody Mouse (voiced by Vivian Vencer and Stella Edwards respectively): Minnie's nieces. They first appear in "Mickey's Movie Night" as the Mystery Mousekepals where they keep everyone at Picture Pete's Drive-In Movie Theater entertained while Picture Pete works on winding up the Kansas City Mickey film reel.
- Baby Red Bird (vocal effects provided by Tress MacNeille): A little red baby bird who previously appeared in the original series.
  - Sissy Red Bird (vocal effects provided by Kaitlyn Robrock): Baby Red Bird's little sister.
  - Mama Red Bird (vocal effects provided by April Winchell): Baby Red Bird and Sissy Red Bird's mother.
- Bees (vocal effects provided by Dee Bradley Baker): A swarm of bees whom Donald once angered. They were also the Mystery Mousekepals in "Home Aloners".
- Owl (vocal effects provided by Brock Powell): An owl.

=== Guest characters ===
- Cat Family: A family of cats that Pluto builds a bed for in his doghouse.
  - Mama Cat (vocal effects provided by Kaitlyn Robrock):
  - Kittens (vocal effects provided by Dee Bradley Baker):
- Mousekedoer Voice Announcer (voiced by Dee Bradley Baker): The Mousekedoer's A.I. voice.
- Go-Getter Van (voiced by Tress MacNeille): A hi-tech van that serves as transportation for the Go-Getters. It has an A.I. system.
- Seahorses (vocal effects provided by Dee Bradley Baker): A trio of seahorses that live under the water.
- Wormy the Worm (voiced by Dee Bradley Baker): A talking earthworm who previously debuted in the interstitial Mickey Mouse Mixed-Up Adventures spin-off Chip 'n Dale's Nutty Tales.
- Clam (voiced by Dee Bradley Baker): A clam that lives underwater.
- Squeakers (vocal effects provided by Brock Powell): A bat who previously debuted in Mickey Mouse Funhouse.
- Frogs (vocal effects provided by Dee Bradley Baker): A bunch of frogs who live near Donald's Clubhouse.
- Piggies (vocal effects provided by Dee Bradley Baker): A group of pigs.
- Goat (vocal effects provided by April Winchell): A goat.
- Lasso Lucy (voiced by Megan Hilty): A cowgirl who is Daisy's hero.
  - Pancho the Bull (vocal effects provided by Dee Bradley Baker): Lasso Lucy's pet bull.

== Clubhouses ==
Unlike the original series, the other members of the Sensational Six besides Mickey each have their own clubhouse, each being themed around them and more being added in later episodes.

- Mickey's Clubhouse: The original clubhouse with a Mickey-head-shaped top floor. In the reboot, some new details have been added in certain parts, including an entirely new floor on the inside known as the Laughing Loft. Mickey and his friends are able to travel to it via summoning the Wacky Tube, and a machine can pick out different games to play.
- Minnie's Clubhouse: A new clubhouse resembling one of her shoes with her bow on top. The interior is entirely pink and features heart and bow motifs. Cuckoo-Loca's birdhouse from Minnie's Bow-Toons and Mickey Mouse Mixed-Up Adventures also appears in the clubhouse.
- Martian Mickey's Clubhouse: A clubhouse on Mars that is made out of Martian bubbles that do not break as easy as Earth bubbles. It is not magical like Mickey and Minnie's clubhouse.
- Donald's Clubhouse: A new clubhouse located in the center of a pond. It resembles a boat and has Donald's hat on top.
- Goofy's Clubhouse: A new clubhouse that looks like Goofy's hat. The interior has equipment for Goofy's magic tricks. Like Martian Mickey's clubhouse, it is not magical.
- Daisy's Clubhouse: A clubhouse that looks like a flower in a purple pot.

== Episodes ==
=== Series overview ===
Season	Episodes	Originally released	
Season	Episodes	First released	Last released
1	29	July 21, 2025	July 30, 2026
2	TBA	September 30, 2026	TBA

=== Season 1 (2025–26) ===
No. overall	No. in season	Title	Directed by	Written by	Mystery Mousekepal (Note: In "Mickey's Country Fair", the Mystery Mousekepal is called the Mystery Mousekepartner.)	Original release date	Prod. code	U.S. viewers (millions)
1	1	"Mickey's New Helper"	Broni Likomanov	Kim Duran	Willie The Giant	July 21, 2025	103	N/A
Mickey and Professor Von Drake introduce Minnie, Donald, Daisy, Goofy, and Pluto to Professor Von Drake's latest creation, Little Helper. When Little Helper accidentally flies away in the Glove Balloon, the Clubhouse Friends need your help to save Little Helper. Mouseketools: A giant candy cane; a spy glass; shape stickers; the Mystery Mousekepal (Willie the Giant)
2	2	"Clarabelle's New Coop"	Broni Likomanov	Lisa Kettle	Tow Truck Pete	July 22, 2025	104	N/A
Clarabelle enlists the viewer and the Clubhouse Friends into repairing a chicken coop after her wheelbarrow hit a hole and sent one of the watermelons en route to the Moo Market into it. Mouseketools: A bucket with a rope tied to it; a xylophone; a handy fishing pole; the Mystery Mousekepal (Tow Truck Pete)
3	3	"Goofy's Sock Hunt"	Jeff Gordon	Mike Kubat	Animal Rescuer Hilda	July 23, 2025 (Note: This episode was released on Disney+ on July 22, 2025.)	101	N/A
Goofy can't find some of his socks and enlists his friends and the viewer to help look for them. After some searching, they find the missing socks in Pluto's doghouse and being used as a bed for some cats with other things inside as they come up with a solution to get the cats out. Mouseketools: A wind-up toy plane; a doggy treat; a light stick; the Mystery Mousekepal (Animal Rescuer Hilda)
4	4	"Puppy Pluto"	Broni Likomanov	Madeline "Moop" Khare	Locksmith Goofy	July 24, 2025	102	N/A
Professor Von Drake has invented the Itty Bitty Baby Ray. It ends up being tested on Pluto, turned into a baby. Having misplaced his glasses, Von Drake eventually turns into a baby as well. Mickey enlists the Clubhouse Friends and the viewer in getting into his lab to retrieve the glasses. Mouseketools: A handheld vacuum; a pogo stick; a flashlight; the Mystery Mousekepal (Locksmith Goofy)
5	5	"Goofy Pizza"	Jeff Gordon	Kim Duran	Farfus	July 25, 2025	105	N/A
Goofy has a craving for pizza. His friends and the viewer help to find the ingredients needed to make a pizza for Goofy called the Sure-To-Please-Ya Hot Dog Pizza. When all the ingredients are gathered, the final step is to light the pizza oven. Mouseketools: A giant net; a trick-or-treat bag; Molly the Mallet; the Mystery Mousekepal (Farfus the Dragon)
6	6	"Minnie's Tune Train"	Broni Likomanov	Lisa Kettle	Skating Champ Hilda	August 1, 2025	106	N/A
Professor Von Drake gifts a calliope car for the Clubhouse Choo-Choo train; Minnie performs a song; and she, Mickey, and the viewer help friends finish chores to join in. Mouseketools: Balloons; a trampoline; a giant straw; the Mystery Mousekepal (Skating Champ Hilda)
7	7	"Please the Bees"	Jeff Gordon	Mike Kubat	Beekeeper Clarabelle	August 8, 2025	107	N/A
While flying his kite, Donald accidentally crashes it into a tree which ends up causing a beehive to fall and anger three bees that live in it. The Clubhouse Friends and the viewer work to find a way to please them which leads them to call in an expert who is familiar with bees. Mouseketools: A kazoo; some paper lanterns; a watering can; the Mystery Mousekepal (Beekeeper Clarabelle)
8	8	"Minnie's Dinner Party"	Broni Likomanov	Madeline "Moop" Khare	Pasta Pete	August 15, 2025	108	N/A
Minnie is planning a special dinner party for Clara Cluck as her friends and the viewer help her plan and set up. Minnie makes a macaroni pasta dish, which still needs something special. Mouseketools: A candelabra; a red wagon; a handheld fan; the Mystery Mousekepal (Pasta Pete)
9	9	"Minnie's Backpack Adventure"	Broni Likomanov	Lisa Kettle	Aviator Clarabelle	September 5, 2025	110	N/A
The Clubhouse Friends and the viewer go on a hike to Goofy Rock, passing through the Jungle River, the Banana Bluffs, and Cloudy Canyon. Mouseketools: A giant muffin tray; earmuffs; suction cup shoes; the Mystery Mousekepal (Aviator Clarabelle)
10	10	"Mickey's Mail Mix-Up"	Jeff Gordon	Steve Lightner	Crossing Guard Clara Cluck	October 10, 2025	109	N/A
A lot of mail comes to the Clubhouse and Mickey, Minnie, Pluto, and the viewer work to get the mail (or as we say in British, post) to their respective recipients (their friends). Mouseketools: A ball of yarn; a baby elephant; a magnet; the Mystery Mousekepal (Crossing Guard Clara Cluck)
11	11	"Daisy Can't Say"	Broni Likomanov	Mike Kubat	Willie The Giant	October 27, 2025	112	N/A
A frog show is coming up, with Hilda's frog Leonardo and Farmer Pete's frog Buster competing. While training her frog Francis, Daisy loses her voice. Her friends and the viewer work to gather the ingredients needed to heal her throat. Mouseketools: A bunch of floaty balloons; a small bowl; some paper and crayons; the Mystery Mousekepal (Willie the Giant)
12	12	"Minnie Mouse Clubhouse"	Jeff Gordon	Kim Duran	Super Tracker Pluto	October 28, 2025	111	N/A
The viewer, Mickey, Goofy, Donald, Daisy, and Professor Von Drake help Minnie establish her clubhouse that has the stuff she needs as well as Cuckoo-Loca's cuckoo clock. Minnie gets an unexpected visit from a baby bear (upon paying attention to it for a few seconds), and she and Mickey help get it back to its family. Mouseketools: A chart of animal paw prints; a cuddly blanket; spring shoes; the Mystery Mousekepal (Super Tracker Pluto)
13	13	"The Ice Cream Mystery"	Jeff Gordon	Madeline "Moop" Khare	Musicians Chip And Dale	October 29, 2025	113	N/A
It is Ice Cream Day at Mickey Park. Unfortunately, his friends Goofy, Donald, and Clarabelle show up stating that all the ice cream is gone. Mickey becomes Agent M and he needs the viewer's help - and the Go-Getters, of course - to find the missing ice cream. The Go-Getters contact Agent M with his Secret Spy Shoe Phone (each time they need him and his help), and the trail leads the Go-Getters to Pete's Junkyard. Mouseketools: A giant snowball from Mistletoe Mountain; a remote control with a red button; a large peppermint candy; the Mystery Mousekepal (Musicians Chip and Dale)
14	14	"Say Cheese"	Broni Likomanov	Steve Lightner	Snow Cone Pete	October 30, 2025	114	N/A
The Clubhouse Friends and the viewer pay a visit to their respective locations to have its picture on the Friendship Wall. Minnie's favorite location is Sunflower Fields, Donald's favorite location is a desert, Daisy's favorite location is the underground grotto in a lake, and Goofy's favorite location is a waterfall as Pete tries to get into each of the photographs. At the end, Mickey's other friends come to the Clubhouse for Palapalooza, and Mickey realizes that only one picture is missing and they forgot to take the picture of his favorite place, but they can do it right now. The final picture has finally been taken and Mickey states that the Clubhouse is now his favorite place. But, most of all, his friends will be here with him. Mouseketools: A rubber spatula; Mickey's phone; a megaphone; the Mystery Mousekepal (Snow Cone Pete)
15	15	"Daisy's Hole in One Mystery"	Jeff Gordon	Lisa Kettle	Professor Von Drake	October 31, 2025	115	N/A
Daisy invites the viewer and everyone to go golfing with her at the golf course. As they go through each course, they soon come across a lot of holes dug by three gophers. Mouseketools: An umbrella; a handy fishing pole; a spy glass; the Mystery Mousekepal (Professor Von Drake)
16	16	"Mickey and Pluto Go Camping"	Broni Likomanov	Ashley Mendoza	Lumberjack Hilda	November 7, 2025	116	N/A
Mickey has some great news to tell his best friend Pluto: they're going on a camping trip to Friendship Lake as the viewer comes along with them. But they miss their friends Donald, Daisy, Minnie, and Goofy and they miss him as well. This leads the two best friends to an unlikely reunion at Friendship Lake. It has started to rain and Mickey and Pluto get inside the tent to dry. When it stops raining, they see a star. Mouseketools: A whistle; pink ribbons; two giant wooden spoons; the Mystery Mousekepal (Lumberjack Hilda)
17	17	"Martian Mickey's Clubhouse"	Jeff Gordon	Story by : Mike Kubat; Written by : Charlie Price	Lady Moo Moo	November 14, 2025	117	N/A
The viewer, Mickey, Minnie, Goofy, and Pluto head to Mars to help Martian Mickey, Martian Minnie, and Pluto from Pluto build a new clubhouse after their spacehouse was destroyed by a sandstorm. Donald and Daisy stay behind at the clubhouse to commence Mission Control. While Mickey, Minnie, Goofy, and Pluto go to Mars, they even pick up some snacks from Space Pete along the way. Mouseketools: Goofy's bouncy shoes; a watering can; a Martian bubble wand; the Mystery Mousekepal (Lady Moo Moo)
18	18	"Martian Mishap"	Broni Likomanov	Madeline "Moop" Khare	Pilot Donald	December 3, 2025 (Note: This episode was released on Disney+ on November 18, 2025.)	118	N/A
Martian Mickey is coming to Earth to obtain some spices needed to make his Yum Blatz Pie for Martian Minnie at their Martian clubhouse. Unfortunately, his spaceship crash-lands enough to break it into three pieces. The Clubhouse Friends need your help to put the spaceship back together and gather the spices before Martian Mickey goes back to the planet Mars and cooks up his Yum Blatz Pie for tonight's dinner party. Mouseketools: A large bendy straw; a leaf blower; a giant picnic basket; the Mystery Mousekepal (Pilot Donald)
19	19	"Minnie's Rubber Ducky Doozy"	Jeff Gordon	Lisa Kettle	Horace Seahorse	January 9, 2026	121	N/A
Everyone meets up with Minnie at her clubhouse where she announces her plans to do a rubber ducky parade as part of the Rubber Ducky Festival at Star Lake that is attended by Clarabelle, Pete, and Willie the Giant. They need your help to set up Star Lake for the rubber ducky parade. But, Goofy Jr. goes missing and Captain Minnie sends the rest of the gang on the search for it, in an underwater submarine. Mouseketools: A pasta bowtie; Goofy's magician handkerchiefs; giant tongs; the Mystery Mousekepal (Horace Seahorse)
20	20	"SPOTS the Beagle-Bot"	Broni Likomanov	Mike Kubat	A Gopher	February 6, 2026	120	N/A
Professor Von Drake has invented a robotic dog named SPOTS the Beagle-Bot which serves as a playmate for Pluto. Unfortunately, Pluto starts to get jealous of SPOTS when it improves at the stuff that Pluto enjoys, and Pluto eventually hasn't paid any attention to SPOTS because he is Professor Von Drake's best robot puppy pal and Pluto's as well. The rest of the gang and the viewer are then ready to gear up and show SPOTS how to be a hot diggity dog. Mouseketools: A metal wrench; a name tag; a wooden stick; the Mystery Mousekepal (A gopher)
21	21	"Mickey's Movie Night"	Jeff Gordon	Steve Lightner	Millie and Melody Mouse	March 30, 2026	119	N/A
Mickey and his friends are visiting Picture Pete's drive-in movie theater to watch a movie called Kansas City Mickey, but Picture Pete needs the viewer, Mickey, and his friends' help to get things done around the drive-in movie theater before the movie can start. Meanwhile, Chip and Dale try to ask Donald what the green button in his car does. Millie and Melody Mouse entertain the audience with a song "Head, Shoulders, Knees and Toes" while Picture Pete gets the film ready. Mouseketools: A unicycle; a bunch of magnets; three socks; the Mystery Mousekepal (Millie and Melody Mouse)
22	22	"Clubhouse Carnival"	Broni Likomanov	Ashley Mendoza	Coco the Monkey	March 31, 2026	122	N/A
Clarabelle Cow is opening up a carnival at the Clubhouse, where visitors pay, play games and go on rides, and it has a new ride: The Mouseke-slide. Everyone can't wait to ride it. But before they do, Donald's toy lion Sparky goes missing. So, the viewer and everyone help Donald find Sparky before they go down the new Mouseke-slide while contending with other mishaps. Eventually, the switch has started to break apart when Clarabelle tries to make the new Mouseke-slide appear, so they use the glitter glue to put it back together, making it as good as new. Mouseketools: A giant marshmallow; glitter glue; beach towels; the Mystery Mousekepal (Coco the Monkey)
23	23	"The Tale of the Moo-Maids"	Broni Likomanov	Madeline "Moop" Khare	Wormy the Worm	April 1, 2026	124	N/A
Mickey and his friends go to the beach for some fun in the sun at Mickey Lake. While they are there, Goofy accidentally breaks Daisy's pearl necklace while trying to go fishing and the pearls get lost in Mickey Lake. So, the viewer, Mickey and his friends go underwater to find the ten missing pearls. While they are down there, they meet some Moo-Maids and their leader Sea Queen Clarabelle. Sea Queen Clarabelle agrees to help find the pearls while Mickey and his friends agree to help find Sea Queen Clarabelle's missing crown. Mouseketools: A ball of yarn; a butterfly net; glow sticks; the Mystery Mousekepal (Wormy the Worm)
24	24	"Daisylocks and the Three Bears"	Jeff Gordon	Kim Duran	A Baby Elephant	April 2, 2026	123	N/A
While Mickey is reading a story to his stuffed bear toy Duffy, Daisylocks comes to the clubhouse and asks for some help in finding her way back to her cottage after getting lost picking some blueberries for her friends, the Three Bears. Along the way they and the viewer meet and help some friends. Mouseketools: A small trampoline; a big fluffy pillow; a shiny gold coin; the Mystery Mousekepal (A baby elephant)
25	25	"A Dragon Tale"	Broni Likomanov	Lisa Kettle	Castle guards Chip and Dale	April 3, 2026	126	N/A
Mickey and his friends are heading to Queen Clarabelle's castle for a tea party, but Queen Clarabelle arrived at a clubhouse with a problem. There is a fire-breathing dragon in front of the castle entrance and wouldn’t move so no one can get in or out. So, the viewer, Mickey and his friends go through the enchanted forest to Queen Clarabelle's castle to help move the dragon so that Queen Clarabelle can have her tea party as they also contend with a stuck Pete and as well as a dark part of the enchanted forest. When they get there, they see that the dragon is their friend Farfus who is fast asleep on the drawbridge as they work to wake him up so that the tea party can commence. Mouseketools: A two-handed handy crane; fireflies; a bathtub; the Mystery Mousekepal (Castle Guards Chip and Dale)
26	26	"The Late, Late Show"	Broni Likomanov	Written by : Sascha Paladino; Story by : Mark Drop	Chef Pete	April 10, 2026	TBA	N/A
Professor Von Drake tells Mickey and his friends that late that night is going to be a meteor shower. So, the viewer, Mickey and his friends do everything they can to stay awake so that they can watch the meteor shower. The things they do include singing a song, making shadow puppets, dancing the conga, looking for nighttime animals, and eating a snack. Mouseketools: A flashlight; a conga drum; a seesaw; the Mystery Mousekepal (Chef Pete)
27	27	"Donald's Clubhouse Sleepover"	Jeff Gordon	Mike Kubat	Donald's toy lion Sparky	June 5, 2026 (Note: This episode was released on Disney+ on April 22, 2026.)	127	N/A
Donald is running out of space to put things, so Professor Von Drake surprised Donald with his very own clubhouse near the water. To celebrate the new clubhouse, Mickey and his friends decide to have a sleepover in it. But Donald is having trouble going to sleep and keeps waking everyone up (Sometimes he's been always trying!), and it's to the viewers at home to help Mickey and his friends figure out how to get Donald to go to sleep so that they can also go to sleep. Mouseketools: An anchor; earmuffs; a music box; the Mystery Mousekepal (Donald's toy lion Sparky)
28	28	"The Candy Cottage"	Jeff Gordon	Ashley Mendoza	Sheep-Herding Pluto	July 3, 2026	128	N/A
Mickey, Minnie and Donald set out to get some blueberries in the enchanted forest. While on the way they see a candy cottage, and Donald starts to eat the candy. Then they discover that Wizard Pete lives in the cottage and is unhappy that Donald ate some of it. Wizard Pete then puts Donald under a sleeping spell and says that the only way he will wake him up is if Mickey and Minnie fix the damage that Donald caused. So, the viewer, Mickey and Minnie set off to collect the things needed to fix Wizard Pete's cottage. They meet friends along the way. Mouseketools: A wagon; a loaf of bread; a suction cup bow and arrow; the Mystery Mousekepal (Sheep-Herding Pluto)
29	29	"Mickey's Country Farm" (Note: This episode is a 46-minute television special.) "Mickey Mouse Clubhouse+: Mickey's Country Farm"	Jeff Gordon & Broni Likomanov	Mike Kubat	Piggy-Herding Pluto	July 30, 2026	TBA	N/A
Mickey decides to take the viewer and everyone to the country to visit his farm. After they arrive at the farm and get new farm vehicles from Professor Von Drake, Daisy decides that they should make a country farm fair, hoping that her favorite cowgirl Lasso Lucy will come for a visit. Things they do are making a track for a tractor parade, making a lot of haybales, collecting apples for pie, and making a track for a pig race. Meanwhile, Pete tries to grow a giant watermelon to bring to the farm. While making the country fair, Daisy finds that every time she tries to help, she just makes it worse. Later, Pete's giant watermelon goes on a rampage, but Daisy used her tractor to smash it, but then all the seeds grow more watermelons. Daisy gets an idea, and they make a watermelon themed country fair. The watermelon country fair was so unique that Lasso Lucy shows up. Mouseketools: A rope lasso; a wheelbarrow; a fruit picker; the Mystery Mousekepartner (Piggy-Herding Pluto)

=== Season 2 (2026–) ===
No. overall	No. in season	Title	Directed by	Written by	Mystery Mousekepal	Original release date	Prod. code	U.S. viewers (millions)
30	1	"The Big Acorn Hunt"	Jeff Gordon	Steve Lightner	Professor Von Drake	September 30, 2026	TBA	N/A
Chip and Dale are going to go on a big acorn hunt to collect acorns for the coming winter using Professor Von Drake's new acorn collecting machine, but before they can start, Dale gets the sniffles. So, the viewer, Mickey and his friends will help get the acorns while Chip helps Dale with his sniffles. Mouseketools: A giant baseball mitt; Mickey's phone; a big blanket; the Mystery Mousekepal (Professor Von Drake)
31	2	"Mickey's Get-Up-and-Go Day"	Broni Likomanov	Lisa Kettle	Swimming Hilda	September 30, 2026	TBA	N/A
On a nice sunny day, Mickey decides to have a pool party. But before the party can start, they need to do some chores to get ready which include clean up (mow the lawn, rake and sweep), set up (make snacks, put out lawn furniture, and get the pool toys) and suit up (put on their swimsuits and grab some towels). So, the viewer, Mickey and his friends sing, dance and use Mouseketools to get the chores done so they can have their pool party. Mouseketools: Two giant forks; Molly the mallet; a floaty ring; the Mystery Mousekepal (Swimming Hilda)
32	3	"Three Knights Are We"	Jeff Gordon	Mark Drop	Mountaineer Hilda	September 30, 2026	TBA	N/A
Queen Clarabelle is looking for some new knights, so Minnie, Daisy and Goofy decide to try to become Queen Clarabelle's new knights. To become a knight, the viewer, Minnie, Daisy and Goofy need to pass three challenges and prove they are strong, clever and brave. The challenges are to prove you strong by pulling the drawbridge up, to prove you are clever by climbing up the castle wall and grab a flag, and finally to prove you are brave by climbing a tower and walking across an old bridge to save some friends. Mouseketools: A comfy recliner chair; binoculars; a camp lantern; the Mystery Mousekepal (Mountaineer Hilda)
33	4	"Home Aloners"	Broni Likomanov	Kim Duran	Bees	September 30, 2026	TBA	N/A
After making a lot of paper airplanes, Mickey decides to take them to Mickey Park and put on an airshow. The viewer, Mickey, Goofy and Little Helper went and got their friends at Minnie's clubhouse, but when they left the wind blew a paper airplane away. Little Helper went to get it, but in doing so he and Pluto end up locked inside Minnie's Clubhouse. While playing with the paper airplanes, they realize that Little Helper was nowhere to be seen, so they decide to look for him. Meanwhile, Pluto and Little Helper have some fun in the clubhouse while waiting for their friends like make some food and play music. Mouseketools: Mickey's toolbox; balloons; plastic hoops; the Mystery Mousekepal (Bees)
34	5	"The Friendship Day Adventure"	Jeff Gordon	Steve Lightner	Treasure Seeker Clarabelle	September 30, 2026	TBA	N/A
It's friendship day at the clubhouse, and Mickey is having trouble figuring out what gift to give Minnie. Mickey then learns from Professor Von Drake about a crystal called the friendship day heart. Von Drake also said if you find it on friendship day it will make a sparkly lightshow for the best of friends. So, Mickey decides to go on an adventure to find the friendship day heart for Minnie. But when Mickey makes it to where the friendship day heart is, he triggers a booby trap and get stuck. So, Mickey calls Minnie who then goes on an adventure with the viewer to help get Mickey free. Mouseketools: A rope lasso; a hockey stick; a giant jar of honey; the Mystery Mousekepal (Treasure Seeker Clarabelle)
35	6	"A Goofy Clubhouse"	Broni Likomanov	Story by : Madeline "Moop" Khare; Written by : Lisa Kettle	Wizard Pete	September 30, 2026	TBA	N/A
Goofy always wanted his own clubhouse, so Professor Von Drake arrives with blueprints for Goofy's own clubhouse. Goofy then goes and builds it, and when his friends show up, they realize that Goofy build his clubhouse upside down. To help get Goofy's clubhouse right side up, Von Drake tries to use a potion he has, but he ran out of it. To get more, the viewer, Mickey, Minnie and Goofy travel to magic island to find the flip flop tree to get more potion. Mouseketools: A slide; a giant xylophone; a jar with a lid; the Mystery Mousekepal (Wizard Pete)
36	7	"The Haunted Halloween Hunt"	Jeff Gordon	Lisa Kettle	Vampire bats Chip and Dale	September 30, 2026	TBA	N/A
Today is Halloween. To celebrate Halloween, Mickey and his friends are going to Magic Island for Witch Clarabelle's haunted Halloween hunt. In this hunt, they have to find three magical Halloween items which are a floating jack-o-lantern with triangle eyes, a broom and a purple witch hat. If the viewer, Mickey and his friends can find all three magical Halloween items, they will get a special Halloween surprise, which is a Halloween party at the end. They use Toodles' special Halloween name (always remembered throughout the episode) because the holiday has arrived: Boo-dles. Mouseketools: Halloween Stickers; a skeleton key; a candy apple; the Mystery Mousekepal (Vampire bats Chip and Dale)
37	8	"Pete's Big Surprise"	Jeff Gordon	Ashley Mendoza	Minnie Mouse	October 30, 2026	TBA	TBD
It's Pete's birthday, so the viewer, Mickey and his friends want to surprise him with a really big present. But they want to surprise Pete, so they have to get it to Pete's farm market without Pete seeing it. With some Mouseketools and clever ideas, they managed to get the present to the farm market. When Pete opened his present with some help from Little Helper, it was revealed to be a new hammock. Mouseketools: A box of crayons; four skateboards; a giant rubber band; the Mystery Mousekepal (Minnie Mouse)
38	9	"The Missing Songbird"	Broni Likomanov	Mike Kubat	Co-Pilots Chip and Dale	November 6, 2026	TBA	TBD
Queen Clarabelle comes to the clubhouse with her songbirds to sing her morning song (the first song she sings when she wakes up) for the clubhouse friends. But there is one problem, one of her songbirds has gone missing, and it's their friend Baby Red Bird. So, the viewer, Mickey and friends go check Baby Red Bird's 3 favorite places (a forest cave, a fruit orchard and the curving creek) to find him and bring him to Queen Clarabelle. Mickey and his friends found Baby Red Bird by the curving creek and also discovered that he didn't show up because he went home to be with his new baby sister. Mouseketools: A spyglass; a headlamp; a giant drinking straw; the Mystery Mousekepal (Co-Pilots Chip and Dale)
39	10	"Minnie's Pet Party"	Jeff Gordon	Ashley Mendoza	Cuckoo-Loca	November 13, 2026	TBA	TBD
Minnie is having a pet party at her clubhouse and everyone is bringing their pet (Mickey brings Pluto, Minnie brings Figaro, Daisy brings Captain Jumps-a-Lot, Donald brings Little Stinker, and Goofy brings Goldie). But while they were trying to get the pets ready for the party, Daisy accidentally messes with the machine and makes it go crazy which scares Pluto, Figaro and Captain Jumps-a-Lot away. With the help of the viewers, their friends and Mouseketools, Mickey, Minnie and Daisy need to find their missing pets in time for them to have their pet party. Mouseketools: A bunch of carrots; a baby carriage; a wind-up toy mouse; the Mystery Mousekepal (Cuckoo-Loca)
40	11	"Hot Dog Day"	Jeff Gordon	Lisa Kettle	Cuckoo-Loca	November 20, 2026 (Note: This episode was released on Disney+ on November 18, 2026.)	TBA	TBD
It is Hot Dog Day, and Mickey and his friends are going to have a hot dog party in Mickey Park. While having the party, their friend Willie shows up. He says he never had an official Hot Dog Day hot dog, but he can't stay to have one because he has to get his chicken, that he has with him, home to his barn in the clouds. Feeling bad that Willie can't join in the fun, they and the viewer decide to surprise Willie by bringing a giant hot dog for him and moving the party to his cloud. Mouseketools: Mickey's backpack; a long ribbon; the rescue copter; the Mystery Mousekepal (Cuckoo-Loca)
41	12	"The Twelve Pies of Christmas"	Broni Likomanov	Steve Lightner	Snowplow Pete	December 1, 2026	TBA	TBD
It's Christmas Eve, and Mickey and his friends are going to Minnie's clubhouse for a Christmas Eve party that she calls: The Twelve Pies of Christmas because she is making twelve different pies for the party and also plans to sing a song about the twelve pies. But there is a problem, it has snowed so much that Mickey, Donald, Goofy, Daisy and Pluto are snowed in and stuck in Mickey's clubhouse. So, they and the viewer have to figure out how to get through all the snow to get to Minnie's clubhouse for the party. Mouseketools: Three giant spoons; a light-up star tree topper; a holiday handy crane; the Mystery Mousekepal (Snowplow Pete)

== Mickey's Country Farm Songs ==
No.	Title	Original release date
1	"Mickey's Hoedown Throwdown"	July 27, 2026
2	"Mickey and Minnie Have a Farm"	July 27, 2026
3	"The Cow Wash"	July 27, 2026
4	"Mickey's Barnyard Orchestra"	July 27, 2026
5	"Mickey's Farm Chores"	July 27, 2026
6	"The Farmer in the Dell"	July 27, 2026
7	"Hey Diddle Diddle"	July 27, 2026
8	"Goofy's Britches Falling Down"	July 27, 2026
9	"The Country Style Song"	July 27, 2026
10	"Minnie Had a Little Lamb"	July 27, 2026

== Production ==
Mickey Mouse Clubhouse+ was announced at the Disney Jr. & Friends Playdate event at Disney California Adventure at Disneyland Resort on August 18, 2023, under the working title Mickey Mouse Clubhouse 2.0. Many of the production team and most of the voice cast from the original show return for the reboot. The animation is outsourced to Mikros Animation, OuiDo! Productions and Saffron!c. The series premiered on July 21, 2025 on Disney Jr. and is available to stream on Disney+. On August 8, 2025, it was announced that the series had received an early two-season renewal. Since November 2025, Mickey+ Shorts is produced by the same team.

A television special titled Mickey Mouse Clubhouse+: Mickey's Country Farm premiered on July 30, 2026 on Disney Jr. and the next day on Disney+. A short series titled Mickey Mouse Clubhouse+: Mickey's Country Farm Songs premiered three days before.

== Reception ==
=== Critical response ===
Alex Reif of Laughing Place said that Mickey Mouse Clubhouse+ is a reboot that remains true to the original series while introducing new elements. He noted that the show preserves the interactive storytelling, familiar characters, and gentle pacing that made the original popular with preschoolers. Reif highlighted additions such as Little Helper and the upgraded Mystery Mousekepal, which enhance engagement and promote counting, directions, and problem-solving. He praised the series for balancing nostalgia with fresh content, and suggested that new characters like Duffy the Disney Bear could further expand its appeal. Ashley Moulton of Common Sense Media gave Mickey Mouse Clubhouse+ a grade of three out of five stars, noting that the series features classic characters modeling teamwork while solving problems and learning together. She highlighted the show's positive messages about perseverance, asking for help, and other life lessons, and praised the characters as kind, helpful role models who demonstrate problem-solving skills. Moulton also noted the inclusion of brief interactive learning moments, such as counting or following a map, which add educational value.

=== Ratings ===
Mickey Mouse Clubhouse+ debuted on Disney+ as the biggest original Disney Junior launch on the platform to date. Nielsen Media Research, which records streaming viewership on certain American television screens, reported that it was the most-watched streaming title among audiences aged 2–5 during its premiere week. Mickey Mouse Clubhouse and Mickey Mouse Clubhouse+ accumulated a combined 20.3 billion minutes of viewing across linear television and streaming platforms between September 22, 2025, and September 20, 2026, ranking as the twelfth most-watched animated series during that period.

=== Accolades ===
Mickey Mouse Clubhouse+ was nominated for Outstanding Achievement in Children's Programming at the 2026 Television Critics Association Awards.

== In other media ==
=== Disney Jr. Live on Tour: Let's Play - The International Tour ===
- Starting on March 15, 2025, Mickey, Minnie, and Goofy appeared in the touring live-action arena show Disney Jr. Live on Tour: Let's Play. Through March 15 and March 16, 2025, the show was only premiered at the Royal Festival Hall in London, England and resumed their previous classic name and its last farewell appearance of the focused block and channel.
- Disney Jr. Live on Tour: Let's Play toured at the Etihad Arena in Abu Dhabi, UAE in June 6–8, 2025. It will do a Southeast Asian tour to promote the launch of Disney+ Hotstar in India, Indonesia, Malaysia, and Thailand and the show on Disney+ in Singapore and the Philippines such as the Sardar Vallabhbhai Patel Indoor Stadium in Mumbai, India and more stadiums in Jakarta, Bekasi, Kuala Lumpur, Singapore and more.

=== Mickey Mouse Clubhouse Live! ===
- Following the announcement, Disney California Adventure announced that the final performance of Disney Junior Dance Party would be permanently closed on March 23, 2025, and make way for California version of a new show in Disney Theater, while Disney's Hollywood Studios announced that the final performance of Disney Junior: Play and Dance! and Get Animated! on September 25, 2025, and along with the entire Animation Courtyard area, which will be permanently closed to make way for Florida version of a new show in Stage 1 Theater in The Walt Disney Studios Lot. On March 31, 2025, the show was announced to be Disney Jr. Mickey Mouse Clubhouse Live!, dedicated to Mickey Mouse Clubhouse and the upcoming reboot. The California version of the new show debuted on May 16, 2025 at Disney California Adventure, as part of Disneyland Resort's 70th anniversary celebration, while the Florida version of the new show debuted on May 26, 2026 at Disney's Hollywood Studios.

=== Mickey+ Shorts ===
- Mickey Mouse and his friends simply want to enjoy a normal day in the Clubhouse. But something completely unexpected happens with the Mousekedoer: its screen suddenly starts to shimmer like water. This pulls Mickey and his friends into various Disney Jr. worlds, where they join the characters living there to do things together.
