= Kaitlyn Robrock =

American voice actress (born 1983)

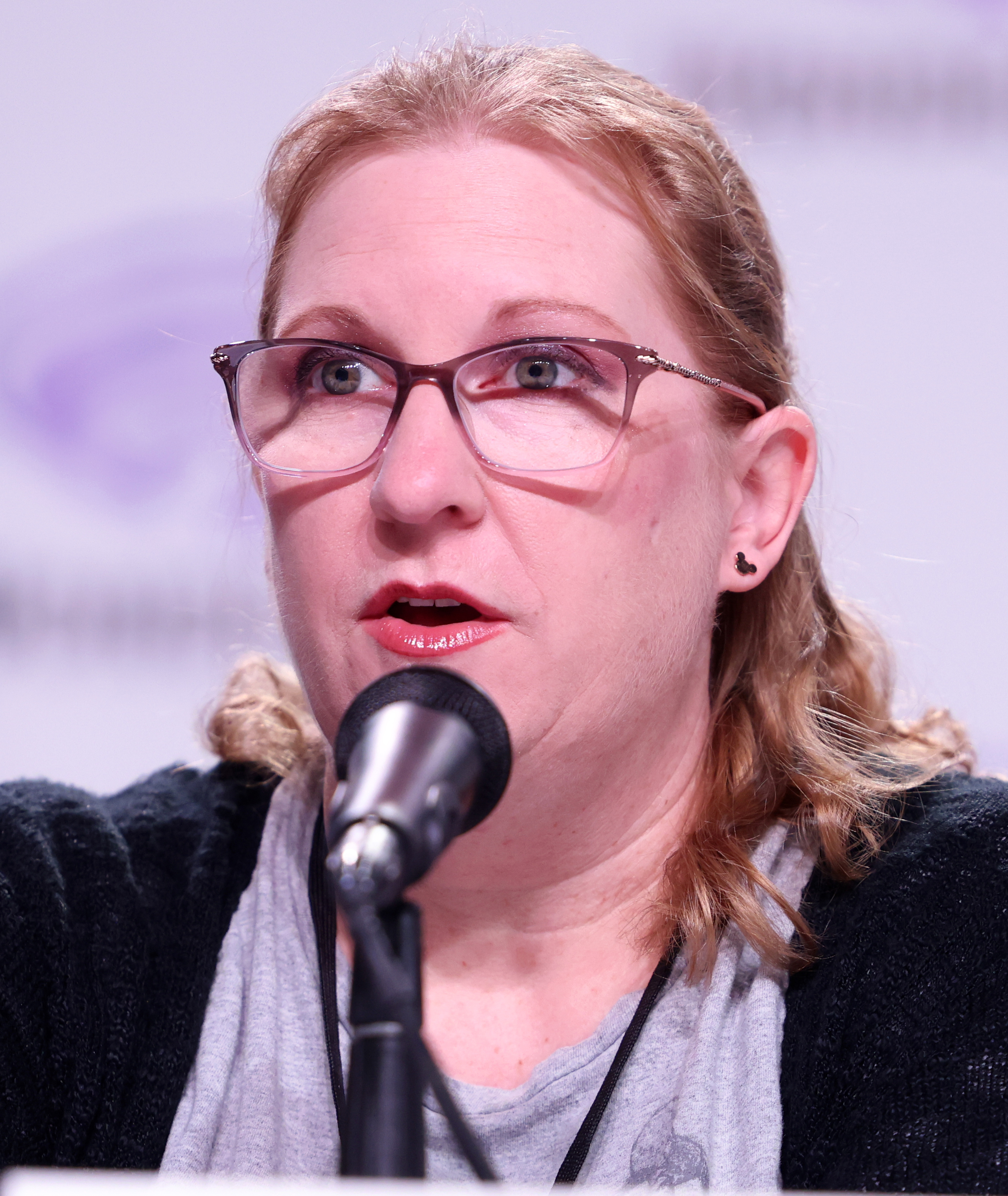
- Robrock in 2026
- Born: December 30, 1983 (age 42); San Diego, California, U.S.
- Occupation: Voice actress
- Years active: 2009–present

Kaitlyn Robrock (/ˈroʊbrɒk/ ROH-brok; born December 30, 1983) is an American voice actress. She is best known for her role as the current voice of Minnie Mouse, succeeding Russi Taylor following her death in 2019.

== Career ==
Robrock began working at Disneyland Resort in Anaheim, California as an entertainment host in November 2003, often working in Town Square as an attendant for the Disney characters. In 2013, she began providing background voices for the parks, including Buena Vista Street, Pandora – The World of Avatar, Tokyo Disneyland and Tokyo DisneySea, and Disneyland Paris' "It's a Small World".

Robrock's roles include Mrs. Budnick on Golan the Insatiable, various characters on the Cartoon Network series ThunderCats Roar and Roxie Guttman in the Netflix series Dead End: Paranormal Park. She voiced Tommy Goodman on the Adult Swim series Mr. Pickles and its spin-off Momma Named Me Sheriff. She also provided the voice of Retsuko's mother in the English dub of the Netflix anime series Aggretsuko.

In 2019, Robrock succeeded Russi Taylor as the longtime voice of Minnie Mouse, following Taylor's death in July of that year. Her first performances as Minnie were in two Disney Jr. Mickey Mouse shorts, Mickey Mouse and the Magical Snowy Holiday and Mickey Mouse and the Magical Holiday Bag.

== Filmography ==
=== Film ===
List of voice performances in feature films
Year	Title	Role	Notes
2010	The Drawn Together Movie: The Movie!	Smurfette	Uncredited
2014	A Million Ways to Die in the West	ADR	
2014	Lucy	ADR	
2016	The Boss	ADR	
2019	Frozen II	Additional voices	
2020	Alien Xmas	Elf Kid #3, Reindeer, Klepts	
2022	Tom and Jerry: Cowboy Up!	Betty	
2023	Once Upon a Studio	Minnie Mouse	

=== Animation ===
List of voice performances in animation
Year	Title	Role	Notes
2013–2015	Golan the Insatiable	Mrs. Budnick, Weather Lady	
2013–2018	Mr. Pickles	Tommy Goodman, Candy, additional voices	
2018–2019, 2022	JoJo's Bizarre Adventure	Shizuka Joestar, Mrs. Hazekura, Pinocchio	English dub
2018	Pickle and Peanut	Susan, additional voices	Ep: "Black Light Bowling"
2019–2023	Aggretsuko	Retsuko's Mother, additional voices	English dub
2019–2022	Amphibia	Felicia Sundew, Aquarium Show Hostess, additional voices	
2019–2021	Momma Named Me Sheriff	Tommy Goodman, Candy, additional voices	
2020	Doc McStuffins	Nanny, Arcade Woman	Ep: "Lost & Found"
2020	Blaze and the Monster Machines	Oola	Ep: "The Great Space Race"
2020	ThunderCats Roar	Gwen, Unicorns, Molly Lava, Moldians, Mrs. Gristidi, Mumm-rana, Schnorp, Mixer, Doorbell, Wristwatch, Eclipsorr, Luna	9 episodes
2020–2021	Mickey Mouse Mixed-Up Adventures	Minnie Mouse	
2020–2023	The Wonderful World of Mickey Mouse	Minnie Mouse, Fairy Godmother, Blue Fairy	
2021–present	Minnie's Bow-Toons	Minnie Mouse	
2021–2024	What If...?	Additional voices	3 episodes
2021–2025	Mickey Mouse Funhouse	Minnie Mouse, Martian Minnie	
2022	I Am Groot	Gangalorian Squirrel Bird	
2022–2025	Transformers: EarthSpark	Cadet Rosato, Taylor, additional voices	3 episodes
2022–2023	Deer Squad	Lady Fluffpot	Credited as Elizabeth Simmons
2024	The Elusive Samurai	Kazama Genba	English dub
2024–present	The Loud House	Beany Brewinski	3 episodes
2025–present	Mickey Mouse Clubhouse+	Minnie Mouse	
2025	Bat-Fam	Copperhead	
2026	Chainsmoker Cat	Penpenneko	
2026	Lego Disney Princess: Magical Mayhem	Abigail Gabble	

=== Video games ===
List of voice performances in video games
Year	Title	Role	Notes
2016	StarCraft II: Nova Covert Ops	Defenders Ghost #2	
2016	Dishonored 2	Witch	
2016	Lego Dimensions	Abby Yates	
2017	Dishonored: Death of the Outsider	Witches	
2020	Phantasy Star Online 2	Sarah	
2022	Lost Ark	Beatrice	Credited as Elizabeth Simmons
2022	Relayer	Venera, additional voices	
2022–present	Smite	Gazing Archon Medusa, Honey Bee Aphrodite, Lich Queen Bellona	
2022	Tower of Fantasy	Claudia	Credited as Elizabeth Simmons
2022	Disney Dreamlight Valley	Minnie Mouse	
2022	Goddess of Victory: Nikke	Helm, Cinderella / Anachiro	
2023	Fire Emblem Engage	Chloé	Credited as Elizabeth Simmons
2023	Fire Emblem Heroes	Chloé, Larum, Mamori Minamoto	Credited as Elizabeth Simmons
2023	Disney Illusion Island	Minnie Mouse	
2023	Disney Speedstorm	Minnie Mouse	
2026	Halloween: The Game	Annie Brackett	

Preceded by Russi Taylor	Voice of Minnie Mouse; 2020–present	Succeeded by Incumbent
