= Bret Iwan =

American voice actor (born 1982)

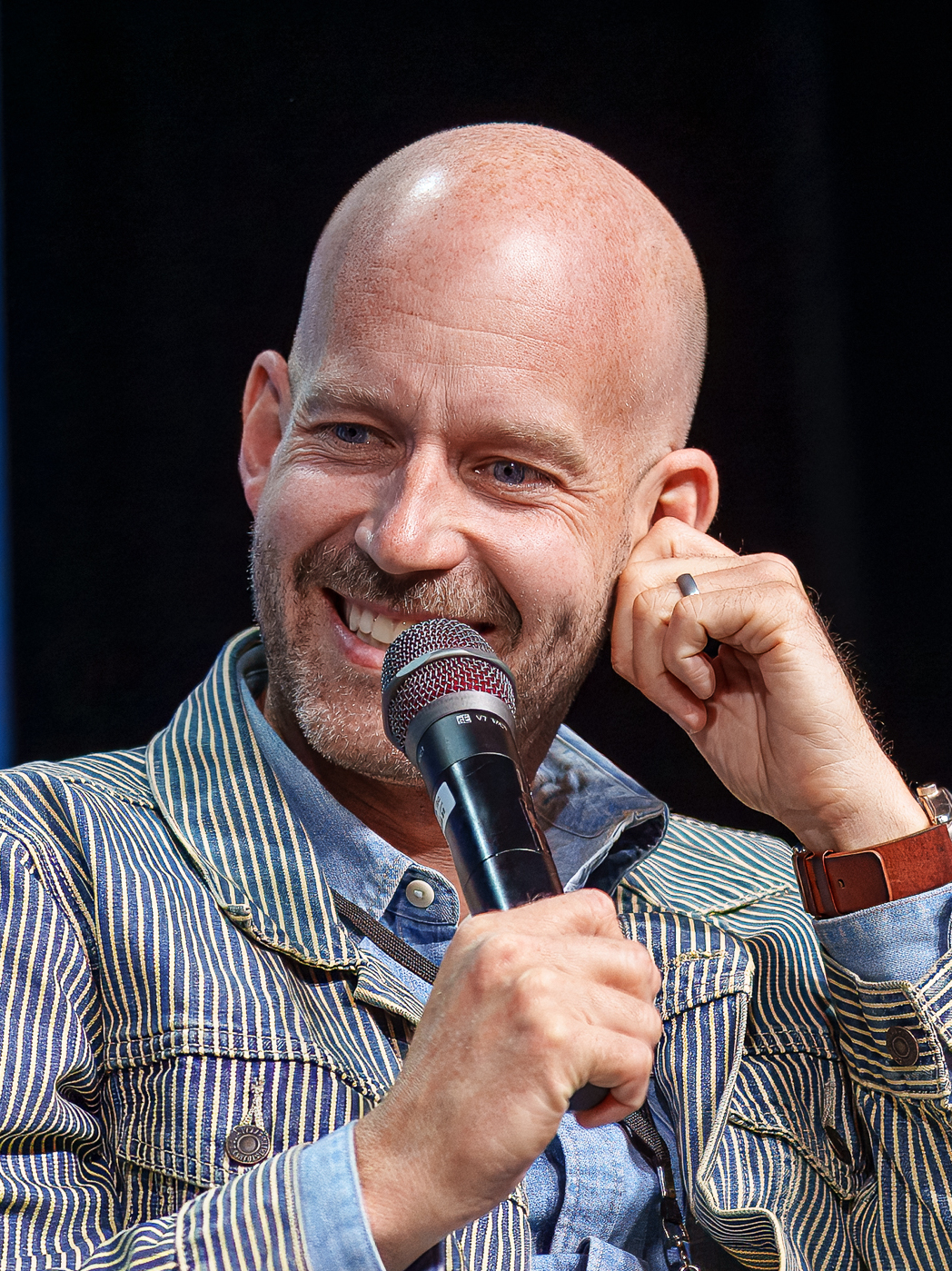
- Iwan at Animate! Orlando in 2025
- Born: Bret William Iwan; September 10, 1982 (age 44); Pasadena, California, U.S.
- Occupation: Voice actor
- Years active: 2009–present
- Spouse: Douglas Hoffman (m. 2021)

Bret William Iwan (born September 10, 1982) is an American voice actor and illustrator. Since 2009, he has been the official voice of Mickey Mouse from the universe of the same name, since the death of his previous voice actor Wayne Allwine.

== Early life ==
Iwan was born on September 10, 1982, and raised in Pasadena, California. He is the son of Bill and Fiona Iwan. He attended LeRoy High School in Le Roy, Illinois, from 1996 to 2000. He graduated from the Ringling College of Art and Design in Sarasota, Florida. Iwan eventually got a job as an illustrator at Hallmark.

== Career ==
Iwan was hired to voice Mickey Mouse and replace Wayne Allwine after his death from diabetes on May 18, 2009. Iwan had previously understudied for the role when Allwine was facing health difficulties and Iwan credits Allwine's archival work as providing excellent mentorship.

Iwan first recorded Mickey Mouse dialogue for the Disney's Animal Kingdom theme park as well as the 2009 shows Disney On Ice: Celebrations and Disney Live: Rockin' Road Show. He voiced Mickey Mouse in Have a Laugh!. He gave his first full performance as Mickey Mouse for the English version of the PlayStation Portable game Kingdom Hearts Birth by Sleep. He also gave his voice performance as Mickey Mouse in the Epic Mickey games.

His first voice-over work in a Disney Park was in the Animal Kingdom closing show "Adventurers' Celebration Gathering" and the Tomorrowland Transit Authority PeopleMover attraction at the Magic Kingdom in which, upon passing through Mickey's Star Traders, Mickey responds with his signature laugh and says: "That's right, it's outta this world!".

== Personal life ==
Iwan is openly gay, making him the first openly LGBTQ+ actor to voice Mickey Mouse. He married his longtime partner, art director Douglas Hoffman, in July 2021.

== Filmography ==
=== Film ===
Year	Title	Role	Notes
2022	Mickey: The Story of a Mouse	Himself, Mickey Mouse	Voices Mickey in the film's Mickey in a Minute animated short

=== Television ===
Year	Title	Role	Notes
2009–2012	Have a Laugh!	Mickey Mouse	60 episodes
2012–2016	Mickey Mouse Clubhouse	Mickey Mouse	26 episodes
2012–present	Minnie's Bow-Toons	Mickey Mouse	
2017–2021	Mickey Mouse Mixed-Up Adventures	Mickey Mouse	87 episodes
2017–2018	Chip 'n Dale's Nutty Tales	Mickey Mouse	6 episodes
2018	Mickey's 90th Spectacular	Mickey Mouse	Television special
2020	Mickey Mornings	Mickey Mouse	
2020	CAVE iN	Himself	Episode: "Weldon's Troll Mob"
2021–2025	Mickey Mouse Funhouse	Mickey Mouse, Martian Mickey	Main cast; 86 episodes
2022	Mickey Saves Christmas	Mickey Mouse	Stop-motion television special
2025–present	Mickey Mouse Clubhouse+	Mickey Mouse, Martian Mickey	Main cast

=== Video games ===
Year	Title	Role	Notes
2010	Kingdom Hearts Birth by Sleep	Mickey Mouse	
2010	Epic Mickey	Mickey Mouse	
2011	Kingdom Hearts: Re:Coded	Mickey Mouse	
2011	Kinect Disneyland Adventures	Mickey Mouse	
2012	Kingdom Hearts 3D: Dream Drop Distance	Mickey Mouse	
2012	Epic Mickey 2: The Power of Two	Mickey Mouse	
2012	Epic Mickey: Power of Illusion	Mickey Mouse	
2013	Disney Infinity	Mickey Mouse	
2013	Where's My Mickey	Mickey Mouse	
2013	Castle of Illusion Starring Mickey Mouse	Mickey Mouse	
2013	Kingdom Hearts HD 1.5 Remix	Mickey Mouse	(358/2 Days HD cutscenes)
2014	Kingdom Hearts HD 2.5 Remix	Mickey Mouse	(Birth by Sleep game and Re:coded HD cutscenes)
2015	Disney Infinity 3.0	Mickey Mouse	
2016	Disney Magic Kingdoms	Mickey Mouse	Initial release; voice lines were removed in a later update
2017	Kingdom Hearts HD 2.8 Final Chapter Prologue	Mickey Mouse	
2017	Kingdom Hearts HD 1.5 + 2.5 ReMIX	Mickey Mouse	(358/2 Days HD cutscenes, Birth by Sleep game and Re:coded HD cutscenes)
2019	Kingdom Hearts III	Mickey Mouse	
2020	Kingdom Hearts III Re:Mind	Mickey Mouse	
2020	Kingdom Hearts: Melody of Memory	Mickey Mouse	
2022	Disney Dreamlight Valley	Mickey Mouse	
2023	Disney Illusion Island	Mickey Mouse	
2023	Disney Speedstorm	Mickey Mouse, Steamboat Mickey	

=== Web series ===
Year	Title	Role	Note
2024	Hot Ones	Mickey Mouse	Episode: "Donald Duck Tries to Keep His Cool While Eating Spicy Wings"

=== Theme park attractions ===
Year	Title	Role	Note
2013	Mickey and the Magical Map	Mickey Mouse	
2015	World of Color: Celebrate!	Mickey Mouse	Animated sequences
2017	Fantasmic!	Mickey Mouse	Disneyland version
2019	Disney's Not So Spooky Spectacular	Mickey Mouse	Animated sequences
2022	Disney Enchantment	Mickey Mouse	Animated segment
2022	Fantasmic!	Mickey Mouse	Disney's Hollywood Studios version

Preceded by Wayne Allwine	Voice of Mickey Mouse; 2009–present	Succeeded by Incumbent
