= List of Mickey Mouse Mixed-Up Adventures episodes =

Mickey Mouse Mixed-Up Adventures, formerly known as Mickey and the Roadster Racers, is an American animated preschool television series on Disney Junior. Produced by Disney Television Animation, it is the successor to Mickey Mouse Clubhouse. The series debuted on Disney Junior and Disney Channel in the United States on January 15, 2017, and ended on October 1, 2021.

The series was renewed for a second season on March 15, 2017, which premiered on April 13, 2018. A third season began airing on October 14, 2019, under the new title Mickey Mouse Mixed-Up Adventures.

== Series overview ==
Season	Segments	Episodes	Originally released	
Season	Segments	Episodes	First released	Last released
1	52	26	January 15, 2017	March 23, 2018
2	50	25	April 13, 2018	August 2, 2019
3	72	36	October 14, 2019	October 1, 2021

== Episodes ==
=== Season 1: Mickey and the Roadster Racers (2017-2018) ===
No. overall	No. in season	Title	Directed by	Written by	Storyboard by	Original release date	Prod. code	US viewers (millions)
1a	1a	"Mickey's Wild Tire!"	Phil Weinstein	Brian Swenlin	Dave Bennett	January 15, 2017	101a	2.03
In the first episode of the series, Mickey surprises Jiminy Johnson (Jimmie Johnson), a racing champion, with the tire from his first roadster. Displeased that his own gift for Jiminy won't impress him, Pete plans to be the one to give Jiminy the tire.
1b	1b	"Sittin' Kitty"	Broni Likomanov	Thomas Hart; Story editor : Thomas Hart	Dave Williams	January 15, 2017	101b	2.03
Minnie and Daisy are petsitting Hilda's pet Snowpuff. When they find a cat there, they think it's Snowpuff and pursue it when it escapes from the house.
2a	2a	"Goofy Gas!"	Broni Likomanov	Mark Seidenberg	Dave Williams	January 15, 2017	102a	1.98
Goofy invents the fuel that makes the roadsters go much faster. Though it has various side effects on the roadsters during a race when Chip and Dale run out of the usual fuel.
2b	2b	"Little Big Ape"	Broni Likomanov	Jennifer Muro; Story editor : Thomas Hart	Rossen Varbanov	January 15, 2017	102b	1.98
The Happy Helpers catch the loose gorilla in Clarabelle Cow's house. They soon discover that there are two gorillas consisting of a mother and a baby who are attracted to Clarabelle's banana breads.
3a	3a	"Race for the Rigatoni Ribbon!"	Phil Weinstein	Mark Seidenberg	Tom Morgan	January 16, 2017	103a	1.85
The Roadster Racers compete against known Italian racer Piston Pietro (an Italian alter ego of Pete) in Rome where Piston Pietro will do anything to ensure that he makes it across the finish line first. During this time, Goofy encounters the largest meatball in Rome.
3b	3b	"Roamin' Around Rome"	Phil Weinstein	Mark Drop; Story editors : Mark Seidenberg and Thomas Hart	Tom Morgan	January 16, 2017	103b	1.85
Assisting a tour guide named Luigi (Tony Shalhoub) when he falls sick, the Happy Helpers take the travel writer Robbie Roberts (Tim Gunn) on the tour of Rome alongside Mr. Bigby and the Beagleman family.
4a	4a	"Agent Double-O-Goof"	Broni Likomanov	Mark Drop	Kirk Hanson and Rossen Varbanov	January 16, 2017	105a	1.81
Goofy is mistaken for the secret agent Chauncey Chips (Peter Serafinowicz) by Lord Beaglethwait while the Queen of the United Kingdom comes for tea. He must keep a briefcase that is to be delivered to the Queen (Jane Leeves) from falling into the clutches of Commander Heist and his pet cat Lazlo.
4b	4b	"Egg-xasperating!"	Phil Weinstein	Kim Duran; Story editor : Thomas Hart	Dave Bennett	January 16, 2017	105b	1.81
The Happy Helpers and Pluto hold Clara Cluck's egg while she is out running her errands. When it starts to crack, Minnie and Cuckoo-Loca go to find Clara while Daisy and Pluto work to keep the egg from cracking even further.
5a	5a	"Mickey's Perfecto Day!"	Broni Likomanov	Ashley Mendoza; Story editor : Thomas Hart	Rossen Varbanov	January 20, 2017	104a	0.88
A playful baby bull named Francisco interrupts Mickey's perfect day for Minnie in Madrid. Meanwhile, Donald Duck reunites with The Three Caballeros, while Goofy competes in a dance contest against El Horace Horsecollar. Song: "Amigos Forever" sung by Daisy and The Three Caballeros
5b	5b	"Running of the Roadsters!"	Phil Weinstein	Mark Drop	Tom Morgan	January 20, 2017	104b	0.88
Minnie and Daisy bet with Mickey and Donald over the race involving the Happy Helpers' van when Daisy's Snapdragon gets wrecked and the losers will have to clean all the roadsters. They get into some antics along the way which includes ending up losing the hoop that El Toro Pete's bull jumps through. Meanwhile, El Horace Horsecollar plans to beat Goofy in the race.
6a	6a	"It's Wiki Wiki Time"	Broni Likomanov	Don Gillies	Dave Williams	January 27, 2017	106a	1.19
The Roadster Racers attend the big Wiki Wiki relay race when Donald is on his Hawaiian vacation. Though the Roadster Racers' racing against Team Pete (consisting of Pau Hana Pete, Pineapple Patty, Pu Pu Platter Pete and Puhi Pete) keeps disrupting Donald's relaxation.
6b	6b	"Happy Hula Helpers!"	Phil Weinstein	Kim Duran; Story editor : Thomas Hart	Dave Bennett	January 27, 2017	106b	1.19
The Happy Helpers teach the hula dance for the birthday celebrations and help Leilani find a birthday present for her Grandpa Kai who is getting picked up by her Auntie Olina. Meanwhile, Mickey and Goofy set up for the luau while Donald works to keep his sandwiches from being eaten by Leilani's pet pig Pekona.
7a	7a	"Ye Olde Royal Heist"	Phil Weinstein	Brian Swenlin	Phillip Mosness	February 3, 2017	107a	0.92
Mickey and Minnie celebrate their race-a-versary in London where an upcoming roadster race will be held. They soon get caught up in a heist where a dancing star named Sir Lord Pete plans to steal the Queen of England's Royal Ruby from the Tower of London and end up helping Officer Copper to catch him where they chase him all around London. Note: In the Disney+ reprint of this episode, the scene where Lord Pete bumps Donald's Roadster into the River Thames was cut for unknown reasons.
7b	7b	"Tea Time Trouble!"	Broni Likomanov	Jennifer Muro and Thomas Hart; Story editor : Thomas Hart	Kirk Hanson	February 3, 2017	107b	0.92
After helping to apprehend Sir Lord Pete and asking a favor from the Queen of England for a "race-a-versary" gift for Minnie, the Happy Helpers are invited to have tea with the Queen of England where Queen's Guard member Beefeater Pete deems Mickey, Donald and Goofy not worthy gentlemen to enter Buckingham Palace upon them not being able to pass the tea test. Due to Big Ben breaking down and the royal clock fixers being on holiday, Minnie, Daisy and Cuckoo-Loca work to get it tuned up so that it can strike 4:00 in time for tea time. Meanwhile, Mickey, Donald and Goofy take gentleman lessons from Dr. Waddleton Crutchley (Peter Serafinowicz). Song: "Fun in London Town" sung by Beau Black
8a	8a	"Abra-ka-Goof!"	Broni Likomanov	Don Gillies	Dave Williams and Dave Bennett	February 10, 2017	109a	0.99
Upon obtain a magical cabinet from Omar's Magic Mart, Goofy as the Amazing Goofini thinks he used his magician skills to turn Gordon Gear (Jeff Gordon) into the rabbit at the time when the Hot Dog Cafe is planning to name a hot dog after him. What he doesn't know is that the rabbit is Omar's pet rabbit Thurston as Mickey, Donald and Goofy pursue it where even Bitsy Beagleberg wants him as a pet. Meanwhile, Minnie, Daisy and Cuckoo-Loca give Gordon Gear a makeover.
8b	8b	"Happy Birthday Helpers!"	Phil Weinstein	Kim Duran; Story editor : Thomas Hart	Dave Bennett	February 10, 2017	109b	0.99
It's Susie Beagleman's birthday and the Happy Helpers must prepare a birthday cake for her birthday party that Mrs. Beagleman wants delivered by the time the Amazing Goofini is done with his magic tricks. They soon go on the wild ride when they chase down the wagon carrying the birthday cake. Meanwhile, Pete tries his hand at roller skating. Song: "Happy Helpers Birthday!" sung by The Happy Helpers
9a	9a	"Guru Goofy"	Phil Weinstein	Mark Drop	Tom Morgan	February 24, 2017	108a	1.24
Goofy tries to teach Donald mindfulness in order to relax before the Roadster Games, where he will compete against Pete.
9b	9b	"Bed, Breakfast and Bungled!"	Phil Weinstein	Kim Duran; Story editor : Thomas Hart	Phillip Mosness and Rossen Varbanov	February 24, 2017	108b	1.24
Clarabelle assists the Happy Helpers in running the Snoozy Doozy Bed and Breakfast outside of Hot Dog Hills while its manager Mr. Doozy takes his mother on a day cruise, but her eagerness creates and mess up the problems when giving services to the guests like the Thunderboom family and Mr. McSnorter.
10a	10a	"Going Upppppppppp!"	Broni Likomanov	Brian Swenlin	Rossen Varbanov	March 10, 2017	110a	1.21
The Roadster Racers compete in the first-ever Hot Dog Hills hot air balloon race, but they will also have to compete against Pete's foreign cousin and stunt pilot Sky Commander Peterlovsky.
10b	10b	"Gone Fishin'!"	Broni Likomanov	Story by : Kim Duran; Teleplay by : Mark Drop; Story editors : Thomas Hart and Mark Seidenberg	Dave Williams	March 10, 2017	110b	1.21
The Happy Helpers and Donald tag along with Mickey and Goofy for the fishing trip. Song: "Mickey and Goofy Time" sung by Mickey and Goofy
11a	11a	"Goof Luck Charm"	Phil Weinstein	Story by : Kim Duran; Story and teleplay by : Sherri Stoner; Story editor : Thomas Hart	Dave Bennett and Rossen Varbanov	March 24, 2017	113a	1.19
Goofy credits his good luck to his rubber duck, and Daisy decides to borrow it for a dangerous race course that she has never won.
11b	11b	"Teed Off!"	Broni Likomanov	Don Gillies	Rossen Varbanov	March 24, 2017	113b	1.19
The Happy Helpers work as caddies for the big golf tournament at a golf course that was opened by Mr. Bigby. While Minnie is the caddy for Pete, Daisy becomes the caddy for Donald while Mickey and Goofy are caddies for Hilda. Though there is some interference by a groundhog.
12a	12a	"The Impossible Race"	Phil Weinstein	Don Gillies	Tom Morgan	April 14, 2017	111a	1.51
Cuckoo-Loca participates in her first ever roadster event called the Impossible Race where her car is constructed by Chip and Dale. As she participates in the Impossible Race, she gains Donald as her main rival as the racers work to avoid the traps placed along the course. Song: "Building a Dream" sung by Cuckoo-Loca
12b	12b	"The Happiest Helpers Cruise!"	Broni Likomanov	Kim Duran; Story editor : Thomas Hart	Dave Williams	April 14, 2017	111b	1.51
The Happy Helpers are hired by Captain Peterson (an alter ego of Pete) to work as cruise directors on the Hot Dogs Hills Harbor Cruise during its Valentine's Day Cruise event. They help the first mate Emmy Lou (Kate Micucci) to win the disco dance contest upon being partnered up with Mr. Doozy after his previous partner Fiona Featherstone drops out due to a dancing accident. Song: "We'll Just Dance" sung by Alex Cartañá
13a	13a	"Smarty Goof"	Broni Likomanov	Story by : Mark Drop; Story and teleplay by : Sherri Stoner; Story editor : Thomas Hart	Kirk Hanson and Rossen Varbanov	May 12, 2017	115a	.99
Goofy and Mickey compete in the Hot Dog Hills Invention Competition with the help of Ludwig Von Drake where his helmet has made Goofy smart. With the helmet on him, Goofy starts deviating from his and Mickey's original invention.
13b	13b	"Adventures in Buddysitting!"	Phil Weinstein	Kim Duran; Story editor : Thomas Hart	Phillip Mosness	May 12, 2017	115b	.99
The Happy Helpers help the babysit kids like Clara Cluck's chicks Cleo and Clifford, Elray Thunderboom, Mrs. McSnorter's children Pearl and Puck, and a shy goat named Buddy McBilly when the Hot Dog Hills Play Center is closed. When a squirrel gets into the chicken suit that Buddy was in, Daisy chases it around town thinking that it's Buddy in that costume.
14a	14a	"Daredevil Goofy!"	Phil Weinstein	Story by : Don Gillies; Story and teleplay by : Brian Swenlin	Tom Morgan	June 16, 2017	114a	1.43
Goofy gets a chance to compete against the movie hero Morty McCool (an alter-ego of Mortimer Mouse) in a daredevil race alongside Pete, Hilda and El Horace Horsecollar.
14b	14b	"The Big Broadcast"	Broni Likomanov	Mark Drop; Story editor : Thomas Hart	Roger Dondis	June 16, 2017	114b	1.43
The Happy Helpers cover for Billy Beagle as race announcers while he competes against the Roadster Racers in the off-road race.
15a	15a	"Stop That Heist!"	Phil Weinstein	Mark Drop	Dave Bennett	July 14, 2017	116a	1.09
As Mickey drives Billy Beagle's Golden Rumble Seat Roadster for the Hot Dog Hills Founder's Day parade, it becomes the latest target of Commander Heist's roadster heist. Mickey and his friends must work to keep Commander Heist from making off with the Golden Rumble Seat Roadster.
15b	15b	"Lights, Camera, Help!"	Broni Likomanov	Story by : Don Gillies; Teleplay by : Sherri Stoner; Story editors : Mark Seidenberg and Thomas Hart	Rossen Varbanov	July 14, 2017	116b	1.09
The Happy Helpers are hired by film director Peteroni Leone (an Italian alter ego of Pete) to become assistants to a famous movie star named Portia DeHound during the production of a musical movie called "My Fair Doggy" that Peteroni is filming in Hot Dog Hills. Minnie and Daisy soon discover that Portia DeHound hasn't taken any singing lessons and is only good at singing in the shower. Song: "Frankly" sung by Portia
16a	16a	"Mouse vs. Machine!"	Phil Weinstein	Story by : Brian Swenlin; Teleplay by : Mark Seidenberg	Tom Morgan	July 28, 2017	117a	1.13
Mickey competes against an A.I. roadster named the Self-Racing Racer (or S.R.R. for short) who was created by Ludwig Von Drake. When it malfunctions during its race with him upon being pelted by water balloons, Mickey must help Ludwig get it back under control.
16b	16b	"Grandpa Beagle's Day Out"	Broni Likomanov	Teleplay by : Kim Duran; Story and teleplay by : Mark Drop; Story editor : Thomas Hart	Dave Williams	July 28, 2017	117b	1.13
The Happy Helpers help Grandpa Beagle and Billy Beagle have family time at the X-Treme Games when Billy hires them to watch over his grandfather while he hosts the X-Treme Games.
17a	17a	"Donald's Garage"	Broni Likomanov	Don Gillies	Roger Dondis	August 11, 2017	118a	1.14
While Mickey goes to secure a bull hood ornament as part of a refurbishing of a limousine owned by Mr. Bigby, Donald is left in charge of the garage up until Mickey returns.
17b	17b	"Artful Helpers"	Broni Likomanov	Teleplay by : Thomas Hart; Story and teleplay by : Brian Swenlin; Story editor : Thomas Hart	Roger Dondis	August 11, 2017	118b	1.14
The Fancy Art Museum's curator Babette Beagle (Jane Leeves) hires the Happy Helpers to cover for the museum's security staff who are on their day off. They work to keep the Mona Goof painting that was donated to the Fancy Art Museum by Goofy from being stolen by Commander Heist.
18a	18a	"Ready, Get Pet... Go Pluto!"	Phil Weinstein	Mark Drop	Tom Morgan	August 25, 2017	120a	0.86
The first ever Pets and Pistons Race is started upon the suggestion of Danni Sue (Danica Patrick) and her pet dog Dallas as she has many friends with pets where the racers and their pets must complete three different challenges that Daisy and Cuckoo-Loca help set up. Mickey races with Pluto, Pete races with Butch, Donald races with Francisco, Minnie races with Figaro and Goofy races with his pet goldfish Goldie. During this time, Pluto competes with Butch for the attention of Dallas.
18b	18b	"Figaro's New Friend!"	Broni Likomanov	Teleplay by : Mark Drop; Story and teleplay by : Kim Duran; Story editor : Thomas Hart	Rossen Varbanov	August 25, 2017	120b	0.86
Mickey has to put a custom engine into Mr. Bigby's roadster and wants Minnie, Daisy and Cuckoo-Loca to watch over Pluto while he is too busy. Figaro must put up with Pluto as he competes with him for Minnie and Daisy's attention at home and at the dog park.
19a	19a	"Garage Alone"	Phil Weinstein	Mark Drop	Roger Dondis and Phillip Mosness	September 15, 2017	121a	0.73
While everyone is attending the drive-in movie, Goofy and Pluto stay behind to watch the TV series Action Ashton where the titular character makes traps to get out of a situation. Officer Schnauzer of the Hot Dog Hills Police Department announces on TV that a thief named Sticky Fingers Fred is on the loose, causing Goofy to set traps around the garage just in case Sticky Fingers Fred shows up.
19b	19b	"Camp Happy Helpers"	Broni Likomanov	Kim Duran; Story editor : Thomas Hart	Roger Dondis	September 15, 2017	121b	0.73
Minnie, Daisy and Cuckoo-Loca get a call from Mrs. Beagleman stating that a camp counselor has informed her that all the camp counselors came down with the summer hiccup at the time when her daughter Susie was supposed to go to camp. As the Happy Helpers become camp counselors for Susie and Minnie's nieces Millie and Melody, Daisy is suspicious when Susie plans to investigate the legend of the Bigfoot Beast as its stalking is much similar to the Squidrilla horror movie that she just saw.
20a	20a	"The Haunted Hot Rod"	Phil Weinstein	Mark Drop	Phillip Mosness	October 6, 2017	112a	0.96
On Halloween, Mickey decorates his roadster for Hot Dog Hills' first ever Race Around Ragged Peak where Mickey tells his friends about the Haunted Hot Rod that looks for a race to compete in. Pete and Butch plan to pose as the Haunted Hot Rod's ghost driver in order to win the Jack-o'-lantern filled with candy. Unfortunately for Pete, the real driver shows up when Mickey is the only competitor left. Song: "Go-Go-Ghost" sung by Beau Black
20b	20b	"Pete's Ghostly Gala"	Broni Likomanov	Don Gillies; Story editor : Thomas Hart	Rossen Varbanov	October 6, 2017	112b	0.96
The Happy Helpers help Pete get things ready for his Halloween Party at the haunted house on Spookyview Lane. As Minnie, Daisy and Cuckoo-Loca work to help Pete set up the Halloween Party, they are stalked by three ghosts named Slip, Mugsy and Earl that reside at the haunted house. This leads to Minnie, Daisy, Cuckoo-Loca and Pete working to catch the ghosts right before the Halloween Party. Song: "Creepy Creeps" sung by Slip, Mugsy and Earl
21a	21a	"Billy Beagle's Tip-Top Garage"	Phil Weinstein	Mark Drop	Tom Morgan and Kyle Menke	November 5, 2017	122a	1.35
Billy Beagle arrives at Mickey's Garage as part of his show "Billy Beagle's Tip-Top Garage" where he spends the day filming Mickey and his friends working there and turn a junky vehicle into a winning roadster in order to win the Tip-Top Plaque. Meanwhile, Pete wants to get involved with the restoration of the vehicle with comical results. Song: "Mickey's Garage" sung by Mickey
21b	21b	"Diner Dog Rescue"	Broni Likomanov	Story by : Don Gillies; Teleplay by : Mark Drop and Jennifer Muro; Story editors : Mark Seidenberg and Thomas Hart	Dave Williams	November 5, 2017	122b	1.35
The Happy Helpers assist famous TV chef Gerald Oxley (Gordon Ramsay) when it comes to working on his show "Menu Makeover" to save the Hot Dog Diner when Chef Beagle's waitress Mimi left to study cooking in France leaving him to run the diner on his own. The Happy Helpers and Chef Oxley work to clean up the Hot Dog Diner and the food to the points which Chef Oxley wants it to be to the point where it can be like he remembered it. Song: "Let's Get Cooking!" sung by Beau Black
22a	22a	"Pit Stop and Go"	Phil Weinstein	Story by : Don Gillies; Story and teleplay by : Craig Carlisle	Roger Dondis and Dave Bennett	November 17, 2017	123a	0.68
At the first "Pit Stop and Go" rally that is attended by Gordon Gear and Danni Sue, pit crews compete against each other to see who is the fastest and most efficient pit crew while avoiding obstacles in the race. Mickey has Donald, Chip and Dale as his pit crew, Minnie, Daisy and Cuckoo-Loca are paired up with Danni Sue, and Goofy and Pluto are paired up with Gordon Gear.
22b	22b	"Alarm on the Farm"	Broni Likomanov	Sherri Stoner; Story editor : Thomas Hart	Rossen Varbanov	November 17, 2017	123b	0.68
When Clara Cluck and her chicks Cleo and Clifford go out of town for two days, the Happy Helpers agree to watch over her farm as farmworkers. During this time, the Happy Helpers have to milk the cow, feed the pigs, collect the eggs from the chickens and have them ready for Clara Cluck's stand at the farmers' market by the time she returns. Song: "Don't Give Up" sung by The Happy Helpers
23a	23a	"Happy Hot Diggity Dog Holiday!"	Phil Weinstein	Mark Seidenberg	Dave Bennett and Rossen Varbanov	December 1, 2017	126a	0.84
During Christmas, Hot Dog Hills is hosting its annual Ornament Palooza where Billy Beagle has left clues to where he has hidden the ornaments all over Hot Dog Hills. Chip and Dale decide to take part in the racing in separate cars in order to win the Golden Star Tree Topper for each other by pairing up with Goofy and Donald while Mickey is paired with Minnie and Daisy is paired with Pete. Song: "Hot Dog Holiday Roadster" sung by Beau Black
23b	23b	"Happy Holiday Helpers!"	Broni Likomanov	Kim Duran; Story editor : Thomas Hart	Rossen Varbanov	December 1, 2017	126b	0.84
Minnie, Daisy and Cuckoo-Loca set up for their office Christmas party while dealing with other side jobs like digging out Grandpa Beagle's front door while Billy Beagle is out of town, helping Clarabelle unblock her chimney, helping to untangle Mickey, Donald, Chip and Dale from the Christmas lights, and helping Santa Goofy getting Christmas wishes to the kids at Zoomingdale's. Song: "The Best Christmas Ever" sung by Minnie and the gang
24a	24a	"Hot Dog Daze Afternoon"	Phil Weinstein	Craig Carlisle	Phillip Mosness	January 15, 2018	124a	1.09
Mickey Mouse takes a day off from his garage and brings Pluto with him. However, certain incidents like a flooding garage and Mr. Bigby's electric car being overcharged cause him to be called back to the garage for him to handle.
24b	24b	"Super Sweet Helpers"	Broni Likomanov	Kim Duran; Story editor : Thomas Hart	Roger Dondis	January 15, 2018	124b	1.09
Mrs. Sweetums (Hoda Kotb) hires the Happy Helpers to look after her candy store Sweetums' Sweets while she goes to a candy convention in Bunberg. While working there, they must make more candy in order to help Mayor McBeagle fill a big hot dog piñata with candy for his surprise summertime party in one hour.
25a	25a	"The Grand Food Truck Rally"	Phil Weinstein	Kim Duran	Dave Bennett	February 19, 2018	119a	1.02
In Paris, France, the Grand Food Truck Rally is occurring where road speed and kitchen skills are needed to win. While Minnie is paired up with Daisy and Cuckoo-Loca, Donald is paired up with Chip and Dale, Goofy is paired up with Clarabelle Cow and Mickey is paired up with the famous chef Pierre la Pierre. The event involves the competitors having to obtain cheese from a cheese shop and make it into a dish to please the famous critic Robbie Roberts in order to advance. Song: "Bonjour, Paris" sung by Alex Cartañá
25b	25b	"Cuckoo La-La"	Broni Likomanov	Kim Duran; Story editor : Thomas Hart	Dave Williams	February 19, 2018	119b	1.02
Minnie and Daisy are thrilled when fashion designer Cuckoo La-La asks them to help her with her fashion show when all of her models are on holiday. Minnie and Daisy are surprised to discover that Cuckoo La-La is also the cousin of Cuckoo-Loca. After testing Minnie and Daisy on the "birdwalk", Cuckoo La-La handles a customer and prepares for her interview with Robbie Roberts while Minnie, Daisy and Cuckoo-Loca get the new outfits ready for the fashion show with varying results.
26a	26a	"Rockin' Roadsters!"	Phil Weinstein	Mark Drop	Tom Morgan	March 23, 2018	125a	0.85
The gang is invited to compete in Billy Beagle's Hot Rod Switcheroo. It starts with a race to the parking lot where the last roadster that arrives has their car removed. Then they must walk around the switcheroo circle, riding in each other's roadster and do the same thing in 4 rounds up until only two are left for the finish line and win that hot rod switcheroo trophy.
26b	26b	"Safari, So Goody"	Broni Likomanov	Mark Drop and Thomas Hart; Story editor : Thomas Hart	Dave Williams	March 23, 2018	125b	0.85
The Happy Helpers are hired by Ivy Beaglesnoot to become safari tour guides at the Hot Dog Hills Wild Animal Safari Park when the park's tour guide is away for the day. They take the McBilly family and the McSnorter family on a photo safari where Buddy McBilly's friend Lou-Lou wants to photograph the residential giant panda named Penny. At the same time, Pete works as the intern where his interaction with the animals causes comical results for the tour group. Song: "Tutti-Frutti-Tango" sung by Daisy

=== Season 2: Super-Charged (2018-2019) ===
No. overall	No. in season	Title	Directed by	Written by	Storyboards by	Original release date	Prod. code	US viewers (millions)
27a	1a	"The Biggest Heist Ever"	Phil Weinstein	Mark Drop	Tom Morgan	April 13, 2018	201a	0.87
After Von Drake invents the Rolling Roadster Rumbler to carry all the roadsters, Goofy drives it his way with Donald getting it in the next 10 minutes. However, Commander Heist steals it and they must find a way to get it back right before he gets away with it.
27b	1b	"Thrillin' Hilda"	Broni Likomanov	Kim Duran; Story editor : Thomas Hart	Dave Williams	April 13, 2018	201b	0.87
When her skydiving lessons exhaust Tony enough to close down Tony's Skydiving School for a month, Hilda asks the Happy Helpers to help her find a new sport to play. She tries various things up until it comes to an obstacle course event hosted by Billy Beagle, though Hilda's opponent in this event is Pete's cousin Pineapple Patty.
28a	2a	"Stop Lazlo!"	Phil Weinstein	Thomas Hart	Phillip Mosness	May 4, 2018	215a	0.66
Von Drake has a cold and lends Mickey the Smarty Hat to help fix the Roadsters. When Commander Heist tries to steal Von Drake's Smarty Hat as part of a plot to make all of the hot dogs in Hot Dog Hills disappear with his Sonic Hot Dog Eliminator and target the secret recipe for them, Heist's cat Lazlo gets in the way and gets the Smarty Hat on him while planning to do the criminal action himself. Now Commander Heist must work with Mickey, Donald and Goofy to get the Smarty Hat off of Lazlo. Absent: Minnie Mouse and Daisy Duck
28b	2b	"The Hot Diggity Dog Show"	Broni Likomanov	Sherri Stoner; Story editor : Thomas Hart	Roger Dondis	May 4, 2018	215b	0.66
The Happy Helpers get called by Mr. Bigby to be pet groomers for The Hot Diggity Dog Show hosted by Robbie Roberts when the appointed groomer Caesar Du Flan gets infested with fleas. The dogs they must groom are Pluto, Butch, Mr. Doozy's dog Wanda and a dog named Champ (who Mr. Bigby is watching for Ivy Beaglesnoot, who broke her toe and can't be there), though things go wrong when Jinx gets into Corn Dog Stadium.
29a	3a	"Donald's Stinky Day"	Phil Weinstein	Mike Kubat	Tom Morgan	June 8, 2018	204a	0.49
Mayor McBeagle is doing a beautification event for the park, where Daisy wants to help plant the flowers. After Donald accidentally rescues a skunk that was chased up a tree by Butch, the little stinker refuses to leave Donald's side as it affects his activities with his friends, though the skunk comes in handy when Donald gets a swarm of bees furious.
29b	3b	"The Hiking Honeybees"	Broni Likomanov	Story by : Kim Duran and Thomas Hart; Teleplay by : Mark Drop; Story editor : Thomas Hart	Dave Williams	June 8, 2018	204b	0.49
The Happy Helpers are contacted by Hilda to guide BeeBee Scouts Susie Beagleman, Buddy McBilly and Elray Thunderboom through their forest hiking test when her assistant trail guide comes into contact with poison ivy. As Minnie was a former BeeBee Scout, Daisy plans to get her wings by following certain instructions, with comical results.
30a	4a	"Racing Rivals"	Phil Weinstein	Story and teleplay by : Mark Drop and Kim Duran	Dave Bennett	June 22, 2018	203a	0.57
Minnie comes up with a special daily driver grand prix race involving the racers' Daily Drivers that can include her visiting childhood friend Maggie (Jennifer Cody). If the Daily Driver is turned into a Roadster, the racer is out of the race. Though Daisy gets worried that Minnie and Maggie will compete with each other, trouble happens when they block Donald's way and he ends up in a lake, Mickey gets stuck on top of the geyser and Daisy nearly misses the landing platform. As a result, they force themselves to use the roadsters to get out of a situation.
30b	4b	"The Hapless Helpers"	Broni Likomanov	Story by : Thomas Hart; Teleplay by : Kim Duran; Story editor : Thomas Hart	Rossen Varbanov	June 22, 2018	203b	0.57
While the girls enjoy a spa day, the boys fill in as Happy Helpers. They divide the jobs among themselves like Donald helping Pete deal with a giant spider in his house, Goofy babysitting Clara Cluck's chicks and Mickey helping Bean Danowitz at the hair salon deal with his customers Clarabelle Cow, Dr. Fozz and Mrs. Beagleman after he hurt his arm putting some extra curls in a client's hair. When things get out of hand, they must remember Minnie's advice: "When you all work as a team, Happy Helpers can do anything!".
31a	5a	"The Goofy Race!"	Phil Weinstein	Mark Drop	Dave Bennett	June 29, 2018	205a	0.52
Goofy designs the first-ever Goofy Race in order to follow in the footsteps of known race challenge designer Silly Steve. Each racer must complete every Goofy task or they are out of the race.
31b	5b	"Cuckoo for Cuckoo Clocks!"	Broni Likomanov	Kim Duran; Story editor : Thomas Hart	Rossen Varbanov	June 29, 2018	205b	0.52
When Cuckoo-Loca's cuckoo clock is broken, Minnie and Daisy decide to get her a new one while she goes to get some tools to fix it. When it isn't up to Cuckoo-Loca's accommodations, Minnie and Daisy work to reclaim it as it is taken around Hot Dog Hills.
32a	6a	"The Roadsterettes!"	Phil Weinstein	Robert Ramirez	Rossen Varbanov and Phillip Mosness	July 20, 2018	209a	0.51
Famous race car driver Pippa Powers (Pippa Mann) visits Hot Dog Hills for a reunion with her old car club "The Roadsterettes" which Minnie, Daisy and Cuckoo-Loca have been a part of. The Beagle Busters consisting of Randy Riff Raff (Adrian Zmed), Pete and Mutsy crash the reunion and challenge the Roadsterettes to a race for the prize of the Golden Gasket. Unfortunately, Pippa hasn't won a race all year and Mutsy and Pete plan to cheat behind Randy's back. Song: "Shifting Gears" sung by The Happy Helpers
32b	6b	"Oh Happy Day"	Broni Likomanov	Story by : Kim Duran; Teleplay by : Sherri Stoner and Thomas Hart; Story editor : Thomas Hart	Roger Dondis	July 20, 2018	209b	0.51
The Happy Helpers head to the beach where Mrs. McSnorter wants them to show her husband Mr. McSnorter how to relax on vacation when he is working to arrange the condiments to be delivered to Corn Dog Stadium instead. They show him various ways of relaxing through a picnic, relaxing by the pool and yoga with Guru Goofy which go comically away.
33a	7a	"Phantom of the Café"	Phil Weinstein	Mike Kubat	Tom Morgan	August 3, 2018	206a	0.60
In Paris, Mickey and his friends attend the opening of Chef Pierre's new cafe called Le Hot Dog that will include a new spice for Goofy's Goofy Dogs. When the suitcase containing the Goofy Dogs go missing, Minnie, Daisy and Donald work to help Chef Pierre make back-up dishes while Goofy, Mickey and Pluto work to rescue the Goofy Dogs from Celeste, the star pupil and her pet poodle Patrice.
33b	7b	"Cuckoo in Paris"	Broni Likomanov	Kim Duran; Story editor : Thomas Hart	Dave Williams	August 3, 2018	206b	0.60
The Happy Helpers visit Cuckoo La-La when she unveils her latest fashion collection presented by the rest of Cuckoo-Loca's cousins Cuckoo Monet the painter, Cuckoo Angela the sculptor, Cuckoo E. Claire the baker and Cuckoo Carmen the opera singer. While Cuckoo-Loca gets to know her cousins the next day, Minnie and Daisy go on a trip to Notre-Dame de Paris where they meet Hunchback Pete and get an emergency call from Clarabelle to help with the banana bread orders. Song: "A Million Wonderful Things" sung by Alex Cartañá
34a	8a	"Super-Charged!"	Phil Weinstein	Mark Seidenberg	Phillip Mosness	August 17, 2018	212a	0.54
To help Mickey win a race against his rival cousin Dr. Victor Von Goose (Tony Hale) and his roadster called the Von Goose Velocitor 5000 which will be driven by Max Maximum, Von Drake super-charges Mickey's roadster where he gives it super-speed and a few surprises.
34b	8b	"Super-Charged: Mickey's Monster Rally"	Broni Likomanov	Mark Seidenberg	Roger Dondis	August 17, 2018	212b	0.54
Mickey and the gang must chase after Pete's Super Crusher which was accidentally transformed into a Monster Truck by Von Drake's Strengthenator during an attempt to strengthen Butch's hot dog chew toy. They must also rescue Butch who is trapped in its driver seat.
35a	9a	"Super-Charged: Pop Star Helpers"	Phil Weinstein	Mark Drop	Tom Morgan	August 24, 2018	213a	0.46
Pop star Nina Glitter (Sabrina Carpenter) is going to be performing at Hot Dog Hills Stadium. The Happy Helpers are hired by Nina's tour manager Jess to get Nina Glitter to her show on time and set up the equipment while Jess deals with a music emergency in Veggieburg where Nina will perform there tomorrow. While Minnie goes to help the hired roadies Mickey, Donald and Goofy, Daisy and Cuckoo-Loca go to pick up Nina and the Glitterettes. Song: "Bow Be Mine" sung by Minnie and Nina Glitter
35b	9b	"The Chip 'N Dale 500"	Broni Likomanov	Mark Drop	Dave Williams	August 24, 2018	213b	0.46
When Donald doubts that they have won the own mini-roadster races they were involved with as those involved with those races are the same size as them, Chip and Dale shrink everyone down to their size with Von Drake's shrinking ray and race throughout the mini-golf course as part of the Chip 'N Dale 500 dealing with various obstacles along the way. Donald goes through the obstacles with comical results and gets chased by Jinx.
36a	10a	"Mickey's Ukulele Jam"	Phil Weinstein	Mike Kubat	Dave Bennett	September 28, 2018	207a	0.58
In Hawaii, Auntie Olina's Annual Ukulele Jam is occurring. Donald accidentally loses Mickey's special ukulele that he placed on the back of a sea turtle while he gets a new string for Donald's ukulele. Now they must find the ukulele right before the Ukulele Jam begins at sunset where they even receive help in rescuing it from a volcano from Team Pete.
36b	10b	"Grandpa vs. Grandpa"	Broni Likomanov	Teleplay by : Mark Drop; Story and teleplay by : Kim Duran; Story editor : Thomas Hart	Rossen Varbanov	September 28, 2018	207b	0.58
The Happy Helpers are hired by Auntie Olina to be judges for a Hawaiian surfing contest at the Banzai Pipeline hosted by Billy Beagle. As Mickey, Donald, Goofy and Pineapple Patty partake in the contest, the Happy Helpers learn about a lifelong rivalry between Grandpa Kai and Grandpa Beagle even after a waterspout strands the two grandfathers and the Happy Helpers on an island.
37a	11a	"Goof Mansion"	Phil Weinstein	Mike Kubat	Larry Leker	October 5, 2018	211a	0.52
At Mickey's Garage during Halloween, Goofy is approached by his Uncle Goof's business partner Mr. Talbot (Guillermo del Toro) who states that Uncle Goof hasn't been heard from in 13 years since he went to Peru to search for the Golden Pendant of Paka-Pula. As part of the condition if Uncle Goof went missing, Goofy and the gang have to spend a night in Uncle Goof's haunted mansion in order for Goofy to inherit it. Though Mr. Talbot plans to make Goofy fail so that the inheritance would go to him.
37b	11b	"A Doozy Night of Mystery"	Broni Likomanov	Story by : Thomas Hart; Teleplay by : Elizabeth Stonecipher; Story editor : Thomas Hart	Rossen Varbanov	October 5, 2018	211b	0.52
When Mr. Doozy invites the Happy Helpers, Mickey, Donald, Goofy, Pete and Clarabelle to the Snoozy Doozy Bed and Breakfast for his annual dinner party, a family heirloom called the Doozy Black Raven that has been in the Doozy family for generations goes missing during a blackout. This turns the dinner party into a whodunit situation. They soon discover that the culprit is someone they'd least suspect known as Jinx the cat.
38a	12a	"Daisy's Photo Finish!"	Broni Likomanov	Robert Ramirez; Story editor : Thomas Hart	Roger Dondis and Rossen Varbanov	October 19, 2018	208a	0.62
Minnie and Daisy travel to Brazil's Amazon rainforest to help Daisy's cousin Almanda de Quack (Camilla Belle) get a picture of a rare bird called the kinglet calyptura as part of an urgent photo assignment for Brazil's biggest bird convention called the Conferência de Pássaros. Though the kinglet calyptura can only be found at the Pico da Neblina. Absent: Goofy
38b	12b	"Super-Charged: Daisy's Grande Goal"	Phil Weinstein	Story by : Mark Drop; Story and teleplay by : Robert Ramirez	Phillip Mosness	October 19, 2018	208b	0.62
While playing soccer, Daisy mentions that Almanda wins every match they played. The next day, a Roadster soccer match held between Team Mickey and the Brazilian Borboletas consisting of Almanda, Panchito, José and Pancho Pete. During the game, Daisy's competitiveness gets out of hand. Absent: Goofy
39a	13a	"Pluto and the Pup"	Phil Weinstein	Mike Kubat	Dave Bennett	November 2, 2018	210a	0.49
Pluto becomes extremely upset with a stowaway pup named Phoebe that Mickey unknowingly brings to the garage. As Mickey works to find out who Phoebe's owner is, the others work on a roadster that Pete plans to deliver to a boat that is bound for China. When it is discovered that Phoebe is in the roadster, it's up to Pluto to get her off the boat.
39b	13b	"Trouble at Floochi's!"	Broni Likomanov	Kim Duran; Story editor : Thomas Hart	Rossen Varbanov	November 2, 2018	210b	0.49
A new Floochi's shoe store is opening on Main Street. The Happy Helpers help Mr. Floochi (Luciano Palermi) run the store up until he is done holding job interviews for new employees. When a pair of diamond shoes called the Diamond Dreamwalkers that were made for Fiona Featherstone are swapped at the shoe store for another pair that is to be purchased by Mr. McSnorter, they must work to recover them right before Fiona arrives.
40a	14a	"Goofy's Drive-In"	Phil Weinstein	Mark Drop; Story editor : Thomas Hart	Phillip Mosness	November 9, 2018	214a	0.60
Goofy learns from Mr. Bandicoot (Jeff Bennett) that nobody has come out to his drive-in movie theater in awhile, causing him to make plans to close down. At the persuasion of Millie and Melody, Team Mickey decides to save Goofy's favorite drive-in movie theater by cleaning it up, reactivating the snack bar and putting up promotional posters, despite interference from the groundhog named Sparky.
40b	14b	"The Iron Mouse"	Broni Likomanov	Mike Kubat	Roger Dondis and Rossen Varbanov	November 9, 2018	214b	0.60
The Happy Helpers are hired by Mr. Bigby to help search for the culprit that is sabotaging the 14th Annual Iron Mouse competition hosted by Billy Beagle where competitors will show of their strength and skills. Disguising themselves as Marmaduke Mouse and Daniel Duck as a way to go undercover like Detective Madame Mallard in her films, Minnie and Daisy compete against Mickey, Donald, Goofy, Pete's nephew Jimbo (Fred Stoller) and Max Maximum.
41a	15a	"Mickey's Big Surprise"	Phil Weinstein	Mark Drop	Dave Bennett	November 16, 2018	202a	0.48
Mickey's birthday is coming up as Minnie has found the perfect present in the form of his first roadster called the Hot Dog Racer which was buried in Pete's junkyard. As he is known for spoiling secrets, Goofy struggles to keep Minnie’s surprise for Mickey’s birthday a secret as everybody works to keep him from ruining the surprise.
41b	15b	"Meet the Beagles!"	Broni Likomanov	Kim Duran; Story editor : Thomas Hart	Rossen Varbanov	November 16, 2018	202b	0.48
On the night when the Beagles are going to perform, a news report states that they are breaking up following a fight with each other. The Happy Helpers are hired by the Beagles' manager Colonel Pete to help get the band back together. They go around to get back together the incognito members Nick Beagle (Max Longmuir), Luke Beagle (Shane Keogh-Grenade) and Rocko Beagle (Jayden Fowora-Knight) where it was mentioned that their Golden Guitar Award has gone missing. Now they must find the Golden Guitar Award in time to restart the concert. Song: "Get Up, Get Up and Go!" sung by The Beagles
42a	16a	"Snow-Go with the Flow"	Phil Weinstein	Mike Kubat	Larry Leker and Tom Morgan	November 30, 2018	216a	0.55
In Switzerland, Team Mickey is at the Swiss Alps for their annual Snow-A-Bunga holiday trip when Leilani, Auntie Olina, and Grandpa Kai appear and have their first experience with snow. The lodge's activities director Heidi has them competing in events that aren't on Minnie's schedule.
42b	16b	"Happy Helpers on Ice!"	Broni Likomanov	Kim Duran; Story editor : Thomas Hart	Dave Williams	November 30, 2018	216b	0.55
When her old ice skating coach named Coach Hannah is coming to Hot Dogs Hills for a visit, Hilda asks the Happy Helpers for help putting on a Goldilocks and the Three Bears ice show in order to impress Coach Hannah. The Happy Helpers enlist Mickey, Donald, Goofy, Chip and Dale to help out with the show. Though Hilda will have to master the Three-Bear Triple-Spin which she failed at during an earlier performance. Though during the performance, a bear attracted to the hot dogs crashes the performance.
43a	17a	"Ski Trippin'!"	Phil Weinstein	Mike Kubat	Phillip Mosness	January 18, 2019	218a	0.58
On a winter ski trip with her friends to the local ski resort, Daisy remembers that she doesn't know how to ski. So her friends help her lean how to ski with their special ski masterclass. One of these results gets Daisy unknowingly competing in the Frozen Moose Freestyle Classic that has Pete, Clarabelle Cow, Hilda and Highway Horace competing.
43b	17b	"My Fair Pete"	Broni Likomanov	Teleplay by : Kim Duran; Story and teleplay by : Sherri Stoner; Story editor : Thomas Hart	Roger Dondis	January 18, 2019	218b	0.58
Mayor McBeagle enlists the Happy Helpers to fill in for him while he is away at Kielbasa Falls for the day. En route to their job, they encounter Pete who is worried that he won't be able to impress Mama Pete when she comes for a visit as she thinks he has a big important job. This causes the Happy Helpers to bring Pete along where he must do mayoral duties like cutting the ribbon at the new Flooch's Shoe Store which is managed by Fiona Featherstone, a press conference and naming a new street as the Happy Helpers assist him at each one. Song: "Mayor for a Day" sung by The Happy Helpers
44a	18a	"Super-Charged: The Big Cheesy"	Phil Weinstein	Mike Kubat	Tom Morgan	February 15, 2019	217a	0.58
In Gloucestershire, England, William "Willie" Bartholomew Beagle (Steve Valentine) hosts the Cooper's Hill Cheese Rolling Chase which is the United Kingdom's most tastiest game. With the Queen of England in attendance, whoever catches their cheese wheel will win the event. Meanwhile, Goofy helps Clarabelle at her food truck as he watches over dog collar that she plans to give to the Queen of England for her dogs. During the Cooper's Hill Cheese Rolling Chase, a 9 lb. Double Gloucester cheese wheel spins out of control when Goofy accidentally placed the dog collar on it as everybody works to catch the cheese wheel.
44b	18b	"Shenannygans!"	Broni Likomanov	Robert Ramirez; Story editor : Thomas Hart	Dave Williams	February 15, 2019	217b	0.58
In London, the Happy Helpers are hired by Dr. Waddleton Crutchley (now voiced by Stephen Fry) to be nannies for his children Pip and Poppy. They take them on new experiences in order to help make them well-rounded citizens. This consists of riding the Thames River Cable Car and visiting Kensington Gardens to play croquet. When it comes to kite-flying by the time Dr. Crutchley appears for tea time, a storm shows up and starts blowing everyone around with their kites. Song: "Step Outside Your Door" sung by The Happy Helpers
45a	19a	"You Quack Me Up"	Phil Weinstein	Story by : Kim Duran; Teleplay by : Mark Drop; Story editor : Thomas Hart	Tom Morgan	March 29, 2019	219a	0.50
It's April Fool's Day at Hot Dog Hills as Billy Beagle hosts a contest in Hot Dog Hills where the person who outdoes the other will win the April Fool's Day crown from Mayor McBeagle. Donald decides to win the pranking contest by outdoing everyone else. This goes up until Donald ties with Pete as they compete to see who will win the contest.
45b	19b	"Tree House Trouble"	Broni Likomanov	Kim Duran; Story editor : Thomas Hart	Dave Williams	March 29, 2019	219b	0.50
When Chip and Dale have a roommate squabble, they ask the Happy Helpers to find them each a new home. While Chip bunks with Donald and Dale bunks with Goofy. After that ends in a disaster, the Happy Helpers look for some tree houses for Chip and Dale while hoping that they will move back in together.
46a	20a	"Mickey's Spring Grand Prix"	Phil Weinstein	Mike Kubat	Dave Bennett and Roger Dondis	April 5, 2019	220a	0.49
Mickey enlists his friends, and his celebrity hot-rod racing friends to join his crew for Mickey's Ultimate Spring Grand Prix throughout Hot Dog Hills. Each driver must visit one Hot Dog Hills landmark like Mickey's Garage, the lighthouse, the Happy Helpers Office, the Hot Dog Diner and Mustard Hills in order to collect the special tokens for the spring grand prix championship trophy. Mickey is paired up with Mario Mousedrette (Mario Andretti), Minnie is paired up with Danni Sue, Goofy is paired up with Gordon Gear, Donald is paired up with Sato and Daisy is paired up with Bia (Bia Figueiredo). Displeased that the junkyard was left out, Pete and Butch plan to do something about it.
46b	20b	"My Little Daisy"	Broni Likomanov	Jorjeana Marie; Story editor : Thomas Hart	Rossen Varbanov	April 5, 2019	220b	0.49
The Happy Helpers are hired by Ms. Mulch to help find perfect plants for customers on Mother's Day while she is away volunteering for the Mother's Day Brunch. The plant shop soon gets too busy when the customers come in where they even help to get the daisy that Bitsy plans to give to her mother back into good health. Though the daisy is accidentally taken by Pete who was looking for a plant to give to his mother.
47a	21a	"Mickey’s Fun-tastical Field Day"	Phil Weinstein	Kim Duran	Phillip Mosness	May 17, 2019	221a	0.40
During Fun-tastical Field Day on the first day of summer, Donald tries to do all the fun summer games himself even when he is paired up with Susie Beagleman. As for the other contestants, Elray Thunderboom is paired up with Mickey, Buddy is paired up with Daisy, Pearl is paired up with Minnie, Puck is paired up with Goofy and Cleo is paired up with Cuckoo-Loca.
47b	21b	"Clarabelle on the Mooo-ve!"	Broni Likomanov	Robert Ramirez; Story editor : Thomas Hart	Roger Dondis	May 17, 2019	221b	0.40
The girls reunite with Pippa Powers so that Clarabelle can try to become a Roadsterette. They put her through the initiation process. One of them involves a race through a pinball course. Song: "Get Ready, Get Set! To Be a Roadsterette!" sung by The Happy Helpers, Hilda and Pippa Powers
48a	22a	"Super-Charged: Donald's Roadster Round-Up"	Phil Weinstein	Mike Kubat	Tom Morgan	June 7, 2019	222a	0.54
The Roadster Racers load their racers onto the Rolling Roadster Rumbler for their trip to Kielbasa County for the Flash and Dash car show. While on a quick trip to the convenience store, Donald and Pluto accidentally lose all the roadsters along the way.
48b	22b	"The Daisy Dance!"	Broni Likomanov	Kim Duran; Story editor : Thomas Hart	Kyle Menke and Dave Williams	June 7, 2019	222b	0.54
The Happy Helpers take over teaching Clarabelle's dance class after Clarabelle twisted her leg while doing the tango. They teach Susie Beagleman, Elray Thunderboom, Buddy McBilly, Pearl McSnorter and Cleo Cluck. Meanwhile, Goofy takes Clarabelle to the doctor and runs into some obstacles along the way. Song: "Do Your Own Dance, To Your Own Beat" sung by The Happy Helpers
49a	23a	"Super-Charged: Two Close Friends"	Phil Weinstein	Mark Drop	Dave Bennett	June 14, 2019	223a	0.53
Mickey and Donald's bad day get worse when they accidentally become handcuffed together by Professor Von Drake's invention named High-tech handcuffs. Commander Heist and Lazlo steal the super-charger chip to super-charge his Heist-Mobile and swipe all the candies away from Mrs. Sweetums' candy store. Mickey and Donald decide to work together to stop Commander Heist by using the Hot Doggin' Hot Rod.
49b	23b	"Mr. Bigby's Big Night"	Broni Likomanov	Kim Duran	Rossen Varbanov	June 14, 2019	223b	0.53
The Happy Helpers, Mickey, Donald, Goofy, Chip and Dale help Mr. Bigby throw an anniversary party for his wife named Mrs. Bigby (Andrea Martin).
50a	24a	"Goof Quest"	Phil Weinstein	Mike Kubat	Phillip Mosness	July 5, 2019	224a	0.45
Goofy and Donald team up with Uncle Goof and Uncle Goof's exploration partner Alice Coop De Ville (Alice Cooper) to treasure hunt in Peru. Absent: Minnie Mouse and Daisy Duck
50b	24b	"Llama Drama"	Broni Likomanov	Mike Kubat; Story editor : Thomas Hart	Roger Dondis	July 5, 2019	224b	0.45
The Happy Helpers discover the only way to deliver a package is to travel by llama up a mountain. Note: This is the last episode to be released in Russi Taylor's lifetime. However, there are many episodes of her that were released after her death.
51a	25a	"Hi, Jinx!"	Phil Weinstein	Kim Duran	Tom Morgan	August 2, 2019	225a	0.52
Emmy Lou has moved into the apartment across from the Happy Helpers' office. Mickey meets Jinx the cat and gets the gang to help find the kitty a new home. He does attempts at the garage, Donald's lighthouse and Clara Cluck's farm. Meanwhile, Minnie, Daisy and Cuckoo-Loca set up Emmy Lou's apartment.
51b	25b	"Pete's Junkyard Helpers"	Broni Likomanov	Mark Drop; Story editor : Thomas Hart	Dave Williams	August 2, 2019	225b	0.52
The Happy Helpers run Pete's junkyard while he takes his Mama to lunch for her birthday where he wants the assignments done by 3:00 when he returns. They do different jobs like crushing old cars, salvaging parts for Mr. Bigby and trapping a troublesome opossum that is trying to eat the cake that is meant for Mama Pete.

=== Season 3: Mickey Mouse Mixed-Up Adventures (2019-2021) ===
Starting this season, Kaitlyn Robrock takes over as the voice of Minnie Mouse after the death of Russi Taylor in the episode Minnie's Bow-tel! and returned in Holiday in Hot Dog Hills.

No. overall	No. in season	Title	Directed by	Written by	Storyboarded by	Original release date	Prod. code	U.S. viewers (millions)
52a	1a	"Mickey's Mixed-Up Motor Lab"	Phil Weinstein	Mark Seidenberg	Tom Morgan	October 14, 2019	301a/V501	N/A
Mickey invents a new Motor Lab to add new upgrades to the gang's roadsters for a town event. Unfortunately, Chip and Dale tamper with the controls, causing all the roadsters to come out with different parts with comical outcomes. Note: The episode was dedicated "in loving memory" to Russi Taylor, who had voiced Minnie Mouse since 1986, as she died of colon cancer on July 26, 2019.
52b	1b	"Wishy Washy Helpers"	Broni Likomanov	Thomas Hart; Story editor : Thomas Hart	Dave Williams	October 14, 2019	301b/V501	N/A
When nobody has called them for days, the Happy Helpers traverse through Hot Dog Hills to find someone to help. They soon offer their services to Mrs. Bigby to make Bigby Towers' windows sparkle and shine. Minnie and Daisy compete to see who can get them cleaned first. Song: "What Works Better" sung by The Happy Helpers
53a	2a	"One Unicorny Day!"	Phil Weinstein	Mark Drop	Phillip Mosness	October 15, 2019	302a/V502	N/A
When Lisa's pony Penelope gets a cotton candy cone stuck on her head and is sprayed with sparkly paint at Minnie's Make Over Salon, the townsfolk think they've seen a real unicorn.
53b	2b	"The Happy Horse Helpers!"	Broni Likomanov	Kim Duran; Story editor : Thomas Hart	Rossen Varbanov	October 15, 2019	302b/V502	N/A
Minnie and Daisy are thrilled when Lisa asks them to give horseback riding lessons. Song: "Giddy Up, Penelope" sung by Minnie
54a	3a	"Animal Antics"	Phil Weinstein	Mike Kubat	Phillip Mosness	October 16, 2019	303a/V503	N/A
A Safari Park race provides a perfect opportunity for the gang to convert their roadsters into their favorite animals.
54b	3b	"Here, Kitty, Kitty, Kitty!"	Broni Likomanov	Mark Drop	Rossen Varbanov	October 16, 2019	303b/V503	N/A
When Lazlo runs away because Commander Heist is being mean to him, the latter asks the Happy Helpers to teach him how to be nice.
55a	4a	"Mickey's Monstrous Truck!"	Phil Weinstein	Mark Drop	Jason Dorf	October 17, 2019	304a/V504	N/A
Mickey accidentally turns his roadster into a monster truck.
55b	4b	"Minnie's Vacation Home!"	Broni Likomanov	Kim Duran; Story editor : Thomas Hart	Roger Dondis	October 17, 2019	304b/V504	N/A
Daisy and Cuckoo-Loca grow suspicious when Minnie keeps running errand after errand with no logical explanation. Song: "Hard Works Builds Good Things" sung by The Happy Helpers
56a	5a	"Mixed-Up for a Day!"	Phil Weinstein	Mark Drop	Tom Morgan	October 18, 2019	305a/V505	N/A
Mickey offers to let the person who finds the golden Mixed-Up Ticket drive through his special Mixed-Up Motor Lab.
56b	5b	"Princess Clarabelle!"	Broni Likomanov	Kim Duran; Story editor : Thomas Hart	Dave Williams	October 18, 2019	305b/V505	N/A
Minnie, Daisy, Cuckoo-Loca and Clarabelle take a vacation in the kingdom of Royalandia.
57a	6a	"A Gollywood Wedding!"	Phil Weinstein	Mark Drop	Ken Mitchroney	October 25, 2019	306a/V506	N/A
Mickey and his pals travel to New Delhi, India for the wedding of their friends Savi and Raj. Song: "Celebrate Love!" sung by Minnie, Savi and Raj
57b	6b	"No Dilly Dally in New Delhi!"	Broni Likomanov	Mike Kubat	Roger Dondis	October 25, 2019	306b/V506	N/A
The Happy Helpers assist an old friend who runs an auto-rickshaw business by being tuk-tuk drivers for the day. Song: "Let Life Surprise You" sung by The Beagles and Indians
58a	7a	"Mickey's Thanksgiving Fun Race!"	Phil Weinstein	Mark Drop; Story editor : Thomas Hart	Phillip Mosness	November 1, 2019	307a/V507	N/A
Mickey and the gang race Thanksgiving-themed racers. Mickey races with Donald and Pluto, Daisy races with her cousin Almanda, Minnie races with Maggie and Cuckoo-Loca, Goofy races with his Uncle Goof, Pete races his nephew Jimbo and Chip and Dale are racing together up until Thanksgiving dinner. During the Thanksgiving race, Donald insists Mickey to go fast for winning, but Mickey insists Donald of going slow and steady. The duo has to cooperate, think through and be a good team.
58b	7b	"Happy Thanksgiving Helpers!"	Broni Likomanov	Kim Duran; Story editor : Thomas Hart	Rossen Varbanov	November 1, 2019	307b/V507	N/A
Minnie, Daisy and Cuckoo-Loca invite all of their friends and Daisy's GramQuacker Lily for Thanksgiving dinner. Though various incidents happen before then that may affect the dinner. Song: "We're So Thankful" sung by Daisy
59a	8a	"Caution: Kids at Work!"	Phil Weinstein	Mike Kubat	Tom Morgan	November 8, 2019	308a/V508	N/A
It's Mini-Mechanics Day and Mickey's number one fan Buddy McBilly can't wait to get to work. He pairs up with Mickey, Elray Thunderboom pairs up with Goofy, Susie Beagleman pairs up with Donald, Millie pairs up with Minnie and Melody pairs up with Daisy. Buddy tries to help Mickey which starts to go comically awry.
59b	8b	"The Snoozy Doozy Pet and Breakfast!"	Broni Likomanov	Kim Duran; Story editor : Thomas Hart	Dave Williams	November 8, 2019	308b/V508	N/A
The Happy Helpers are too busy pet-sitting Pluto, Butch, Jinx, Goldie, Snowpuff and other pets while everyone heads to the Fancy Fine Dining Food Festival. They watch the pets at the Snoozy Doozy where it has a lack of customers as Mr. Doozy doesn't know how to treat his pet customers.
60a	9a	"Where's Mickey?"	Phil Weinstein	Mike Kubat	Phillip Mosness	November 15, 2019	309a/V509	N/A
Mickey must turn lemons into lemonade while having "one of those days".
60b	9b	"Cuckoo in Hot Dog Hills!"	Broni Likomanov	Kim Duran; Story editor : Thomas Hart	Rossen Varbanov	November 15, 2019	309b/V509	N/A
Cuckoo La-La and the rest of Cuckoo-Loca's cousins visit from Paris where they help Cuckoo-Loca, Minnie and Daisy.
61a	10a	"Campy Camper Day!"	Phil Weinstein	Mike Kubat	Tom Morgan	November 22, 2019	310a/V510	N/A
Mickey, Daisy and Donald had a hard time unplugging from electronic devices while camping. Song: "Out in the Outdoors Together" sung by Mickey and the gang
61b	10b	"Founder's Day Flounder"	Broni Likomanov	Kim Duran; Story editor : Thomas Hart	Dave Williams	November 22, 2019	310b/V510	N/A
The Happy Helpers help Clarabelle put on a play.
62a	11a	"Goofasaur!"	Phil Weinstein	Mike Kubat	Ken Mitchroney	December 13, 2019	311a/V511	N/A
A tour of Tokyo goes sideways when Goofy accidentally unleashes a robot dinosaur upon the city.
62b	11b	"Teahouse Helpers"	Broni Likomanov	Jorjeana Marie; Story editor : Thomas Hart	Roger Dondis	December 13, 2019	311b/V511	N/A
Minnie decides to take Daisy and Cuckoo-Loca to experience a traditional Japanese tea ceremony.
63a	12a	"Papa Pluto"	Phil Weinstein	Mike Kubat	Tom Morgan	January 17, 2020	312a/V512	0.40
Pluto finds a fallen bird's nest with three hatching eggs and becomes the baby birds' protector.
63b	12b	"Happy Valentine Helpers"	Broni Likomanov	Mark Drop; Story editor : Thomas Hart	Dave Williams	January 17, 2020	312b/V512	0.40
The Happy Helpers roll out their Do-It-Yourself trailer on Valentine's Day.
64a	13a	"Petey O'Pete"	Phil Weinstein	Mike Kubat	Kyle Menke	February 21, 2020	313a/V513	0.30
Pete tries to win money to buy Clarabelle a new blender after sending her blasting into the sky.
64b	13b	"Daisy Does It!"	Broni Likomanov	Kim Duran	David Stephan	February 21, 2020	313b/V513	0.30
Daisy leaves a mess at every turn while rushing through setting up a country fair.
65a	14a	"Mickey's New Mouse House"	Phil Weinstein	Mark Seidenberg	Ken Mitchroney	March 6, 2020	314a/V514	0.28
Mickey and his pals finish building Mickey's new house.
65b	14b	"Millie and Melody's Sleepover!"	Broni Likomanov	Kim Duran; Story editor : Thomas Hart	Roger Dondis	March 6, 2020	314b/V514	0.28
Millie and Melody have a birthday sleepover at Minnie and Daisy's vacation house. Song: "It's No Party Without You" sung by Millie and Melody
66a	15a	"Old McMickey Had a Farm"	Phil Weinstein and Jeff Gordon	Story by : Mark Seidenberg; Teleplay by : Mike Kubat	Phillip Mosness	March 27, 2020	315a/V515	0.39
Mickey and the gang renovate a rundown farm. Song: "Farmin' is Charmin'" sung by Mickey
66b	15b	"Happy Lab Helpers"	Broni Likomanov	Mark Drop; Story editor : Thomas Hart	Rossen Varbanov	March 27, 2020	315b/V515	0.39
When Professor Von Drake calls the Happy Helpers to watch his lab while he's away, they were given very important instructions.
67a	16a	"Hard Hat Diggity Dog!"	Phil Weinstein and Jeff Gordon	Mark Drop	Tom Morgan	April 10, 2020	316a/V516sno	0.43
Mickey enlists his friends to use their mixed-up construction vehicles to rebuild the playground for Bitsy's birthday party. Song: "Build it Up!" sung by Beau Black
67b	16b	"Hair-Raising Helpers!"	Broni Likomanov	Kim Duran; Story editor : Thomas Hart	Dave Williams	April 10, 2020	316b/V516	0.43
Pearl has nothing to wear to a family dance.
68a	17a	"Donald's Fast Food 500"	Phil Weinstein	Mark Drop	Tom Morgan	June 5, 2020	317a/V517	0.44
The gang plans to surprise Donald with a waffle breakfast for his birthday, but when Chip and Dale accidentally eat the waffles intended for Donald, they attempt to make it up to the birthday boy by hosting a food themed race centered on Donald's favorite meals.
68b	17b	"Mini-Helpers"	Broni Likomanov	Jorjeana Marie; Story editor : Thomas Hart	Dave Williams	June 5, 2020	317b/V517	0.44
Millie and Melody visit the Happy Helpers office for the day.
69a	18a	"Hanami Hijinks!"	Phil Weinstein	Mike Kubat	Phillip Mosness	July 3, 2020	TBA	0.38
The Sensational Six must save their picnic from a mischievous animal.
69b	18b	"Happy Harajuku Helpers!"	Broni Likomanov	Mark Drop; Story editor : Thomas Hart	Rossen Varbanov	July 3, 2020	TBA	0.38
The Happy Helpers must get their turnstyler back after their friend's assistant borrows it. Song: "Even You Can Harajuku!" sung by Minnie
70a	19a	"Mickey's Roommate"	Jeff Gordon and Phil Weinstein	Mark Drop	Tom Morgan	July 17, 2020	TBA	0.39
When Pete needs a place to crash, Mickey offers to let him stay at his place. Unfortunately, Pete is the worst roommate ever!
70b	19b	"Minnie's Bow-tel!"	Broni Likomanov	Kim Duran; Story editor : Thomas Hart	Dave Williams	July 17, 2020	TBA	0.39
The Happy Helpers redecorate Mr. Doozy's hotel! Note 1: This is the first episode to feature Kaitlyn Robrock as the voice of Minnie Mouse. Note 2: This episode was dedicated to the memory of Fred Willard who died on May 15, 2020.
71a	20a	"Mickey's Sporty Day"	Phil Weinstein	Mike Kubat	Ken Mitchroney	July 4, 2020	TBA	0.32
It's time for the annual Hot Dog Hillympics. As the reigning champ, Mickey is ready to win again, unless Pete has something to do about it.
71b	20b	"Go, Chili Dogs!"	Broni Likomanov	Story by : Kim Duran; Teleplay by : Mark Drop; Story editor : Thomas Hart	Roger Dondis	July 4, 2020	TBA	0.32
The Happy Helpers coach a baseball team. Song: "Keep on Swinging" sung by Beau Black
72a	21a	"Goofy's Hot Dog Harvest"	Phil Weinstein and Jeff Gordon	Mike Kubat	Phillip Mosness	August 14, 2020	TBA	0.29
Goofy grows a hot dog tree with the help of Pete and his potent fertilizer.
72b	21b	"Puppy Birthday to You!"	Broni Likomanov	Kim Duran; Story editor : Thomas Hart	Rossen Varbanov	August 14, 2020	TBA	0.29
The Happy Helpers throw Bitsy Beagleberg's puppy Phoebe a birthday party.
73a	22a	"Holiday in Hot Dog Hills"	Phil Weinstein and Jeff Gordon	Mark Drop	Phillip Mosness	September 11, 2020	TBA	0.24
Savi and Raj visits from New Delhi to check out an Art Museum. Sadly, the museum is closed and the gang tries to ease their disappointment.
73b	22b	"Happy Kitty Helpers"	Broni Likomanov	Ashley Mendoza; Story editor : Thomas Hart	Rossen Varbanov	September 11, 2020	TBA	0.24
Daisy looks after adorable kittens.
74a	23a	"Enough Stuff!"	Jeff Gordon and Phil Weinstein	Mark Drop	Steven Umbleby and Rossen Varbanov	September 18, 2020	TBA	0.23
Minnie suggests that Mickey starts giving away some of his hot dog-shaped collectibles.
74b	23b	"The Hippity Hop Horse Show"	Broni Likomanov	Kim Duran; Story editor : Thomas Hart	Roger Dondis	September 18, 2020	TBA	0.23
Penelope gets jealous when Minnie practices with Cassidy for the horse show.
75a	24a	"The Mystery of Hot Dog Lake!"	Jeff Gordon and Phil Weinstein	Mike Kubat	Tom Morgan	October 2, 2020	TBA	0.27
Pete thinks he sees a legendary creature known as the "Scronchasaur" in Hot Dog Hills Lake, so Mr. Bigby puts up a prize for the first person to snap its picture.
75b	24b	"Phantom Wing"	Broni Likomanov	Thomas Hart; Story editor : Thomas Hart	Dave Williams	October 2, 2020	TBA	0.27
When Daisy gets a mysterious note from her GramQuacker Lily, it leads her to believe that her grandmother is living a secret life as a superhero named Phantom Wing.
76a	25a	"Magic Tricked!"	Jeff Gordon and Phil Weinstein	Jorjeana Marie; Story editor : Thomas Hart	Phillip Mosness	October 16, 2020	TBA	0.29
Goofy and Elray audition for their favorite magician Trikini.
76b	25b	"Art From the Heart!"	Broni Likomanov	Kim Duran; Story editor : Thomas Hart	Rossen Varbanov	October 16, 2020	TBA	0.29
When art teacher Mrs. Matisse leaves to have her baby, the Happy Helpers fill in at the school. Song: "Create It from Your Heart!" sung by Alex Cartañá
77a	26a	"Duck, Duck Geese!"	Jeff Gordon and Phil Weinstein	Mike Kubat	Steven Umbleby	November 6, 2020	TBA	0.20
Goofy's bird call works a little too well when dozens of geese descend upon Hot Dog Hills.
77b	26b	"Shhhhh!"	Broni Likomanov	Mike Kubat	Roger Dondis	November 6, 2020	TBA	0.20
Billy Beagle struggles with the difference between inside and outside voices.
78a	27a	"Wheelchair Pals"	Jeff Gordon and Phil Weinstein	Mark Drop	Phillip Mosness	November 13, 2020	TBA	0.26
When Goofy has to use a wheelchair before his dance competition, his pal Chester teaches him a wheelchair dance. Song: "We Can Do Anything We Want to Do" sung by Goofy and Chester
78b	27b	"Super-Duper-Stitious Day!"	Broni Likomanov	Mike Kubat	Rossen Varbanov	November 13, 2020	TBA	0.26
Preparations for the Harvest Festival go sideways when Daisy discovers it's Friday the 13th.
79a	28a	"Goofy and Pete's Wild Ride"	Jeff Gordon and Phil Weinstein	Mark Drop	Tom Morgan	November 20, 2020	TBA	0.19
Goofy and Pete accidentally launch Billy's airship, hence resulting in a runaway blimp.
79b	28b	"The Happiest Day of All!"	Broni Likomanov	Kim Duran; Story editor : Thomas Hart	Dave Williams	November 20, 2020	TBA	0.19
The Happy Helpers pause their celebration for "What Makes You Happy Day" so that they can help Clarabelle. Song: "I'm Feeling All Day Happy" sung by Alex Cartañá
80a	29a	"All Aboard the Hot Diggity Dog Express"	Jeff Gordon and Phil Weinstein	Mark Seidenberg	Steven Umbleby	December 11, 2020	TBA	N/A
When Mickey rallies his pals to fix up the old historic steam engine called the Bratwurst Express, everyone (including Commander Heist) wants to be the engineer. Song: "All Aboard the Hot Diggity Dog Express" sung by Mickey and the gang
80b	29b	"Flea-Bee Jeebies"	Broni Likomanov	Mike Kubat	Roger Dondis	December 11, 2020	TBA	N/A
Pete's pooch needs a flea bath.
81a	30a	"There Goes Our Fun!"	Jeff Gordon and Phil Weinstein	Mark Drop	Tom Morgan	January 1, 2021	TBA	N/A
Mickey invites everyone (including Commander Heist and Lazlo) to join him for Mickey Day at the amusement park. Song: "Amusement Park Theme Song" sung by Mickey
81b	30b	"Don't Wake the Baby!"	Broni Likomanov	Kim Duran; Story editor : Thomas Hart	Dave Williams	January 1, 2021	TBA	N/A
The Happy Helpers babysit the Matisses' new baby boy Ollie.
82a	31a	"Donald's Dilemma"	Jeff Gordon	Mike Kubat	Phillip Mosness	January 22, 2021	TBA	N/A
Donald's day of doing chores is derailed when his Uncle Manny (Richard Kind) pays him a surprise visit. Song: "Then You're in Luck!" sung by Beau Black
82b	31b	"The Royal-ympics!"	Broni Likomanov	Kim Duran; Story editor : Thomas Hart	Rossen Varbanov	January 22, 2021	TBA	N/A
Princess Olivia of Royalandia asks the Happy Helpers for help with the Royal-Olympics.
83a	32a	"Dale's New Pal"	Jeff Gordon	Mike Kubat	Steven Umbleby	February 5, 2021	TBA	N/A
Dale befriends Gordy the groundhog, hence leaving Chip feeling all left out.
83b	32b	"The Cuckoo Turnstyler"	Broni Likomanov	Kim Duran; Story editor : Thomas Hart	Roger Dondis	February 5, 2021	TBA	N/A
When Cuckoo-Loca needs to be in two places at once, she uses the turnstyler to duplicate herself.
84a	33a	"It's a Hap-Hap-Happy Hot Dog Hills!"	Jeff Gordon	Mark Drop	Phillip Mosness	February 19, 2021	TBA	N/A
Buddy McBilly is so extremely happy that he makes it his job to make sure everyone in town is happy too. Song: "You Can Always Be Happy" sung by Buddy McBilly
84b	33b	"Happy Friend-iversary"	Broni Likomanov	Teleplay by : Mike Kubat; Story and teleplay by : Kim Duran; Story editor : Thomas Hart	Rossen Varbanov	February 19, 2021	TBA	N/A
Minnie and Daisy set up a surprise "Happy Friend-iversary" party for Cuckoo-Loca. Song: "We Are Bestest Friends Forever" sung by The Happy Helpers
85a	34a	"Crooner Mickey"	Jeff Gordon	Story by : Mark Drop; Story and teleplay by : Mike Kubat	Steven Umbleby	March 12, 2021	TBA	N/A
Minnie cheers up Mickey when he worries that his singing performance of Bow Be Mine won't be as special as hers.
85b	34b	"Once Upon a Lemonade Stand"	Broni Likomanov	Story by : Kim Duran; Story and teleplay by : Mike Kubat	Roger Dondis	March 12, 2021	TBA	N/A
Minnie and Daisy help Susie and Pearl build lemonade stands for a school fundraiser.
86a	35a	"Holi, By Golly"	Phil Weinstein and Jeff Gordon	Mike Kubat	Ken Mitchroney	March 27, 2021	TBA	N/A
Goofy and the gang must take a painting safely across New Delhi to the Museum of Modern Art.
86b	35b	"The Pink City"	Broni Likomanov	Kim Duran	Roger Dondis	March 27, 2021	TBA	N/A
The Happy Helpers help Priya take Missy the Elephant to her new sanctuary home in Jaipur. Note: This is the last episode where Russi Taylor voices Minnie Mouse.
87a	36a	"The Spooky Spook House!"	Jeff Gordon	Mark Drop	Tom Morgan	October 1, 2021	TBA	0.18
Mickey helps decorate Mr. Doozy's bed and breakfast for a chance to win the Halloween contest run by Alistair Coop DeVille, but soon lets his fears get the better of him.
87b	36b	"Clarabelle's Banana Splitz!"	Broni Likomanov	Kate Moran	Dave Williams	October 1, 2021	TBA	0.18
It's Clarabelle's dream to win the Bratwurst Bowling Championship, so the Happy Helpers be her against Clarabelle's old team. Note: This is the series finale.

== Shorts ==
=== Shorts overview ===
Series	Season	Episodes	Originally released	
Series	Season	Episodes	First released	Last released
Chip 'n Dale's Nutty Tales	1	8	November 13, 2017	November 25, 2017
Chip 'n Dale's Nutty Tales	2	10	December 31, 2018	November 30, 2019
Mickey Mouse Hot Diggity-Dog Tales	1	18	October 14, 2019	January 22, 2021

=== Chip 'n Dale's Nutty Tales (2017–2019) ===
==== Season 1 (2017) ====
No. overall	No. in season	Title	Original release date
1	1	"Mickey's Fireworks Fizzle"	November 13, 2017
Chip and Dale try to save a fireworks show after cloudy skies threaten to ruin a show for Mickey's birthday.
2	2	"Kite-Tastrophy!"	November 13, 2017
A friendly kite competition spins out of control when Chip and Dale try to outdo each other, leading to problems.
3	3	"Minnie Muffin Mayhem"	November 13, 2017
National Muffin Day turns into a giant problem when Chip and Dale try to help bake muffins for every citizen of Hot Dog Hills.
4	4	"Fishing for Treasure"	November 13, 2017
Chip and Dale join Mickey, Donald and Goofy on a fishing trip after losing their acorn in the ocean.
5	5	"Goofy's Corny Concerto"	November 13, 2017
During the Fall Festival, Chip and Dale help Goofy try to sell his ol' Corn Cobs at his snack stand to customers.
6	6	"All Goofed Up!"	November 13, 2017
Chip and Dale mix up a mail delivery between Goofy and Professor Von Drake, the dilemma multiplies beyond anyone's expectations.
7	7	"Bird Bath and Beyond"	November 13, 2017
Chip and Dale's plans to cool off on the hottest day of summer in the park birdbath are interrupted by a selfish pigeon.
8	8	"Snow Bunny's Business"	November 25, 2017
Chip and Dale help Minnie and Daisy build a snowman.

==== Season 2 (2018–2019) ====
No. overall	No. in season	Title	Original release date
9	1	"Sand Castle Hassle"	December 31, 2018
Mickey and Minnie's day at the beach turns into crabby chaos when Chip and Dale mistakenly swipe a hermit crab's shell, unaware that the shell is the crab's home sweet home.
10	2	"Nutty Movie Madness!"	December 31, 2018
While at the drive-in movie, Chip and Dale's acorn accidentally ends up in Donald's popcorn bucket, and now they must find a way to secretly get it back without disturbing Donald.
11	3	"Tree's a Crowd"	December 31, 2018
On a chilly winter night, Chip and Dale let a freezing worm sleep over, but after going to bed, the worm ends up leading the boys on a wiggly-wild chase inside Mickey's Garage.
12	4	"My Muddy Valentine"	December 31, 2018
After splashing Clarabelle's Valentine's Day dress with mud, Chip and Dale take her to the laundromat. While there, they accidentally create a tidal-bubble wave towards the dance.
13	5	"Butterfly Blooms!"	December 31, 2018
Chip and Dale accidentally ruin all of the flowers in Minnie and Daisy's garden. Luckily, the chipmunks discover a way to use butterflies to save the garden.
14	6	"Buzz Around Town"	December 31, 2018
Chip and Dale decide to help Cuckoo-Loca, Millie and Melody with their lemonade stand by becoming sign twirlers, but the wind sends them soaring all over town.
15	7	"Goofy's Missing Shoes Blues"	December 31, 2018
A pair of jumpy frogs have run away with Goofy's shoes, sending Chip, Dale and Goofy on the nuttiest and funniest foot chase ever.
16	8	"Musical Bowl of Nuts"	December 31, 2018
When Chip and Dale's acorn bounces on stage at a classical music concert, the chipmunks' nutty chase ends up creating the greatest musical Mickey and his friends have ever seen.
17	9	"A Nutty Halloween!"	October 4, 2019
Chip and Dale carve a giant jack-o'-lantern for a Halloween contest at Clarabelle's Barn.
18	10	"Tinsel Tussle!"	November 30, 2019
Chip and Dale have found the perfect Christmas tree, but before they can take it home, they must face a dancing groundhog who wants the tree for himself.

=== Mickey Mouse: Hot Diggity-Dog Tales (2019–2021) ===
No.	Title	Original release date
1	"Mickey's Tricky Tractor!"	October 14, 2019
2	"Pluto's Howl-A-Ween!"	October 15, 2019
3	"Catch That Weasel!"	October 16, 2019
4	"Surf's Up, Mickey!"	October 17, 2019
5	"Mickey's Breakfast Blast!"	November 15, 2019
6	"Goodnight Mickey"	November 22, 2019
7	"The Lights Before Christmas!"	November 30, 2019
8	"Mickey's Hot Dog Dance Party!"	January 3, 2020
9	"Mickey's Water Hose Woes!"	March 2, 2020
10	"Dust Bunny Dust-Up!"	March 3, 2020
11	"Bow-Wow Bath Time!"	March 4, 2020
12	"Mickey's Choo-Choo Trouble!"	March 5, 2020
13	"Mickey's Carnival Caper!"	March 6, 2020
14	"What Goes Pup, Must Come Down!"	June 19, 2020
15	"Flamingo-A-Go-Go"	September 11, 2020
16	"Mickey's Spooky Movie Night!"	October 2, 2020
17	"Mickey's Bow-Wow Birthday"	November 18, 2020
18	"Mickey's Special Delivery!"	January 22, 2021
