= The Rocketeer (TV series) =

American animated children's television series

- Also known as: Rocketeer (UK and other countries)
- Genre: Superhero; Adventure; Comic science fiction
- Based on: The Rocketeer by Dave Stevens
- Developed by: Nicole Dubuc
- Directed by: Carin-Anne Greco; Paul Demeyer; Monika Tomova
- Voices of: Kitana Turnbull; Frank Welker; Callan Farris; Billy Campbell; Kathy Najimy
- Theme music composer: Beau Black
- Opening theme: "Rocketeer to the Rescue", performed by Tammy Infusino
- Ending theme: "Heart of a Hero", performed by Tammy Infusino
- Composers: Beau Black (songs); Dominic Lewis (score)
- Country of origin: United States
- Original language: English
- No. of seasons: 1
- No. of episodes: 22 (42 segments)

Production
- Executive producers: Nicole Dubuc; Richard Marlis; Carmen Italia
- Producers: Peter Anderson; Donna Smith; Sammy Rivkin
- Running time: 22 minutes
- Production company: Wild Canary Animation (Note: Animation outsourced to Icon Creative Studio, Inc.)

Original release
- Network: Disney Junior
- Release: November 8, 2019 – July 25, 2020

The Rocketeer (titled Rocketeer internationally) is an American animated children's television series. It premiered on Disney Junior and Disney Channel in the United States on November 8, 2019, and on November 10 on Disney Junior in Canada. Based on the comic book superhero of the same name by Dave Stevens and inspired by the 1991 film, the series focuses on Katherine "Kit" Secord, a 7-year-old girl who receives the family jet pack for her 7th birthday. The Rocketeer was aimed at toddlers.

While the series received generally positive reviews from critics, it was cancelled after one season.

== Premise ==
In the town of Hughesville, seven-year-old Kit Secord learns she is secretly next in line to become The Rocketeer, a jet pack-wearing superhero who can fly. Armed with her sleek new gear and secret identity, Kit takes to the skies to protect Hughesville and its residents from danger. Assisting her on her heroic adventures are her best friend Tesh, bulldog sidekick Butch, and airplane mechanic grandfather Ambrose Secord.

== Characters ==
=== Main ===
- Katherine "Kit" Secord (voiced by Kitana Turnbull) is a 7-year-old girl who receives the family jet pack for her 7th birthday which reveals that she is next in line to become the Rocketeer, Hughesville's very own local town hero. She is the great-granddaughter of Cliff Secord. When operating as the Rocketeer, Kit's catchphrase is "Never fear, I'm the Rocketeer." She is a new character introduced in this series.
- Ambrose Secord (voiced by Frank Welker) is an 84-year-old man, Kit's grandfather and the son of Cliff Secord who works as a mechanic at the Hughesville Airport.
- Mitesh "Tesh" Cheena (voiced by Callan Farris) is Kit's 8-year-old best friend who serves as Ground Control when Kit takes to the skies. He is also the inventor of the hi-tech gadgets and upgrades for her jet pack. Tesh is the inventor of Kitcom and the Kit Tracker.
- Butch (vocal effects provided by Frank Welker) is Kit's pet bulldog and sidekick.

=== Recurring ===
- Dave Secord (voiced by Billy Campbell) is Kit's father who is a stunt pilot, which is where Katie gets her passion for flying. Campbell also played Cliff Secord, the original hero in the film, reprising his role in a newsreel seen in the episode "First Flight".
- Sareena Secord (voiced by Kathy Najimy) is Kit's mother who works as the manager and chef of the Bulldog Café.
- Valerie d'Avion (voiced by Navia Robinson) is Katie's flight school classmate and aspiring pilot whose parents own the Valkyrie Flight Academy. She owns her own plane called the Korsican Skyfang 75. Her superhero identity is the Valkyrie.
  - Snickerdoodle (vocal effects provided by Frank Welker) is Valerie's pet chihuahua.

=== Villains ===
- Laura and Harley (voiced by Maria Bamford and Kari Wahlgren respectively) are two thieving sisters who like stealing things to use in their heists which often has them running from the authorities and the Rocketeer. Harley serves as the brains of the group and Laura has a ditzy personality. They are a clear homage of the golden-age comedy duo Laurel and Hardy.
- Sylvester Slapdash (voiced by Maurice LaMarche) is a thief and a master of disguise who utilizes many costumes in his capers. He is also known as the "Costumed Bandit". Sylvester is a homage of early 20th Century vaudeville actor and quick change artist Sylvester Schaffer Jr.
  - Lilith (vocal effects provided by Frank Welker) is Sylvester's pet ferret. Lilith is a homage to Sylvester Schaffer Jr.'s wife and assistant Lily Kruger.
- The Great Orsino (voiced by Charlie Adler) is a magician that targets Kit's jet pack so that he can become the first flying magician. He also possesses snap-activated disappearing act which comes in handy when getting away from the Rocketeer upon defeat.
  - Deany (voiced by Parvesh Cheena) is the Great Orsino's hapless magician's assistant. In "Super Deany", it is revealed that Deany has an engineering background where he helped to fix the Rocketeer's jet pack. His name is a play on Harry Houdini which is reinforced by frequent dialog of "Who? Deany".
- Doctor Doodlebug (voiced by Luca Padovan) is the supervillain identity of child prodigy Rolland Poly who wears pillbug-themed armor. He invents machines suitable for his schemes out of the garbage that he steals. Doctor Doodlebug is one of a few villains to avoid being apprehended by the Rocketeer.
  - Newton (voiced by D. C. Douglas) is an A.I. that resides in Doctor Doodlebug's wristwatch. Newton advises his master on the course of action to take.
- Xena Treme (voiced by Stephanie Lemelin) is an extreme sports athlete with a big ego that she masks with a laid-back personality who is determined to stay on the top through whatever means possible.
- Cast-Iron Chef (voiced by Ted Allen) is a food truck chef who will target any secret recipes in order to improve his business. He wields a high-tech gauntlet that enables him to use any kitchen tool it contains. In "Sitti's Visit", it was revealed that his recipe-targeting motive comes from the fact that his father never let him in on his family recipes. Kit and Sitti persuade him to drop the recipe-targeting motive and create his own cookbook.
- Norman Sinclair (voiced by Raphael Alejandro) is the descendant of Neville Sinclair and heir to Sinclair Air. He conspires to become the new Rocketeer by taking the jet pack from Kit so that he can impress his father. He once pulled this off enough for Kit to enlist Valkyrie, Sylvester Slapdash, and Doctor Doodlebug into getting it back.

=== Hughesville citizens ===
- Lucille (voiced by Marianne Muellerleile) is an old lady who works as a cashier at the Bulldog Café.
- Alfonzo (voiced by Eric Bauza) is a sous chef at the Bulldog Café.
- Officer Crowfoot (voiced by Robbie Daymond) is a Native American police officer who arrests the bad guys thwarted by the Rocketeer.
- Mayor Primshell (voiced by Kevin Michael Richardson) is the mayor of Hughesville.
- Richard (voiced by Julian Edwards) is a boy who resides in Hughesville.
  - Taffy is Richard's cat that is often rescued by the Rocketeer.
- Mr. Coleman (voiced by Eugene Byrd) is Kit's teacher at the Valkyrie Flight Academy.
- Ben (voiced by Antonio Raul Corbo) is a boy who is Kit's classmate at the Valkyrie Flight Academy.
- Logan (voiced by Ian Chen) is a boy who is Kit's classmate at the Valkyrie Flight Academy.
- River (voiced by Kai Zen) is a girl who is a fellow Trailblazer to Kit and Tesh.
- Farmer McGinty (voiced by Mark L. Taylor) is an elderly farmer.
- Goose (voiced by Roger Craig Smith) is a clown that wears an airplane costume.
- Malcolm (voiced by Carlos Alazraqui) is an air traffic controller who works at Hughesville's air field.
- Aarush Cheena (voiced by Rahul Kohli) is Tesh's father, owner of Cheena Hardware, and Scoutmaster of the Hughesville Trailblazers.
- Chandi Cheena (voiced by Sarayu Rao) is Tesh's mother.
- Sonal Udana Cheena (voiced by Sarayu Rao) is Tesh's baby sister born in "Special Delivery". Her middle name Udana, which means "flying", is in honor of the Rocketeer.
- Polly Poly (voiced by D'Arcy Carden) is the mother of Rolland Poly who is unaware of her son's activities as Doctor Doodlebug.|
- Irma Philpot (voiced by Susan Silo) is an old lady who lives near Hughesville.
  - The Critter Gang are a group of animals that are friends with Irma. They consist of a moose, a hawk, a raccoon, two foxes, and some squirrels.
- Chantal d'Avion (voiced by Yvette Nicole Brown) is Valerie's mother and co-owner of the Valkyrie Flight Academy.
- Captain Michael d'Avion (voiced by Imari Williams) is Valerie's father, Navy Captain, and co-owner of the Valkyrie Flight Academy.

== Episodes ==
No.	Title	Directed by	Written by	Storyboarded by	Original release date	Prod. code	U.S. viewers (millions)
1a	"First Flight"	Carin-Anne Anderson and Paul Demeyer	Nicole Dubuc	Maria Nguyen, Ray Smyth, and Arthur Valencia	November 8, 2019	101	0.39
On her seventh birthday, Kit Secord learns that she will not be taking flying lessons as she has always wanted. Instead, Lucille the cashier reveals that she had gotten a mysterious package. Inside is the original Rocketeer helmet which is confirmed by her grandfather Ambrose, son of Cliff Secord. She tests out the jetpack, but her inexperience forces Ambrose to ground her until she is ready. When her father Dave suffers engine trouble during a flight show, Kit dons the modified outfit and rescues him as the new Rocketeer. Ambrose decides to let Kit be the new Rocketeer after all. Song: "Heart of a Hero" performed by Tammy Infusino
1b	"Pilot Error"	Carin-Anne Anderson	Nicole Dubuc	Ray Smyth	November 8, 2019	101	0.39
Kit continues to train with the help of Ambrose and her tech-savvy friend Tesh Cheena. A pair of sister thieves named Laura and Harley steal a ladder, but the Rocketeer's inability to hear Tesh causes her to lose them. He incorporates a communicator onto the helmet, but its voice altering functions distract her from getting a fishing pole stolen. Ambrose suggests that they listen to one another and perfect the helmet functions just as Laura and Harley steal a mini vacuum. The Rocketeer catches the two of them trying to steal from a jewelry store and thanks Tesh for his help.
2a	"Skyway Robbery"	Paul Demeyer	Nicole Dubuc	Arthur Valencia	November 8, 2019	102	0.35
While Tesh tries to perfect the camera function on Kit's helmet, Sylvester Slapdash and his ferret Lilith continue to rob places with their disguises. They pose as a banker to steal money from the Bulldog Café, but Rocketeer catches on quick with the help of her dog Butch and gives chase where she retrieves the money, but losing Slapdash and Lilith. They resolve to steal the jetpack and manage to do so. However, Tesh discovers that the helmet managed to record footage of them stealing it and they catch up with the thieves. Slapdash tries to escape with the jetpack, but his lack of knowledge of it causes him to crash and he is promptly arrested. Though Lilith makes a break for it causing Kit to become Rocketeer to catch her.
2b	"A Doggone Adventure"	Paul Demeyer	Brian Hohlfeld	Arthur Valencia	November 8, 2019	102	0.35
Ms. Snootsmith comes to the airbase to have her plane scrubbed. Her dog Honey gets along well with Butch, but she thinks of him as too common. Nevertheless, the dogs sneak off to have fun and romance. Meanwhile, Laura and Harley plot to steal Honey's diamond collar. After a few setbacks, they decide to simply kidnap her and steal Ambrose's truck. While Ambrose calls the police, Kit becomes the Rocketeer and flies after the duo. Butch and Honey manage to outwit Laura and Harley as the Rocketeer saves the day. Laura and Harley are arrested by Officer Crowfoot while Ms. Snootsmith agrees to allow Honey and Butch to have a playdate. Song: "Side by Side With You" performed by Beau Black
3a	"Ground Control to Rocketeer"	Carin-Anne Anderson	Brian Hohlfeld	Kate Brusk	November 15, 2019	103	0.27
Tesh has trouble keeping up with Kit on her missions and is further disappointed when his bike falls off a cliff. He decides to upgrade his bike into the Sonic Flash, but fills it with some rather pointless accessories and once again, the bike falls apart. Feeling that he has no place being part of Kit's team, she and Ambrose encourage him keep going and together build a better water powered vehicle that even allows Butch to sit in a sidecar. Together, they help a fellow pilot land her plane after her landing gear sticks and Tesh takes the name Ground Control. Song: "Fast" sung by Tesh
3b	"Save the Statue"	Paul Demeyer	Claudia Silver	Rudi Berden	November 15, 2019	103	N/A
As the Rocketeer chases Laura and Harley, the sisters jump a curb and accidentally destroy the Rocketeer statue. The town is saddened and Mayor Primshell informs Kit that the town does not have the money to replace it. Kit gets the idea to throw a big air show and raise the money for the statue. Laura and Harley decide to use the opportunity to perform a heist. The show is running smoothly, but the Rocketeer catches the thieves who steal a clown plane and hands them over to Officer Crowfoot. With Ambrose's help, the Rocketeer manages to land the plane. The show is a success as the town installs a new statue as Kit rubs the foot for good luck.
4a	"Carnival Caper"	Carin-Anne Anderson	Kendall Michele Haney	Kate Brusk	November 22, 2019	104	0.26
Kit saves the magician the Great Orsino and his assistant Deany. At the carnival, a child acknowledges that Orsino uses wires instead of actually flying like the Rocketeer. Growing jealous, Orsino plots to steal the jetpack. The following night, Orsino feigns Deany in trouble and Kit becomes the Rocketeer the save them. Upon being congratulated, Orsino makes off with the jetpack as Kit, Teash, Ambrose and Butch run around the carnival looking for them. Orsino takes off, but the Rocketeer manages to turn off the jetpack with a baseball and rescues the civilians. Orsino and Deany escape however.
4b	"Songbird Soars Again"	Paul Demeyer	Claudia Silver	Rudi Berden	November 22, 2019	104	0.26
Kit ends up in the yard of Old Lady Hopper, only to see that she has the famous biplane the Songbird; owned by daredevil May Songbird. Kit attempts to get close to her, but she stubbornly turns her down. She eventually lets Kit and Tesh help fix her plane and becomes warmer, but gets agitated after it stalls. May reveals her in youth that her plane stalled and though the Rocketeer saved her, she became despondent. While on a mission, the Rocketeer's jetpack gets damaged and Tesh calls upon May to come and rescue her from the sky. May becomes more sociable and thanks Kit for believing in her. Song: "Walking on Air" sung by May Songbird
5a	"Downhill Derby"	Paul Demeyer	Greg Johnson	Arthur Valencia	December 6, 2019	V105	0.24
As Kit and Tesh prepare for the downhill derby, child genius Rolland Poly, a.k.a. Doctor Doodlebug, puts together a snowmaking machine so that he can have the advantage during the race. The race begins and things seem to be going Rolland's way until the Peppy Penguin snowcone machine begins to spurt grape snowcones and soon giant orange rocks of hale. The other racers fall out while Rolland's cart gets destroyed. Kit becomes the Rocketeer and flies into the sky to defeat the snowmaking machine and saves the day. Rolland leaves defeated while the kids alter their carts to redo the race in the flavored snow. Song: "Doodlebug Manifesto" sung by Doctor Doodlebug
5b	"Flight Class Heroes"	Carin-Anne Anderson	Claudia Silver	Ray Smyth	December 6, 2019	V105	N/A
Kit attends flight school with her friends Logan, Ben and Valerie and gets a first hand look at the AVA 4000, an experimental pilotless plane. Ben accidentally activates the plane as their teacher Mr. Coleman helplessly watches them fly away. The kids learn that AVA 4000 still has some bugs and contact Mr. Coleman who directs them to manually override the plane. When one of their wheels breaks off, Kit becomes the Rocketeer and gets a giant doughnut to replace it. Valerie overcomes her insecurities to help the group land the plane safely back at the airfield.
6a	"Hypnotic Hughesville"	Carin-Anne Anderson	Kendall Michele Haney	Kate Brusk	December 13, 2019	V106	0.32
After Deany finds a hypno-wheel, The Great Orsino gets the idea to use it to get the Rocketeer's jetpack. He has everyone hypnotized into their favorite animal, as it is the only thing he can do, as Kit, Tesh and Butch return to town to see all the chaos. It turns out to be too much for Orsino and Deany. Kit as the Rocketeer flies around to try and help the citizens. Orsino hypnotizes Tesh as the Rocketeer feigns getting hypnotized into a dog. She tricks the villains into entering a jail cell, but they manage to escape behind her back. The Rocketeer and Tesh discover that water is the answer as they return everyone in Hughesvillve back to normal.
6b	"The Piggy Bank Caper"	Monica Tomova	Brian Hohlfeld	Derek Lee Thompson	December 13, 2019	V106	0.31
Sylvester loses Lilith's precious coin, but it is found by Kit who puts it in Paisley, her piggy-bank. Sylvester disguises himself as a plumber and steals it, but he cannot break it open due to Ambrose having reinforced it for Kit. Paisley ends up landing in the back of Alfonso's truck as he heads to the fair to get his pie judged. Kit spots Sylvester and gives chase as the Rocketeer. After a big chase, Kit gets Paisley and learns about the coin. Ambrose drills a hole and Kit returns the coin to a grateful Sylvester and Lilith. Kit asks them to thieve less, but Sylvester is humorously caught with her bike.
7a	"X-Treme Hero"	Monica Tomova	Claudia Silver	Katya Bowser	January 10, 2020	110 V107	0.31
Tesh modifies the Sonic Flash for the Extreme Sports Games and is excited to meet his idol Xena Treme. As he and Kit watch Xena perform, an avalanche follows her and Kit goes to rescue her. Xena is revealed to be conceited and pompous, but takes an interest in seeing Tesh's modified bike. Impressed, she offers to buy it, but he turns her down. At night, she steals it and Tesh and Kit as the Rocketeer gives chase through the city. Tesh catches up with her and the Rockteer has her reported and disqualified. The next day, Tesh performs and wins the first place trophy naming his new move after Kit. Xena slips away and rides off on her skateboard vowing that they haven't seen the last of her.
7b	"Hot on the Trail"	Paul Demeyer	Kristofer Wellman	Rudi Berden	January 10, 2020	110 V107	0.31
Kit, Tesh, and their friends are going hiking with Tesh's dad to see the Firefalls; a waterfall that is lit up by a giant gem at sundown. Laura and Harley, hearing about the gem, plot to steal it for themselves. During the hike, Tesh tries to use his inventions with lackluster results while the sisters steal their things. Kit discovers them and becomes the Rocketeer. As the sisters steal the gem, the Rocketeer gives chase down a hill before they nearly fall off a cliff. The Rocketeer catches them, leaves them tied up for Officer Crowfoot, and puts the gem back in time for the others to come. Tesh forgets his equipment to appreciate the Firefalls. Harley even appreciates the Firefalls as Officer Crowfoot closes in on her and Laura. Song: "Share the Open Air with You" performed by Tammy Infusino
8a	"Valerie the Valkyrie"	Paul Demeyer	Claudia Silver	Rudi Berden	January 17, 2020	108	0.34
Valerie is about to perform sky maneuvers in her personalized plane when Kit suits up as the Rocketeer to save someone. Jealous that the Rocketeer is front news as opposed to her, Valerie creates a costume and becomes the Valkyrie. As Valkyrie, Valerie starts off with manipulating scenarios, but quickly becomes a legitimate hero that grows more popular than the Rocketeer. Kit starts feeling sad until Ambrose tells her that it is not a competition. Soon, The Rocketeer saves Valerie from danger and becomes popular again. Incensed, Valerie decides to become a super-villain instead. Song: "Valkyrie Theme Song" sung by Valerie
8b	"Follow that Bulldog"	Carin-Anne Anderson	Kristofer Wellman	Kate Brusk	January 17, 2020	108	0.34
Kit and her mother Sareena are preparing Lebanese dishes for the Bulldog Café. The Cast-Iron Chef plots to steal their family cook book and make their dishes his own. He ineptly tries to break into the restaurant's attic where the book is being kept. Unable to break in, he decides to simply rip the Bulldog part of the restaurant off with his food truck. Tesh informs Kit about what has occurred and they speed off after it. Kit manages to climb aboard to get her jetpack, change into the Rocketeer, catche Cast-Iron Chef, and restore the Bulldog to the restaurant as Tesh hands Cast-Iron Chef to Officer Crowfoot. Kit then asks Sareena for an extra Lebanese food day. When that occurs, even Cast-Iron Chef and Officer Crowfoot even enjoy it.
9a	"Recipe for Disaster"	Paul Demeyer	Brian Hohlfeld	Arthur Valencia	January 24, 2020	105 V109	0.23
As Kit and Sareena prepare for Lebanese Lunch Day using recipes made by Kit's grandmother Sitti, they are visited by a food truck chef called the Cast-Iron Chef who gets a taste of their food. He offers to buy the recipe from them, but they refuse as it is family history. Cast-Iron Chef breaks into the Bulldog in the middle of the night and steals the cook book and by morning begins to sell the dishes. Kit and Tesh attempt to get the book back, but he flees. Ending up on a railroad track. Cast-Iron Chef's food truck nearly goes over a cliff, but the Rocketeer manages to save the cookbook and villain in time. As Cast-Iron Chef is arrested, it is revealed by Officer Crowfoot that he researched his rap sheet that mentioned that he stole dishes around the world. Song: "Enjoy Your Meal" performed by Leila Milki Note: This episode chronologically takes place before "Follow that Bulldog".
9b	"The Critter Gang"	Carin-Anne Anderson	Kendall Michele Haney	Ray Smyth	January 24, 2020	105 V109	0.23
Animals suddenly begin showing up all over Hughesville stealing food. The animals come from Irma Philpot who is unknowingly sending them out to do things for her. When she mentions that she needs more carrot seeds, the animals show up in Tesh's backyard and steal a couple of bags. She finally mentions that she misses her old jewelry and the animals begin to steal everyone's belongings. The Rocketeer and Tesh chase after them and discover what has been happening. Horrified, Mrs. Philpot apologizes and personally orders the Critter Gang to give the belongings back along with Dave's pilotwings.
10a	"Cleared for Takeoff"	Michael Daedalus Kenny	Nicole Dubuc	Bill Breneisen, Tamal Henley, and Robert Sledge	February 7, 2020	V110	0.32
Kit, still getting used to her double identity, wants to prove that she has what it takes to take flight classes. To test her, Sareena gives her a chore to deliver the lunches to the people of Hughesville by one o' clock. In the middle of it all, she helps Mayor Primshell plant sunflower seeds, Valerie get her homework back, and Malcolm direct air traffic after his antenna breaks. Kit tries to deliver Ambrose's lunch, but he is nowhere to be seen. Believing she has failed, Sareena reveals that she heard what she did and Ambrose gets his lunch. Sareena finally lets Kit take flight school. Song: "A Beautiful View" performed by Tammy Infusino Note: This episode, along with "First Class", chronologically take place after "First Flight" and before "Flight Class Heroes".
10b	"First Class"	Carin-Anne Anderson	Nicole Dubuc and Brian Hohlfeld	Tamal Henley and Ray Smyth	February 7, 2020	V110	0.32
Continuing from the last episode, it is Kit's first day in Flight School as she meets her classmates Ben, Logan, and the daughter of the school's headmaster Valerie. Kit thinks Valerie is cool as she owns her own plane which she flies, but is overconfident. Kit begins to hang out with her, but nearly neglects Tesh. Thinking that she is only interested in her trophies and collection of planes, Valerie tries to show Kit her new plane, but flies it in stormy weather. Kit rescues her and guides her to safety. Afterwards, Valerie apologizes for her behavior and Kit offers to be a true friend to her. Note: This episode, along with "Cleared for Takeoff", chronologically take place after "First Flight" and before "Flight Class Heroes".
11a	"Underground Doodlebug"	Monica Tomova	Kendall Michele Haney	Katya Bowser	February 21, 2020	V111	0.23
Hughesville is opening a Rocketeer museum and Ambrose is donating his one of a kind Rocketeer action figure from his youth. Roland decides to steal the toy for himself as Doctor Doodlebug. Creating a tunneler from a Sparkle Sunset Unicorn Ride and other junk, he goes underneath the museum and swipes the toy. In the morning, everyone discovers the theft and Kit as the Rocketeer, Tesh and Butch find the hole and go through it. They encounter Doctor Doodlebug and give chase where the toy nearly falls down a cavern. The Rocketeer manages to retrieve it while Doctor Doodlebug escapes, vowing revenge. The action figure is returned and Ambrose thanks Kit and Tesh for the rescue. Song: "Sparkle Sunset Unicorn Song" sung by Sparkle Sunset Unicorn Tractor-Machine
11b	"Bruce Goose"	Paul Demeyer	Brian Hohlfeld	Rudi Berden	February 21, 2020	V111	0.23
A gosling gets separated from his flock and begins to follow Butch after seeing his ears. With no other choice, Kit and Tesh take the gosling, whom they name Bruce, home with them. Butch ends up growing soft and accepts him as a member of his family. As Winter approaches, Ambrose informs them that Bruce will need to leave and teach him to fly. They find Bruce's flock, but he does not want to leave Butch, so they try to keep them, but this causes problems. Tesh creates a harness and Kit as the Rocketeer takes Butch up to the sky to have one final goodbye to Bruce and his family before they leave. Song: "A Friend Like You" performed by Beau Black
12a	"Runaway Lilith"	Carin-Anne Anderson	Kendall Michele Haney	Ben Adams	March 13, 2020	V201	0.33
Sylvester and Lilith get into an argument about flying that results in the latter leaving to achieve her goal. Realizing that he messed up, Sylvester calls upon the Rocketeer's help in finding her. Meanwhile, Lilith tricks the Critter Gang into helping her rob a model airplane. During their search, Kit tells Sylvester that he needs to listen to Lilith more. They discover her and she escapes in the model plane only to get stuck on a cliff. With the Rocketeer's help, Sylvester rescues her and they make amends by returning the model plane and then trying the plane simulation. Song: "Ferret on a Mission" performed by Beau Black
12b	"The Hughesville Howler"	Monica Tomova	Claudia Silver	Derek Lee Thompson	March 13, 2020	V201	0.33
Sylvester and Lilith decide to revive the legend of the Hugesville Howler by informing the townsfolk that it was spotted in the woods. While Sylvester disguises himself, Lilith robs the stores blind. Kit and Tesh begin to pick up on clues that the Howler is a fake and put two and two together. Kit as the Rocketeer races back into town and stops Lilith's crime spree with Lilith being arrested by Officer Crowfoot. Then she then to the woods and capturing Sylvester after he nearly falls from a cliff. As he is carted away by Officer Crowfoot, Kit and Tesh spot the real Howler and manage to take a photo. Though just like the previous one, it is blurry.
13a	"Friends and Family Picnic"	Paul Demeyer	Claudia Silver	Arthur Valencia	April 3, 2020	V202	N/A
It is the annual Hughesville picnic and everyone is participating in the competitions being held. Valerie is sad to learn that her father Michael is having difficulty arriving as his plane has been grounded. He attempts to take a jeep to town, but it breaks down. As Valerie continues to bemoan how she rarely gets to see her father, Kit decides to suit up as the Rocketeer and sets out to bring Michael back into town. She is successful as she manages to bring him in time for the egg parachute competition as he and Valerie win first place, much to their enjoyment.
13b	"Lights, Camera, Action Hero!"	Carin-Anne Anderson	Kendall Michele Haney	Ray Smyth	April 3, 2020	V202	N/A
While cashing Laura and Harley, Kit discovers that she has trouble making u-turns in the air. She has Tesh record her so that she can improve, but he accidentally records her removing her helmet. In a hurry to get to dinner, he forgets to delete the footage as Laura and Harley steal it along with one of his ramps. Tesh discovers what happened as he and Kit as the Rocketeer try to prevent the sisters from stealing a valuable comic book. They manage to capture the sisters and learn that Laura accidentally recorded over the footage. Afterwards, Tesh puts together a music video about Kit as the Rocketeer.
14a	"Special Delivery"	Monica Tomova	Brian Hohlfeld	Katya Bowser	April 10, 2020	V203	0.48
Tesh is feeling down as his mother Chandi is about to have a baby girl. Aarush's train has stalled due to a rockslide and Chandi is quickly going into labor. Kit suits up as the Rocketeer and flies off to remove the rocks as her parents help Chandi get to the hospital, all the while Tesh begins to slowly warm up to the idea of being an older brother. When the train stalls again, the Rocketeer flies off and gets Aarush and brings him to the hospital just in time. In the evening, Chanid gives birth to Sonal Udana and Tesh celebrates by singing a song to her so that she will feel at home. Song: "Welcome, Sonal" sung by Tesh
14b	"The Hunt for Hughesberries"	Paul Demeyer	Kendall Michele Haney	Rudi Berden	April 10, 2020	V203	0.48
The Bulldog Café is serving hugesberry pie, but runs out due to not having enough hugesberries. Kit and Tesh are tasked with getting more from a single bush, but the Cast-Iron Chef wants the bush for himself after the pies made by his Auto-Pie-Matic turn out to be a failure. A pair of squirrels realize this and alert Kit and Tesh who suit up to try and stop him. Cast-Iron Chef manages to make off with the bush, but the squirrels locate his truck and the kids go after him defeating his pie making machine and getting the bush back from him. After making more pies, Kit was able to offer a defeated Cast-Iron Chef a slice for himself on the condition he share it which he begrudingly does when the squirrels show up.
15a	"Super Deany"	Carin-Anne Anderson	Brian Hohlfeld	Jake Kim	April 17, 2020	V204	0.40
The jetpack begins acting up and suddenly flies away with Kit and Tesh in pursuit. It falls into the hands of Orsino who tries to use it, but once again fails to grasp its complexities. Oddly enough, Deany figures out how to use it and Orsino has him become their next headlining act. When Deany rescues a little girl, he decides to become Super Deany and flies around Hughesville, saving everyone. However, the jetpack begins to act up again and Kit flies in via Ambrose's plane to save him. Deany fixes the jetpack for her and Orsino has a slightly better appreciation for him. Song: "Super Deany to the Rescue" sung by Deany and the Hughesville Citizens
15b	"Dr. Doodlebug's Fair Game"	Monica Tomova	Kendall Michele Haney, Brian Hohlfeld, and Claudia Silver	Derek Lee Thompson	April 17, 2020	V204	0.40
Kit and Tesh enter their art at the county fair with the latter's being a movement piece that does not seem to work. Not only that, but the ferris wheel is closed for repairs. Meanwhile, Rolland wants to win a pillbug plushie after his favorite ride gets shutdown. As Doctor Doodlebug, he combines the old Hippo Ride, his mom's vacuum, and other junk to form the Hippo Vacuumus. Upon arriving at the fair, Doctor Doodlebug sucks up his prize, but it begins to go haywire and sucks up his A.I. watch Newton. During the commotion, Tesh's art piece moves and the ferris wheel gets fixed. Teaming up with Doctor Doodlebug, the Rocketeer destroys the machine. Doctor Doodlebug grabs Newton and flees while Kit and Tesh enjoy the fair.
16a	"The Valkyrie Cleans-Up"	Carin-Anne Anderson	Kendall Michele Haney	Ray Smyth	April 24, 2020	V205	0.48
Valerie wants to hang out with Kit, but her family has been assigned to clean the Rocketeer statue. Wanting to help, Valerie suits up as the Valkyrie and takes the statue to the lake to clean it, but it falls to the bottom. The Mayor puts out an award to find it with Laura and Harley, Sylvester Slapdash and Lilith, and The Great Orsino and Deany all trying to do so dishonestly, though the Rocketeer exposes them. Eventually, they realize that the Valkyrie is behind it just as Valerie tries to bring it back. After admitting her fault and the reason for it, the girls team up and bring it back to the grateful townspeople. Afterwards, Kit and Valerie hang out. Song: "Best Team Ever" performed by Beau Black
16b	"The Bank Job"	Paul Demeyer	Nicole Dubuc	Arthur Valencia	April 24, 2020	V205	0.48
Tesh has been trying to save up his money to buy a new flipboard (he has a yellow one and wants a red one). As he puts it in the bank, he and Kit spot Laura and Harley entering to "get a job". Laura gets hired, but seemingly gives up on their plan forcing Harley to rob the bank alone. Tesh performs various jobs to earn more money, forcing Kit as the Rocketeer to briefly give up chasing Harley to help him. Eventually, Harley breaks into the bank only to learn that Laura had been performing the heist alone, making her proud. They get caught anyway and Kit simply repaints Tesh's flipboard for him.
17a	"Big Top Problems"	Monica Tomova	Brian Hohlfeld	Katya Bowser	July 4, 2020	TBA	N/A
Kit and Tesh are visiting the circus when during an act by The Great Orsino, people's things are suddenly stolen. Kit, Tesh and Butch disguise themselves to help the ringmaster see who the culprit is. At first, they believe it is The Great Orsino, but he and Deany are also victims and reluctantly help the heroes. Eventually, they discover that the real culprits are Sylvester and Lilith who had replaced local clown Goose as Bozo and have been robbing the previous towns. With The Great Orsino's help, Kit as the Rocketeer and Tesh are able to out Sylvester and Lilith and capture them before they put on another circus show for real. Song: "The Circus is in Town" sung by Ringmaster
17b	"One Trick Phony"	Paul Demeyer	Kristofer Wellman	Rudi Berden	July 4, 2020	TBA	N/A
Kit is spending time with Valerie in her new plane, but forcers her to ground it after one of the engines begins making a funny noise, and offers to fix it soon. Wanting to perform more dangerous stunts, Xena Treme resurfaces and convinces Valerie to let her use her plane so that she can pull off various snowboarding stunts. This turns out to be dangerous and Kit as the Rocketeer intervenes. As Valerie goes to apologize to Kit for not believing her about Xena, Xena steals her plane only for it to sputter in the air. Kit rescues her and lands the plane. Afterwards, Kit and Valerie fly in a new modified plane.
18a	"Pack-A-Doodle"	Carin-Anne Anderson	Kendall Michele Haney, Greg Johnson, and Claudia Silver	Jake Kim	July 11, 2020	TBA	N/A
Kit and Tesh are going on another camping trip with the Trailblazers when Rolland is forced by his mother to join them as well. When he learns that they will receive a badge for building a shelter, he as Doctor Doodlebug makes plans to get it by creating the Pack-A-Doodle, a robotic backpack that can do anything for him. The day goes well. In the morning the Pack-A-Doodle gets wet and starts attacking everyone. Kit suits up as the Rocketeer and rescues the other campers and traps Pack-A-Doodle. Rolland comes clean about his invention, but becomes humbled by his experience and promises to get the badge the right way. Song: "Pack-a-Doodle-Do" sung by Dr. Doodlebug
18b	"Sitti's Visit"	Monica Tomova	Brian Hohlfeld	Derek Lee Thompson	July 11, 2020	TBA	N/A
Hughesville is hosting a cooking event and Kit is happy as her grandma Sitti is coming to visit. After saving her train by moving the Cast-Iron Chef's truck out the way, she becomes determined to stop whatever scheme he has. Cast-Iron Chef tries to steal their cook book, but ends up stealing a shopping list and accidentally creates havoc, forcing Kit to save him. As he denounces cooking, Sitti gives him a stern talking to and he reveals that he never had a cook book of his own because he never got to cook with his father. He recalls one recipe and makes it and Kit gives him a book to write new recipes.
19a	"The Haunted House"	Carin-Anne Anderson	Brian Hohlfeld	Kate Brusk	July 16, 2020	TBA	N/A
Tesh is afraid to enter a haunted house, but Kit convinces him otherwise. Unbeknownst to either of them, The Great Orsino and Deany are running the haunted house to earn money. As they close up for the night, Eddie the hamster runs in forcing Kit and Tesh to go back in. The Great Orsino sees the Rocketeer and they decide to use Eddie as bait to get the jetpack once again. Kit manages to evade them and she, Tesh, and Butch put together their own scary tricks to scare The Great Orsino and Deany away. They finally manage to get Eddie back after he pulls a trick that manages to scare Kit a little.
19b	"The Halloween Heist"	Paul Demeyer	Kendall Michele Haney	Rudi Berden	July 16, 2020	TBA	N/A
It is Halloween and Kit and Tesh need to wait for a shipment of costumes to arrive. Sylvester tries to rob the Bulldog Café, but Kit spots him as he has been dressed as a cowboy all week. Lilith tells him of the shipment and they plot to steal them. They create a stampede of cows and Kit as the Rocketeer, Tesh and Butch are forced to round them up. They get word from Officer Crowfoot about the theft at the airfield and they manage to arrive just in time to stop Sylvester and Lilith from taking off. Afterwards, Kit and Tesh dress as a pilot and cow, respectively, and spend the night enjoying the festivities. Song: "Halloween Round-Up" performed by Beau Black
20	"The Christmas Star"	Carin-Anne Anderson and Paul Demeyer	Brian Hohlfeld	Ray Smyth and Arthur Valencia	July 17, 2020	TBA	N/A
It is Christmas and everyone is in the spirit of giving. Sylvester is disappointed that he never got any gifts as a child. When he learns that the Hughesville Santa Claus is due to hand gifts out to everyone, he resolves to steal them for himself. He steals the bag, but not before Richard takes a photo of him. When Ambrose, who was portraying the actual Hughesville Santa, learns that the gifts are gone, Kit suits up as the Rocketeer and chases after Sylvester to the airfield. Ambrose manages to hop aboard the plane and Sylvester and Lilith fall out. Ambrose tries to bring the gifts back, but all the children simply want Ambrose to be safe and he drops the gifts. Sylvester and Lilith find the bag, but are moved by a child and decide to return them. Kit leads Ambrose back to Hughesville as everyone gathers to celebrate Christmas together. Songs: "It's That Time of Year" / "Look for the Light" sung by Hughesville citizens
21a	"Scarlett's Search"	Monica Tomova	Kendall Michele Haney	Katya Bowser	July 18, 2020	TBA	N/A
Kit's Aunt Scarlett returns to Hughesville to continue her search for Great-Grandpa Cliff's old airplane which disappeared during a run. With her parents' permission, Kit joins Scarlett to Narrows Canyon which they deduce had its strong gale winds carry the plane through a waterfall. As they trek down the canyon, Kit becomes the Rocketeer and carries Scarlett through the waterfall. Scarlett learns that Kit is the Rocketeer, but she keeps it a secret. They find the plane and successfully fly it out of the waterfall and back to the airfield. Scarlett tells Kit that she will inherit the plane. Song: "Keep on Trying" performed by Tammy Infusino
21b	"Rocketeer Day"	Carin-Anne Anderson	Kristofer Wellman	Ray Smyth	July 18, 2020	TBA	N/A
It is Rocketeer Day as everyone recalls how the original Rocketeer saved Hughesville and left behind a gold pocket watch. Sylvester and Lilith decide to steal it by posing as the original Rocketeer, named "Chick Barnes", and his cat. Ambrose knows something is off and Richard tells Kit that the cat is a ferret. Knowing full well who it is, Kit as the Rocketeer outs Sylvester and chases him on a blimp before rescuing him from crashing it. Ambrose gets the pocket watch and opens it to find a childhood drawing from his youth. They realize that the original Rocketeer was Cliff Secord, explaining why Kit got the jetpack on her birthday.
22	"Heart of a Hero"	Carin-Anne Anderson (part 1) Monica Tomova (part 2)	Nicole Dubuc (part 1) Greg Johnson (part 2)	Jake Kim (part 1) Derek Lee Thompson (part 2)	July 25, 2020	TBA	0.17
Kit meets Norman Sinclair, the heir to Sinclair Air who is also a huge fan of the Rocketeer and openly wants to have her jetpack so that he can be the Rocketeer as well. He feigns an issue with his plane the AVA and Kit responds, but ends up losing her jetpack to Norman who ends up being a lousy superhero. As Kit and Tesh ride through Hughesville, Slyvester Slapdash and Doctor Doodlebug as well as Valkyrie openly miss the original Rocketeer. With no other choice, Kit, Tesh and Butch team up with Sylvester and Lilith, Valkyrie, and Doctor Doodlebug to retrieve the jetpack from Norman's house. They manage to get it back and Kit as the Rocketeer flies off with Norman in pursuit. He admits that he wanted to show his father that he can be a hero and Kit ends up saving him when his plane runs out of fuel. Kit thanks the villains and Valkyrie before flying away victoriously. Song: "Villains' Lament" sung by Sylvester Slapdash, Dr. Doodlebug and Valerie

== Broadcast ==
The Rocketeer premiered on Disney Junior, Disney Channel, and DisneyNOW on November 8, 2019. The series debuted internationally on Canada's Disney Junior on November 10, 2019. It debuted in Latin America on April 6, 2020, and in Spain, it was previewed on July 20, 2020, and it officially premiered on September 28, 2020. The Rocketeer debuted on Disney+ in the United Kingdom in October 2020. The series aired on Southeast Asia's Disney Junior and France's Disney Junior in 2021. It was released on Southeast Asia's Disney Junior and France's Disney Junior in 2021. It premiered on Rai YoYo and Disney+ in Italy and on Dutch Disney Channel in the Netherlands in 2021.

The series ended on July 25, 2020. Following the final episode, the series went into hiatus, before unexpectedly getting cancelled. While no exact reason was said, a direct sequel to the film was announced for Disney+ the following year, hinting that the series' end was to make way for the new movie.

== Reception ==
=== Critical response ===
Merrill Barr of Forbes called The Rocketeer an "adorable" series, writing, "It's sweet, charming, aware of itself and filled to the brim with the kind of positive messaging every program of its type should be striving for. There will be no reason for any parent to not sit their child down in front of this one come premiere time." Emily Ashby of Common Sense Media gave The Rocketeer a grade of four out of five stars, praised the depiction of positive messages and role models, saying that the characters challenge gender stereotypes and that Kit is eager, determined, and fearless, saying, "Every story sees the hero learn a valuable lesson that is further illustrated as events play out, reinforcing positive themes."

=== Accolades ===
Year	Award	Category	Nominee(s)	Result	Ref.
2020	Daytime Emmy Awards	Outstanding Performer in a Preschool Animated Program	Maurice LaMarche	Nominated	
2020	Daytime Emmy Awards	Outstanding Sound Mixing for a Preschool Animated Program	Eric Lewis, Jay Culliton	Nominated	
2020	Daytime Emmy Awards	Outstanding Sound Editing for a Preschool Animated Program	Otis Van Osten, James Miller, Jason Oliver, Eric Lewis, Tommy Sarioglou	Nominated	
2020	Daytime Emmy Awards	Outstanding Writing for a Preschool Animated Program	Nicole Dubuc, Greg Johnson, Brian Hohlfeld, Kendall Michele Haney, Claudia Silver	Nominated	
2020	Daytime Emmy Awards	Outstanding Main Title for an Animated Program	Michael Daedalus Kenny	Nominated	
