= Beau Black =

American composer (born 1983)

- Born: August 5, 1983 (age 42); New York City, New York, U.S.
- Occupations: Composer, singer, musician, songwriter
- Years active: 1991–present
- Spouse: Alex Cartañá (m. 2011)
- Children: 1
- Father: Jay Black

External image
- Beau Black IMDb photo

Beau Black (born August 5, 1983) is an American composer, producer, musician, singer, songwriter, and instrumentalist from New York City, New York. He served as the primary songwriter for Disney's television show The Lion Guard, and received a Daytime Emmy Creative Arts nomination in 2017 in the category Outstanding Original Song for the Lion Guard song "Sisi Ni Sawa" (with Sarah Mirza, Ford Riley and Kevin Hopps) He received a 2nd Daytime Emmy Award in the category "Outstanding Original Song in a Children's, Young Adult or Animated Program" for "As You Move Forward" from The Lion Guard.

== Life and work ==
Beau Black is the son of Jay Black (lead singer of Jay and the Americans) and Andi Black. Black's first album of original music, Meant to Be, was released in 2008. Black has worked on shows including Miles from Tomorrowland, Penn Zero: Part Time Hero, The Lion Guard, Mickey and the Roadster Racers, Firebuds, TrollsTopia, Jake and the Neverland Pirates and The Rocketeer. He joined the creative team as a composer and songwriter for the Disney Junior production of the Mickey Mouse Funhouse Animated Series, which debuted in 2021.

He was nominated for a 2017 Daytime Emmy award for composing the song “Sisi Ni Sawa” from The Lion Guard, a series that he served as the primary songwriter for. In 2020, Black was named a nominee for the 47th Annual Daytime Emmy Award in the category "Outstanding Original Song in a Children's, Young Adult or Animated Program" for “As You Move Forward” from The Lion Guard.

== Selective discography ==
=== Studio albums ===
- Perfect Day (2014)
- Black & Bleu (with Bleu McAuley, 2013)
- Meant to Be (2008)

== Television ==
Year	Title	Network	Notes
2022–2025	Firebuds	Disney Junior	Songwriter
2021–2025	Mickey Mouse Funhouse	Disney Junior	Songwriter
2019–2020	The Rocketeer	Disney Junior	Songwriter
2017–2021	Mickey Mouse Mixed-Up Adventures	Disney Junior	Songwriter/Composer
2016–2019	The Lion Guard	Disney Junior	Songwriter
2015–2018	Miles from Tomorrowland	Disney Junior	"Way out", opening theme song in the first two seasons
2014–2017	Penn Zero: Part-Time Hero	Disney XD	Composed theme song with Ryan Shore
2013	Jake and the Neverland Pirates	Disney Junior	Songwriter of the episode "The Battle of Book"

== Personal life ==
In 2011, he married British-Spanish singer, songwriter and actress Alex Cartañá. Together they have one child, a daughter, who was born in May 2021.
