= Alex Cartañá =

British singer-songwriter (born 1983)

- Born: Alexandra Rosamund Cartañá-Marks; 7 April 1983 (age 43); Sussex, England
- Education: Ardingly College; University of Westminster; University of Greenwich
- Occupations: Singer-songwriter, actress
- Years active: 2003–present
- Spouse: Beau Black (m. 2011)
- Children: 1
- Relatives: Jay Black (father-in-law)
- Musical career
- Genres: Latin, Pop, Neo soul, World Music
- Label: EMI (2003–2005)
- Website: www.alexcartana.com

External image
- Alex Cartañá IMDb photo

Alex Cartañá (born Alexandra Rosamund Cartañá-Marks; 7 April 1983) is a British singer-songwriter and actress of Spanish descent. Cartañá first came to fame in 2003 as the featured artist and co-writer of the hit dance record, "Shake It (Move a Little Closer)", which peaked at No. 16 in the UK Singles Chart.

== Early years and influences ==
She was born to a British mother and Spanish father, and was raised on the island of Mallorca.

Cartañá spent her academic years between both English and Spanish educational systems, making her fully bilingual from a toddler. She is also able to speak Catalan.

Cartañá’s academic career began in a small farming, rurally-located British school in Mallorca – The Academy – English Preparatory School. At 11 years of age, she moved to a strict Spanish Catholic School in the centre of Palma – Colegio San Cayetano. By the age of 17 she had convinced her parents to transfer her into the British schooling system, this time attending Ardingly College, a British Boarding school in West Sussex, so she could study Performing Arts. It would be here that Cartañá would start developing her performance skills through theatre studies, speech and drama lessons, and an acting course with LAMDA, as well as forming the school's first gospel choir who, in their spare time, practiced songs such as Whitney Houston's version of "Jesus Loves Me" and mimicking En Vogue's "Does Anybody Hear Me".

Her father's love for world music, including Spanish flamenco and Brazilian bossa nova, would instill a tropical and exotic feel to her music. A Spanish pop and American popular music influence also could be heard during her early years. Later on she would be captivated by mainstream R&B and hip hop, which, in her own words, has been described as "my childhood deprivation, which I had been longing to hear all my life! The missing part of the puzzle!" Her influences have included Gloria Estefan, Mariah Carey, Whitney Houston, Michael Jackson, Madonna, Toni Braxton, Boyz II Men, Stevie Wonder, Cece Winans, Nat King Cole, Mary Wells, her mother's all-time-favourite Marvin Gaye, Aretha Franklin, Randy Crawford, Roberta Flack, Gladys Knight & the Pips, Diana Ross & The Supremes, Alejandro Sanz, Rosario Flores, Mary J. Blige, and many more.

Cartañá attended the University of Greenwich in her first year of her BA Business Studies and E-Commerce degree, but would move to the University of Westminster in her second year, after achieving first-class grades. It was during her time there that she would first enter the music business by working in her sandwich year for a London-based management company, JBS Management & Hardzone Marketing. Whilst working as a club promoter for Def Jam Records and Death Row Records, as well as marketing various British musicians, Cartañá came into contact with Big Brovaz and first struck a friendship with Dino McIntosh. Another songwriter Cartañá would become friends with was Ali Tennant, known for writing hits for Westlife, Boyzone and Blue. Tennant assisted Cartañá in making her first demo. Cartañá returned to complete her fourth and final year at the University of Westminster and graduated in the fall of 2002.

== Career ==
=== "Shake It (Move a Little Closer)" ===
In mid-2003, only months after signing with EMI, the opportunity of co-writing and featuring on an already instrumental dance track arose. She co-wrote and performed on "Shake It (Move a Little Closer)" by Lee-Cabrera (the New York production duo of Steven Lee and Albert Cabrera, erstwhile collaborators with Aretha Franklin, Brian McKnight and Tori Amos) for Credence/EMI UK, and supported by the BBC Radio 1 DJ Pete Tong. Cartañá flew to Malaga to shoot a video and perform in front of fans at the Radio 1 Road Show in Ibiza. The single, released on 26 August 2003, reached No. 16 in the UK Singles Chart. Her friendship with Albert Cabrera would lead the way for a second collaboration a few years later.

=== The EMI years ===
Her first solo single released under the EMI label was in April 2004 with "Hey Papi". The title and introduction showcased her Spanish heritage, and the sentiment of the song was inspired by the relationship between Cartañá and her father, whom, after the death of her elder sister, became over-protective. "Hey Papi" peaked at No. 34 in the UK chart. The video was directed by American director Charles Mehling, also known for directing James Morrison's "One Last Chance" video. This would be her last piece of music to be released under the EMI label, as difficulties in decision-making towards her second single would start to take artist and label as well as her then management in different directions, also triggering uncertainty amongst all of those involved. An amicable decision was finally made in 2005, to allow Cartañá to walk away from her deal after almost eight months of deliberation. Two months after this major transition, Cartañá also left her management team.

During this time, Cartañá featured on the Roll Deep song, "Be Careful", featured on their In at the Deep End album .

In October 2004, a third song from Cartañá, "Lost Your Mind", was due for release, however the song was cancelled two weeks prior to the due date. This would be her last piece of music to be released under the EMI label, as difficulties in decision-making towards her second solo single, would start to take artist and label, as well as her then management in different directions, also triggering uncertainty amongst all of those involved.

=== 2006–2009 ===
In 2006, Cartañá teamed up with Paul Smith, a member of 365 Artists Management Company.

Dance projects such "Dig the Vibes" with Cabrera was released through Kidology Records, and a second dance track and co-writer credits was "Funkmanouver", commercially known as "Wait for Me", featured on the Ministry of Sound compilation album, Housexy: Summer in the City, released in March 2007.

Cartañá was working on new material independently and working towards a full Spanish album which was to be sprinkled with all her past influences. But that album came to a halt and never fully materialized. And she consequently decided to focus her attention on other ventures.

=== 2015–present ===
In 2015, Cartañá became involved with Disney Junior's animated series The Lion Guard, based on Disney's 1994 film The Lion King. She sings backing vocals on all of the songs on the show, including lead vocals for the song "Trail to Hope". She also voices the character Twiga the giraffe, whose first appearance was singing the lead vocals for the song "Kupatana Community".

Cartaña voices the character of Assistant Matron in Earwig and the Witch.

== Discography ==
=== Singles ===
- 2003: "Shake It (Move a little Closer)" – US (Hot Dance Music/Club Play) No. 9, US (R&B) No. 83, UK No. 16
- 2004: "Hey Papi" – UK No. 34
- 2004: "Lost Your Mind"

== Personal life ==
In 2011, she married American singer, composer and musician Beau Black. Together they have one child, a daughter, who was born in May 2021.
