= Macedonia in the Eurovision Song Contest 2017 =

- Eurovision Song Contest 2017
- Country: Macedonia
- Selection process: Internal selection
- Announcement date: Artist: 21 November 2016; Song: 10 March 2017

Competing entry
- Song: "Dance Alone"
- Artist: Jana Burčeska
- Songwriters: Borislav Milanov; Alex Omar; Joacim Persson; Florence A.

Placement
- Semi-final result: Failed to qualify (15th)

Participation chronology

Macedonia (Note: Officially under the provisional appellation "former Yugoslav Republic of Macedonia", abbreviated "FYR Macedonia".) was represented at the Eurovision Song Contest 2017 with the song "Dance Alone" written by Borislav Milanov, Alex Omar, Joacim Persson and Florence A. The song was performed by Jana Burčeska, who was internally selected by the Macedonian broadcaster Macedonian Radio Television (MRT) to compete for Macedonia at the 2017 contest in Kyiv, Ukraine. Jana Burčeska's appointment as the Macedonian representative was announced on 21 November 2016, while her song, "Dance Alone", was presented to the public during the MRT programme Stisni Plej on 10 March 2017.

Macedonia was drawn to compete in the second semi-final of the Eurovision Song Contest which took place on 11 May 2017. Performing during the show in position 3, "Dance Alone" was not announced among the top 10 entries of the second semi-final and therefore did not qualify to compete in the final. It was later revealed that Macedonia placed fifteenth out of the 18 participating countries in the semi-final with 69 points.

== Background ==
Prior to the 2017 contest, Macedonia had participated in the Eurovision Song Contest sixteen times since its first entry in 1998. The nation's best result in the contest to this point was twelfth, which it achieved in 2006 with the song "Ninanajna" performed by Elena Risteska. Following the introduction of semi-finals for the 2004, Macedonia had featured in only five finals.

The Macedonian national broadcaster, Macedonian Radio Television (MRT), broadcasts the event within Macedonia and organises the selection process for the nation's entry. Macedonia had previously selected their entry for the Eurovision Song Contest through both national finals and internal selections. MRT confirmed their intentions to participate at the 2017 Eurovision Song Contest on 19 September 2016. Between 2008 and 2011, Macedonia selected their entries using the national final Skopje Fest. During this period, the nation failed to qualify to the final on every occasion. Between 2012 and 2014, the broadcaster internally selected Macedonia's entry, resulting in a single qualification to the final during this period in 2012. After failing to qualify in 2015 where Skopje Fest was used as a national final, the broadcaster internally selected Kaliopi to represent the nation in 2016 but failed to bring the country to the final with the song "Dona". For 2017, the broadcaster again opted to internally select the Macedonian entry.

== Before Eurovision ==
=== Internal selection ===
On 21 November 2016, MRT announced that they had internally selected Jana Burčeska to represent Macedonia in Kyiv. Burčeska previously competed in the first season of the reality talent show Macedonian Idol where she placed fifth. In regards to her selection as the Macedonian entrant, Burčeska stated: "I would like to infinitely thank the National Broadcaster for investing their trust and choosing me to represent our country in the upcoming Eurovision Song Contest. I am grateful and really appreciate the opportunity I’ve been given, but am also aware of the responsibilities I must bear. My heart skipped a beat when I was told the good news and I have kept on smiling ever since." A submission period was opened on 2 December 2016 for interested composers to submit their songs that are "modern and attractive" until 25 December 2016. MRT received over 200 submissions at the closing of the deadline.

On 10 March 2017, it was announced that Jana Burčeska would perform the song "Dance Alone" at the Eurovision Song Contest 2017. "Dance Alone" was presented to the public later on the same day along with the official music video, developed and directed by Sergey Zhelezko from the Nu Boyana Film Studios in Sofia, during the MRT 1 programme Stisni Plej. The song was written and composed by members of the songwriting team Symphonix International: Borislav Milanov, Alex Omar, Joacim Persson and Florence A.

=== Promotion ===
Jana Burčeska made several appearances across Europe to specifically promote "Dance Alone" as the Macedonian Eurovision entry. On 2 April, Burčeska performed during the London Eurovision Party, which was held at the Café de Paris venue in London, United Kingdom and hosted by Nicki French and Paddy O'Connell. Between 3 and 6 April, Burčeska took part in promotional activities in Tel Aviv, Israel and performed during the Israel Calling event held at the Ha'teatron venue. On 14 April, Burčeska performed during the Eurovision in Concert event which was held at the Melkweg venue in Amsterdam, Netherlands and hosted by Cornald Maas and Selma Björnsdóttir.

== At Eurovision ==
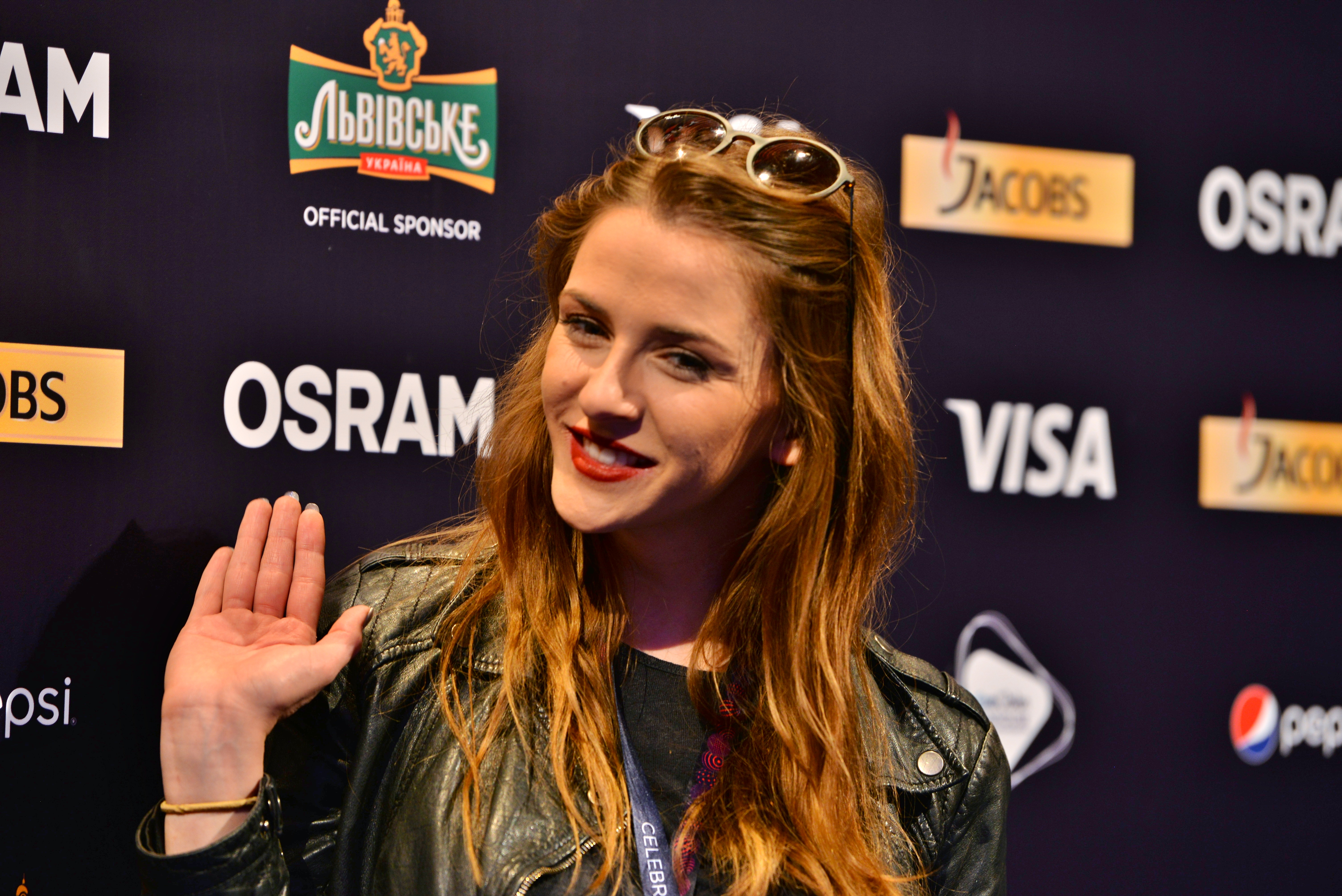
Jana Burčeska during a press meet and greet

According to Eurovision rules, all nations with the exceptions of the host country and the "Big Five" (France, Germany, Italy, Spain and the United Kingdom) are required to qualify from one of two semi-finals in order to compete for the final; the top ten countries from each semi-final progress to the final. The European Broadcasting Union (EBU) split up the competing countries into six different pots based on voting patterns from previous contests, with countries with favourable voting histories put into the same pot. On 31 January 2017, a special allocation draw was held which placed each country into one of the two semi-finals, as well as which half of the show they would perform in. Macedonia was placed into the second semi-final, held on 11 May 2017, and was scheduled to perform in the first half of the show.

Once all the competing songs for the 2017 contest had been released, the running order for the semi-finals was decided by the shows' producers rather than through another draw, so that similar songs were not placed next to each other. Macedonia was set to perform in position 3, following the entry from Austria and before the entry from Malta.

The two semi-finals and final were broadcast in Macedonia on MRT 1 with commentary by Karolina Petkovska. The Macedonian spokesperson, who announced the top 12-point score awarded by the Macedonian jury during the final, was Ilija Grujoski.

=== Semi-final ===
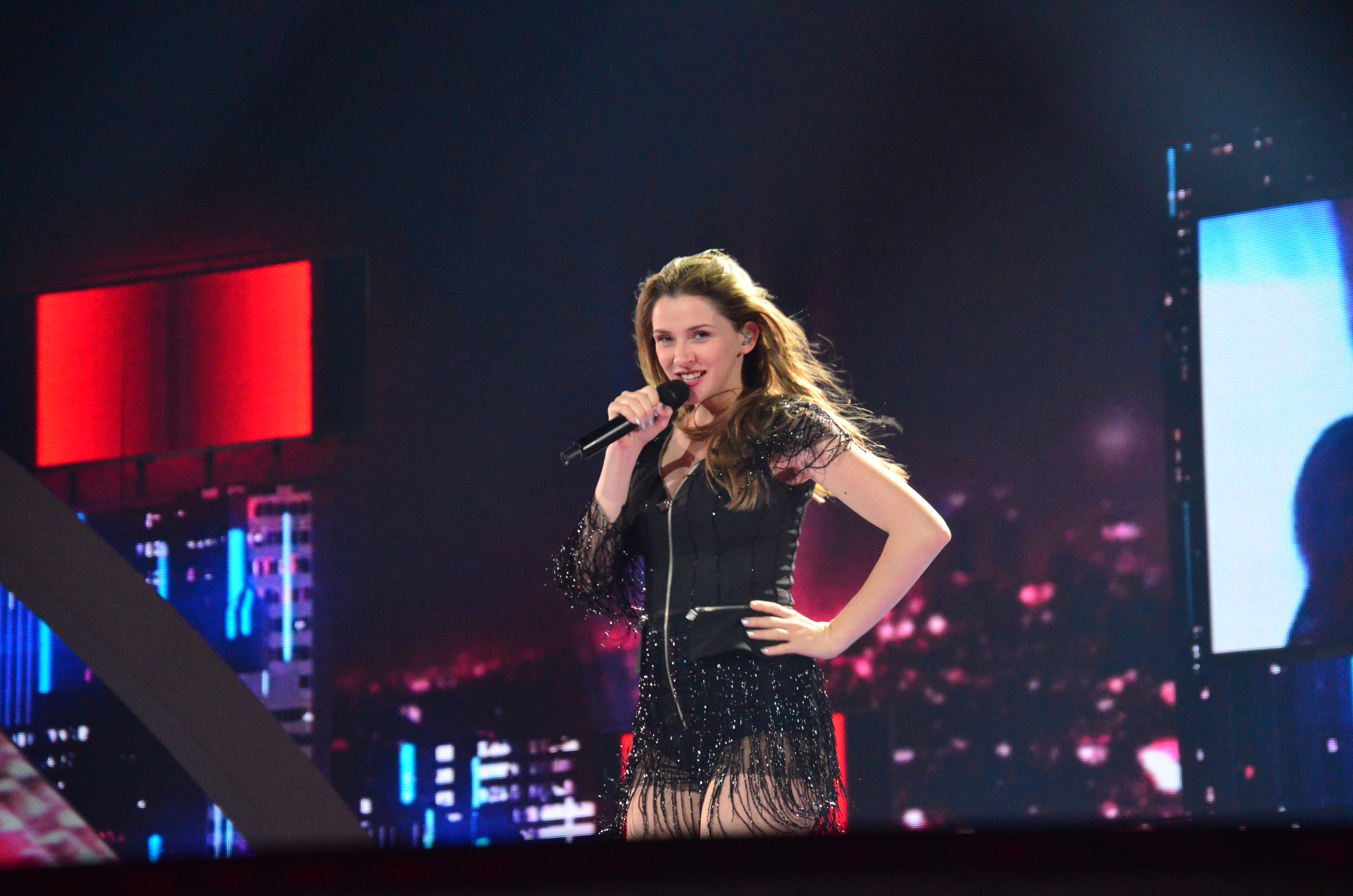
Jana Burčeska during a rehearsal before the second semi-final

Jana Burčeska took part in technical rehearsals on 2 and 5 May, followed by dress rehearsals on 10 and 11 May. This included the jury show on 10 May where the professional juries of each country watched and voted on the competing entries.

The Macedonian performance featured Jana Burčeska performing a dance routine alone on stage in a short black glittery dress with tassels. The stage colours were predominately red with the background LED screens displaying a skyline with three video billboards that showed images from the music video of the song. The artistic director for the Macedonian performance was Ambra Succi. Jana Burčeska was also joined by four off-stage backing vocalists: Katya Krusteva, Krustina Kokorska, Milena Tzanova and Valentina Dimitrova.

At the end of the show, Macedonia was not announced among the top 10 entries in the second semi-final and therefore failed to qualify to compete in the final. It was later revealed that Macedonia placed fifteenth in the semi-final, receiving a total of 69 points: 40 points from the televoting and 29 points from the juries.

=== Voting ===
Voting during the three shows involved each country awarding two sets of points from 1-8, 10 and 12: one from their professional jury and the other from televoting. Each nation's jury consisted of five music industry professionals who are citizens of the country they represent, with their names published before the contest to ensure transparency. This jury judged each entry based on: vocal capacity; the stage performance; the song's composition and originality; and the overall impression by the act. In addition, no member of a national jury was permitted to be related in any way to any of the competing acts in such a way that they cannot vote impartially and independently. The individual rankings of each jury member as well as the nation's televoting results were released shortly after the grand final.

Below is a breakdown of points awarded to Macedonia and awarded by Macedonia in the second semi-final and grand final of the contest, and the breakdown of the jury voting and televoting conducted during the two shows:

==== Points awarded to Macedonia ====
Points awarded to Macedonia (Semi-final 2)
Score	Televote	Jury
12 points	Bulgaria	
10 points	Serbia	
8 points		France; Malta
7 points		
6 points	Croatia	
5 points	Israel	Serbia
4 points	San Marino	
3 points	Switzerland	Norway; Ukraine
2 points		Hungary
1 point		

==== Points awarded by Macedonia ====
Points awarded by Macedonia (Semi-final 2)
Score	Televote	Jury
12 points	Serbia	Bulgaria
10 points	Bulgaria	Romania
8 points	Croatia	Malta
7 points	Israel	Denmark
6 points	Hungary	Netherlands
5 points	Switzerland	Hungary
4 points	Estonia	Lithuania
3 points	Romania	Austria
2 points	Netherlands	Estonia
1 point	Ireland	Switzerland

Points awarded by Macedonia (Final)
Score	Televote	Jury
12 points	Bulgaria	Bulgaria
10 points	Croatia	Portugal
8 points	Italy	Australia
7 points	Portugal	Denmark
6 points	France	Moldova
5 points	Sweden	France
4 points	Belgium	Romania
3 points	Hungary	United Kingdom
2 points	Moldova	Norway
1 point	Israel	Sweden

==== Detailed voting results ====
The following members comprised the Macedonian jury:

- Aleksandar Masevski (Sasho Mase; jury chairperson) – composer, music producer
- Kalina Velkovska – singer
- Marko Mark – radio DJ
- Silvana Mučić Plevneš (Silvi) – singer
- Antonia Gigovska – singer

Detailed voting results from Macedonia (Semi-final 2)
R/O	Country	Jury							Televote	
R/O	Country	Sasho Mase	K. Velkovska	M. Mark	Silvi	A. Gigovska	Rank	Points	Rank	Points
01	Serbia	17	12	14	8	11	14		1	12
02	Austria	12	3	9	7	17	8	3	11	
03	Macedonia									
04	Malta	1	4	4	3	3	3	8	15	
05	Romania	2	5	2	2	2	2	10	8	3
06	Netherlands	5	10	5	4	6	5	6	9	2
07	Hungary	9	6	6	17	5	6	5	5	6
08	Denmark	4	2	3	5	4	4	7	12	
09	Ireland	10	16	7	15	7	11		10	1
10	San Marino	11	15	13	13	8	12		16	
11	Croatia	16	17	17	12	12	17		3	8
12	Norway	13	11	12	10	15	13		13	
13	Switzerland	8	13	11	6	16	10	1	6	5
14	Belarus	14	7	15	14	13	15		14	
15	Bulgaria	3	1	1	1	1	1	12	2	10
16	Lithuania	7	8	8	11	10	7	4	17	
17	Estonia	6	9	10	16	9	9	2	7	4
18	Israel	15	14	16	9	14	16		4	7

Detailed voting results from Macedonia (Final)
R/O	Country	Jury							Televote	
R/O	Country	Sasho Mase	K. Velkovska	M. Mark	Silvi	A. Gigovska	Rank	Points	Rank	Points
01	Israel	14	17	20	12	14	15		10	1
02	Poland	22	14	18	14	11	16		26	
03	Belarus	21	19	17	16	17	18		24	
04	Austria	11	8	7	11	19	11		23	
05	Armenia	20	18	12	13	12	14		22	
06	Netherlands	19	12	15	6	13	12		17	
07	Moldova	7	10	1	5	7	5	6	9	2
08	Hungary	23	11	23	22	26	23		8	3
09	Italy	15	20	19	20	24	21		3	8
10	Denmark	4	3	10	1	1	4	7	14	
11	Portugal	2	4	2	4	4	2	10	4	7
12	Azerbaijan	16	15	11	24	20	17		21	
13	Croatia	24	26	24	23	23	25		2	10
14	Australia	3	1	5	3	5	3	8	20	
15	Greece	26	25	25	21	25	26		12	
16	Spain	12	24	21	26	21	22		25	
17	Norway	10	13	4	10	10	9	2	19	
18	United Kingdom	9	7	14	7	9	8	3	15	
19	Cyprus	25	23	26	25	15	24		13	
20	Romania	8	6	8	9	6	7	4	11	
21	Germany	18	22	22	15	18	20		16	
22	Ukraine	17	21	16	18	22	19		18	
23	Belgium	13	16	6	17	16	13		7	4
24	Sweden	6	9	13	19	8	10	1	6	5
25	Bulgaria	1	2	3	2	2	1	12	1	12
26	France	5	5	9	8	3	6	5	5	6
