= Macedonian Idol season 1 =

Macedonian Idol
- Season 1

Release
- Original network: A1 TV
- Original release: 13 November 2010 – 30 May 2011

Macedonian Idol Season 1 (Macedonian: Македонски идол – Makedonski Idol) was the first and only season of the Macedonian version of the worldwide known talent franchise series Pop Idol. The show started airing on 13 November 2010 on A1 TV and finished airing on 30 May 2011 with the big final held in the Metropolis Arena, Skopje. The winner was Ivan Radenov from Gevgelija. As first runner-up finished Miki Sekulovski and second runner-up Dejan Jovanov.

The auditions started in the summer 2010. Ten Macedonian cities were included: Ohrid, Kavadarci, Strumica, Veles, Štip, Kumanovo, Skopje, Bitola, Tetovo and Prilep. Three famous Macedonian personalities were chosen to be the judges: Kaliopi Bukle (singer), Igor Džambazov (TV host, singer and actor) and Toni Mihajlovski (TV host and actor). Ivanna Hadžievska and Nenad Gjeorgjievski famous for being hosts of the show-magazine A1 Exclusive were the hosts of the show.

Twenty candidates were chosen for the final cut of the show. However, in the final concerts got only 13 candidates (finalists). The other seven were promised to record a song, which will be given as an award from the jury.

== Live shows ==
The concerts began airing on 7 March 2011 and in the semi-finals the finalists were divided on male and female. In the first and second semi-final, ten candidates got through to the final (5 males, 5 females). The producers organized another show, where the eliminated candidates of the previous two semi-finals competed. Three more contestants were chosen to sing in the final. The big concerts or the finals started with the Top 13 finalists. The shows are airing live every Monday in 20:00 (8:00 pm) CET (UTC+01:00). Every big concert has its theme.

=== Top 13 – Toše Proeski ===
28 March 2011

Order	Contestant	Song (Original Artist)	Result
1	Ivan Radenov	"Duša ostana" (Toše Proeski)	safe
2	Jana Burčeska	"Soba za taga" (Toše Proeski)	Bottom 3
3	Ivica Veloski	"Creša" (Toše Proeski)	safe
4	Katerina Simonovska	"Vo kosi da ti spijam" (Toše Proeski)	Eliminated
5	Dejan Jovanov	"Igri bez granici" (Toše Proeski)	Bottom 2
6	Emilija Gjorgjevska	"Srekjna li si ti?" (Toše Proeski)	safe
7	Viktor Apostolovski	"Bože, čuvaj ja od zlo" (Toše Proeski)	safe
8	Biljana Gjoševa	"Go molam nokjva neboto da te vrati" (Toše Proeski)	safe
9	Niko Gjorgjievski	"Po Tebe" (Toše Proeski)	safe
10	Julijana Jovanova	"Malečka" (Toše Proeski)	safe
11	Hristijan Todorovski	"Koj li ti grize obrazi" (Toše Proeski)	safe
12	Elizabeta Jovanovska	"Sonce vo tvoite rusi kosi" (Toše Proeski)	safe
13	Miki Sekulovski	"Zošto Otide?" (Toše Proeski)	safe

=== Top 12 – Macedonian Evergreens ===
4 April 2011

Order	Contestant	Song (Original Artist)	Result
1	Dejan Jovanov	"Crno tikveško" (Vlado Janevski)	safe
2	Biljana Gjoševa	"Letaj galebe" (Verica Risteska)	safe
3	Ivica Veloski	"Skitnik" (Jakov Drenkovski)	Bottom 3
4	Elizabeta Jovanovska	"Priznavam" (Marjana & Rosana)	Eliminated
5	Hristijan Todorovski	"223-305" (Dragan Mijalkovski)	Bottom 2
6	Emilija Gjorgjevska	"Ti si toj" (Lidija Kočovska)	safe
7	Niko Gjorgjievski	"Sonce za tri sveta" (Miki Jovanovski – Džafer)	safe
8	Julijana Jovanova	"Mnogu solzi" (Maja Odžaklievska)	safe
9	Viktor Apostolovski	"Osamen" (Trajče Manev)	safe
10	Jana Burčeska	"Li du du" (Maja Odžaklievska)	safe
11	Miki Sekulovski	"Kaži mi" (Dragan Mijalkovski)	safe
12	Ivan Radenov	"Moja gitara" (Sašo Gigov – Giš)	safe

=== Top 11 – Diva's Night ===
11 April 2011

Order	Contestant	Song (Original Artist)	Result
1	Ivica Veloski	"To Love Somebody" (Janis Joplin)	safe
2	Jana Burčeska	"Think" (Aretha Franklin)	safe
3	Dejan Jovanov	"The Best" (Tina Turner)	safe
4	Hristijan Todorovski	"Like a Prayer" (Madonna)	Bottom 2
5	Emilija Gjorgjevska	"Sober" (Pink)	Eliminated
6	Viktor Apostolovski	"Fighter" (Christina Aguilera)	Bottom 3
7	Ivan Radenov	"Chain of Fools" (Aretha Franklin)	safe
8	Biljana Gjoševa	"Saving All My Love for You" (Whitney Houston)	safe
9	Niko Gjorgjievski	"All by Myself" (Celine Dion)	safe
10	Miki Sekulovski	"Russian Roulette" (Rihanna)	safe
11	Julijana Jovanova	"Lady Marmalade" (Christina Aguilera, Lil' Kim, Mýa, and Pink)	safe

=== Top 10 – The Beatles ===
18 April 2011

Order	Contestant	Song (Original Artist)	Result
1	Ivan Radenov	"Oh! Darling" (The Beatles)	safe
2	Hristijan Todorovski	"Don't Let Me Down" (The Beatles)	Bottom 3
3	Jana Burčeska	"I Saw Her Standing There" (The Beatles)	safe
4	Ivica Veloski	"Yesterday" (The Beatles)	safe
5	Dejan Jovanov	"Drive My Car" (The Beatles)	safe
6	Julijana Jovanova	"Help!" (The Beatles)	Eliminated
7	Viktor Apostolovski	"Eleanor Rigby" (The Beatles)	safe
8	Niko Gjorgjievski	"While My Guitar Gently Weeps" (The Beatles)	safe
9	Biljana Gjoševa	"Get Back" (The Beatles)	Bottom 2
10	Miki Sekulovski	"Let It Be" (The Beatles)	safe

=== Top 9 – Ex-Yu Hits ===
25 April 2011

Order	Contestant	Song (Original Artist)	Result
1	Niko Gjorgjievski	"Molitva" (Marija Šerifović)	Eliminated
2	Dejan Jovanov	"Libar" (Gibonni)	safe
3	Jana Burčeska	"Dodirni mi kolena" (Zana)	safe
4	Ivan Radenov	"Bacila je sve niz rijeku" (Indexi)	safe
5	Ivica Veloski	"Ako ima Boga" (Bijelo dugme)	Eliminated
6	Biljana Gjoševa	"Budi dobar kao što sam ja" (Maja Odžaklievska)	safe
7	Miki Sekulovski	"Sve još miriše na nju" (Parni Valjak)	safe
8	Hristijan Todorovski	"Zašto praviš slona od mene?" (Dino Dvornik)	Bottom 3
9	Viktor Apostolovski	"Ti si mi u krvi" (Zdravko Čolić)	safe

=== Top 7 – Pop Hits ===
2 May 2011

Order	Contestant	Song (Original Artist)	Result
1	Dejan Jovanov	"Kiss" (Prince and The Revolution)	safe
2	Miki Sekulovski	"Let Me Entertain You" (Robbie Williams)	safe
3	Biljana Gjoševa	"Everytime" (Britney Spears)	Bottom 2
4	Hristijan Todorovski	"You Are Not Alone" (Michael Jackson)	Eliminated
5	Viktor Apostolovski	"Grenade" (Bruno Mars)	safe
6	Jana Burčeska	"Man! I Feel Like a Woman!" (Shania Twain)	Bottom 3
7	Ivan Radenov	"I Want to Break Free" (Queen)	safe

=== Top 6 – Staff's choice: Macedonian pop songs & English duets ===
9 May 2011

Order	Contestant	Song (Original Artist)	Result
1	Jana Burčeska	"Nemirna" (Tamara Todevska)	Bottom 3
2	Dejan Jovanov	"Po navika" (Non stop)	Bottom 2
3	Miki Sekulovski	"Ako ne te sakam" (Vlado Janevski)	safe
4	Biljana Gjoševa	"Slatka gorchina" (Karolina Gočeva)	Eliminated
5	Ivan Radenov	"Lebedot bel" (Nokaut)	safe
6	Viktor Apostolovski	"Sonce ne me gree" (Vlatko Lozanoski)	safe
7	Biljana Gjoševa & Dejan Jovanov	"It's Only Love" (Bryan Adams & Tina Turner)	
8	Ivan Radenov & Jana Burčeska	"You're the One That I Want" (John Travolta & Olivia Newton-John)	
9	Viktor Apostolovski & Miki Sekulovski	"Don't Let the Sun Go Down on Me" (George Michael & Elton John)	

=== Top 5 – Rock music ===
16 May 2011

Order	Contestant	Song (Original Artist)	Result
1	Miki Sekulovski	"Bed of Roses" (Bon Jovi)	safe
2	Ivan Radenov	"Is This Love" (Whitesnake)	safe
3	Jana Burčeska	"Aerials" (System of a Down)	Eliminated
4	Viktor Apostolovski	"I Don't Want to Miss a Thing" (Aerosmith)	Bottom 2
5	Dejan Jovanov	"Soldier of Fortune" (Deep Purple)	safe
6	Miki Sekulovski	"Smells Like Teen Spirit" (Nirvana)	safe
7	Ivan Radenov	"Resistance" (Muse)	safe
8	Jana Burčeska	"Call Me" (Blondie)	Eliminated
9	Viktor Apostolovski	"Numb" (Linkin Park)	Bottom 2
10	Dejan Jovanov	"In the Shadows" (The Rasmus)	safe

=== Top 4 – Best from the artist ===
23 May 2011

Order	Contestant	Song (Original Artist)	Result
1	Viktor Apostolovski	"Whataya Want from Me" (Adam Lambert)	Eliminated
2	Miki Sekulovski	"Right Here Waiting" (Richard Marx)	safe
3	Dejan Jovanov	"My Way" (Frank Sinatra)	Bottom 2
4	Ivan Radenov	"Sunday Morning" (Maroon 5)	safe
5	Viktor Apostolovski	"Maria Maria" (Carlos Santana feat. The Product G&B)	Eliminated
6	Miki Sekulovski	"Freedom" (George Michael)	safe
7	Dejan Jovanov	"Fly Away" (Lenny Kravitz)	Bottom 2
8	Ivan Radenov	"Missing" (Everything but the Girl)	safe

=== Top 3 – Macedonian folk music, Dance hits (Judges' choice), Contestant's choice ===
30 May 2011

Order	Contestant	Song (Original Artist)	Result
1	Ivan Radenov	"Si zaljubiv edno mome" (Leb i Sol & Dado Topić version)	Winner
2	Miki Sekulovski	"Jano Mori"	Runner-up
3	Dejan Jovanov	"Dejgidi ludi godini"	Eliminated
4	Ivan Radenov	"What a Feeling" (Flashdance)	Winner
5	Miki Sekulovski	"Holding Out for a Hero" (Bonnie Tyler)	Runner-up
6	Dejan Jovanov	"(I've Had) The Time of My Life" (Dirty Dancing)	Eliminated
7	Ivan Radenov	"Love Ain't No Stranger" (Whitesnake)	Winner
8	Miki Sekulovski	"Hello" (Lionel Richie)	Runner-up

== Elimination table ==
Legend
Did Not Perform	Female	Male	Top 20	Wild Card	Top 13	Winner

Safe	Safe First	Safe Last	Eliminated

Stage:		Semi		Wild; Card	Finals									
Week:		3/07	3/14	3/21	3/28	4/04	4/11	4/18	4/25	5/02	5/09	5/16	5/23	5/30
Place	Contestant	Result												
1	Ivan Radenov	Top 13												Winner
2	Miki Sekulovski	Top 13												Runner-up
3	Dejan Jovanov	Top 13			Btm 2						Btm 2		Btm 2	Elim
4	Viktor Apostolovski	Elim		Top 13			Btm 3					Btm 2	Elim	
5	Jana Burčeska		Top 13		Btm 3					Btm 3	Btm 3	Elim		
6	Biljana Gjoševa		Elim	Top 13				Btm 2		Btm 2	Elim			
7	Hristijan Todoroski	Top 13				Btm 2	Btm 2	Btm 3	Btm 3	Elim				
8-9	Ivica Veloski	Top 13				Btm 3			Elim					
8-9	Niko Gjorgjievski	Elim		Top 13					Elim					
10	Julijana Jovanova		Top 13					Elim						
11	Emilija Gjorgevska		Top 13				Elim							
12	Elizabeta Jovanovska		Top 13			Elim								
13	Katerina Simonovska		Top 13		Elim									
Semi	Aleksandra Mihova		Elim	Elim										
Semi	Anita Micova		Elim	Elim										
Semi	Denis Murat	Elim		Elim										
Semi	Ivo Dimitrov	Elim		Elim										
Semi	Laura Kërliu		Elim	Elim										
Semi	Natalija Danailova		Elim	Elim										
Semi	Vlatko Iljačev	Elim		Elim										

== See also ==
- Macedonian Idol
- Idol Serbia-Montenegro & Macedonia
- Pop Idol
- Macedonian music
