= A1 Televizija =

Macedonian television network

A1 TV
- Country: North Macedonia
- Broadcast area: North Macedonia
- Affiliates: A2
- Headquarters: Pero Nakov BB Skopje, North Macedonia

Programming
- Language: Macedonian
- Picture format: 4:3 (576i, SDTV)

Ownership
- Owner: Velija Ramkovski
- Sister channels: A2 TV

History
- Launched: 22 January 1993; TBA (relaunch)
- Closed: 31 July 2011

A1 Televizija (Macedonian: А1 телевизија) or just A1 was a television channel in North Macedonia. The second privately owned commercial television station in the country (after TEKO TV), it broadcast from 22 January 1993 to 31 July 2011.

== History ==
A1 Television was founded on 22 January 1993, as the first private and independent TV station in Macedonia. The number of employees at its peak was approximately 200 (managing and editorial board, journalists, reporters, presenters, technical staff, marketing, administration) and a large number of correspondents and external cooperators. A1 TV broadcast content in a wide variety of genres including Information, Culture, Arts, Documentaries, Entertainment, Sports and Children's. The main element was the Informative program – central news bulletins at 19:00 and 23:00, short news at 16:00, round tables, interviews and dialogues.

The station's flagship news bulletin was under the banner A1 Vesti A1 News with the central bulletin at 7 pm. It was presented by Tatjana Stojanovska.

According to most television polls, A1 TV dominated as the most watched TV Broadcaster in North Macedonia, even more watched than the public broadcaster Macedonian Radio Television. In February 2001, A1 TV was the first television station that broke the news about the 2001 Macedonian conflict, when its journalist Snežana Lupevska and the television crew, who were intending to do a report about the life in that area, were kidnapped by the armed ethnic Albanian guerrilla gunmen in the Macedonian village of Tanuševci, on the Macedonia-Kosovo border.

On 2 July 2008, A1 launched its second TV channel called A2. A2 aired older TV-Serials that have previously been broadcast on A1 and brand new content including TV serials, movies and cartoons.

The station's facilities were raided by the police on 25 November 2010. All of its journalists and camera operators were forbidden from working.

On 31 July 2011, it was announced that the station has been dissolved following a bankruptcy proceeding due to accumulated debt of over €30 million. The station's owner Velija Ramkovski along with part of the management spent time in detention over the issue for a few months. Velija Ramkovski was then taken to jail by the Macedonian police and has been in jail since.

== Programmes ==
=== Nationally created and broadcast shows by A1 TV ===
| Original name | Format | Origin |
|---|---|---|
| A1 Vesti | News | Macedonia |
| A1 Meteo | Weather Program | Macedonia |
| Macedonian Idol | Talent Show | Macedonia |
| 4 Sezoni | Cooking Show | Macedonia |
| A1 Exclusive | Gossip Show | Macedonia |
| Bravo show | Music Show | Macedonia |
| Rano den | Morning Program | Macedonia |
| Farmer | Farm Show | Macedonia |
| Index | Economy Show | Macedonia |
| Bebe magazin | Baby Show | Macedonia |
| Evrozum | Political Show | Macedonia |
| Hodnici | Health Show | Macedonia |

=== Series ===
- 24
- According to Jim
- Charmed
- Chris Colorado
- Commesse 2
- CSI: Crime Scene Investigation
- CSI: Miami
- CSI: NY
- Desperate Housewives
- Dirty Sexy Money
- Edgemont
- Fifi and the Flowertots
- Friends
- Grey's Anatomy
- Hannah Montana
- Incantesimo
- Inspector Rex
- Judging Amy
- Justice
- Johnny Test
- Little Einsteins
- Los Serrano
- Lost
- Lud, Zbunjen, Normalan
- Mad About You
- Mickey Mouse Clubhouse
- Naruto
- Nash Bridges
- Nightmares & Dreamscapes: From the Stories of Stephen King
- Nip/Tuck
- Pokémon
- Sleeper Cell
- Smurfs
- South Park
- Spin City
- SpongeBob SquarePants
- Stargate
- The Nine
- The O.C
- The Sopranos
- Una Dona per Amico
- Viza za budućnost
- Vratice se rode
- Walker, Texas Ranger

=== Telenovelas ===
- Amar otra vez
- América
- Amarte así
- Antonella
- Casi ángeles
- Contra viento y marea
- Corazones al limite
- Cuando seas mía
- Dolina sunca
- El desprecio
- El juramento
- El manantial
- El privilegio de amar
- Entre el amor y el odio
- Estrambotica Anastasia
- Frecuencia 0.4
- Gitanas
- Hombres de honor
- Isa TKM
- Jelena
- Kachorra
- Laços de Família
- Las Vías del Amor
- Los Plateados
- Mi Prima Ciela
- Ne daj se, Nina
- Muneca Brava
- Nueve Lunas
- O Clone
- O Rei do Gado
- Pasión de Gavilanes
- Porto dos Milagros
- Rebelde Way
- Rubí
- Salomé
- Sve ce biti dobro
- Soledad
- Te Voy a Enseñar a Querer
- Zabranjena ljubav

=== Reality shows ===
- Operacija Trijumf
- Veliki brat
