= Jana Burčeska =

Macedonian singer (born 1993)

Jana Burčeska Јана Бурческа
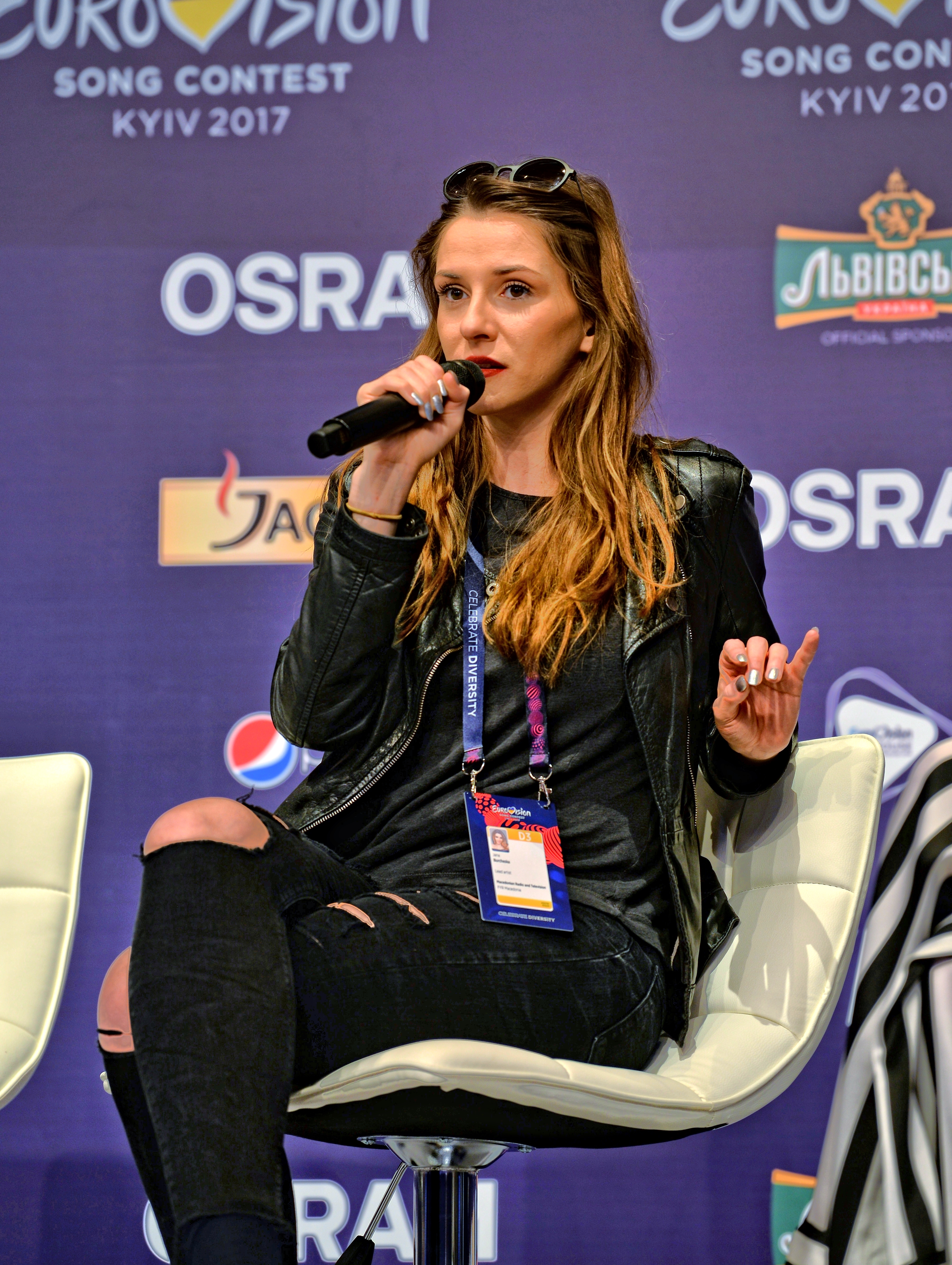
- Burčeska Meet&Greet press conference Eurovision Song Contest 2017 in Kyiv, Ukraine

Background information
- Born: 6 July 1993 (age 33); Skopje, Macedonia
- Genres: Pop; rock
- Occupation: Singer
- Years active: 2010–present
- Website: janaburcheska.mk

Jana Burčeska (Macedonian: Јана Бурческа, pronounced [ˈjana ˈburtʃɛska]; born 6 July 1993) is a Macedonian singer and TV presenter. She represented Macedonia in the Eurovision Song Contest 2017 in Ukraine, with the song "Dance Alone". Burčeska first came to prominence in her native country in 2011 after competing in Macedonian Idol.

She started hosting shows on Macedonian Radio Television (MRT) from 2018, notably hosting shows and later working on MRT's coverage of UEFA Euro 2020 as well as the Macedonian delegation for Eurovision Song Contest 2022.

== Biography ==
In 2011, Burčeska competed in Macedonian Idol and came fifth. On 21 November 2016, Macedonian Radio Television announced that the singer would represent Macedonia in the Eurovision Song Contest 2017, with the song "Dance Alone". She took part in the second semi-final of the contest on 11 May 2017, however failed to qualify to the final, placing 15th with 69 points.

In the Eurovision postcard aired before her performance, Burčeska announced her pregnancy. Later that evening, when interviewed on-air by host Timur Miroshnychenko, her boyfriend Alexander proposed to her and she accepted. The news made headlines worldwide with a few news outlets stating it "stole the show".

Burčeska gave birth to her first child, a baby girl named Dona, in October 2017.

From September 2018, she became a TV Presenter on Macedonian Radio Television. She hosted the show Stisni play. On August 2020, she gave birth to her second child, a baby boy named Darin.

Burčeska was a member of the Macedonian jury for the Eurovision Song Contest 2021, voting on the first semi-final. In June 2021, she hosted MRT's coverage of two matches on UEFA Euro 2020, namely Wales vs Switzerland on Group A, and the Group E match between Sweden and Slovakia.

She hosted the Macedonian national final for Eurovision Song Contest 2022 with Aleksandra Jovanovska. Later, she acted as a press assistant for the Macedonian delegation during the contest, as well as the jury voting spokesperson for North Macedonia in the contest's grand final.

== Discography ==
=== Singles ===
Title	Year	Peak chart positions	Album
Title	Year	MKD	Album
"Dance Alone"	2017	8	Non-album singles
"Home Alone"	2023	—	Non-album singles

Preceded by Kaliopi with "Dona"	Macedonia in the Eurovision Song Contest; 2017	Succeeded by Eye Cue with "Lost and Found"
