= List of Mickey Mouse Clubhouse episodes =

This is a full list of episodes from the Playhouse Disney/Disney Junior original series, Mickey Mouse Clubhouse.

== Series overview ==
Season	Episodes		Originally released		
Season	Episodes		First released	Last released	Network
Pilot			November 15, 2005		N/A
1	27		May 5, 2006	July 27, 2007	Playhouse Disney
2	40		January 26, 2008	February 20, 2010	Playhouse Disney
3	32	14	February 27, 2010	January 3, 2011	Playhouse Disney
3	32	18	February 14, 2011	September 28, 2012	Disney Junior
4	26		November 5, 2012	November 6, 2016	Disney Junior

== Episodes ==
=== Pilot (2005) ===
No.	Title	Original release date	Prod. code
Pilot	"Space Suit"	November 15, 2005	001
In the series' pilot episode, Mickey, Minnie, Donald, Goofy and Pluto pretend to be astronauts.

=== Season 1 (2006–07) ===
No. overall	No. in season	Title	Directed by	Written by	Original release date	Prod. code
1	1	"Daisy Bo-Peep"	Rob LaDuca	Bobs Gannaway & Leslie Valdes	May 5, 2006	101
Ten sheep Daisy was watching for Little Bo Peep go missing, and Mickey and his friends try to help her find them.
2	2	"A Surprise for Minnie"	Sherie Pollack	Leslie Valdes	May 6, 2006	102
Mickey and Donald forget it's Valentine's Day and he need help to make and deliver a Valentine’s Day card and a bow to their girlfriends Minnie and Daisy.
3	3	"Goofy's Bird"	Rob LaDuca	Story by : Bobs Gannaway & Leslie Valdes; Teleplay by : Leslie Valdes	May 7, 2006	103
Goofy's new "hat" is a nest with an egg. When a baby red bird hatches from it, Mickey and Goofy must bring him home to his mother in the forest.
4	4	"Donald's Big Balloon Race"	Sherie Pollack	Story by : Leslie Valdes; Teleplay by : Catherine Lieuwen	May 13, 2006	104
Mickey and Donald enter the Big Balloon Race. During the race, Mickey reminds Donald about being a good sport when Pete races them to win a blue ribbon.
5	5	"Donald and the Beanstalk"	Sherie Pollack	Story by : Leslie Valdes; Teleplay by : Catherine Lieuwen	May 20, 2006	105
Donald mistakenly trades his favorite pet, Boo-Boo Chicken to Willie the Giant, for five magic beans. But he misses his pet, so Mickey, Pluto and Goofy go with him up the beanstalk to get Boo-Boo Chicken without waking Willie the Giant up.
6	6	"Mickey Goes Fishing"	Rob LaDuca	Story by : Leslie Valdes; Teleplay by : Ashley Mendoza	May 20, 2006	106
Goofy has Mickey and Pluto take care of his cat, Mr. Pettibone by taking him to Star Lake to catch big red gooey fish.
7	7	"Donald the Frog Prince"	Rob LaDuca	Ashley Mendoza	May 27, 2006	107
Donald gets turned into a frog when he drinks Professor Von Drake's new potion and the only way to break the spell is with a kiss from Princess Daisy, who is held in a faraway tower.
8	8	"Minnie's Birthday"	Sherie Pollack	Story by : Leslie Valdes & Catherine Lieuwen; Teleplay by : Catherine Lieuwen	June 3, 2006	108
Today is Minnie's birthday, but the Clubhouse friends need to set up her birthday party.
9	9	"Goofy on Mars"	Sherie Pollack & Howy Parkins	Leslie Valdes	June 24, 2006	109
When Goofy crash lands on Mars, it's up to Mickey and friends to save him.
10	10	"Mickey-Go-Seek"	Rob LaDuca	Story by : Ashley Mendoza; Teleplay by : Leslie Valdes	July 8, 2006	110
Mickey plays hide-and-seek against Donald.
11	11	"Daisy's Dance"	Rob LaDuca	Story by : Ashley Mendoza; Teleplay by : Leslie Valdes	July 22, 2006	111
Mickey, Minnie, Goofy and Donald help Daisy get to the talent show to perform her new dance, but Daisy comes down with stage fright.
12	12	"Pluto's Ball"	Rob LaDuca & Howy Parkins	Story by : Leslie Valdes; Teleplay by : Ashley Mendoza	August 5, 2006	112
While playing a game of catch with Pluto's new super-duper bouncy ball, Goofy accidentally loses it and it bounces all around and Mickey and his friends must help him and Pluto catch it. Thanks to a little help from Minnie and Daisy.
13	13	"Mickey's Treasure Hunt"	Rob LaDuca & Howy Parkins	Story by : Ashley Mendoza; Teleplay by : Christopher Simmons	August 19, 2006	113
The Clubhouse friends go on a treasure hunt.
14	14	"Daisy in the Sky"	Sherie Pollack	Story by : Leslie Valdes; Teleplay by : Jeff Borkin	September 16, 2006	114
It's Happy Balloon Day and Professor Von Drake is giving away a batch of balloons. When Daisy borrows too many balloons for a picture, she's carried away with Minnie and Pluto in tow, and it's up to Mickey, Goofy and Donald to save them.
15	15	"Pluto's Puppy-Sitting Adventure"	Sherie Pollack	Story by : Leslie Valdes; Teleplay by : Christopher Simmons	September 16, 2006	115
While Clarabelle gets her hooves done, she asks Mickey and Pluto to puppy-sit her puppy, Bella, with instructions to play fetch, give her a bath, feed her lunch and sing her to sleep. But Pluto gets left out when Mickey, Minnie and Daisy get so busy taking care of Bella.
16	16	"Pluto's Best"	Sherie Pollack & Howy Parkins	Ashley Mendoza	September 22, 2006	116
Pluto does his best while competing in the doggy games against Pete’s dog, Butch. The two dogs play five events: juggling, pulling, jumping, doggy tricks, and doggy paddle, to see who will win the Big Gold Bone Trophy.
17	17	"Mickey's Treat"	Sherie Pollack	Story by : Leslie Valdes; Teleplay by : Ashley Mendoza	October 28, 2006	117
Pete invites everyone, including the viewer to a Halloween party at Trick-or-Treat Tower before the moon is full and the gates of Trick-or-Treat tower lock.
18	18	"Minnie Red Riding Hood"	Rob LaDuca	Story by : Leslie Valdes; Teleplay by : Rosemary Contreras	November 4, 2006	118
Goofy catches a cold while camping. Minnie plans to bring Goofy some of her "Minnie-stroni soup" so he can feel better on his camping trip.
19	19	"Sleeping Minnie"	Rob LaDuca	Ashley Mendoza	November 17, 2006	119
Minnie has accidentally picked one of Clarabelle's sleeping roses and has fallen fast asleep making her Sleeping Minnie. So it's up to Mickey, Goofy and Donald to get the golden harp and break the spell or Minnie won't wake up for a century.
20	20	"Mickey Saves Santa"	Rob LaDuca	Leslie Valdes	December 16, 2006 (Note: This was first released in Mickey Saves Santa and Other Mouseketales DVD on November 14, 2006.)	120
When Santa Claus crashes his sleigh on Mistletoe Mountain, Mickey and Donald dash off to rescue him along with Mrs. Claus in order to save Christmas.
21	21	"Goofy the Great"	Rob LaDuca	Ashley Mendoza	January 13, 2007	121
Goofy is getting ready to perform at the big magic show, but his tricks are broken and he can't remember the magic words.
22	22	"Mickey's Color Adventure"	Sherie Pollack & Victor Cook	Story by : Ashley Mendoza & Bobs Gannaway; Teleplay by : Ashley Mendoza	January 13, 2007	122
The Clubhouse has lost all of its colors and has turned black and white! Mickey and his friends have to collect items in the six colors of the rainbow to refill the Clubhouse's Rainbow Color Machine that Professor Von Drake owns and get their color back.
23	23	"Goofy's Petting Zoo"	Rob LaDuca	Story by : Leslie Valdes & Ashley Mendoza; Teleplay by : Jeff Borkin	February 2, 2007	123
The animals (eight cows, ten pigs and a baby elephant) from the petting zoo escape while zookeeper for the day, Goofy takes a nap, and it is up to Mickey, Minnie, Daisy and Donald to rescue the missing animals.
24	24	"Mickey's Great Clubhouse Hunt"	Rob LaDuca, Howy Parkins & Victor Cook	Ashley Mendoza	March 20, 2007	124
Pete is upset that he isn't invited to the Easter Egg Hunt, but when he recites the wrong magic words, the Clubhouse's sections float away in different directions. Now it's up to Mickey and his friends to return them.
25	25	"Doctor Daisy, M.D."	Sherie Pollack & Victor Cook	Story by : Leslie Valdes and Jeff Borkin; Teleplay by : Jeff Borkin	May 11, 2007	125
Pretend Dr. Daisy treats her patients' pretend ailments in hopes of getting her Pretend Doctor Sticker.
26	26	"Donald's Lost Lion"	Sherie Pollack	Ashley Mendoza	May 12, 2007	126
Donald has lost his toy lion, Sparky and he can't go to sleep without him, so the Clubhouse friends help look for him.
27	27	"Donald's Hiccups"	Sherie Pollack & Victor Cook	Leslie Valdes	July 27, 2007 (Note: This episode was first released in Mickey's Great Clubhouse Hunt DVD on March 20, 2007.)	127
The Clubhouse singers are set to appear on Clarabelle's TV show singing the Mickey Mouse March when Donald's hiccups become contagious! So it's up to Mickey and the others to scare off their especially Donald's unstoppable hiccups before the show begins.

=== Season 2 (2008–10) ===
No. overall	No. in season	Title	Directed by	Written by	Original release date	Prod. code
28	1	"Fancy Dancin' Goofy"	Donovan Cook & Victor Cook	Kelly Ward; Additional dialogue by : Ashley Mendoza	January 26, 2008	201
Goofy and Clarabelle are going together to the Fancy Dance at the Clubhouse but Goofy still has to get ready.
29	2	"Goofy the Homemaker"	Donovan Cook & Victor Cook	Mark Seidenberg	January 26, 2008	202
Goofy plans to build a birdhouse for the Red Birds beside the Clubhouse.
30	3	"Mickey's Handy Helpers"	Sherie Pollack	Mark Seidenberg	January 27, 2008	203
The Clubhouse's Handy Helpers are not working properly. All of the Clubhouse friends try to figure out what has happened to them. Pluto's squeaky ball is stuck in the handy dandy machine. When they get it out, the Handy helpers are working again and make dinner.
31	4	"Goofy Baby"	Sherie Pollack	Ashley Mendoza	January 27, 2008	204
Goofy has accidentally been turned into a baby by Professor Von Drake's time machine. So Mickey, Minnie, Pluto, Daisy and Donald have to bring him back to normal.
32	5	"Goofy in Training"	Donovan Cook & Victor Cook	Story by : Nicole Dubuc; Teleplay by : Don Gillies	February 23, 2008	206
Goofy is practicing for the Mickey Mouse Obstacle Course in hopes of winning a medal.
33	6	"Minnie's Picnic"	Sherie Pollack	Kelly Ward	February 9, 2008	205
Minnie organizes a picnic, inviting all their friends to come to celebrate the grand opening of the Mickey Park Picnic Grounds.
34	7	"Goofy's Hat"	Donovan Cook & Victor Cook	Kevin D. Campbell	March 15, 2008	208
Today is the Clubhouse's "Picture Day," where all of the Clubhouse friends get their picture taken. But it seems that Goofy is too disappointed to take his picture because he lost his hat. It's up to the Clubhouse friends to get it back for him.
35	8	"Mickey's Big Band Concert"	Donovan Cook & Victor Cook	Don Gillies	March 1, 2008	207
Mickey and his friends practice their band's music for the Mickey Park Polka-Palooza Dance Festival where the elephants will dance the Pachyderm Polka (the Sensational Six: Mickey on ukulele, Donald on tuba, Minnie on piano, Daisy on xylophone, Goofy on trombone and Pluto on metronome), but their instruments need to be repaired (Minnie's piano has the wrong pitch, Goofy's trombone slide is stuck, Daisy's xylophone is falling apart, Mickey's ukulele strings are out of tune and Donald's sheet music keep blowing away), Pluto's metronome is okay.
36	9	"Donald's Special Delivery"	Sherie Pollack	Brian Swenlin	April 12, 2008	209
The Clubhouse mail has arrived for all of the Clubhouse friends except Donald. It's up to the Clubhouse friends to make Donald feel better.
37	10	"Clarabelle's Clubhouse Carnival"	Sherie Pollack	Don Gillies	May 10, 2008	210
With Mickey and his friends' help, Clarabelle sets up a carnival at the Clubhouse grounds. The reason for it is her need to feed the chickens a lot of corn.
38	11	"Mickey and Minnie's Jungle Safari"	Donovan Cook	Kevin D. Campbell	June 21, 2008	211
Minnie wants to have a picture of a hula hibiscus to complete her flower picture collection, but she has only one day to get it when it is in full bloom. She will need help from all of her Clubhouse friends to get to where the flower is located.
39	12	"Mickey's Camp-Out"	Sherie Pollack & Broni Likomanov	Kevin D. Campbell	July 12, 2008	212
Mickey and his friends have a "Big Clubhouse Camp Out." They are trying to earn a Clubhouse Camp Out Badge for each one of them by doing two tasks at a campsite.
40	13	"Daisy's Pet Project"	Donovan Cook	Ashley Mendoza	April 19, 2008	213
Daisy has trouble finding a pet for the Pet Parade. She must find a pet before the Pet Parade starts. She gets three pets, an elephant named Bubbles, a giraffe named Longfellow and a bunny named Captain Jumps-a-Lot.
41	14	"Mickey's Big Job"	Donovan Cook	Don Gillies	August 23, 2008	214
The clubhouse friends help Mickey take care of Willie the Giant's farm while he's away to visit his mother.
42	15	"Mickey's Round-Up"	Sherie Pollack	Mark Seidenberg	August 9, 2008	215
Professor Von Drake's package of wild/out of control numbers has arrived at the Clubhouse. However, they are accidentally let out, and it is up to Mickey and his friends to don cowboy/cowgirl clothes and gear and round them all up to Mickey Corral on the grounds before the Professor returns from an errand.
43	16	"Pluto's Bubble Bath"	Donovan Cook	Kevin D. Campbell	September 6, 2008	216
Clarabelle and Bella are coming over for tea and biscuits and dog biscuits party when Pluto gets all dirty and needs a bubble bath. But when Pluto's bubble bath gets out of hand, Mickey and Pluto each get stuck inside a giant bubble and float away from the clubhouse.
44	17	"Mickey's Art Show"	Sherie Pollack & Broni Likomanov	Don Gillies	June 28, 2008	217
Goofy learns to sculpt, paint and draw so he can compete in an arts and crafts show sponsored by Mickey Mouse.
45	18	"Mickey's Silly Problem"	Donovan Cook	Mark Seidenberg	October 11, 2008	218
The clubhouse's "silly switch" gets stuck on silly and makes everyone act in comical ways, such as Mickey speaking in rhymes and Pluto making every animal sound except barking (such as meowing like a cat and mooing like a cow). They have to bring the clubhouse back to normal.
46	19	"Mickey's Thanks a Bunch Day"	Broni Likomanov	Mark Seidenberg	November 8, 2008	219
Minnie uses a growth spray in her garden to help her fruits and vegetables grow in time to be picked for Thanks-A-Bunch Day, but it turns them all into gigantic creations.
47	20	"Secret Spy Daisy"	Broni Likomanov & Sherie Pollack	Ashley Mendoza	November 17, 2008	220
Daisy protects Clarabelle's secret recipe for cookies from Pete.
48	21	"Pluto to the Rescue"	Donovan Cook	Ashley Mendoza	December 13, 2008	221
Pluto comes to the rescue when Goofy and Donald build a snowman so big, they can't climb around it or over it.
49	22	"Sir Goofs-a-Lot"	Donovan Cook	Don Gillies	January 10, 2009	222
Goofy wants to be knighted by Queen Clarabelle, so he proves his bravery by going on a quest to retrieve three items.
50	23	"Minnie's Mystery"	Sherie Pollack	Ashley Mendoza	January 24, 2009 (Note: This episode was first released in Mickey's Storybook Surprises DVD on September 2, 2008.)	223
Minnie attempts to find out who took her fresh-baked muffins from the clubhouse.
51	24	"Mickey's Comet"	Sherie Pollack	Don Gillies	February 7, 2009	224
Everyone wants to view Mickey's Comet, but first they have to find Professor Von Drake and his telescope.
52	25	"Clarabelle's Clubhouse Mooo-sical"	Broni Likomanov	Mark Seidenberg	February 21, 2009	225
Clarabelle stages a musical about nursery rhymes starring chickens from the petting zoo, but they practice so much, they have laryngitis. So Mickey and his friends replace the chickens while they need rest.
53	26	"Minnie's Rainbow"	Broni Likomanov	Kevin D. Campbell	March 7, 2009	226
Minnie searches for a pot of gold and meets a leprechaun after a rainbow appears over the clubhouse.
54	27	"Space Captain Donald"	Donovan Cook	Kevin D. Campbell	March 14, 2009	227
Donald leads the gang on a mission to the Moon to retrieve Pluto's bouncy ball.
55	28	"The Friendship Team"	Donovan Cook	Ashley Mendoza	April 4, 2009	228
Detective Minnie and Secret Spy Daisy need your help to search for missing party hats for the clubhouse's Friendship Day celebration.
56	29	"Mickey's Message from Mars"	Donovan Cook	Don Gillies	May 2, 2009	229
Mickey, Pluto, Goofy, and Daisy fly up to Mars and help Martian Mickey find a secret treasure.
57	30	"Pete's Beach Blanket Luau"	Donovan Cook	Don Gillies	June 20, 2009 (Note: This episode was first released in Mickey's Big Splash DVD on May 5, 2009.)	230
Pete invites the viewer and the Clubhouse friends to a beach party luau to cool off on the hottest day of the year.
58	31	"Donald's Ducks"	Broni Likomanov	Ashley Mendoza	September 12, 2009	231
Donald helps a group of ducks get to a warm beach for their winter retreat. Note: This was the final episode to be released during Wayne Allwine's lifetime. However, since recording for the rest of the second season and all of the third had been completed by the time of his death, many episodes featuring him released posthumously.
59	32	"Goofy's Coconutty Monkey"	Broni Likomanov	Kevin D. Campbell	October 5, 2009	232
When Goofy's friend Coco the Monkey can't find any coconuts for her "coconutty party," Goofy, the Clubhouse Gang take a trip into the jungle in search of coconuts.
60	33	"Choo-Choo Express"	Donovan Cook	Mark Seidenberg	October 25, 2009	233
The Clubhouse Gang build a train, so they can carry the Professor's non-melting snow to the Clubhouse. Note: This episode was dedicated "in loving memory" to Wayne Allwine, who had voiced Mickey Mouse since 1977, as he died on May 18, 2009.
61	34	"Minnie's Bee Story"	Donovan Cook	Kevin D. Campbell	August 1, 2009	234
Mickey and his friends help Minnie's friend, Buzz-Buzz the Bee, find his way back home after a strong wind blows him off a sunflower, especially after Donald swats him.
62	35	"Pluto's Playmate"	Broni Likomanov	Ashley Mendoza	August 29, 2009	235
Mickey and his friends help Salty the Seal do tricks for the circus.
63	36	"Mickey and the Enchanted Egg"	Sherie Pollack & Broni Likomanov	Ashley Mendoza	November 14, 2009	236
Mickey finds an egg that hatches a baby dragon and he, Donald, and Goofy try to return the dragon to its home and prove to Wizard Pete that he did not steal it.
64	37	"Goofy Goes Goofy"	Sherie Pollack & Broni Likomanov	Mark Seidenberg	November 21, 2009 (Note: This episode was first released in Mickey's Adventure in Wonderland DVD on September 9, 2009.)	237
Goofy gets cloned after Professor Von Drake's new experimental Gooey-Goo splashes onto him. Mickey and his friends must take care of the clones until the effect wears off and all the Goofys will go back into 1.
65	38	"Mickey's Adventures in Wonderland"	Donovan Cook	Ashley Mendoza	December 12, 2009	238
A cuckoo bird that's a birthday gift for Daisy flies out of the clock, and Mickey and Donald embark on an imaginative Alice in Wonderland-like adventure to retrieve it.
66	39	"Goofy's Super Wish"	Broni Likomanov	Kevin D. Campbell	January 9, 2010	239
Goofy trains to be a superhero and uses his skills after Clarabelle's moo-muffin maker breaks.
67	40	"Mickey's Big Surprise"	Donovan Cook	Mark Seidenberg	February 2009 (Playhouse Disney.com); February 20, 2010 (TV)	240
A fireworks display, as it's presented to you by Mickey. But first, five puzzles need to be solved.

=== Season 3 (2010–12) ===
This is the final season that Wayne Allwine voices Mickey Mouse.

No. overall	No. in season	Title	Directed by	Written by	Original release date	Prod. code
68	1	"Goofy's Goofbot"	Donovan Cook	Ashley Mendoza	February 27, 2010	310
On "Build-Your-Own-Toy Day" Goofy builds a stronger, smarter robot that looks just like himself. Goofy named his robot Goofbot. And the Clubhouse friends need to help Goofy finish building Goofbot in time for the Fair.
69	2	"Mickey's Springtime Surprise"	Donovan Cook	Ashley Mendoza	March 27, 2010	328
Mickey and Minnie organize an egg hunt to celebrate the first day of spring.
70	3	"Super Goof's Super Puzzle"	Howy Parkins	Kevin D. Campbell	April 10, 2010	322
Goofy turns into his alter ego Super Goof to help his friends solve Puzzler Pete's challenging puzzles.
71	4	"Donald of the Desert"	Donovan Cook	Kevin D. Campbell	May 8, 2010	306
Donald discovers a magic lamp when he travels to a desert to get sand for the clubhouse sandbox.
72	5	"Happy Birthday Toodles"	Howy Parkins	Don Gillies	May 22, 2010	313
Mickey and his friends plan a surprise birthday party for Toodles. Note: This is the first episode where Toodles has a face and is voiced by Rob Paulsen.
73	6	"Goofy's Magical Mix-Up"	Howy Parkins	Don Gillies	June 19, 2010	301
Goofy's magic trick accidentally makes Pluto's doghouse disappear from the clubhouse and Mickey and his friends must find a way to bring it back.
74	7	"Pluto's Dinosaur Romp"	Donovan Cook	Kevin D. Campbell	July 3, 2010	307
When Pluto's bouncy ball bounces into Professor Von Drake's time machine, a baby dinosaur travels through time to the clubhouse as it bounces out and Mickey and his friends try to return it to its prehistoric home.
75	8	"Minnie's Pajama Party"	Donovan Cook	Ashley Mendoza	August 7, 2010 (Note: This episode was first released in Minnie's Bow-tique DVD on February 9. 2010.)	304
Minnie hosts a pajama party.
76	9	"Road Rally" (Note: This episode is a one-hour special.)	Howy Parkins	Mark Seidenberg	September 7, 2010	332–333
Mickey and his friends participate in a road rally that takes them across sandy deserts, over snow-covered mountains and through lush jungles. Along the way, they look for Mickey Markers, with the help of Goofy in the brand new Rescue Truck. But Toodles feels the Clubhouse friends don’t need his help anymore due to the Rescue Truck, they feel bad and sing him a song saying they will never have a better friend than him. Note: This extended-length episode was released to DVD the same day it aired.
77	10	"Donald the Genie"	Howy Parkins	Kevin D. Campbell	October 18, 2010	310
Donald becomes a magical genie who is able to grant each friend one wish.
78	11	"Daisy's Grasshopper"	Donovan Cook	Kevin D. Campbell	November 8, 2010	302
Daisy searches for her new friend, Wilbur the Grasshopper.
79	12	"Mickey's Mousekersize"	Donovan Cook	Mark Seidenberg	November 22, 2010	319
After Pete becomes exhausted playing basketball, Mickey and his friends teaches him the importance of exercising. Note: This episode spawned a spin-off miniseries with ten 3-minute-long episodes that were aired on Disney Junior as interstitial programming.
80	13	"Mickey's Little Parade"	Howy Parkins	Don Gillies	December 20, 2010	308
Mickey and his friends search for three wind-up toy musicians after they run about due to being wound too tight just before a parade appearance.
81	14	"Minnie's Mouseke-Calendar"	Howy Parkins	Mark Seidenberg	January 3, 2011	303
The wind blows away the pages from Minnie's daily calendar, so it's up to Mickey, Pluto and Goofy to help collect them and put them back for her while Daisy and Donald stay at the clubhouse to make sure nothing blows away.
82	15	"Pluto Lends a Paw"	Howy Parkins	Ashley Mendoza	February 14, 2011 (Note: This episode was first released in Road Rally DVD on September 7, 2010.)	316
Mickey and Pluto help Minnie search for her missing cat, Figaro after he wanders away from the clubhouse.
83	16	"Minnie's Bow-tique"	Donovan Cook	Don Gillies	February 28, 2011	309
Minnie opens a boutique filled with a variety of bows and bow-ties.
84	17	"Minnie's Masquerade"	Howy Parkins	Ashley Mendoza	April 11, 2011 (Note: This episode was first released in Minnie's Masquerade DVD on February 8, 2011.)	325
Minnie plans a masquerade ball, where the Clubhouse friends can dress up in their favorite costumes.
85	18	"Goofy's Giant Adventure"	Howy Parkins	Don Gillies	May 9, 2011	305
Goofy searches for a magical elixir (bubbly water) to cure Willie the Giant's stomachache and meets some enchanting fairy-tale characters along the way.
86	19	"Donald's Clubhouse"	Donovan Cook	Mark Seidenberg	June 9, 2011	315
Donald takes care of the clubhouse while Mickey goes to the Moo-Mart to help Clarabelle, Minnie, and Daisy catch her moo-muffins after she accidentally add jumping beans and it quickly turns into a disaster area when he and Goofy make a huge mess just before Mother Goose Clarabelle is to visit.
87	20	"Mickey's Show and Tell"	Donovan Cook	Bobs Gannaway	June 24, 2011 (Note: This episode was first released in Numbers Roundup DVD on November 16, 2010.)	321
Martian Mickey visits the clubhouse for a "Show-and-Tell with Shapes" presentation.
88	21	"Mickey's Fishy Story"	Howy Parkins	Kevin D. Campbell	July 29, 2011 (Note: This episode was first released in Mickey's Great Outdoors DVD on May 24, 2011.)	314
Mickey and his friends travel to the jungle to find a "swimming friend" for Daisy's pet goldfish Goldy.
89	22	"Space Adventure"	Donovan Cook	Kevin D. Campbell, Don Gillies & Mark Seidenberg	September 12, 2011	330–331
Mickey and his friends travel into space to search for intergalactic treasure. Note 1: This is the first episode where the Hot Dog Dance is done somewhere else other than the clubhouse. Note 2: This episode was dedicated to character designer Dana Landsberg, who died on December 30, 2009.
90	23	"The Go-Getters"	Donovan Cook	Ashley Mendoza	September 26, 2011	312
Detective Minnie, Secret Spy Daisy, and Captain Clarabelle round up a group of baby chicks that running loose in a park.
91	24	"Goofy's Gone"	Donovan Cook	Don Gillies	October 24, 2011	326
Detective Minnie, Secret Spy Daisy, and Captain Clarabelle search for Goofy when he goes missing.
92	25	"Goofy Babysitter"	Howy Parkins	Mark Seidenberg & Ashley Mendoza	November 7, 2011	329
Goofy babysits when Mickey, Minnie, Pluto, Daisy and Donald are accidentally turned into toddlers by Professor Von Drake's time machine.
93	26	"Pluto's Tale"	Donovan Cook	Ashley Mendoza	January 20, 2012	320
Pluto is a brave prince who is trying to rescue a princess from a wizard's castle.
94	27	"Goofy's Thinking Cap"	Howy Parkins	Kevin D. Campbell	March 9, 2012 (Note: This episode was first released in Space Adventure DVD on November 8, 2011.)	324
Clarabelle Cow plans a scavenger hunt and Professor Von Drake lets Goofy borrow his new invention to help everyone figure out the clues.
95	28	"Minnie and Daisy's Flower Shower"	Howy Parkins	Kelly Ward	April 2, 2012 (Note: This episode was first released in I ❤ Minnie DVD on February 7, 2012.)	327
Minnie and Daisy host a flower show for their friends.
96	29	"Prince Pete's Catnap"	Howy Parkins	Ashley Mendoza	May 4, 2012	329
Prince Pete experiences trouble falling asleep, so the Clubhouse friends pitch in to help him.
97	30	"Aye, Aye, Captain Mickey"	Howy Parkins	Kelly Ward	June 15, 2012	318
The Sensational Six board Professor Von Drake's new submarine to retrieve Mickey's lucky coin.
98	31	"Donald Hatches an Egg"	Donovan Cook	Don Gillies	July 13, 2012	317
Donald cares for a lost egg, while his friends search for its family.
99	32	"The Golden Boo-Boo"	Howy Parkins	Don Gillies	September 28, 2012	323
Mickey and Daisy are dressed as detectives and, with the help of Minnie, Goofy, Donald, Professor Von Drake, and Clarabelle, they are on a mission to search for the golden statue of Boo Boo Chicken, before Pete gets to it first. Note: This is the last episode that Wayne Allwine voices Mickey Mouse.

=== Season 4 (2012–16) ===
At the beginning of season three, Disney announced that Mickey Mouse Clubhouse was renewed for a fourth season, set to air on Disney Junior in the summer of 2012. Season 4 contains 26 episodes. Following Wayne Allwine's death, Bret Iwan took over the voice of Mickey Mouse. In addition, all episodes centered on Minnie Mouse during this season were marketed as "Minnie Specials".

In 2014, Bill Farmer, the voice actor for Goofy and Pluto, reported that the recording of dialogue for new episodes had ceased, and the series ended in 2016.

No. overall	No. in season	Title	Directed by	Written by	Storyboard by	Original release date	Prod. code	U.S. viewers (millions)
100	1	"Mickey and Donald Have a Farm"	Donovan Cook	Mark Seidenberg	Roger Dondis, Kirk Hanson, Thomas Morgan	November 5, 2012	401	1.80
Mickey and his pals set out to rescue all of the missing animals from the Clubhouse Farm.
101	2	"Quest for the Crystal Mickey"	Donovan Cook	Don Gillies	Roger Dondis, Kirk Hanson, Tom Morgan	March 8, 2013	405	2.30
Pete snatches the Crystal Mickey statue from the clubhouse and it's up to the Sensational Six to find it. Otherwise, the clubhouse will disappear.
102	3	"Daisy's Pony Tale"	Phil Weinstein	Ashley Mendoza	Dave Bennett, Dave Williams	April 5, 2013	406	2.05
Professor Von Drake's new invention makes Daisy's ponytail grow long.
103	4	"Mickey's Farm Fun Fair"	Phil Weinstein	Mark Seidenberg	Eugene Salandra, Rossen Varbanov	August 16, 2013	404	2.06
Mickey hosts a farm fun fair with many fun games.
104	5	"Minnie Special: The Wizard of Dizz!" (Note: This episode is a 53-minute special.)	Donovan Cook	Ashley Mendoza	Dave Bennett, Holly Forsyth, Kirk Hanson, Broni Likomanov, Douglas McCarthy, Tom Morgan, Andrei Svislotski	September 20, 2013 (Note: This episode was first released in Minnie's Wizard of Dizz DVD on June 11, 2013.)	421–422	1.54
Minnie and Pluto get swept up in a big wind and end up in the wonderful world of Dizz. And they need to get back to the clubhouse for the "Clubhouse Day" party.
105	6	"Super Adventure!"	Donovan Cook	Thomas Hart	Troy Adomitis, Robert Kline, Mike Kunkel, Tom Morgan	October 18, 2013	503–504	1.66
Professor Von Drake uses a machine he invented to turn the Clubhouse Gang into Clubhouse Heroes after Mickey discovers a villain named Megamort shrinking the Clubhouse world, who later reveals himself as Mortimer Mouse.
106	7	"Mickey's Mystery"	Donovan Cook	Don Gillies	Tony Craig, Carin-Anne Greco	November 4, 2013	407	1.68
Kansas City Mickey returns to help the Clubhouse Team solve a mystery in the Hidden Jungle.
107	8	"Minnie Special: Minnie's Pet Salon"	Donovan Cook	S : Don Gillies; S/T : Ashley Mendoza	Kirk Hanson, Douglas McCarthy, Tom Morgan	November 22, 2013	417	1.97
Minnie and her friends prepare their pets for Pluto's All-Star Pet Show at Minnie's Pet Salon.
108	9	"Minnie Special: Minnie-rella"	Phil Weinstein	Ashley Mendoza	Carole Holliday, Eugene Salandra, Rossen Varbanov	February 14, 2014 (Note: This episode was first released in Minnie-rella DVD on February 11, 2014.)	412	2.35
Minnie falls asleep while doing chores and has a dream that she is Minnie-rella!
109	10	"Mickey's Clubhouse Rocks"	Phil Weinstein	Mark Seidenberg	Lonnie Lloyd, Douglas McCarthy, Eugene Salandra, Rossen Varbanov	April 1, 2014	420	1.32
Mickey and his friends join together for a Clubhouse battle of the bands. But Donald never had a chance to be in a band.
110	11	"Donald Jr."	Phil Weinstein	Ashley Mendoza	Dave Bennett, Dave Williams	June 6, 2014	402	1.80
On "Show Your Special Talent Day", Donald teaches Donald Jr. steps to a dance. But he's going to need some help from Mickey before the show starts.
111	12	"Sea Captain Mickey"	Phil Weinstein	Kelly Ward	Dave Bennett, Dave Williams	July 18, 2014	414	1.92
Mickey and the gang hop into the Clubhouse Submarine and set out to find the "Big Something" at the bottom of Mickey Lake, which turns out to be Willie the Giant’s rubby ducky he dropped while taking a bath.
112	13	"Mickey's Pirate Adventure"	Donovan Cook	Thomas Hart	Troy Adomitis, Robert Kline, Mike Kunkel, Tom Morgan	October 10, 2014	505–506	1.44
The Clubhousers are enjoying a day at the beach when a pirate named Peg Leg Pete delivers a note from Goofy's long lost Grandpappy, Captain Goof-Beard, asking for Goofy's and the gang's help in ensuring that Harmony-Chord Island, the musical isle where Goof-Beard lives, doesn't go completely out of tune and sink.
113	14	"Mickey's Happy Mousekeday"	Phil Weinstein	Mark Seidenberg	Dave Bennett, Lonnie Lloyd	November 18, 2014	418	N/A
It's Mickey's birthday, and for his birthday present, the Clubhouse Gang has organized fun activities for the big Mousekeday.
114	15	"Minnie Special: Minnie's Winter Bow Show"	Phil Weinstein	T : Thomas Hart; S/T : Ashley Mendoza	Kurt Anderson, Dave Bennett, Douglas McCarthy, Rossen Varbanov	December 5, 2014 (Note: This episode was first released in Minnie's Winter Bow Show DVD on November 18, 2014.)	509–510	1.50
While putting together for the Winter Bow Show, Minnie and her nieces, Millie and Melody get swept up in a big wind and end up at the Clubhouse North Pole.
115	16	"Around the Clubhouse World"	Donovan Cook	Ashley Mendoza	Holly Forsyth, Carole Holliday, Broni Likomanov, Andrei Svislotski (Note: Mistakenly credited as Andre Svislotski.)	January 19, 2015 (Note: This episode was first released on Around the Clubhouse World DVD on May 20, 2014.)	415	2.32
Mickey, Minnie and Pluto travel around the world to collect stamps for their special Clubhouse Passport.
116	17	"Mickey's Mousekeball"	Donovan Cook	Mark Drop	Carin-Anne Greco (Note: Mistakenly credited as Carin Ann Greco.), Lonnie Lloyd, Andrei Svislotski	April 3, 2015	411	1.68
Professor Von Drake shows the Clubhouse friends a high-tech new game, the Floatin' Fun-Time Mousekeball! But when the ball escapes, the game takes to the skies.
117	18	"Donald's Brand New Clubhouse"	Phil Weinstein	Mark Seidenberg	Eugene Salandra, Rossen Varbanov	June 12, 2015	416	1.61
Donald complains everyone is in his way; Mickey and pals build a clubhouse.
118	19	"Mickey's Mousekedoer Adventure"	Donovan Cook	Don Gillies	Roger Dondis, Kirk Hanson, Tom Morgan	June 26, 2015	409	2.29
The Mousekedoer malfunctions and needs to be fixed, so Professor Von Drake sends Mickey, Goofy, Donald, and Toodles inside the Mousekedoer to fix it.
119	20	"Mickey's Monster Musical"	Phil Weinstein	Ashley Mendoza	Kurt Anderson, Dave Bennett, Douglas McCarthy, Rossen Varbanov	October 9, 2015 (Note: This episode was first released in Mickey's Monster Musical DVD on September 8, 2015.)	507–508	1.87
Mickey, Minnie, and Pluto offer to help Count Mickula find out what is haunting his castle after Mickey's Toon Car breaks down.
120	21	"Minnie Special: Pop Star Minnie"	Donovan Cook	S : Don Gillies, Mark Seidenberg; T : Kelly Ward	Holly Forsyth, Carole Holliday, Broni Likomanov, Andrei Svislotski	November 11, 2015	419	1.49
Minnie gets to sing at Mount Melody with the help of her friends, but all the instruments are missing and have been taken by Pete.
121	22	"Chef Goofy on the Go"	Phil Weinstein	Mark Drop	Eugene Salandra, Rossen Varbanov	February 19, 2016	408	1.71
Mickey and his friends help Goofy serve up deliveries from his "Chef Goofy On The Go" lunch truck.
122	23	"Oh Toodles"	Phil Weinstein	Ashley Mendoza	Dave Bennett, Dave Williams	May 6, 2016	410	1.29
Professor Von Drake can only finish his invention when he gets back four special tools that he has lent. So Mickey and Toodles went on a quest to get them back.
123	24	"Mickey's Sport-Y-Thon"	Donovan Cook	Don Gillies	Roger Dondis, Kirk Hanson, Tom Morgan	August 22, 2016 (Note: This episode was first released on Mickey's Sport-Y-Thon DVD on May 24, 2016.)	413	N/A
Mickey and his friends are preparing for their own marathon of sports games and the winners each receive a medal. But when a spaceship lands, they find themselves competing against Martian Mickey and Martian Minnie. The other world visitors will have to learn how to play fair to play a nice, clean game.
124	25	"Minnie Special: Martian Minnie's Tea Party"	Donovan Cook	Don Gillies	Tony Craig, Carin-Anne Greco	October 14, 2016	403	1.33
Martian Minnie is planning a tea party on Mars. Clearly, Minnie is giving her extraterrestrial friend a hand.
125	26	"A Goofy Fairy Tale"	Phil Weinstein	Ashley Mendoza	Dave Bennett, Holly Forsyth, Eugene Salandra, Rossen Varbanov	November 6, 2016	501–502	1.68
In the series finale, Goofy's magic trick accidentally makes all of the bedtime stories disappear from the clubhouse and he must find a way to bring them back.

== Short series ==
=== Mickey's Mousekersize (2011) ===
Mickey's Mousekersize is a short series. It premiered on February 14, 2011. Characters that are featured in the short series are Mickey Mouse, Minnie Mouse, Donald Duck, Goofy, Pluto, and Toodles. The series consists of ten episodes. In addition to airing in the United States, the short series aired in the United Kingdom and France.

No.	Title	Original release date
1	"Follow the Mouse"	February 14, 2011
Mickey teaches Minnie and Pluto how to do a parade.
2	"Minnie the Cat"	February 15, 2011
Minnie tries to find Figaro.
3	"Pluto Has a Ball"	February 16, 2011
Mickey and Goofy help Pluto get his bouncy ball back.
4	"Jumping Goofs"	February 17, 2011
Mickey helps Goofy pop bubbles.
5	"Donald's Hole in One"	February 18, 2011
Mickey and Goofy help Donald swing his golf club.
6	"Clarabelle's Muffin Toss"	February 21, 2011
Mickey helps Clarabelle toss a muffin into a basket.
7	"Mickey Says"	February 22, 2011
Mickey helps Goofy and Minnie play "Mickey Says."
8	"Goofy's Swingin' Soccer"	February 23, 2011
Minnie helps Goofy kick a soccer ball.
9	"Minnie's Jump Rope Jamboree"	February 24, 2011
Mickey and Minnie help Donald jump onto his straw horse.
10	"Goofy's Sprinkling Can"	February 25, 2011
Goofy helps Pete water his flowers.

=== Mickey's World Record Animals (2011–2014) ===
Mickey's World Record Animals follows Mickey finding the record-setter in different fields. Mickey Mouse is voiced by Bret Iwan in this series. Each episode is approximately 2 minutes long.

No.	Title	Original release date
1	"Most Teeth"	February 14, 2011
Which animal has the most teeth out of a hippopotamus, crocodile, or shark? The mystery mouse-a-tool is an abacus.
2	"Longest Tongue"	February 21, 2011
Which animal has the longest tongue out of a chameleon, anteater, or giraffe? The mystery mouse-a-tool is an ice pole.
3	"Lays the Biggest Egg"	February 28, 2011
Which animal lays the biggest egg out of a penguin, ostrich, or an albatross? The mystery mouse-a-tool is a band of ribbon.
4	"Most Hair"	March 4, 2011
Which animal has the most hair out of a musk ox, sheep, or a polar bear? The mystery mouse-a-tool is an electric shaver.
5	"Jump the Furthest"	March 11, 2011
Which animal can jump the furthest out of a kangaroo, cougar, or a cricket? The mystery mouse-a-tool is a bicycle.
6	"Fastest Slow Animal"	April 21, 2012
Which animal is the fastest slow animal out of a sloth, tortoise, or a snail? The mystery mouse-a-tool is a pitch.
7	"Longest"	April 28, 2012
Which animal is the longest out of a blue whale, white shark, or a giant squid? The mystery mouse-a-tool is Mickey's Toon Car.
8	"Strongest"	May 1, 2012
Which animal is the strongest out of an elephant, gorilla, or ant? The mystery mouse-a-tool is a log.
9	"Fastest Fast Animal"	May 8, 2012
Which animal is the fastest fast animal out of a cheetah, horse, or a falcon? The mystery mouse-a-tool is a stop clock.
10	"Heaviest Land Animal"	January 1, 2014
Which animal is the heaviest land animal out of an elephant, rhinoceros, or a hippopotamus? The mystery mouse-a-tool is a scale.

=== Where's Pluto ===
Animated shorts of approx 1–2 minutes long, similar to Where's Waldo.

== Home media releases ==
The following are the DVD releases for Mickey Mouse Clubhouse with episodes included and availability. All DVD releases are distributed by Walt Disney Studios Home Entertainment.

=== Region 1 (America) ===
Title	Episodes	Release date	UPC
Mickey Mouse Clubhouse: Mickey Saves Santa	Episode 020 – Mickey Saves Santa; Episode 003 – Goofy's Bird; Episode 010 – Mickey-Go-Seek; Episode 009 – Goofy On Mars	November 14, 2006	786936704266
Mickey Mouse Clubhouse: Mickey's Great Clubhouse Hunt	Episode 024 – Mickey's Great Clubhouse Hunt; Episode 027 – Donald's Hiccups; Episode 018 – Minnie Red Riding Hood	March 20, 2007	786936715149
Mickey Mouse Clubhouse: Mickey's Treat	Episode 017 – Mickey's Treat; Episode 021 – Goofy the Great; Episode 025 – Doctor Daisy, M.D.	August 28, 2007	786936743548
Mickey Mouse Clubhouse: Mickey's Storybook Surprises	Episode 050 – Minnie's Mystery; Episode 007 – Donald the Frog Prince; Episode 018 – Minnie Red Riding Hood; Episode 019 – Sleeping Minnie	September 2, 2008	786936764581
Mickey Mouse Clubhouse: Mickey's Big Splash	Episode 058 – Donald's Ducks; Episode 043 – Pluto's Bubble Bath; Episode 006 – Mickey Goes Fishing; Episode 057 – Pete's Beach Blanket Luau	May 5, 2009	786936789355
Mickey Mouse Clubhouse: Mickey's Adventures in Wonderland	Episode 065 – Mickey's Adventures In Wonderland; Episode 064 – Goofy Goes Goofy	September 8, 2009	786936746792
Mickey Mouse Clubhouse: Choo-Choo Express	Episode 060 – Choo-Choo Express; Episode 043 – Mickeys BIG Job	December 1, 2009	786936787849
Mickey Mouse Clubhouse: Minnie's Bow-Tique	Episode 075 – Minnie's Pajama Party; Episode 083 – Minnie's Bow-Tique; Episode 061 – Minnie's Bee Story; Episode 032 – Minnie's Picnic	February 9, 2010	786936796445
Mickey Mouse Clubhouse: Road Rally	Episode 076 – Road Rally; Episode 082 - Pluto Lends a Paw	September 7, 2010	786936804225
Mickey Mouse Clubhouse: Numbers Round-Up	Episode 042 – Mickey's Round-Up; Episode 001 – Daisy Bo-Peep; Episode 067 – Mickey's Big Surprise; Episode 070 – Super Goof's Super Puzzle; Episode 087 – Mickey's Show and Tell	November 16, 2010	786936804348
Mickey Mouse Clubhouse: Minnie's Masquerade	Episode 084 – Minnie's Masquerade; Episode 081 – Minnie's Mouseke-Calendar; Episode 002 – A Surprise For Minnie; Episode 047 – Secret Spy Daisy; Episode 055 – The Friendship Team	February 8, 2011	786936804468
Mickey Mouse Clubhouse: Mickey's Great Outdoors	Episode 039 – Mickey's Camp Out; Episode 038 – Mickey and Minnie's Jungle Safari; Episode 088 – Mickey's Fishy Story; Episode 014 - Daisy In The Sky; Episode 078 – Daisy's Grasshopper	May 24, 2011	786936813869
Mickey Mouse Clubhouse: Space Adventure	Episode 089 – Space Adventure; Episode 094 – Goofy’s Thinking Cap	November 8, 2011	786936818826
Mickey Mouse Clubhouse: I Heart Minnie	Episode 007 – Minnie’s Birthday; Episode 011 – Daisy’s Dance />Episode 040 – Daisy's Pet Project; Episode 053 – Minnie's Rainbow; Episode 095 – Minnie and Daisy's Flower Shower	February 7th, 2012	786936819717
Mickey Mouse Clubhouse: Mickey and Donald Have a Farm	Episode 100 – Mickey and Donald Have A Farm; Episode 023 – Goofy's Petting Zoo; Episode 052 – Clarabelle's Clubhouse Mooo-sical; Episode 029 – Goofy the Homemaker; Episode 098 – Donald Hatches an Egg	December 11th, 2012	786936832358
Mickey Mouse Clubhouse: Quest for the Crystal Mickey	Episode 101 – Quest For the Crystal Mickey; Episode 071— Donald of the Desert/>Episode 077 – Donald the Genie; Episode 059 – Goofy's Coconutty Monkey; Episode 085 – Goofy's Giant Adventure	May 21, 2013	786936834055
Mickey Mouse Clubhouse: Minnie's the Wizard of Dizz	Episode 104 – Minnie's the Wizard of Dizz; Episode 099 – The Golden Boo Boo; Episode 091 Goofy’s Gone; Ten episodes of "Minnie's Bow-Toons"	June 11th, 2013	786936832396
Mickey Mouse Clubhouse: Super Adventure!	Episode 105 – Super Adventure />Episode 097 – Aye, Aye, Captain Mickey; Episode 079 – Mickey’s Mouskesize />Episode 080. - Mickey’s Little Parade	December 3, 2013	786936832358
Mickey Mouse Clubhouse: Minnie-rella	Episode 108 – Minnie-rella; Episode 093 – Pluto's Tale; Episode 063 – Mickey and the Enchanted Egg; Episode 102 – Daisy's Pony Tale; Ten episodes of "Minnie's Bow-Toons"	February 11, 2014	786936832358
Mickey Mouse Clubhouse: Minnie's Winter Bow Show	Episode 114 – Minnie's Winter Bow Show; Episode 0– Martian Minnie’s Tea Party; Episode 0 – Sea Captain Mickey; Episode 038 –Chef Goofy On the Go! Twenty episodes of "Minnie's Bow-Toons" (Season 3)	November 18, 2014	786936843446

=== Region 2 (UK) ===
Mickey Mouse Clubhouse – Mickey's Great Clubhouse Hunt
Set Details
Special Features
Episodes
- English (Stereo), French (Stereo), and Spanish (Stereo)

The Best Easter ever sing-a-long

- Episode 26 – "Mickey's Great Clubhouse Hunt"
- Episode 25 – "Donald's Hiccups"
Release Dates
United Kingdom
United States
Australia
2 April 2007
March 20, 2007
mickey mouse easter egg hunt

Mickey Mouse Clubhouse – Mickey's Treat
Set Details
Special Features
Episodes
- English (Stereo), French (Stereo) and Spanish (Stereo)

Little Einsteins - "A Little Einsteins Halloween" (Season 1, episode 12)

- Episode 12 – Mickey's Treat
- Episode 19 – Goofy the Great
- Episode 22 – Doctor Daisy, M.D.
Release Dates
United Kingdom
United States
Australia
22 September 2008
August 28, 2007
October 12, 2009

Mickey Mouse Clubhouse – Mickey's Storybook Surprises
Set Details
Special Features
Episodes
- English (Stereo), French (Stereo) and Spanish (Stereo)
- Little Einsteins – "Brothers and Sisters to the Rescue" (Season 2, episode 2)
- Tales from Toodles
- Episode 9 – "Donald the Frog Prince"
- Episode 17 – "Mickey Red Riding Hood"
- Episode 24 – "Sleeping Minnie"
Release Dates
United Kingdom
United States
Australia
17 March 2008
September 2, 2008
TBA

Mickey Mouse Clubhouse – Mickey's Big Splash
Set Details
Special Features
Episodes
- English (Stereo), French (Stereo) and Spanish (Stereo)
- Little Einsteins - "Pirate's Treasure" (Season 1, episode 6)
- Fun in the Sun with Mickey and the Gang
- Episode 65 – "Donald's Ducks"
- Episode 49 – "Pluto's Bubble Bath"
- Episode 7 – "Mickey Goes Fishing"
- Episode 55 – "Pete's Beach Blanket Luau"
Release Dates
United Kingdom
United States
Australia
27 July 2009
May 5, 2009
TBA

Mickey Mouse Clubhouse – Mickey's Adventures in Wonderland
Set Details
Special Features
Episodes
- English (Stereo)

3 Fun Ways To Watch And Play!
Fastplay
Adventure Mode 1 (Ages 2–3)
Adventure Mode 2 (Ages 4–6)

- Episode 6 – "Donald's Big Balloon Race"
- Episode 16 – "Daisy in the Sky"
- Episode 14 – "Pluto's Puppy-Sitting Adventure"
- Episode 15 – "Mickey's Treasure Hunt"
Release Dates
United Kingdom
United States
Australia
5 August 2007
September 8, 2009
TBA

Mickey Mouse Clubhouse – Mickey's Treasure Hunt
Set Details
Special Features
Episodes
- English (Stereo)

Unknown special features

- Episode 15 – "Mickey's Treasure Hunt"
- Episode 26 - "Donald's Lost Lion"
- Episode 36 - "Goofy's Hat"
Release Dates
United Kingdom
United States
Australia
26 October 2009
TBA
TBA

Mickey Mouse Clubhouse – Mickey Go Seek
Set Details
Special Features
Episodes
- English (Stereo)

Unknown special features

- Episode 13 – "Mickey-Go-Seek"
- Unknown episode
- Unknown episode 2
Release Dates
United Kingdom
United States
Australia
26 October 2009
TBA
TBA

Mickey Mouse Clubhouse – Choo-Choo Express
Set Details
Special Features
Episodes
- English (Stereo)

Game Time – Adventure Mode

- Episode 61 – "Choo Choo Express"
- Episode 37 – "Donald's Special Delivery"
Release Dates
United Kingdom
United States
Australia
1 November 2010
December 1, 2009
TBA

Mickey Mouse Clubhouse – Detective Minnie
Set Details
Special Features
Episodes
- English (Stereo)

My Friends Tigger & Pooh – "Pooh's Cookie Tree / Lumpy Joins In" (Season 2, episode 4)

- Episode 51 – "Secret Spy Daisy"
- Episode 59 – "The Friendship Team"
- Episode 41 – "Clarabelle's Clubhouse Carnival"
Release Dates
United Kingdom
United States
Australia
18 January 2010
TBA
TBA

Mickey Mouse Clubhouse – Valentines
Set Details
Special Features
Episodes
- English (Stereo)

Unknown special features

- Unknown episode
- Unknown episode 2
- Unknown episode 3
Release Dates
United Kingdom
United States
Australia
1 February 2010
TBA
TBA

Mickey Mouse Clubhouse – Bow-tique
Set Details
Special Features
Episodes
- English (Stereo)
- Game Time - "Discovery Mode"
- Episode 92 – "Minnie's Bow-tique"
- Episode 72 – "Minnie's Pajama Party"
- Episode 32 – "Minnie's Picnic"
- Episode 65 – "Minnie's Bee Story"
Release Dates
United Kingdom
United States
Australia
1 November 2010
February 9, 2010
TBA

Mickey Mouse Clubhouse – Mickey and Pluto to the Rescue
Set Details
Special Features
Episodes
- English (Stereo)
- Handy Manny - "Ice Cream Team" (Season 1, episode 24b)
- Episode 61 – "Pluto To The Rescue"
- Episode 5 – "Pluto's Ball"
- Episode 55 – "Pluto's Playmate"
Release Dates
United Kingdom
United States
Australia
1 March 2010
TBA
TBA

Mickey Mouse Clubhouse – Mickey's Color Adventure
Set Details
Special Features
Episodes
- English (Stereo)
- Little Einsteins - "The Blue-Footed Booby Bird Ballet" (Season 2, episode 15)
- Game Time (Levels 1 & 2)
- Episode 23 – "Mickey's Color Adventure"
- Episode 54 – "Minnie's Rainbow"
- Episode 46 – "Mickey's Art Show"
Release Dates
United Kingdom
United States
Australia
12 April 2010
TBA
TBA

Mickey Mouse Clubhouse – Mickey's Message from Mars
Set Details
Special Features
Episodes
- English (Stereo)
- Handy Manny - "Abuelito's Telescope" (Season 2, episode 19a)
- Episode 63 – "Mickey's Message from Mars"
- Episode 44 – "Mickey's Comet"
- Episode 50 – "Space Captain Donald"
Release Dates
United Kingdom
United States
Australia
9 August 2010
TBA
TBA

Mickey Mouse Clubhouse – Road Rally
Set Details
Special Features
Episodes
- English (Stereo) and French (Stereo)
- Game Time - "Discovery Mode" (Levels 1 & 2)
- Episode 76 - "Road Rally"
- Episode 82 - "Pluto Lends a Paw"
Release Dates
United Kingdom
United States
Australia
September 20, 2012
September 7, 2010
TBA

Mickey Mouse Clubhouse – Mickey's Number Roundup
Set Details
Special Features
Episodes
- English (Stereo) and French (Stereo)
- Discovery Mode with the Mickey Mote edition
- Episode 37 – "Mickey's Round-up"
- Episode 1 – "Daisy Bo-Peep"
- Episode 67 – "Mickey's Big Surprise"
- Episode 70 - "Super Goof's Super Puzzle"
Release Dates
United Kingdom
United States
Australia
TBA
November 16, 2010
TBA

Mickey Mouse Clubhouse – Minnie's Masquerade
Set Details
Special Features
Episodes
- English (Stereo) and French (Stereo)

Discovery Mode with the Mickey Mote edition

- Episode 93 – "Minnie's Masquerade"
- Episode 71 – "Minnie's Mouseke-calendar"
- Episode 2 – "A Surprise for Minnie"
- Episode 51 – "Secret Spy Daisy"
- Episode 59 – "The Friendship Team"
Release Dates
United Kingdom
United States
Australia
TBA
February 8, 2011
TBA

Disney Junior Surprise Party
Set Details
Special Features
Episodes
- English (Stereo) and French (Stereo)
- Handy Manny – "Happy Birthday Mr. Lopart" (Season 2, episode 16a)
- Jungle Junction – "Zooter's Surprise" (Season 1, episode 6b)
- Special Agent Oso – "Three Wheels are not Enough" (Season 1, episode 6a)
- Episode 59 – The Friendship Team
Release Dates
United Kingdom
United States
Australia
May 9, 2011
TBA
TBA

Mickey Mouse Clubhouse – Mickey's Great Outdoors
Set Details
Special Features
Episodes
- English (Stereo) and French (Stereo)

Discovery Mode with the Mickey Mote edition

- Episode 78 – "Mickey's Fishy Story"
- Episode 45 – "Mickey's Camp-Out"
- Episode 42 – "Mickey and Minnie's Jungle Safari"
- Episode 16 – "Daisy in the Sky"
- Episode 78 – "Daisy's Grasshopper"
Release Dates
United Kingdom
United States
Australia
1 August 2011
May 24, 2011
TBA

Mickey Mouse Clubhouse – Mickey's and Donald's Big Balloon Race
Set Details
Special Features
Episodes
- English (Stereo)
- Handy Manny - "Learning to Fly" (Season 2, episode 21a)
- Episode 4 - "Donald's Big Balloon Race"
- Episode 16 - "Pluto's Best"
- Episode 32 - "Goofy in Training"
Release Dates
United Kingdom
United States
Australia
31 October 2011
TBA
TBA

Mickey Mouse Clubhouse – Space Adventure
Set Details
Special Features
Episodes
- English (Stereo) and French (Stereo)
- Game Time - "Discovery Mode" (Levels 1 & 2)
- Episode 79 – "Space Adventure"
- Episode 94 - "Goofy's Thinking Cap"
Release Dates
United Kingdom
United States
Australia
7 November 2011
November 8, 2011
TBA

Mickey Mouse Clubhouse – I Heart Minnie
Set Details
Special Features
Episodes
- English (Stereo), French (Stereo) and Spanish (Stereo)
- An invitation to Minnie's birthday party (Link)
- Episode 8 - "Minnie's Birthday"
- Episode 11 - "Daisy's Dance"
- Episode 40 - "Daisy's Pet Project"
- Episode 53 - "Minnie's Rainbow"
- Episode 95 - "Minnie and Daisy's Flower Shower"
Release Dates
United Kingdom
United States
Australia
6 February 2012
February 7, 2012
Mickey Mouse Clubhouse: Minnie-Rella
