= A2 Televizija =

Macedonian television network

A2 TV
- Country: North Macedonia
- Broadcast area: North Macedonia
- Affiliates: A1

Programming
- Language: Macedonian
- Picture format: 4:3 (576i, SDTV)

Ownership
- Owner: Velija Ramkovski
- Sister channels: A1 Televizija

History
- Launched: 2 July 2008 (original); 23 May 2025 (relaunch)
- Closed: 13 June 2012 (original)

A2 Televizija (Macedonian: А2 телевизија) or just A2 is a television channel in North Macedonia. The channel was the sister outlet to A1 and operated from 2008 to 2012, returning in 2025.

== History ==
A2 started broadcasting in July 2008. In December 2009, the channel held a series of debates countering Večer's pro-government viewpoint.

Following the bankruptcy of sister channel A1, which shut down on 31 July 2011, A2 entered into a process of liquidation. Doncho Nakov suggested its closure and, since 24 August, the debtor or A2 was forbidden from alienating its assets. The brother of Fijat Canovski, with relations to A1 owner Velija Ramkovski, paid the debt. The decision to close A2 was delayed by the Skopje court on 17 October 2011, as the station's lawyer refused to sign the minutes of the hearing.

On 18 May 2012, the Broadcasting Council gave A2 a seven-day deadline to either continue broadcasting or to revoke its license. The regulator's hearings noted that 90% of the channel's schedule at the time consisted of music videos and that none of the programmes shown were educational or informative in nature. This monitoring coincided with the start of a new current affairs programme on A2 which was meant to break the mould of the existing channels, whose primetime schedules were plagued by either news or Turkish series. If A2's existing frequencies were withdrawn per orders of the regulator, there was the chance of restarting the project on satellite. The channel's license was revoked on 13 June 2012, as the channel did not meet SRD regulations: 75,68% of its programming was entertainment, and two-thirds of the figure was repeats.

On 23 May 2025, A2 restarted its broadcasts, however limiting itself to social media profiles on Facebook and Instagram. This coincided with the return of Velija Ramkosvki to the media landscape.
