= Mickey Mouse Clubhouse =

American children's television series

- Genre: Comedy; Adventure; Fantasy; Preschool; Educational
- Based on: Mickey Mouse & Friends by Walt Disney; Ub Iwerks
- Developed by: Bobs Gannaway
- Voices of: Wayne Allwine (seasons 1–3); Bret Iwan (season 4); Russi Taylor; Tony Anselmo; Tress MacNeille; Bill Farmer; Will Ryan; April Winchell; Jim Cummings; Dee Bradley Baker; Frank Welker; Rob Paulsen; Corey Burton
- Opening theme: "Mickey Mouse Clubhouse Theme Song" sung by They Might Be Giants
- Ending theme: "Hot Dog!" sung by They Might Be Giants
- Composers: Mike Himelstein & Michael Turner; Michael Rubin (The Mouskedoer Song)
- Country of origin: United States
- Original language: English
- No. of seasons: 4
- No. of episodes: 125 (list of episodes)

Production
- Executive producers: Bobs Gannaway (season 1); Rob LaDuca (seasons 2–4)
- Producers: Leslie Valdes (season 1); Mark Seidenberg (seasons 2–4)
- Running time: 24 minutes (standard); 30 minutes (8 episodes) (Note: "Mickey and Donald Have a Farm", "Quest for the Crystal Mickey", "Minnie's Pet Salon", "Minnie-rella", "Around the Clubhouse World", "Mickey's Mousekedoer Adventure", "Pop Star Minnie" and "Mickey's Sport-Y-Thon"); 47-49 minutes (most specials); 53 minutes ("The Wizard of Dizz!")
- Production company: Disney Television Animation (Note: Known as Walt Disney Television Animation from 2006 to 2012. Animation outsourced to Toon City (pilot), DQ Entertainment, and Wang Film Productions (eight episodes in Season 4).)

Original release
- Network: Disney Channel (Playhouse Disney/Disney Junior)
- Release: May 5, 2006 – November 6, 2016

Related
- Minnie's Bow-Toons (2011–present); Mickey Mouse Mixed-Up Adventures (2017–2021); Mickey Mouse Funhouse (2021–2025); Mickey Mouse Clubhouse+ (2025–present)

Mickey Mouse Clubhouse is an American animated interactive children's television series for preschoolers. Produced by Disney Television Animation, the series was created by Disney veteran Bobs Gannaway. The series originally aired 125 episodes from May 5, 2006, to November 6, 2016, on Disney Channel's preschool block, Playhouse Disney (later known as Disney Jr.), making it the longest-running original series on the block by original broadcast run, as well as the second longest by episode count after Doc McStuffins. It received positive reviews from critics.

On August 18, 2023, a reboot of the series, Mickey Mouse Clubhouse+, was revealed to be in production, and premiered on July 21, 2025 on Disney Jr. and on Disney+.

== Premise ==
Mickey, Minnie, Donald, Daisy, Goofy, and Pluto interact with the viewer(s) to stimulate problem solving during a self-contained story.

Once the episode's situation has been explained, Mickey invites the viewer(s) to join him at the Mousekedoer, a giant Mickey-head-shaped computer whose main function is to distribute the day's Mouseketools, a collection of tools needed to reach the episode's main goal, to Mickey. One of them is a "Mystery Mouseketool" represented by a question mark, which is hidden from the viewer until it is selected, and thus changes into the Mouseketool the viewers get to use.

After all of the Mouseketools have been revealed, they are quickly downloaded to Toodles, a small, Mickey-head-shaped flying extension of the Mousekedoer. By calling "Oh, Toodles!", he pops up from where he is hiding and flies up to the screen so the viewer(s) can pick which tool is needed for the current situation.

The show features two original songs performed by American alternative rock band They Might Be Giants; the opening theme song, in which a variant of a Mickey Mouse Club chant ("Meeska Mooska Mickey Mouse!") is used to summon the Clubhouse, and "Hot Dog!", which echoes Mickey's first spoken words in the 1929 short The Karnival Kid.

After the show ended in 2016, it was succeeded by Mickey Mouse Mixed-Up Adventures (formerly Mickey Mouse Roadster Racers), which ran from January 2017 to October 2021, and Mickey Mouse Funhouse, which ran from July 2021 to April 2025. On August 18, 2023, a revival was revealed to be in production, and premiered on July 21, 2025.

== Episodes ==
Season	Episodes		Originally released		
Season	Episodes		First released	Last released	Network
Pilot			November 15, 2005		N/A
1	27		May 5, 2006	July 27, 2007	Playhouse Disney
2	40		January 26, 2008	February 20, 2010	Playhouse Disney
3	32	14	February 27, 2010	January 3, 2011	Playhouse Disney
3	32	18	February 14, 2011	September 28, 2012	Disney Junior
4	26		November 5, 2012	November 6, 2016	Disney Junior

== Characters ==
=== Main ===
- Mickey Mouse (voiced by Wayne Allwine in Seasons 1–3 and Bret Iwan in Season 4): The optimistic and easygoing leader of The Sensational Six. He is very patient and caring, especially towards his pet dog Pluto. He is Minnie's boyfriend.
- Minnie Mouse (voiced by Russi Taylor): Mickey Mouse's loving and quick-thinking girlfriend and Daisy's best friend who loves bows. She is often prone to being put in over-the-top experiences.
- Donald Duck (voiced by Tony Anselmo): Mickey's short-tempered but good-natured best friend, Daisy's boyfriend and co-leader of The Sensational Six. He is often shown to display a short temper that is easily provoked, though the series somewhat downplays this in favor of highlighting his impulsiveness and propensity for unintentional accidents.
- Daisy Duck (voiced by Tress MacNeille): Donald's girlfriend and Minnie's best friend, who is prone to getting distracted and being talkative. However, she does mean well, and she also knows how to solve many problems and mysteries.
- Goofy (voiced by Bill Farmer): Mickey's innocent but well-meaning best friend. Being the clumsy guy he is, Goofy is often the source of most of the slapstick presented in this series.
- Pluto (vocal effects provided by Bill Farmer): Mickey's best pet dog who loves adventure. His arch-nemesis is Butch the Bulldog, whose owner is revealed to be Pete.
- Toodles (voiced by Rob Paulsen): A tool-distributing robot that Mickey calls to the Mouseketools for every episode. In Season 3, he gains a face, a personality, and a voice.

=== Recurring ===
- Pete (voiced by Jim Cummings): A friend and foe of Mickey's. In many episodes, he dons an alter-ego and tries to foil whatever plans Mickey and his friends have. He's more mischievous and playful and less malicious.
- Clarabelle Cow (voiced by April Winchell): A cow who runs the Moo Mart, a local supermarket. She also runs a nursery show as Mother Goose Clarabelle.
- Ludwig Von Drake (voiced by Corey Burton): A genius inventor who creates many gadgets for Mickey and his friends to use, though some of them backfire.
- Chip (voiced by Tress MacNeille) and Dale (voiced by Tress MacNeille in "Daisy Bo Peep" and Corey Burton afterwards): A pair of chipmunks who love digging holes and eating nuts.
- Willie the Giant (voiced by Will Ryan): A giant who lives on a barn in the clouds. He was portrayed as more antagonistic and bad in Season 1, but was made friendlier and great for Season 2, 3, and 4.
- Martian Mickey (voiced by Wayne Allwine in Seasons 2-3 and Bret Iwan in Season 4): Mickey's alien counterpart from Mars.
- Martian Minnie (voiced by Russi Taylor): Minnie's alien counterpart from Mars.
- Pluto From Pluto (voiced by Bill Farmer): Pluto's counterpart that is originally from Pluto but is now Martian Mickey's pet. Unlike Pluto, he mainly communicates by making warbling sounds with his tail rather than barking.
- Goofbot (voiced by Bill Farmer): A robot counterpart of Goofy that was built by him.
- Santa Claus and Mrs. Claus (voiced by Dee Bradley Baker and Tress MacNeille, respectively): Santa is a jolly old man who, along with his wife, Mrs. Claus, visits Mickey and his friends every Christmas Day. They also appeared in the special "Choo Choo Express."
- Baby Red Bird and Mommy Red Bird (vocal effects both provided by Tress MacNeille): Baby Red Bird was born on a nest that Goofy mistaken for a hat. He usually "tweets" in threes, and was later returned to his mother who has the same tweeting pattern.
- Boo Boo Chicken and Coco the Monkey (vocal effects both provided by Dee Bradley Baker): Boo Boo Chicken is Donald's pet chicken. Coco the Monkey is Goofy's monkey friend from the jungle.
- Figaro, Butch the Bulldog, Mr. Pettibone, and Bella (vocal effects all provided by Frank Welker): Figaro and Mr. Pettibone are the respective cats of Minnie and Goofy, while Butch and Bella are the respective dogs of Pete and Clarabelle.
- Quoodles (voiced by Russi Taylor): Toodles' female counterpart and love interest. She originally worked for Space Pirate Pete but now acts as Minnie's assistant and gives her Quoodlestools whenever Toodles is busy with Mickey.

=== Guests ===
- Mortimer Mouse (voiced by Maurice LaMarche): A mouse who was originally a supervillain known as Mega Mort.
- Captain Goof-Beard (voiced by Dick Van Dyke): A pirate and Goofy's grandfather who lives on Harmony Chord Island.
- Millie and Melody Mouse (voiced by Avalon Robbins and Grace Kaufman, respectively): Minnie Mouse's nieces.
- The Singing Lock (voiced by Nika Futterman): A lock that appears on the front door as a result of the Silly Switch in "Mickey's Silly Problem".
- Count Mickula (voiced by Bret Iwan): A vampire counterpart of Mickey. He can fly and turn into a bat.
- Boodles (voiced by Chloë Grace Moretz): Toodles' counterpart from Count Mikula's castle who gives Monster Mousketools. She likes to scare people when she is called.
- Igor the Door (voiced by David Tennant): A talking door knocker who operates the front door to Count Mikula's castle.
- Cuckoo the Cuckoo Bird (vocal effects provided by Dee Bradley Baker): A cuckoo bird that escapes his clock, prompting Mickey and Donald to chase after him.
- Goofles (voiced by Bill Farmer): Toodles' cousin who resembles and behaves like Goofy. Toodles is able to transfer his Mouseketools to him.

== Production ==
Mickey Mouse was originally voiced by Wayne Allwine, who died in 2009, upon which Bret Iwan took over the role (the last episode to feature Allwine as Mickey premiered posthumously on September 28, 2012). Bill Farmer, the voice actor for Goofy and Pluto, said in February 2014 that the recording of dialogue for new episodes has ceased, but that "it would be quite a while before the show runs out of new episodes for TV. We have been on the air consistently since 2006 and we started recording in 2004. So there is always a long lead-in time between recording and seeing it on TV. So don't worry more is still to come, we just are not making any more". The last episode aired in 2016.

== Release ==
=== Broadcast ===
Since Mickey Mouse Clubhouse has ended its run, reruns continue to air on Disney Jr. The series is available to stream on Disney+.

=== Home media ===
Home media is distributed by Walt Disney Studios Home Entertainment.

Title	Season(s)	Episode count	Release date	Episodes
Mickey's Treasure Hunt	1	3	June 5, 2006	Episode 02 ("A Surprise for Minnie"), 06 ("Mickey Goes Fishing"), and 13 ("Mickey's Treasure Hunt")
Mickey's Great Clubhouse Hunt	1	4	April 3, 2007	15 ("Daisy in the Sky), 17 ("Mickey's Treat), 18 ("Minnie Red Riding Hood), and 24 ("Mickey's Great Clubhouse Hunt")
Mickey Saves Santa	1	3	August 28, 2007	20 ("Mickey Saves Santa"), 21 ("Goofy the Great"), and 22 ("Mickey's Color Adventure")
Mickey's Storybook Surprises	1, 2	4	September 2, 2008	Episode 07 ("Donald the Frog Prince"), 18 ("Minnie Red Riding Hood"), 19 ("Sleeping Minnie"), and 50 ("Minnie's Mystery")
Mickey's Big Splash	1, 2	4	May 5, 2009	Episode 06 ("Mickey Goes Fishing"), 43 ("Pluto's Bubble Bath"), 57 ("Pete's Beach Blanket Luau"), and 58 ("Donald's Ducks")
Mickey's Adventures in Wonderland	2	2	September 8, 2009	Episode 64 ("Goofy Goes Goofy") and 65 ("Mickey's Adventures In Wonderland")
Choo-Choo Express	2	2	December 1, 2009	41 ("Mickey's Big Job") and 60 ("Choo-Choo Express")
Minnie's Bow-Tique	2, 3	4	February 9, 2010	32 ("Minnie's Picnic"), 61 ("Minnie's Bee Story"), 75 ("Minnie's Pajama Party"), and 83 ("Minnie's Bow-Tique")
Road Rally	1–3	5	September 7, 2010	16 ("Pluto's best") 32 ("Goofy in training") 62 ("Pluto's playmate") 76 ("Road Rally") and 82 ("Pluto Lends A Paw")
Numbers Round-Up	1–3	5	November 16, 2010	Episode 01 ("Daisy Bo-Peep"), 42 ("Mickey's Round-Up"), 67 ("Mickey's Big Surprise"), 70 ("Super Goof's Super Puzzle"), and 87 ("Mickey's Show and Tell")
Minnie's Masquerade	1–3	5	February 8, 2011	Episode 02 ("A Surprise For Minnie"), Episode 47 ("Secret Spy Daisy"), 55 ("The Friendship Team"), 81 ("Minnie's Mouseke-Calendar"), and 84 ("Minnie's Masquerade")
Mickey's Great Outdoors	1–3	5	May 24, 2011	14 ("Daisy in the Sky"), 38 ("Mickey and Minnie's Jungle Safari"), 39 ("Mickey's Camp Out"), 78 ("Daisy's Grasshopper"), and 88 ("Mickey's Fishy Story")
Space Adventure	1–3	5	November 8, 2011	25 ("Doctor Daisy M.D") 51 ("Mickey’s Comet") 73 ("Goofy’s magical mix-up") 89 ("Space Adventure") and 94 ("Goofy's Thinking Cap")
I Heart Minnie	1–3	5	February 7, 2012	8 ("Minnie's Birthday"), Episode 11 ("Daisy's Dance"), 40 ("Daisy's Pet Project"), 53 ("Minnie's Rainbow"), and 95 ("Minnie and Daisy's Flower Shower")
Mickey and Donald Have a Farm	1–4	5	December 11, 2012	23 ("Goofy's Petting Zoo"), 29 ("Goofy the Homemaker"), 52 ("Clarabelle's Clubhouse Mooo-sical"), 98 ("Donald Hatches an Egg"), and 100 ("Mickey and Donald Have a Farm")
Quest for the Crystal Mickey	2–4	5	May 21, 2013	59 ("Goofy's Coconutty Monkey"), 71 ("Donald of the Desert"), 77 ("Donald the Genie"), 85 ("Goofy's Giant Adventure"), and 101 ("Quest For the Crystal Mickey")
Minnie's the Wizard of Dizz	3, 4	4	June 11, 2013	69 ("Mickey's Springtime Surprise") 91 ("Goofy's Gone"), 99 ("The Golden Boo Boo"), and 104 ("The Wizard of Dizz!")
Super Adventure!	3, 4	4	December 3, 2013	79 ("Mickey's Mousekersize"), 80 ("Mickey's Little Parade"), 97 ("Aye, Aye, Captain Mickey"), and 105 ("Super Adventure")
Minnie-Rella	2–4	4	February 11, 2014	63 ("Mickey and the Enchanted Egg"), 93 ("Pluto's Tale"), 102 ("Daisy's Pony Tale"), and 108 ("Minnie-rella")
Around the Clubhouse World	1-4	5	May 20, 2014	05 ("Donald and the Beanstalk"),09 ("Goofy on Mars"), 30 ("Mickey's Handy Helpers") 74 ("Pluto's Dinosaur Romp"), and 115 ("Around the Clubhouse World")
Minnie's Winter Bow Show	4	4	November 18, 2014	111 ("Sea Captain Mickey"), 114 ("Minnie's Winter Bow Show"), 121 ("Chef Goofy On The Go"), and 124 ("Martian Minnie's Tea Party")
Minnie's Pet Salon	1–4	5	May 19, 2015	15 ("Pluto's Puppy-Sitting Adventure"), 40 ("Daisy's Pet Project"), 58 ("Donald's Ducks"), 82 ("Pluto Lends a Paw") and 107 ("Minnie's Pet Salon")
Mickey's Monster Musical	4	3	September 8, 2015	103 ("Mickey's Farm Fun Fair"), 112 ("Mickey's Pirate Adventure"), and 119 ("Mickey's Monster Musical")
Pop Star Minnie	2–4	5	February 2, 2016	35 ("Mickey's Big Band Concert"), 81 ("Minnie's Mouseke-Calendar"), 95 ("Minnie and Daisy's Flower Shower"), 109 ("Mickey's Clubhouse Rocks") and 120 ("Pop Star Minnie")
Mickey's Sport-Y-Thon	4	6	May 24, 2016	106 ("Mickey's Mystery"), 113 ("Mickey's Happy Mousekeday"), 116 ("Mickey's Mousekeball"), 117 ("Donald's Brand New Clubhouse"), 118 ("Mickey's Mousekedoer Adventure") and 123 ("Mickey's Sport-Y-Thon")
Disney Junior Holiday	1-4	4	October 23, 2018	20 ("Mickey Saves Santa") 48 ("Pluto To the Rescue") 60 ("Choo-choo express") and 114 ("Minnie’s winter bow show")

== Reception ==
=== Critical response ===
Alessandra Stanley of The New York Times compared Mickey Mouse Clubhouse to Wonder Pets!, stating it is simpler and noting that "sometimes less is more." She found the role of Mickey Mouse to be more didactic, akin to Mister Rogers. Larisa Wiseman of Common Sense Media rated the show three out of five stars, noting its educational value, particularly its focus on early math skills, and acknowledged the positive messages centered on teamwork and social interactions. Stuart Heritage of The Guardian included the series in the "Best Shows to Watch on Disney+,” stating preschoolers will enthusiastically engage, while older audiences may be less interested.

Charles Curtis of USA Today ranked Mickey Mouse Clubhouse 9th on the "20 Best Shows for Kids Right Now" list, asserting, "Whether it's Mickey Mouse Clubhouse, Mickey and the Roadster Racers or Mickey Mouse Mixed-Up Adventures, they're all good." Time Out placed it 24th in their "The Best Kids TV Shows" list, noting that the show gives classic Disney characters like Mickey, Minnie, Donald, and Goofy a modern "upgrade" with bright, computer-animated visuals. They praised the series for engaging young viewers with challenges that promote basic problem-solving and math skills, and said the catchy theme and ending songs are sure to have kids singing along.

Matthew Huff of BuzzFeed ranked the show 28th in the "51 Best TV Shows to Stream on Disney+," calling it "oddly enthralling." Nathan Rabin of Fatherly ranked it 60th in the "100 Best Kids TV Shows of All Time," describing it as a colorful, music-filled, and educational romp with catchy songs by They Might Be Giants.

David Perlmutter in The Encyclopedia of American Animated Television Shows says that the show "was yet another case of vintage cartoon characters embarrassing themselves for the enjoyment of preschoolers in a heavily dumbed-down format. While it demonstrated the wide appeal of the Disney brand, it also indicated that this brand could be compromised as any other could through association with an inferior product."

==== Popularity ====
Market research company Parrot Analytics, which looks at consumer engagement in consumer research, streaming, downloads, and on social media, reported that Mickey Mouse Clubhouse ranked among the top ten most in-demand preschool shows globally in 2021, with a demand 12.06 times higher than the average preschool show. The series accumulated over four billion views on YouTube in 2023, with its popular "Hot Dog Dance" video being the second most-viewed video on the Disney Junior UK channel, which boasts 11.3 million subscribers. In a 2023 survey conducted by LittleSleepies.com, which involved 1,000 parents in the United States, the series emerged as the most popular children's television show, with over 25% of parents reporting enjoyment in watching it. The show was ranked as the second most educational program, following Ms. Rachel's Songs for Littles. Many parents noted that the blend of entertainment and educational content resonates with their children. Furthermore, the series ranked as the second favorite show among children.

Mickey Mouse Clubhouse ranked as the No. 6 most-watched preschool series across both linear and streaming platforms in 2024. Disney Jr. reached 21 million YouTube subscribers and amassed over 21 billion views on the platform, surpassing Nick Jr. and Netflix Jr. Mickey Mouse Clubhouse was part of Disney Jr.'s success, contributing to the network's position as the No. 1 cable network for kids 2-5 for the third year in a row. Luminate, which gathers viewership data from some smart TVs in the U.S., reported that Mickey Mouse Clubhouse amassed 4.66 billion minutes of watch time across its four seasons on Disney+ and YouTube between January 3 and April 25, 2025, making it one of the most-watched children’s programs in the country during that period. Season 1 alone accounted for 2.6 billion minutes—tied with Ms. Rachel for the top spot—while Seasons 2, 4, and 3 followed with 830 million, 700 million, and 533 million minutes, respectively. In December 2025, Disney announced that Mickey Mouse Clubhouse was among the television series to surpass one billion hours streamed on Disney+ in 2025. Mickey Mouse Clubhouse and Mickey Mouse Clubhouse+ accumulated a combined 20.3 billion minutes of viewing across linear television and streaming platforms between September 22, 2025, and September 20, 2026, ranking as the twelfth most-watched animated series during that period.

=== Accolades ===
Year	Award	Category	Recipient(s) and nominee(s)	Result	Ref.
2010	Annie Awards	Best Animated Television Production for Children	Mickey Mouse Clubhouse	Nominated	
2011	Daytime Emmy Awards	Outstanding Pre-School Children's Series	Mickey Mouse Clubhouse	Nominated	
2011	Daytime Emmy Awards	Outstanding Performer in an Animated Program	Bill Farmer: For the voice of Goofy	Nominated	
2011	Daytime Emmy Awards	Outstanding Music Direction and Composition	Mike Himelstein, Michael Turner	Nominated	
2012	Annie Awards	Best Animated Television Production - Preschool	Mickey Mouse Clubhouse	Nominated	
2013	iKids Awards	Best Web/App Series	Mickey Mouse Clubhouse: For the Disney Junior Appisodes adaptation of "Road Rally"	Won	
2013	Behind the Voice Actors Awards	Best Vocal Ensemble in a Television Series - Children's/Educational	Bret Iwan, Tony Anselmo, Bill Farmer, Russi Taylor, Tress MacNeille, Jim Cummings, Corey Burton, April, Winchell, Dee Bradley Baker, Will Ryan	Won	
2014	Behind the Voice Actors Awards	Best Vocal Ensemble in a Television Series - Children's/Educational	Bret Iwan, Tony Anselmo, Bill Farmer, Russi Taylor, Tress MacNeille, Jim Cummings, Corey Burton, April, Winchell, Dee Bradley Baker, Will Ryan	Nominated	
2014	Behind the Voice Actors Awards	Best Female Vocal Performance in a Television Series - Children's/Educational	Russi Taylor: For the voice of Minnie Mouse	Nominated	
2014	Behind the Voice Actors Awards	Best Female Vocal Performance in a Television Series - Children's/Educational	April Winchell: For the voice of Clarabelle Cow	Nominated	
2014	Behind the Voice Actors Awards	Best Male Vocal Performance in a Television Series - Children's/Educational	Bill Farmer: For the voice of Goofy	Nominated	
2014	Behind the Voice Actors Awards	Best Male Vocal Performance in a Television Series - Children's/Educational	Tony Anselmo: For the voice of Donald Duck	Nominated	
2015	Daytime Creative Arts Emmy Awards	Outstanding Performer in an Animated Program	Dick Van Dyke: For the voice of Captain Goof Beard	Nominated	

== In other media ==
=== Spin-off ===
Minnie's Bow-Toons is a spin-off series that premiered in November 2011 on Disney Jr. The show is based on the Mickey Mouse Clubhouse episode "Minnie's Bow-tique" and follows Minnie Mouse's adventures as the owner of a bow-making store, where she creates and sells bows for clothing and home decor with her friend Daisy Duck. The show originally ran from 2011 to 2016, but was revived in April 2021 and has been airing new episodes since, featuring the world and animation style of Mickey Mouse Mixed-Up Adventures.

=== Reboot ===
On August 18, 2023, it was announced that a reboot was in production, under the working title Mickey Mouse Clubhouse 2.0. It premiered on Disney Jr. and Disney+ under the name Mickey Mouse Clubhouse+ on July 21, 2025. Most of the cast returns to reprise their character roles. Kaitlyn Robrock and Brock Powell replace the roles of Russi Taylor and Will Ryan, due to their deaths on July 26, 2019, and November 19, 2021, respectively.
