= Macedonian Idol =

Macedonian talent show

- Македонски идол
- Created by: Simon Fuller
- Judges: Kaliopi Bukle; Igor Džambazov; Toni Mihajlovski
- Country of origin: Macedonia
- No. of seasons: 1

Original release
- Network: A1 TV
- Release: 13 November 2010 – 30 May 2011

Macedonian Idol (Macedonian: Македонски идол, romanized: Makedonski idol) is a Macedonian talent show airing on A1 TV, based on the British show Pop Idol. The auditions for the first season started in 2010 and the series premiered on 13 November. It is hosted by Ivanna Hadžievska and Nenad Gjeorgjievski.

== Season 1 ==
Auditions started in summer 2010 in ten different cities of Macedonia: Ohrid, Kavadarci, Strumica, Veles, Štip, Kumanovo, Skopje, Bitola, Tetovo and Prilep.
