= List of Mira, Royal Detective episodes =

Mira, Royal Detective is an American animated mystery children's television series produced by Wild Canary Animation, inspired by Indian culture and customs, and featuring the "first South Asian protagonist" in a Disney Junior show. It premiered on Disney Junior in the United States on March 20, 2020. The second and final season premiered on April 5, 2021 on Disney Junior and DisneyNOW.

== Series overview ==
Season	Segments	Episodes	Originally released	
Season	Segments	Episodes	First released	Last released
1	50	25	March 20, 2020	March 27, 2021
2	54	29	April 5, 2021	June 20, 2022

== Episodes ==
=== Season 1 (2020-21) ===
No. overall	No. in season	Title	Directed by	Written by	Storyboards by	Original release date	Prod. code	U.S. viewers (millions)
1	1	"The Case of the Royal Scarf"	Robert F. Hughes & Francis Glebas Joseph S. Scott	Becca Topol Lisa Kettle	Kurt Anderson (episode); Wendy Grieb (song) Chris Harmon	March 20, 2020	101	0.58
1	1	"The Case of the Missing Bicycle"	Robert F. Hughes & Francis Glebas Joseph S. Scott	Becca Topol Lisa Kettle	Kurt Anderson (episode); Wendy Grieb (song) Chris Harmon	March 20, 2020	101	0.58
"The Case of the Royal Scarf": When Priya's scarf for Queen Shanti goes missing, Mira has to help her find it.: Song: "Gotta Find That Scarf"; "The Case of the Missing Bicycle": Mira must find a missing bike while also watching her baby cousin.
2a	2a	"Mystery at the Puppet Show"	Robert F. Hughes and Francis Glebas	S : Sascha Paladino; S/T : Robyn Brown	Lisa Dosson (episode); Wendy Grieb (song)	March 20, 2020	103 V102	0.60
Mikku and Chikku go undercover as puppets for a puppet show to help Mira track down a thief. Song: "The Puppet Trail"
2b	2b	"The Mystery of the New Kid"	Melissa Suber	Geetika Lizardi	Santosh G. Oommen and Kevin Pawlak	March 20, 2020	103 V102	0.60
When a new kid in Jalpur is accused of stealing an earring, Mira must find out the truth.
3a	3a	"The Case of the Dance Off Disaster"	Robert F. Hughes and Francis Glebas	S : Robyn Brown; T : Kerri Grant	Kurt Anderson (episode); Wendy Grieb (song)	March 27, 2020	107 V103	0.43
Someone starts sabotaging the acts at the dance contest, and Mira must find out who it is. Song: "Be the Music"
3b	3b	"Mystery at the Camel Fair"	Joseph S. Scott	S : Robyn Brown; T : Shilpa Agarwal	Lisa Dosson	March 27, 2020	107 V103	0.43
Mira must investigate the camel fair when the decorations for Priya and Meena's entry go missing.
4a	4a	"The Undercover Princess Mystery"	Francis Glebas and Robert F. Hughes	S : Geetika Lizardi; T : Amy Keating Rogers	Traci Honda (episode); Wendy Grieb (song)	April 3, 2020	112	0.49
Mira and Priya go undercover as princesses to find the royal gem of Jalpur. Song: "The Royal Way"
4b	4b	"Mystery at the Fashion Show"	Melissa Suber	Geetika Lizardi	Becky Cassady, Kevin Pawlak, Sia Mistry, and Julian Chaney	April 3, 2020	112	0.49
Mira must search for her special dress for a fashion show when it goes missing.
5a	5a	"The Case of the Wrecked Recital"	Melissa Suber	T : Becca Topol; S/T : Robyn Brown	Becky Cassady (episode); Wendy Grieb (song)	April 10, 2020	105	0.45
Neel's sitar vanishes and Mira must help him find it before Great Aunt Rupa finds out. Song: "Play Us Your Song"
5b	5b	"The Case of the Vanishing Vessels"	Joseph S. Scott	S : Sascha Paladino; S/T : Lisa Kettle	Chris Harmon	April 10, 2020	105	0.45
A missing toy boat mystery takes Mira on an underground adventure.
6a	6a	"The Mongoose Cousin Mystery"	Melissa Suber	Geetika Lizardi	Robert Sledge	April 17, 2020	111	0.36
Mikku and Chikku's cousins visit for a kite festival, but when their kite goes missing, Mira must help them find it.
6b	6b	"The Marble Egg Mystery"	Joseph S. Scott	Geetika Lizardi	Christian Lignan	April 17, 2020	111	0.36
Mira is tasked by Veer to search for his prized marble egg to the queen.
7a	7a	"The Case of the Secret Gift-Giver"	Joseph S. Scott	Lisa Kettle	Christian Lignan (episode); Wendy Grieb (song)	April 24, 2020	108	0.52
On Shanti's birthday, a mysterious stranger is giving the citizens gifts and Mira must find out who it is. Song: "Who Could it Be?"
7b	7b	"Mystery at the Cooking Contest"	Melissa Suber	Geetika Lizardi	Traci Honda and Julian Chaney	April 24, 2020	108	0.52
During the queen's cooking contest, Kamala's entry is sabotaged when her rice mysteriously goes missing.
8a	8a	"The Mysterious Polo Player"	Robert F. Hughes and Francis Glebas	Geetika Lizardi and Becca Topol	Traci Honda (episode); Wendy Grieb (song)	May 1, 2020	109	0.41
A mysterious polo player shows up while Mira and her team are practicing and seems to help them win. Song: "The Boy We're Looking For"
8b	8b	"The Case of the Secret Treasure"	Melissa Suber	S : Geetika Lizardi and Sascha Paladino; T : Kerri Grant	Becky Cassady	May 1, 2020	109	0.41
Mira, Priya and Neel discover a map that leads them to mysterious tunnels under the palace.
9a	9a	"The Case of the Chiseling Chiselers"	Robert F. Hughes and Francis Glebas	Tim Maile and Douglas Tuber	Kurt Anderson (episode); Wendy Grieb (song)	May 8, 2020	110	0.34
The royal sword goes missing on the day of Veer's birthday. Song: "Happy Birthday Veer"
9b	9b	"A Patchwork Mystery"	Joseph S. Scott	Lisa Kettle	Chris Harmon	May 8, 2020	110	0.34
On Jalpur's 400th birthday, Mira is tasked with finding Priya's special tapestry.
10a	10a	"Mystery at the Marketplace"	Joseph S. Scott	S : Sascha Paladino; S/T : Kerri Grant	Chris Harmon	May 15, 2020	113	0.38
Mira must track down a spice merchant who has a key ingredient for the ladoos she's making. Song: "We're So Glad You're Home"
10b	10b	"Mystery in the Sand Dunes"	Robert F. Hughes and Francis Glebas	Lisa Kettle	Kurt Anderson	May 15, 2020	113	0.38
Neel's new vehicle vanishes in a sandstorm, and Mira must search the desert to find it.
11a	11a	"Mikku and Chikku: Doll Detectives"	Joseph S. Scott	S : Robyn Brown; T : Amy Keating Rogers	Christian Lignan (episode); Wendy Grieb (song)	June 12, 2020	104	0.40
Mikku and Chikku decide to start their own detective case, but Mira must help them when a missing doll mystery falls off the handle. Song: "When We're Detectives"
11b	11b	"The Case of the Moving Day Meddler"	Robert F. Hughes and Francis Glebas	S : Robyn Brown; T : Aminta Goyel	Kurt Anderson	June 12, 2020	104	0.40
Plans for a moving day get interrupted when the tickets go missing.
12a	12a	"The Topsy Turvy Tiffin Mystery"	Joseph S. Scott	Lisa Kettle	Christian Lignan (episode); Wendy Grieb (song)	June 26, 2020	114	0.36
Mikku and Chikku accidentally mix up a tiffin delivery and Mira must fix it. Song: "The Tiffin Song"
12b	12b	"Mystery at the Invention Fair"	Melissa Suber	Kerri Grant	Tamal Hanley	June 26, 2020	114	0.36
An important part of Druv's entry for the invention fair goes missing and Mira must find it before judging.
13a	13a	"The Case of One Angry Chicken"	Francis Glebas	S : Tamra Pica; S/T : Becca Topol	Robert Sledge (episode); Wendy Grieb (song)	July 17, 2020	TBA	0.37
When Drhuv's pocket watch ends up in Raj's coop, Mira must find out how it got there. Song: "Let the Clues Do the Talking"
13b	13b	"A Tiny Tune Mystery"	Melissa Suber	Lisa Kettle	Becky Cassady	July 17, 2020	TBA	0.37
Mikku and Chikku's instruments go missing, and Mira must track them down.
14a	14a	"The Rakhi Mystery"	Melissa Suber	Geetika Lizardi	Tamal Hanley (episode); Wendy Grieb (song)	July 30, 2020	117	0.33
When the bracelets that Mira and her friends made for the Rakhi holiday disappear, Mira sets out to find them before the celebration starts. Song: "Rakhi"
14b	14b	"Mystery Below the Palace"	Joseph S. Scott and Fred Reyes	Lisa Kettle	Christian Lignan and Amie Pantle	July 30, 2020	117	0.33
The palace is being rocked by a mysterious stomping sound, and Mira has to find out where it's coming from.
15a	15a	"The Mystery of the Secret Room"	Francis Glebas	Kerri Grant	Kurt Anderson	August 28, 2020 (Note: This episode premiered in Southeast Asia on August 1, 2020.)	116	0.29
When Mira, Priya and Neel get lost in a secret room at the castle, Mira must follow clues to find the exit.
15b	15b	"The Mystery of the Magnificent Musicians"	Joseph S. Scott	Sascha Paladino	Chris Harmon (episode); Wendy Grieb (song)	August 28, 2020	116	0.29
Instruments start disappearing when mysterious new musicians come to town. Song: "Magnificent"
16a	16a	"A Mystery Fit for a Queen"	Joseph S. Scott and Fred Reyes	Lisa Kettle	Chris Harmon	September 25, 2020	119	0.30
Shanti joins Mira on a case to find her missing jewelry box.
16b	16b	"The Case of Pinky and the Goat"	Francis Glebas	Geetika Lizardi	Kurt Anderson (episode); Wendy Grieb (song)	September 25, 2020	119	0.30
Mira recruits Pinky to help Dhruv find his missing pet goat. Song: "If I Were a Goat"
17a	17a	"A Seedy Mystery"	Melissa Suber	Kerri Grant	Becky Cassady	October 9, 2020	121	0.22
When Mira loses her dad's rocks, it's up to her friends to cheer her up and solve the case. Song: "We're Here"
17b	17b	"Mystery at the Jalpur Games"	Francis Glebas	Geetika Lizardi and Sascha Paladino	Robert Sledge	October 9, 2020	121	0.22
When the archery arrows go missing during the Jalpur Games, Mira sets out to find them.
18a	18a	"Mystery at the Gymnastics Show"	Francis Glebas	S : Becca Topol; T : Geetika Lizardi	Kurt Anderson (episode); Wendy Grieb (song)	October 23, 2020	122	0.23
Mira must find Preeti’s lucky headband when it goes missing right before the gymnastics show. Song: "It's You"
18b	18b	"The Case of the Curious Confetti"	Joseph S. Scott and Fred Reyes	Lisa Kettle	Chris Harmon	October 23, 2020	122	0.23
When confetti starts popping up all over town, Mira searches for the source.
19a	19a	"The Great Diwali Mystery"	Melissa Suber	Geetika Lizardi	Becky Cassady (episode); Wendy Grieb (song)	November 6, 2020	102	0.23
Mira must track down the missing oil used to light traditional lamps throughout the town in order to save the Diwali celebration. Song: "Diwali"
19b	19b	"The Case of the Curious Creature"	Joseph S. Scott	T : Becca Topol; S/T : Robyn Brown	Michael B. Singleton	November 6, 2020	102	0.23
Mira investigates sightings of a legendary creature who is known to be a mischievous shoe thief.
20a	20a	"The Mikku Mystery"	Melissa Suber	Becca Topol	Tamal Hanley (episode); Wendy Grieb (song)	November 20, 2020	123	0.22
Mira and Chikku are on the case to find out what is scaring Mikku. Song: "Talk to Me"
20b	20b	"The Case of the Getaway Goats"	Joseph S. Scott and Fred Reyes	Kerri Grant	Amie Pantle	November 20, 2020	123	0.22
Mira investigates why the goats go missing in Jalpur.
21a	21a	"The Case of the Mysterious Girl"	Melissa Suber	Becca Topol	Becky Cassady	December 4, 2020	124	0.25
When a mysterious girl arrives in Jalpur, Mira sets out on the case to figure out her true identity.
21b	21b	"Mystery on the Waterfront"	Francis Glebas	Kerri Grant and Becca Topol	Kevin Pawlak (episode); Jonathan Peartree (song)	December 4, 2020	124	0.25
Mira must crack the case when Auntie Pushpa’s gold purse and other valuables go missing. Song: "First Class Water Taxi"
22a	22a	"The Case of the Missing Library Book"	Joseph S. Scott and Fred Reyes	S : Kerri Grant and Becca Topol; T : Nayna Agrawal	Christian Lignan and Amie Pantle (episode); Wendy Grieb (song)	January 8, 2021	D120	0.35
Mira must find the missing library book that everyone wants to read. Song: "So Many Books"
22b	22b	"A Double Dosa Mystery"	Melissa Suber	Lisa Kettle	Tamal Hanley	January 8, 2021	D120	0.35
When Sandeep’s dosa goes missing, Mira goes on a stakeout to discover who took it.
23a	23a	"Mira's Birthday Mystery"	Melissa Suber	S : Becca Topol; T : Vidhya Iyer	Becky Cassady	January 29, 2021	D118	0.33
On Mira’s birthday, Queen Shanti asks her to solve a strange mystery.
23b	23b	"The Great Art Mystery"	Francis Glebas	Geetika Lizardi	Robert Sledge (episode); Wendy Grieb (song)	January 29, 2021	D118	0.33
When an anonymous painting appears, Mira searches for the artist so it can be entered in Priya’s art show. Song: "Something Special"
24a	24a	"A Royal Detective Mystery"	Francis Glebas	S : Parvesh Cheena; T : Becca Topol	Kurt Anderson	February 19, 2021	125	0.36
Detective Gupta comes to visit Jalpur and agrees to join Mira in a quest to find a hidden treasure.
24b	24b	"The Mystery of the Missing Crown"	Joseph S. Scott and Fred Reyes	Sascha Paladino	Chris Harmon	February 19, 2021	125	0.36
Queen Shanti leaves town for the day, putting Prince Veer in charge. Will Veer ask for the help of others or will he try and do everything himself?
25a	25a	"The Holi Festival Mystery"	Robert F. Hughes and Francis Glebas	Geetika Lizardi	Michael B. Singleton (episode); Wendy Grieb (song)	March 27, 2021	106	0.42
Mira and her friends are about to have a water balloon fight for the Holi festival in Jalpur but someone stole the balloons. Will Mira find the balloons before it's too late? Song: "Let the Colors Fly"
25b	25b	"Mystery on the Jalpur Express"	Melissa Suber	S : Sascha Paladino; S/T : Lisa Kettle	Robert Sledge	March 27, 2021	106	0.42
Mira, Chikku, Mikku, and Prince Neel go on the inaugural train ride of the Jalpur Express as guests of Queen Shanti. However, Shanti's crown is mysteriously stolen. Can Mira and her friends solve the case?

=== Season 2 (2021-22) ===
No. overall	No. in season	Title	Directed by	Written by	Storyboards by	Original release date	Prod. code	U.S. viewers (millions)
26a	1a	"The Case of the Cunning Chameleon"	Fred Reyes	Vidhya Iyer	Sia Mistry (episode); Wendy Grieb (Song)	April 5, 2021	TBA	0.50
Mira shows Mikku and Chikku how to use their senses to find a missing chameleon. Song: "Use Your Senses"
26b	1b	"The Great Polo Mystery"	Francis Glebas	Becca Topol	Johnathan Peartree	April 5, 2021	TBA	0.50
When the mallets break at the polo match, Mira goes on the case to figure out what happened.
27a	2a	"Mira's Milestone Mystery"	Monica Tomova	Becca Topol	Katya Bowser	April 12, 2021	TBA	0.32
Mikku and Chikku tell Mira that she filled up her first case book. She is soon on the case of solving a mystery, with the promise of a "big surprise" if she solves the case.
27b	2b	"The Case of the Palace Peacock"	Francis Glebas	Kerri Grant	Dave Prince and Wendy Grieb	April 12, 2021	TBA	0.32
Meena's peacock, Koo, leaves her sight. Mira agrees to help her, while she has also said she will help Priya with Princess Shivani's new dress. Can she do both tasks at the same time, or will it tire her out?
28a	3a	"The Case of Dimple’s Lost Tooth"	Monica Tomova	S : Kerri Grant; T : Aminta Goyel and Becca Topol	Michael B. Singleton (episode); Wendy Grieb (Song)	April 19, 2021	TBA	0.34
Dimple's family begins celebrating after learning that the baby tooth of their daughter, Dimple, had come out. Kamala takes the tooth and puts it in her pocket for safekeeping. However, in the process of going around the town with Dimple, Mira, Chikku, and Mikku, she loses it. Can Mira, Chikku, and Mikku find the tooth before it is too late? Song: "The Missing Tooth Song"
28b	3b	"The Case of the Slumber Party Ghost"	Fred Reyes	Aminta Goyel	Kurt Anderson	April 19, 2021	TBA	0.34
After leaving the palace and talking with Prince Neel about his new invention, Mira, Mikku, and Chikku go to a sleepover. That night, a mysterious sound causes Dimple to wake up, resulting in Kamala, Priya, and Mira beginning a search for the source of the sound.
29a	4a	"Mystery Through the Front Window (Note: Sascha Paladino confirmed this title, and the episode itself, is a reference to the film Rear Window)"	Fred Reyes	Aminta Goyel	Jake Kim	April 26, 2021	TBA	0.33
Mira sprains her ankle and is confined to her room, but Arvin gives her a case to find out what is blocking the water taxis. Mira still decides to take the case despite Priya advising her against it. Can she solve the case from her apartment?
29b	4b	"The Case of the Fake Painting"	Francis Glebas	Vidhya Iyer	Tamal Hanley (episode); Wendy Grieb (Song)	April 26, 2021	TBA	0.33
In an official tour of the palace, Mira and her friends are suspicious of the tour guides who claim to know everything. Prince Veer brings Priya and Mira to the library to have a first look at the painting but finds out it is fake, leading Mira to begin an investigation. Song: "We Know It All"
30a	5a	"The Eid Mystery"	Monica Tomova	Nabeel Arshad	Becky Cassady (episode); Wendy Grieb (song)	May 3, 2021	212	0.43
Mira’s friend Sadia asks for her help in solving the case when they find a lost holiday Eid gift envelope on the ground. Song: "Eid Mubarak" (Note: Referencing the Arabic term "Eid Mubarak," which means “Blessed Feast/festival” and is used by Muslims as a greeting for use on the festivals of Eid al-Adha and Eid al-Fitr.)
30b	5b	"The Case of the Pinched Paintbrush"	Fred Reyes	Mike Kubat	Kurt Anderson	May 3, 2021	212	0.43
When Priya’s special paintbrush goes missing, Mira must go on the case to help her find it.
31a	6a	"Mystery in the Sky"	Monica Tomova	Becca Topol	Becky Cassady (episode); Wendy Grieb (song)	May 10, 2021	204	0.30
Mira sees something purple in the sky, but Mikku and Chikku have no idea what she is talking about. They ask Prince Neel for help and they fly in his new flying machine. Can they figure out the mystery? Song: "Mystery in the Sky"
31b	6b	"The Case of the Message in a Bottle"	Francis Glebas	Tim Maile and Douglas Tuber	Johnathan Peartree	May 10, 2021	204	0.30
Mira finds a message in a bottle and works to solve the mystery behind the "island king" with the help of Prince Neel, Mikku, and Chikku.
32a	7a	"The Case of the Lost Puppy"	Fred Reyes	Becca Topol	Sia Mistry (episode); Wendy Grieb (song)	May 17, 2021	TBA	N/A
When Mira and the mongooses find a lost puppy, they are on the case to find its family. Song: "Our Very Own Puppy"
32b	7b	"The Submarine Mystery"	Monica Tomova	Vidhya Iyer, Tim Maile and Douglas Tuber	Katya Bowser	May 17, 2021	TBA	N/A
Mira and Prince Neel are on the hunt for a submarine.
33a	8a	"The Case of the Lost Treehouse"	Fred Reyes	S : Sascha Paladino; T : Tim Maile and Douglas Tuber	Kurt Anderson (episode); Chris Harmon (song)	May 24, 2021	207	N/A
When Sahil and his childhood friend can’t find their old treehouse, Mira is on the case. Song: "Our Treehouse"
33b	8b	"The Case of the Vanishing Picnic"	Francis Glebas	S : Becca Topol; T : Aminta Goyel	Dave Prince and Tamal Hanley	May 24, 2021	207	N/A
Mira helps Mikku and Chikku find their missing basket of picnic food.
34a	9a	"Mystery on the Overnight Train"	Fred Reyes	S : Becca Topol; T : Tim Maile and Douglas Tuber	Jake Kim (episode); Wendy Grieb and Chris Harmon (song)	June 14, 2021	209	N/A
Mira’s mobile detective lab goes missing on an overnight train ride. Song: "Use What You've Got"
34b	9b	"The Case of the Broken Hand Pump"	Monica Tomova	Vidhya Iyer	Michael B. Singleton	June 14, 2021	209	N/A
Mira and Princess Shivani go on the case to figure out what’s blocking a broken water pump.
35a	10a	"The Case of the Runaway Tabla"	Fred Reyes	Sascha Paladino	Sia Mistry	June 28, 2021	210	N/A
Mira helps a visiting musician find his missing tabla before a big performance. Song: "The Runaway Tabla"
35b	10b	"The Bike Day Mystery"	Francis Glebas	Tim Maile and Douglas Tuber	Johnathan Peartree	June 28, 2021	210	N/A
On Jalpur's Bike Day, Mira assists Ranjeet and Manjeet as they track down training wheels for a bike they made.
36a	11a	"Mystery at the Naiyapuram Palace"	Monica Tomova	Jimy Shah	Katya Bowser	July 12, 2021	TBA	N/A
When Prince Veer's royal gift for the Queen of Naiyapuram's birthday goes missing, Mira goes on the case to find it.
36b	11b	"Mystery at the Sweet Sale"	Francis Glebas	Aminta Goyel	Dave Prince and Tamal Hanley (episode); Wendy Grieb (song)	July 12, 2021	TBA	N/A
Mira is on the hunt for the annual Sweet Sale's missing sweets. Song: "Sweets From Us!"
37a	12a	"The Teej Festival Mystery"	Monica Tomova	Vidhya Iyer	Becky Cassady (episode); Wendy Grieb (song)	July 26, 2021	208	N/A
Mira, Neeti and Preeti search for a missing basket of marigolds used for the Teej Festival. Song: "The Festival of Teej"
37b	12b	"Mystery at the Rangoli Competition"	Francis Glebas	Jimy Shah	Tamal Hanley	July 26, 2021	208	N/A
Mira takes on a case when some Rangolis are ruined before Jalpur’s Rangoli competition.
38a	13a	"The Great Kathak Mystery"	Fred Reyes	Jimy Shah	Jake Kim	August 9, 2021	TBA	N/A
Mira and her friends must track down their missing ghungroo bells to perform with a Kathak dance guru.
38b	13b	"The Mystery of the Missing Parts"	Francis Glebas	Vidhya Iyer	Tamal Hanley	August 9, 2021	TBA	N/A
When items start going missing around town, Mira is on the case.
39a	14a	"The Mystery of the Fluffy Pillows"	Monica Tomova	S : Becca Topol; T : Tim Maile and Douglas Tuber	Michael B. Singleton (episode); Wendy Grieb (song)	August 16, 2021	TBA	N/A
Mira is on the case to help Mikku and Chikku find their beloved fluffy pillows. Song: "Hey Pillow"
39b	14b	"The Mystery of the Missing Jhumkas"	Francis Glebas	Jimy Shah	Johnathan Peartree	August 16, 2021	TBA	N/A
Auntie Pushpa is having a sale at her boutique and needs Mira's help finding missing earrings.
40a	15a	"The Case of the Secret Singing Star"	Fred Reyes	Jimy Shah	Sia Mistry (episode); Wendy Grieb (song)	August 23, 2021	TBA	N/A
Mira helps Meena find a mysterious singer to feature in the Jalpur talent show. Song: "That Voice"
40b	15b	"The Mystery of the Missing Train"	Monica Tomova	Vidhya Iyer	Katya Bowser	August 23, 2021	TBA	N/A
When the Jalpur Express doesn't arrive at the train station, Mira is on the case! Song: "Chooko Chooko Choo"
41a	16a	"The Case of the Disoriented Ducklings"	Francis Glebas	Mike Kubat	Alexa Seidner (episode); Wendy Grieb (song)	September 13, 2021	TBA	N/A
Mira and the mongooses are on the case to help stray ducklings find their mother. Song: "Quack Quack"
41b	16b	"The Mystery of the Legendary Cave"	Fred Reyes	Becca Topol, Tim Maile and Douglas Tuber	Kurt Anderson	September 13, 2021	TBA	N/A
Mira and her friends set out to solve a cold case mystery to find a legendary cave.
42a	17a	"The Dandiya Dance Mystery"	Monica Tomova	Nida Chowdhry	Becky Cassady (episode); Wendy Grieb (song)	September 27, 2021	TBA	N/A
Mira goes on the case to help Meena find a dance partner.
42b	17b	"The Case of the Funky Fountain"	Francis Glebas	Vidhya Iyer	Tamal Hanley	September 27, 2021	TBA	N/A
When a strange clay starts showing up in Jalpur’s water sources, Mira is on the case to stop it.
43a	18a	"The Dasara Festival Mystery"	Fred Reyes	Vidhya Iyer	Kurt Anderson (episode); Wendy Grieb (song)	October 18, 2021	TBA	N/A
Mira and her friends go to the Dasara Festival to find Anoop before the elephant procession. Song: "The Dasara Festival"
43b	18b	"The Puppy Dog Detective"	Monica Tomova	Mike Kubat	Becky Cassady	October 18, 2021	TBA	N/A
When things in Jalpur start mysteriously breaking, Mira and friends must solve the case.
44a	19a	"The Case of the Mysterious Necklace"	Monica Tomova	Christina Kishpaugh	Katya Bowser (episode); Wendy Grieb (song)	October 25, 2021	TBA	N/A
Mira goes on the case to help figure out who sent Meena a necklace. Song: "Friendship First"
44b	19b	"The Great Donkey Mystery"	Fred Reyes	Vidhya Iyer	Jake Kim	October 25, 2021	TBA	N/A
When a delivery of pink salt for the spice shop goes missing, Mira is on the case to find out what happened.
45a	20a	"The Case of the Missing Lehenga Choli"	Fred Reyes	Shruthi Mathur	Sia Mistry	November 1, 2021	TBA	N/A
Mira is on the case to find a special lehenga for Dimple.
45b	20b	"The Case of the Mysterious House"	Francis Glebas	Jimy Shah	Johnathan Peartree	November 1, 2021	TBA	N/A
Mira and her friends go on a case to find Mikku and Chikku’s missing lucky ball.
46a	21a	"The Case of the Secret Code"	Francis Glebas	Jimy Shah	Alexa Seidner (episode); Wendy Grieb (song)	November 29, 2021	TBA	N/A
Mira is on a special case from Detective Gupta that will take her detective skills to the next level. Song: "The Next Level"
46b	21b	"Mystery at the Snake Boat Race"	Monica Tomova	Tim Maile and Douglas Tuber	Kelly Bishop	November 29, 2021	TBA	N/A
Mira goes on the case when strange things happen during a snake boat race.
47a	22a	"Mystery at the Food Festival"	Fred Reyes	S : Vidhya Iyer; T : Tim Maile and Douglas Tuber	Jake Kim (episode); Wendy Grieb (song)	December 6, 2021	TBA	N/A
When Mikku and Chikku are blamed for snacks that go missing, Mira goes on the case to find out what really happened. Song: "The Jalpur Food Festival"
47b	22b	"The Mystery of the Missing Bangles"	Francis Glebas	Nabeel Arshad	Tamal Hanley	December 6, 2021	TBA	N/A
When Mira's Uncle Naveen can't find Auntie Pushpa's bangles, Mira helps him find them.
48a	23a	"The Case of the Missing Mystery"	Monica Tomova	S : Sascha Paladino; T : Tim Maile and Douglas Tuber	Katya Bowser and Kelly Bishop	January 3, 2022	TBA	N/A
While teaching a class on how to be a detective, Mira's clues for the lesson go missing.
48b	23b	"Mystery at the Gili Danda Game"	Francis Glebas	Tamra Pica	Johnathan Peartree	January 3, 2022	TBA	N/A
Mira goes on the case when a mysterious gift of painted Gili Danda sticks is left for her.
49a	24a	"The Mystery of the Jalpur Jammers"	Fred Reyes	Jimy Shah	Sia Mistry	January 10, 2022	TBA	N/A
When Dad and Auntie are not where they're supposed to be, Mira is on the case to find them. Song:"Still Got It"
49b	24b	"Mystery of the Blue Jewel"	Monica Tomova	Christina Kishpaugh	Becky Cassady	January 10, 2022	TBA	N/A
When a present for Queen Shanti goes missing, Mira is on the case to find it.
50a	25a	"Mira's Musical Mystery Tour"	Fred Reyes	S : Sascha Paladino and Becca Topol; T : Aadip Desai	Kurt Anderson (episode); Wendy Grieb and Jake Kim (song)	February 28, 2022	TBA	N/A
While Mira organizes a music event for Joshi Sir, she must also find Joshi Sir's mother before the event begins. Songs: "We Can't Let Him Go", "Music Everywhere", and "Play It From the Heart"
50b	25b	"The Case of the Mystery Mehfil"	Francis Glebas	Jimy Shah	Alexa Seidner	February 28, 2022	TBA	N/A
Mira helps Chikku find the location of a poetry event in Jalpur.
51	26	"The Mystery of the Legendary Sword"	Fred Reyes	S : Becca Topol; T : Tim Maile and Douglas Tuber	Johnathan Peartree and Tamal Hanley (episode); Jake Kim (song)	May 2, 2022	TBA	N/A
Mira and her friends embark on an epic quest to find a legendary sword said to belong to the rightful ruler of Jalpur. Song: "You Gotta Be Strong"
52	27	"Mikku and Chikku's Hometown Mystery"	Monica Tomova	Becca Topol and Jimy Shah	Becky Cassady and Sia Mistry	May 16, 2022	TBA	N/A
Mira is thrilled to accompany Mikku and Chikku to their hometown, a mongoose-filled village, where she meets their parents, joins a local festival and helps solve a surprising mystery. Songs: "Nevapur Anthem" and "The Mongoose Freestyle Face-Off"
53	28	"The Mystery of the Royal Flight"	Francis Glebas	Becca Topol	Alexa Seinder Kurt Andreson and Jake Kim; Wendy Grieb (song)	May 30, 2022	TBA	N/A
When Prince Neel's new flying invention gets a mysterious hole during a big royal event, Mira must figure out what happened before it's too late. Song: "Keep Your Eyes on Us"
54	29	"The Big Jalpur Wedding Mystery"	Fred Reyes	Jimy Shah	Jonathan Deartree and Jamal Hanley (episode); Jake Kim (song)	June 20, 2022	TBA	N/A
It's the day of a huge, joyful wedding in Jalpur, and Mira and her friends must track down the missing groom so the wedding can go on as planned. Songs: "A Perfect Day for a Wedding" and "One Big Family" Note:This is the series finale.
