= Miles from Tomorrowland =

- Also known as: Miles from Tomorrow; Mission Force One (season 3)
- Genre: Children's television series Science fiction
- Created by: Sascha Paladino
- Based on: Tomorrowland
- Directed by: Paul Demeyer; Michael Daedalus Kenny; Kelly James; Sue Perrotto; John Eng; Jeff McGrath
- Voices of: Cullen McCarthy (season 1); Justin Felbinger (seasons 2–3); Fiona Bishop; Olivia Munn; Tom Kenny; Dee Bradley Baker
- Theme music composer: Beau Black
- Opening theme: "Way Out" by Beau Black (seasons 1–2) "Mission Force One" by Neil deGrasse Tyson & Frederik Wiedmann (season 3)
- Ending theme: "Way Out" (Instrumental) "Mission Force One Theme Song" (Instrumental)
- Composers: Frederik Wiedmann (score); Beau Black & Matt Mahaffey (songs)
- Country of origin: United States
- Original language: English
- No. of seasons: 3
- No. of episodes: 75 (144 segments) (list of episodes)

Production
- Executive producers: Sascha Paladino; Richard Marlis; Carmen Italia
- Producers: Elizabeth Seidman & Audrey Geiger-Ford
- Editors: Nicole Dubuc; Greg Johnson
- Running time: 22 minutes
- Production company: Wild Canary Animation

Original release
- Network: Disney Junior
- Release: February 6, 2015 – September 10, 2018

Miles from Tomorrowland, also known as Miles from Tomorrow internationally, is an American animated children's television series created by Sascha Paladino. It aired as shorts from January 19 to 23, before officially premiering on February 6, 2015. This series is based on the themed land Tomorrowland from the Disney Parks.

For the third season, which debuted on October 16, 2017, on Disney Channel, Miles from Tomorrowland changed its name to Mission Force One. It ended after three seasons, with the series finale airing on September 10, 2018. The series was renewed for a fourth season on February 4, 2018, but was cancelled on March 28 due to negative reception and low ratings in the third season.

== Premise ==
In the year 2500, the Callisto family, consisting of Miles, his sister Loretta, and their scientist parents Phoebe and Leo, live aboard their spaceship, the Stellosphere and work for the Tomorrowland Transit Authority (TTA) to connect the universe. In season 3, Miles later leads a team called Mission Force One, which consists of Loretta and their friends Haruna, Blodger, and Mirandos, as they continue their mission to connect and protect Tomorrowland, while also dealing with a new threat in the form of an organization known as Nemesystems, who wants to control the TTA.

== Episodes ==
Season	Segments	Episodes	Originally released	
Season	Segments	Episodes	First released	Last released
1	59	30	February 6, 2015	March 18, 2016
2	46	24	June 20, 2016	August 26, 2017
3	39	21	October 16, 2017	September 10, 2018

== Characters ==
The show's voice director is Lisa Schaffer.

=== Main ===
Callisto family

- Miles Callisto (voiced by Cullen McCarthy in season 1 and Justin Felbinger in seasons 2 and 3) is an enthusiastic and curious 10-year-old boy with a somewhat reckless inventive streak. He is also the captain of the newly established Mission Force One, and its starship, the Zenith. He possesses a hovering skateboard called a Blastboard and a plasma boomerang known as a Lazerang. As the captain of Mission Force One, he uses a shield that doubles as a Blastboard, as well as a Lazerang that can extend and become a staff.
- Loretta Callisto (voiced by Fiona Bishop) is Miles' big sister who is 11 years old and the brainier of the two children. She is a technology whiz who likes to read directions and follow the rules. She is also Mission Force One's mission specialist, and as a member of Mission Force One, wields holographic chakrams called Holo-Hexes. Loretta is fascinated by the ancient, technologically advanced species only known as "The Builders".
- Phoebe Callisto (née Beifong) (voiced by Olivia Munn) is Leo's wife, Loretta and Miles' mother, and the ship's captain. She is an ambitious and accomplished woman who excels in her career and challenges her family to do their best.
- Leonard "Leo" Callisto (voiced by Tom Kenny) is Phoebe's husband, Loretta and Miles' father, and the ship's engineer and Stellar Mechanic. He is also a pilot and the inventor of the family. Leo demonstrates a relaxed attitude which leads him to problem-solve in innovative ways.

Callisto companions:

- Stella (voiced by Grey Griffin) is the computer voice at the ship Stellosphere.
- M.E.R.C. (Mechanical Emotionally Responsive Creature; voiced by Dee Bradley Baker) is a robotic ostrich who is never far from Miles's side.
- Admiral Watson (voiced by Danny Jacobs) and Crick (voiced by Diedrich Bader) are a two headed alien who serves as the admiral of the Tomorrowland Transit Authority. Watson is the head of the Tomorrowland Transit Authority and is the more serious of the siblings and Crick is the head of the Tomorrowland Transit Authority, who is seen to be more comedic (intentionally or not) of the siblings. Watson and Crick are named after James Watson and Francis Crick, who discovered the structure of DNA.

=== Recurring ===
- Joe Callisto (voiced by Adrian Grenier) is an intergalactic crime fighter, Leo's brother, and Miles and Loretta's uncle. He is accompanied by the robotic dog Cap9.
- Vincent Callisto (voiced by Jonathan Frakes) is Leo's father and retired captain of the TTA ship Explorer
- Gadfly Garnett (voiced by Mark Hamill) is an alien outlaw obsessed with owning the latest technology.
- Spectryx (voiced by George Takei) is an alien from the planet Parallax who can only see in infrared.
- Professor Randii Rubicon (voiced by Bill Nye) is a scientist who mostly studies Neptune and the Builders. He gave the Cosmic Explorers and Loretta a tour of the Trident Research Station in Neptune.
- Axel is a robot that the admirals sent to the Callistos as a replacement for M.E.R.C. He is strong and helpful, but also very uncaring. Because of this, he was recalled by the admirals, who allowed M.E.R.C. to stay with the Callistos.
- Commander S'leet (voiced by Wil Wheaton) who's a secondary villain until the third season, who can seemingly disappear, as if digitally.
- Lysander Floovox (voiced by Alton Brown)
- Auntie Frida (voiced by Brenda Song) is Phoebe's sister. She can do a one-arm handstand on Mars and paints while doing so.
- Mr. Avon Xylon (voiced by Dee Bradley Baker) is an alien mailman. Baker also voices Lieutenant Luminex, Captain Joe's second-in-command.
- The Game Master (voiced by Whoopi Goldberg) is a play creative tech genius.
- Dr. Consilium (voiced by LeVar Burton) is a Galactic School teacher.
- Dr. Zephyr Skye (a.k.a. Dr. Z.; voiced by Ginger Zee) is Tomorrowland's leading meteorologist.
- Haruna Kitumba (voiced by Issac Ryan Brown) is Miles's best friend and neighbor prior to Miles' departure to space who serves as a navigator of the Mission Force One. His Mission Force One armored suit gives him the ability to punch through anything.
- Pipp Wimpley (voiced by Ethan Wacker) is a young alien from the oceanic planet Atlantix.
- Mirandos (voiced by Ivy Bishop) is a young intelligent Ariellian from the planet Tempestoro who serves as an engineer of Mission Force One. She wears gloves known as "Solidizer gloves" that can create any object.
- Dashiell Scamp (voiced by Diedrich Bader) is an alien who "trades" for robots and leaves newton balls in exchange.
- Zeno (voiced by Manny Montana) is the computer voice of the starship Zenith.
- Commander Nemex (voiced by Elan Garfias) is the cruel commander of the Nemesystems. He is later revealed to be Silas, a TTA Cadet who was rejected from Mission Force One due to his dislike of working with others.
- Aggro (voiced by John DiMaggio) is the second-in-command of the Nemesystems.

==== Blopp family ====
- Captain Bobble Blopp (voiced by Danny Jacobs)
- Blippy Blopp (voiced by Tom Kenny)
- Blodger Blopp (voiced by Sam Lavagnino) is the son of Bobble and Blippy, Miles' friend from planet Bloppsburgh who serves as a ship operator of Mission Force One. He is able to transform into any inanimate object.

==== Dethalians ====
- Queen Gemma (voiced by Grey Griffin) is the queen of the Dethalians. Ever since Gadfly tried to steal her technology, she does not trust anyone who trespasses into her territory uninvited. However, in some episodes, she becomes a reluctant ally and shows a kinder side. She loves her son Rygan and is very protective of him.
- Prince Rygan (voiced by Rio Mangini) is Queen Gemma's son. Rygan made friends with Miles and helped him and his family escape after Queen Gemma arrested them for entering her kingdom without permission. In Scavengers of Mars, he becomes a Cosmic Explorer and joins the scavenger hunt.

== Production ==
Nancy Kanter said "We hope this series will influence a child's interest in science and technology by introducing them at an early age to the exciting world of space exploration, how things work and what lies beyond the here and now." A total of 24 episodes, each consisting of two 11-minute stories, were ordered for the series' first season with Indian animation studio DQ Entertainment animating the series.

On April 28, 2015, the series was renewed for a second season, which premiered on June 20, 2016. On September 1, 2017, it was announced that it was renewed for a third season, but the series was renamed Mission Force One.

Miles from Tomorrowland is made by using Autodesk Maya. The CGI character designs were created with Adobe Photoshop and Adobe After Effects, and the 3D models were created in Maya. The episodes are edited with Adobe Premiere.

== Release ==
=== Broadcast ===
Miles from Tomorrowland premiered on Disney Junior in Canada on February 21, 2015. In Australia and New Zealand, Disney Junior released the series on April 18. In the United Kingdom and Ireland, the show premiered on Disney Junior on May 11 as Miles from Tomorrow. In Asia, it debuted on Disney Junior on August 17. In India, it premiered on Disney Junior on February 6, 2016.

=== Home media ===
Home media is distributed by Walt Disney Studios Home Entertainment. The series was later made available to stream on Disney+.

DVD releases
Title	Release date	Episodes	Additional features
Miles from Tomorrowland: Let's Rocket!	August 11, 2015	"Runaway Shuttle" / "Surfin' the Whirlpool" (Season 1, Episode 1); "Ocean in Motion" / "Explorer Exchange" (Season 1, Episode 3); "Game On" / "How I Saved My Summer Vacation" (Season 1, Episode 4); "Who Stole the Stellosphere?" / "Rock N' Roll" (Season 1, Episode 6); "To the Goldilocks Zone" / "Hiccup in the Plan" (Season 1, Episode 9)	Clip-On Blastboard Flashlight

== Reception ==
=== Critical response ===
Neil Genzlinger of The New York Times called Miles from Tomorrowland "enjoyable." He went on to say, "This family is a foursome plus pet, but if The Jetsons was some kind of inspiration for it, everyone has received an upgrade... Yes, it's a bit creepy to think of two children being raised in the claustrophobic confines of a four-person spaceship, home schooling taken to an extreme. But the show is fast-moving enough to keep young viewers interested... and it's not shy about putting Miles and Loretta in gently life-threatening predicaments. Parents, meanwhile, might get a kick out of guessing who is providing the voices of some recurring characters." Rob Owen of the Pittsburgh Post-Gazette said "Miles from Tomorrowland has some real science facts threaded through it- there's mention of Jupiter's moon lo in an early episode- but given how these factoids sit side-by-side with the science fiction gadgets and spaceships, its unclear what positive educational impact their inclusion will have." He also noted that "the show's family role modeling is commendable."

Emily Ashby of Common Sense Media have the series a grade of four out of five stars, praised the depiction of positive messages and role models, saying that Miles from Tomorrowland challenges traditional gender roles and promotes work ethic, while noting the presence of educational value regarding the vocabulary dealing with space. Azure Hall and Casey Suglia of Romper included Miles from Tomorrowland in their "Great Shows Your Kids Will Love To Stream On Disney+" list, writing, "If you have a kid that's space obsessed, or have a big imagination that is out of this world, this show is sure to be right up their alley."

=== Ratings ===
The series was watched by more than 2.5 million viewers in the United Kingdom and 10% of British kids aged 4 to 7 watched it in the first week alone, making it the UK's highest rated pay TV kids channel. It was the highest rated show on Disney Junior for May 2015. Across the EMEA region, it received 8.7 million viewers, including 2.6 million young kids and 1.1 million boys.

Since airing, Miles from Tomorrowland has achieved ratings success for Disney. According to a press release by Disney–ABC Television Group using data from Nielsen, across Q3 of 2015 (6/29 through 9/27), Miles from Tomorrowland was the fourth highest-rated series across preschooler-dedicated TV networks in the US with 653,000 total viewers ages 2+ who watched the show on Disney Junior. This ranking was surpassed only by PJ Masks (767,000), Sofia the First (667,000), and Mickey Mouse Clubhouse (666,000), all Disney Junior shows as well.

=== Accolades ===
Year	Award	Category	Nominee(s) and recipient(s)	Result	Ref.
2015	Environmental Media Awards	Children's Television	Miles from Tomorrowland	Won	
2016	Daytime Emmy Awards	Outstanding Special Class Animated Program	Carmen Italia, Richard Marlis, Sascha Paladino, Paul Demeyer, Elizabeth Seidman, Audrey Geiger-Ford	Nominated	
2016	Daytime Emmy Awards	Outstanding Sound Mixing - Animation	Carlos Sanches, Otis Van Osten	Nominated	
2017	Kidscreen Awards	Best Animated Series	Miles from Tomorrowland	Nominated	

== In other media ==
=== Video games ===
In 2015, Disney Enterprises, Inc. released a mobile app inspired by the television series called Miles from Tomorrowland: Missions as well as an interactive episode on the now-defunct Disney Junior Appisodes mobile app.
