= Disney Channel (Southeast Asia) =

Defunct Asian children's television channel

Disney Channel (Asia)
- Broadcast area: Singapore (until 31 May 2020); Malaysia and Brunei (until 31 December 2020); Rest of Southeast Asia, Bangladesh, Hong Kong, and parts of Oceania (until 30 September 2021); Taiwan (until 31 December 2021)
- Headquarters: Corporate office: 1 Fusionopolis View, #06-01 Sandcrawler Building, Singapore 138577; Studio and production facilities: 4 Loyang Ln #01-01/02 and #02-01/02., Singapore 508914; Suria KLCC, Jalan Ampang, Kuala Lumpur, Malaysia

Programming
- Languages: English; Chinese (Mandarin/Cantonese; dubbing/subtitles); Indonesian (dubbing/subtitles); Thai (dubbing); Malay (dubbing); Vietnamese (subtitles)

Ownership
- Owner: The Walt Disney Company (Southeast Asia) Pte. Ltd.; Fox Networks Group/Disney Networks Group Asia Pacific
- Sister channels: Disney Junior (closed); Disney XD (closed)

History
- Launched: 29 March 1995; 31 years ago (Taiwan feed); 1 October 1996; 29 years ago (Malaysia feed); 15 January 2000; 26 years ago (pan-Asian feed); 2 April 2004; 22 years ago (Hong Kong feed)
- Closed: 1 June 2020; 6 years ago (Singapore); 1 January 2021; 5 years ago (Malaysia and Brunei); 1 October 2021; 4 years ago (pan-Asian feed and Hong Kong); 1 January 2022; 4 years ago (Taiwan)
- Replaced by: Disney+ (de facto)
- Former names: The Disney Channel (1995-1997)

Disney Channel was a pan-Asian pay television children's channel owned and operated by The Walt Disney Company Southeast Asia.

It began broadcasting its own Taiwanese feed on 29 March 1995, until its main Asian feed launch in January 2000 across Malaysia, Singapore, Brunei, and the Philippines; until its later expansions to most of Southeast Asia in the following years. The channel was closed on 1 October 2021, while Taiwan's version closed on 1 January 2022, as part of a wider switch to streaming services Disney+.

Disney Channel Asia's programming consisted of original first-run television series, theatrically released and original made-for-television films, selected other third-party programming, and Malaysian-based originals.

== History ==
=== Pre-launch ===
The Walt Disney Company opened an office in Hong Kong in December 1994 to manage its television interests in the Asia-Pacific region, with the aim of starting a television channel in Taiwan with a 20-hour schedule. The channel's distributor was Po-Hsin Entertainment, a company partly owned by the then-ruling Kuomintang and was frustrated during the legalization of cable television in Taiwan.

The company announced plans in January 1995 to launch a satellite television station in Singapore, with its Singaporean television subsidiary running the facility. The facility was "not designed for a Singapore Disney Channel", pursuing the goal of launching the network in Singapore in order to explore business opportunities in the Asia-Pacific region. The license was awarded by the Telecommunications Authority of Singapore on 1 March 1995, the first to be used entirely for and by a single company.

The facilities were formally open on 26 March 1995, three days before the launch of the Taiwanese channel, with a speech by Minister of the Arts Brigadier-General George Yeo, who delivered a speech mainly centered on the American cultural industry and the contrasts between the wholesomeness of Mickey Mouse and the cynicism of Beavis and Butt-Head, and how the rest of the world felt unsure about American culture as a whole. About 150 people attended the ceremony. Yeo affirmed that the resurgence of interest in Disney and similar products reflected a "deeper renewal of human society" and that even in a conservative country like Singapore, a country still dominated by "old-fashioned" values, products and programs from Disney were seen as "very comfortable" with consumers. Moreover, Singapore was the world's largest consumer of Disney products per capita at the time. The satellite station alone cost S$14 million with the possibility of Singapore being the second country in Asia to receive Disney Channel, pending negotiations with Singapore Cable Vision, which was set to start its regular cable service in June. In addition, the facility was also used for dubbing content in other languages, as well as moving more of the facilities done in Hong Kong to the new ones in Singapore.

The Disney Channel began broadcasting in Taiwan on 29 March 1995 at 2:00 pm (Taipei), marking its first Disney Channel overseas, with Po-Hsin Entertainment as its distributor, available in both English and Mandarin. The ceremony took place at Grand Hyatt Taipei in Taiwan. The channel operated from Walt Disney Television's facilities in Loyang, Singapore using the Apstar-1 satellite; negotiations with Singapore Cable Vision to include the channel on its package were underway. On 1 October 1996, another feed was launched in Malaysia, where it was available exclusively on the satellite TV platform Astro broadcasting solely in English.

=== First launch and expansion ===
Between January and February 2000, Disney Television International Asia-Pacific launched Disney Channel in more countries and was made available for Malaysia, Singapore, Brunei and the Philippines; broadcasting with an English audio track with Mandarin subtitles.

On 1 June 2002, the channel was launched in the South Korean market, with additional Korean subtitles under English language, in July 2002, Disney Channel expanded to Indonesia, which later aired programs in Indonesian.

In December 2002, Disney Channel Asia moved its headquarters from Hong Kong to Singapore, seven years after launching its satellite broadcasting center back in 1995. A Studio D block for Saturday mornings started on 5 July 2003. It featured premiere episodes of US originals and studio-based segments.

On 2 April 2004, Disney Channel along with Playhouse Disney launched in Hong Kong.

Over the first six months of 2005, Disney Channel Asia, along with sister channel Playhouse Disney (later Disney Junior) were launched in Vietnam, at a time when the country's under-14 population stood at 24 million, Palau and Thailand. It also launched both channels in Cambodia, its 11th market on 20 June 2005, with Cambodia Entertainment Production Co. Ltd. as distributor.

In December 2006, Disney Channel expanded to Papua New Guinea on the HiTron cable service.

On 1 July 2011, Disney Channel launched its Korean feed separating the pan-Asian feed, which was the first Disney channel to be broadcasting with Korean dubbing.

After the ban of Disney Channel India and Disney XD India in Bangladesh as the networks were constantly broadcasting content in the Hindi language and its heavy localization back in 2013, Disney Channel Asia was made available on several digital cable platforms, such as Bengal Digital, in the country in approximately 2016. Due to the closure of the channel, India-based Disney International HD started broadcasting in Bangladesh as a replacement.

=== Closure ===
Disney Channel, Disney XD and Disney Junior closed in Singapore on 1 June 2020 after failing to renew their contracts, on both Singtel and StarHub.

On 1 January 2021, Disney Channel and Disney Junior closed in Malaysia on Astro due to its children's offerings being refurbished, and the preparation of the launch of Disney+ (Disney+ Hotstar) in the country. It closed down while airing Bolt at midnight.

After 21 years on the air, Disney Channel, including Disney Junior and most of its Fox channels officially closed in the rest of Asia; and Hong Kong on 1 October 2021. It closed at midnight (UTC+07:00), concluding with Star vs. the Forces of Evil on the pan-Asian feed and Bao on the Hong Kong feed. Disney Channel in Taiwan continued operations, until its closure on 1 January 2022, after a Big Hero 6: The Series short at midnight (UTC+08:00).

After the closures, most of the aired programs were later moved to Disney+.

== Presentation and logos ==
With the launch of the channel in 2000, Disney Channel Asia began to use the "Circles" presentation package, until the end of April 2003, when the US logo (and design package by CA Square) as the "Bounce" graphics, it became the channel's on-air presentation format, then later rebranded using the "Ribbon" graphics from 2007 until 2011. Two more redesigns were made in 2012, then on 1 August 2014, with the current wordmark logo.

Disney Channel Asia started using parts of the US "Social Media" rebrand from 1 December 2017 and rebranded fully on 1 January 2018 at 6 am. As of 2020, it has also used elements of the US "Item Age" graphics, while Hong Kong and Taiwan keep its old branding before the closure.

1995–1997 (Taiwan), 1996–1997 (Malaysia)

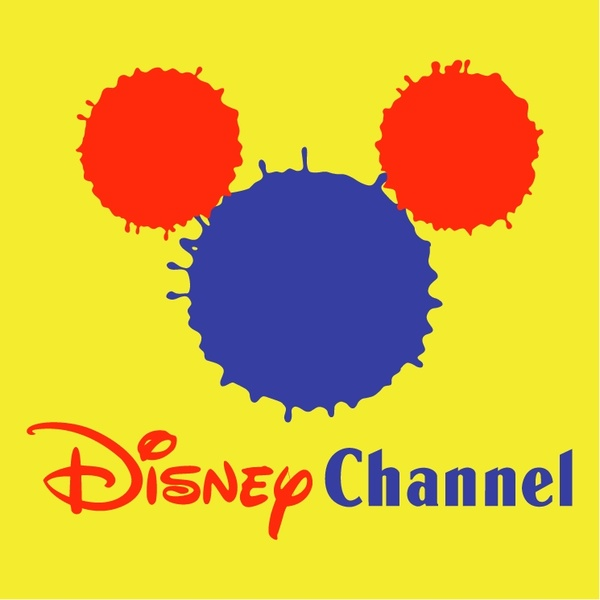
1997–2003

2003–2011 (Asia and Taiwan), 2004–2011 (Hong Kong)

2011–2014

2014–2018

2018–2020 (Asia), 2018–2021 (Hong Kong), 2018–2022 (Taiwan)

2020–2021 (Asia)

== Final feeds ==
=== Southeast Asia ===
The pan-Asian feed was available in Thailand, Fiji, Palau, Cambodia, Papua New Guinea, Myanmar, and Bangladesh. This feed ceased airing movies and started sharing the same schedule with the Indonesian feed on 1 February 2021. This feed officially closed on 1 October 2021.

==== Singapore ====
The schedule was similar to the main feed, along with local advertisements. Some programming was replaced by sitcoms. This feed was closed on 1 June 2020, after failing to renew their contracts on both StarHub and Singtel.

==== Malaysia and Brunei ====
Same schedule as the Asia feed, with local advertisements; began early on 15 January 2000. It was available in four languages: English, Malay, Mandarin and Tamil. This channel was only available on Astro in Malaysia and Kristal-Astro in Brunei. Because of Astro's children's package being refreshed on 14 December 2020, Disney Channel, along with Disney Junior, were removed on Astro and Astro-owned TV providers (including NJOI and Kristal-Astro) on 1 January 2021.

Therefore, there was the only impact that The Walt Disney Company would be shutting down Disney XD in Southeast Asia on the same date and time by following the review of Disney's business in this region, just before Astro has already confirmed with this statement before Astro shutting down both Disney Channel and Disney Junior on the same date and time. However, The Walt Disney Company did not announce that Astro would be shutting down Disney Channel and Disney Junior on 1 January 2021 at midnight. This feed closed on that date, along with Disney Junior and Disney XD, on Astro due to their refreshed children's package.

==== Indonesia ====
Began in July 2002; the schedule was very similar to the main feed, with the exclusions of movies at launch. The feed later started sharing the same schedule with the main feed in February 2021. The channel completely closed on 1 October 2021.

==== Philippines ====
Began on 15 January 2000. It had the same schedule as the Asia feed with local advertisements. The channel closed on 1 October 2021.

==== Vietnam ====
Launched in May 2005. A one-hour time-shifted version of the main Asia feed with local advertisements, Vietnamese translations in promos, and subtitles. The channel closed on 1 October 2021.

==== HD channel ====
On 2 May 2015, The Walt Disney Company Southeast Asia launched a high-definition simulcast feed of Disney Channel in the Philippines, available on Sky Cable and Destiny Cable distributed by ACCION in that country. Just like its SD counterpart, the HD simulcast of the channel airs the same shows shown in the SD feed. The HD feed was also launched on TrueVisions in Thailand on 7 July 2016 as an exclusive for cable subscribers, and on Astro in Malaysia on 15 November 2019 for satellite subscribers. The HD channels closed on 1 October 2021.

=== Hong Kong ===
Launched on 2 April 2004, along with Playhouse Disney. The schedule of this feed was shared with the Taiwan feed and was separated from the main feed on 2 April 2004. It was broadcast in English and Cantonese languages. The channel closed on 1 October 2021.

=== Taiwan ===
It was the first overseas feed launched by Disney Channels Worldwide. It began operations on 29 March 1995. It had its own schedule with local advertisements and broadcasts in English and Taiwanese Mandarin. The feed closed on 1 January 2022, after 26 years of broadcasting.

== Sister channels ==
=== Disney Junior ===
Disney Junior was a 24-hour television preschool channel, and the sister channel of Disney Channel, aimed at children and preschoolers from 2–7 years old. Originally launched as a morning block on Disney Channel as Playhouse Disney in 2000; and officially launched as a television channel on 2 April 2004 in Hong Kong and Indonesia. It was later expanded in Singapore, Malaysia, Brunei, Thailand, Vietnam, Cambodia, and the Philippines; between 2004 and 2005 respectively.

On 11 July 2011, Playhouse Disney was rebranded as Disney Junior, on both the morning block and the television channel itself. The block was discontinued on 31 July 2018, while the channel was entirely closed in the region on 1 October 2021 along with Disney Channel; excluding Singapore and Malaysia, since it previously closed in those countries on 1 June 2020 and 1 January 2021 respectively.

=== Disney XD ===
Disney XD was a Southeast Asian television channel, aimed for older children and teenagers from 6–15 years old, the channels launch on 15 September 2012 in Malaysia, 16 March 2013 in Singapore, 19 October 2013, in Indonesia and Thailand; and 31 May 2014 in the Philippines, concluding its launch. The channel was closed on 1 January 2021, excluding Singapore, since it was discontinued on 1 June 2020.

== Programming ==
During the launch, the channel featured premiere movies, The Lion King II: Simba's Pride, Sleeping Beauty, Mary Poppins, Hercules, George of the Jungle, The Parent Trap and the live action version of 101 Dalmatians, including the series The Wonderful World of Disney. It was also featured American television series Hercules The Series, Timon and Pumbaa, Bear in the Big Blue House, and The New Adventures of Winnie the Pooh, as well as children's drama series Crash Zone and Flash Forward. It also had local content, with Disney Buzz (Studio Disney), and its morning block Playhouse Disney (Disney Junior).

=== Programming Blocks ===
==== Final ====
===== Movies Unlimited =====
Movies Unlimited was the film programming block on Disney Channel. It aired at 3:00 pm (UTC+08:00); it ended on 30 September 2021, prior to the closure.

==== Former ====
===== Monstober =====
Monstober was a halloween programming block with special marathons every October. It ended in 2020.

===== Disney Junior =====
Disney Junior was the preschool morning block of Disney Channel, began during the 2000 launch as Playhouse Disney. Rebranded as Disney Junior on Disney Channel on 11 July 2011 and was halted on 31 July 2018.

===== Disney Channel Movie =====
Disney Channel Movie was a film-oriented programming block on Disney Channel from 2005 to 2021, replacing The Wonderful World of Disney.

===== The Wonderful World of Disney =====
The Wonderful World of Disney was a film-oriented programming block on Disney Channel from 2000 to 2005 before it was replaced by Disney Channel Movie.

=== Original series and adaptations ===
==== Club Mickey Mouse ====
Club Mickey Mouse was the Malaysian adaptation of Mickey Mouse Club, originally premiered on 15 September 2017.
