= Disney XD (Southeast Asia) =

Defunct pan-Asian pay television channel

- Final logo used from 1 September 2015 to 1 January 2021
- Broadcast area: Singapore (until 31 May 2020); Bangladesh, Indonesia, Malaysia, Philippines, and Thailand (until 31 December 2020)
- Headquarters: 1 Fusionopolis View, #06-01 Sandcrawler Building, Singapore 138577

Programming
- Languages: English; Chinese (dubbing/subtitles); Malay (dubbing/subtitles); Indonesian (dubbing/subtitles); Thai (dubbing/subtitles); Tamil (dubbing/subtitles); Japanese (dubbing/subtitles)
- Picture format: 1080i HDTV

Ownership
- Owner: The Walt Disney Company (Southeast Asia) Pte. Ltd.; Disney Networks Group Asia Pacific
- Sister channels: Disney Channel; Disney Junior

History
- Launched: 15 September 2012; 13 years ago (Malaysia); 16 March 2013; 13 years ago (Singapore); 19 October 2013; 12 years ago (Indonesia & Thailand); 31 May 2014; 12 years ago (Philippines); 2016; 10 years ago (Bangladesh)
- Closed: 1 March 2019; 7 years ago (SD feed, Malaysia); 1 June 2020; 6 years ago (Singapore); 1 January 2021; 5 years ago (Southeast Asia & Bangladesh)
- Replaced by: Metro Channel (Cignal channel space, Philippines); TA-DAA! (Astro channel space, Malaysia)

Disney XD was a pan-Asian pay television channel owned by The Walt Disney Company (Southeast Asia) Pte. Ltd., and part of the Disney Branded Television. Aimed primarily at children aged 6 to 15, it featured a lineup that included Marvel and Star Wars series, reruns of shows previously aired on Disney Channel, various action series, and some preschool programming from Disney Junior.

== History ==
Disney XD launched in Malaysia on 15 September 2012 as the first international kids' channel available on Astro's basic package. It expanded to Singapore on March 16, 2013, Indonesia and Thailand on 19 October 2013, and the Philippines on 31 May 2014.

After Disney Channel India and Disney XD India were banned in Bangladesh for broadcasting in Hindi, Disney XD Asia became available on a few digital cable platforms along with Disney Channel Asia and Disney Junior Asia in 2016.

In 2019, the Malaysian feed of Disney XD Asia was merged into the main feed, with Astro converting Disney XD to an HD-only channel.

Disney Channel, Disney XD, and Disney Junior ceased transmission in Singapore on 1 June 2020.

Disney XD, along with Disney Channel and Disney Junior stopped broadcasting on Astro and its affiliated platforms across Malaysia and Brunei. As part of a broader review of Disney's business in the region, Disney XD ceased operations across the rest of Southeast Asia and Bangladesh on 1 January 2021.

Following the closure of the channel, some of its content was moved to Disney Channel Asia where Disney XD was not distributed in Hong Kong or Vietnam; (later ceased). Most content were move to Disney+.

== Logos ==
2012–2015

2015–2021
