= The Chicken Squad =

American animated television series

- The series' poster
- Genre: Comedy; Adventure
- Created by: Tom Rogers
- Based on: The Chicken Squad by Doreen Cronin
- Voices of: Ramone Hamilton; Gabriella Graves; Maxwell Simkins; Yvette Nicole Brown
- Theme music composer: Mike Himelstein; Alex Geringas
- Opening theme: "The Chicken Squad Theme" performed by Renee Sands
- Ending theme: "The Chicken Squad End Theme"
- Composer: Gregory James Jenkins
- Country of origin: United States
- Original language: English
- No. of seasons: 1
- No. of episodes: 29 (58 segments)

Production
- Executive producers: Tom Rogers; Richard Marlis; Carmen Italia
- Producers: Rachel Ruderman; Peter Anderson
- Running time: 22 minutes
- Production company: Wild Canary Animation

Original release
- Network: Disney Junior
- Release: May 14, 2021 – April 22, 2022

The Chicken Squad is an American animated television series created by Tom Rogers that aired on Disney Junior from May 14, 2021 to April 22, 2022. It is based on the books written by Doreen Cronin. The series features the voices of Yvette Nicole Brown, Ramone Hamilton, Gabriella Graves and Maxwell Simkins. The series theme song is performed by former Kids Incorporated star Renee Sands.

== Premise ==
The show follows Coop, Little Boo and Sweetie – a trio of young chicken siblings and their mentor Captain Tully, a retired search and rescue husky, who use teamwork and critical thinking skills to solve problems and keep the peace in their neighborhood.

If an animal, mostly referred to as a "critter", needs the aid of the Chicken Squad, he/she can summon them through an electronic sounding device. Upon hearing that critter's report, the Chicken Squad head to their headquarters (which is actually their home), where they don their uniforms, and gather certain equipment.

To get to certain places, the Chicken Squad has a variety of forms of transportation. One of their vehicles is a car, which they won in a basketball tournament. Coop would later build other vehicles such as a motorcycle and a helicopter.

Whenever a character thinks of something, his/her thought bubble can be seen and edited by anyone around.

== Characters ==
=== Main ===
- Coop (voiced by Ramone Hamilton) is the tech-savvy chicken.
- Sweetie (voiced by Gabriella Graves) is the strong chicken.
- Little Boo (voiced by Maxwell Simkins) is the speedy chicken.
- Captain Tully (voiced by Yvette Nicole Brown) is a retired search and rescue Alaskan husky with two different colored eyes, and mentor to the trio. Long before getting her job, she was a stray pup until she met a dog who took her to a dog school where she received food and shelter.

=== Recurring/Supporting ===
- Frazz (voiced by Tony Hale) is a tea-loving squirrel.
- Dr. Dirt (voiced by Jane Lynch) is a forensic scientist snail. She does not call other characters by name, but instead nicknames them ("Strong Chicklet" for Sweetie, "Captain Woof Woof" for Captain Tully, etc.). Whenever the view is not on her, she would quickly but mysteriously move from one location to another.
- Pumpkin (voiced by Mimi Ryder) is a shy female calico cat.
- Pinky (voiced by Serenity Reign Brown) is a female pink pig.
- Dinah (voiced by Melissa Rauch) is the chicks' mother.
- Riley (voiced by Sean Giambrone) is a gruff pack rat who is Frazz's roommate. Before moving in with Frazz, he lived in a hollow tree with a ground-level entrance which makes the place prone to flooding during rainy weather.
- Lt. Scruffy (voiced by Malcolm-Jamal Warner) is a retired firehouse Dalmatian.
- Snick (voiced by Zack Pearlman) and Wheeze (voiced by Melissa Villaseñor) are two mischievous brown raccoons. They live in the attic of a human house.
- Maizie (voiced by Alison Fernandez) is a cute but crooked sheep who is the main antagonist of the series.
- Nibbles (voiced by Jeff Bennett) is a hare with a fondness for vegetables.
- Scout (voiced by Jack Stanton) is a happy-go-lucky corgi.
- Gizmo (voiced by Olivia Jellen) is a tech-savvy young vixen.
- Monty (voiced by Henry Kaufman) is a black pony.
- Ramona (voiced by Lily Sanfelippo) is a goat who is a close friend of Monty.
- Queen Bae (voiced by Alanna Ubach) is a honeybee who runs a hive where Rebeecca resides. She has a sister who also runs a hive.
- Endicott (voiced by Nat Faxon) is a lizard with a large vocabulary and a passion for art.
- Scoop (voiced by Ramone Hamilton) is a fire chicken who looks and sounds similar to Coop.
- Salty (voiced by Gabriella Graves) is a fire chicken who is the smallest of the group and looks and sounds similar to Sweetie.
- Big Roo (voiced by Maxwell Simkins) is a fire chicken who is the biggest of the group and looks and sounds similar to Little Boo.

=== Guests ===
- Rebeecca (voiced by Rachel Bloom) is a nervous honeybee.
- Quilla (voiced by Chrissie Fit) is a friendly porcupine.
- Cornelius (voiced by Jet Jurgensmeyer) is the Chicken Squad's cousin who paints pictures at high fidelity that anyone who sees his works could mistake them for reality.
- Dash (voiced by Luke Lowe) and Chance (voiced by Addison Andrews) are two grey raccoons who are the younger cousins of Snick and Wheeze.

== Episodes ==
No.	Title	Directed by	Written by	Storyboarded by	Original release date	Prod. code	U.S. viewers (millions)
1	"Chicken Squad to the Rescue"	James Burks	Tom Rogers	Bill Breneisen	May 14, 2021	101	0.28
1	"A Speedy Exit"	Mike Kunkel	Rachel Ruderman	David Chlystek	May 14, 2021	101	0.28
2	"The Natural"	James Burks & Kimberly Jo Mills	John N. Huss	Becky Cassady	May 14, 2021	103	N/A
2	"A Dirty Job"	Monica Tomova	Mia Resella	Jeff Gordon & Kevin Pawlak	May 14, 2021	103	N/A
3	"Gone to the Dogs"	Monica Tomova	Mia Resella	John West	May 21, 2021	110	0.44
3	"Coop Dreams"	Arielle Yett	John N. Huss	Bill Breneisen	May 21, 2021	110	0.44
4	"Roommate Rumble"	Kimberly Jo Mills	Karissa Valencia	Tamal Hanley	May 28, 2021	111	0.40
4	"The Need for Speed"	Monica Tomova	John N. Huss	Lauren Krieger	May 28, 2021	111	0.40
5	"Critter Sitters"	Arielle Yett	Karissa Valencia	Becky Cassady	June 4, 2021	109	0.39
5	"The Problamatic Puppy"	Kimberly Jo Mills	Sindy Boveda Spackman	Kelly Bishop	June 4, 2021	109	0.39
6	"The Squirrel Next Door"	Kimberly Jo Mills	Mia Resella	Kristen Pileri	June 11, 2021	105	0.40
6	"The Stakeout Mistake"	Arielle Yett	Karissa Valencia	Tamal Hanley	June 11, 2021	105	0.40
7	"Feather Fever"	James Burks	Karissa Valencia	John West	June 18, 2021	104	0.29
7	"The Big Parade"	Arielle Yett & Kimberly Jo Mills	John N. Huss	Dave Chylstek	June 18, 2021	104	0.29
8	"Monkey Business"	Kimberly Jo Mills	Mia Resella	Tamal Hanley	July 2, 2021	108	0.27
8	"Tech Trouble"	Monica Tomova	Mia Resella	Kristen Pileri	July 2, 2021	108	0.27
9	"Tully's Troublesome Trainee"	Arielle Yett	Mia Resella	Rory Smith	July 16, 2021	112	0.23
9	"Sweetie Undercover"	Kimberly Jo Mills	Karissa Valencia	Becky Cassady & Kristen Pileri	July 16, 2021	112	0.23
10	"A Visit from the Bearded Dragon"	Monica Tomova & Patrick Pakula	John N. Huss	Bill Breneisen	August 6, 2021	113	0.36
10	"The Bark Files"	Arielle Yett	Mia Resella	Katya Bowser & John West	August 6, 2021	113	0.36
11	"Honey Bee Boogie Woogie"	Kimberly Jo Mills	James Eason Garcia	Lauren Krieger	August 13, 2021	114	0.28
11	"Willow in the Wild"	Monica Tomova & Patrick Pakula	Karissa Valencia	Kristen Pileri & Rory Smith	August 13, 2021	114	0.28
12	"The Surprise Party Surprise"	Mike Kunkel	Mia Resella	Tamal Hanley	August 20, 2021	102	0.18
12	"U.F.Oh-No"	Kimberly Jo Mills	Karissa Valencia	Kristen Pileri	August 20, 2021	102	0.18
13	"The Great Outdoors"	Arielle Yett	John N. Huss	Tamal Hanley	September 3, 2021	115	0.20
13	"The Hogdog Show"	Kimberly Jo Mills	Mia Resella	Becky Cassady	September 3, 2021	115	0.20
14	"House Guest"	Monica Tomova	Hugh Webber	John West	September 10, 2021	116	0.23
14	"The Wrong Stuff"	Arielle Yett	John N. Huss	Bill Breneisen	September 10, 2021	116	0.23
15	"The Dr. Dirt Show"	Kimberly Jo Mills	Karissa Valencia	Lauren Krieger & Rory Smith	September 24, 2021	117	0.23
15	"Capture the Flag"	Patrick Pakula	Mia Resella	Kristen Pileri	September 24, 2021	117	0.23
16	"T-Wrecks"	Monica Tomova	Karissa Valencia	Kevin Pawlak, John West & Katya Bowser	October 1, 2021	107	0.26
16	"Trick or Eek"	Arielle Yett	James Eason Garcia	Bill Breneisen	October 1, 2021	107	0.26
17	"Hidden Treasure"	Arielle Yett	John N. Huss	Janice Rim	October 15, 2021	118	0.21
17	"Cold Case"	Kimberly Jo Mills	Karissa Valencia	Rory Smith	October 15, 2021	118	0.21
18	"Dino Dig"	Patrick Pakula	Lance Whinery	John West	November 12, 2021	119	0.17
18	"Runaway Robot"	Arielle Yett	John N. Huss	Renee Badua & Laur Uy	November 12, 2021	119	0.17
19	"Artistic Differences"	Kimberly Jo Mills	Karissa Valencia	Lauren Krieger	November 19, 2021	120	N/A
19	"Rush Hour"	Patrick Pakula	Mia Resella	Janice Rim & John West	November 19, 2021	120	N/A
20	"Merry Chickmas"	Kimberly Jo Mills	John N. Huss	Kelly Bishop	November 27, 2021	106	0.24
20	"Feed the Brrrrds"	Kimberly Jo Mills	John N. Huss	Becky Cassady	November 27, 2021	106	0.24
21	"Sheep on the Lamb"	Arielle Yett	John N. Huss	Rory Smith	December 3, 2021	121	0.13
21	"The Chic Chick"	Kimberly Jo Mills	James Eason Garcia	Janice Rim	December 3, 2021	121	0.13
22	"The Lemonade Letdown"	Patrick Pakula	Karissa Valencia	Renee Badua	December 10, 2021	122	0.19
22	"The Prankster Returns"	Arielle Yett	Mia Resella	John West	December 10, 2021	122	0.19
23	"Little Boo's Caper"	Elliot M. Bour	James Eason Garcia	Janice Rim; Tammy Manis (song only)	January 7, 2022	123	0.24
23	"Out of Sight"	Greg Rankin	John N. Huss	John West	January 7, 2022	123	0.24
24	"Scout Out"	Greg Rankin	Andy Guerdat	Renee Badua; Tammy Manis (song only)	January 28, 2022	124	0.15
24	"A Royal Adventure"	Elliot M. Bour	Kelly Lynne D'Angelo	Melissa Suber	January 28, 2022	124	0.15
25	"Tully Trouble"	Kelsey Norden	John N. Huss	Lila Martinez	February 18, 2022	125	0.24
25	"Porcu-Popper"	Kelsey Norden	Story by : Kelly Lynne D’Angelo; Teleplay by : Rachel Ruderman	Federico Etchegaray; Tammy Manis (song only)	February 18, 2022	125	0.24
26	"Where in the Woods Is Pinky?"	Greg Rankin	Andy Guerdat	Janice Rim	February 25, 2022	126	0.19
26	"Sweet as Pie"	Elliot M. Bour	James Eason Garcia	John West; Tammy Manis (song only)	February 25, 2022	126	0.19
27	"Fired Up"	Roy Burdine	Andy Guerdat	Renee Badua	March 18, 2022	127	N/A
27	"Picture Perfect"	Kelsey Norden	James Eason Garcia	Kelsey Norden	March 18, 2022	127	N/A
28	"Field Day Hooray"	Greg Rankin	John N. Huss	Lila Martinez & Federico Etchegaray	April 15, 2022	128	0.26
28	"No Calm Before the Storm"	Elliot M. Bour	Andy Guerdat	Janice Rim; John West (song only)	April 15, 2022	128	0.26
29	"A Hard Day for Mr. Hardshell"	Roy Burdine	James Eason Garcia	Renee Badua; Tammy Manis (song only)	April 22, 2022	129	N/A
29	"The Doctor is In"	Kelsey Norden	Lizzie Prestel	Lila Martinez & Federico Etchegaray	April 22, 2022	129	N/A

== Release ==
The Chicken Squad premiered on Disney Junior in the United States on May 14, 2021. It was later made available to watch on DisneyNOW.

On May 28, 2023, the series was permanently removed from the Disney+ streaming service as a cost-cutting measure.

== Reception ==
Common Sense Media gave the show a 4 out of 5 stars.
