= Mira, Royal Detective =

2020 Disney animated TV series

- Genre: Mystery; Comedy; Musical
- Created by: Becca Topol
- Developed by: Becca Topol
- Showrunner: Sascha Paladino
- Voices of: Leela Ladnier; Kal Penn; Utkarsh Ambudkar
- Theme music composer: Matthew Tishler; Jeannie Lurie
- Opening theme: "Mira, Royal Detective Main Title Theme"
- Ending theme: "Mira, Royal Detective Main Title Theme" (Instrumental)
- Composer: Amritha Vaz
- Country of origin: United States
- Original language: English
- No. of seasons: 2
- No. of episodes: 54 (104 segments) (list of episodes)

Production
- Executive producers: Sascha Paladino; Richard Marlis; Carmen Italia
- Running time: 22 minutes (two 11-minute segments per half-hour)
- Production company: Wild Canary Animation (Note: Animation outsourced to Technicolor Animation Productions)

Original release
- Network: Disney Channel; Disney Junior; DisneyNOW (season 2)
- Release: March 20, 2020 – June 20, 2022

Mira, Royal Detective is an American 3D-animated mystery children's television series created and developed by Becca Topol, and produced by Wild Canary Animation, which is inspired by Indian culture and customs. The show's protagonist, Mira, is the first Indian protagonist in a Disney Junior show. (Note: Dorothea Gerassimova, the show's art director, said, in an interview, that she was glad that Mira was not a princess, that she always works with her team to find solutions, and praised the emphasis on the show "on family values and multigenerational bonds.") It premiered on the Disney Junior channel and programming block in the United States on March 20, 2020.

On December 12, 2019, the show was renewed for a second season prior to the first season's debut. The second season premiered April 5, 2021 on Disney Junior and DisneyNOW. The series finale aired on June 20, 2022.

== Plot ==
Set in a fictional kingdom called Jalpur which resembles the late 19th century version of India, the series follows the brave and resourceful girl Mira, a commoner who is appointed to the role of royal detective by the queen Shanti and travels throughout her kingdom to help royals and commoners alike. Joining Mira are her two mongoose sidekicks Mikku and Chikku.

== Characters ==
=== Main ===
- Mira (voiced by Leela Ladnier) is the titular protagonist who was appointed by Queen Shanti to be a royal detective in Jalpur after solving a mystery that involved saving the kingdom's young prince. The royal detective before her was a man named "Gupta" as revealed in the episode "The Mystery of the Secret Room" but it is not known why he stopped being the royal detective or what happened to him, while Queen Shanti, in other episodes, refers to the fact there have been royal detectives in the past.
- Mikku (voiced by Kal Penn) is a mongoose who helps Mira on her cases. Chikku is his brother.
- Chikku (voiced by Utkarsh Ambudkar) is another mongoose who helps Mira and is the brother of a fellow mongoose, Mikku.

=== Recurring ===
- Queen Shanti (voiced by Freida Pinto) is the Queen of Jalpur and views Mira, who she chose to be the royal detective, to be like a daughter. Prince Neel and Veer are her sons.
- Prince Neel (voiced by Kamran Lucas) is a friend of Mira, others in Jalpur, Prince Veer's younger brother, and is a brilliant, talented inventor. He often flies around the city in his "flycycle", a machine that allows someone to fly by pedalling into the air. He also seems to have a little crush on Mira.
- Prince Veer (voiced by Karan Brar) is a friend of Mira, Prince Neel's older brother, and the aspiring King of Jalpur. Note: both princes catch phrase is, "Soggy Samosas!" They say it whenever something isn't going right.
- Priya (voiced by Roshni Edwards) is Mira's cousin, is very creative and aware of fashion, allowing her to make her own clothes.
- Pinky (voiced by Hannah Simone) is a commoner and friend of Mira who has a pet goat named Pari. Mira calls her a "goat expert". In one episode, she sings a song about what it would be like to be a goat. Pinky also helps trains ponies for polo matches.
- Sahil (voiced by Aasif Mandvi) is Mira's widowed father who often calls her "beti" when talking with her. His wife died some time before the series.
- Sanjeev Joshi (voiced by Danny Pudi) is a music teacher and owner of a music shop in the city. He has a goat named Bhavna.
- Meena (voiced by Aparna Nancherla) is a cousin of Mira and always wants to have good outfits. She is also, apparently, very good at archery, is Priya's older sister, and has a peacock named Koo. As such, she is Mira's cousin, like Priya.
- Dhruv Sharma (voiced by Julian Zane) is a friend of Mira and he has a goat named Bhanu.
- Ranjeet (voiced by Maulik Pancholy) and Manjeet (voiced by Karan Soni) are two brothers who live in the city and work at a bicycle shop.
- Kamala (voiced by Avantika Vandanapu) is a young girl who is a friend of Mira and works in a chai shop in town. Her younger sister's name is Dimple.
- Dimple (voiced by Audyssie James) is a young girl who is Mira's friend, and Kamala's younger sister. She calls Mikku and Chikku "gooses."
- Manish (voiced by Parvesh Cheena) and Poonam (voiced by Sonal Shah) are two bandits in Jalpur. They often try and steal items for their own benefit, usually wearing disguises while doing so, but are always foiled by Mira and her friends. Cheena called the bandits "misunderstood," saying that Manish usually wants to just get snacks and food, with robbery as a "means to an end," while Shah said that Poonam has a life goal to "be in control."
- Deputy Oosha is a female cow who is a police officer in Jalpur.
- Chotu (voiced by Allagio James) is Priya and Meena's younger brother and Mira's little cousin.
- Detective Gupta (voiced by Iqbal Theba), a famous detective that sometimes helps Mira solve her cases.

=== Other ===
- Palace Tailor (voiced by Sarayu Blue) is a tailor who works in the royal palace.
- Great-Aunt Rupa (voiced by Sarita Choudhury) is Prince Neel's great-aunt.
- Auntie Pushpa (voiced by Jameela Jamil) is the aunt of Mira and mom of Priya, Meena, and Chotu.
- Preeti (voiced by Saara Chaudry) and Neeti (voiced by Nahanni Mitchell) are two cousins of Mikku and Chikku and are very athletic, skilled in rope gymnastics.
- Sandeep (voiced by Adi Ash) is Mira's friend.
- Princess Shivani (voiced by Shavanie Jayna) is a princess of the kingdom of Nayapuram.
- Ram Sing Ji (voiced by Huse Madhavji) is a royal guard who often helps protect the palace in Jalpur and occasionally helps Mira in her detective work.
- King of Nayapuram (voiced by Husein Madhavji) is the king of the neighboring kingdom of Nayapuram. Shivani is his daughter.
- Queen of Nayapuram (voiced by Tiya Sircar) is the queen of the neighboring kingdom of Nayapuram. Shivani is her daughter.

== Episodes ==
| Season | Segments | Episodes | Originally released | |
| Season | Segments | Episodes | First released | Last released |
|---|---|---|---|---|
| 1 | 50 | 25 | March 20, 2020 | March 27, 2021 |
| 2 | 54 | 29 | April 5, 2021 | June 20, 2022 |

== Production ==
Sascha Paladino, previously a writer for Doc McStuffins, told the Associated Press in March 2020 that they wanted the series to "feel authentic" and that they did that by including "as many South Asian voices in the process as possible." He hoped that the show would, for those who aren't South Asian, allow them to see "a new and interesting culture that hopefully they'll want to explore," and said that he believed that the characters are universal enough that "all kids can relate to the stories." Shagorika Ghosh Perkins of IW Group as a cultural consultant, a Bollywood dancer named Nakul Dev Mahajan, and other designers, musicians, writers, those working in the animation studio in India, were consulted in making the show. The series was created for kids ages 2 to 7, with each of Mira's decisions encouraging "critical thinking and deductive reasoning in young viewers" in the view of Romper. Paladino also stated that the show's crew was "inspired by the Indian culture on every level."

The show is developed by Becca Topol, who previously worked on Elena of Avalor, who is also the story editor. Perkins, the show's cultural consultant, called the show a "celebration of Indian and South Asian culture," and added that she is glad that her daughter's generation will "have a character and role model to identify with and look up to." She further said the show allows South Asian children to "see themselves on television" and that those new to the culture will be "exposed to it in a fun and accessible way."

=== Music ===
Deepak Ramapriyan, a Baltimore-born musician whose parents are immigrants from India, is the orchestrator and music consultant for the show. In March 2020, he told the Baltimore Sun that when listening to the music score for the series he sometimes feels like he is dreaming and said that seeing everything about the series is "mindblowing." He also described the show, to the Sun, as a "full-on sharing Indian culture in all of its aspects," saying that viewers are now able to "see the vast and rich magic and color of India, and have it expressed in such a beautiful way," calling this a major positive. One of the voice actors, Shah, called the music catchy and easy to dance to, while Cheena, another voice actor, was happy that the music is done in such a way that parents, and kids, can be involved and interested in it. Apart from this, Amritha Vaz is the music composer for the series.

Paladino also said that to prepare for the show they watched a lot of Bollywood films which have huge musical numbers, so they decided to depict that in the animation with dancing by lots of characters while using "authentic Indian music and instruments." Nakul Dev Mahajan, a Bollywood choreographer, who worked on the show, said he gets the script and music, talks with the writers and crew of the show, choreographs the piece, videotapes himself and assistants, then send those videos to the team, with the artists animating the movements of his body and that of his assistants. He was also appreciative that the team working on the show, with many interested in Bollywood dancing, and said that the show celebrates styles of Indian dance from various regions across the country.

=== Visual art ===
The art director for the series, Dorothea Gerassimova, says that she was inspired and energized to convey the beautiful patterns, culture, and art in India, calling it a "fantastic opportunity to create this wonderful, stylized world." She also noted that the show was able to weave in inspiration from "Indian architecture, art, colors, fabrics and patterns" along with detailed architecture and art from India.

=== Voice acting ===
Ladnier, when interviewed by the Associated Press, called the show a "pretty good start to a career" and said that the show is a reminder of "how beautiful" Indian culture is. Additionally, Kal Penn expressed his excitement over the show, saying that the current generation is going be a group of kids "for whom this is going to be normal," without the emotional baggage of a lack of representation in the past. Frieda Pinto called the show important for Indian, South Asian, and Desi kids, while Utkarsh Ambudkar hoped that the show created the space where "young brown children can watch TV and see themselves," Karan Brar said that it was exciting to push forward more diverse content, while Maulik Pancholy hoped that the show will encourage children to celebrate and explore Indian culture. Sonal Shah called the show special, as it has a lot of meaning behind it, and said that the show is "so awesome" while Parvesh Cheena agreed with her assessment of the show. Shah said that her friend suggested her for the part, and Cheena said that he did "a normal audition" but that the producers offered that he be a bandit with Sonal, which he accepted. In another interview, Cheena said that playing a bandit was a lot of fun. Jameela Jamil, another voice actor, praised that the show is representing "different people from different cultures around the world." The cast of the show is "completely South Asian" and all are from the Indian diaspora as noted by Cheena.

== Release ==
It premiered on Disney Junior in the United States on March 20, 2020, while it premiered in India on March 22. The show had its first international debut in Canada on March 22. It premiered in South Korea on April 29. The following month, on May 24, it premiered on Disney+ Hotstar Premium. It premiered on Disney Junior Asia & Hong Kong on July 3, 2020 (also known as the final program before closing on October 1, 2021).) It premiered in Brazil on July 20, 2020. Later that year, it premiered in Israel on October 2 with Hebrew dubbing, and in Spain and Poland on November 9. It premiered in the United Kingdom, Ireland and Italy on Disney+ on April 2, 2021. It premiered in France and the Netherlands in 2022.

From May 2 to June 20, four specials which celebrate music and dancing from Bollywood were presented on Disney Junior, consisting of the last four episodes of the second and final season of Mira, Royal Detective.

== Reception ==
=== Critical response ===
Shagorika Ghosh Perkins of ColorLines praised the diversity of the series, saying, "Bringing these experiences and stories to a new generation of children will enrich their lives, help to bridge the geographical divide and hopefully activate viewers’ imaginations, stimulate curiosity, and empower young minds to build trust, respect and friendships." Burkely Hermann of I Love Libraries praised the series for positively portraying libraries, as shows like She-Ra and the Princesses of Power, Hilda, Cleopatra in Space, and Too Loud have done, noting specific episodes with library scenes which show the value of libraries and the organization of these institutions. He specifically highlights an episode where Mira is tasked with solving a "library-related mystery" as she pedals a bookmobile across the city, with the characters singing a "sweet song about the importance of reading and libraries" and Mira saying that library materials should be checked out correctly so the "library can keep track of their materials," allowing them to be available to others. Emily Ashby of Common Sense Media rated the show a 4 out of 5 stars. She further noted that the sources authentically incorporates various aspects of Indian culture, while stories challenge Mira and her friends to solve mysteries, and her extended family members are important part of her life, making clear that family isn't limited to her nuclear family. Ashby also praised the lively music and the "right touch of fantasy" like talking animals and flying vehicles for its "young audience."

Some people from the Indian-American community praised the series, calling it "incredible" and "pretty cool" to see representation of themselves on TV, praising the involvement of South Asians in the production process, and singing along with people of all ages and races singing along with the "We're on the case" song.

=== Accolades ===
| Year | Award | Category | Recipient(s) | Result | Ref. |
|---|---|---|---|---|---|
| 2021 | Annie Awards | Outstanding Achievement for Music in an Animated Television / Broadcast Production | Amritha Vaz, Matthew Tishler, Jeannie Lurie | Nominated | |
| 2021 | ASCAP Film and Television Music Awards | Television Score of the Year | Amritha Vaz | Nominated | |
| 2022 | Annie Awards | Outstanding Achievement for Music in an Animated Television / Broadcast Production | Amritha Vaz, Matthew Tishler, Jeannie Lurie | Nominated | |
| 2022 | Television Critics Association Awards | Outstanding Achievement in Youth Programming | Disney Junior | Nominated | |

== See also ==
- Sally Bollywood
