= List of Miles from Tomorrowland episodes =

The following is a list of episodes from the Disney Junior series Miles from Tomorrowland, which lasted from February 6, 2015 until September 10, 2018 with a total of three seasons.

A total of 144 episode segments being combined into 75 half-hour episodes were produced.

== Series overview ==
Season	Segments	Episodes	Originally released	
Season	Segments	Episodes	First released	Last released
1	59	30	February 6, 2015	March 18, 2016
2	46	24	June 20, 2016	August 26, 2017
3	39	21	October 16, 2017	September 10, 2018

== Episodes ==
=== Season 1 (2015–16) ===
No. overall	No. in season	Title	Directed by	Written by	Storyboard by	Original release date	Prod. code	US viewers (millions)
1a	1a	"Runaway Shuttle"	John Eng	Nicole Dubuc	John Eng & Larry Scholl	February 6, 2015	101a	1.02
DVD releases: Miles from Tomorrowland: Let's Rocket!
1b	1b	"Surfin' the Whirlpool"	John Eng	Joe Ansolabehere	Andrei Svislotski	February 6, 2015	101b	1.02
DVD releases: Miles from Tomorrowland: Let's Rocket!
2a	2a	"Journey to the Frozen Planet"	Michael Daedalus Kenny	Sascha Paladino	Monica Tomova	February 6, 2015	102a	0.76
2b	2b	"Attack of the Flickorax"	Michael Daedalus Kenny	Sascha Paladino	Rudi Berden	February 6, 2015	102b	0.76
3a	3a	"Ocean in Motion"	Sue Perrotto	Nicole Dubuc	Derek Lee Thompson, Sue Perrotto, Seung-Hyun Oh & Ken Boyer	February 6, 2015	103a	0.94
DVD releases: Miles from Tomorrowland: Let's Rocket!
3b	3b	"Explorer Exchange"	Sue Perrotto	Greg Johnson	Chris Harmon	February 6, 2015	103b	0.94
DVD releases: Miles from Tomorrowland: Let's Rocket!
4a	4a	"Game On"	John Eng	Nicole Dubuc	Andrei Svislotski	February 6, 2015	104a	0.85
DVD releases: Miles from Tomorrowland: Let's Rocket!
4b	4b	"How I Saved My Summer Vacation"	John Eng	Joe Ansolabehere	Larry Scholl & Jeff McGrath	February 6, 2015	104b	0.85
DVD releases: Miles from Tomorrowland: Let's Rocket!
5a	5a	"Catch That IOTA!"	Michael Daedalus Kenny	Joe Ansolabehere	Rudi Berden	February 13, 2015	105a	0.98
5b	5b	"Mighty Merc"	Michael Daedalus Kenny	Greg Johnson	Monica Tomova	February 13, 2015	105b	0.98
6a	6a	"Who Stole the Stellosphere?"	Sue Perrotto	Greg Johnson	Chris Harmon	February 20, 2015	106a	1.86
DVD releases: Miles from Tomorrowland: Let's Rocket!
6b	6b	"Rock N' Roll"	Sue Perrotto	Lisa Kettle	Carin-Anne Anderson	February 20, 2015	106b	1.86
DVD releases: Miles from Tomorrowland: Let's Rocket!
7a	7a	"Downsized"	John Eng	Story by : Greg Johnson; Written by : Bradley Zweig	Scott Heming	March 20, 2015	107a	1.12
7b	7b	"Ride of the Quarkons"	John Eng	Joe Ansolabehere	Andrei Svislotski	March 20, 2015	107b	1.12
8a	8a	"Happy Captain's Day"	Michael Daedalus Kenny	Nicole Dubuc	Fred Cline	March 20, 2015	108a	1.17
8b	8b	"Planet of the Plants"	Michael Daedalus Kenny	Joe Ansolabehere	Rudi Berden & Jeff McGrath	March 20, 2015	108b	1.17
9a	9a	"To the Goldilocks Zone"	Sue Perrotto	Sascha Paladino	Carin-Anne Anderson	March 20, 2015	109a	1.07
DVD releases: Miles from Tomorrowland: Let's Rocket!
9b	9b	"Hiccup in the Plan"	Sue Perrotto	Nicole Dubuc	Chris Harmon	March 20, 2015	109b	1.07
DVD releases: Miles from Tomorrowland: Let's Rocket!
10a	10a	"On Spaceguard"	John Eng	Sascha Paladino	Scott Heming	April 3, 2015	110a	1.68
10b	10b	"Spaceship Invader"	John Eng	Nicole Dubuc & Eugene Son	Kelly James	April 3, 2015	110b	1.68
11a	11a	"Mama Merc"	Michael Daedalus Kenny	Kevin Hopps	Rudi Berden	May 8, 2015	111a	1.22
11b	11b	"Space Race"	Michael Daedalus Kenny	Greg Johnson	Fred Cline & Jeff McGrath	May 8, 2015	111b	1.22
12a	12a	"Adventures in Robot-Pet Sitting"	Sue Perrotto	Dean Stefan	Chris Harmon	April 17, 2015	112a	1.07
12b	12b	"The Great Blastboard Chase"	Sue Perrotto	Story by : Sascha Paladino; Written by : Bradley Zweig	Carin-Anne Anderson	April 17, 2015	112b	1.07
13a	13a	"Unplugged"	John Eng & Kelly James	Greg Johnson	Andrei Svislotski	April 24, 2015	113a	1.08
13b	13b	"Junked"	John Eng & Kelly James	Story by : Sascha Paladino; Written by : Eugene Son	Kelly James	April 24, 2015	113b	1.08
14a	14a	"The Neptune Adventure"	Michael Daedalus Kenny	Greg Johnson	Jeff McGrath	May 15, 2015	114a	1.02
14b	14b	"Eye to Eye"	Michael Daedalus Kenny	Story by : Nicole Dubuc; Written by : Marsha Griffin	Fred Cline	May 15, 2015	114b	1.02
15a	15a	"Ghost Moon"	Sue Perrotto	Greg Johnson	Chris Harmon	October 10, 2015	115a	1.75
15b	15b	"Stormy Night in a Dark Nebula"	Sue Perrotto	Greg Johnson	Carin-Anne Anderson	October 10, 2015	115b	1.75
16a	16a	"Frozen Food"	Kelly James	Eugene Son & Nicole Dubuc	Andrei Svislotski	July 10, 2015	116a	1.54
16b	16b	"Later, Multivator"	Kelly James	Lisa Kettle	Scott Heming	July 10, 2015	116b	1.54
17a	17a	"Yuri's Night"	Michael Daedalus Kenny	Story by : Sascha Paladino & Nicole Dubuc; Written by : Sascha Paladino & Kevin Hopps	Fred Cline	July 3, 2015	117a	1.71
17b	17b	"I, Stella"	Michael Daedalus Kenny	Greg Johnson	Rudi Berden	July 3, 2015	117b	1.71
18a	18a	"Lunar New Year"	Sue Perrotto	Nicole Dubuc	Chris Harmon	July 17, 2015	118a	1.68
18b	18b	"The Hoverbike Diaries"	Sue Perrotto	Lisa Kettle	Derek Lee Thompson	July 17, 2015	118b	1.68
19a	19a	"The Search for Skellig Ro"	Kelly James & John Eng	Sascha Paladino	Fred Cline	July 24, 2015	119a	1.87
19b	19b	"Endangered Species"	Kelly James & John Eng	Greg Johnson	Scott Heming	July 24, 2015	119b	1.87
20a	20a	"Blasteroid"	Michael Daedalus Kenny	Brian Swenlin	Rudi Berden	August 7, 2015	120a	1.40
20b	20b	"Magnetic Merc"	Michael Daedalus Kenny	Dustin Ferrer	Jeff McGrath	August 7, 2015	120b	1.40
21a	21a	"A Growing Problem"	Sue Perrotto	Eugene Son	Carin-Anne Anderson & Derek Lee Thompson	August 13, 2015	121a	1.40
21b	21b	"The Tardigrade Escapade"	Sue Perrotto	Eugene Son	Chris Harmon	August 13, 2015	121b	1.40
22a	22a	"Miles vs. the Volcano"	Kelly James	Lisa Kettle	Fred Cline	September 19, 2015	122a	1.56
22b	22b	"Scavengers of Mars"	Kelly James	Nicole Dubuc	Andrei Svislotski	September 19, 2015	122b	1.56
23a	23a	"The Discovery Expedition"	Michael Daedalus Kenny	Sascha Paladino	Jeff McGrath, Jeanette Moreno King, Rudi Berden & Ray Smyth	December 4, 2015	123a	0.85
23b	23b	"Snow Globe"	Michael Daedalus Kenny	Greg Johnson	Rudi Berden	December 4, 2015	123b	0.85
24a	24a	"Unexpected Ally"	Sue Perrotto	Nicole Dubuc	Derek Lee Thompson	September 26, 2015	124a	1.50
24b	24b	"Skyrise"	Sue Perrotto	Greg Johnson	Chris Harmon	September 26, 2015	124b	1.50
25a	25a	"Dino World"	Kelly James	Greg Johnson	Andrei Svislotski	October 17, 2015	125a	1.67
25b	25b	"Team Exo-Flex"	Kelly James	Greg Johnson	Fred Cline	October 17, 2015	125b	1.67
26a	26a	"The Pluto Rescue"	Michael Daedalus Kenny	Nicole Dubuc	Jeanette Moreno King	October 24, 2015	126a	1.48
26b	26b	"The Taking of the Solar Express"	Michael Daedalus Kenny	Sascha Paladino	Rudi Berden	October 24, 2015	126b	1.48
27a	27a	"The Space Trader"	Sue Perrotto	Greg Johnson	Chris Harmon	November 7, 2015	127a	1.54
27b	27b	"The Quantum Cup"	Sue Perrotto	Story by : Lisa Kettle; Written by : Dustin Ferrer	Derek Lee Thompson	November 7, 2015	127b	1.54
28a	28a	"The Legend of Sandelion"	Kelly James	Brian Swenlin	Fred Cline	November 14, 2015	128a	1.77
28b	28b	"The Mystery of Atlantix"	Kelly James	Lisa Kettle	Andrei Svislotski	November 14, 2015	128b	1.77
29a	29a	"Escape From the Tethoscape"	Sue Perrotto	Lisa Kettle	Chris Harmon	November 21, 2015	129a	1.39
29b	29b	"The Hitchhiker's Ride Through the Galaxy"	Sue Perrotto	Lisa Kettle	Derek Lee Thompson	November 21, 2015	129b	1.39
After watching a commercial from the Tethoscape, Miles and MERC make it their priority to get Loretta to Alarbus for her guest appearance at Prof. Rubicon's presentation about mysterious rocks left by the Builders and receiving a message from them about a portal. With the help from their friends whom gave them advise along the way.
30	30	"Galactech: Secrets of the Black Hole"	Michael Daedalus Kenny	Greg Johnson & Sascha Paladino	Rudi Berden, Jeanette Moreno King & Ray Smyth	March 18, 2016	130	1.07

=== Season 2: Galactech (2016–17) ===
No. overall	No. in season	Title	Directed by	Written by	Storyboard by	Original release date	Prod. code	US viewers (millions)
31a	1a	"Galactech: Captain Miles"	Sue Perrotto	Lisa Kettle	Chris Harmon	June 20, 2016	201a	0.57
31b	1b	"The Search for Spot"	Michael Daedalus Kenny	Story by : Sascha Paladino; Written by : Len Uhley	Rudi Berden	June 20, 2016	201b	0.57
32a	2a	"The Blobbysitters"	Jeff McGrath	Lisa Kettle	Vitaly Shafirov	June 27, 2016	202a	0.65
32b	2b	"Astro-Cavers"	Sue Perrotto	Greg Johnson	Derek Lee Thompson	June 27, 2016	202b	0.65
33a	3a	"Galactech: How to Build a Robot-Pet"	Michael Daedalus Kenny	Story by : Greg Johnson; Written by : Eugene Son	Fred Cline	July 11, 2016	203a	0.69
33b	3b	"Career Day"	Jeff McGrath	Len Uhley	Tom King	July 11, 2016	203b	0.69
Song: "Shine Bright" sung by Martine
34a	4a	"Galloping Groundshakers"	Sue Perrotto	Story by : Sascha Paladino; Written by : Nicole Dubuc	Kelly James	July 18, 2016	204a	0.68
34b	4b	"Galactech: March of the Robo-Penguins"	Michael Daedalus Kenny	Lisa Kettle	Rudi Berden & Ruolin Li	July 18, 2016	204b	0.68
35a	5a	"The Adventures of Jet Retrograde"	Jeff McGrath	Greg Johnson	Vitaly Shafirov	July 25, 2016	205a	0.60
35b	5b	"The Tiny Aliens"	Sue Perrotto	Sascha Paladino	Chris Harmon	July 25, 2016	205b	0.60
36a	6a	"Galactech: The Galactech Grab"	Michael Daedalus Kenny	Story by : Sascha Paladino; Written by : Len Uhley	Fred Cline	August 1, 2016	206a	0.67
36b	6b	"Galactech: An Admiral Rescue"	Jeff McGrath	Lisa Kettle	Tom King	August 1, 2016	206b	0.67
37a	7a	"Galaxias Quest"	Michael Daedalus Kenny	Sascha Paladino	Ruolin Li	August 8, 2016	207a	0.75
37b	7b	"Galactech: Mission to the Sun"	Sue Perrotto	Written by : Ron Holsey; Story by : Sascha Paladino	Derek Lee Thompson	August 8, 2016	207b	0.75
38a	8a	"The First Day of Galactic School"	Sue Perrotto	Sascha Paladino	Kelly James	September 24, 2016	208a	0.70
38b	8b	"Miles Underwater"	Jeff McGrath	Lisa Kettle	Arthur Valencia	September 24, 2016	208b	0.70
39a	9a	"The Galactic Fair"	Michael Daedalus Kenny	Written by : Len Uhley; Story by : Greg Johnson	Fred Cline & Ray Smyth	October 8, 2016	209a	0.85
39b	9b	"Unfair Getaway"	Jeff McGrath	Story by : Greg Johnson; Written by : Len Uhley	Vitaly Shafirov	October 8, 2016	209b	0.85
40a	10a	"Building Day"	Michael Daedalus Kenny	Story by : Sascha Paladino; Written by : Bob Forward	Ruolin Li	October 15, 2016	210a	0.76
40b	10b	"Galactech: Flight of the Iotas"	Sue Perrotto	Lisa Kettle	Chris Harmon	October 15, 2016	210b	0.76
41a	11a	"Galactech: Still Rocketing"	Jeff McGrath	Len Uhley	Tom King	October 22, 2016	211a	0.92
41b	11b	"Merc's Night Out"	Sue Perrotto	Story by : Greg Johnson; Written by : Rick Suvalle	Derek Lee Thompson	October 22, 2016	211b	0.92
42a	12a	"Space Junkers"	Michael Daedalus Kenny	Kristofer Wellman	Fred Cline	October 29, 2016	212a	0.85
42b	12b	"Help Us, Jet Retrograde!"	Jeff McGrath	Greg Johnson	Arthur Valencia	October 29, 2016	212b	0.85
43a	13a	"Blackout on Bloppsburgh"	Sue Perrotto	Lisa Kettle	Kelly James	November 5, 2016	213a	0.81
43b	13b	"The Robot Thief"	Michael Daedalus Kenny	Story by : Sascha Paladino; Written by : Len Uhley	Ruolin Li & Ray Smyth	November 5, 2016	213b	0.81
44a	14a	"Back in the Groove"	Jeff McGrath	Lisa Kettle	Rudi Berden	November 12, 2016	214a	0.88
Song: "Ditch this Jam" sung by Bootjet Groovestar
44b	14b	"Saving Lumaro"	Sue Perrotto	Sascha Paladino	Chris Harmon	November 12, 2016	214b	0.88
45a	15a	"Galactech: The S'Leet Heist"	Jeff McGrath	Story by : Sascha Paladino & Greg Johnson; Written by : Rick Suvalle	Arthur Valencia	December 3, 2016	215a	0.67
45b	15b	"Galactech: The S'Leet Fleet"	Michael Daedalus Kenny	Greg Johnson	Fred Cline & Ray Smyth	December 3, 2016	215b	0.67
46a	16a	"Once in a Blue Moon"	Jeff McGrath	Story by : Greg Johnson; Written by : Len Uhley	Vitaly Shafirov	February 18, 2017	216a	0.72
46b	16b	"The Queen Gemma Dilemma"	Sue Perrotto	Lisa Kettle	Derek Lee Thompson	February 18, 2017	216b	0.72
47	17	"Galactech: The Mystery of the Dinosaurs"	Michael Daedalus Kenny	Greg Johnson & Sascha Paladino	Fred Cline, Ruolin Li & Ray Smyth	March 25, 2017	217	0.60
48a	18a	"Who Stole the Dinosaur?"	Jeff McGrath	Rick Suvalle	Andrei Svislotski	April 1, 2017	221a	0.58
48b	18b	"Nine Minutes 'Til Bedtime"	Sue Perrotto	Lisa Kettle	Fred Cline & Kelly James	April 1, 2017	221b	0.58
49a	19a	"Chasing the Stormchaser"	Jeff McGrath	Lisa Kettle	Rudi Berden	April 8, 2017	218a	0.61
49b	19b	"Galactech: Loretta's Lost BraceLex"	Sue Perrotto	Lisa Kettle	Kelly James	April 8, 2017	218b	0.61
50a	20a	"Gamechangers"	Michael Daedalus Kenny	Sascha Paladino	Ruolin Li & Ray Smyth	April 15, 2017	219a	0.94
50b	20b	"Goon Baby Goon"	Sue Perrotto	Len Uhley	Chris Harmon	April 15, 2017	219b	0.94
51a	21a	"Beneath Europa"	Jeff McGrath	Lisa Kettle	Arthur Valencia	May 20, 2017	220a	0.54
51b	21b	"Callistos on Ice"	Sue Perrotto	Rick Suvalle	Derek Lee Thompson	May 20, 2017	220b	0.54
52b	22a	"Galactech: The Space Trader Strikes Back"	Michael Daedalus Kenny	Story by : Greg Johnson; Written by : Kristofer Wellman	Ruolin Li & Ray Smyth	June 10, 2017	222a	0.43
52a	22b	"Galactech: The Vanishing Callistos"	Michael Daedalus Kenny	Rick Suvalle	Fred Cline & Ray Smyth	June 10, 2017	222b	0.43
53a	23a	"Galactech: The Search for the Plectrix"	Jeff McGrath	Sascha Paladino	Arthur Valencia	July 8, 2017	223a	N/A
Song: "Plectrix Music" performed by Béla Fleck (banjo)
53b	23b	"Robo-Monkey Business"	Sue Perrotto	Lisa Kettle	Kelly James & Derek Lee Thompson	July 8, 2017	223b	N/A
54	24	"Connect & Protect & Shorts"	Michael Daedalus Kenny	Greg Johnson & Sascha Paladino	Fred Cline, Chris Harmon, Derek Lee Thompson, Ray Smyth, Ruolin Li & Andrei Svislotski	August 26, 2017	TBA	0.72

=== Season 3: Mission Force One (2017–18) ===
The season debuted on October 16, 2017 as Mission Force One.

No. overall	No. in season	Title	Directed by	Written by	Storyboard by	Original release date	Prod. code	US viewers (millions)
55a	1a	"The Great Space Train Robbery"	Sue Perrotto	Sascha Paladino	Eddie Lin	October 16, 2017	302a	0.58
55b	1b	"Mission Pets One"	Jeff McGrath	Lisa Kettle	Jamie Vickers	October 16, 2017	302b	0.58
56a	2a	"Villain After Villain"	Sue Perrotto	Greg Johnson	Kelly James	October 17, 2017	TBA	0.45
56b	2b	"The Discover-Bot Takeover"	Jeff McGrath	Sascha Paladino	Arthur Valencia	October 17, 2017	TBA	0.45
57a	3a	"Invaders from Tomorrowland"	Michael Daedalus Kenny	Story by : Greg Johnson; Written by : Adam Beechen	Derek Lee Thompson	October 18, 2017	TBA	0.38
57b	3b	"Rise of the Mountain Crushers"	Jeff McGrath	Lisa Kettle	Calvin Suggs	October 18, 2017	TBA	0.38
58a	4a	"Battle for the Zenith"	Sue Perrotto	Lisa Kettle	Chris Harmon	October 19, 2017	TBA	N/A
58b	4b	"Mission Force Plus One"	Michael Daedalus Kenny	Story by : Sascha Paladino; Written by : Patrick Rieger	Fred Cline	October 19, 2017	TBA	N/A
59	5	"The Magsteeds of Infurnia"	Jeff McGrath	Greg Johnson	Eddie Lin & Arthur Valencia	October 20, 2017	TBA	N/A
60a	6a	"Stranded in Space"	Jeff McGrath	Story by : Thomas Hart & Kristofer Wellman; Written by : Kristofer Wellman	Jamie Vickers	October 23, 2017	TBA	N/A
60b	6b	"Plant Transplant"	Michael Daedalus Kenny	Lisa Kettle	Ray Smyth	October 23, 2017	TBA	N/A
61a	7a	"How to Build a Better Villain"	Michael Daedalus Kenny	Sascha Paladino	Derek Lee Thompson	October 24, 2017	TBA	N/A
61b	7b	"The Goopopolis Swindle"	Sue Perrotto	Lisa Kettle	Kelly James	October 24, 2017	TBA	N/A
62a	8a	"Bots of Fury"	Sue Perrotto	Kristofer Wellman	Chris Harmon	October 30, 2017	TBA	N/A
62b	8b	"The Accidental Captives"	Jeff McGrath	Written by : James W. Bates; Story by : Greg Johnson	Calvin Suggs	October 30, 2017	TBA	N/A
63a	9a	"The Junk Monster of Planet Crunkle"	Jeff McGrath	Story by : Greg Johnson; Written by : Lisa Kettle	Arthur Valencia	November 13, 2017	TBA	N/A
63b	9b	"The Lost Empire"	Michael Daedalus Kenny	Story by : Greg Johnson; Written by : Kristofer Wellman	Fred Cline	November 13, 2017	TBA	N/A
64a	10a	"Face-Off"	Jeff McGrath	Story by : Greg Johnson; Written by : Jean Ansolabehere	Jamie Vickers	November 27, 2017	TBA	0.49
64b	10b	"The Big Escape"	Sue Perrotto	Story by : Sascha Paladino & Greg Johnson; Written by : Taniya Hossain & Claire Yorita Lee	Eddie Lin & Kurt Anderson	November 27, 2017	TBA	0.49
65a	11a	"Grendel's Moving Castle"	Michael Daedalus Kenny	Lisa Kettle	Derek Lee Thompson	January 8, 2018	312a	0.55
65b	11b	"The Great Gadfly"	Jeff McGrath	Story by : Greg Johnson; Written by : Jean Ansolabehere	Rudi Berden & Calvin Suggs	January 8, 2018	312b	0.55
66a	12a	"Shoom Balla Boom"	Michael Daedalus Kenny	Kristofer Wellman	Fred Cline	January 22, 2018	313a	N/A
66b	12b	"Friend or FoeBot"	Sue Perrotto	Greg Johnson	Chris Harmon	January 22, 2018	313b	N/A
67a	13a	"Deep Trouble"	Jeff McGrath	Lisa Kettle	Arthur Valencia	January 29, 2018	314a	N/A
67b	13b	"Double Trouble"	Sue Perrotto	Kristofer Wellman	Kurt Anderson	January 29, 2018	314b	N/A
68a	14a	"Malison to the Rescue"	Jeff McGrath	Lisa Kettle	Eddie Lin	March 5, 2018	TBA	N/A
68b	14b	"The Last Guardian"	Michael Daedalus Kenny	Kristofer Wellman	Ray Smyth	March 5, 2018	TBA	N/A
69a	15a	"Sidekicks for Hire"	Michael Daedalus Kenny	Lisa Kettle	Derek Lee Thompson	March 12, 2018	TBA	N/A
69b	15b	"The Illumin-Aliens"	Sue Perrotto	Kristofer Wellman	Kelly James	March 12, 2018	TBA	N/A
70a	16a	"Villain Force One"	Sue Perrotto	Greg Johnson	Calvin Suggs & Chris Harmon	March 19, 2018	TBA	N/A
70b	16b	"Villain Force Two"	Sue Perrotto	Greg Johnson	Calvin Suggs & Chris Harmon	March 19, 2018	TBA	N/A
71a	17a	"The Suit Pursuit"	Michael Daedalus Kenny	Kristofer Wellman	Fred Cline & Ray Smyth	March 26, 2018	TBA	N/A
71b	17b	"Operation Groovestar"	Jeff McGrath	Lisa Kettle	Arthur Valencia	March 26, 2018	TBA	N/A
Songs: "Ditch this Jam" & "Hustle in a Groove" sung by Bootjet Groovestar and Mission Force One
72	18	"The Space Station Situation"	Michael Daedalus Kenny	Sascha Paladino & Greg Johnson	Kelly James & Ray Smyth	May 7, 2018	TBA	N/A
Song: "There's a Great Big Beautiful Tomorrow" performed by Matt Mahaffey
73a	19a	"Aggro's Jam"	Michael Daedalus Kenny	Sascha Paladino	Fred Cline	May 14, 2018	TBA	N/A
73b	19b	"Sea Change"	Sue Perrotto	Lisa Kettle	Kurt Anderson	May 14, 2018	TBA	N/A
74a	20a	"Saving Silas"	Jeff McGrath	Lisa Kettle	Eddie Lin	May 21, 2018	TBA	N/A
74b	20b	"Attack of the Arachno-Bots"	Sue Perrotto	Kristofer Wellman	Kelly James	May 21, 2018	TBA	N/A
75	21	"The Nemesystems Takeover"	Michael Daedalus Kenny	Sascha Paladino & Greg Johnson	Derek Lee Thompson, Calvin Suggs & Ray Smyth	September 10, 2018	321	N/A

== Shorts ==
=== Messages from Miles (2015) ===
10 segments released in May 2015:

#	Episode
1	Rule 14: Speed
2	Rule 22: Robots
3	Rule 31: Unpredictable Aliens
4	Rule 33: Bathroom
5	Rule 41: Hygiene
6	Rule 47: Space Manners
7	Rule 65A: Beware of Cute Aliens
8	Rule 78: Communication
9	Rule 79: Floating Food
10	Rule 93: Heavy Weather

=== DJ Melodies (2015) ===
1. Let's Rocket
2. Onward and Upward

=== Mission Force One: Connect and Protect ===
8 segments released on September 8, 2017:

#	Episode
1	The Burrower (debuted on Disney Junior Canada on November 5, 2017)
2	Rarified Air
3	Big Giant Robot
4	Chase Mountain
5	Smash and Grab
6	Sand Trap
7	Hoverbiking
8	Catching the Arkstar
