= Sascha Paladino =

American writer

- Born: Sascha Paladino
- Education: Wesleyan University
- Occupations: Writer, producer
- Years active: 2002–present
- Spouse: Erin Torneo

Sascha Paladino is an American television writer and documentary director. At Nickelodeon, he was the head writer and developer of Ni Hao, Kai-Lan, for which he received a 2010 Daytime Emmy Award nomination. He also wrote for other Nick-produced shows, including Blue's Clues, Oobi (on the Noggin channel), Team Umizoomi, Wonder Pets! and the Nickelodeon revival of Winx Club. Paladino was the director of the documentary Throw Down Your Heart, which was about his half-brother, the banjo player Béla Fleck.

Paladino started working for Disney Junior with the 2013 show Henry Hugglemonster, and he later created Miles from Tomorrowland for the network. He is also the showrunner of Mira, Royal Detective.
