= Wild Canary Animation =

American animation studio

- Industry: Animation
- Founded: 2007; 19 years ago
- Founders: Richard Marlis; Carmen Italia
- Headquarters: Burbank, California, U.S.
- Website: www.wildcanary.com

Wild Canary Animation is an American animation studio located in Burbank, California.

It was founded in 2007 by industry veterans Richard Marlis and Carmen Italia, and is responsible for producing the Disney Jr. animated series Miles from Tomorrowland, whose first season debuted in 2015. The company was also responsible for the second season of Disney Junior's Sheriff Callie's Wild West and some of the commercials for Mucinex.

Wild Canary now produces Puppy Dog Pals, Mira, Royal Detective, The Chicken Squad, and Star Wars: Young Jedi Adventures. Marlis was the former executive VP of Hollywood-based animation studio Ka-Chew/Klasky-Csupo, and Carmen Italia was the founder and marketing executive for Italia Partners.

The studio has produced numerous shows and specials for Disney Jr. with development projects with several studios.

== Filmography ==
=== TV series ===
Show	Premiere date	End date	Co-production	Outsourcer(s)	Network	Notes
Sheriff Callie's Wild West	January 20, 2014	February 14, 2017	Disney Jr.	DQ Entertainment	Disney Junior	Season 2 only
Miles from Tomorrowland	February 6, 2015	September 10, 2018	Disney Jr.	DQ Entertainment	Disney Junior	Renamed as Mission Force One starting in Season 3
Puppy Dog Pals	April 14, 2017	January 20, 2023	Disney Jr.	DQ Entertainment; Snowball Studios; Rainbow CGI	Disney Junior	
The Rocketeer	November 8, 2019	July 25, 2020	Disney Jr.	Icon Creative Studio Inc.	Disney Junior	
Mira, Royal Detective	March 20, 2020	June 20, 2022	Disney Jr.	Technicolor Animation Productions; DQ Entertainment	Disney Junior	
The Chicken Squad	May 14, 2021	April 22, 2022	Disney Jr.	Technicolor Animation Productions	Disney Junior	
Star Wars: Young Jedi Adventures	May 4, 2023	December 8, 2025	Lucasfilm Animation; Lucasfilm; Disney Jr.	Icon Creative Studio Inc.	Disney+ Disney Jr.	
Minnie's Bow-Toons: Camp Minnie	June 21, 2023	July 31, 2024	Disney Television Animation; Disney Jr.	Mikros Animation	Disney Jr.	Short-form series
Ariel	June 26, 2024	present	Disney Jr.	Superprod Animation; Icon Creative Studio Inc.	Disney Jr.	

=== TV specials ===
Special	Release date	Co-production	Outsourcer(s)	Network	Notes
Mickey and the Very Many Christmases	December 1, 2024	Disney Kids & Family	Icon Creative Studio Inc.	Disney Jr.	
Mickey's Home Alone	Late 2026	Disney Kids & Family	Icon Creative Studio Inc.	Disney Jr.	
