= Disney Junior (Southeast Asia) =

Defunct Southeast Asian television channel

- Broadcast area: Singapore (until 31 May 2020); Malaysia (until 31 December 2020); South Korea (until 30 September 2021); Rest of Southeast Asia, Hong Kong, Bangladesh, and parts of Oceania (until 30 September 2021); Taiwan (block; until 31 December 2021)
- Headquarters: Corporate office: 1 Fusionopolis View, #06-01 Sandcrawler Building, Singapore 138577; Studio and production facility: 4 Loyang Ln #01-01/02 and #02-01/02., Singapore 508914

Programming
- Languages: English; Chinese (Cantonese/Mandarin); Malaysian; Indonesian; Thai; Vietnamese (voice over)
- Picture format: HDTV 1080i; (downscaled to 480i/576i for the SDTV feed)

Ownership
- Owner: The Walt Disney Company (Southeast Asia) Pte. Ltd.
- Sister channels: Disney Channel; Disney XD

History
- Founded: 2 July 2001; 25 years ago (as a programming block on Disney Channel)
- Launched: 2 April 2004; 22 years ago (first broadcast in Hong Kong and Indonesia; as Playhouse Disney); 11 July 2011; 15 years ago (as Disney Junior)
- Closed: 1 June 2020; 6 years ago (Singapore); 1 January 2021; 5 years ago (Malaysia); 1 October 2021; 5 years ago (Pan-Asian feed, Hong Kong programming block); 31 December 2021; 4 years ago (Taiwan; programming block)
- Replaced by: Disney+ (de facto)
- Former names: Playhouse Disney (2004–2011)

Disney Junior was a Southeast Asian preschool pay television channel owned by the Walt Disney Company Southeast Asia that was broadcast from 2 April 2004 to 31 December 2021. Aimed mainly at children between ages 2 to 7 years old, its programming consisted of original first-run television series and films (either theatrically or home video released, or made-for-television), as well as other select third-party programming.

Launched in 2004 as Playhouse Disney, Disney Junior also served as an early morning program block seen on Disney Channel, where it was branded as Disney Junior on Disney Channel until 31 July 2018. The channel closed in 2021, due to the launch of Disney+ in the region.

== History ==
=== Launch ===
The Asian version of Playhouse Disney started in 2 July 2001, as a block on Disney Channel, with plans for the standalone channel beginning in October 2002. It was launched as a channel for Hong Kong and Indonesia on 2 April 2004, with an aim of reaching more territories in South East Asia and Korea. From 2004 to 2005, it expanded in several Southeast Asian countries. Singapore became the third country to receive the channel, launching on StarHub TV on 15 May 2004. It was followed by Korea in June 2004, Malaysia in early July 2004, Brunei in late August, alongside Disney Channel, on Kristal-Astro, Cambodia in June 2005, along with Disney Channel, Vietnam in May 2005, also with Disney Channel, on Hanoi Cable and Ho Chi Minh Cable, entirely in English without Vietnamese dubbing, in a market that at the time had an under-14 population of 24 million; and the Philippines in December 2005, with a separate feed. It was the first preschool-oriented television channel in Southeast Asia, with Nick Jr. and Cartoonito launching years later.

On 11 July 2011, Playhouse Disney was rebranded as Disney Junior.

Due to increasing localization of the Indian feeds of Disney Channel and Disney XD, they were banned from broadcasting in Bangladesh in 2013. However, in 2016, the Southeast Asian feeds of the Disney channels, including Disney Junior Asia, became available on certain cable operators in Bangladesh.

=== Closure ===
On 1 June 2020, Disney Channel, Disney XD and Disney Junior closed in Singapore on both Singtel and StarHub after failing the contract renewal with both service providers in the country.

On 5 August 2020, Disney Junior upgraded to HD on Astro alongside Disney Channel. On 1 January 2021, the channels closed on Astro and Astro-owned television providers (including NJOI and Kristal-Astro) in Malaysia due to the launch of Astro's new children's offerings, which was announced on 14 December 2020, and excluded the Disney channels.

On 1 October 2021, Disney Junior, along with Disney Channel, and most of its Fox-branded channels in Southeast Asia and Hong Kong closed at 12:00 midnight (Jakarta/Bangkok time), due to the launch of Disney+ in the region. The last program to air on the channel was Mira, Royal Detective.

The Disney Junior block in Taiwan on Disney Channel continued to air until 31 December 2021, when Disney Channel closed in Taiwan the following day.

Most Disney Junior shows were moved to Disney+ in selected territories.

== Final feeds ==
Broadcast feed	Availability	Launched	Type	Broadcast language(s)	Closed/replaced
Asia	Indonesia	2 April 2004 (Playhouse Disney); 11 July 2011 (Disney Junior)	Television channel	English, Indonesian, Malay, Thai, Vietnamese (voice over)	1 October 2021
Asia	Singapore	15 May 2004 (Playhouse Disney); 11 July 2011 (Disney Junior)	Television channel	English, Indonesian, Malay, Thai, Vietnamese (voice over)	1 June 2020
Asia	Malaysia	3 July 2004 (Playhouse Disney); 11 July 2011 (Disney Junior)	Television channel	English, Indonesian, Malay, Thai, Vietnamese (voice over)	1 January 2021
Asia	Brunei	8 August 2004 (Playhouse Disney); 11 July 2011 (Disney Junior)	Television channel	English, Indonesian, Malay, Thai, Vietnamese (voice over)	1 January 2021
Asia	Thailand	20 January 2005 (Playhouse Disney); 11 July 2011 (Disney Junior)	Television channel	English, Indonesian, Malay, Thai, Vietnamese (voice over)	1 October 2021
Asia	Vietnam	3 May 2005 (Playhouse Disney); 11 July 2011 (Disney Junior)	Television channel	English, Indonesian, Malay, Thai, Vietnamese (voice over)	1 October 2021
Asia	Cambodia	20 June 2005 (Playhouse Disney); 11 July 2011 (Disney Junior)	Television channel	English, Indonesian, Malay, Thai, Vietnamese (voice over)	1 October 2021
Asia	Philippines	3 December 2005 (Playhouse Disney); 11 July 2011 (Disney Junior)	Television channel	English, Indonesian, Malay, Thai, Vietnamese (voice over)	1 October 2021
Asia	Papua New Guinea	11 July 2011	Television channel	English, Indonesian, Malay, Thai, Vietnamese (voice over)	1 October 2021
Asia	Myanmar	11 July 2011	Television channel	English, Indonesian, Malay, Thai, Vietnamese (voice over)	1 October 2021
Asia	Bangladesh	11 May 2016	Television channel	English, Indonesian, Malay, Thai, Vietnamese (voice over)	1 October 2021
Asia	Multiple Asian markets	January 20, 2000 (Playhouse Disney); 11 July 2011 (Disney Junior)	Programming block on Disney Channel	Multiple	31 July 2018
Hong Kong		2 April 2004 (Playhouse Disney); 11 July 2011 (Disney Junior)	Television channel	Cantonese, English	1 October 2021
Taiwan		3 September 2004 (Playhouse Disney); 1 September 2011 (Disney Junior)	Programming block on Disney Channel Taiwan	Taiwanese Mandarin, English	31 December 2021

== Disney Junior Magazine Philippines ==
Disney Junior Magazine Philippines (known as Disney Junior Magazine and originally known as Playhouse Disney Magazine Philippines) was an educational magazine published in the Philippines by Summit Media in collaboration with The Walt Disney Company Southeast Asia.

== Logos ==
2004–2011
