= Star World (Philippine TV channel) =

Television network in the Philippines

Star World Philippines
- Country: Philippines
- Broadcast area: Philippines
- Network: Fox Networks Group (Philippines)

Programming
- Picture format: 480i/576i (SDTV 16:9, 4:3), 1080i (HDTV)

Ownership
- Owner: 21st Century Fox (STAR TV, Fox Networks Group) (OmniContent Management, Inc.)
- Sister channels: Fox Filipino, Channel V Philippines, Fox Sports, Fox Philippines, Fox Movies Philippines, Fox Family Movies

History
- Launched: December 15, 1991 as STAR Plus; April 1, 1996 as STAR World (relaunched in mid-2000s as a Philippine-exclusive feed)
- Closed: October 1, 2017
- Replaced by: Fox Life Philippines

Star World Philippines (stylized as StarWorld, formerly stylized in all capital letters) was a 24-hour English language cable and satellite television network owned by STAR TV and Fox Networks Group, fully owned subsidiaries of 21st Century Fox. The channel is the successor of STAR Plus, a subsidiary of 21st Century Fox. Star World syndicates several popular shows from the United States, United Kingdom and sometimes from Australia to appeal to the English-speaking population of the Philippines.

== History ==
Star World (then known as STAR Plus) was STAR's English language entertainment channel which has started its operations on 1 January 1994 and its Indonesia counterpart was Film Indonesia and India was Zee TV. But after STAR ended its partnership with Soraya Intercine Films and Zee Telefilm, STAR changed its content from STAR Plus to launch as STAR World on 31 March 1996 which then was known as STAR PLUS International for a brief time (STAR Plus in India was once combine both US and Hindi entertainment until its full transform into a Hindi entertainment channel on 1 July 2000 after its contract with Zee TV ended the previous day).

In the mid-2000s, STAR replaced Star World's main feed (Southeast Asia) with a Philippine-dedicated feed for Filipino viewers.

Star World Philippines was rebranded as FOX Life Philippines on October 1, 2017. However it was shut down on October 1, 2021.

== See also ==
- Star World
