= Pacific Broadcasting Services Fiji =

Defunct Fiji subscription television company

Pacific Broadcasting Services - PBS TV
- Company type: Private
- Industry: Telecommunications
- Founded: 2005
- Headquarters: Suva, Fiji
- Area served: Fiji
- Products: Direct Broadcast Satellite
- Owner: Pacific Broadcasting Services Pty Ltd
- Website: http://www.pbstv.tv

Pacific Broadcasting Services was a company jointly owned by City West Centre Broadcasting Services and BPHCL. Its core business is to deliver satellite subscription television and radio broadcasting services to the Fiji Islands and surrounding markets, focussing on both Hindi and English speaking households and commercial outlets.

The company officially opened business in March 2005. The company is located in Garden City, a growing business district of Suva, the capital of Fiji where it runs its local operation in Sales and Marketing, Customer Care Centre, Service and Installation and Finance. Its Technical Infrastructure and engineering support is based in Sydney, Australia.

PBS TV currently broadcasts on the Intelsat 701 satellite broadcasting to the Fiji Islands with 13 TV Channels and one radio channel. Channels are beamed from Sydney, Australia from the City West Centre where all PBS TV channels are received and broadcast to the Intelsat 18 satellite to be viewed in Fiji.

Pacific Broadcasting Services recently acquired a television broadcasting licence in Fiji to commence broadcasting a nationwide Free To Air channel for Fijian viewers.

In June 2008 PBS started to roll out new technology upgrades to their systems, specifically a new CAS system for their pay television platform.

PBS closed its operations in Fiji and turned off its satellite transmission in July 2012. Consumer Council of Fiji CEO Premila Kumar said PBS had taken money in advance from subscribers and failed to provide services which was illegal.

== Channels ==
Pacific Broadcasting Services offered these channels for subscription:

English Channels:

- Eurosport Asia Pacific
- AXN Asia
- Nickelodeon
- Australia Plus
- Sony Channel (Asia)
- National Geographic
- Nat Geo Wild
- Nat Geo People
- Al Jazeera English
- Times Now
- Animax
- Channel NewsAsia
- euronews
- FashionTV
- MTV Asia
- HBO
- Cinemax
- RED by HBO
- FOX Life
- FOX Movies
- Fox Action Movies
- Fox Family Movies
- Baby TV
- Nick Jr.

Eastern Asian Channels:

- STAR Chinese Channel
- STAR Chinese Movies
- tvN
- KBS World

Indian Channels:

- Zee TV
- Colors
- Star Utsav
- Star Gold
- &TV
- STAR Bharat
- Zee News
- Zee Cinema
- STAR Plus
- Sony SAB
- NDTV India
- MTV India
- STAR Vijay
- Sony MAX
- Sony Entertainment Television (India)

Radio Channels:

- BBC World Service
- AIR FM Gold
