= Fox Movies (TV channel) =

International television channel

- Country: United States

Programming
- Picture format: 1080i (HDTV)

Ownership
- Owner: The Walt Disney Company
- Parent: Fox Networks Group
- Sister channels: Fox; Fox Life; Fox Crime; Fox Comedy; FX; National Geographic; Nat Geo Wild; BabyTV

History
- Launched: February 8, 2007; 19 years ago (MENA)
- Replaced: Fox Movie Channel (USA, namesake); Fox Next (Portugal); Melody Movies (Arab World)
- Closed: 1 March 2024; 2 years ago (MENA)
- Replaced by: FX Movie Channel (USA); Star Movies (Balkans and Portugal); Star Films (Middle East and North Africa) Star Hits (Latin America)

Fox Movies was an international brand of movie channels owned by Fox Networks Group, a part of Walt Disney Direct-to-Consumer & International. The channel was launched on February 8, 2007.

== History ==
FXM: Movies from Fox channel in the US was renamed to Fox Movie Channel on March 1, 2000 until September 2013 when the channel changed its name back to FXM.

In 2008, Fox Movies was launched by Fox International Channels and Rotana Media Services along with Fox Series channels in the Middle East market. Fox then purchased a stake in Rotana, while the joint venture agreed with Disney to carry Disney and American Broadcasting Company content on the two channels for four years. In early March 2010, Fox International Channels agreed to move its Middle East and North Africa market channels' operations from Hong Kong and other locations to an Abu Dhabi facility. On 1 July 2011, Fox Movies was made available in Portugal on pay services and Angola and Mozambique on free-to-air.

On July 1, 2011, Fox Movies was launched by Fox International Channels Portugal with airing many genres including drama, comedy, science fiction, action and horror with programming during the summer slate included hits such as X-Men and The Queen.

On January 1, 2012, Star Movies was rebranded to Fox Movies Premium and FOX Movies Premium HD, available in Hong Kong and selected Southeast Asian countries. In India, China, Middle East and North Africa, Taiwan and the Philippines (SD only), the Star Movies brand remained until July 2017 when was rebranded to Fox Movies.

On October 2, 2012, Fox International Channels would launch another Fox Movies with being available to Albania, Bosnia and Herzegovina, Bulgaria, Croatia, Macedonia, Montenegro, Serbia, Slovenia and Kosovo regions.

On June 7, 2023, Disney announced that it would launch Star Movies in the Balkans as a replacement for Fox Movies in the region on 1 October 2023. Disney would later announce that it would also replace Fox Movies in Portugal (including Angola and Mozambique) on February 7, 2024, due to the acquisition of 21st Century Fox by Disney in 2019.

On March 1, 2024, Fox Movies was rebranded as Star Films in the Middle East and North Africa.

== Fox Movies around the world ==
Market	Type	Formerly	Launch date	Replacement	Replaced date	Other
United States	channel, basic cable	FXM: Movies from Fox	March 1, 2000	FXM	September 2013	—N/a
Middle East	channel, subscription via beIN Channels Network	—N/a	May 1, 2008	Star Films	March 1, 2024	Fox Action Movies; Fox Family Movies
Middle East	Free channel, via Fox Media Network	Melody Movies Premiere HD (2013-2019) Fox Movies Premiere HD	March 1, 2019	—N/a	—N/a	Fox Action Movies; Fox Family Movies
Southeast Asia	channel, pay	Star Movies (Vietnam), Fox Movies Premium (the rest of Southeast Asia countries)	June 10, 2017	Star Movies Gold (Taiwan), Discontinued (HK and Southeast Asia)	October 1, 2021 (Hong Kong and the rest of Southeast Asia countries), January 1, 2022 (Taiwan)	Fox Action Movies; Fox Family Movies
Japan	channel, pay	Fox Movies	November 1, 2005	discontinued	January 31, 2021	—N/a
Portugal: Angola; Mozambique	channel, pay	—N/a	July 1, 2011	Star Movies	February 7, 2024	—N/a
Balkans: Albania; Bosnia and Herzegovina; Croatia; Macedonia; Montenegro; Serbia; Slovenia	channel, pay	—N/a	October 15, 2012	Star Movies	October 1, 2023	—N/a
