= Fox Rewayat =

- Broadcast area: Middle East and North Africa
- Headquarters: Abu Dhabi, U.A.E.

Programming
- Language: Arabic
- Picture format: 1080i (HDTV 16:9)

Ownership
- Owner: Fox Networks Group Middle East (Disney International Operations)
- Sister channels: Disney Channel; Disney Junior; Fox; Fox Life; Fox Crime; Fox Movies; Fox Action Movies; Fox Family Movies; Star Movies; Star World

History
- Launched: 28 September 2017; 8 years ago
- Closed: 1 December 2022; 3 years ago

Availability

Streaming media
- Shahid.net (MENA): Watch online

Fox Rewayat was a Middle Eastern pay television channel that was launched on 28 September 2017.

== History ==
On 28 September 2017, Fox Rewayat launched by Fox Networks Group along with Fox Crime and Fox Life in the Middle East market. On 4 November 2017, the channel started to broadcast exclusively in HD and became encrypted due to its move to satellite television provider beIN.

On 1 December 2022, the channel closed alongside FX, Fox Crime, and Fox Family Movies.
