= Television in the United Arab Emirates =

Television in the United Arab Emirates began in 1969.

== Overview ==
In 2011, the United Arab Emirates was the main headquarters to 72 free-to-air channels, falling slightly behind Saudi Arabia in terms of the total number of channels within the Arab world. The United Arab Emirates also had 16 terrestrial channels, of which 13 are state-owned.

Approximately 50% of viewers spend between one and three hours watching TV per day. Emirati nationals watch the highest amount of television, with 53% watching between three and six hours per day.

Zee TV remains at the top among expats due to the strong preponderance of South Asians in this group.

IPTV penetration was estimated at 33% in 2011. Although free-to-air television remains dominant, there has been an increase in the uptake of pay-TV, which is estimated at 45%.

== Former or discontinued channels ==
=== Former OSN Channels ===
==== 2011 ====
- Playhouse Disney was rebranded to Disney Junior on 11 July 2011.

==== 2013 ====
- ITV Granada rebranded to ITV Choice on 25 March 2013.
- Extreme Sports Channel ceased and broadcasting transmission on 1 May 2013.

==== 2014 ====
- MGM Channel HD rebranded to AMC HD on 1 December 2014.

===== 2016 =====
- BBC Entertainment ceased and broadcasting transmission on 1 January 2016. Replaced by BBC First.
- Cartoon Network HD, Boomerang HD, Turner Classic Movies and CNN HD ceased and broadcasting transmission on 15 February 2016 but relaunch back as Cartoon Network HD on 1 January 2024 and were replaced by Nick Jr. and Nickelodeon HD.

==== 2019 ====
- All Pehla Pack ceased broadcasting and transmission on 15 July 2019 due subscription to ala-carte.

==== 2021 ====
- Animal Planet HD was discontinued and terminated on 1 March 2021.

==== 2024 ====
- Disney Junior HD, Disney Channel HD, Star World HD, Star Movies HD, National Geographic HD, and Nat Geo Wild ceased broadcasting and transmission on 1 January 2024. Due to continues to Disney+ on Middle Eastern.

=== Former Bein Channels ===
==== 2022 ====
- FoxCrime HD, Fox Rewayat HD, Fox Family Movies HD ceased and broadcasting transmission on 30 November 2022.

==== 2024 ====
- Cartoon Network India HD ceased and broadcasting transmission on 1 January 2024.
- Fox Series HD, FoxLife HD, Fox Action Movies HD and Fox Movies HD was rebranded to Star Series HD, Star Life HD, Star Action HD and Star Films HD on 1 April 2024 due to strange rebrand along with Star World HD and Star Movies HD. Star Series HD, Star Life HD and Star Films HD ceased and broadcasting transmission on 1 November 2024.

== List of channels ==
- Dubai One
- Zee Aflam

== See also ==
- Radio and television channels of Dubai
- Dubai Media City
