= FX (Asia) =

Defunct Asian television channel

- Country: China (ceased transmission)
- Broadcast area: Asia (ceased transmission)
- Headquarters: Hong Kong SAR, China

Programming
- Language: English
- Picture format: 1080i HDTV

Ownership
- Owner: Fox Networks Group Asia Pacific (Disney International Operations)
- Sister channels: Star Chinese Movies; Fox Life; Fox Crime; Fox; Fox Sports; Channel V; National Geographic; Fox News Channel; Fox Movies; Fox Action Movies; Fox Family Movies; Disney Channel; Disney Junior; Disney XD

History
- Launched: November 3, 2008; 18 years ago June 16, 2010; 16 years ago (Malaysia); September 2012; 14 years ago (India); February 1, 2018; 8 years ago (Malaysia)
- Closed: July 2, 2020; 6 years ago (Brunei); October 1, 2020; 6 years ago (Indonesia); December 31, 2020; 5 years ago (South Korea); March 1, 2021; 5 years ago (Japan); September 1, 2021; 5 years ago (Now TV feed; Hong Kong); October 1, 2021; 5 years ago (Hong Kong and Asia)
- Replaced by: WakuWaku Japan (Cablelink channel space, Philippines); MX (South Korea)

FX was an Asian pay-television entertainment channel, owned and operated by Fox Networks Group Asia Pacific, a subsidiary of Disney International Operations. It was launched on November 3, 2008.

In India, the channel was replaced by an Indian localised feed in September 2012; however, some TV providers continue to distribute the Asian feed.

In South Korea, Tcast, the licensor for the Fox channels in the country, announced on December 31, 2020 that it had terminated its license agreement with The Walt Disney Company Korea renaming its channels. FX in that region would become MX.

FX along with most of The Walt Disney Company channels across Southeast Asia and Hong Kong (Fox Crime, Fox, Fox Life, Disney Junior, Disney Channel, Nat Geo People, Fox Movies, Fox Action Movies, Fox Family Movies, Star Movies China, SCM Legend, Channel [V], and five of its sports channels) ceased broadcasting on 1 September 2021 in Hong Kong and a month later in Southeast Asia. Most of these channels' shows moved to Disney+ (in Singapore, Philippines, Hong Kong and Taiwan) and Disney+ Hotstar (in Southeast Asia outside Singapore and Philippines).

== Programming ==
=== Final programming ===
- Black Monday
- Briarpatch
- Da Vinci's Demons
- Flatbush Misdemeanors
- Get Shorty
- The Good Lord Bird
- Interrogation
- Manhunt: Deadly Games
- Monsterland
- The New Pope
- Ray Donovan
- The Stand
- Twin Peaks

=== Former programming ===
- 1600 Penn
- 30 Rock
- According to Jim
- Alias
- American Horror Story
- Archer
- Awake
- BBQ Confessions
- Big Lake
- Bikini Destinations
- Boston Legal
- Bullet in the Face
- Californication
- Call Me Fitz
- Charlie Jade
- Crash
- Dirt
- Dirty Sexy Money
- Disorderly Conduct
- Episodes
- Eureka
- Family Guy
- Frasier
- Free Radio
- Friday Night Lights
- Ghost Hunters International
- Hangover Hangout
- Harper's Island
- In Plain Sight
- Injustice
- It's Always Sunny in Philadelphia
- JAG
- Last Comic Standing
- The Life & Times of Tim
- Lights Out
- Lilyhammer
- The Listener
- Louie
- Louis C.K.: Oh My God
- MacGyver
- Mad Men
- Magic City
- Mental
- My Generation
- My Name Is Earl
- Nurse Jackie
- Peep Show
- Playmakers
- Relic Hunter
- The Riches
- Running Wilde
- Saving Grace
- Scoundrels
- Scrubs
- Seinfeld
- Son of the Beach
- Sons of Anarchy
- Spartacus
- Spooks
- Terriers
- Testees
- Tilt
- Top Gear
- Trauma
- The Walking Dead
- Web Therapy
- World's Greatest Gambling Scams

== Feeds ==
- Southeast Asia (except Brunei, Indonesia, South Korea and Japan)
- Philippines
- High definition feed

== See also ==
- FX
- Fox Networks Group
- STAR TV
