= Fox Filipino =

Philippine television channel

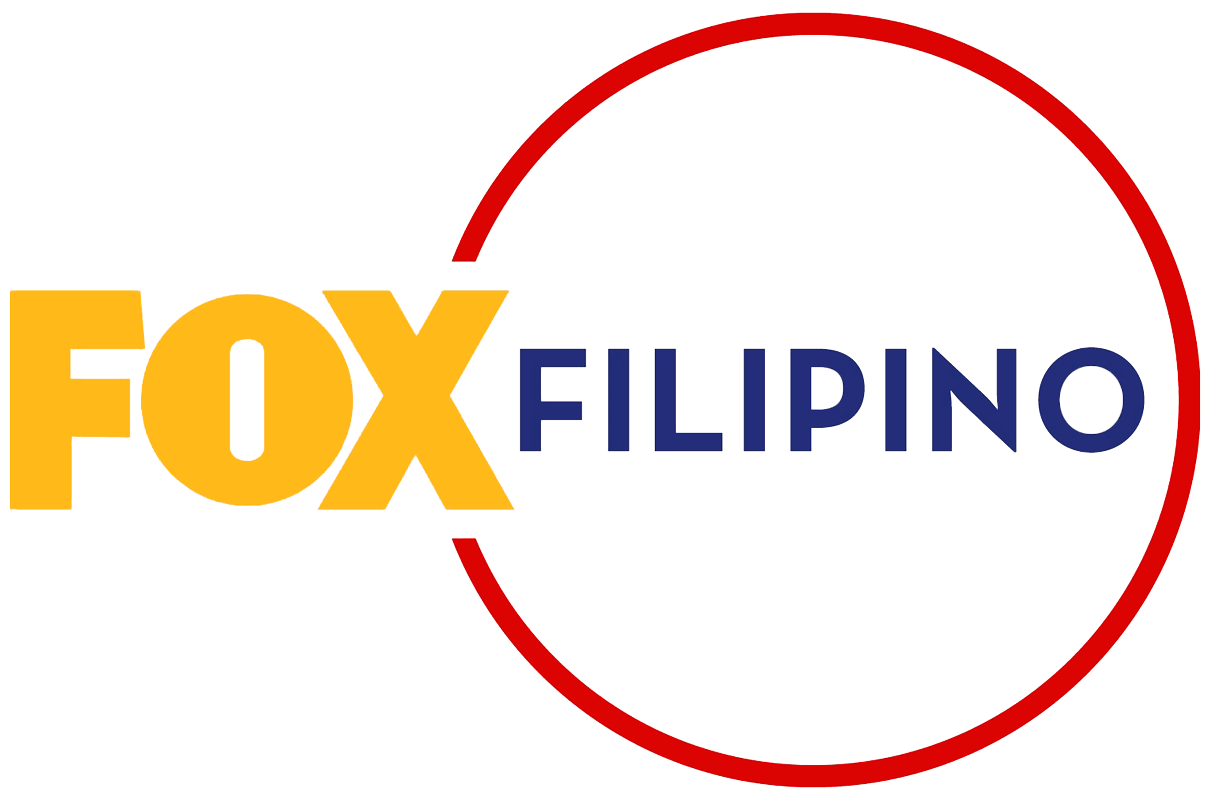
- Country: Philippines
- Network: GMA Network
- Headquarters: Pasig, Philippines

Programming
- Languages: Filipino; English
- Picture format: 480i (SDTV)

Ownership
- Owner: Fox Networks Group Asia Pacific (Walt Disney Direct-to-Consumer and International); Scenarios Inc. (a subsidiary of GMA Network Inc.)
- Sister channels: GMA; GMA News TV; Fox Family Movies; Fox Movies; Fox Life; tvN; Fox Sports; Channel V; National Geographic

History
- Launched: March 1, 2012
- Closed: July 7, 2020 (8 years, 4 months and 6 days)
- Replaced by: Heart of Asia Channel/Pinoy Hits (digital television); One Screen (satellite); Jeepney TV (Cignal channel space); Disney+ (OTT platform)

Fox Filipino was a Philippine pay television channel focused on Philippine-produced programming from GMA Network, TV5 and Sari-Sari Channel as well as Filipino movies from GMA Pictures, entries from the Cinemalaya Philippine Independent Film Festival, selected Asian and Hollywood movies, and selected foreign programming dubbed in Tagalog language.

After 8 years of broadcasting, Fox Networks Group announced that Fox Filipino would cease broadcast on July 7, 2020. The last program that aired on the channel was the drama series Destiny Rose before the color bars, as GMA and TV5 archived content were moved to its digital television channel, Heart of Asia Channel, Pinoy Hits (now defunct), and Cignal-run satellite network, One Screen (now defunct), respectively. Fox Filipino's channel space were later replaced by ABS-CBN/Creative Programs, Inc.-owned Jeepney TV on other cable and satellite platforms, including Cignal.

== See also ==
- Jeepney TV
- Pinoy Hits (defunct)
- Heart of Asia Channel
