= Fox Crime (Asia) =

Defunct Asian pay TV channel

- Country: Singapore
- Broadcast area: Hong Kong; Indonesia; Maldives; Myanmar; Philippines; Singapore; Thailand; Taiwan; Vietnam
- Headquarters: Hong Kong SAR, China

Programming
- Language: English
- Picture format: 1080i HDTV

Ownership
- Owner: Fox Networks Group Asia Pacific (Disney International Operations)
- Sister channels: Star Chinese Movies; Fox Life; FX; Fox; Fox Sports; Channel V; National Geographic; Fox Movies; Fox Action Movies; Fox Family Movies

History
- Launched: 2006; 20 years ago 1 March 2011; 15 years ago (Malaysia); 1 September 2012; 13 years ago (India)
- Closed: 2013; 13 years ago (Vietnam); July 2015; 10 years ago (India); 1 June 2018; 8 years ago (Malaysia); 1 October 2021; 4 years ago

Fox Crime was a Southeast Asian pay television channel, owned by Fox Networks Group Asia Pacific, a subsidiary of Disney International Operations. The channel focuses on crime and investigation series programs. In India, Fox Crime Asia was replaced with its Indian counterpart in September 2012. Fox Crime India was shut down in July 2015 due to low ratings.

FOX Crime, along with Channel [V] channels ceased transmission on Unifi TV on 1 June 2018.

Fox Crime (along with Fox, Fox Life, Channel [V], FX, Fox Movies, Fox Family Movies, Fox Action Movies, SCM Legend, Disney Channel, Disney Junior, Nat Geo People, Star Movies China, and five of its sports channels) ceased broadcasting across Southeast Asia and Hong Kong on October 1, 2021. Most of these channels' shows were shifted to Disney+ (in Singapore, Philippines, Hong Kong and Taiwan) and Disney+ Hotstar (in Southeast Asia outside Singapore and Philippines).

== Programming ==
=== Final programming ===
- 9/11 Rescue Cops
- CSI: NY
- Disappeared: The Search For Cody Dial
- Hard Time
- The Indestructibles
- Law & Order: Criminal Intent
- Monk
- Psych
- Situation Critical
- Tommy

=== Former programming ===
- 7 Deadly Sins
- Air Crash Investigation
- Alfred Hitchcock Presents
- American Crime
- Backstrom
- Body of Proof
- Border Security: America's Front Line
- Breakout
- Brotherhood
- Burn Notice
- Cold Squad
- Crime Town USA
- COPS
- CSI: Crime Scene Investigation
- CSI: Miami
- CSI: CYBER
- Chicago P.D.
- Dexter
- Dog Patrol
- Franklin & Bash
- FBI
- Gang Related
- Get Shorty
- The Glades
- Happily Never After
- Homicide Hunter
- I, Detective
- I Wouldn't Go in There
- The Kill Point
- Law & Order
- Life on Mars
- The Listener
- Locked Up Abroad
- Luther
- Leo Mattei, Special Unit
- The Making of the Mob
- The Man Who Made Us Fat
- The Man Who Made Us Spend
- The Man Who Made Us Thin
- Moonlighting
- Murder
- Movie Night
- Motorway Patrol
- My Strange Addiction
- Numbers
- The People v. O. J. Simpson: American Crime Story
- Perception
- Police Women
- Red Widow
- Stitchers
- Transformers Animated
- Twin Peaks
- Wicked City

== See also ==
- Fox Crime (Italy)
