= Star Action =

- Broadcast area: Middle East and North Africa
- Headquarters: Abu Dhabi, U.A.E.

Programming
- Languages: English; Arabic
- Picture format: 1080i (HDTV 16:9)

Ownership
- Owner: The Walt Disney Company EMEA (Disney Entertainment)
- Sister channels: List: Disney Channel; Disney Junior; Star Movies; Star World

History
- Launched: 18 April 2016; 10 years ago
- Former names: Fox Action Movies (2016–2024)

Availability

Streaming media
- Shahid.net (MENA): Watch online

Star Action (formerly known as Fox Action Movies) is a Middle Eastern pay television movie channel that centered towards broadcasting action-themed and horror-themed films that was launched in 2016.

== History ==
On 18 April 2016, Fox Action Movies was launched by Fox Networks Group along with Fox Family Movies and FX channels in the Middle East market.

On 1 October 2021, Fox Action Movies and 17 other Fox/Disney-owned channels across Southeast Asia ceased broadcasting. The last film to air was Big Freaking Rat. However, the Middle East and North Africa feed operated until 1 March 2024, when it was rebranded as Star Action, which adopted the name of one of multiplex Star Premium channels in Latin America that originally was used in 2021.

== See also ==
- Fox Action Movies
- Star Premium, where Star Action name originated
