= Star Sports (China) =

East Asian sports television channel

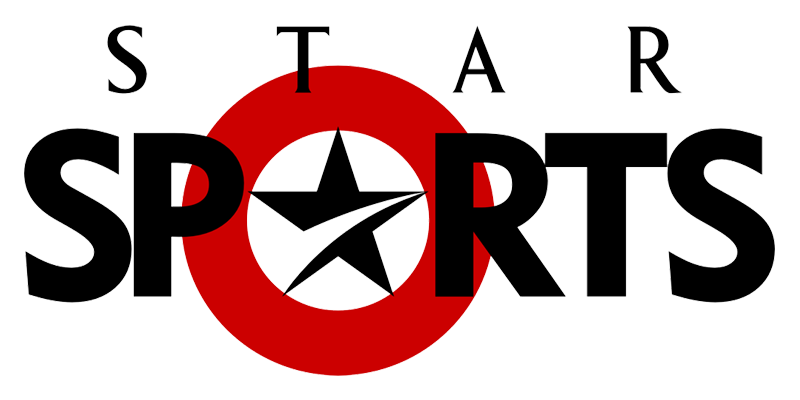
- Logo used since 2009.
- Country: China
- Headquarters: Hong Kong SAR, China

Programming
- Language: English
- Picture format: 1080i HDTV (downscaled to 16:9 480i/576i for the SDTV feed)

Ownership
- Owner: Disney International Operations
- Sister channels: Mainland China: Star Movies; National Geographic

History
- Launched: August 21, 1991; 35 years ago (Star Sports); June 1, 1992; 34 years ago (ESPN, Star Sports 2)
- Replaced by: SPOTV (South Korea)
- Former names: Star Sports 2: ESPN (1992–2014)

Links
- Website: global.espn.com

Star Sports is an East Asian pay television sports channel broadcast to Mainland China and formerly South Korea, operated by Fox Networks Group Asia Pacific, a subsidiary of The Walt Disney Company (Southeast Asia). It was previously part of the Fox Sports operations in East and Southeast Asia, but this version retained Star Sports name; ESPN Mainland China was instead renamed Star Sports 2.

== History ==
Hong Kong-based Star TV launched Prime Sports (later renamed Star Sports) in partnership with American company TCI, which owned Prime-branded regional sports channels. The channel was broadcast across Asia, as with the footprint of AsiaSat 1. Star TV has since regionalized the channel with several versions, including a dedicated version for Taiwan. Later, ESPN has joined in the region as a competitor to Star Sports.

In October 1996, ESPN and Star Sports agreed to combine their operations across Asia. As a result, a joint venture named, ESPN Star Sports was formed, to be headquartered in Singapore.

In April 1999, the channel had a first major logo change from vertical to horizontal, along with other STAR TV channels.

In June 2012, it was announced that News Corporation would buy ESPN International's share in ESPN Star Sports. Following the News Corporation take over, ESPN all over Asia would be relaunched as Fox Sports but the relaunch of ESPN Star Sports as Fox Sports did not affect much of East Asia, as Star Sports continued to broadcast in Mainland China and South Korea kept the brand, and instead, the version of ESPN for Mainland China was renamed as Star Sports 2 on 10 January 2014.

Unlike 16 other channels owned by Disney which were shut down in 2021 and 2023, Star Sports China continues to operate until this day.

== Channels ==
- Star Sports 1
- Star Sports 2: This channel was not available in South Korea only in Mainland China.

== Programming ==
Sporting events covered by Star Sports include:

=== Australian Rules Football ===
- Australian Football League

=== Baseball ===
- Major League Baseball:
  - Select spring training and regular season games (home games only and select road games)
  - ESPN Major League Baseball (Sunday Night Baseball and select special games, tie-breaker and Home Run Derby)
  - MLB All-Star Game (MLB International feed)
  - Postseason (wild card, Division Series and Championship Series)
  - World Series (MLB International feed)
- World Baseball Classic
- Korea Baseball Organization (ESPN feed)

=== Basketball ===
- US NCAA Men's College Basketball (Fox College Hoops)
- BIG3

=== Boxing ===
- Versus
- World Boxing Matches

=== Bull Riding ===
- Professional Bull Riders events

=== Cricket ===
- ICC
  - Cricket World Cup
  - Under-19 Cricket World Cup (all matches available on Fox+, highlights and live coverage of final on television)
  - Women's Cricket World Cup

=== Football ===
- AFC Champions League (from play-offs, for West Zone play-offs until quarter finals)
- AFC U-19 Championship
- AFC U-16 Championship
- AFC Futsal Championship
- AFC Futsal Club Championship
- Danish Super League (one match per week, 2019–2021 (originally from June 2020 with the remaining matches in 2019–20))
- DBU Pokalen (three matches (both semi finals and a final) in 2019–20)

=== Golf ===
- The Masters Tournament
- U.S. Open Championship
- The Open Championship
- PGA Championship
- PGA EuroPro Tour
- ANA Inspiration
- United States Women's Open Championship (golf)
- Women's PGA Championship
- Ricoh Women's British Open
- The Evian Championship
- Ladies European Tour (Highlights only)
- LPGA Tour

=== Kickboxing ===
- Kunlun Fight

=== Mixed Martial Arts ===
- Ultimate Fighting Championship

=== Motorsports ===
- Formula One
- FIA Formula 2 Championship
- FIA Formula 3 Championship
- FIM Motocross World Championship
- Superbike World Championship
- World Touring Car Cup (only for highlights)
- MotoGP
- WeatherTech SportsCar Championship
- European Endurance Championship (only for highlights)
- IndyCar Series
- Formula E
- Supercars Championship

=== Rugby ===
==== Union ====
- Global Rapid Rugby

=== Tennis ===
- Australian Open
- French Open
- Wimbledon
- US Open
- Fed Cup (final only)
- ATP Cup
- Laver Cup
- Hawaii Open

=== News ===
- SportsCenter
- ESPN FC

== See also ==
- Fox Sports (Asian TV network)
- Star Sports Network India
- Fox Sports' (and previously ESPN Star Sports') partnership in South Korea:
  - JTBC3 Fox Sports
  - SBS ESPN
  - MBC ESPN
