= Viajar =

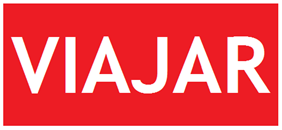
- Country: Spain
- Broadcast area: Spain
- Headquarters: Madrid, Spain

Programming
- Language: Spanish
- Picture format: 576i (16:9 SDTV); 1080i (HDTV)

Ownership
- Owner: Fox Networks Group (Walt Disney Direct-to-Consumer & International/Disney Spain and Portugal)

History
- Launched: 1 October 1997; 29 years ago (SD); 21 December 2010; 15 years ago (HD)
- Closed: 1 January 2022; 4 years ago

Links
- Website: Canal Viajar (archived October 2021)

Viajar was a television channel from Spain specializing in travel and tourism themes. It was broadcast via the Canal+ satellite platform and by cable providers. It was acquired by Fox in October 2011. Following its acquisition of 21th Century Fox by Disney in March 2019, the channel was closed on 1 January 2022 along with Fox Life, transferring the content moving to National Geographic.
