= Fox Life (African TV channel) =

FOX Life
- Country: Sub-Saharan Africa
- Network: Fox
- Headquarters: Oustarna, South Africa

Programming
- Language: English
- Picture format: 1080i HDTV (downscaled to 16:9 576i for the SDTV feed)
- Timeshift service: Fox Life SD +1

Ownership
- Owner: Fox Networks Group Africa (Disney International Operations)
- Parent: 21st Century Fox (News Corporation)
- Sister channels: Fox; National Geographic; Nat Geo Wild

History
- Launched: 3 October 2016; 10 years ago
- Closed: 30 September 2020; 6 years ago

Availability

Terrestrial
- DStv: Channel 214

Fox Life was an African pay television channel, launched in 2016 as the regional variant of the Fox Life brand. The channel was tailored for a female audience, with TV series, reality shows, talk shows and telenovelas.

== History ==
Fox Networks Group announced in September 2016 that it would replace Fox Crime with Fox Life from 3 October. The channel announced 954 hours of new content in an initial phase, which included US series Pitch and Atlanta. The channel launched with the English dub of the Portuguese telenovela Blood Ties. In September 2017, it announced the arrival of Turkish telenovelas, without even announcing a launch date. Reports had emerged that Heartbeat was going to be the first title seen, from 2 October, if the English dub was finished on time in order for the series to be sent to the channel. Shorter titles would be used first as a test, before beginning to air series with a longer length. In November 2017, it launched on Cell C's subscription streaming service Black.

On 7 March 2018, the channel introduced its first local production, Spirit, with psychic medium Cindy Kruger. This marked the start of a one-year plan to increase the amount of African content on the channel, beginning on 16 May with the interview-reality hybrid Game Changers, on 28 May, Chick Chat Live with the Nigerian presenter Cornelia O'Dwyer, on the same day, Dentaa Africa with Ghanaian actress Dentaa Amoateng, and on 9 July, Today's Leading Women, showcasing female entrepreneurs from Africa. At the 2018 upfront in August, the channel announced Outpatients, a documentary-reality series about aesthetic medicine by Dr. Cathy Davies in Johannesburg.

On 20 April 2020, the channel started a three-hour telenovela block for the afternoons. On 8 September 2020, The Walt Disney Company, who acquired the channel in the previous year, announced the closure of the channel, alongside Disney XD, as part of a plan to reduce its linear television operations.
