= Star Films =

- Broadcast area: Middle East and North Africa
- Headquarters: Abu Dhabi, United Arab Emirates

Programming
- Language(s): English; Arabic
- Picture format: 1080i (HDTV 16:9)

Ownership
- Owner: The Walt Disney Company EMEA (Disney Entertainment)
- Sister channels: Disney Channel; Disney Junior; Star Series; Star Life; Star Movies; Star Action; Star World

History
- Launched: 1 March 2024; 18 months ago
- Closed: 1 November 2024; 10 months ago
- Former names: Fox Movies (2008–2024)

Star Films (formerly known as Fox Movies) was a Middle Eastern pay television movie channel that was launched in 2008, as joint venture between News Corporation and Rotana Media Services.

== History ==
=== As Fox Movies ===
On 1 May 2008, Fox Movies was launched by Fox International Channels and Rotana Media Services along with Fox Series channels in the Middle East market. Fox then purchased a stake in Rotana, while the joint venture agreed with Disney to carry Disney and American Broadcasting Company content on the two channels for four years. In early March 2010, Fox International Channels agreed to move its Middle East and North Africa market channels' operations from Hong Kong and other locations to an Abu Dhabi facility.

=== As Star Films ===
On 1 March 2024, Fox Movies was rebranded as Star Films. It closed on November 1, 2024.
