= Fox Networks Group =

Television networks division of 21st Century Fox (1993–2019)

- International logo

- American logo
- Type: Subsidiary
- Industry: Television
- Founded: February 27, 1993; 33 years ago
- Founder: Rupert Murdoch
- Defunct: May 21, 2019; 7 years ago (US); March 11, 2024; 2 years ago (International)
- Fate: Assets split up and transferred to other Disney/Fox divisions and later dissolved on March 11, 2024 following Disney phasing out the Fox name
- Successors: Disney Entertainment Television Disney International Operations; Fox Entertainment; Fox Television Stations Fox News Media; Fox Sports Media Group
- Headquarters: Los Angeles, California, United States
- Area served: Worldwide
- Products: Pay television; Television channels
- Brands: BabyTV; Fox; Fox Sports (US/INTL); Fox Crime; Fox Life; Fox Comedy; Fox Movies; FX; National Geographic
- Parent: News Corporation (1993–2013); 21st Century Fox (2013–2019); Disney Entertainment Television (2019–2024, International)

Fox Networks Group (FNG) was the television networks division of News Corporation and later 21st Century Fox that operated from 1993 to 2019. It oversaw the production, broadcasting and distribution of the Fox, Fox Sports, FX, National Geographic and BabyTV brands in the United States and over 1.725 billion households globally. The division also operated video on demand services Fox Now, Fox Play and Fox Plus.

The domestic broadcast units of 21st Century Fox jointly operated Fox International Channels until 2016 when its units were absorbed into this division. FNG's domestic unit consisted of Fox Television Group (Fox and 20th Century Fox Television), Fox Cable Networks, Fox Sports Media Group, Fox News Group, National Geographic Partners and Fox Networks Digital Consumer Group. Following the completed acquisition of 21st Century Fox by the Walt Disney Company on March 20, 2019, the units making up the Fox Networks Group were dispersed into both the division's parent company's successor, Fox Corporation and Disney. Disney then revived the Walt Disney Television name previously used for their former television production company for their networks division at the time known as Disney–ABC Television Group to and retooled its international networks division previously known as Disney International Operations (later renamed Walt Disney Direct-to-Consumer & International, then Disney Media and Entertainment Distribution) to absorb the non-American units. Walt Disney Television changed name to Disney General Entertainment Content in 2021 and then to Disney Entertainment Television in 2023. DMED was dissolved in 2023 and the units of the latter got transferred to Disney's latest division, Disney Entertainment, with the channels being subsequently rebranded as either FX or the Star Channel while being taken over by Disney's international regional subsidiaries. The last Fox channel rebranding was in Spain on March 11, 2024.

== History ==
=== Formation and expansion ===
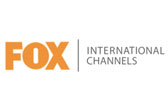
Fox International Channels logo used from 2007 to 2010

Fox International Channels logo used from 2010 to 2012

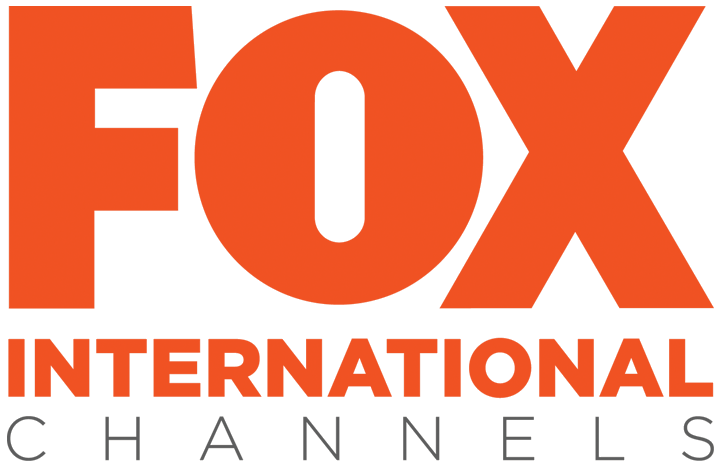
Fox International Channels logo used from 2014 to 2016

Australian-born American media magnate Rupert Murdoch purchased Hong Kong commercial broadcasting company Star TV in 1993 to launch Fox International Channels as the unit for the international expansion of the American Fox TV channel and subsequent multimedia businesses owned at the time by his company News Corporation. Murdoch later retooled and rebranded Star TV as Fox Networks Group Asia Pacific (later Disney Networks Group Asia Pacific). In 1997, Fox International Channels purchased NHNZ, a producer of documentaries, which had a stake in Singapore-based Beach House Pictures.

FIC entered the Spanish market with the launch of Fox in 2001, followed by National Geographic Channel, Fox Crime and Fox Life on.

In 2004, the FX289 channel for UK and Ireland was launched, later rebranded as FX as it moved to Sky EPG in 2005. The channel was rebranded as Fox on January 11, 2013.

In early 2006, FIC formed a production company called Fox Toma 1 with Argentine content producer Ernesto Sandler. FIC purchased a majority interest in Colombian television production company Telecolombia in June 2007 and renaming it Fox Telecolombia, to boost Spanish-language original shows for Latin America and the US, although Fox Telecolombia would still provide American channel Telefutura (now UniMás) and Colombian channel Canal RCN with programming. In September 2007, FIC purchased a majority share in the international operations of Israeli channel BabyTV with the founders retaining their original business.

Argentinian lifestyle channel Utilisima, launched in 1996, was sold to Fox International Channels in 2007, who launched an American feed of the channel in 2010 (later renamed Fox Life US). The channel went global in 2008, with the addition of a Portuguese feed (which later rebranded as the Portuguese Fox Life channel), and ended up being distributed across Latin America, Canada, Spain, New Zealand and Australia and the United States. The US version of the channel launched in May 2010. In 2013, it was rebranded as MundoFox and stopped being available internationally outside of Latin America (excluding Brazil). In July 2017, it was rebranded as Nat Geo Kids. Its Brazilian feed was launched separately on October of that same year.

National Geographic Channels International attempted to launch new sister channels in India, Nat Geo Wild, Nat Geo Adventure, Nat Geo Music and Nat Geo HD, by making them available to the market in 2008. Fox International Channels relaunched the Nat Geo channels again along with FX, Fox Crime and BabyTV to add to its existing Fox History (later renamed Fox Life India) and the main Nat Geo channel in June 2010.

In 2008, Fox International Channels purchased a controlling stake in Real Estate TV (RETV), a UK property-themed channel. In April 2008, FIC launched Fox Next in Portugal, on Meo's Meo Mix package. Fox Next targets audiences between the ages from 25 to 44 and is programmed with films and TV shows with thematic primetime and weekday blocks. In March 2008, FIC and Rotana Media Services launched Fox Movies and Fox Series channels in the Middle East market in order to cater to the Arab world and audience to feature American television shows in region. Fox then purchased a stake in Rotana in a joint venture agreed with Disney to carry its content and that of ABC for 4 years. With Abu Dhabi Media Company in 2009, FIC started National Geographic Abu Dhabi Channel. In mid-2008, Fox Broadcasting and 20th Century Fox Television formed Fox Inkubation, a joint initiative for new animation talent that would allow them to produce two minute shorts as pilots for new series. Fox TV had concurrently started its animation division 20th Century Fox Television Animation with Jennifer Howell, the same executive heading up both Inkubation and Fox TV Animation with Inkubation later being discontinued in 2012, as plans for a late night animation block moved forward and none of its projects got on the air with Howell exiting Fox at the end of her contract in 2013.

FIC launched the Fox Life channel in 2004 and in swathes of time periods in Italy, the Balkans, Bulgaria, Italy, Japan, Korea, Latin America, Poland, Portugal, Russia and Turkey. The channel was available in its originality in Greece with Greek dub on December 1, 2008.

An independent sales and marketing agency was set up in Tallinn, Estonia in 2009. In 2011, a Baltic regional office was set up in Tallinn with the independent marketing agency owner, Karoli Kindriks, as regional manager reporting to Ase Ytreland, Managing Director of Fox International Channels for Nordic & Baltic Region.

In 2009, News Corporation announced that it would reorganize their Asia-Pacific subsidiary Star TV in Hong Kong. Star TV was split into Star India and Star Greater China. A few of such arrangements were that the original Star TV company would take over representation of FIC's channels in the region from NGC Network Asia, LLC and Star itself would transform into a regional operation of Fox International Channels. Meanwhile, Star India would handle Fox-branded channels in India. The following year In 2010, Fox International Channels agreed to move its Middle East and North Africa market channels' operations from Hong Kong and other locations to an Abu Dhabi facility. Its NHNZ subsidiary would also open a production office in Abu Dhabi. Fox would also establish its Middle East operations, a global online ad network business,. In May 2010, FIC purchased a stake in Aquavision, a Johannesburg, South Africa production company, to be managed by NHNZ.

In June 2010, FIC and Jan Dekker Holdings formed a joint venture to operate 24Kitchen in the Dutch market. On September 1, 2011, Fox Channels Benelux launched 24Kitchen on UPC in the Netherlands, in partnership with Jan Dekker Holdings. It was later launched on other television channel/network providers on October 1, 2011.

In 2011, FIC Nordic launched Fox Crime in Norway. Finnish free-to-air TV channel, Suomi TV, was acquired by FIC on January 18, 2012. and then rebranded as Fox in April 2012, expanding the channel's air time to 12 hours while adding FIC's co-produced series The Walking Dead along with 20th Century Fox Television Distribution, National Geographic Channel and 24Kitchen content.

In 2011, Fox Movies was made available in Portugal on pay TV services and Angola and Mozambique on free-to-air TV. On October 27, 2011, FIC purchased Spanish travel television channel Viajar, from PRISA.

In January 2012, FIC and RCN Televisión announced that they would launch a new Spanish-language terrestrial television network named MundoFox in the United States as a joint venture. The network was formally launched on August 13 that year. Fox exited the joint venture in 2015, and the channel was renamed as MundoMax on July 28 that year, before it ceased operations on November 30, 2016.

In May 2012, Fox International Channels Latin America announced that it would acquire MGM's share in LAPTV, which operated The Film Zone, Cinecanal and Moviecity. In October 2013, FIC purchased Paramount's shares in LAPTV to become the sole owner. LAPTV's businesses were later folded into FIC Latin America and Moviecity was relaunched as Fox+ in November 2014.

Former Fox Networks Group president David Haslingden's Racat Group purchased New Zealand-based documentaries production company NHNZ and its sister company, Singapore-based Beach House Pictures, in 2012 from Fox. Portugal-based Fluid Youth Culture purchased Fuel TV by January 2013. On July 1, 2013, Fox Crime was replaced by Fox Network in Norway. FIC also renamed its premium Dutch network Eredivisie Live to Fox Sports Eredivisie, with its channels renamed as Fox Sports 1 to 3. In the third quarter of 2013, FIC's French-language channels, including National Geographic Channel, Nat Geo Wild and the travel-based Voyage, were expanded to Africa via RRsat's Global Network and Measat's Africasat-1a.

In 2013, Fox International Channels acquired the 3 Setanta Sports African channels; Zuku Sports (East Africa), Setanta Africa (English and French) and Setanta Action relaunched the latter two as Fox Sports and Fox Sports 2, respectively in August 2014 in time for the 2014–15 football league season.

In 2014, FIC took over the distribution of Star World, Star Movies, National Geographic-branded channels, Fox-branded channels, Channel V International, Baby TV and Sky News in the Middle East region from Star Select after its closure in the region.

Fox Television Group, encompassing of the Fox Broadcasting Company and 20th Century Fox Television, was formed in July 2014 and placed under Fox Networks Group. In June 2014, Fox Networks Group and Gail Berman formed The Jackal Group to provide programming for its various channels.

In July 2014, Fox Networks Group and DNA Films formed DNA TV Limited. Fox Networks Group would have global-first rights with co-financing options to the joint venture's shows. DNA TV would be managed by DNA Films management with Eric Schrier, president of original programming for FX Networks and FX Productions, handling Fox's interest.

In October 2014, Fox Crime Spain was replaced with FoxLife, with the latter's series programming moving primarily to Fox. FIC merged its Turkey pay-TV and free-to-air operations, were merged in late 2014. In the third quarter of 2014, a Fox-branded channel was launched in Sweden via Com Hem. FIC acquired Jan Dekker Holdings' stake of the 24Kitchen joint venture. FIC also closed the venture's production facility.

In late 2013, A&E Networks established an Italian branch and took full ownership of the Italian History channel from FIC Italy. In early 2014, the versions of Nat Geo Adventure in Asia and Pacific were relaunched as Nat Geo People. On October 1, 2015, Fox International Channels UK launched YourTV, which would target female viewers, on Freeview and YouView, with the channel later being shut down on September 27, 2019.

In 2015, 21st Century Fox and the National Geographic Society formed a new joint venture named National Geographic Partners that would oversee the Society's commercial ventures. This included the U.S. domestic and international versions of National Geographic-branded TV channels, but Fox Networks Group would continue to handle advertisement sales and distribution of these channels.

In January 2016, 21st Century Fox announced a major reorganization of its non-U.S. television businesses. Fox International Channels (FIC), which have been operating separately from 21CF's U.S. domestic television businesses, would be abolished and the head of its regional divisions would report to CEO Peter Rice and COO Randy Freer at Fox Networks Group in the United States, instead of outgoing FIC CEO Hernan Lopez, thus absorbing the international television businesses into Fox Networks Group. With that absorption, FIC's regional divisions being renamed Fox Networks Group Europe, Fox Networks Group Latin America and Fox Networks Group Asia, effectively abolishing Fox International Channels as a separate unit from 21st Century Fox's television business in the United States. All three international divisions of Fox Networks Group were collectively referred as Fox Networks Group International in 21CF's formal documents (including the group's annual reports).

In 2017, 21st Century Fox appointed Star India chairman and CEO Uday Shankar as president for the Asia-Pacific region of Fox Networks Group. The new role would oversee Fox's television and online video platform business across the region, and the president of Fox Networks Group Asia would report directly to Shankar (instead of the equivalent at FNG U.S.). This did not affect 20th Century Fox's filming business in the region, whose heads would continue to reported to the Charman and CEO of the film company.

=== Disney acquisition and closure ===
In 2017, The Walt Disney Company formally announced its intention to acquire most of 21st Century Fox assets. Businesses to be bought by Disney included FX Networks, a share in National Geographic Partners and international operations of Fox Networks Group. The Murdoch family would retain the ownership of Fox Broadcasting Company, Fox Television Stations, the American Fox Sports units, Fox News Channel and Fox Business Network, through a new company, eventually named Fox Corporation. Disney also acquired the regional Fox Sports Networks, but the U.S. Department of Justice ordered that those assets be sold within 90 days of closing of the deal due to Disney's majority ownership of ESPN.

In 2018, European Commission officials conducted an unannounced search of Fox Networks Group's West London offices, as part of an antitrust inquiry surrounding broadcast rights to sporting events.

In 2019, Fox Corporation was officially spun off from 21st Century Fox and began trading on the Nasdaq. The next day, March 20, The Walt Disney Company completed the acquisition of 21st Century Fox. This rendered Fox Networks Group as a standalone unit abolished. Disney then retooled its local television networks unit at the time. Disney, FX Networks and U.S. operations of National Geographic television channels were placed under the second incarnation of Walt Disney Television (now Disney Entertainment Television), 20th Century Fox Television and Fox 21 Television Studios became a part of Disney Television Studios, and Fox Networks Group CEO Peter Rice was appointed as the Chairman of Walt Disney Television. The international businesses of Fox Networks Group would be integrated with Walt Disney Direct-to-Consumer and International (later renamed Disney Media and Entertainment Distribution).

In 2020, Disney dropped the "Fox" name from the 20th Century Studios and Searchlight Pictures film units, though no mention was made about the changes to Fox Networks Group or other Disney-owned Fox-branded units. In the following years, Disney begun closing various channels from the Fox Networks Group due to dwindling ratings and to refocus its resources for Disney+ with the remaining active international Fox channels being rebranded as Star Channel (based upon the Star hub available on Disney+ in Japan only) or as FX Channels (with the exception of Japan and Turkey where the channels were respectively renamed as a revival of Dlife and Now respectively), effectively closing Fox Networks Group.

== Units ==
=== United States ===
==== Fox Television Group ====
- Fox Broadcasting Company – transferred to Fox Corporation
- 20th Century Fox Television – transferred to the second incarnation of Walt Disney Television (now Disney Entertainment Television)
  - Fox 21 Television Studios – transferred to Disney Television Studios
  - Fox Television Animation – transferred to Disney Television Studios
  - The original 20th Television – transferred to Disney Television Studios
    - Lincolnwood Drive, Inc.

==== Fox Cable Networks ====
===== National Geographic Partners =====
Transferred to Disney General Entertainment Content (now Disney Entertainment Television)

A partnership with National Geographic Society in which Fox owned 73%

- National Geographic Global Networks
  - National Geographic
  - Nat Geo Kids
  - Nat Geo Music
  - Nat Geo People
  - Nat Geo Wild
  - National Geographic Studios
- National Geographic Media, print, digital publishing, travel and tour operations

===== FX Networks =====
Transferred to Disney General Entertainment Content (now Disney Entertainment Television)

- FX
- FXX
- FX Movie Channel
- FX Productions
- FX Entertainment
  - DNA TV Limited – Joint venture with DNA Films, run by DNA Films' management

===== Fox Sports Media Group =====
- Fox Sports – transferred to Fox Corporation, along with other nationwide cable channels and the Big Ten Network
  - Fox Sports 1
  - Fox Sports 2
  - Fox Deportes
  - Fox Soccer Plus
  - Big Ten Network (51% owned in joint venture with Big Ten Conference)
- Fox Sports Networks – sold to Diamond Sports Group, a joint venture between Sinclair Broadcasting Group and Allen Media Group
  - Arizona
  - Detroit
  - Florida/Sun
  - Midwest (subfeeds: Indiana, Kansas City)
  - North
  - Ohio/SportsTime Ohio
  - South / Fox Sports Southeast (subfeeds: Carolinas, Tennessee)
  - Southwest (subfeeds: Oklahoma, New Orleans)
  - West/Prime Ticket (subfeed: San Diego)
  - Wisconsin
  - YES Network (80% equity)
- Fox College Sports – sold to Diamond Sports Group, a joint venture between Sinclair and Allen Media Group
- Home Team Sports (HTS) advertising sales for sports channels including other regional sports networks plus commercial and program production, events, and local live custom brand integration – sold to Playfly Sports
  - Fox Sports College Properties – college rights holder for Big East Conference, several colleges: Michigan State, Auburn, San Diego State, Georgetown and USC and the Los Angeles Memorial Coliseum– sold to Playfly Sports
  - Impression Sports & Entertainment – naming rights and event sponsorships– sold to Playfly Sports

==== Fox Television Stations Group ====
Transferred to Fox Corporation

- Fox Television Stations
  - 28 stations
  - MyNetworkTV
  - Movies! (50%)

==== Fox News Group ====
Transferred to Fox Corporation

- Fox News Channel
- Fox Business
- Fox News Radio
- Fox News Talk
- Fox Nation

=== International ===
Country Subsidiary	Fox	Fox Crime	Fox Comedy	Fox Life	Fox Sports	Fox Movies	National Geographic	Nat Geo Wild	Nat Geo People	BabyTV	Other
Fox Networks Group (UK) Limited	Yes	No	No	No	No	No	Yes	Yes	No	Yes	FX; YourTV
Fox Networks Group Italy SARL	Yes	Yes	Yes	Yes	Yes	No	Yes	Yes	No	Yes	FX; Fox Animation
Fox Networks Group Bulgaria EOOD	Yes	Yes	No	Yes	No	No	No	Yes	No	Yes	24Kitchen
Fox Networks Group Serbia	Albania; Croatia; Macedonia; Serbia; Slovenia	Croatia; Serbia; Slovenia	No	Croatia; Macedonia; Serbia; Slovenia	No	Croatia; Macedonia; Serbia; Slovenia	Croatia; Macedonia; Serbia; Slovenia	Albania; Croatia; Serbia; Slovenia	No	Yes	24Kitchen
Fox Networks Group Hungary	Yes	No	No	No	No	No	Yes	Yes	Romania	Yes	
Fox Networks Group France SA	No	No	No	Yes	No	No	Yes	Yes	No	Yes	Voyage
Fox Networks Group Greece	Yes	No	No	Yes	Yes	No	Yes	Yes	No	Yes	FX
Fox Networks Group Russia	Estonia; Latvia; Lithuania; Belarus; Russia	No	No	Estonia; Latvia; Lithuania; Belarus; Russia	No	No	Estonia; Latvia; Lithuania; Belarus; Russia	Estonia; Latvia; Lithuania; Belarus; Russia	No	Yes	
Fox Networks Group Polska Sp. z o.o.	Yes	No	Yes	No	No	No	Yes	Yes	Yes	Yes	
Fox Networks Group (Finland) Oy	Yes	No	No	No	No	No	Yes	Yes	No	Yes	
Fox Networks Group Scandinavia	Sweden; Norway	No	No	No	No	No	Yes	Yes	No	Yes	Xee
Fox Networks Group España, S.L.U.	Yes	No	No	Yes	No	No	Yes	Yes	No	Yes	Viajar
Fox Networks Group Portugal SA	Yes	Yes	Yes	Yes	No	Yes	Yes	Yes	No	Yes	24Kitchen; FX; Mundo Fox
Fox Networks Group Turkey	Yes	Yes	Yes	Yes	Yes	No	Yes	Yes	No	Yes	24Kitchen; FX
Fox Networks Group Germany GMBH	Yes	No	No	No	No	No	Yes	Yes	No	Yes	
Fox Networks Group Benelux BV	Yes	No	No	No	Yes	No	Yes	Yes	No	Yes	24Kitchen
Fox Networks Group Africa	Yes	Yes	No	Yes	Yes	No	Yes	Yes	No	Yes	FX; Nat Geo Gold
Fox Networks Group Middle East FZ LLC	Yes	Yes	No	Yes	No	Yes	Yes	Yes	No	Yes	FX; Fox Rewayat; Fox Family Movies; Fox Action Movies; Channel V; Star Movies; Star World
Fox Networks Group Latin America	Yes	No	No	Yes	Yes	No	Yes	Yes	No	Yes	Cinecanal; Moviecity; Film Zone; FX; FXM; Nat Geo/Fox HD; Nat Geo Kids; Fox Premium
Fox Networks Group Asia Pacific	Yes	Yes	No	Yes	Yes	Yes	Yes	Yes	No	Yes	FX; Fox Filipino; Fox Family Movies; Fox Action Movies; Channel V; Star Movies; Star World; Star Chinese Channel; Star Chinese Movies; Star Chinese Movies Legend; Star Entertainment Channel; Star Movies Gold and Star Movies HD Taiwan
Fox Networks Group Japan	Yes	Yes	No	Yes	Yes	Yes	Yes	Yes	No	Yes	Fox Classics; Nat Geo Music

== Divisions ==
=== Fox Networks Digital Consumer Group ===
Fox Networks Digital Consumer Group (FNDCG) was a division of 21st Century Fox. Following Disney's acquisition of 21CF, FX Now and Nat Geo TV transferred to the second incarnation of Walt Disney Television (now Disney Entertainment Television) while Fox Now was transferred to Fox Corporation and Fox Sports Go (now FanDuel Sports Network app) was sold to Diamond Sports Group (now Main Street Sports Group), a former joint venture between Sinclair Broadcast Group and Allen Media Group.

Unit	Transferred to
FXNOW	Disney General Entertainment Content (now Disney Entertainment Television)
Nat Geo TV	Disney General Entertainment Content (now Disney Entertainment Television)
Fox Now	Fox Corporation
Fox Sports Go (now FanDuel Sports Network app)	Sold to Diamond Sports Group (now Main Street Sports Group), a joint venture between Sinclair Broadcast Group and Allen Media Group

=== Fox Networks Group Content Distribution ===
Fox Networks Group Content Distribution was a global distributor of high-quality scripted and unscripted programming and formats. It was a division of Fox Networks Group.

=== Fox Networks Engineering & Operations ===
Fox Networks Engineering & Operations (Fox NE&O) was the technical operations arm of the Fox Networks Group. It managed the network operations infrastructure and origination of the FNG outlets, including facilities such as the Fox Network Centers on the Fox Studio Lot in Los Angeles, the Woodlands, and Charlotte. A unit of Fox Digital Enterprises, Inc. (now TFCF Digital Enterprises, Inc. under Disney), the division originally started out as MetroTape West under Metromedia, but became Fox Tape as Fox took over the Metromedia Square lot, then became Fox Digital as Fox moved operations to the digital Fox Network Center on the Century City lot of 20th Century Fox. On April 20, 2004, FNG announced the launch of Fox Networks Engineering & Operations. In addition to providing master control resources, Fox NE&O also worked with Fox Sports on technologies implemented in their coverage, such as the Ventuz-based FoxBox and broadcast studios.

=== Fox Global Networks ===
Fox Global Networks was a division of Fox Networks Group that was responsible for the distribution and marketing of Fox Networks Group USA.

=== Fox Media ===
Fox Media was a division of Fox Networks Group that enables innovative ad sales partnerships, including native advertising and branded content, across multiple platforms.

=== Fox Hispanic Media ===
Fox Hispanic Media was the advertisement sales arm of Fox's portfolio of Spanish-language brands.

== See also ==
- Foxtel
- Fox Broadcasting Company
- Disney General Entertainment Content
