= BBC TV Europe =

- Country: United Kingdom (for external consumption only)
- Broadcast area: Europe (except the United Kingdom)
- Headquarters: BBC TV Europe News Centre, BBC Television Centre, London, United Kingdom

Programming
- Language: English

Ownership
- Owner: BBC

History
- Launched: 4 June 1987; 39 years ago as BBC 1/2 Mix in Scandinavia; 1 April 1989; 37 years ago as BBC TV Europe for the whole of Europe
- Closed: 11 March 1991; 35 years ago (Europe)
- Replaced by: BBC World Service Television Europe (11 March 1991 – 16 January 1995)

BBC TV Europe was a BBC subscription-funded television service established in 1987, serving continental Europe, initially Scandinavia. It was available on satellite and cable.

The channel was branded as BBC 1/2 Mix when it launched on 4 June 1987, but was rebranded BBC TV Europe on 1 April 1989.

Initially, two regional telecommunications companies in Denmark, KTAS (Københavns Telefon A/S) and JTAS (Jydsk Telefon A/S) contacted the BBC with a view to retransmit both BBC1 and 2 on their cable networks in Denmark, offering the BBC payment to cover the costs of the satellite slots. The BBC's commercial division, BBC Enterprises, looked into the proposal but found it would be impossible to secure rights for this. This led the BBC to instead create a separate new channel for Denmark, known as BBC 1/2 Mix. This later expanded to Norway in late 1987 and Sweden in early 1988.

The channel broadcast a mix of the programmes shown on BBC1 and BBC2 in the United Kingdom, as well as the BBC's domestic BBC Six O'Clock News bulletin, together with the regional news service from London. BBC1 programming took priority: when a programme on BBC1 could not be shown on the channel for rights reasons, it was replaced with a programme shown on BBC2.

The channel made its formal launch in Portugal at the facilities of the British Council in Lisbon on 20 April 1989. The channel's schedule averaged seventeen hours a day, from 7am to midnight. Piracy was a recurring issue, as such the BBC had to hire sales agents by country for the sale of authorised BBC TV Europe decoders and subscriptions.

The channel was managed and operated by the BBC, but jointly marketed by the two Danish telecommunications companies. However, they were not able to make a profit from the channel, and sold their interest in it to the BBC, which renamed it BBC TV Europe and took full control of its operations and commercialisation, making it available to the whole of Western and Northern Europe (excluding the UK), and also making it officially available for individual viewers who wished to receive it directly via satellite by means of subscription. In 1990, a second service for non-UK viewers entitled "Enterprise Channel" was launched to complement the main BBC TV Europe service, but by the end of that year it had been folded back into the existing network.

The channel also carried the English team's matches in the 1990 FIFA World Cup.

On 11 March 1991 the channel was replaced by BBC World Service Television.
