= YourTV =

- Country: United Kingdom; Ireland

Programming
- Picture format: 576i 16:9 SDTV
- Timeshift service: YourTV +1 (shut down around 2016-17)

Ownership
- Owner: Fox Networks Group (Walt Disney Direct-to-Consumer and International)
- Sister channels: Fox; BabyTV; National Geographic; Nat Geo Wild

History
- Launched: 1 October 2015; 11 years ago
- Closed: 27 September 2019; 7 years ago

Availability (at time of closure)

Terrestrial
- Freeview: Channel 72

YourTV was a British television channel owned by Fox Networks Group, a unit of Walt Disney Direct-to-Consumer and International. It began broadcasting on 1 October 2015 in the United Kingdom and Ireland.

== History ==
On 3 September 2015, Fox International Channels announced they were going to launch a new, free-to-air channel in the UK. YourTV promised "sensational real-life stories, irresistible experiences and thrilling tales".

The channel launched on 1 October 2015 on Freeview, YouView, Freesat and Sky. It launched on Virgin Media on channel 218 on 21 July 2018. YourTV +1 was also launched on 1 October 2015 on Freeview channel 78 but only broadcast for a couple of hours. It moved to 73 a while later before being removed. YourTV continued its programming as a regular channel. However, in 2019, Disney decided to consolidate YourTV's programming into the main Fox channel's schedule, with the channel closing down at 12pm on 27 September 2019 with its Sky slot being taken by Sky Two.

== Final programming ==
The last shows to be shown on YourTV were Sea Patrol and Body of Proof (with the first episode of Body of Proof season two being the very last programme scheduled between 11am – 12pm)

- Baking Good, Baking Bad
- Behind Mansion Walls
- Body of Proof
- Bones
- Castle
- Corrupt Crimes
- Cruise Ship Diaries
- Derek Acorah's Ghost Towns
- Don't Tell the Bride
- Law & Order
- Murder She Solved
- Murderous Affairs
- On the Case
- Past Hunters
- Rescue: Special Ops
- Sea Patrol
- Shark
- Killer Couples
- The Mentalist
- The Real NCIS
- The Republic of Doyle
- Valentine Warner's Wild Table

== See also ==
- ABC1 (UK and Irish TV channel) – another former Freeview channel (also closed by Disney)
