= Star Chinese Channel =

Taiwanese Mandarin general entertainment television channel

- Country: Greater China (21 October 1991–30 March 1996); Republic of China (Taiwan) (30 March 1996–1 January 2024)
- Broadcast area: Taiwan (21 October 1991–1 January 2024)
- Headquarters: British Hong Kong (1991–30 March 1996); Taipei, Taiwan (30 March 1996–1 January 2024)

Programming
- Languages: Cantonese (21 October 1991–30 March 1996); Mandarin (21 October 1991–1 January 2024)
- Picture format: 1080i HDTV

Ownership
- Owner: The Walt Disney Company (Taiwan) Ltd.
- Sister channels: Star Chinese Movies; Star World; Star Movies Gold & Star Movies HD

History
- Launched: 21 October 1991
- Closed: 31 March 1996; 30 years ago (Southeast Asia, Hong Kong, Macau and Mainland China); 2 July 2020 (SD, Brunei); 19 September 2021 (Transvision in Indonesia feed); 1 October 2021 (Unifi TV in Malaysia feed and Singtel TV in Singapore feed); 31 January 2022 (Astro in Malaysia feed); 30 September 2023 (Hong Kong); 1 January 2024; 2 years ago (Taiwan)
- Replaced by: Phoenix Chinese Channel (Southeast Asia, Hong Kong, Macau and Mainland China); KMTV (Taiwan)
- Former names: Star TV Chinese Channel (21 October 1991-31 December 2000)

Links
- Website: www.dngtw.tw/scc/ (Taiwan)

Star Chinese Channel (Chinese: 衛視中文台) was a Taiwanese general entertainment television channel operated by The Walt Disney Company (Taiwan) Ltd. Its programming featured dramas, variety shows, lifestyle programs, and talk shows in Mandarin.

Launched on 21 October 1991 at 16:30 Hong Kong Time by its predecessor, Star TV, the channel initially targeted audiences in Greater China, broadcasting in both Mandarin and Cantonese. However, on 30 March 1996, it reduced its broadcasting area to Taiwan and switched to Mandarin-only programming.

Star Chinese Channel, along with its sister channel, Star Entertainment Channel, ceased operations on 1 January 2024, as Disney further expanded its Disney+ streaming platform.

== History ==
The fourth of the five original channels of Star TV, Star Chinese Channel was launched on 21 October 1991 at 16:30 Hong Kong Time as STAR TV Chinese Channel. Initially, it targeted audiences across Greater China, broadcasting in both Mandarin and Cantonese.

Star Chinese Channel was introduced as a 24-hour Mandarin-language variety entertainment channel, featuring full Chinese-language content primarily provided by ATV in Hong Kong and broadcasting from Mainland China. It also aired television series from other regions in Greater China, including China, Hong Kong, Macau, Taiwan, and Singapore. Additionally, it was the first commercially owned television channel to broadcast in Taiwan.

Originally a free-to-air channel, Star TV later encrypted its signal. Until 30 March 1996 at 19:00 Hong Kong Time, the channel was broadcast across Greater China. On that date, Star TV regionalized STAR TV Chinese Channel, reducing its broadcast area to Taiwan only. Viewers outside Taiwan were instead provided access to Phoenix Chinese Channel.

At one point, the channel's operations were relocated from British Hong Kong to Taipei on 30 June 1997.

Shiau Hong-chi stated that Star TV's original business strategy was to broadcast popular American shows to Taiwanese audiences with minimal effort. However, he argued that this plan was unsuccessful, forcing Star TV to invest in localized branches such as Star Chinese Channel and Channel V Taiwan, as well as produce local programming.

As Disney, which had previously acquired FOX International Networks, decided to further expand Disney+ across Asian markets, it made the decision to shut down its entire cable TV network, including Star Chinese Channel.

The channel had already ceased operations in Southeast Asia, Hong Kong, and Macau on 1 October 2023, while Taiwan was the final market to see its closure. Star Chinese Channel, along with its sister channel Star Entertainment Channel, officially shut down in Taiwan on 1 January 2024. Following its closure, the channel in Taiwan was later replaced by KMTV.

== Feeds ==
| Country/Region | Date |
|---|---|
| Taiwan | Star Chinese Channel (Chinese: 衛視中文台): 21 October 1991 – 1 January 2024; Star Entertainment Channel (Chinese: 星衛娛樂台): (An alternative channel launched in 2012, available in certain cable TV providers and on CHT MOD in Taiwan): 2012–1 January 2024 |
| China | Star Chinese Channel (Chinese: 衛視中文台): 21 October 1991 – 31 March 1996; Phoenix Chinese Channel (Chinese: 凤凰卫视中文台): 31 March 1996–January 1, 2024 |
| International Feed: Southeast Asia: Hong Kong Macau Myanmar Maldives Thailand Cambodia Laos Vietnam Philippines Indonesia Singapore Malaysia Timor-Leste Papua New Guinea Brunei; NON Southeast Asia Countries: Australia New Zealand Saudi Arabia United Arab Emirates South Africa United Kingdom United States Canada | Hong Kong, Macau and Southeast Asia: Star Chinese Channel (Chinese: 衛視中文台): 21 October 1991 – 31 March 1996 and 2 October 2006 – 30 September 2023; Phoenix Chinese Channel (Chinese: 鳳凰衛視中文台): 31 March 1996–Today; Australia, New Zealand: 2 October 2006 – 2018 USA and Canada: 2 October 2006 – 2018 Middle East, South Africa and UK: 2 October 2006 – 30 September 2023 |
