= Randy Freer =

- Born: 1959 or 1960 (age 66–67)
- Education: Saint Joseph's College of Maine
- Occupation: Television executive
- Title: Former CEO, Hulu
- Term: 2017–2020

Randy Freer (born 1959/1960) is an American television executive, and the former chief executive officer (CEO) of Hulu.

== Early life ==
Freer attended Saint Joseph's College of Maine in Standish, Maine and graduated with degrees in business and history in 1982.

== Career ==
Freer joined FSN in 1997 after serving for three years as senior vice president, business affairs at Active Entertainment, an animation syndication firm. Prior to that, Freer spent nine years at Turner Broadcasting, the last two as executive vice president, entertainment sales. In that position, Freer was responsible for overseeing all advertising sales for Turner Broadcasting System (TBS) and Turner Network Television (TNT), as well as the Cartoon Network.

Previously in his career at Fox, Freer served as co-president and COO, FOX Sports Media Group, where he focused on growing and enhancing Fox Sports' portfolio of league, conference, and team media rights. In recent years, he oversaw the negotiations that led to new long-term agreements with the National Football League, Major League Baseball, NASCAR, and the USGA, as well as with the Pac-12, Big 12, and Big East Conferences. Freer also played a significant role in Fox's acquisitions of the World Cup and the Ultimate Fighting Championship (UFC). Freer's efforts to bolster FOX Sports’ complement of media rights helped lay the foundation for FOX Sports 1, the company's new national sports television network, which launched in August 2013.

Prior to joining Hulu, Freer was president and CEO of Fox Networks Group, a position to which he was named in October 2013. In this role, Freer directly oversaw revenue, distribution, and operations for Fox Networks Group, including FOX Broadcasting Company, FOX Sports, FX Networks, Fox International Channels, and National Geographic Channels. He was also responsible for rights acquisitions, and team and league relationships on behalf of FOX Sports. Freer reported to Peter Rice, chairman and CEO, Fox Networks Group.

Freer was the CEO of Hulu from October 2017 to January 2020 and reported to Kevin Mayer, chairman of Walt Disney Direct-to-Consumer & International. Freer stepped down from his position as CEO after corporate restructuring intended to further integrate Hulu into Disney's direct-to-consumer & international division. Hulu's executives will now report directly to Mayer.

== Recognition ==
Both Business Week and Sports Business Journal have named Freer one of the most influential people in the business of sports on multiple occasions. CableFax Magazine has also named Freer the number-one most powerful executive in local sports television for three consecutive years (2008–2010).

In December 2013, Sports Business Daily named Freer and Eric Shanks the number one most influential people in sports business. "Under the direction of Freer and Shanks, Fox Sports dictated, shaped and in some cases inflated the sports media marketplace in recent years, gobbling up rights in a buildup to the August launches of Fox Sports 1 and Fox Sports 2."

In April 2019, Freer was named one of Business Insider's 100 People Transforming Business.
