= BBC World Service Television =

Former BBC international satellite television channels

BBC World Service Television BBC WSTV (Asia)
- Country: UK
- Broadcast area: Worldwide
- Network: BBC
- Headquarters: BBC Television Centre

Programming
- Picture format: 576i (4:3 SDTV)

Ownership
- Owner: BBC

History
- Launched: 11 March 1991; 35 years ago
- Replaced: BBC TV Europe
- Closed: 26 January 1995; 31 years ago
- Replaced by: BBC World; BBC Prime

BBC World Service Television, often abbreviated to WSTV (World Service Television), was the name of two BBC international satellite television channels between 1991 and 1995. It was the BBC's first foray into worldwide television broadcasting. In Europe, it was the successor to BBC TV Europe, which it replaced on 11 March 1991. The service was also launched in Asia as a 24-hour news and information service with minor differences, a precursor to BBC World News, launched on 14 October 1991.

Unlike the BBC World Service at the time, it was not funded by the British government through a grant-in-aid. Instead, it was funded either by subscription or by commercial advertising, with advertisements inserted locally by individual cable or satellite providers. News headlines, trailers and other updates, known as "break fillers", were inserted to fill gaps in cases where no commercials were broadcast by the local provider.

== Availability ==
=== Europe ===
In Europe, BBC WSTV replaced BBC TV Europe on 11 March 1991 as the BBC's subscription-funded entertainment service. Like BBC TV Europe, it was a mix of BBC1 and BBC2. However, in place of BBC TV Europe's near-continuous direct rebroadcast of BBC1 and schedule pattern timed to UK time (GMT/BST), it had a schedule pattern more synchronised to Central European Time and many of its first-run programmes were timeshifted to more suitable times for viewing in CET, as well as showing specially commissioned World Service News bulletins from Television Centre. The BBC World Service News studio looked like the BBC's domestic news, though with different graphics and an on-screen logo. The station also broadcast its own Children's BBC junctions from Presentation Studio A.

=== Outside Europe ===
Outside Europe, BBC World Service Television was the name of the 24-hour news, information and current affairs service, launched in Asia on 14 October 1991 as carried by Star TV, and also available from Turkey to South Korea on AsiaSat. Competing against CNN International, it showed current affairs and documentary programming from BBC One and BBC Two in addition to BBC World Service News with entertainment programs aired on Star Plus. Explaining why the company choose to carry BBC WSTV instead of CNN, Richard Li, who was head of Star TV at the time, cited American bias projected in CNN's coverage of the Gulf War, in an interview with The New York Times.

News Corporation, of Rupert Murdoch, began acquiring Star TV in 1993. In March 1994, the BBC and Star TV reached a deal after an out of court settlement, that would gradually drop BBC World Service Television from the satellite broadcaster's offerings. BBC WSTV would be dropped from the channel line-up for the Northeast Asia by mid-April that year, but would be available in the rest of Asia until 31 March 1996.

BBC World Service Television programming was also carried in Africa on M-Net, launched on 15 April 1992, for 11 hours a day. In Canada, its bulletins were carried on CBC Newsworld several times a day.

BBC World Service Television news broadcasts were aired on Malaysia's TV1 until May 1994, with the BBC demanding that it would stop supply their content to Malaysia and should air their content without cuts, which TV1's operator RTM thought was unfair. It also said that the BBC ignored priorities and cultural values of Asians.

== Presentation ==
The channel from 1991 until c.1994 used the presentation device of a rotating world: the Computer Originated World, which had previously been used on BBC One between 1985 and 1991. The world symbol remained the same, but the legend at the bottom was altered to a BBC logo with an italic "World Service" beneath. Promotional style and static programme captions mirrored that of BBC1 and 2 at the time and featured the globe symbol above a small BBC logo in the top left corner of promotions and on captions. The sidebar of captions featured a vague wispy line style, similar to that used by WSTV bulletins. The channel also used a break bumper featuring the globe, and a promo bumper featuring the COW globe split into lines to the side and bottom.

Around the time of the relaunch, BBC WSTV adopted a variation of the flag look later to be used by BBC World, which only featured a BBC logo.

The channel had a permanent DOG of the BBC logo in the top right corner of the screen.

== Rebranding and reorganisation ==
On Thursday, 26 January 1995 at 19:00 GMT, BBC World Service Television was split into two new channels at BBC Television Centre in White City:

- BBC World (since renamed BBC News): 24-hour English free-to-air terrestrial international news channel, officially launched on Monday 16 January 1995 at 19:00 GMT.
- BBC Prime (since replaced by BBC Entertainment): 24-hour English cable lifestyle, variety, and entertainment channel, officially launched on Monday 30 January 1995 at 19:00 GMT.

== See also ==
- BBC TV Europe
- BBC Arabic Television
- BBC World Service
