= Star Movies =

Television channel

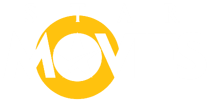
- Logos used in the Balkans and Portugal since 2023; the Middle East since 2024 logo; and 2 variations in India and China since 1 January 2009

Programming
- Picture format: 1080p HDTV

Ownership
- Owner: The Walt Disney Company

History
- Launched: 20 April 1994; 32 years ago (split from Star Plus, Taiwan only); 1 June 1996; 30 years ago (Malaysia); 1 October 2023; 3 years ago (Balkans); 7 February 2024; 2 years ago (Portugal)
- Replaced: BBC World Service Television; Fox Movies (Balkans and Portugal)
- Closed: 1 January 2024; 2 years ago (Taiwan)
- Replaced by: Fox Movies Premium (2012–2017; Southeast Asia); Fox Movies (Philippines, Vietnam, and Taiwan; first incarnation)
- Former names: In Asia: BBC World Service Television Asia (1991–1994)

Star Movies is an Asian-based pay television channel owned by Disney Entertainment. Star Movies was originally launched in 1994 as a single channel broadcast across Asia, but it has since been regionalized into localized channels. Fox Networks Group Asia Pacific has since rebranded some of the network's international feeds in Hong Kong, Taiwan (SD feed only), and Southeast Asia as Fox Movies, but retains the Star Movies brand in the Middle East & South Asia (except Maldives).

Disney Star continues to operate the network's Indian feed as a channel specializing in Western films, and the logo has remained unchanged since 2009. The mainland China feed is operated by Disney Entertainment, launched as a separate channel split from the HK/SEA feed, and since then continues to air. Meanwhile, Disney also operates the Middle Eastern feed, keeping the 2009 logo (still used in India and Mainland China) until adopting the non-Indian/Chinese Star channels' logo scheme in 2024, while Fox Movies was replaced by a new channel, Star Films. In the Balkans and Portugal, the local versions of Fox Movies were replaced by Star Movies. Star Movies in the Middle East, Balkans, and Portugal is managed by The Walt Disney Company.

== History ==
Star Movies began broadcasting on 20 April 1994 for viewers in Taiwan, replacing BBC World Service Television in the Northern Beam region, which was dropped on 17 April 1994. The channel became scrambled on 1 May 1994. The need to launch the channel was based on research on viewers' preferences and feedback from cable operators. At launch, Star Movies was a Mandarin and English movie channel, with 60% of the films in Chinese or produced in Asia and 40% being Western titles. The channel was only available through authorized cable operators.

Star Movies was split up from Star Plus on 1 May 1994, which usually aired movies in the early years of Star TV from 1991 to 1994. At launch, its programming lineup consisted of both Hollywood and Chinese films and catered to pan-Asian audiences.

As Star TV planned to remove BBC World Service Television from its channel lineup for Northeast Asia by mid-April 1994, the company planned to replace it with a Chinese-language film channel. Star Movies would focus on Western world films from then on. Star TV has since regionalized the channel's operation.

The channel was noticeably absent from Singapore Cable Vision upon the launch of its cable service in 1995 due to censorship problems in the country.

On 1 February 1996, the channel changed its logo from a STAR wordmark similar to Zee Cinema in 1995 to a box-type STAR symbol featuring a frame, a pentagram star, and a blue square.

It was launched in Malaysia on 1 June 1996.

A localized feed intended for Taiwan was launched on 1 January 1997, Southeast Asia and China on 1 May 1997, and the Philippines on 1 January 2010. Four months later, a high-definition channel, Star Movies HD, was launched. A video on demand channel was also launched on 16 September of that same year.

On 1 April 1999, the channel had its first major logo change from vertical to horizontal, along with other STAR TV channels.

On 1 January 2012, Star Movies was rebranded as Fox Movies Premium and became available in Hong Kong, the Maldives, and most Southeast Asian countries.

On 10 June 2017, the channel's Philippine feed was rebranded as Fox Movies Philippines. In other Southeast Asian countries and Hong Kong, Fox Movies Premium rebranded to Fox Movies on the same day. The channel shut down on 1 October 2021 in these regions, along with other local versions of several Disney- and Fox-branded channels.

On New Year's Day 2022, Fox Movies Taiwan was renamed under the new name Star Movies Gold, so that Star Movies HD remains active with the programming separate from each other. As Disney decided to further expand Disney+ across the Asian markets, they had decided to cease further pay TV broadcasting, including both Star Movies Gold and Star Movies HD. Both of the channels were ceased in operation on 1 January 2024.

On 7 June 2023, Disney announced that it would launch Star Movies in the Balkans as a replacement for Fox Movies in the region on 1 October 2023. Disney would later announce that it would also replace Fox Movies in Portugal (in addition to Angola and Mozambique) with Star Movies on 7 February 2024.

== Programming ==
Star Movies has first-run contracts for movies distributed by Disney (20th Century Studios, Pixar, Marvel Studios) and sub-run contracts for movies from countries where Star Movies is available. It also features movies from other movie distributors, including Paramount Pictures, Lionsgate, Summit Entertainment, and The Weinstein Company. Star Movies mainly airs Disney movies during the daytime hours. Star Movies India does fewer premieres compared to sometimes showing programs like Masterchef Australia and pushing more premium movies into their OTT platform Disney+ Hotstar.

== Current feeds ==
=== Star Movies (India) ===
Star Movies India is distributed by Walt Disney Studios, Pixar, Marvel Studios and 20th Century Studios in India, Nepal, Sri Lanka and Bangladesh and is ad-supported. Movie premieres are less frequent compared to other feeds. Other studios include Lionsgate, NBCUniversal and Warner Bros. Discovery. The audio feeds available were English, Hindi, and Tamil. The channel ceased broadcasting in Nepal and Sri Lanka from 1 February 2015 due to content rights issues, leaving the country with no Star Movies or Fox Movies channel. The channel was relaunched in Nepal and Sri Lanka in 2019 after 4 years.

Star Movies Select HD was launched on 9 July 2015, showcasing niche films. An SD feed was launched on 15 March 2023 along with the launches and shutdowns of several other Star channels.

=== Star Movies (MENA) ===
Star Movies Middle East and Africa features a hardcoded Arabic-language subtitle track (except for Israel). The channel is currently available on beIN and was formerly available on OSN (as of 1 January 2024).

On 1 March 2024, Star Movies MENA rebranded for the first time in 16 years and stopped using its 2009 logo (which is still used in India and Mainland China).

=== Star Movies (Balkans) ===
Managed with The Walt Disney Company Bulgaria. Features numerous films from 20th Century Studios, Disney, Columbia Pictures, Pixar, Marvel Studios, Metro-Goldwyn-Mayer, and DreamWorks. On 7 June 2023, it was announced that Fox Movies would be rebranded to Star Movies on 1 October 2023.

=== Star Movies (Portugal) ===
It was launched on 1 July 2011, replacing the series and cinema channel Fox Next. FOX Movies is accompanied by a high definition version, FOX Movies HD, which began broadcasting on 15 July 2011 exclusively on MEO. The channel is also available in Angola and Mozambique, through the operator ZAP, where Fox Next was previously also available. In African and European territory, FOX Movies and FOX Movies HD are available on a subscription basis. Fox Movies was rebranded to Star Movies on 7 February 2024.

== Former feeds ==
=== Star Movies Action ===
It was launched on 2 June 2013 only in India, replacing Fox Action Movies (not to be confused with its Southeast Asian counterpart) after its temporary closure on 11 May 2013. The channel airs action- and horror-themed movies. In 2017, the channel was shut down.

=== Star Movies Gold and Star Movies HD (Taiwan) ===
An ad-supported feed of Star Movies was launched for Taiwan specifically. It was the most localised feed of the television network, since most voice-overs in promotions for upcoming movies were done in Mandarin Chinese. The SD feed of the channel was rebranded as Fox Movies Taiwan on 18 January 2018, while the HD feed still retains its independent programming and branding. On 1 January 2022, Fox Movies Taiwan was rebranded to Star Movies Gold. On 1 January 2024, the Taiwanese versions of Star Movies Gold and Star Movies HD were discontinued.

=== Star Movies (China) ===
Star Movies channel in China was launched in the late 2000s/early 2010s, separated from its main (Hong Kong/SEA) feed. However, unlike its main feed, which changed to Fox Movies (closed in 2021), this channel maintained its own format, airing movies in English with Chinese subtitles, including ad breaks in between movies showing promos for upcoming movies.

It is one of the few channels in the mainland China outside Hong Kong (along with Star Sports and National Geographic Channel) that are continued to operate by Disney due to China's broadcast regulation laws prohibiting foreign entities from operating online streaming services like Disney+ (and despite Star's previous owner 21st Century Fox had sold Star China, which does not own that channel, to China Media Capital).

== See also ==
- Star Films
- Fox Movies Southeast Asia
- Fox Family Movies
- Fox Action Movies
