= Star Movies (Balkans) =

Movie channel in the Balkans

- Country: Albania; Bosnia and Herzegovina; Croatia; Kosovo; Montenegro; North Macedonia; Serbia; Slovenia
- Headquarters: Sofia, Bulgaria

Programming
- Language: English (audio)
- Picture format: 576i (SDTV); 1080i (HDTV)

Ownership
- Owner: The Walt Disney Company Bulgaria (Disney Entertainment)
- Sister channels: Star Channel; Star Life; National Geographic Channel; Nat Geo Wild; BabyTV; 24Kitchen; Star Crime

History
- Launched: 15 October 2012; 13 years ago

Links
- Website: http://starchannel-rs.com/ (Serbia) http://www.starchannel-si.com/ (Slovenia) https://www.starchanneltv-hr.com/ (Croatia)

Star Movies is a television network, managed by The Walt Disney Company Bulgaria, which airs across several countries in Europe. Its basic programming includes numerous productions by 20th Century Studios, Disney, Columbia Pictures, Pixar, Marvel Studios, Metro-Goldwyn-Mayer, and DreamWorks.

It was launched in Bulgaria and other Balkan countries as Fox Movies on 15 October 2012. On 7 June 2023, it was announced that Fox Movies would be rebrand to Star Movies on October 1, 2023. It is a Hollywood movie channel whose main competitor is HBO Europe.

== See also ==
- Star Movies (Indian TV channel)
- Star Movies
