= Fox Action Movies =

Defunct Asian television channel

Fox Action Movies (Southeast Asian) TV Channel
- Logo used in Hong Kong and the South East Asia region from 2017 to 2021 and in the MENA region from 2017 to 2022

- Logo used in the MENA region from 2022 to 2024
- Country: Singapore; Malaysia; Hong Kong
- Broadcast area: Hong Kong; Southeast Asia (except Timor-Leste); Middle East and North Africa
- Headquarters: Hong Kong

Programming
- Picture format: 1080i HDTV

Ownership
- Owner: Fox Networks Group Asia Pacific (Disney International Operations)
- Sister channels: List: Fox Movies (closed) Fox Family Movies (closed) Star Chinese Movies Fox Sports (closed) Channel V (closed) Fox Life (closed) Fox Crime (closed) FX (closed) Fox (closed) National Geographic; (closed)

History
- Launched: 1 October 2012; 14 years ago
- Closed: 1 January 2021; 5 years ago (Vietnam); 1 October 2021; 5 years ago (pan-Asian feed); 1 March 2024; 2 years ago (Middle East and North Africa)
- Replaced by: Star Action (Middle East and North Africa)

Links
- Website: Archived official website at the Wayback Machine (archived 2021-07-11)

Fox Action Movies was a Southeast Asian pay television channel centered towards broadcasting action-themed and horror-themed films. It is owned by Fox Networks Group Asia Pacific. The channel's feed-in India was rebranded as Star Movies Action on 2 June 2013 while the Asian counterpart continued broadcasting. 5.1 Dolby Sound is available on HD channel only.

On 1 January 2015, the joint venture of SCTV and Fox International Channel (now Fox Networks Group), released Fox Action Movies Vietnam only on SCTV16.

On 1 January 2021, Fox Action Movies stopped broadcasting through SCTV16 channel in Vietnam.

After 9 years of broadcasting, Fox Action Movies and 17 other Fox/Disney-owned channels across Southeast Asia ceased broadcasting on 1 October 2021. The last movie to air on the channel was Big Freaking Rat. However, the Middle East and North Africa feed operated until 1 March 2024, when it was rebranded as Star Action, adopted the name of one of multiplex Star Premium channels in Latin America that was used in 2021.

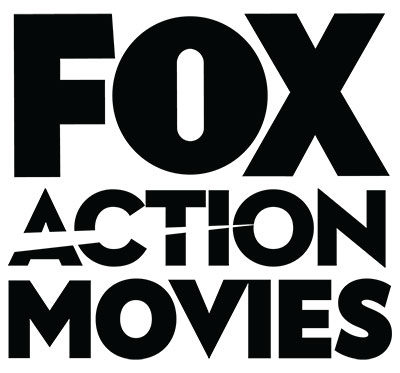
Former logo of Fox Action Movies, used until 2017.

== Fox Action Movies around the world ==
Market	Type	Formerly	Launch date	Replacement	Replaced date
Fox Action Movies (Middle East)	Middle East and North Africa	-	1 October 2012	Star Action	1 March 2024
Fox Movies Action (Middle East, Lebanon)	Middle East and North Africa	-	1 March 2019	-	-
Fox Action Movies (Southeast Asia)	Southeast Asia and Hong Kong	-	1 October 2012	discontinued	1 January 2021 (Vietnam) 1 October 2021

== See also ==
- Astro (company)
- Fox Movies
- Fox Family Movies
