= Star Chinese Movies =

Chinese language pay TV channel, 1994–2023

Star Chinese Movies 衛視電影台
- Broadcast area: Southeast Asia; Hong Kong; Macau; Taiwan; Japan; South Korea; Mongolia
- Headquarters: Hong Kong; Taipei, Taiwan

Programming
- Languages: Mandarin; Cantonese
- Picture format: HDTV 1080i

Ownership
- Owner: The Walt Disney Company (Taiwan) Limited
- Sister channels: Star Chinese Channel

History
- Launched: 1 May 1994; 32 years ago (Taiwan); 1 June 1996; 30 years ago (Malaysia, Astro; first incarnation)
- Closed: 31 August 1997; 29 years ago (Malaysia, Astro; first incarnation); 28 August 1998; 28 years ago (Southeast Asia, Hong Kong, Macau, and Mainland China; first incarnation); 1 October 2021; 4 years ago (Malaysia, Astro; second incarnation); 1 October 2023; 2 years ago (Southeast Asia, Hong Kong, and Macau; second incarnation); 1 January 2024; 2 years ago (Taiwan)
- Replaced by: Phoenix Movies Channel (Southeast Asia and Mainland China); Catchplay Movie Channel (Taiwan); Astro AEC (Malaysia, Astro)
- Former names: Star Mandarin Movies (1 May 1994 – 31 March 1996)

Star Chinese Movies (Chinese: 衛視電影台) was a Chinese-language pay television channel owned by The Walt Disney Company (Taiwan) Limited. The channel mainly broadcast Chinese-language films (including Chinese, Cantonese, Taiwanese, Singaporean, and Malaysian films), as well as bilingual Japanese films, Japanese animations (TV series and films), Korean films, Thai films, and digitally restored classic Hong Kong action films. At the time of the channel's expansion into Thailand and Indonesia, its owner, Fox International Channels, claimed that it was the most widely distributed Chinese-language entertainment channel.

== History ==
The channel launched on 1 May 1994 as Star Mandarin Movies, replacing BBC World Service Television. At the time, it screened both Hollywood and international blockbusters and Chinese-language films, and focused on a pan-Asian audience. It was split into two television channels: Star Movies International (now Fox Movies) and Star Mandarin Movies (now Star Chinese Movies).

The channel's film library during its launch was acquired by Star Chinese Channel, which originally launched in 1991. It shared the Western feed for two years and aired Western movies at various times.

On 1 February 1996, the logo changed from the STAR wordmark to a box-type star logo. It continued to air Western movies (presented in their original language with Traditional Chinese subtitles) until 30 June 1998.

On 31 March 1996, Star Movies split its English and Chinese content. Star Chinese Movies focused on Southeast Asia (including Taiwan), Hong Kong, Macau, and mainland China. It aired in several markets, including on Astro (Malaysia) and SKY PerfecTV! (Japan). It launched in Malaysia on 1 June 1996.

The channel ceased broadcasting across Malaysia on 31 August 1997 at 23:59 Malaysia Time. On 28 August 1998 at 19:00 Hong Kong Time, Star TV split Star Chinese Movies into specific regional feeds, reducing its broadcasting area to just Taiwan. Viewers in Southeast Asia, Hong Kong, Macau, and mainland China were offered Phoenix Movies Channel instead, while Malaysia was offered Astro AEC.

On 1 July 1998, the channel became a purely Chinese-language movie channel, dropping Western movies. On 1 April 1999, the channel underwent its first major logo change from vertical to horizontal, alongside other STAR TV channels.

On 26 September 2003, Star Chinese Movies launched on Now TV in Hong Kong. A similar launch subsequently occurred in Singapore and the Philippines. On the same day, it relaunched localized feeds in Hong Kong and Macau (in Cantonese), Singapore (in Mandarin), Southeast Asia (in Mandarin), and Malaysia (Southeast Asian feed in Cantonese).

On 25 January 2008, a sister channel named Star Chinese Movies 2 was launched; the HD and VOD channels launched a few years later. On 19 May 2012, the channel's logo changed from a star to a stylized crown.

On 1 November 2013, the channel expanded to more countries, including Thailand and Indonesia. On 1 September 2014, it launched on HyppTV in Malaysia, returning the channel to the country after 16 years. On 29 April 2017, Star Chinese Movies began providing bilingual services, with most movies broadcast simultaneously in Mandarin and their original language.

The channel also obtained pay TV broadcasting rights for the Hong Kong Film Awards and the Golden Horse Awards for Hong Kong, Macau, and Southeast Asia (except Singapore and Malaysia, where broadcasting rights were sold to local broadcasters).

As Disney — which had previously acquired Fox International Networks — decided to further roll out Disney+ across Asian markets, it decided to cease its pay TV operations, including Star Chinese Movies. The channel ceased operation in Southeast Asia, Hong Kong, and Macau on 1 October 2023, while the Taiwanese feed (alongside its separate HD feed) closed on 1 January 2024.

== Feeds ==
Country/Region	Star Chinese Movies	Star Chinese Movies Legend
Taiwan	1 May 1994 – 31 December 2023; launched alongside separate Star Chinese Movies HD (星衛HD電影台)	None
Hong Kong; Macau (localized)	Star Chinese Movies (衛視電影台): First incarnation: 1 May 1994 – 28 August 1998; Second incarnation: 21 February 2004 – 30 September 2023; Phoenix Movies Channel (鳳凰衛視電影台): 28 August 1998 – present	15 December 2007 – 30 September 2021
Singapore (localized)	Star Chinese Movies (衛視電影台): First incarnation: 1 May 1994 – 28 August 1998; Second incarnation: 21 February 2004 – 30 September 2023; Phoenix Movies Channel (鳳凰衛視電影台): 28 August 1998 – present	15 December 2007 – 30 September 2021
Maldives; Papua New Guinea; Southeast Asia	Star Chinese Movies (衛視電影台): First incarnation: 1 May 1994 – 28 August 1998; Second incarnation: 21 February 2004 – 30 September 2023; Phoenix Movies Channel (鳳凰衛視電影台): 28 August 1998 – present	15 December 2007 – 30 September 2021
Malaysia (SEA feed; in Cantonese)	Star Chinese Movies (衛視電影台): First incarnation: 1 May 1994 – 28 August 1998; Second incarnation: 21 February 2004 – 30 September 2023; Phoenix Movies Channel (鳳凰衛視電影台): 28 August 1998 – present	15 December 2007 – 30 September 2021
Australia; New Zealand	Australia: 2013–2018; New Zealand: 1 March 2016 – 28 February 2018	None
Canada; United States	2010–2018 (Titles from SCM Legend lasted until 2013)	None

== Star Chinese Movies Legend ==
Star Chinese Movies Legend
- Country: Singapore
- Broadcast area: Southeast Asia; Hong Kong; Macau

Programming
- Language: Cantonese

Ownership
- Owner: Fox Networks Group Asia Pacific; (Disney International Operations)

History
- Launched: 15 December 2007; 18 years ago
- Closed: 1 October 2021; 4 years ago
- Former names: Star Chinese Movies 2 (2007–2012)

Star Chinese Movies Legend (Chinese: 衛視卡式台) (also known as SCM Legend) was a sister movie channel of Star Chinese Movies based in Singapore. First launched on 25 January 2008 as Star Chinese Movies 2 (衛視電影2台), it was rebranded on 1 October 2012 as Star Chinese Movies Legend. The channel broadcast older films from British Hong Kong, specifically those released between 1 January 1970 and 31 December 1992. The 23-year period was officially the main production era covered by STAR TV Filmed Entertainment.

As Disney continued to expand Disney+ across Asian territories, it decided to shut down many of its pay TV channels, including Star Chinese Movies Legend, on 1 October 2021.
