= Fox (Asian TV channel) =

Defunct Asian TV channel (1998–2024)

Fox Asia
- Country: China (main); Singapore; India
- Broadcast area: East Asia
- Headquarters: Hong Kong SAR, China

Programming
- Language: English
- Picture format: 1080i HDTV

Ownership
- Owner: Fox Networks Group Asia Pacific (Disney International Operations)

History
- Launched: February 1998 (Japan); 1 April 2006 (South Korea); December 2009 (Asia); 16 June 2010 (Malaysia); June 2010 (Vietnam); 1 September 2012 (Taiwan); 8 September 2015 (Thailand); 1 October 2015 (Philippines)
- Replaced: Channel V (Taiwan)
- Closed: 16 November 2014 (SD feed, Malaysia); 1 January 2021; 5 years ago (South Korea); March 9, 2021; 5 years ago (Starhub TV); May 1, 2021; 5 years ago (SD feed, Vietnam); September 1, 2021; 5 years ago (Now TV feed, Hong Kong); October 1, 2021; 5 years ago (Southeast Asia and Hong Kong); 1 January 2022; 4 years ago (Taiwan); 1 March 2024; 2 years ago (Japan)
- Replaced by: Star World (Taiwan); CH.NOW (South Korea); Dlife (Japan); Disney+/Hulu (Southeast Asia, Hong Kong and Taiwan)

Fox was a pan-Asian pay television channel, owned and operated by Fox Networks Group Asia Pacific, a subsidiary of Disney International Operations.

The network operated six subnetworks, all solely branded as Fox; one pan-Asian feed meant for East Asia, then individual feeds for Japan, Thailand, The Philippines, Taiwan, and Vietnam. All of the networks carried network programming with the original English audio from its imported programmes, along with either subtitling or second audio feeds in each nation's dominant language. It also held a brand licensing deal with Tcast until the end of 2020 for a domestic version of Fox in South Korea. The Japanese feed was replaced by the second iteration of Dlife on March 1, 2024.

== History ==
In Japan, the channel launched in February 1998 along with other Fox channels such as Fox Crime and Fox Life.

In Asia, the channel was in test broadcast in December 2009, broadcasting US TV series on loop. The first Asian provider who carried Fox was SkyCable in the Philippines which launched the channel on 4 January 2010, followed by StarHub TV in Singapore on 1 February 2010. Other TV providers across the region followed thereafter.

Around early-to-mid-February 2012, the Fox wordmark was changed to the Fox HD wordmark (pictured) for all Fox commercials on all Fox channels in the Asian and Filipino television provider networks, including channels which were not in HD. This change was similar to the one done to Star World, FX, Fox Crime, and Channel V. The reason for this change is unknown.

Fox Japan and Fox Korea are considered separated from the main feed as they have different programming. However, they are closely linked as they shared most of their commercials and the programming are nearly the same.

Fox Taiwan was officially launched on 1 September 2012, as FOX Showbiz (Chinese: 娛樂台) replacing Channel V Taiwan. This feed's broadcast Asian programming and some of American series reruns with Chinese subtitles, and FOX HD Asia feed are available through MOD and some of cable providers. The feed was renamed Fox in January 2014 and broadcast both local and foreign programmes.

In 2020, due to the ongoing expansion of the Star brand internationally, Tcast, the licensor for the Fox channels in South Korea, announced that it had terminated its license agreement with Disney's domestic division, rebranding its channels after 31 December 2020. Fox in South Korea then became CH.NOW.

On 31 August 2021, the Fox Networks Group channels ended operations in Hong Kong. The entire Fox Networks Group suite in Asia (outside networks in Taiwan and Japan) subsequently ended operations at the end of 30 September 2021, along with the German and African versions of Fox, with most of its content transferred to Disney+.

On 1 January 2022, Fox Taiwan was renamed to Star World, marking the return of the Star World brand in Taiwan after it closed on 1 February 2020.

Despite all these closures, Fox in Japan has continued to operate during this time. However on December 5, 2023, Disney announced that Fox in Japan would be replaced by the second incarnation of Dlife on March 1, 2024.
