= Fox Movies (Southeast Asian TV channel) =

Defunct Movies-themed channel in Southeast Asia

- Broadcast area: Fiji; Hong Kong; Macau; Maldives; Papua New Guinea; most of Southeast Asia
- Headquarters: Hong Kong

Programming
- Picture format: 1080i HDTV

Ownership
- Owner: Fox Networks Group Asia Pacific (Disney International Operations)
- Sister channels: Fox Action Movies; Fox Family Movies

History
- Launched: 10 June 2017; 9 years ago (Southeast Asia)
- Closed: 1 October 2021; 4 years ago (pan-Asian feed)
- Former names: Star Movies; Fox Movies Premium

Links
- Website: Archived official website at the Wayback Machine (archived 2021-07-11)

Fox Movies (formerly Star Movies and Fox Movies Premium) was a Southeast Asian movie network owned by Fox Networks Group Asia Pacific, subsidiaries of International Operations unit of The Walt Disney Company.

With the launch of Disney+ Hotstar/Disney+ across Asia, several first-run films from Disney-owned properties were removed in favour of re-runs, including Marvel films that were produced by other studios. Indonesian feed was the first to be affected from September 1, 2020, before Singapore and Malaysia from February 1, 2021. The change was affected in most of available feeds across Asia, before the channel shutdown that was announced.

== History ==
=== As Fox Movies Premium ===
On 1 January 2012, Star Movies was rebranded to Fox Movies Premium, available in Hong Kong and selected Southeast Asian countries.

=== As Fox Movies ===
To tie in with the premiere of the 2016 film X-Men Apocalypse, Fox Movies Premium in Southeast Asia and Star Movies in the Philippines (SD only), rebranded to Fox Movies on June 10, 2017.

On November 1, 2017, Star Movies Vietnam was rebranded as Fox Movies Vietnam.

On January 18, 2018, Star Movies Taiwan was rebranded as Fox Movies Taiwan, yet Star Movies HD Taiwan remains the original name.

==== Fox Movies Asia ====
Fox Movies Asia (formerly known as Fox Movies Premium) was transmitted in Parts of Southeast Asia. It was the only advertisement free version of Fox Movies and, unlike other versions of Fox Movies, this version also spent minimal time promoting its own upcoming movies. The channel did not air promotions of movies classified as unsuitable for people aged under eighteen until 8 pm (or 9 pm for Malaysia). This channel broadcast movies in their catalog for 24 hours a day. 5.1 Dolby Surround sound was available and applicable on the HD channel.

==== Fox Movies Philippines ====
On June 10, 2017, Star Movies (Philippines, SD only) was rebranded as Fox Movies. Like its predecessor, it also has English subtitles daily, as well as local advertisements when the movie is taking a break (its HD counterpart, however, does not because of the HD channel formerly using its Asian feed (Fox Movies Premium) and Fox Movies Asia feed). The channel typically broadcasts action, comedy, animation and horror/suspense films every day and drama films on early morning.

On June 12, 2017, the HD channel was converted into Philippine feed during independence day of the Philippines while the Asia feed will continue to broadcast via live streaming on a subscription-based FOX+ which is available to Cignal, Globe, Smart and PLDT Home subscribers and with Chinese subtitles on their movies (along with Fox Family Movies and Fox Action Movies) which was later removed and replaced by Fox Sports including (2 & 3).

==== Revert to Asian feed and shutdown ====
On January 1, 2020, Fox Movies Philippines, along with its Philippine-based operating channels: Fox Life, Fox, and National Geographic SD, were reverted to their main Southeast Asian feed. The channel started showing main feed plugs and retained the English subtitles on the movie after the revert, but this feed still initiates a local opt-out after a movie and a lesser ad break in the middle of the movie to accommodate local advertisements. The channel premieres major blockbuster films every Saturday as well as independent and low-budget films on Mondays and Thursdays.

Fox Movies, along with other Disney-owned Fox channels across Southeast Asia and Hong Kong, ceased operations on October 1, 2021.

== See also ==
- Star Movies
- Fox Family Movies
- Fox Action Movies
