= Fox Family Movies =

Defunct Asian family movie channel

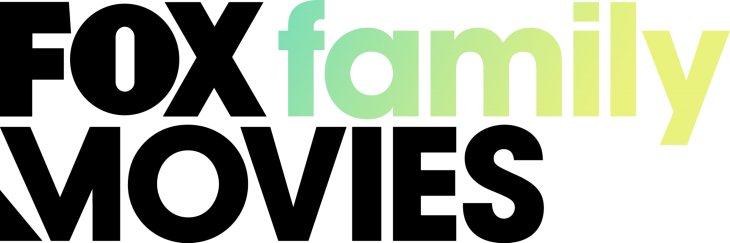
- Logo used in Hong Kong and the South East Asia region from 2017 to 2021 and in the MENA region from 2017 to 2022

- Logo used in the MENA region throughout 2022
- Broadcast area: Fiji; Hong Kong; Macau; Maldives; Papua New Guinea; Southeast Asia
- Headquarters: Hong Kong

Programming
- Language: English
- Picture format: 1080i HDTV

Ownership
- Owner: Fox Networks Group Asia Pacific (Disney International Operations)
- Sister channels: List: Fox Movies (closed); Fox Action Movies (closed); Star Chinese Movies (closed); Star Sports (closed); Channel V (closed); Fox Life (closed); Fox Crime (closed); FX (closed); Fox (closed); Fox Sports (closed); Fox News Channel; National Geographic (closed); National Geographic Wild (closed); Disney Channel (2019-2021); Disney Junior (2019-2021); Disney XD (2019-2021)

History
- Launched: 16 September 2010; 16 years ago
- Closed: 1 October 2021 (pan-Asian feed); 1 December 2022 (MENA feed)
- Replaced by: Disney+/Disney+ Hotstar (de facto)

Fox Family Movies was a pay television channel owned by Fox Networks Group, a subsidiary of Disney International Operations. The channel was initially available in Singapore since 16 September 2010. and continued rolling to Southeast Asia.

It had first-run contracts for movies distributed by Disney, (20th Century Studios), (Walt Disney Pictures), Universal Pictures, Paramount Pictures, Metro-Goldwyn-Mayer, Warner Bros., StudioCanal, as well as featured movies from other movie distributors including Lionsgate, Summit Entertainment and The Weinstein Company. Unlike Fox Movies and Fox Action Movies this channel was also available in Dual Language for some movies.

== Overview and History ==
The channel was first launched in Singapore via StarHub on 16 September 2010.

The channel is also available in Middle East and North Africa region since 2016 along with Fox Action Movies and FX when Fox Networks Group Middle East signed a deal with Ericsson to provide playout services for the new channels.

The channel ceased its broadcast on 1 October 2021, along with other Disney-owned channels, concluding with Annabelle Hooper and the Ghosts of Nantucket. Meanwhile, the Middle East and North Africa feed of the channel continued operating until December 1, 2022, therefore ceasing the channel to exist.

== Fox Family Movies around the world ==
Market	Type	Formerly	Launch date	Replacement	Replaced date
Fox Family Movies (Middle East)	Middle East and North Africa	-	September 16, 2010	discontinued	December 1, 2022
Fox Family Movies (Middle East)	Middle East and North Africa	-	January 1, 2022	-	-
Fox Family Movies (Southeast Asia)	Southeast Asia and Hong Kong	-	September 16, 2010	discontinued	October 1, 2021
