= Star World =

Asian English-language general entertainment television channel

- Logo used in the Middle East and North Africa since 2024

Programming
- Language: English

Ownership
- Owner: The Walt Disney Company

History
- Launched: 15 December 1991; 34 years ago; 1 January 2001; 25 years ago (Taiwan; first incarnation); 1 January 2022; 4 years ago (Taiwan; second and final incarnation)
- Replaced: Fox Taiwan (relaunch)
- Closed: 1 October 2017; 8 years ago (Southeast Asia and Hong Kong); 1 February 2020; 6 years ago (Taiwan; first incarnation); 15 March 2023; 3 years ago (India); 1 January 2024; 2 years ago (Taiwan; second and final incarnation)
- Replaced by: Fox Life
- Former names: Star Plus (1991–1996)

Star World, currently stylized logo-wise in capital letters and formerly known as Star Entertainment Channel and Star Plus respectively, is an Asian English language entertainment television channel originally launched on 15 December 1991 by Star TV in Hong Kong as the old iteration of Star Plus. Originally available in Southeast Asia and Hong Kong, as well as India and South Asia, since 2024 it is only available in the Middle East and North Africa after the closure of the Indian and Taiwanese feeds.

On 30 March 1996, the channel was split into two, when the former became Star World in East and Southeast Asia part of STAR TV's rebranding, and the latter retained the Star Plus name in India and the Middle East. However, after Star (subsequently acquired by News Corporation) ended its partnership with Zee TV on 30 June 2000, Star Plus was transformed into a Hindi-language channel on 1 July 2000, with Star World being already introduced in the region as an English entertainment replacement.

The channel's programming line-up mostly consists of entertainment television programmes from the United States, the United Kingdom and sometimes Australia and New Zealand to appeal to English-speaking locals.

== History ==
Star World was first launched on 15 December 1991, showcasing international content from the United States, United Kingdom and Australia.

On 31 March 1996, STAR TV split Star Plus' beam into two, providing two separate services for different regional audiences within STAR TV's footprint. This enabled the channel to provide appropriate programming and viewing time for viewers from different Asian regions. Star Plus would serve viewers in India and the Middle East from then on, while the new Star World channel welcomed those in East and Southeast Asia. Star TV converted Star Plus into Hindi entertainment channel with some English content programming. Earlier, STAR TV had a joint venture with Zee Telefilms, uplinking Hindi channel Zee TV from Hong Kong. But that partnership with that channel ended on 30 June 2000, resulted from the new Star World channel as an English entertainment replacement on 1 July 2000 for India and the Middle East.

On 1 April 1999, Star World, Star Movies, Star Sports, Star Gold, Star Plus, and SCM would receive their first major logo change as part of STAR TV's brand refresh.

On 1 October 2017, the Hong Kong and Southeast Asian version of Star World was rebranded to Fox Life, and shut down after exactly four years, on 1 October 2021.

Logo used in 2015–2017 in Hong Kong, Singapore, Malaysia, Philippines, Indonesia, Vietnam and Thailand, and in 2015–2020 and 2022–2024 in Taiwan. Never used in India, the Middle East, and North Africa.

On 1 February 2020, the Taiwanese feed closed and some programs were moved to Fox. On 1 January 2022, Star World replaced the Taiwanese feed of Fox, marking the return of the Star World brand in Taiwan. Disney, which had previously brought FOX International Networks, decided to launch Disney+ in more Asian markets, and decided to discontinue pay TV broadcasting, including Star World in Taiwan. The channel ceased for the second time on 1 January 2024.

On 15 March 2023, the Indian version of Star World in both SD and HD feeds, as well as Star World Premiere HD, ceased broadcasting along with the launches and shutdowns of several other channels from Disney Star. As a result, Star World remains on air only in the Middle East and North Africa.

On 1 March 2024, Star World MENA underwent a rebranding and introduced a new logo and graphics package, along with five other Disney-operated channels in the region, many of which abandoned the Fox brand; moreover, its sister channel Star Movies shed its 2009 logo (still used in India and mainland China) and introduced a new logo.

== Current channel ==
- Star World Middle East & North Africa - broadcast times KSA, UAE and PAK.

== Former channels ==
- Star World Taiwan - broadcast times NST; some programs were not the same as the Asia feed, including local advertisements. The channel was relaunched on 1 January 2022, only to cease operations exactly two years later, on 1 January 2024.
- Star World Vietnam - broadcast times VN; some programs were not the same as the Asia feed, including local advertisements. The channel ceased operations on 1 October 2017.
- Star World HD Asia - same as the Asia feed except for the logo and commercial feed; feed was only available in selected territories. The channel ceased operations on 1 October 2017.
- Star World Asia - broadcast times HKT/SIN/MAL and JKT/BKK. The channel ceased operations on 1 October 2017.
- Star World Philippines - broadcast times PH; some programs were not the same as Asia feed including local commercials and some local programs; a subsidiary of Fox Networks Group Philippines. The channel ceased operations on 1 October 2017.
- Star World HD Philippines - same as the Philippines feed except for the logo and commercial feed; launched on 1 March 2012; a subsidiary of Fox Networks Group Philippines. The channel ceased operations on 1 October 2017.
- Star World HD Vietnam - same as the Vietnam feed except for the logo and commercial feed. The channel ceased operations on 1 October 2017.
- Star World India - broadcast times IST; some programs were different from the other feeds; this is the only feed managed by Star India (not by Fox Networks Group). The channel ceased operations on 15 March 2023. It used the same logo from 2008 until its closure, never adopting the logo introduced in other regions in 2010 and 2013.
- Star World HD India - same as the India feed except for the logo and commercial feed; launched on 15 April 2011; only available in India and Nepal. The channel ceased operations on 15 March 2023. It used the same logo from 2008 until its closure, never adopting the logo introduced in other regions in 2010 and 2013.
- Star World Premiere HD - broadcast times IST; a premium channel launched on 26 September 2013 in India offering the latest seasons of the biggest shows in American television. The channel ceased operations on 15 March 2023.
