= Fox Life =

International television channel

- Country: United States
- Headquarters: 1211 Avenue of the Americas, New York, New York

Programming
- Languages: English, Spanish
- Picture format: HDTV 1080i
- Timeshift service: Fox Life +1

Ownership
- Owner: International: Fox Networks Group (Disney International Operations); United States: Walt Disney Television; News Corporation; 21st Century Fox
- Sister channels: 24Kitchen; Fox Crime; Fox; FX; BabyTV; National Geographic REN TV

History
- Launched: List: 13 May 2004; 22 years ago (first broadcast in Italy); 1 July 2005; 21 years ago (Latin America); 4 November 2013; 13 years ago (United States); 1 October 2017; 9 years ago (Southeast Asia & Hong Kong); 28 September 2017; 9 years ago (Middle East)
- Closed: List: 31 December 2009; 16 years ago (France); 30 September 2011; 15 years ago (Japan); 16 January 2015; 11 years ago (Poland); 22 September 2015; 11 years ago (Flanders); 31 December 2016; 9 years ago (Netherlands); 1 July 2020; 6 years ago (Italy); 30 September 2020; 6 years ago (Africa); 1 January 2021; 5 years ago (South Korea and Turkey); 22 February 2021; 5 years ago (Latin America as Fox Life); 16 March 2021; 5 years ago (SD Feed, Malaysia); 1 September 2021; 5 years ago (Now TV feed, Hong Kong); 1 October 2021; 5 years ago (Southeast Asia and Hong Kong); 1 January 2022; 4 years ago (Spain); 1 April 2022; 4 years ago (United States) (Latin America as Star Life); 1 October 2022; 4 years ago (Russia and Belarus); 15 March 2023; 3 years ago (Greece); 1 October 2023; 3 years ago (Bulgaria and Balkans); 24 January 2024; 2 years ago (Baltics and CIS); 7 February 2024; 2 years ago (Portugal); 1 March 2024; 2 years ago (Middle East); 13 April 2024; 2 years ago (India)
- Replaced by: Fox (Flanders); Fox Sports (Japan); Fox Comedy (Poland); Star Life (Latin America, Bulgaria, Balkans, Portugal, Middle East and India); CH.ever (South Korea); FX Life (Greece, Baltics and CIS); САПФИР (Russia)
- Former names: Star Plus/World (Southeast Asia); Fox Traveller (India); Utilisma Satelital (1996–2001); Utilisma (2001–2013)

Links
- Website: Portugal UK & Ireland

Fox Life, now rebranded as Star Life and FX Life, was an international pay television network, launched by the Fox Networks Group in 2004. The network has been discontinued in several markets over time.

The network's scheduling has varied with each version, ranging from traditional entertainment programming, including television series, sitcoms and movies, among others, original programming in certain regions, and instructional and aspirational reality television on some other variations; in North America for instance, the network carried mainly Spanish language dubbed versions of American reality shows and instructional programming. The channel has been owned by International Operations division of The Walt Disney Company since March 2019.

== History ==
Fox Life was first launched in Italy on 13 May 2004, in Portugal on 19 May 2005, and Bulgaria on 8 September 2005. For Latin America, it started in July 2006, when it was launched in Brazil. The channel also has versions in other countries around Europe. It launched in the Netherlands and Flanders on 7 September 2009. Fox Life launched in the United States on 4 November 2013.

=== Flemish version ===
As of 22 November 2011, Fox had to change the programming for Fox Life in Flanders due to television rights issues in Belgium. From then on, a separate Flemish version was airing in Belgium. It used to air the Dutch version. The provider of satellite television in the Netherlands, Canal Digitaal, had to replace Fox Life with the Finnish version as well because it shared the Fox Life feed with the Belgium provider of satellite television, TV Vlaanderen Digitaal.

=== Launch in Southeast Asia ===
On 1 October 2017, the Hong Kong and Southeast Asian version of Star World was rebranded to Fox Life.

Fox Life
- Country: Hong Kong
- Broadcast area: Southeast Asia/ASEAN, and Hong Kong
- Headquarters: Kowloon Peninsula, Hong Kong

Programming
- Language: Hong Kong English
- Picture format: HDTV 1080i SDTV 576i (downscaled)

Ownership
- Owner: Fox Networks Group Asia Pacific (Disney International Operations)

History
- Launched: 1 October 2017; 9 years ago
- Closed: 1 October 2021; 5 years ago

=== Rebranding/closing in Europe ===
From 22 September 2015, Fox Life has been replaced by 24Kitchen for satellite viewers in the Netherlands. The Finnish Fox Life was rebranded as Fox.

Fox Networks Group Benelux announced that Fox Life would officially close in the Netherlands on 31 December 2016.

=== Rebranding/closing in Latin America ===
On 27 November 2020, Fox announced that they would be renaming the Fox branded channels in Latin America to Star Life on 22 February 2021. The networks closed on 1 April 2022, along with the American version.

=== Closing in Southeast Asia ===
From 1 September 2021, FOX Life along with most of The Walt Disney Company channels (Fox Crime, Fox, FX, Disney Junior, Disney Channel, Nat Geo People, Fox Movies, Fox Action Movies, Fox Family Movies, Star Movies China, SCM Legend, and five of its sports channels) ceased transmission on Now TV Hong Kong. The network, along with its other sister channels, ceased across the rest of Asia on 30 September 2021 as Disney focused on direct consumer streaming via Disney+.

=== Closing in the United States ===
Notice of the discontinuation of the American iteration of Fox Life was sent to cable providers by Disney Media and Entertainment Distribution in late December 2021; the channel would be discontinued on 1 April 2022.

== Fox Life around the world ==
Channel	Country or region	Formerly	Launch year	Replacement / rebrand	Shutdown / rebrand date
Fox Life (Italy)	Italy		13 May 2004	discontinued	1 July 2020
Fox Life (Portugal)	Portugal		19 May 2005	Star Life (international)|Star Life	7 February 2024
Fox Life (Latin America)	Latin America		1 July 2005	Star Life (international)|Star Life	22 February 2021 (as Fox Life); 1 April 2022 (as Star Life)
Fox Life (Bulgaria)	Bulgaria		8 September 2005	Star Life (international)|Star Life	1 October 2023
Fox Life (France)	France		5 October 2005	discontinued	31 December 2009
Fox Life (Japan)	Japan		14 December 2005	Fox Sports	30 September 2011
Fox Life (Turkey)	Turkey		13 November 2006	discontinued	1 January 2021
Fox Life (Poland)	Poland		1 January 2007	Fox Comedy	16 January 2015
Fox Life Adria	Balkans		9 November 2007	Star Life	1 October 2023
Fox Life (Russia)	Baltics and CIS		14 April 2008 (Russia, Baltics and CIS); 5 November 2008 (Estonia)	САПФИР (Russia); FX Life (Baltics and CIS)	1 October 2022 (Russia and Belarus); 24 January 2024 (Baltics and CIS)
Fox Life (Greece)	Greece		1 December 2008	FX Life	15 March 2023
Fox Life (Netherlands and Flanders)	Netherlands and Flanders		7 September 2009	Fox (Flanders); 24Kitchen (Netherlands)	22 September 2015 (Flanders); 31 December 2016 (Netherlands)
Fox Life (United States)	United States		4 November 2013	discontinued	1 April 2022
Fox Life (Korea)	South Korea		1 March 2008	CH.ever	31 December 2020
Fox Life (India)	India	Fox Traveller	15 June 2014	Star Life	13 April 2024
Fox Life (Spain)	Spain	Fox Crime	1 October 2014	discontuined	31 December 2021
Fox Life (Africa)	Africa	Fox Crime	3 October 2016	discontuined	30 September 2020
Fox Life (Middle East)	Middle East		28 September 2017	Star Life	1 March 2024
Fox Life (Southeast Asia and Hong Kong)	Southeast Asia and Hong Kong	Star World	1 October 2017	discontuined	1 October 2021

== See also ==
- Fox Life Greece
- Fox Life Italy
- Fox Life India
