= National Geographic Asia =

Television channel based in Asia

- Broadcast area: Southeast Asia; Hong Kong; Taiwan; Japan; South Korea; Mongolia
- Headquarters: Hong Kong

Programming
- Languages: English; Chinese (Mandarin/Cantonese; dubbing/subtitles); Japanese (dubbing/subtitles); Korean (dubbing/subtitles); Indonesian (dubbing/subtitles); Malay (dubbing/subtitles); Filipino (dubbing/subtitles); Thai (dubbing/subtitles); Vietnamese (subtitles)
- Picture format: 1080i HDTV

Ownership
- Owner: NGC Network Asia, LLC (The Walt Disney Company)
- Sister channels: Nat Geo Wild

History
- Launched: January 1, 1994; 32 years ago (Asia); September 1, 2002; 24 years ago (Japan)
- Closed: January 1, 2022; 4 years ago (SD feed, Vietnam) September 30, 2023; 2 years ago (SD feed, South Korea) October 1, 2023; 2 years ago (Southeast Asia, Hong Kong, and CHT MOD in Taiwan feed) January 1, 2024; 2 years ago (Cable feed, Taiwan)
- Replaced by: Techstorm (Unifi TV); Global Trekker (Astro); BBC Lifestyle (Cignal); BBC Earth (Taiwan); Disney+ (Hong Kong, Southeast Asia, Japan, South Korea, and Taiwan)
- Former names: NBC Asia (1994–1998); National Geographic Channel (1998–2016)

Links
- Website: natgeotv.jp

National Geographic Asia, also referred to as Nat Geo Asia, and National Geographic Channel and also commercially abbreviated and trademarked as Nat Geo or Nat Geo TV, and formerly known as NBC Asia, is a pan-Asian subscription television channel owned by Disney Networks Group Asia Pacific (through NGC Network Asia, LLC). The channel featured non-fiction, factual programming involving nature, science, culture and history, produced by the National Geographic Society, just like History and Discovery Channel.

It was launched on January 1, 1994, as NBC Asia. As of 2008, the Asian version of the original US version was available in over 56 million homes. NGC Asia has had six different channels of feeds. The channel closed in 2023–2024 as National Geographic libraries moved to the streaming platform Disney+.

== History ==
=== NBC Asia (1994–1998) ===
On January 1, 1994, the channel was officially launched as NBC Asia. It featured mostly NBC programs as well as the NBC Nightly News, The Tonight Show, Saturday Night Live and Late Night. Like its European counterpart, it could not broadcast United States-produced primetime shows due to rights restrictions. It did, however, also air some NBC Sports output. During weekday evenings, NBC Asia had a regional evening news program. It occasionally simulcast some programs from CNBC Asia and MSNBC.

=== National Geographic Asia (1998–2023) ===
On July 1, 1998, NBC Asia was rebranded as the National Geographic Channel. The NBC programming moved to CNBC Asia.

On February 4, 2008, the Nat Geo Junior programming block of two non-contingent hours, late morning and late afternoon, was launched on the channel. I Didn't Know That, Mad Labs and Wild Detectives were the initial shows on the block.

==== Closure ====
National Geographic and its sister channel Nat Geo Wild have remained on-air until the announcement of the channel closure on October 1, 2023. This announcement led many of the pay TV providers to lose all of the Disney/Fox linear channels, including National Geographic itself. However, the majority of National Geographic's libraries, including their documentary films, have been included on Disney+ content hub as Disney currently owns the partial ownership on National Geographic Global Networks.

Later on, the Taiwan feed closed down on January 1, 2024; with BBC Earth serving as its replacement.

The only feed that hasn't shut down yet is in Japan, as the Japanese feed is currently operated by The Walt Disney Company (Japan) Ltd; both the Middle Eastern and Indian sub-continent feed is yet to be determined, while the earlier territories currently share the feed with the European/African feeds from The Walt Disney Company EMEA.

== Feeds ==
Original National Geographic Channel logo (2005–2016)

- National Geographic India – It was aimed at India and neighbouring countries. The channel was aired in English, Hindi, Tamil, Telugu and Bengali via five different audio tracks.
- National Geographic Middle East – It simulcasts the Asian from 11:00pm to 5:00am Hong Kong time. Arabic subtitles are available as well. Following the discontinuation of the main Asian feed, now the feed is managed by The Walt Disney Company EMEA, which already controls National Geographic channels in the European and African regions.
- National Geographic Japan – includes Japanese subtitles.
- National Geographic Asia – Broadcasts in both English and Cantonese via two audio tracks‚ as well as a Cantonese subtitles tracks. Closed on 1 October 2023.
- National Geographic Taiwan – includes Chinese subtitles. Closed on 1 January 2024.

== See also ==
- National Geographic Channel (disambiguation)
