= List of National Geographic original programming =

The following is a list of television programs currently or formerly broadcast by National Geographic, for either the National Geographic channel, Nat Geo Wild, Nat Geo Kids, or Disney+.

== Current original programming ==
=== Docuseries ===
Title	Subject	Premiere	Seasons	Status
Explorer	Anthropology/Geography/Nature/Science	December 13, 2004 (Note: Previously aired on Nickelodeon, TBS, CNBC, and MSNBC)	12 seasons, 181 episodes	Pending
Lost Treasures of Egypt	Archaeology	July 7, 2019	6 seasons, 43 episodes	Season 7 due to premiere on November 19, 2026
Gordon Ramsay: Uncharted	Food/Travel	July 21, 2019	4 seasons, 29 episodes	Pending
Strangest Things	Archaeology	February 15, 2021	3 seasons, 25 episodes	Pending
Last of the Giants: Wild Fish	Nature	February 14, 2022	3 seasons, 24 episodes	Pending
Lost Treasures of Rome	Archaeology	April 19, 2022	2 season, 13 episodes	Pending
America's National Parks	Nature	August 29, 2022	2 seasons, 10 episodes	Pending
Limitless with Chris Hemsworth (Note: Disney+ series)	Nature	November 16, 2022	2 seasons, 9 episodes	Pending
When Sharks Attack 360	Nature	July 3, 2023	2 seasons, 14 episodes	Pending
Animals Up Close with Bertie Gregory	Nature	September 13, 2023	2 season, 10 episodes	Pending
A Real Bug's Life	Nature	January 24, 2024	2 seasons, 10 episodes	Pending
Destruction Decoded	Architecture	March 6, 2024	2 seasons, 18 episodes	Pending
OceanXplorers	Nature	August 18, 2024	1 season, 6 episodes	Pending
Defending Europe: Resistance Through the Ages	History	September 5, 2024	1 season, 6 episodes	Pending
Animal Genius: Teamwork	Nature	September 8, 2024	1 season, 1 episode	Pending
National Parks: USA	Nature	September 8, 2024	1 season, 5 episodes	Pending
Witches: The Truth Behind the Trials	Supernatural	September 30, 2024	1 season, 6 episodes	Pending
Animals: They're Just Like Us!	Nature	March 21, 2025	1 season, 6 episodes	Pending
Life or Death: The Negotiators	Negotiations	April 23, 2025	1 season, 4 episodes	Pending
Missing Presumed Dead	Smuggling/Mystery	May 23, 2025	1 season, 10 episodes	Pending
Underdogs	Nature	June 15, 2025	1 season, 5 episodes	Pending
Planet Weird	Nature	June 20, 2025	1 season, 6 episodes	Pending
Deep Dive: North America (Note: Nat Geo Wild series)	Nature	August 2, 2025	1 season, 6 episodes	Pending
Naming the Dead	Genetics/True crime	August 2, 2025	1 season, 6 episodes	Pending
India's Mega Festivals	Culture	September 6, 2025	1 season, 6 episodes	Pending
Engineering Europe	Architecture/Engineering	September 7, 2025	1 season, 6 episodes	Pending
Lost Treasures of Ancient Civilizations	Archaeology	September 25, 2025	1 season, 7 episodes	Pending
Top Guns: The Next Generation	Military	September 25, 2025	1 season, 6 episodes	Pending
Gladiators: Warriors of the Ancient World	History	October 24, 2025	1 season, 4 episodes	Pending
Deep Dive: Australia	Nature	November 16, 2025	1 season, 3 episodes	Pending
Toronto Airport Uncovered	History	November 22, 2025	1 season, 6 episodes	Pending
Pole to Pole with Will Smith	Nature	January 13, 2026	1 season, 7 episodes	Pending
Hidden Beneath the Cities	History/Archaeology/Architecture/Engineering	April 29, 2026	1 season, 10 episodes	Pending
Megastorm	Natural disasters	October 13, 2026	1 season, 8 episodes	Season 1 ongoing
True Tales of the Mob	Crime	November 4, 2026	1 season, 8 episodes	Season 1 ongoing
Awaiting release
How the Tudors Lost Their Heads	History	November 16, 2026	1 season, 6 episodes	Pending

=== Reality ===
Title	Subject	Premiere	Seasons	Status
To Catch a Smuggler	Nature	8 October 2012	9 seasons, 80 episodes	Pending
Ice Road Rescue	Reality	7 September 2015	10 seasons, 91 episodes	Pending
Secrets of the Zoo: Tampa	Nature	5 January 2020	6 seasons, 52 episodes	Pending
Cesar Millan: Better Human Better Dog	Nature	30 July 2021	5 seasons, 60 episodes	Pending
To Catch a Smuggler: South Pacific	Reality	8 October 2022	13 seasons, 90 episodes	Pending
Super Animals	Nature	19 August 2023	3 seasons, 31 episodes	Pending
To Catch a Smuggler: Mediterranean	Reality	22 November 2023	2 seasons, 16 episodes	Pending
Northwoods Survival	Nature	1 October 2024	2 seasons, 15 episodes	Pending
To Catch a Smuggler: Tropical Takedown	Reality	5 October 2024	1 season, 10 episodes	Pending
Incredible Northern Vets	Reality	8 February 2025	2 seasons, 26 episodes	Pending
No Taste Like Home with Antoni Porowski	Food	23 February 2025	1 season, 6 episodes	Pending
Crash Course Cuisine with Hudson Yang	Food	9 March 2025	1 season, 8 episodes	Pending
David Blaine: Do Not Attempt	Culture	23 March 2025	1 season, 6 episodes	Pending
Wildlife Rehab	Nature	29 March 2025	1 season, 6 episodes	Pending
Tucci in Italy	Food/Travel	18 May 2025	2 seasons, 15 episodes	Pending
Inside Airport Lost and Found	Reality	27 September 2025	1 season, 10 episodes	Pending
Amsterdam Central 24/7	Reality	October 1, 2025	2 season, 12 episodes	Pending
Best of the World with Antoni Porowski	Travel	7 June 2026	1 season, 4 episodes	Pending
Surviving Alaska: Women of the Wild	Nature	October 6, 2026	1 season, 8 episodes	Season 1 ongoing

== Upcoming programming ==
=== Docuseries ===
Title	Subject	Premiere	Seasons
Secrets of the Deep	Nature	2027	3 episodes
Hantavirus: The Inside Story	Science	TBA	TBA
Hijacked: The Real Captain Phillips	True crime	TBA	TBA
Home	Nature	TBA	9 episodes
My Brother The Unabomber	True crime	TBA	TBA
Pathological: Chasing A True-Crime Con Man	True crime	TBA	TBA
The Real Finding Nemo	Nature	TBA	TBA
The Real Frozen	Nature	TBA	TBA
Science of Avatar	Science	TBA	TBA
Sentient	Nature	TBA	TBA

=== Reality ===
Title	Subject	Premiere	Seasons
Dance the World with Derek Hough	Dance	TBA	TBA
Legends	Dance reality competition	TBA	1 season, 6 episodes

== Former original programming ==
=== Docuseries ===
Title	Subject	Premiere	Finale	Seasons	Notes
Built for the Kill	Nature	8 December 2001	4 March 2013	5 seasons, 31 episodes	
Taboo	Rituals/Traditions	30 September 2002	17 December 2013	10 seasons, 106 episodes	
Be the Creature	Nature	5 October 2003	14 March 2004	1 season, 13 episodes	
Megastructures	Infrastructure	15 September 2004	17 November 2011	6 seasons, 107 episodes	
Is It Real?	Paranormal	25 April 2005	14 August 2007	2 seasons, 29 episodes	
Ultimate Factories	Manufacturing	9 November 2006	10 November 2013	7 seasons, 82 episodes	
Crash Science	Automobile accidents/Science	6 February 2007	2 May 2007	1 season, 7 episodes	
Monkey Thieves	Nature	12 August 2009	22 June 2011	3 seasons, 39 episodes	
Border Wars	Border control	10 January 2010	16 January 2013	5 seasons, 57 episodes	
Drugs, Inc.	Illegal drug trade	11 July 2010	21 November 2020	7 seasons, 77 episodes	
Fish Warrior	Fishing	26 July 2010	25 March 2011	2 seasons, 6 episodes	
Ancient X-Files	Archaeology/Paranormal	27 September 2010	17 July 2012	2 seasons, 15 episodes	
Alaska Wing Men	Bush pilots	10 January 2011	16 March 2012	2 seasons, 13 episodes	
Beast Hunter	Cryptozoology	4 March 2011	25 March 2011	1 season, 5 episodes	
Animal Fugitives	Nature	4 May 2011	18 May 2011	1 season, 6 episodes	
Man v. Monster	Nature	6 June 2011	25 May 2013	3 seasons, 16 episodes	
Africa's Deadliest	Nature	29 September 2011	15 December 2022	8 seasons, 40 episodes	
Untamed: Americas	Nature	10 June 2012	11 June 2012	1 season, 4 episodes	
Border Security: Canada's Front Line	Border patrol	6 September 2012	28 November 2014	3 seasons, 65 episodes	
Access 360° World Heritage	World Heritage Sites	22 September 2012	15 February 2015	2 seasons, 18 episodes	
When Sharks Attack	Nature	14 July 2013	30 July 2022	8 seasons, 51 episodes	
Inside the Mob: Notorious Bosses	True crime	28 July 2013	10 August 2022	2 seasons, 12 episodes	
Ultimate Airport Dubai	Airport operations	5 September 2013	9 December 2015	3 seasons, 30 episodes	
Animal Fight Night	Nature	6 October 2013	3 June 2018	6 seasons, 37 episodes	
Wild Hawaii	Nature	14 April 2014		1 season, 2 episodes	
Invasion Earth	UFOs	30 September 2014	7 November 2014	1 season, 8 episodes	
Beyond Magic with DMC	Magic	8 November 2014	15 December 2014	1 season, 7 episodes	
Underworld, Inc.	Black market	7 January 2015	28 October 2015	1 season, 13 episodes	
The Big Picture with Kal Penn	Big data/Sociology	30 March 2015	18 May 2015	1 season, 12 episodes	
Danger Decoded	Man-made and natural disasters	11 May 2015	15 June 2015	1 season, 12 episodes	
American Genius	History/Inventions	1 June 2015	22 June 2015	1 season, 8 episodes	
Wild Australia	Nature	7 September 2015	15 September 2015	1 season, 4 episodes	
Breakthrough	Science/Technology	1 November 2015	6 June 2017	2 seasons, 12 episodes	
Wild Yellowstone	Nature	5 December 2015		1 season, 2 episodes	
Primal Survivor	Exploration/Nature	21 January 2016	24 November 2020	2 seasons, 18 episodes	
Party Animals (Note: Nat Geo Kids series)	Nature	4 February 2016	7 January 2018	1 season, 12 episodes	
Wild Sri Lanka	Nature	14 February 2016		1 season, 3 episodes	
The Story of God with Morgan Freeman	Religion	3 April 2016	9 April 2019	3 seasons, 15 episodes	
Nature Boom Time!	Nature	5 April 2016	14 December 2016	1 season, 12 episodes	
Extreme Animal Babies	Docuseries	13 June 2016	17 May 2017	2 seasons, 9 episodes	
Wild Life with Bertie Gregory	Nature	3 August 2016	4 October 2018	2 seasons, 21 episodes	
Facing	Biography	30 August 2016	27 September 2016	1 season, 5 episodes	
Weird but True!	Educational children's television	10 September 2016	14 August 2020	3 seasons, 43 episodes	(Note: Season 3 premiered as a Disney+ Original series)
Savage Kingdom	Reality	25 November 2016	28 August 2020	4 seasons, 22 episodes	
The Adventures of Dr. Buckeye Bottoms	Nature	18 February 2017	26 May 2018	2 seasons, 11 episodes	
Untamed with Filipe DeAndrade	Nature	14 March 2017	30 November 2018	2 seasons, 17 episodes	
Awesome Animals	Nature	13 April 2017	14 June 2017	1 season, 10 episodes	
The World's Deadliest Weather	Meteorology	30 April 2017	12 December 2022	5 seasons, 52 episodes	
Chain of Command	Military	15 January 2018	16 February 2018	1 season, 8 episodes	
Wild Chile	Nature	18 February 2018	4 March 2018	1 season, 3 episodes	
One Strange Rock	Nature	26 March 2018	28 May 2018	1 season, 10 episodes	
Scuba Sam's World	Animated educational television	1 May 2018	5 June 2018	1 season, 6 episodes	
Drain the Oceans	Underwater archaeology	28 May 2018	16 April 2023	6 seasons, 63 episodes	
Wild Russia	Nature	31 May 2018	21 June 2018	1 season, 4 episodes	
Best Job Ever	Exploration/Nature	1 August 2018	6 January 2019	1 season, 16 episodes	
Animal Showdown	Nature	5 September 2018	29 October 2018	1 season, 6 episodes	
Fearless Adventures with Jack Randall	Nature	10 December 2018	29 December 2018	1 season, 4 episodes	
Australia's Most Dangerous	Nature	11 January 2019	6 June 2019	1 season, 12 episodes	
Dead by Dawn	Nature	13 January 2019	17 February 2019	1 season, 6 episodes	
Lost Cities with Albert Lin	Archaeology	20 October 2019	18 November 2019	1 season, 6 episodes	
The World According to Jeff Goldblum	Culture	12 November 2019	19 January 2022	2 seasons, 22 episodes	
Extreme Rescues	Search and rescue	8 March 2020	5 April 2020	1 season, 6 episodes	
Wild Central America	Nature	9 March 2020		1 season, 2 episodes	
Gathering Storm	Weather	26 June 2020	27 July 2020	1 season, 6 episodes	
Rogue Trip	Travel	24 July 2020		1 season, 6 episodes	
Magic of Disney's Animal Kingdom	Theme parks	25 September 2020	4 January 2023	2 seasons, 18 episodes	
Meet the Chimps	Nature	16 October 2020		1 season, 6 episodes	
Trafficked with Mariana van Zeller (Note: Season 4 was re-titled "Trafficked: Underworlds with Mariana van Zeller")	Trafficking	December 2, 2020	September 20, 2025	5 seasons, 51 episodes	
Narco Wars	Drug trafficking/True crime	9 December 2020	7 September 2022	3 seasons, 25 episodes	
Breaking Bobby Bones	Travel	31 May 2021	18 July 2021	1 season, 16 episodes	
America's Funniest Home Videos: Animal Edition	Clip show	11 June 2021	18 July 2022	2 seasons, 24 episodes	
The Hatcher Family Dairy	Farming	11 July 2021	28 August 2021	1 season, 8 episodes	
Shark Attack Files	Nature	12 July 2021	21 July 2022	2 seasons, 14 episodes	
Growing Up Animal	Nature	18 August 2021		1 season, 6 episodes	
Iberia's Woodlands: Life on the Edge	Nature	16 September 2021	23 September 2021	1 season, 2 episodes	
Attack on Pearl Harbor - Minute by Minute	History	30 November 2021	2 December 2021	1 season, 3 episodes	
Welcome to Earth	Nature	8 December 2021		1 season, 6 episodes	
Europe's Hidden Wonders	Nature	2 January 2022	13 February 2022	1 season, 4 episodes	
Something Bit Me!	Nature	27 February 2022	30 October 2022	1 season, 16 episodes	
World of Flavor with Big Moe Cason	Food/Travel	25 July 2022	15 August 2022	1 season, 4 episodes	
Edge of the Unknown with Jimmy Chin	Exploration/Sports	5 September 2022	27 September 2022	1 season, 10 episodes	
Epic Adventures with Bertie Gregory	Nature	8 September 2022		1 season, 5 episodes	
Super/Natural	Nature	21 September 2022		1 season, 6 episodes	
The 7 Toughest Days on Earth	Exploration/Nature	7 February 2023	21 February 2023	1 season, 3 episodes	
UFOs: Investigating the Unknown	UFOs	13 February 2023	27 February 2023	1 season, 5 episodes	
Restaurants at the End of the World	Food/Travel	21 March 2023	11 April 2023	1 season, 4 episodes	
Wild France	Nature	14 April 2023		1 season, 2 episodes	
Lost Beasts: Unearthed	Paleontology	15 April 2023	1 July 2023	1 season, 6 episodes	
Wild Cats of India	Nature	21 April 2023		1 season, 2 episodes	
Drug Lords: The Takedown	True crime	26 April 2023	26 August 2023	1 season, 10 episodes	
Home in the Wild	Exploration/Nature	2 May 2023	9 May 2023	1 season, 4 episodes	
Extraordinary Birder with Christian Cooper	Nature	17 June 2023	22 July 2023	1 season, 6 episodes	(Note: Available to Stream on Disney+)
Never Say Never with Jeff Jenkins	Travel	9 July 2023	27 August 2023	1 season, 8 episodes	(Note: Available to Stream on Disney+)
Farm Dreams	Farming	29 July 2023	26 August 2023	1 season, 6 episodes	(Note: Available to Stream on Disney+)
The Wild Sides	Nature	5 August 2023		1 season, 3 episodes	
Building Impossible with Daniel Ashville	Architecture	17 August 2023		1 season, 5 episodes	
Lost Cities Revealed with Albert Lin	Archaeology/History	4 September 2023	21 December 2023	1 season, 6 episodes	
Incredible Animal Journeys	Nature	19 November 2023	3 December 2023	1 season, 7 episodes	
The Incredible Pol Farm	Farming	6 January 2024	17 February 2024	1 season, 14 episodes	
My Best Friend's An Animal	Nature	17 February 2024		1 season, 6 episodes	
Ancient Bodies: Secrets Revealed	History	18 March 2024	29 April 2024	1 season, 8 episodes	
Pirates: Behind the Legends	History	8 June 2024	29 June 2024	1 season, 8 episodes	
Disaster Autopsy	Man-made and natural disasters	17 August 2024	28 September 2024	1 season, 8 episodes	
Baby Animal Rescue	Reality	15 September 2024		1 season, 1 episode	
Mysterious Islands	Nature	24 October 2024	26 December 2024	1 season, 10 episodes	
Inside the Enchanted Forests	Nature	6 December 2024	20 December 2024	1 season, 6 episodes	
Lost Treasures of the Bible	History	19 December 2024	22 December 2024	1 season, 6 episodes	

=== Reality ===
Title	Genre	Premiere	Finale	Seasons	Notes
Dog Whisperer with Cesar Millan	Reality	13 September 2004	15 September 2012	9 seasons, 162 episodes	
Animal Extractors	Reality	30 October 2006	20 July 2007	1 season, 13 episodes	
DogTown	Reality	4 January 2008	12 March 2010	4 seasons, 28 episodes	
World's Toughest Fixes	Reality	28 September 2008	25 August 2011	3 seasons, 28 episodes	
Alaska State Troopers	Reality	14 October 2009	15 April 2015	8 seasons, 82 episodes	
Flea Man	Reality	17 June 2011	1 July 2011	1 season, 6 episodes	
Doomsday Preppers	Reality	27 June 2011	28 August 2014	4 seasons, 54 episodes	
Brain Games	Reality	9 October 2011	24 February 2020	8 seasons, 67 episodes	
The Incredible Dr. Pol	Reality	29 October 2011	6 July 2024	24 seasons, 290 episodes	
American Weed	Reality	22 February 2012	18 April 2012	1 season, 10 episodes	
Wicked Tuna	Reality	1 April 2012	25 June 2023	13 seasons, 202 episodes	
Amish: Out of Order	Reality	17 April 2012	19 June 2012	1 season, 10 episodes	
American Colony: Meet the Hutterites	Reality	29 May 2012	31 July 2012	1 season, 10 episodes	
Chasing UFOs	Reality	29 June 2012	17 August 2012	1 season, 8 episodes	
America's Lost Treasures	Reality	4 July 2012	5 September 2012	1 season, 10 episodes	
American Gypsies	Reality	17 July 2012	12 September 2012	1 season, 9 episodes	
Abandoned	Reality	22 August 2012	3 October 2012	1 season, 13 episodes	
Cesar Millan's Leader of the Pack	Reality	5 January 2013	26 March 2013	1 season, 12 episodes	
Alpha Dogs	Reality	8 February 2013	12 April 2013	1 season, 16 episodes	
Apocalypse 101	Reality	12 March 2013	2 April 2013	1 season, 5 episodes	
Ultimate Survival Alaska	Reality competition	12 May 2013	22 March 2015	3 seasons, 37 episodes	
Life Below Zero	Reality	19 May 2013	23 February 2025	23 seasons, 258 episodes	
Doomsday Castle	Reality	13 August 2013	1 October 2013	1 season, 8 episodes	
Building Wild	Reality	14 January 2014	21 April 2015	2 seasons, 20 episodes	
Cesar 911	Reality	7 March 2014	16 April 2016	3 seasons, 28 episodes	
Dr. Oakley, Yukon Vet	Reality	12 April 2014	9 December 2023	12 seasons, 125 episodes	
Wicked Tuna: Outer Banks	Reality	17 August 2014	21 November 2021	8 seasons, 102 episodes	
Live Free or Die	Reality	30 September 2014	10 October 2016	3 seasons, 33 episodes	
Dr. K's Exotic Animal ER	Reality	14 October 2014	21 March 2021	9 seasons, 87 episodes	
Yukon River Run	Reality	20 July 2015	7 September 2015	1 season, 8 episodes	
Vet School	Reality	19 September 2015	7 November 2015	1 season, 8 episodes	
Animal Storm Squad	Reality	11 March 2016	8 April 2016	1 season, 5 episodes	
Animal ER	Reality	10 September 2016	7 October 2017	2 seasons, 18 episodes	
To Catch a Smuggler: Colombia	Reality	7 June 2016	5 December 2018	2 seasons, 18 episodes	
Rocky Mountain Animal Rescue	Reality	3 March 2018	7 April 2018	1 season, 6 episodes	
Secrets of the Zoo	Reality	29 July 2018	3 July 2022	5 seasons, 44 episodes	
Sam's Zookeeper Challenge	Reality	12 November 2018	3 December 2018	1 season, 4 episodes	
To Catch a Smuggler: Madrid	Reality	22 March 2019	4 January 2022	2 seasons, 12 episodes	
Dog: Impossible	Reality	1 September 2019	29 August 2021	2 seasons, 14 episodes	
To Catch a Smuggler: Brazil	Reality	3 October 2019	24 October 2019	1 season, 4 episodes	
Running Wild with Bear Grylls (seasons 5–8)	Reality	5 November 2019	27 August 2023	4 seasons, 32 episodes	(Note: Seasons 1–4 originally aired on NBC)
Malawi Wildlife Rescue	Reality	8 December 2019	7 May 2022	2 seasons, 12 episodes	
Secrets of the Zoo: The Wild Side	Reality	8 December 2019	6 March 2022	2 seasons, 6 episodes	
Heartland Docs, DVM	Reality	25 January 2020	23 December 2023	5 seasons, 52 episodes	
Secrets of the Zoo: Down Under	Reality	1 March 2020	4 September 2022	3 seasons, 44 episodes	
Critter Fixers: Country Vets	Reality	7 March 2020	1 June 2024	6 seasons, 62 episodes	
Life Below Zero: Northern Territories	Reality	17 March 2020	10 May 2022	2 seasons, 16 episodes	
To Catch a Smuggler: Peru/Brazil	Reality	7 May 2020	29 October 2020	1 season, 8 episodes	
United Vets of America	Reality	30 August 2020	17 December 2020	1 season, 6 episodes	
Life Below Zero: Next Generation	Reality	7 September 2020	28 February 2024	7 seasons, 90 episodes	
Secrets of the Zoo: North Carolina	Reality	31 October 2020	19 December 2020	1 season, 8 episodes	
Heartland Docs, DVM: Family Values	Reality	5 March 2021	23 July 2022	2 seasons, 20 episodes	
Race to the Center of the Earth	Reality competition	29 March 2021	10 May 2021	1 season, 7 episodes	
To Catch a Smuggler: Rome	Reality	9 April 2021	30 April 2021	1 season, 8 episodes	
Called to the Wild	Reality competition	7 December 2021	21 December 2021	1 season, 6 episodes	
Brain Games: On the Road	Reality competition	25 February 2022	18 March 2022	1 season, 20 episodes	
Life Below Zero: First Alaskans	Reality	30 May 2022	17 April 2024	3 seasons, 42 episodes	
Wildlife Rescue Australia	Nature	11 June 2022	27 August 2022	1 season, 10 episodes	
To Catch a Smuggler: Caribbean Coast	Reality	21 September 2022	23 September 2023	2 seasons, 14 episodes	
Going Fur Gold	Reality	7 January 2023	30 January 2023	1 season, 6 episodes	
Fiennes: Return to the Wild	Reality	28 May 2024		1 season, 2 episodes	

=== Drama ===
Title	Genre	Premiere	Finale	Seasons	Notes
Genius	Biopic anthology	25 April 2017	22 February 2024	4 seasons, 36 episodes	
Mars	Science fiction drama	14 November 2016	17 December 2018	2 seasons, 13 episodes	
The Long Road Home	Military drama	7 November 2017	19 December 2017	8 episodes	(Note: Miniseries)
Valley of the Boom	Historical docudrama	13 January 2019	27 January 2019	6 episodes	
The Hot Zone	Drama	27 May 2019	30 November 2021	2 seasons, 12 episodes	
The Right Stuff	Historical drama	9 October 2020	20 November 2020	8 episodes	
Barkskins	Historical drama	25 May 2020	15 June 2020	1 season, 8 episodes	
A Small Light	Biographical drama	1 May 2023	22 May 2023	6 episodes	

=== Variety ===
Title	Genre	Premiere	Finale	Seasons	Notes
Duck Quacks Don't Echo	Comedy panel game show	13 January 2014	3 March 2014	1 season, 14 episodes	
StarTalk with Neil DeGrasse Tyson	Talk show	20 April 2015	16 May 2019	5 seasons, 76 episodes	
Earth Moods	Short-form visual	16 April 2021		1 season, 5 episodes	

=== Miniseries ===
Title	Subject	Premiere	Finale	Seasons	Notes
Inside 9/11	History	21 August 2005	22 August 2005	3 episodes	
Amazing Planet	Nature	13 February 2007	21 February 2007	3 episodes	
Brilliant Beasts	Nature	1 April 2008	9 May 2008	5 episodes	
A Traveler's Guide to the Planets	Astronomy	14 February 2010	16 February 2010	6 episodes	
Great Migrations	Nature	7 November 2010	20 November 2010	7 episodes	
Animal Mega Moves	Nature	4 January 2011	25 January 2011	4 episodes	
Alien Deep with Bob Ballard	Natural history	16 September 2012	17 September 2012	5 episodes	
Going Ape	Nature	13 May 2013		3 episodes	
The '80s: The Decade That Made Us	History/Pop culture	14 April 2013	8 May 2013	10 episodes	
Wild Hawaii	Nature	19 January 2014	13 July 2018	3 episodes	
Cosmos: A Spacetime Odyssey	Science	9 March 2014	8 June 2014	13 episodes	(Note: Simulcast on Fox Channel)
The '90s: The Last Great Decade?	History/Pop culture	6 July 2014	28 November 2014	9 episodes	
Eat: The Story of Food	Food	21 November 2014	23 November 2014	6 episodes	
Kingdom of the North	Nature	5 April 2015	6 April 2015	4 episodes	
The 2000s: The Decade We Saw It All	History/Pop culture	12 July 2015	27 November 2015	6 episodes	
Deadly Instincts	Nature	11 October 2015	14 November 2015	6 episodes	
Badlands, Texas	True crime	24 November 2015	12 January 2016	8 episodes	
America's National Parks	Nature	6 December 2015	24 August 2016	6 episodes	
Mission Critical	Nature photography	31 January 2016	22 May 2016	3 episodes	
India's Lost Worlds	Culture/Nature	6 May 2016	20 May 2016	3 episodes	
Continent 7: Antarctica	Exploration/Nature	15 November 2016	20 December 2016	6 episodes	
Origins: The Journey of Humankind	Natural history	6 March 2017	1 May 2017	8 episodes	
Love & Vets	Veterinary medicine	11 March 2017	25 March 2017	3 episodes	
Parched	Ecology	21 March 2017	4 April 2017	3 episodes	
Year Million	Futures studies	15 May 2017	21 June 2017	6 episodes	
American High School	High school	26 September 2017	17 October 2017	4 episodes	
The Story of Us with Morgan Freeman	Anthropology	11 October 2017	20 November 2017	6 episodes	
Inside the SS	History	10 December 2017	10 April 2018	3 episodes	
Trackers	Tracking	20 January 2018	3 February 2018	3 episodes	
America's Wild Frontier	Nature	2 March 2018	30 March 2018	5 episodes	
America Inside Out with Katie Couric	American culture/Politics	11 April 2018	16 May 2018	6 episodes	
Alaska's Deadliest	Nature	12 April 2018	27 April 2018	5 episodes	
Animal PD	Law enforcement	14 April 2018	28 April 2018	3 episodes	
Hitler Youth	History	17 April 2018		2 episodes	
Alaska's Grizzly Gauntlet	Exploration/Nature	27 April 2018	25 May 2018	5 episodes	
The '80s Greatest	History/Pop culture	13 August 2018	10 September 2018	10 episodes	
The '90s Greatest	History/Pop culture	10 September 2018	24 September 2018	10 episodes	
Inside North Korea's Dynasty	History/International affairs	11 November 2018	18 November 2018	4 episodes	
Africa's Wild Side	Nature	3 December 2018	17 December 2018	3 episodes	
Primal Survivor: China	Exploration/Nature	19 December 2018	2 January 2019	3 episodes	
Destination Wild: Wild Arctic	Nature	23 December 2018		3 episodes	
Lost Treasures of the Maya	Archaeology	4 March 2019	25 March 2019	4 episodes	
Buried Secrets of the Bible with Albert Lin	Archaeology	11 March 2019	18 March 2019	2 episodes	
Animal ER Live	Reality	30 March 2019	21 April 2019	8 episodes	
Hostile Planet	Nature	1 April 2019	6 May 2019	6 episodes	
Superstructures: Engineering Marvels	Architecture/Engineering	16 April 2019	2 June 2019	6 episodes	
1989: The Year That Made Us	History/Pop culture	5 May 2019		6 episodes	
Out There with Jack Randall	Nature	7 July 2019	16 August 2019	6 episodes	
Wild Nordic	Nature	25 August 2019	22 September 2019	5 episodes	
Kingdom of the White Wolf	Nature	25 August 2019		3 episodes	
Buried Secrets of WWII	History	2 September 2019	7 October 2019	6 episodes	
Activate: The Global Citizen Movement	Social justice	5 September 2019	10 October 2019	6 episodes	
Cosmos: Possible Worlds	Science	9 March 2020	20 April 2020	13 episodes	
X-Ray Earth	Natural disasters	5 April 2020	19 April 2020	3 episodes	
Drug Lords: The Next Generation	True crime	29 April 2020	17 June 2020	6 episodes	
Kingdom of the Mummies	Archaeology	12 May 2020	2 June 2020	4 episodes	
City So Real	Local government	29 October 2020		5 episodes	
North Korea: Inside the Mind of a Dictator	Politics	18 January 2021		2 episodes	
Secrets of the Whales	Nature	22 April 2021		5 episodes	
Impact with Gal Gadot (Note: National Geographic YouTube channel series)	Social justice	26 April 2021	31 May 2021	6 episodes	
Unknown Waters with Jeremy Wade	Nature	25 July 2021	8 August 2021	3 episodes	
9/11: One Day in America	History	29 August 2021	1 September 2021	6 episodes	
Storm Rising	Natural disasters	3 October 2021	31 October 2021	5 episodes	
The '80s: Top Ten	History/Pop culture	1 January 2022	3 January 2022	6 episodes	
Primal Survivor: Escape the Amazon	Exploration/Nature	26 April 2022	24 May 2022	5 episodes	
America the Beautiful	Nature	4 July 2022		6 episodes	
Most Extreme Sharks	Nature	8 July 2022		4 episodes	
Gordon Ramsay: Uncharted Showdown	Reality competition	25 July 2022	8 August 2022	3 episodes	
Primal Survivor: Mighty Mekong	Exploration/Nature	6 September 2022	11 October 2022	6 episodes	
World War II: Secrets from Above	History	19 September 2022	24 October 2022	6 episodes	
Hitler: The Lost Tapes of the Third Reich	History	10 April 2023	24 April 2023	6 episodes	
Secrets of the Elephants	Nature	21 April 2023	22 April 2023	4 episodes	
The Rise and Fall of the Maya	History	3 July 2023	24 July 2023	4 episodes	
Primal Survivor: Extreme African Safari	Exploration/Nature	25 July 2023	29 August 2023	6 episodes	
Rewind the '90s	History/Pop culture	31 July 2023	28 August 2023	10 episodes	
JFK: One Day in America	History	5 November 2023		3 episodes	
Science Fair: The Series	Education	10 December 2023		3 episodes	
Arctic Ascent with Alex Honnold	Nature/Sports	4 February 2024		3 episodes	
Queens	Nature	4 March 2024	11 March 2024	7 episodes	
Photographer	Photography	18 March 2024	1 April 2024	6 episodes	
Secrets of the Octopus	Nature	21 April 2024		3 episodes	
World Eats Bread	Food	2 June 2024	16 June 2024	3 episodes	
Erased: WW2's Heroes of Color	Military history	3 June 2024	10 June 2024	4 episodes	
Cult Massacre: One Day in Jonestown (Note: Hulu series)	True crime	17 June 2024		3 episodes	
When Sharks Attack...and Why	Nature	6 July 2024		8 episodes	
Wild Vietnam	Nature	17 July 2024		2 episodes	
Cursed Gold: A Shipwreck Scandal	Exploration/True crime	22 August 2024		3 episodes	
Killer Lies: Chasing a True Crime Con Man	True crime	28 August 2024		3 episodes	
The Stanford Experiment: Unlocking the Truth	True crime	14 November 2024		3 episodes	
Tsunami: Race Against Time	Disaster	24 November 2024		4 episodes	
Oklahoma City Bombing: One Day in America	True crime	2 April 2025		3 episodes	
Secrets of the Penguins	Nature	21 April 2025		3 episodes	
Genghis Khan: The Secret History of the Mongols	History	2 May 2025		6 episodes	
Investigation Shark Attack	Nature	2 July 2025		6 episodes	
Super Shark Highway	Nature	6 July 2025		6 episodes	
Hurricane Katrina: Race Against Time	Natural disasters	27 July 2025		5 episodes	
Secrets of the Bees	Nature	March 31, 2026		2 episodes	
Pompeii: Out of Time with Tom Hiddleston	Docu-drama	July 22, 2026		3 episodes	
Lion	Nature	August 19, 2026	August 22, 2026	4 episodes	
9/11 Reunited	History	August 21, 2026		3 episodes	
Chilean Mine Rescue: Race Against Time	History	September 25, 2026	September 27, 2026	3 episodes	
Africa: Earth's Wild Home	Nature	October 2, 2026	October 3, 2026	7 episodes	
Super Scam Me	True crime	October 17, 2026		1 episode	
Expedition: Save Our Seas	Conservation	November 13, 2026		1 episode	
