= American Weed =

Documentary series about cannabis industry

- Narrated by: Jeremy Schwartz
- Country of origin: United States

Original release
- Network: National Geographic
- Release: February 22, 2012

American Weed is a documentary series about Colorado's medical cannabis industry, which premiered on the American television network National Geographic on February 22, 2012.
