= Ancient X-Files =

Ancient X-Files is a series on the National Geographic Channel. Each episode contains one or two mysterious stories of the ancient past. As the show unfolds, it attempts to scientifically investigate legends and myths.

The series premiered on 11 June 2015 in Australia on History Channel.

== Episodes ==
The episodes are sometimes aired in different order.

=== Season 1 ===
No.	Title	Original release date
101	"The Holy Grail and The Minotaur"	TBA
Topics: Holy Grail; Minotaur
102	"Blood of Christ and Mystery Disc"	27 September 2010
Topics: Bloodstains at Sudarium of Oviedo; Phaistos Disc
103	"Philosopher's Stone & The Lost Ark"	TBA
Topics: Philosopher's stone; Ark of the Covenant

=== Season 2 ===
No.	Title	Original release date
201	"Mona Lisa Code & the Bone Chamber"	TBA
Topics: New examinations of the Mona Lisa may reveal hidden numbers and letters; Hypogeum of Ħal-Saflieni
202	"Crown of Thorns & the Living Dead"	TBA
Topics: A thorn said to be from Christ's crucifixion crown; An ancient mass murder in the Andes
203	"Incas Decoded & Viking Sun Stone"	TBA
Topics: A baffling Inca code; A magical crystal allegedly owned by Vikings
204	"Sodom and Gomorrah & Voynich Manuscript"	TBA
Topics: Sodom and Gomorrah; Voynich Manuscript
205	"Holy Shroud & Star God Temple"	TBA
Topics: Hidden letter at Shroud of Turin; A mysterious temple in Peru
206	"Vampire Killers & Green Children Mystery"	TBA
Topics: The oldest suspected vampire; Two alien-like children in an English village
207	"Mayan Underworld"	TBA
Topic: Mayan underworld off the coasts of Mexico and Guatemala.
208	"Great Flood & Scottish Stone Mystery"	TBA
Topics: Great Flood; Strange standing stones in Scotland
209	"Crucifixion Decoded & Bosnian Pyramids"	TBA
Topics: The real place of Jesus's crucifixion; Bosnian pyramids
210	"Mary Magdalene Mystery"	TBA
Topic: Was Mary Magdalene Jesus's wife and the mother of his child?
211	"Joan of Arc Conspiracy & London's New Jerusalem"	TBA
Topics: The possibility that Joan of Arc was not executed (hosted by Mark Crick); Has New Jerusalem been built in London?
212	"Death Cult Temple & Bog Bodies of Ireland"	TBA
Topics: Göbekli Tepe; A series of maimed bodies at a muddy landscape in Ireland
213	"Sword in the Stone & Orpheus Amulet"	TBA
Topics: A medieval sword lodged in a stone at a church in Italy; The so called Orpheus amulet

== See also ==
- Ancient Secrets
