= Remote Survival =

- Genre: Reality competition
- Country of origin: United States
- Original language: English
- No. of seasons: 1
- No. of episodes: 4

Production
- Executive producers: DJ Nurre; Vince Dipersio
- Running time: 60 minutes
- Production company: Eyeworks USA

Original release
- Network: National Geographic Channel
- Release: January 11, 2015 – present

Remote Survival is an American television reality competition series produced by Eyeworks USA Productions that premiered on the National Geographic Channel on January 11, 2015. The series is executive produced by DJ Nurre, and Vince DiPersio.

== Series overview ==
Four episodes document the survivalists' experiences while being guided by the experts, Hodges and Coker. Two of the episodes take place in the coastal rainforest of Washington State, the other two are set in the desert regions of Southern Utah.

== Cast ==
=== Hosts ===
- Cliff Hodges
- Alex Coker

=== Survivors ===
Each episode features two new 'Remote Survivors', or contestants. One is guided by Cliff Hodges, the other by Alex Coker. Contestants must follow the experts' instruction to travel from a drop point to an extraction point of a period of several days (exact length unspecified) while performing various survival skills along the way. Contestants have the option to be evacuated at any time by using an emergency GPS transponder located on their shoulder strap.

Contestant	Season:Episode	Location	Guide	Result
Paul Archer	1:1	Deserts of Utah	Cliff Hodges	Evacuated - Did not finish
Andrew Milich	1:1	Deserts of Utah	Alex Coker	Course Completed Successfully
Anthony Trucks	1:2	Pacific Northwest	Cliff Hodges	Course Completed Successfully
Sarah Tiefenthaler	1:2	Pacific Northwest	Alex Coker	Course Completed Successfully
Jason Back	1:3	Deserts of Utah	Cliff Hodges	Course Completed Successfully
Colby Raines	1:3	Deserts of Utah	Alex Coker	Evacuated - Did not finish
Matthew Farides	1:4	Pacific Northwest	Cliff Hodges	Course Completed Successfully
Michael Barden	1:4	Pacific Northwest	Alex Coker	Course Completed Successfully
