= National Geographic Farsi =

- Country: United Arab Emirates
- Headquarters: Dubai Media City; Dubai, United Arab Emirates

Programming
- Language: Persian
- Picture format: 1080i HDTV (downscaled to 16:9 576i for the SDTV feed)

Ownership
- Owner: National Geographic Society; Fox Networks Group (Walt Disney Direct-to-Consumer & International)

History
- Launched: 15 October 2011 (first iteration); 1 September 2017 (second iteration)
- Closed: 1 May 2013 (first iteration); 1 January 2020 (second iteration)

Links
- Website: natgeotv.com/farsi

Availability

Terrestrial
- Channel 41

National Geographic Farsi was a free-to-air documentary channel that was originally launched on 15 October 2011, and relaunched on 1 September 2017. It is the official Persian language edition of the National Geographic Channel. The channel broadcast via Eutelsat W3A. The channel features broadcasts of National Geographic's documentary series subtitled in Farsi. Whilst the channel was aimed to broadcast to a Persian-speaking audience in Iran, the channel's broadcast was based in Dubai, U.A.E.

== Relaunch ==
On 28 August 2017, the channel's official Facebook page announced its relaunch to be on 1 September alongside a promotional video. Also the new availability information of the channel on Eutelsat 7 and Hotbird 13 were announced on the same day.
