= United States Lace Curtain Mills =

- U.S. National Register of Historic Places
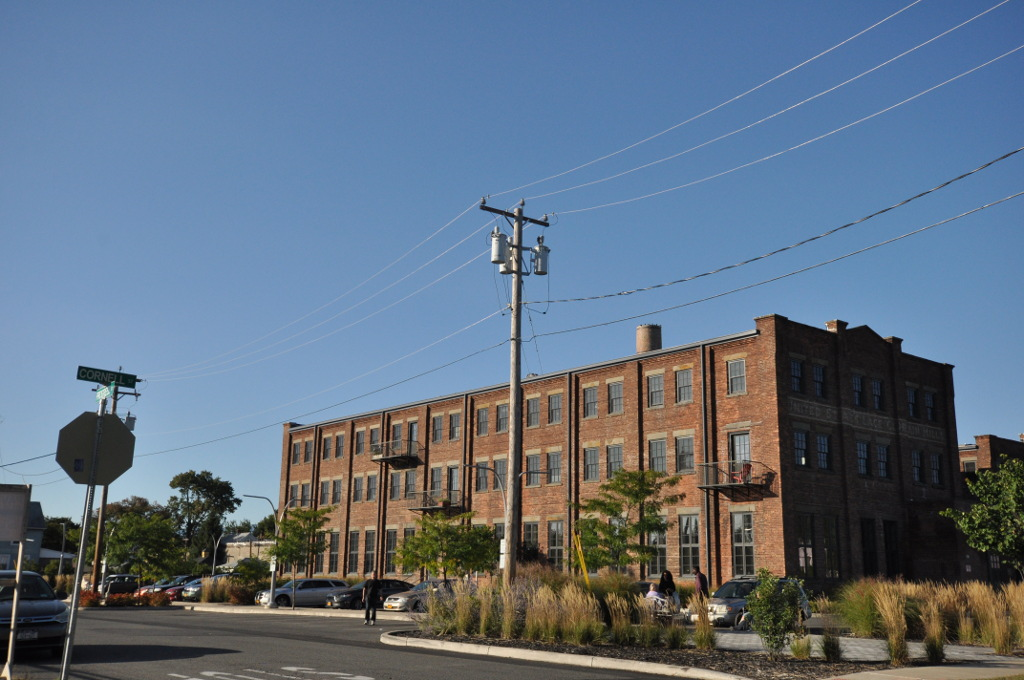

- Location within New York Location within the United States
- Location: 165 Cornell St., Kingston, New York
- Coordinates: 41.93478°N 73.99846°W
- Area: 1.53 acres (0.62 ha)
- Built: c. 1902-1903
- NRHP reference No.: 13000100
- Added to NRHP: March 20, 2013

United States Lace Curtain Mills, also known as the Scranton Lace Company Kingston Mill, is a historic factory building located at Kingston, Ulster County, New York. It was completed about 1903, and is a complex of three parallel brick buildings connected by hyphens. It operated as a textile manufacturing facility until 1951.

It was listed on the National Register of Historic Places in 2013.
