= Scranton Lace Company =

- U.S. National Register of Historic Places
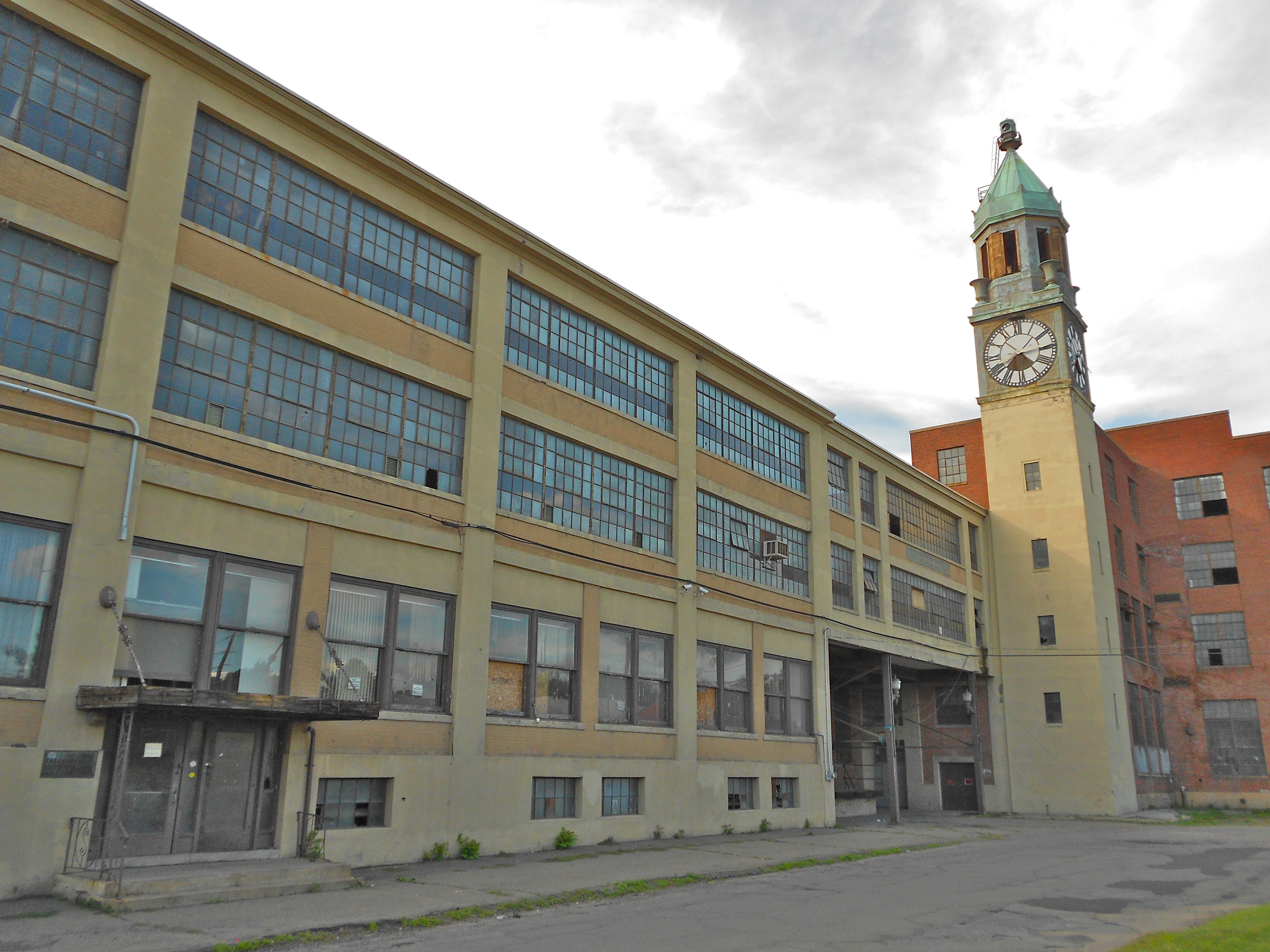

- Location within Pennsylvania Location within the United States
- Location: 1315 Meylert Ave., Scranton, Pennsylvania
- Coordinates: 41°25′36″N 75°39′34″W
- Built: 1891, 1949
- NRHP reference No.: 12000221
- Added to NRHP: April 16, 2012

The Scranton Lace Company, also known as the Scranton Lace Curtain Company and Scranton Lace Curtain Manufacturing Company, was an American lace manufacturer in Scranton, Pennsylvania.

== History ==
The company was established by the Scranton Board of Trade as the Scranton Lace Curtain Manufacturing Company in 1890 and was incorporated on June 15, 1897. The name Scranton Lace Company became standardized in 1916 when the Scranton Lace Curtain Manufacturing Company and one of its subsidiaries combined their operations. On May 13, 1958, the company changed its name to The Scranton Lace Corporation, but soon thereafter reverted to using the name The Scranton Lace Company as its official title. From 1916 to 2002 the company remained the first and largest known producer of Nottingham Lace in the United States.

The company was the world leader in Nottingham lace and also produced tablecloths, napkins, valances, and shower curtains, among many other types of lace items. During the 1940s, the company teamed up with subsidiaries such as Victory Parachutes, Inc. and Sweeney Bros. to manufacture parachutes and camouflage netting. The company prospered well into the 1950s, but risky investments involving Hal Roach Studios and the fledgling television industry placed the company in financial peril and eventually led to its closure in 2002. Despite the factory being one of area's biggest employers, it closed in 2002 with the company's vice president telling its employees, mid-shift, that the facility was closing "effective immediately".

The facility featured a theater, bowling alley, gymnasium, infirmary, clock tower (that is a city landmark and has a Meneely cast iron bell) and other amenities.

On January 31, 2011, the Scranton City Council gave final approval to Lace Building Affiliates to redevelop the Scranton Lace Complex industrial factory located at 1315 Mylert Avenue. Development was stalled because the site had been located within a flood zone before a levee was completed along the Lackawanna River in 2011 and the mapping was not updated until early 2016. Environmental cleanup work is expected to begin in August 2016.

On December 30, 2011, the company's abandoned building was featured in the pilot episode of the Abandoned television series.

The factory complex was added to the National Register of Historic Places in 2012. The Scranton Lace Company Kingston Mill at Kingston, New York was listed in 2013. The corporate records were moved to the Waverly Community House in 2012.

In 2019 several structures within the plant were demolished. The core historic buildings were redeveloped into a mix of residential, retail, and public amenity spaces named Lace Village. The landmark clock tower was re-lighted in December 2023.
