= Ancient Secrets =

Ancient Secrets is a series on the National Geographic Channel. As the show unfolds, it attempts to investigate the world's most enduring – and infamous – structures, legends, and icons.

== Episodes ==
The episodes are aired in different order in different territories.

- Mystery of The Silver Pharaoh
- The Sphinx
- China's Lost Pyramids
- Cathedrals Decoded
- Witch Hunter's Bible
- Secrets of The Parthenon
- The Lost Ship Of Rome
- China's Ghost Army

== See also ==
- Ancient X-Files
