= Animal Fight Night =

Wildlife action TV series

- Also known as: Animal Fight Club
- Genre: Wildlife; Action; Geography
- Created by: Tom Brisley
- Narrated by: Eric Meyers
- Country of origin: United Kingdom
- Original language: English
- No. of seasons: 6
- No. of episodes: 38

Production
- Executive producer: Ashley Hoppin
- Camera setup: Multiple
- Running time: 44 minutes (per episode)
- Production company: Arrow International Media Ltd.

Original release
- Network: Nat Geo Wild (2013–present)
- Release: October 6, 2013 – June 3, 2018

Related
- Savage Kingdom

Animal Fight Night (also known as Animal Fight Club) is an animal wildlife show released by National Geographic. Season 1 premiered on October 6, 2013 on Nat Geo Wild in the United States before airing internationally in December 2013. The series ended in season 6 with 2 episodes airing on June 3, 2018. Afterwards, the show airs outside the U.S. as Animal Fight Club in selected countries such as South Africa and the United Kingdom.

On July 29, 2014, it was announced that season 2 will premiere on August 18 before airing internationally in September 2014.

== Plot ==
The show unveils several recordings of animals fighting each other for survival. Visual effects such as slow motion, time slices, and freeze frames are used throughout the show. A CG blue-world appears between the climax of battles, giving the narrator time to explain the physiological effects of the animals' natural abilities.

== Series overview ==
Season	Episodes	Originally released		
Season	Episodes	First released	Last released	Network
1	3	October 6, 2013		Nat Geo Wild
2	6	August 18, 2014	September 1, 2014	Nat Geo Wild
3	7	July 10, 2015	July 31, 2015	Nat Geo Wild
4	6	November 26, 2016	December 10, 2016	Nat Geo Wild
5	8	April 28, 2017	June 16, 2017	Nat Geo Wild
6	8	January 7, 2018	June 3, 2018	Nat Geo Wild

== Episodes ==
=== Season 1 (2013) ===
No. overall	No. in season	Title	Produced By	Original release date	Prod. code
1	1	"Savanna Smackdown"	Jackie Forster & Lucy Van Beek	October 6, 2013	101
A nomad challenges a male lion to take over his pride, a youngster thinks he's got what it takes to defeat an old male elephant, a desperate hippo picks up a fight after denial to join a river, and an old buffalo fights with his life to defend his position over the herd from being snatched away.
2	2	"Rumble in the USA"	Jackie Forster & Lucy Van Beek	October 6, 2013	102
A bison rages out war against other bison to reserve a female for himself, two rattlesnakes tangle into a headlock fighting each other, a polyergus ant betrays her own kind and claims the throne of another to build a colony of her own, and two grizzly bears wrestle against each other on a rocky river shore.
3	3	"Beach Brawl"	Jackie Forster & Lucy Van Beek	October 6, 2013	103
Hungry for power, a komodo dragon challenges an old timer to claim his position, male elephant seals collide with each other in mutual combat, a group of walrus fight their way onto a beach that's already occupied, and a Tasmanian devil learns table manners the hard way after sneaking into a feast.

=== Season 2 (2014) ===
No. overall	No. in season	Title	Produced By	Original release date	Prod. code
4	1	"Kangaroos, Tigers, Octopus"	Julian Jones & Thomas Viner	August 18, 2014	N/A
Thirsty to rule, a kangaroo picks up a fight with the mob leader, two fierce tigers throw paw punches against each other, an octopus is devoured by another for secretly moving onto private property, and two stalk-eyed flies challenge each other in a duel for breeding rights.
5	2	"Grizzly Bears, Guanacos, Beetles"	Amy Foster & Thomas Viner	August 18, 2014	N/A
Things don't go well when a mother bear strives to catch a fish for her cubs, a wandering guanaco finds and challenges the head honcho to claim his harem of females, and two darwin beetles knock each other face-to-face on a tree trunk.
6	3	"Leopards, Wild Boars, Pistol Shrimp"	Julian Jones & Thomas Viner	August 25, 2014	N/A
Desperate for food, a stray hyena finds herself on enemy ground and pays the price for trespassing, a young leopard fights for his life and learns what to do after tackling prey out in the open, a pistol shrimp uses his pincers against another in one-on-one combat, and two male wild boars engage in warfare to claim the one chance to breed.
7	4	"Coyotes, Crabs, Eagles"	Julian Jones & Thomas Viner	August 25, 2014	N/A
A fight sparks after a coyote sniffs his way onto a meal that's already claimed by another pack, two ghost crabs provoke each other into an unexpected fight, and a young adult eagle tries to maneuver his prey to safety while being attacked by a group of bandits.
8	5	"Warthogs, Hippos, Badgers"	Julian Jones & Thomas Viner	September 1, 2014	N/A
After irritation by wandering piglets, a warthog risks his life defending his leadership from being replaced by a bachelor, a hippo steps up to challenge the dominant male and claim his harem of females, two male oryxes use their horns to skewer each other, and a fight erupts between two mother badgers.
9	6	"Wolverines, Giant Hornets, Koalas"	Julian Jones & Thomas Viner	September 1, 2014	N/A
Weak and now unable to rule, a swarm of giant hornets devour their own queen, a wolverine barges into unwelcome territory and risks a fight for his life, two blackbucks ram their horns into each other, and a koala exits sleep mode to defend his home from being invaded by an intruder.

=== Season 3 (2015) ===
No. overall	No. in season	Title	Produced By	Original release date	Prod. code
10	1	"Brutal Brawls"	Amy Foster & Thomas Viner	July 10, 2015	N/A
Not strong enough to win a fight, a cuttlefish plays the odds to get his desire, a colony of driver ants attempt to raid a termite nest, two alligators lock themselves into an iron grip on a civilian golf course, and an elk picks up a fight with a bison.
11	2	"Turf Wars"	Amy Foster & Thomas Viner	July 10, 2015	N/A
A group of lionesses work together to take down a young giraffe, a mantis shrimp defends himself from becoming sea food, two sand goannas settle their differences in a judo wrestling match, and a dominant capybara faces a new threat to his position.
12	3	"Monster Mayhem"	Amy Foster & Thomas Viner	July 17, 2015	N/A
A pride of lions force themselves to feast in with a float of Nile crocodiles, two red deers strike into each other with their antlers, a jird searching for food bumps into the path of another, and a mother bison struggles to defend her young from hungry predators.
13	4	"Dangerous Encounters"	Amy Foster & Thomas Viner	July 17, 2015	N/A
Rising out of hibernation, a grizzly bear defends his first meal from being scavenged by a pack of wolves, a lemon shark attempts to snatch food away from a saltwater crocodile, a puffin clashes into another in pursuit for his prey, and two male hooded seals slug into each other.
14	5	"Killer Clashes"	Amy Foster & Thomas Viner	July 24, 2015	N/A
A pair of fighting bulls smash into each other for a position in power, a wandering bobcat takes out his claws against a lynx, a giant desert centipede aims to finish off a female grasshopper mouse, and a feeding frenzy erupts between lions and a clan of spotted hyena.
15	6	"Mortal Combat"	Amy Foster & Thomas Viner	July 24, 2015	N/A
A Nile crocodile risks her life by moving into a pod of hippos to catch her prey, a white rhino rages into fury when he finds a herd of buffalo on his turf, a grey mongoose tackles into a spectacled cobra, and two red foxes attack each other.
16	7	"Cat Fight"	Amy Foster & Thomas Viner	July 31, 2015	N/A
Two stray lions seek to hijack a kingdom for themselves, two tigers turn against each other after finding a plot they both want, a leopard tries to protect his meal from a scavenger, and a spotted hyena calls out for backup to interrupt a pride of lions.

=== Season 4 (2016) ===
No. overall	No. in season	Title	Produced By	Original release date	Prod. code
17	1	"Clash of Titans"	Tony Lee & Nick Metcalfe	November 26, 2016	N/A
Two male giraffes swing their necks directly at each other in a standoff, a zebra picks up war with another after he's seen moving toward a female, an African penguin sneaks behind a couple's trail to snatch a mate for himself, and a horned lizard leashes out his secret weapon against a wild coyote.
18	2	"Africa's Deadliest"	Tony Lee & Nick Metcalfe	November 26, 2016	N/A
Things don't go well when a Nile crocodile spots intruders moving onto his property, three young lions see their chance to easily take down a rhino, a female Asian mantis gets into it with a giant hornet, and a scorpion aims to finish off a desert shew.
19	3	"Fangs of Fury"	Tony Lee & Nick Metcalfe	December 3, 2016	N/A
Two angry bull elephants ram their tasks into each other, a leopard sees his chance for an easy prey by cutting into a conflict between two male lechwes, a wallaroo challenges an older male to claim access to dominant privileges, and an ibex defends his territory from invaders.
20	4	"King Slayers"	Tony Lee & Nick Metcalfe	December 3, 2016	N/A
Up a mountain, two bighorn sheep clash their heads into each other, females reject a gelada who manages to overpower their leader, two rhinos collide together in hot dispute for a plot of land, and disaster breaks out between a group of striated caracaras.
21	5	"Power Struggles"	Tony Lee & Nick Metcalfe	December 10, 2016	N/A
A male leopard attempts to rob food from a female, young gorillas gang up together against a silverback for his position, male fur seals tussle into each other in mutual combat, and two male bison taunt each other up into a fight for dominance.
22	6	"Sudden Death"	Tony Lee & Nick Metcalfe	December 10, 2016	N/A
A raging buffalo challenges a herd leader into a duel for his position, a stray lioness causes the loss of another prides prey, two emerged honey bees engage in warfare against each other to become queen, and a possum tumbles into a fight with a skunk after finding a burrow they both want.

=== Season 5 (2017) ===
No. overall	No. in season	Title	Produced By	Original release date	Prod. code
23	1	"Dare or Die"	Tony Lee & Nick Metcalfe	April 28, 2017	N/A
A crocodile makes his move to devour a whole family of otters, a honey badger fights to maneuver his way out from three hungry lions, a young muskoxen challenges an older male for his possessions, and tragedy erupts between two female kingfishers.
24	2	"Plan of Attack"	Tony Lee & Nick Metcalfe	May 5, 2017	N/A
At top speed, a cheetah runs his prey into a river and faces a death threat by Nile crocodiles, a clan of hyenas team up to dethrone a tyrant, a honey badger moves into a monitor lizard's path for his next meal, and three wolves plan to steal food from two Eurasian brown bears.
25	3	"Margin of Terror"	Tony Lee & Nick Metcalfe	May 12, 2017	N/A
A female bengal tiger pays the price for trespassing onto enemy grounds, a wild markhor thinks he's got what it takes to knock-out all challengers, two warthogs engage with each other in task-to-task warfare, and a yellow-throated marten finds his way to consume a half-injured langur monkey.
26	4	"Bone Crushers"	Tony Lee & Nick Metcalfe	May 19, 2017	N/A
A buffalo challenges his herd master for top position in head-to-head combat, a cheetah fights for his life after getting trapped between the teeth of a lioness, a meal's fragrance attracts two water monitors who battle it out while another sees his chance to loot it away, and a wandering serval gets into it with a mole snake.
27	5	"Release the Beast"	Tony Lee & Nick Metcalfe	May 26, 2017	N/A
A float of Nile crocodiles lie in wait to launch their attack before a herd of wildebeest and zebra cross into their path, two female praying mantises turn cannibal against each other, a resident Indian rhino fights to prevent an intruder from moving onto his property, and a gang of gray langur monkeys team up to overpower a dominant male.
28	6	"Winner Takes All"	Tony Lee & Nick Metcalfe	June 2, 2017	N/A
A herd of buffalo pursue revenge after a lioness takes out a young calf, a conspiracy of lemurs run into hostile territory, a rough-skinned newt executes his attack after getting swallowed whole by a bullfrog, and a tarantula hawk barges down into a burrow to take on a baboon spider.
29	7	"Rampage!"	Tony Lee & Nick Metcalfe	June 9, 2017	N/A
Three lions make certain a wandering Nile crocodile doesn't interfere with their feast, two brown bears size each other up into a duel, a colony of driver ants invade a colony of army ants in jaw-to-jaw warfare, and grey kangaroos jab each other up into a brawl on civilian grounds.
30	8	"Total Domination"	Tony Lee & Nick Metcalfe	June 16, 2017	N/A
A grizzly bear collides with a burglar who tries to steal food for himself, three lionesses work together to take down a buffalo, male argali hammer their heads into each other for dominance up hill, and male black grouse pluck each others feathers in a lek contest.

=== Season 6 (2018) ===
No. overall	No. in season	Title	Produced By	Original release date	Prod. code
31	1	"Firepower"	Al Blane & Nick Metcalfe	January 7, 2018	N/A
Two male hippos gouge each other with their sharp canines to claim a stretch of river, two cheetahs outrun a wildebeest for their next kill, a lone mustang disrupts the peace of another herd, and two river otters face an assault from three wild coyotes.
32	2	"Blood Feud"	Al Blane & Nick Metcalfe	January 14, 2018	N/A
Hyenas team up to scavenge prey from a pack of wild dogs, two male leopards dig their claws into each other in a bloody battle for territory, a male gentoo penguin runs in to protect his offspring from becoming bird food, and two male moose bring their antlers into action in a civilian neighborhood.
33	3	"Eat, Prey, Kill"	Al Blane & Nick Metcalfe	January 21, 2018	N/A
The sound of two waterbucks disputing for a river attract a hungry pride of lions, a honey badger unexpectedly runs into a clan of hyenas who turn to him for their next meal, two wandering wolverines duke it out against each other in a battle for nearby food, and a golden eagle dives into two capercaillie roosters settling their differences in a pecking duel.
34	4	"Deadly Under Dogs"	Al Blane & Nick Metcalfe	May 29, 2018	604
Two salt water crocodiles tussle each other like ragdolls, a wild dog faces punishment for hunting down prey on hostile grounds, a warthog fights for her life after getting ambushed by a leopard, and an assassin bug searches for a way to finish off a giant African millipede.
35	5	"Giant Slayers"	Al Blane & Nick Metcalfe	June 2, 2018	605
A Nile crocodile snaps his jaws shut around an elephants trunk, two moose flee to the water in panic from a pack of hungry wolves, an impala buys extra minutes of life from the mouths of wild predators, and two male European crickets contend against each other to impress a female.
36	6	"Enemy Within"	Al Blane & Nick Metcalfe	June 2, 2018	606
Spotting a threat from a distance, a dominant lion moves in to remind another pride member "who's king around here", a young giraffe feels confident enough to challenge a dominant male for his privileges, two brown bears lock their claws onto each other in a duel for hunting grounds, and disaster leaps out of the shadows while two male impalas seek to gore each other with their horns.
37	7	"Cheating Death"	Al Blane & Nick Metcalfe	June 3, 2018	607
A six-year old red kangaroo thinks he's big enough to become the new mob leader, a pride of lions chase to puncture a stray lioness who moves onto their property, a Magellanic penguin gets into beak-to-beak warfare with a squatter who wants all he owns, and two male grey seals sink their teeth into each others flesh to become the new dominant beach master.
38	8	"United We Stand"	Al Blane & Nick Metcalfe	June 3, 2018	608
At the edge of a vertical cliff, a snow leopard dives to grab a bharal for her prey, a clan of spotted hyena wait below for prey to fall straight into their mouths as two leopards battle for it up a tree, an armoured ground cricket launches his secret weapon against a red-billed quelea while attacking her offspring, and a squad of meerkats engage in mortal combat with a team of raiders who want their turf.
