= Flea Man =

- Starring: Jimmy Kaplow
- Country of origin: United States
- Original language: English
- No. of seasons: 1
- No. of episodes: 6

Production
- Production location: United States
- Running time: 23 minutes

Original release
- Network: National Geographic Channel
- Release: June 17 – July 1, 2011

Flea Man is an American reality television series that premiered on National Geographic Channel on June 17, 2011. The show follows, flea market veteran, Jimmy Kaplow as he exercises his shrewd eye and haggling abilities to make a profit at flea markets, yard sales, and antiques fairs.

Jimmy Kaplow appeared on Good Day New York July 22, 2011, to give flea market tips and promote Flea Man.

== Episodes ==
No.	Title	Original release date
1	"Estate Sale Addict"	June 17, 2011
Jimmy Kaplow helps a family from Long Beach raise money for their daughter's tuition.
2	"Big-Bucks Bible"	June 17, 2011
The art of haggling is taught at a flea market in Columbus, N.J.
3	"Batman's Basement"	June 24, 2011
Jimmy helps a toy collector sell some of his prize possessions
4	"Antique Gold Mine"	June 24, 2011
An aspiring country singer needs to sell his most valuable collectibles.
5	"Rock & Roll Riches"	July 16, 2011
Jimmy travels to Texas to help a pair of business partners raise money to start a consignment business.
6	"Junk in the Trunk"	July 16, 2011
Alameda Point Antiques Faire near San Francisco.
