= American Genius =

American documentary series

- Genre: History; Inventions
- Narrated by: Jeff Wilburn
- Country of origin: United States
- Original language: English
- No. of seasons: 1
- No. of episodes: 8

Production
- Running time: 40–45 minutes
- Production company: Stephen David Entertainment

Original release
- Network: National Geographic Channel
- Release: June 1 – June 22, 2015

American Genius is an American documentary series focusing on the lives of inventors and pioneers who have been responsible for major developments in their areas of expertise and helped shape the course of history. Consisting of eight episodes, it was telecast on the National Geographic Channel from June 1, 2015 to June 22, 2015. Through re-enactments, each episode focuses on the lives of two individuals (or groups) competing with each other in the same field of expertise, illustrating how some of the greatest inventions were made possible by competition between aspirants. Segments of the episodes also consist of interviews by historians and experts in the specific domain under discussion. Apple Inc.'s co-founder Steve Wozniak gave his perspective and thoughts on the episode 'Jobs vs Gates' to several media outlets before the series premiere.

== Episodes ==
No.	Title	Area of expertise	Original release date
1	"Jobs vs Gates"	Personal computer	1 June 2015
2	"Wright Brothers vs Curtiss"	Aircraft	1 June 2015
3	"Farnsworth vs Sarnoff"	Television	8 June 2015
4	"Hearst vs Pulitzer"	Newspaper	8 June 2015
5	"Space Race"	Space travel	15 June 2015
6	"Colt vs Wesson"	Gun	15 June 2015
7	"Oppenheimer vs Heisenberg"	Nuclear power	22 June 2015
8	"Edison vs Tesla"	Electricity	22 June 2015

== Reception ==
The series received favorable reviews from critics. Melissa Camacho from the Common Sense Media rated it 4 out of 5 stars while concluding “It will encourage the audience to think about the technology we rely on today a little differently”. While Neil Genzlinger from The New York Times described the expert interviews as interspersing and illuminating, he wrote the word 'versus' in the episode titles were unsuitable as several of the inventors had collaborated to work at some point in their lives.

== See also ==
- List of programs broadcast by National Geographic Channel
- Steve Jobs (film)
- America: The Story of Us
