= Johnsonville Village, Connecticut =

Abandoned ghost town in East Haddam, Connecticut, United States

Coordinates: 41.49068°N 72.466255°W

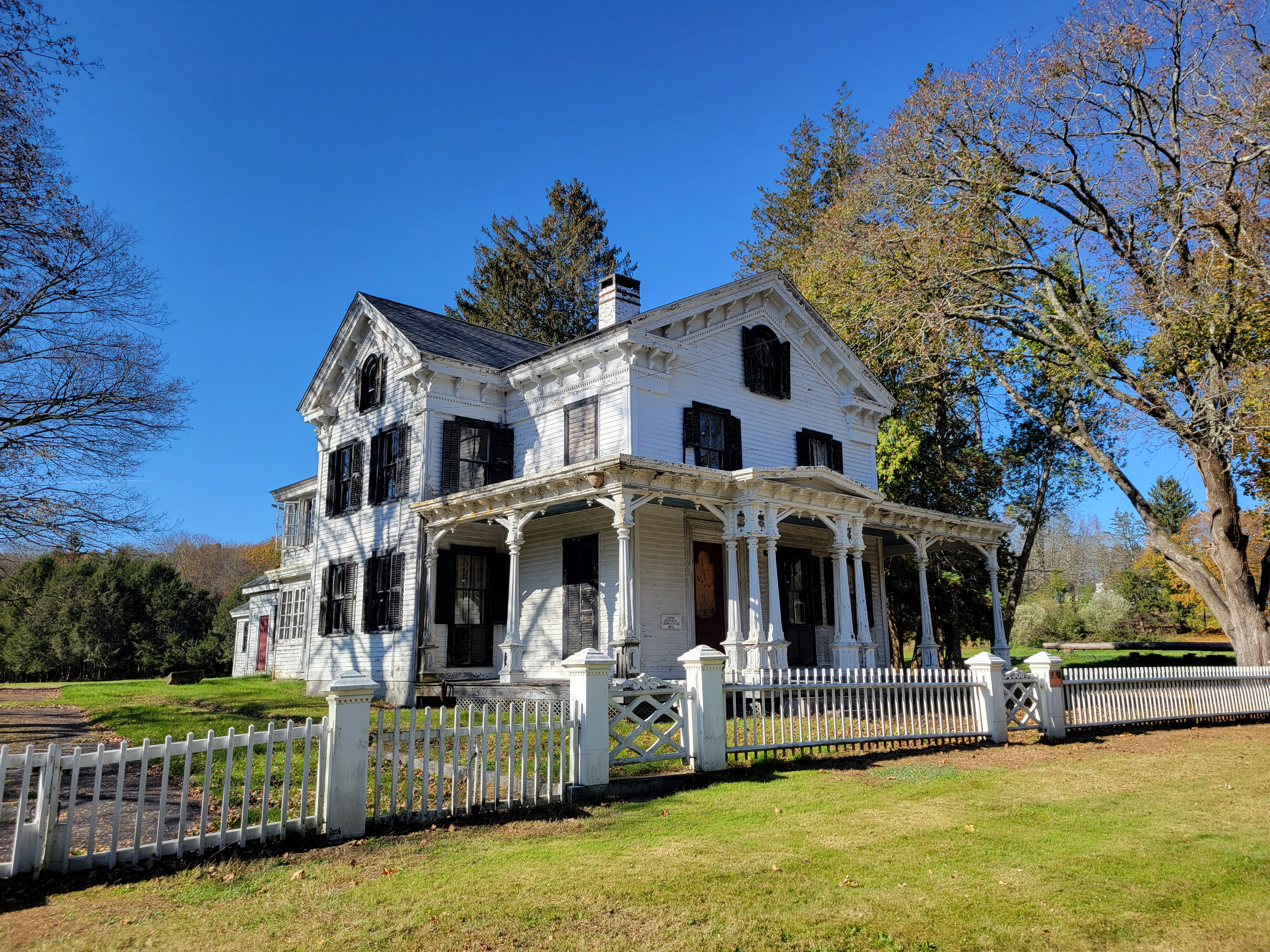
Emory Johnson Homestead

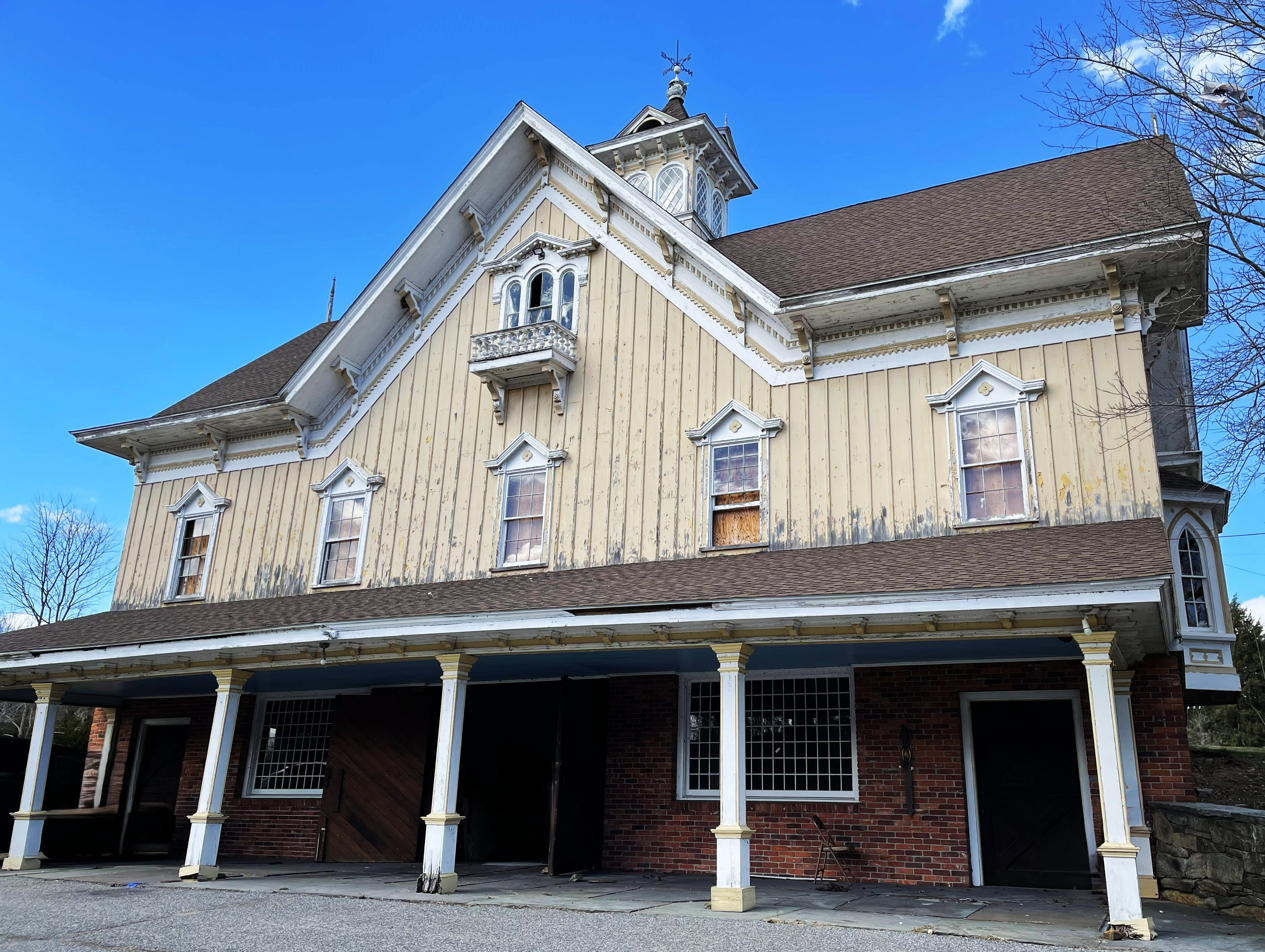
Carriage house

Johnsonville Village is an abandoned ghost town in East Haddam, Connecticut, United States. On July 7, 2017, the property was acquired by the Iglesia ni Cristo, a Christian denomination based in the Philippines.

== Mill community ==
Harnessing power from the abundant water sources of the Moodus and Salmon rivers, the little hamlet became the center of twine production in Connecticut. The twine was primarily used for fishnets, and was sold on both coasts and the Great Lakes.

In 1832, the Neptune Mill was constructed beside a dam just north of the Salmon River Cove. The Card Company, as it was then known also made stocking yarn and carpet warp. New cord wrapping machines filled these mills and twine was produced on a massive scale. Over the years, the Neptune Mill expanded until it reached its 100x100 ft dimensions. Three stories tall, it was a massive edifice, architecturally resembling a church with its steeple and bell that would call workers into the factory each morning.

In 1862, Emory Johnson built the Triton Mill at the northern end of the Millpond; tenements and worker housing soon cropped up in the ensuing years, and Johnsonville was born. The Neptune Mill also came into Johnson's possession in 1867. The Triton Mill was destroyed in a fire in 1924.

One of the jewels of Johnsonville is the Emory Johnson homestead. Built in 1846, the four-bedroom house has three fireplaces, pillared porches, a formal garden and original Victorian-era details.

== Tourist attraction ==
In 1965, Raymond Schmitt, the controversial owner of AGC Corporation, an aerospace equipment manufacturer, bought the Neptune Mill from the Johnson family. He also purchased other vintage buildings and had them moved to Johnsonville, including a Victorian stable and chapel, which hosted weddings.

Nostalgic for the bygone modes of transit of the 19th century, Schmitt brought a sternwheeler to Johnsonville in 1966. For many years, the boat was reported to be "The American" from the Freedomland U.S.A. theme park (1960-1964) in New York City. This has proven to be an error. Research by Freedomland historians discovered that the boat was the twin sternwheeler from Freedomland known as "The Canadian." Connecticut newspaper articles include pictures of "The Canadian" on the millpond. Schmitt bought it at auction and had it towed up the Connecticut River and then carried by truck to Moodus, where it would sit in the Johnson Millpond for more than thirty years. In 1972, the Neptune Mill was struck by lightning and burned to the ground.

In 1993, Billy Joel filmed part of his "River of Dreams" music video at the village.

== Ghost town ==
In 1994, Schmitt got into a disagreement with local zoning officials and shut down the attraction, putting the property up for sale. Schmitt died in 1998, and his estate started selling off many of the antiques and other pieces of the property, including some of the buildings. Some suggest that the ghost of Schmitt roams the grounds of Johnsonville.

A hotel developer, MJABC LLC, bought the 64-acre property in 2001. In 2004, MJABC filed plans for a mixed-use development on the site that included 133 upscale, single-family houses and townhouses, all built in Victorian style and with an age restriction for owners, and for keeping and restoring most of the original dozen or so buildings. That proposal fell apart, however, because the housing component was deemed too high-density. As of October 2014, MJABC LLC still owned the property and continued to pay taxes on it. As of April 2013, Chozick Realty, Inc. of Hartford had listed the village for just under $3 million.

The village, which has now fallen into disrepair, was featured in an episode of the National Geographic TV series Abandoned. The village went up for sale at an online auction on 28 October 2014. The winning bid was US$1.9 million on October 30, 2014, but the deal fell through. On July 7, 2017, the Philippine-based church, Iglesia ni Cristo bought the village for $1.85 million.

== See also ==
- Scenic, South Dakota, another abandoned community purchased by the Iglesia ni Cristo
