= Jeremy Schwartz =

English businessman

- Born: Jeremy Schwartz; 1963 (age 62–63); Crouch End, London, England
- Education: University of Sheffield (BSc); University of Cambridge (PgDip)
- Occupations: Business executive, author, speaker
- Years active: 1988–present
- Board member of: Against Malaria Foundation (trustee, 2005–present)
- Children: 3
- Website: jeremy-schwartz.com

Jeremy Schwartz (born 1963) is a British business executive and speaker who served as the chief executive officer (CEO) of the cosmetics retailer The Body Shop from 2013 to 2017 before it was sold by parent company L’Oréal for underperformance. Later, he worked for 8 months the Danish jewelry company Pandora. In 2024, Schwartz was sued by The Coca-Cola Company for passing off and trademarks claim.

Since 2018, Schwartz occupies his time as a public speaker. He previously held positions at consumer goods companies such as L'Oréal, The Coca-Cola Company, and Sainsbury's.

== Early life and education ==
Schwartz was born in 1963 and raised in England. He attended the University of Sheffield, where he earned an undergraduate degree in metallurgy and materials science. He later pursued postgraduate studies in advanced production management. Schwartz initially considered a career in the mining industry but later opted to pursue a career in business.

== Career ==
Schwartz began his career as a management consultant at the Boston Consulting Group before transitioning to a role at the French cosmetics company L'Oréal. He progressed within L’Oréal's UK division, becoming its UK marketing director in the late 1990s.

In the early 2000s, Schwartz took on the role at The Coca-Cola Company as marketing director for Europe after roles in North West and Central Europe. In this role, he falsely claimed to have invented Coca-Cola Zero. In September 2024, The Coca-Cola Company filed an intellectual property lawsuit against Schwartz, notably for passing off and trademarks claim.

He subsequently joined the British grocery retailer Sainsbury's as brand director. Schwartz participated in the introduction of advertising campaigns such as Action Kids and "Try Something New Today," featuring chef Jamie Oliver.

In 2005, Schwartz left Sainsbury's to lead a food venture, Glorious Foods, with chef Marco Pierre White. In 2009, he was appointed chief marketing officer and commercial director at the media conglomerate News International.

In 2010, Schwartz rejoined L'Oréal as a general manager. In 2013, L’Oréal appointed him chairman and CEO of its subsidiary, The Body Shop. As CEO, Schwartz was tasked with revitalizing the brand. In 2016, his leadership team launched a sustainability strategy titled “Enrich Not Exploit,” which set public targets for renewable energy use, fair trade sourcing, and habitat protection. During this period, The Body Shop performed below expectations and was subsequently sold by parent company L’Oréal.

In 2018, Schwartz worked at Pandora A/S, based in Copenhagen. Following the resignation of Pandora's CEO, Schwartz and CFO Anders Boyer led the company on an interim basis. Schwartz left after 8 months.

Since 2019, Schwartz has held non-executive and advisory roles. In 2021, he was appointed non-executive chairman of Kantar’s Sustainable Transformation Practice, a consultancy that assists businesses with environmental and social sustainability initiatives. He also serves as an adviser to McKinsey & Company's business transformation practice.

== Personal life ==
Schwartz is married with three sons and resides in Surrey, England. He participates in expeditions each year including cycling across Tibet and climbing high altitude mountains. He is a founding trustee and board member of the Against Malaria Foundation, a charity that provides insecticide-treated nets to prevent malaria in developing nations, a position he has held since 2005.
