= Access 360° World Heritage =

- Also known as: Panasonic Presents: Access 360° World Heritage
- Starring: Various hosts
- Country of origin: United States
- Original language: English
- No. of seasons: 4

Production
- Running time: 60 minutes

Original release
- Network: National Geographic Channel
- Release: 2012 – 2014

Panasonic Presents: Access 360° World Heritage is a television show produced by the National Geographic Channel that highlights UNESCO World Heritage sites. It broadcasts in 193 countries. Episodes have covered The Great Barrier Reef, ancient castles of Prague, Mount Fuji, and the Everglades, among others.
