= Border Wars (TV series) =

- Genre: Documentary
- Country of origin: United States
- Original language: English
- No. of seasons: 5
- No. of episodes: 56

Production
- Running time: 42 minutes

Original release
- Network: National Geographic Channel
- Release: January 10, 2010 – April 15, 2015

Border Wars is an American documentary television series on the National Geographic Channel. The program follows agents of the U.S. Border Patrol (USBP), U.S. Customs and Border Protection (CBP), Immigration and Customs Enforcement (ICE), and other divisions of the Department of Homeland Security as they investigate and apprehend illegal immigrants, drug smugglers, and other criminals violating immigration laws. The series follows Air Interdiction Agents and Marine Interdiction Agents who patrol along the U.S.-Mexico border, as well as southern Florida and Puerto Rico.

== Episodes ==
=== Series overview ===
Season	Episodes	Originally released	
Season	Episodes	First released	Last released
1	5	January 1, 2010	February 10, 2010
2	17	August 29, 2010	January 31, 2011
3	13	September 4, 2011	November 27, 2011
4	12	July 9, 2012	September 24, 2012
5	9	November 14, 2012	January 16, 2013

=== Season 1 (2010) ===
No. overall	No. in season	Title	Original release date
1	1	"Last Defense"	January 10, 2010
2	2	"City Under Siege"	January 11, 2010
3	3	"Dead Of Night"	January 18, 2010
4	4	"The Front Lines"	January 25, 2010
5	5	"No End In Sight"	February 10, 2010

=== Season 2 (2010–11) ===
No. overall	No. in season	Title	Original release date
6	1	"Death On The Rio Grande"	August 29, 2010
7	2	"Checkpoint Texas"	September 1, 2010
8	3	"Contraband Highway"	September 8, 2010
9	4	"Lost In The River"	September 15, 2010
10	5	"Dirty Money"	September 29, 2010
11	6	"Fog Of War"	October 6, 2010
12	7	"Hidden Narcotics"	October 13, 2010
13	8	"Manhunt"	October 20, 2010
14	9	"Midnight Drug Run"	November 3, 2010
15	10	"3,000 Pound Coke Bust"	November 10, 2010
16	11	"Murder On The Lake"	November 17, 2010
17	12	"Gang Task Force"	December 1, 2010
18	13	"High-Speed Chase"	December 8, 2010
19	14	"Cartel Crackdown"	December 15, 2010
20	15	"Storm Surge"	December 22, 2010
21	16	"Weed Warehouse"	January 5, 2011
22	17	"Super Sunday"	January 31, 2011

=== Season 3 (2011) ===
No. overall	No. in season	Title	Original release date
23	1	"Seize And Destroy"	September 4, 2011
24	2	"Cocaine Sting"	September 4, 2011
25	3	"Marijuana Airdrop"	September 11, 2011
26	4	"Smuggler's Tunnel"	September 18, 2011
27	5	"Drug-Smuggling Grandma"	September 25, 2011
28	6	"Murder Capital"	October 2, 2011
29	7	"Cartel Corridor"	October 16, 2011
30	8	"Contraband Cargo"	October 23, 2011
31	9	"Going Underground"	October 30, 2011
32	10	"River Under Siege"	November 6, 2011
33	11	"Toxic Drug Tanker"	November 13, 2011
34	12	"Million Dollar Stash"	November 20, 2011
35	13	"River Standoff"	November 27, 2011

=== Season 4 (2012) ===
No. overall	No. in season	Title	Original release date
36	1	"Bullets Over the Border"	July 9, 2012
37	2	"Meth Mobile"	July 16, 2012
38	3	"Contraband Corridor"	July 23, 2012
39	4	"Rio Grande Reefer"	July 30, 2012
40	5	"Hidden Tunnel"	August 6, 2012
41	6	"Cartel Cash Stash"	August 13, 2012
42	7	"Fence Jumpers"	August 20, 2012
43	8	"Tunnel Smoke-out"	August 27, 2012
44	9	"Midnight Drug Trap"	September 3, 2012
45	10	"Cocaine Paradise"	September 10, 2012
46	11	"Cocaine Dump Truck"	September 17, 2012
47	12	"Cash in the Tank"	September 24, 2012

=== Season 5 (2012–13) ===
No. overall	No. in season	Title	Original release date
48	1	"Traffic"	November 14, 2012
50	2	"War Games"	November 21, 2012
51	3	"War on the Streets"	November 28, 2012
52	4	"Special Ops"	December 5, 2012
53	5	"Cash and Corruption"	December 12, 2012
54	6	"The War Comes Home"	December 19, 2012
55	7	"Animals on the Frontline"	January 2, 2013
56	8	"Smuggler's Stash"	January 9, 2013
57	9	"24-Hour Watch"	January 16, 2013

== Reception ==
Common Sense Media rated the show 3 out of 5 stars.
