= Ultimate Airport Dubai =

Documentary television series

- Genre: Documentary
- Directed by: John Smithson
- Narrated by: Tom Goodman-Hill
- Original language: English
- No. of seasons: 3
- No. of episodes: 30

Production
- Running time: 60 minutes (inc. adverts)
- Production company: Arrow Media

Original release
- Network: National Geographic Channel
- Release: September 5, 2013 – December 9, 2015

Ultimate Airport Dubai is a documentary television series which airs on international versions of the National Geographic Channel in more than 170 territories, and available in 45 languages. The program was commissioned by National Geographic Channels International and is produced by Arrow Media.

The series is set in Dubai International Airport and follows staff who are employed at the airport and keep the facility operating, including air traffic controllers, customs officials, ground staff and service personnel. Discussions with the airport operators about being allowed to produce the series began in January 2012.

The first season was filmed from September 2012 to February 2013 and consisted of ten episodes. It premiered on September 5, 2013 in selected regions. The series was renewed following strong ratings globally and locally and a ten-episode second season premiered on December 11, 2014. A third ten-episode season was commissioned on June 12, 2015.

== Episodes ==
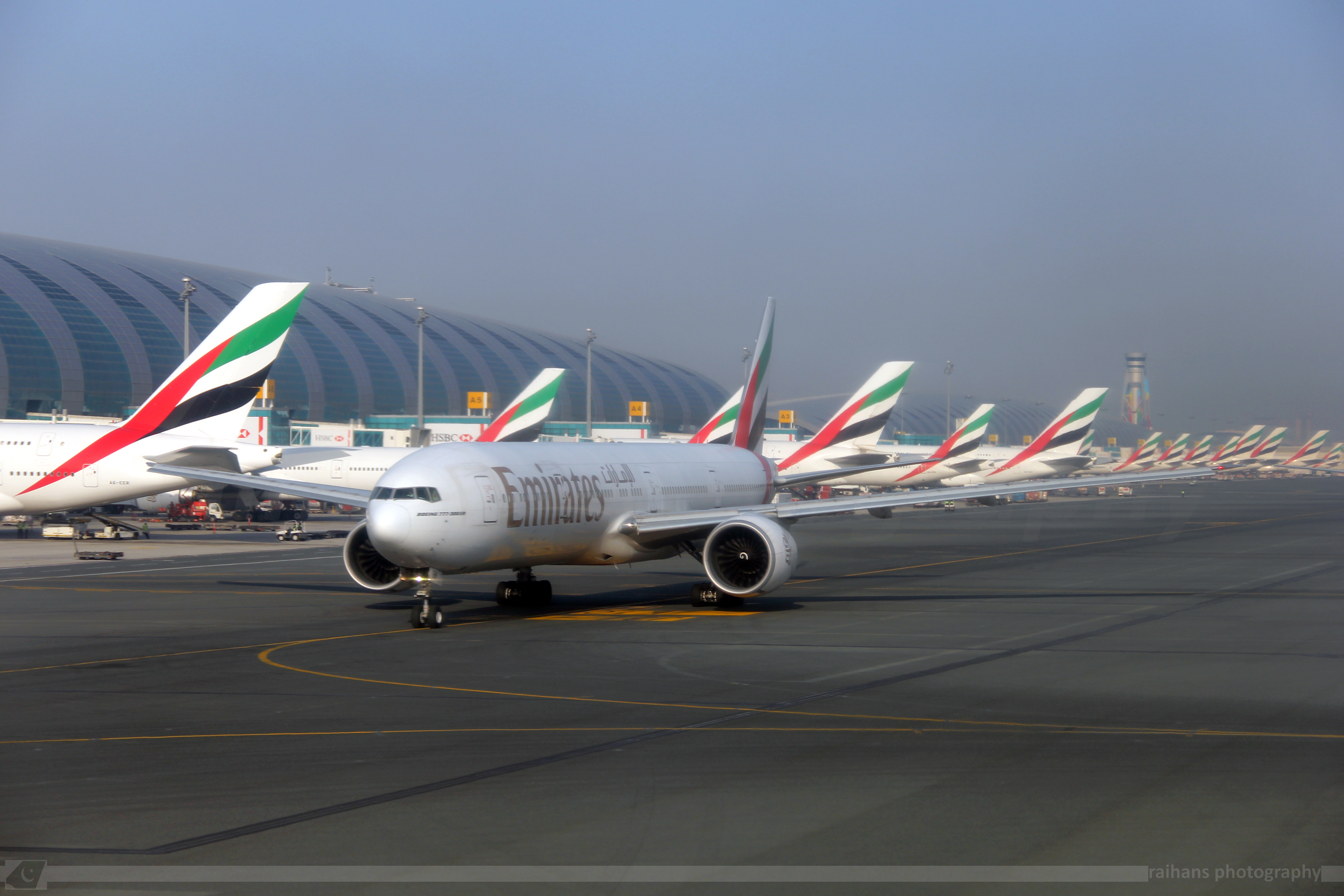
Emirates aircraft at Dubai International Airport, the setting for the program.

Season	Episodes	Originally released	
Season	Episodes	First released	Last released
1	10	September 5, 2013	November 7, 2013
2	10	October 29, 2014	December 24, 2014
3	10	October 7, 2015	December 9, 2015

=== Season 1 (2013) ===
No. overall	No. in season	Title	Original UAE air date
1	1	"Billion Dollar Concourse"	September 5, 2013
2	2	"The Hard Shift"	September 12, 2013
3	3	"Lost Cargo"	September 19, 2013
4	4	"Crystal Customs"	September 26, 2013
5	5	"Domino Effect"	October 3, 2013
6	6	"Stranded"	October 10, 2013
7	7	"Holiday on Delay"	October 17, 2013
8	8	"Missing Passenger"	October 24, 2013
9	9	"Ring the Alarm"	October 31, 2013
10	10	"Dangerous Debris"	November 7, 2013

=== Season 2 (2014) ===
No. overall	No. in season	Title	Original UAE air date
11	1	"Snakes"	October 29, 2014
12	2	"Firefighters"	October 29, 2014
13	3	"Customs Officers"	November 5, 2014
14	4	"Crystal Meth"	November 12, 2014
15	5	"Faulty Planes"	November 19, 2014
16	6	"Airport Emergency"	November 26, 2014
17	7	"A380 Maintenance"	December 3, 2014
18	8	"Cocaine Customs"	December 10, 2014
19	9	"Racehorses"	December 17, 2014
20	10	"Aircraft Makeover"	December 24, 2014

=== Season 3 (2015) ===
No. overall	No. in season	Title	Original Australian air date
21	1	TBA	October 7, 2015
Phil faces an emergency threatening to shut down the airport, Mel is pushed to the limit by two drunk passengers, Hassan catches a smuggler who has swallowed cocaine capsules, concourse construction continues and mechanics prepare for a Boeing 777-200 for take-off.
22	2	TBA	October 14, 2015
Mel deals with 71 angry passengers the fallout of a cancelled flight to Pakistan, Carl carefully deals with incorrectly packed explosives from Germany, Myles tries to keep his multi-billion dollar project on track, and a new system which could revolutionise the airport is trialled.
23	3	TBA	October 21, 2015
A serious engine problem threatens massive delays, an onboard theft has Mel dealing with drama, Hassan catches a passenger attempting to smuggle diamonds in her body and Paul must find a way to get two 9 tonne escalators through a small doorway.
24	4	TBA	October 28, 2015
An emergency call from a passenger has Mel dealing with a worst case scenario, Nizel has a critical decision to make regarding a partially loaded cargo plane, a trainee firefighter attempts to put out a fuel fire and Nizalman tests a refurbished engine.
25	5	TBA	November 4, 2015
George deals with a medical emergency, an Emirates Airbus A380 from Shanghai to Dubai makes an emergency landing at Hyderabad, India due to a medical emergency on board, the ill passenger is safe in Hyderabad and the aircraft is late for about 4 hrs in Dubai, rain leaks into Concourse D threatening a ceiling collapse, two trainee firefighters continue training in a search and rescue exercise, Jo Di Biasi must rush a Chinese tour group from Shanghai which was 4 hrs late due to halt in Hyderabad after a medical emergency onto their connecting flight from Dubai and Lee attempts to fix a lightning damaged aircraft.
26	6	TBA	November 11, 2015
Engineers attempt to recover two bolts from deep inside a Boeing 777 engine, a Chinese family with no cash are forced to find a way to pay an excess baggage fee, Aref inspects a suspect package which may contain illegal drugs, contractors continue work in Concourse D ahead of a boarding gate test, and trainee firefighters must battle a simulated cargo fire.
27	7	TBA	November 18, 2015
Mel faces an angry family who have missed their flight, Leigh and Andy replace a plug in a GE90 engine, Concourse D is filled with smoke as part of a fire test, Leigh must repair a blocked toilet on a Boeing 777, and Gemma must unload a late arriving aircraft full of cargo including 20 tonnes of Valentine's Day flowers.
28	8	TBA	November 25, 2015
A male passenger who possibly has ebola arrives in terminal 3, Leigh must find the source of a strange odour in the cabin of a Boeing 777, Myles prepares Concourse D for an upcoming passenger trial, customs searches a shipment of counterfeit goods and Ian races against time to install decal stickers on an Airbus A380.
29	9	TBA	December 2, 2015
Leigh tries to find the cause of a hydraulic leak, Myles must fix problems in Concourse D before a wayfinding trial can proceed, Karl deals with top priority aid cargo destined for victims of the Nepal earthquake and a man carrying fake passports is stopped at the border.
30	10	TBA	December 9, 2015
A smuggler is caught with 2,000 bottles of forbidden medication, Nizel prepares a shipment of $20 million cash and donated human eyes destined for London, and Dubai Airports owner Sheikh Ahmed bin Saeed Al Maktoum inspects the newly constructed Concourse D.

== Broadcast ==
The series premiered on National Geographic Abu Dhabi and selected international versions of the National Geographic Channel globally on September 5, 2013. The second season premiered in selected markets globally, including the United Kingdom on October 29, 2014 with two episodes airing back-to-back.

In Australia, season 1 premiered on September 17, 2013 on National Geographic Channel Australia. Season 2 premiered on December 7, 2014.

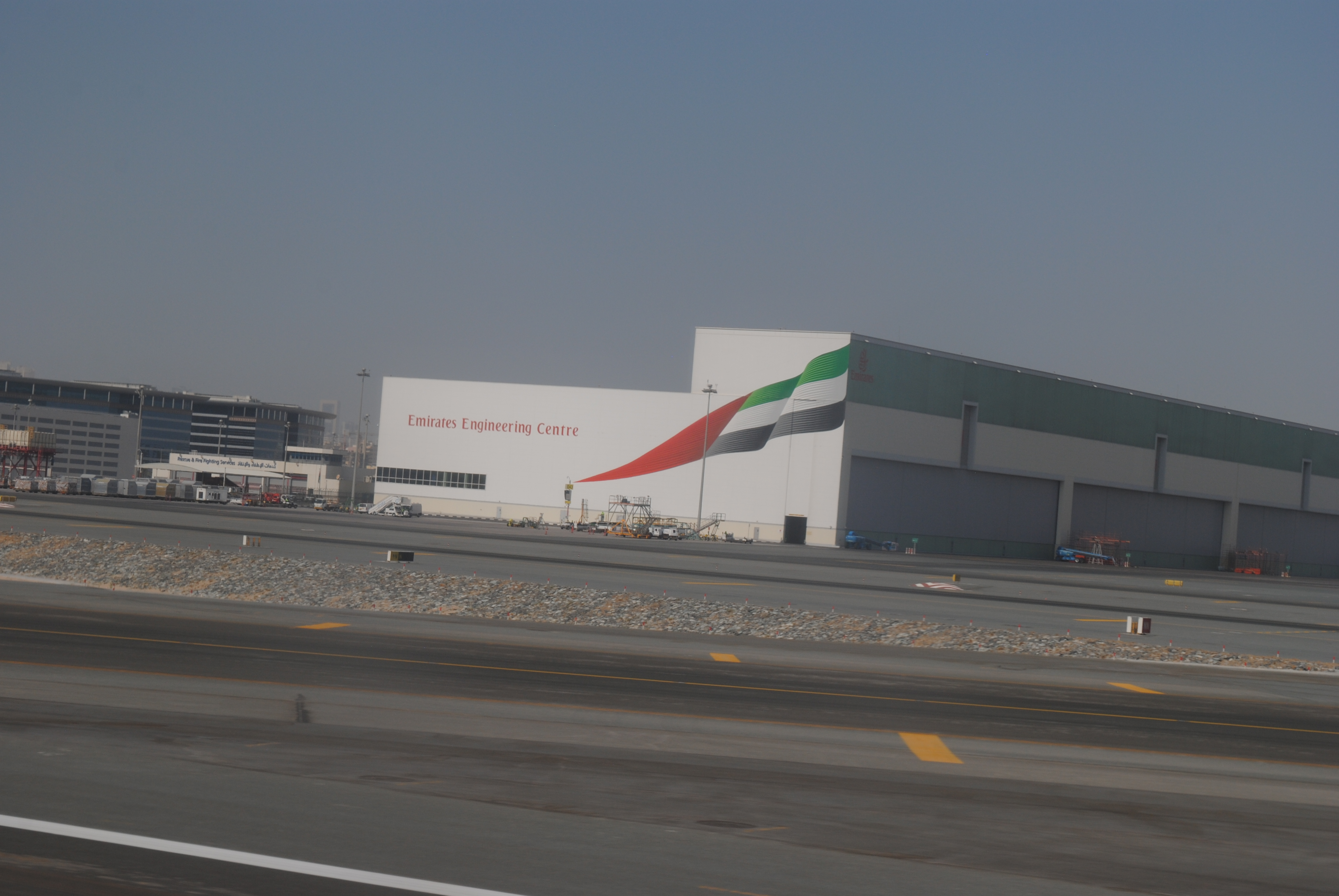
Dubai International Airport - 2024

The third season premiered in Italy on October 5, 2015, in Australia on October 7, 2015, across Asia on October 8, in South Africa on October 15 and the UK on October 28, 2015.
