= The Big Picture with Kal Penn =

The Big Picture with Kal Penn is a documentary series on the National Geographic Channel hosted by Kal Penn. It has aired twelve episodes since its debut on 30 March 2015.
