= Beast Hunter =

- Genre: Paranormal
- Narrated by: Pat Spain
- Country of origin: United States
- Original language: English
- No. of seasons: 1
- No. of episodes: 5

Production
- Executive producer: Ashley Hoppin
- Running time: 45 minutes
- Production company: Icon Films

Original release
- Network: National Geographic Channel
- Release: March 4, 2011

Beast Hunter is a television series that began airing on March 9, 2011 on National Geographic Channel. It is hosted and narrated by wildlife scientist Pat Spain. In each episode, he travels to a different part of the world to investigate an individual cryptid's alleged existence. This typically involves interviews with local witnesses, setting up camera traps, and in some cases, searching for similar animals in the local fossil record. When the series is aired in the UK, it is renamed Beast Man.

== Episodes ==
No.	Title	Original release date
1	"Man Ape of Sumatra"	March 4, 2011
Pat Spain travels the Sumatran rainforest in search of the Orang Pendek.
2	"Nightmare of the Amazon"	March 4, 2011
In the Brazilian Amazon, Pat Spain searches for the Mapinguari, a massive sloth-like creature purported by locals to be behind a series of attacks.
3	"Swamp Monster of the Congo"	March 11, 2011
Mokele-mbembe, a creature reported to resemble a sauropod dinosaur is investigated by Pat Spain in the Congo River basin.
4	"Sea Serpent of the North"	March 18, 2011
Pat Spain dives by submersible off the coast of British Columbia, in search of the alleged sea serpent Cadborosaurus.
5	"Mongolian Death Worm"	March 25, 2011
Pat Spain searches the Gobi Desert for the elusive cryptid known as the Mongolian death worm.

== See also ==
- Cryptid
- Cryptozoology
- MonsterQuest
