= Yukon River Run =

- Genre: Reality
- Country of origin: United States
- No. of seasons: 1
- No. of episodes: 8

Production
- Executive producers: Deirdre Gurney; Scott Gurney; Kevin Tao Mohs
- Running time: 60 minutes
- Production company: Gurney Productions

Original release
- Network: National Geographic Channel
- Release: July 20 – September 7, 2015

Yukon River Run is an American reality television series, produced by Gurney Productions for the National Geographic Channel. The series follows three crews travelling along the Yukon River in Alaska attempting to sell wood and other essential supplies to remote villages along the river, while competing against the other crews to maximise profit.

== Broadcast ==
The series premiered in the U.S. on July 20, 2015 on the National Geographic Channel. It was also scheduled to air at later dates in the United States on Spanish-language channel Nat Geo Mundo, as well as globally in 171 countries in 45 languages on international variations of National Geographic Channel.

In Australia, the series premiered ahead of the U.S. launch on July 6, 2015 on National Geographic Channel Australia. In the United Kingdom, the series began on National Geographic Channel UK & Ireland on July 26, 2015 and on National Geographic Channel Asia on September 15.

== Episodes ==
| No. | Title | Original release date | U.S. viewers (thousands) |
|---|---|---|---|
| 1 | "Profit or Peril" | July 20, 2015 | 619,000 |
| 2 | "Collision Course" | July 27, 2015 | 764,000 |
| 3 | "Braving the Boneyard" | August 3, 2015 | 694,000 |
| 4 | "Into the Darkness" | August 10, 2015 | 866,000 |
| 5 | "Man Down" | August 17, 2015 | 867,000 |
| 6 | "Merciless Miles" | August 24, 2015 | 783,000 |
| 7 | "Into the Freeze" | August 31, 2015 | 988,000 |
| 8 | "Make or Break" | September 7, 2015 | 756,000 |
