= The '90s: The Last Great Decade =

- Also known as: The '90s The '90s: The Decade That Connected Us
- Genre: Documentary; Historical
- Country of origin: United States
- Original language: English
- No. of seasons: 1
- No. of episodes: 9

Production
- Production company: Fox Entertainment

Original release
- Network: National Geographic Channel
- Release: 2014 – 2014

The '90s: The Last Great Decade? is a three-part, six hour documentary on the National Geographic Channel that examines the 1990s. TV Guide describes it as: "A retrospective of the people and events that marked the 1990s." The Daily News describes it as: "Flashback recalls years both grand and giddy, including cyberbiz, Bill Clinton, Anna Nicole Smith, Roseanne Barr and Vanilla Ice."

It is narrated by Rob Lowe and originally aired July 6–8, 2014 at 9 PM. After airing on NGC in the US, it then aired on Spanish-language network Nat Geo Mundo in 171 countries. It was produced by Nutopia. The executive producers are Peter Lovering, Jane Root, Fred Hepburn, Erik Nelson, Michael Cascio; series producer, Glenn Barden. The National Geographic site describes the series: "The '90s: The Last Great Decade? revisits the decade through 'inside out' storytelling and analysis via 120 original interviews—from unsung heroes behind the decade's most riveting stories to the biggest names in politics, tech, movies and music."

It pulled in 1.10 million viewers on the Sunday night it first aired and was the second highest-rated July telecast in National Geographic Channel's history.

== Episode list ==
1. "Great Expectations"
2. "Friends and Enemies"
3. "Politically Incorrect"
4. "America Goes to War"
5. "Reality Bites"
6. "Enemy Within"
7. "Shock and Awe"
8. "Exposed"
9. "The Countdown"

== See also ==
- The Nineties equivalent docu-series produced by CNN
