= Eat: The Story of Food =

- Genre: Documentary
- Country of origin: United States
- Original language: English
- No. of seasons: 1
- No. of episodes: 6

Production
- Executive producers: Brooke Runnette; Erik Nelson; Pam Caragol Wells; Kathleen Cromley
- Running time: 60 minutes (including ads)
- Production companies: Creative Differences; National Geographic Studios

Original release
- Network: National Geographic Channel
- Release: November 21 – November 23, 2014

Eat: The Story of Food is a six-part American documentary television series which aired on the National Geographic Channel from November 21 to 23, 2014.

The show talked to nearly 70 people discussing the origins, history, science and culture of food. Celebrity chefs such as Nigella Lawson, Rachael Ray and Padma Lakshmi were among those taking part in the series.

== Episodes ==
The series consisted of six episodes, with two premiering each night across three consecutive nights. Two special episodes premiered on 12/20/15.

No.	Title	Original release date
1	"Food Revolutionaries"	November 21, 2014
2	"Carnivores"	November 21, 2014
3	"Sugar Rushes"	November 22, 2014
4	"Hooked on Seafood"	November 22, 2014
5	"Guilty Pleasures"	November 23, 2014
6	"Baked and Buzzed"	November 23, 2014
7	"Indulgences"	December 20, 2015
8	"Surf and Turf"	December 20, 2015
