= Abandoned (TV series) =

- Starring: Jay Chaikin; Dan Graham; Mark Pakenas; Ricki Chaikin
- Country of origin: United States
- Original language: English
- No. of seasons: 1
- No. of episodes: 13

Production
- Executive producers: George Plamondon; Betsy Schecter; Michael A. Rosen
- Running time: 22 minutes
- Production company: Picture Shack Entertainment

Original release
- Network: National Geographic Channel
- Release: August 22 – October 3, 2012

Abandoned is an American reality television series by Picture Shack Entertainment that premiered on the National Geographic Channel on August 22, 2012. It was preceded by a pilot episode that aired on December 30, 2011.

The series follows three men who make a living by scavenging abandoned buildings across America.

== Premise ==
Jay Chaikin, owner of "Reclaimed Relics", travels around America with his team, Dan Graham and Mark Pakenas, scouring abandoned buildings for relics of America's history that they can refurbish and sell.

== Episodes ==
No.	Title	Original release date
1	"Maryland Gristmill"	August 22, 2012
2	"Philadelphia AME Church"	August 22, 2012
3	"Pabst Blue Ribbon Factory"	August 29, 2012
4	"Maryland Silk Mill"	August 29, 2012
5	"Mississippi Homestead"	September 5, 2012
6	"Georgia Cotton Gin"	September 5, 2012
7	"Oil City, Pennsylvania Bank"	September 12, 2012
8	"Maine Paper Factory"	September 12, 2012
9	"New York Masonic Lodge"	September 19, 2012
10	"Connecticut Ghost Town"	September 19, 2012
11	"Hot Springs Hotel"	September 26, 2012
12	"Vermont Marble Factory"	September 26, 2012
13	"Scranton Lace Factory"	October 3, 2012

== See also ==
- American Pickers, a similar show on History
