= Doomsday Castle =

2013 American reality TV series

Coordinates: 34°58′41″N 82°43′38″W

Doomsday Castle is a reality television series on National Geographic Channel, that was canceled in 2013, showing the lives of Brenton Bruns and his five children preparing for the end of the world, in a castle he has built near Pickens, South Carolina. The show is a spin-off of Doomsday Preppers; Bruns and his castle were originally featured on the season 2 episode "No Such Thing as a Fair Fight".

Bruns says he built a castle to survive an electromagnetic pulse, since a castle can survive without electricity and defend against raiders. It started as a bunker in 1999, and is continuously being added to. Bruns states that his property is covered with booby traps, and his neighbors are "serious preppers with lots of guns".

== Episodes ==
=== Season 1 (2013) ===
No. overall	No. in season	Title	Original release date
1	1	"Before the Flood"	August 13, 2013
2	2	"Stone from a Sling"	August 20, 2013
3	3	"Water from a Stone"	August 27, 2013
4	4	"Learn to Fear Me"	September 3, 2013
5	5	"Be Fruitful and Multiply"	September 10, 2013
6	6	"The Stranger That Cometh"	September 17, 2013
7	7	"Escape To The Mountain"	September 24, 2013
8	8	"The Days of the Siege"	October 1, 2013
