= American Gypsies =

- Genre: Reality
- Country of origin: United States
- Original language: English
- No. of seasons: 1
- No. of episodes: 9

Production
- Running time: 42-44 minutes
- Production company: Stick Figure Productions

Original release
- Network: National Geographic Channel
- Release: July 17 – September 12, 2012

American Gypsies is an American reality television series on National Geographic Channel. The series debuted on July 17, 2012, and follows the family of John, a Gypsy family in New York City.

== Episodes ==
No.	Title	Original release date
1	"Rivals at War"	July 17, 2012
2	"The Gloves Come Off"	July 24, 2012
3	"Sex, Lies, and Audio Tape"	July 31, 2012
4	"South Beach Invasion"	August 7, 2012
5	"Love for Sale"	August 14, 2012
6	"Ritual Slaughter"	August 21, 2012
7	"Dueling Dads"	August 30, 2012
8	"Shotgun Wedding"	September 6, 2012
9	"My Big Fat Florida Wedding"	September 12, 2012

== See also ==
- My Big Fat American Gypsy Wedding, which aired from 2012 to 2016
