= To Catch a Smuggler =

American documentary television series

- Genre: Documentary; Reality
- Country of origin: United States
- Original language: English
- No. of seasons: 8
- No. of episodes: 74

Production
- Producer: Lucky8

Original release
- Network: National Geographic
- Release: October 8, 2012 – present

To Catch a Smuggler is a documentary television series that depicts the work of U.S. Customs and Border Protection and Homeland Security Investigations law enforcement officers at multiple United States airports. Violations include fraudulent visas, human trafficking, and transportation of contraband items. To Catch a Smuggler is featured on National Geographic.

== Format ==
A typical episode presents several incidents of the following types:

- Interviewing travelers from abroad and examining their documents (passports, visas, etc.), in order to determine whether or not to allow them to enter the country.
- Examining passengers' luggage to find suspected contraband, such as drugs, undeclared currency, or prohibited food items.
- Searching the bodies of individuals suspected of concealing contraband, using methods such as pat-downs, detection dogs, and X-ray scans.
- Detaining individuals suspected of smuggling and turning them over to law enforcement agencies for possible prosecution.
- Investigating criminal smuggling operations (drugs, weapons, counterfeit merchandise, etc.) with the goal of arresting the perpetrators.

== Production ==
The channel features several sister series under the same title, which focus on law enforcement activities at airports and facilities in other countries, including Peru, Brazil, Colombia, Spain, Italy, New Zealand, and the Dutch Caribbean.

The series has been produced by Lucky8 since 2020. National Geographic's site aligns seasons with Lucky8's production.

== Episodes ==
=== Series overview ===
Season	Episodes	Originally released	
Season	Episodes	First released	Last released
Specials	5	October 8, 2012	November 5, 2012
1	8	January 1, 2020	February 19, 2020
2	15	January 20, 2021	May 19, 2021
3	12	February 9, 2022	April 27, 2022
4	10	September 14, 2022	November 16, 2022
5	8	May 10, 2023	June 28, 2023
6	6	July 26, 2023	September 13, 2023
7	8	April 24, 2024	June 13, 2024
8	8	September 2, 2024	October 23, 2024
9	8	July 16, 2025	August 20, 2025
10	8	February 25, 2026	April 14, 2026

=== Specials (2012) ===
No. overall	No. in season	Title	Original release date
1	1	"Courier to Kingpin"	October 8, 2012
2	2	"Cavity Courier"	October 15, 2012
3	3	"Hidden Heroin"	October 22, 2012
4	4	"Coke in the Coat"	October 29, 2012
5	5	"Search & Seize"	November 5, 2012

=== Season 1 (2020) ===
No. overall	No. in season	Title	Original release date
6	1	"Internal Investigation"	January 1, 2020
7	2	"Club Drugs and Party People"	January 7, 2020
8	3	"Suspicious Suitcase"	January 15, 2020
9	4	"Cocaine Crackdown"	January 21, 2020
10	5	"Smuggle Once, Smuggle Twice?"	January 29, 2020
11	6	"Drugs, Guns and Money"	February 5, 2020
12	7	"Cocaine Sausages"	February 12, 2020
13	8	"Decoys, Diversions and Drug Busts"	February 19, 2020

=== Season 2 (2021) ===
No. overall	No. in season	Title	Original release date
14	1	"Mama's Meth"	January 21, 2021
Customs and Border Protection deals with an unruly passenger.
15	2	"The Coke Inside"	January 28, 2021
16	3	"Party Drugs"	February 4, 2021
17	4	"Endangered and Smuggled"	February 11, 2021
18	5	"Hidden Compartments"	February 18, 2021
19	6	"Stash House Takedown"	February 25, 2021
Homeland Security Investigations disrupt a transnational meth ring and Customs and Border Protection seize a huge shipment of illegal shark fins.
20	7	"Coke, Cakes and Cash"	March 3, 2021
21	8	"Dark Web and Liquid Drugs"	March 11, 2021
22	9	"Cocaine Shoes"	April 8, 2021
Hidden among the millions who enter the U.S. through JFK, MIA and ATL is dangerous contraband. DHS will stop at nothing to catch these smugglers.
23	10	"Lockdown Lockup"	April 15, 2021
24	11	"Fentanyl Within"	April 21, 2021
25	12	"Mobile Meth"	April 29, 2021
26	13	"Express Delivery Ecstasy"	May 6, 2021
27	14	"Mega Millions Meth Stash"	May 13, 2021
While inspecting commercial cargo from Mexico, Laredo Customs and Border Protection discovers liquid methamphetamine concealed within paint buckets. In Atlanta, Homeland Security Investigations conducts a controlled delivery of an air conditioner filled with 2 kgs of meth.
28	15	"Meth Lab Takedown"	May 20, 2021

=== Season 3 (2022) ===
No. overall	No. in season	Title	Original release date
29	1	"Smuggled and Muzzled"	February 9, 2022
30	2	"Jungle Stash"	February 23, 2022
31	3	"Bunked in a Trunk"	February 23, 2022
32	4	"Smorgasbord of Smack"	March 2, 2022
33	5	"Killer Ketamine"	March 9, 2022
34	6	"Guns of New York"	March 16, 2022
35	7	"Gas Tank Meth"	March 23, 2022
36	8	"Powdered Rims"	March 30, 2022
37	9	"Million Dollar Ride"	April 6, 2022
38	10	"Dope on a Rope"	April 14, 2022
39	11	"Six Million Dollar Seizure"	April 21, 2022
40	12	"Drug Boat Bust"	April 27, 2022

=== Season 4 (2022) ===
No. overall	No. in season	Title	Original release date
41	1	"Cocaine Snapper"	September 15, 2022
42	2	"Talibani Treasure Trove"	September 22, 2022
43	3	"Tunnel from Tijuana"	September 29, 2022
44	4	"Dark Net Dragnet"	October 6, 2022
45	5	"Blow Overboard"	October 12, 2022
46	6	"Coke on the Water"	October 19, 2022
47	7	"MDMA on the Move"	October 27, 2022
48	8	"Meth in the City"	November 2, 2022
49	9	"Guac and Coke"	November 9, 2022
50	10	"It's Raining Meth"	November 16, 2022

=== Season 5 (2023) ===
No. overall	No. in season	Title	Original release date
51	1	"Boatloads of Coke"	May 10, 2023
52	2	"Hot Drugs"	May 17, 2023
53	3	"Popped for Pills"	May 24, 2023
54	4	"Bananas and Blow"	May 31, 2023
55	5	"The Coke Eater"	June 7, 2023
56	6	"Dope in the Hood"	June 14, 2023
57	7	"Freeway Meth"	June 21, 2023
58	8	"Ice Cold Cocaine"	June 28, 2023

=== Season 6 (2023) ===
No. overall	No. in season	Title	Original release date
59	1	"Junk in the Trunk"	July 26, 2023
60	2	"Asleep on Lots of Coke"	August 2, 2023
61	3	"To the Grinder"	August 9, 2023
62	4	"Money Dog"	August 16, 2023
63	5	"Fentanyl Express"	August 23, 2023
64	6	"Gold Diggers"	August 30, 2023
65	7	"Meth Magnets and Dirty Money"	September 6, 2023
66	8	"Cocaine Rides in the Crew Cab"	September 13, 2023

=== Season 7 (2024) ===
No. overall	No. in season	Title	Original release date
67	1	"Cocaine Leaks and Ancient Greeks"	April 24, 2024
68	2	"Not My Meth"	May 1, 2024
69	3	"Pots of Coke"	May 8, 2024
70	4	"Coke and the Kids"	May 16, 2024
71	5	"New Drug on the Block"	May 23, 2024
72	6	"My Big Fat Weed Run"	May 30, 2024
73	7	"Coked-up Oatmeal"	June 6, 2024
74	8	"Flesh, Bones, Ketamine and Drones"	June 13, 2024

=== Season 8 (2024) ===
No. overall	No. in season	Title	Original release date
75	1	"Unholy Guacamole"	September 2, 2024
Homeland Security Investigations tails a cargo truck to LA and uncovers cocaine hidden in frozen avocado pulp. Customs and Border Protection finds psychedelic mushrooms and disrupts a stolen car ring.
76	2	"Weed In, Weed Out"	September 4, 2024
Border Patrol scans the interstate for smugglers and stops a suspect who flees arrest. Customs and Border Protection seizes large amounts of inbound and outbound marijuana.
77	3	"Blitzed at the Border"	September 11, 2024
78	4	"No Rest for the Wicked"	September 25, 2024
79	5	"Spiced and Loaded"	October 2, 2024
80	6	"Drugs, Bugs, and the Big Buy-Bust"	October 9, 2024
81	7	"Drugs, Bugs, and the Big Buy-Bust"	October 16, 2024
82	8	"Meth Inside the Machine"	October 23, 2024
