= Doomsday Preppers =

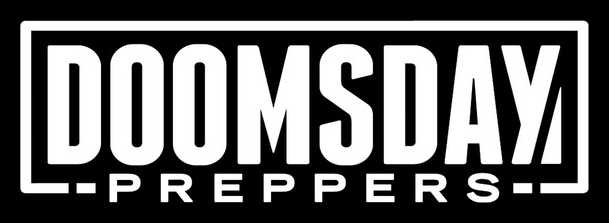
- Genre: Reality
- Country of origin: United States
- Original language: English
- No. of seasons: 4
- No. of episodes: 54

Production
- Executive producers: Alan Madison; Kathleen Cromley; Matt Sharp
- Producers: Dominique Andrews; Brian Stone
- Running time: 44 minutes
- Production company: Sharp Entertainment; NGC Studios

Original release
- Network: National Geographic Channel
- Release: February 7, 2012 – August 28, 2014

Doomsday Preppers is an American reality television series that aired on the National Geographic Channel from 2012 to 2014. The program profiles various survivalists, or "preppers", who are preparing to survive the various circumstances that may cause the end of civilization, including economic collapse, societal collapse, and electromagnetic pulse. The quality of their preparations is graded by the consulting company Practical Preppers, who provide analysis and recommendations for improvements.

== Development ==
Casting for the first season began September 2011. Casting for a second season began April 2012. The series' third season premiered on October 29, 2013. The series concluded its fourth and final season in August 2014.

Dräger equipment, Wise Food Storage Company and the United States Gold Bureau are sponsors of the show.

== Reception ==
Doomsday Preppers has received varied reviews. Neil Genzlinger in The New York Times condemned it as "absurd excess on display," noting "what an easy target the prepper worldview is for ridicule" and "how offensively anti-life these shows are, full of contempt for humankind." Nevertheless, "The program has been a ratings bonanza, with a 60-percent male audience, with an average age of 44." "Doomsday Preppers is the network's most-watched series". Brooklyn Bagwell, casting director for the second season, claimed it was the highest-rated show in the history of the National Geographic Channel.

In response to negative comments, Jay Desai, who was featured in the show's first season, responded: "We don’t make it an obsession like some folks but we do spend a fair amount of time and money on it. ... you can’t always rely on the government or society to help you. The more people that are prepping minded, the better off we’ll all do."

== Episodes ==
=== Season 1 (2012) ===
No. overall	No. in series	Title	Original release date	U.S. viewers (millions)
0	0	"Pilot"	June 27, 2011	N/A
Dennis McClung and family show their backyard food production system; Lisa Bedford (The Survival Mom) takes urban preparation to a new level in preparing for a financial collapse; the Kobler and Hunt families combine forces to ensure food production through an economic collapse. David Kobler and Scott Hunt are the owners of Practical Preppers, a company that provides expert evaluation in later episodes. Highlights: urban farming, aquaponics, tilapia, west African dwarf goat, Garden Pool; wood gas, combat information
1	1	"Bullets, Lots of Bullets"	February 7, 2012	1.296
Paul Range and friends prepare for a polar shift; in California, Christopher Nyerges demonstrates urban jungle survival skills to be used in the event of a massive earthquake; deep in the heart of Houston, Texas, Megan Hurwitt hopes to survive on her own and escape to Mexico after the Middle East suddenly cuts off its oil exports. Highlights: Supplies — Shipping container homes - Bug-out - Wild edible plants - Firearms - Urban survival
2	2	"I Hope I Am Crazy"	February 7, 2012	1.214
David Sarti, a YouTube "firearms instructor" and self-taught survivalist, is prepared for an electrical grid failure; Kellene Bishop of Utah has stocked only the finest gourmet survival foods in preparation for financial collapse; Kathy Harrison, "the Doris Day of Doom", has prepared her local community for a New Madrid earthquake; Dennis Evers brings the family together to survive global chaos caused by hyperinflation. Highlights: EMP Information - Creative emergency cooking — Handguns - Self Defense - Self sufficiency — Community survival
3	3	"Back to the Stone Age"	February 14, 2012	1.031
Tim Ralston — The manufacturer of a survival tool manufacturer, the Crovel, loses part of a thumb during firearms practice for the show; Jason Charles, a New York City fireman-turned-prepper, demonstrates urban survival skills; Jules Dervaes is preparing for the collapse of the industrial food system; Pat Brabble insists on surviving hyperinflation by planning ahead. Highlights: GMO information — Shooting Accident - Bug-out bag - Close combat skills - Water storage - MREs - Urban agriculture
4	4	"It's All Gonna Hit the Fan"	February 21, 2012	1.013
Martin Colvill lives on the road with his wife as a "survival trucker" and looks to prepare for the upcoming economic collapse; Donna Nash is prepared to quarantine all her family members to protect against a global pandemic; Kevin O'Brien is concerned about losing his home due to rising sea levels created by global warming or a sudden polar shift. Highlights: Weapons training — Security systems - Home defense - Polar Shift
5	5	"You Shall Not Fear"	February 28, 2012	0.825
Michael Patrick Douglas, a man of the land in Maine, shows off homesteading techniques he believes will become necessary due to overpopulation; Larry Hall turns an underground missile silo into a bunker to make sure his family is safe in any event; Becky Brown (of Grab n Go Food Storage) is making sure she and others are ready for martial law. Highlights: Family survival - Home security - Primitive tools and weapons — Sniper skills — Underground bunkers
6	6	"Nine Meals Away from Anarchy"	March 6, 2012	N/A
For Mike Mester, civil unrest is just around the corner and he aims to get everyone ready; Colorado computer programmer Preston White has collected over 11,200 types of seeds and plans for biosphere living in a Fukushima-irradiated future while his friends provide supportive help; Riley Cook spends his days working close to home and with the prepper society building underground structures. Highlights: Nuclear disaster information — Biospheres - Seedbank - Animals for defense — Fuel storage - Food storage - Alternative fuel resources — Underground bunkers
7	7	"Into the Spider Hole"	March 13, 2012	1.078
Doug Huffman is prepared, teaching techniques for surviving a second depression caused by America's massive debts.; Dianne and Greg Rogers, dedicated parents in Canada, are concerned with future events affecting their home life; Ed and Dianna Peden ("still living in the 60's") of Topeka, Kansas, are preparing to survive underground in their decommissioned Atlas missile silo when doomsday arrives. Highlights: Fish, vegetable, chicken and rabbit production - Root cellar - Camouflage - Small arms
8	8	"It's Gonna Get Worse"	March 27, 2012	0.915
Bruce Beach, a lifelong prepper, is focused on nuclear war and saving children in his 42 underground buses; Jeremy and Kelly, concerned parents in Salt Lake City, are preparing for the collapse of society due to peak oil; Bradford Frank of San Diego works around the clock in preparation for a pandemic that could end life as we know it. Highlights: Ark Two Shelter - Peak oil - Water Resources — Antibiotics — Bug-out Vehicle - Bird Flu
9	9	"Close the Door, Load the Shotgun"	April 3, 2012	N/A
John Major has moved his family to Idaho for a more natural lifestyle; Janet Spencer, an author in Montana, decided because of her location to prepare for refugees fleeing from disasters in larger nearby cities; Jack & Jackie Jobe, though new to prepping, have made great progress in preparing for their future survival. Highlights: Edible insects - Superfood - Dirty bomb - Survival Seedbanks — Food storage
10	10	"Disaster Doesn't Wait"	April 10, 2012	N/A
Barry, Pink and Cole have the ultimate urban underground bunker right in their garage; Steve Pace, a hometown survivalist, is ready to take on long-term electric failure; Carolina resident Laura Kunzie is preparing for a massive airborne flu outbreak. Highlights: Bunkers — Off-Grid Sanitation — Bug out - EMP - Hillbilly faraday cage - Bird Flu - Quarantine
11	11	"I Suggest We Run"	April 17, 2012	0.861
Texas prepper "Mr. Wayne" bases his doomsday fears on a Chinese financial takeover and has prepared many ways to survive such events; John & Cristina Sellers are hardworking Americans who want to protect what they have; Jason & Tanya have done their homework on how life and prepping can happen on a budget. Highlights: Underground Storage — Reloading bullets - Explosives - Bartering - Gold panning
12	12	"Extreme Prep Edition"	April 24, 2012	N/A
National Geographic brings the year together by looking at how some people have prepared in similar ways and reminds viewers that even a little emergency preparation is better than none. Highlights: Underground bunkers — Food storage — Water — Firearms — Defense — Emergency Transportation

=== Season 2 (2012–13) ===
No. overall	No. in series	Title	Original release date	U.S. viewers (millions)
13	1	"You Can't Let Evil Win"	November 4, 2012	N/A
Johnny O is prepping for terrorist attacks on nuclear power plants. Highlights: Nuclear reactor attacks - Emergency evacuations - Bug-out
14	2	"Am I Nuts or Are You?"	November 13, 2012	1.37
Jason Beacham is a 15-year-old boy who has been prepping for economic collapse since age 11; Big Al is a Tennessee musician who is prepping for a Russian nuclear attack with a secret mountainous bug-out location; former racer Braxton Southwick of Salt Lake City is prepping for a biological terrorist attack. Highlights: Economic collapse - Bioterrorism
15	3	"Bad Times All the Time"	November 20, 2012	N/A
Jay Blevins is a former law enforcement officer who is prepping with his family and neighbors for a global economic collapse; Brian Murdock and his Colombian wife-to-be Tatiana are preparing to relocate from suburban Somerville, Massachusetts, to somewhere in Upstate New York; Indiana preppers Bryan and Lacey May are ready for an earthquake along the New Madrid Fault Line, stockpiling silver, gold, food, and other barter and installing a battery backup to their wind and solar power generators. Highlights: Social unrest - Economic crisis - Self-defense - Homemade Pepper spray
16	4	"The Time of Reckoning"	November 27, 2012	0.77
Tom Perez has spent over 12 years prepping for widespread chaos following the detonation of a dirty bomb by terrorists. Highlights: Dirty bomb - Terrorist attacks
17	5	"Taking from the Haves"	December 4, 2012	N/A
Jeff Bushaw plans to fly his family to safety following the eruption of the Yellowstone supervolcano; Allen and Franco have built sustainable food production systems in preparation for worldwide food shortages; John Adrain has invented numerous security gadgets to turn his estate into a technological fortress safe from a wide range of disasters. Highlights: Yellowstone Supervolcano - Global food crisis - Home automation - Aquaponics
18	6	"You've Got Chaos"	December 11, 2012	0.83
Bob Kay, a nutritional scientist in Southern California, is prepping for environmental destruction due to massive earthquakes; politician Joshua Wander is preparing for a terrorist attack, teaching others about prepping and stocking up kosher foods (matzos and MRE's); Ryan Croft is prepping for a global financial crisis by cultivating alternative food sources like spirulina and earthworms. Highlights: Earthquake - Terrorist attack - Xeriscaping - Edible insects
19	7	"Escape from New York"	December 18, 2012	N/A
Three New York preppers plan to escape from a variety of disasters: student Cameron Moore hopes to flee a meltdown from a nearby nuclear plant; Margaret Ling is planning to take flight in case another hurricane strikes her city, recalling the events of Hurricane Sandy; Jay, remembering the September 11 attacks, is preparing to escape with his family from another terrorist attack on the city. Highlights: Hurricane Sandy - Social unrest - Bug-out - Evacuation
20	8	"No Such Thing as a Fair Fight"	January 1, 2013	N/A
Brent has built a medieval castle and is teaching his children and grandchildren new tactics of defense and survival because he fears an Electromagnetic Pulse, caused by a nuclear detonation, will cripple the national power lines, possibly forever (this was spun off into its own series, Doomsday Castle); in Bear Grass, North Carolina, Derek Price also fears an EMP and is using his privately owned amusement park, Deadwood, to help himself, his friends, and his family survive.
21	9	"Prepared, not Scared"	January 8, 2013	0.80
Bryan Smith, remembering his eventful past, has been prepping for an economic collapse; Christine has been using her skills, organization, and strictness to prepare for a mega-tsunami caused by the potential collapse of the Cumbre Vieja volcano, which could wipe out the East Coast of the United States.
22	10	"In the Hurt Locker"	January 15, 2013	N/A
Lucas Cameron, a farmer living in Tennessee, is joined by his friends and family in preparing for a New Madrid earthquake and the civil unrest that might follow; Kevin O'Brien, first mentioned in Season 1, has recently moved out and joined them; near Denver Colorado, Snake Blocker is preparing to survive like his ancestors, the Apache tribe, by living off the land in the event of a financial collapse.
23	11	"Preppers Paradise"	January 22, 2013	N/A
Lindsay, a radio host and a supporter of the back-to-the-land movement, together with her family and friends, are ready for a total failure of the agricultural and food system; Jim D and his daughter, who have a "bug-out vehicle" called The Behemoth, are preparing for a cyber-terrorist attack which can shut down today's technology and power grid.
24	12	"Hit The Ground Running"	February 5, 2013	N/A
25	13	"Solutions Not Problems"	February 12, 2013	N/A
Doug, who owns a rock hauling business in Tennessee, plans to "bug-in" with his family in his underground bunker, using a hillside of boulders to ward off potential threats and stockpiling coins minted before the 1970s because their higher silver content will makes them useful for bartering; Jeff Flaningham is a single Wisconsin native looking for woman who will live with him in his decommissioned SM-65 Atlas missile silo in rural central Kansas after a catastrophic event; Jeff goes on dates with three women he has met through an online dating service and arranges a second date with one of them, Stephanie, at his missile silo. Highlights: Coins of the United States dollar - water purification
26	14	"Pain Is Good"	February 19, 2013	N/A
Craig Compeau, a third-generation Alaskan who is prepping for a government takeover, has set up a remote prefabricated InterShelter dome in the Alaskan wilderness; 44-year-old adventurer David Lakota is depending on his intuition, his connection to nature, and the mountainous terrain of Hawaii to survive a giant tsunami; David and his girlfriend Rachaelle bug out with minimal supplies from the Kalalau Valley on Kauaʻi to the 4000-foot-high plateaus above. Highlights: Moose hunting - Edible wild plants - Barefoot hiking
27	15	"A Fortress at Sea"	March 5, 2013	N/A
Kevin lives in eastern Washington and is prepping his family for a volcanic eruption using multiple bug-out vehicles; Captain Bill Simpson has built a bunker sailboat made mostly of iron so that he can retreat out to sea in case a massive solar flare sends an Electromagnetic Pulse (EMP) that damages modern technology.
28	16	"Let Her Rip"	March 12, 2013	N/A
Freda, a modern-day descendant of the Hatfield Clan, is living in the woods of Virginia and preparing to survive an Electromagnetic Pulse (EMP) and ensuing civil uprisings and martial law; in Oregon, Mike Adams, a restaurant owner, is readying himself and his family for a nationwide terrorist takeover.
29	17	"Gonna Be a Big Bang"	March 19, 2013	N/A
Brad and his family are preparing to survive an economic collapse in their backyard bunker; in Kansas, Kevin Barber has devised a plan to escape economic collapse by permanently settling down in Costa Rica.
30	18	"Lone Wolves and Lovers"	March 26, 2013	N/A
This episode was a recap episode of Season 2.
31	19	"Don’t Betray the Colony"	August 13, 2013	N/A
32	20	"The Gates of Hell"	August 20, 2013	N/A
Steve works with a stern hand to prep his family for potential threats; South Carolinian David Appleton is a comedian, but the idea of a devastating earthquake is no joke to him; David's job doesn't always pay the bills, so he must dumpster dive to find supplies to make a DIY camouflage net to hide his preparations.
33	21	"Whatever It Takes"	August 27, 2013	N/A
34	22	"People Become Animals"	September 3, 2013	N/A

=== Season 3 (2013) ===
No. overall	No. in series	Title	Original release date	U.S. viewers (millions)
35	1	"Take Our Country Back"	October 29, 2013	N/A
Curt has built a fortress at his 80-acre estate in high desert of Oregon, outfitted with a 3,000-square-foot greenhouse, an artificial lake, infrared cameras, a high-tech software system, and 30 bugout vehicles; former Army Ranger Rodney Dial, from Ketchikan, Alaska, obtains an Armored Personnel Carrier called "War Machine" as he hides supplies in large metal underwater pods and his family practices an offensive strategy called "rolling thunder." Highlights: Greenhouses - water supply - firearm training
36	2	"Top Survivors"	November 3, 2013	N/A
The episode recaps the six highest-scoring preppers of the first two seasons: 6) John Adrain (season 2, episode 5); 5) Bryan Smith (season 2, episode 9); 4) Craig Compeau (season 2, episode 14); 3) Cpt. Bill Simpson (season 2, episode 15); 2) "The Colony" (season 2, episode 19), and 1) Paul Range and Gloria Haswell (season 1, episode 1). Highlights:
37	3	"The Fight Ahead"	November 6, 2013	N/A
Highlights: aquaponics, quad
38	4	"We are the Marauders"	November 13, 2013	N/A
Tyler Smith, the leader of a group calling themselves the "Marauders," describes his plans to commit armed robbery; he was later arrested and booked on two counts of second-degree unlawful possession of a firearm because he was a previously convicted child sex offender and was legally barred from possessing firearms. Asked for comment on Smith’s arrest, National Geographic issued a statement: "We are aware of the arrest and have decided not to air this episode until all legal matters are sorted out"; the episode was eventually aired. Highlights: Body armor, Costa Rica
39	5	"Total Destruction"	November 19, 2013	N/A
Tracy Foutch adds armor to a school bus to create a bugout vehicle; Dan Rojas uses a Fresnel lens scavenged from an old rear-projection TV to focus sunlight, sterilize water via distillation, and cook meat. Highlights:
40	6	"Survival is an Ugly Beast"	November 26, 2013	N/A
Rob builds a system of elaborate booby traps around his home near Dallas; Greg builds a near-invisible bugout location in the woods. Highlights: booby traps, camouflage
41	7	"Live Bees, Live Ammo"	December 3, 2013	N/A
John Tucker builds a bugout vehicle, turning bee hives into a mobile apiary with scythed wheels; Bret and Shane Maggio construct a sniper tower with a zip line, allowing for a quick escape. Highlights:
42	8	"No One Will Ever Know"	December 10, 2013	N/A
Highlights:
43	9	"No Stranger to Strangers"	December 18, 2013	N/A
Highlights:
44	10	"Nobody Will Be Ready"	January 7, 2014	N/A
Two Tennessee men named David are both getting ready for a massive earthquake along the New Madrid Fault: David Mays is building a fleet of drones to help him survive in West Tennessee, while David Nash builds a 14-ton geodesic shelter out of concrete in Middle Tennessee. Highlights:
45	11	"Americans Not Ameri-can'ts"	January 7, 2014	N/A
Highlights:

=== Season 4 (2014) ===
No. overall	No. in series	Title	Original release date	U.S. viewers (millions)
47	1	"From Bunkers to Bug Out"	July 17, 2014	N/A
Highlights:
48	2	"Back to the Basics"	July 24, 2014	N/A
Highlights:
49	3	"To Fail Is to Die"	July 24, 2014	N/A
Highlights:
50	4	"Be the Prep"	July 31, 2014	N/A
Highlights:
51	5	"Shepherds and Wolves"	August 7, 2014	N/A
Highlights:
52	6	"Back to the Dark Ages"	August 14, 2014	N/A
Highlights:
53	7	"You Said It Was Non-Lethal"	August 21, 2014	N/A
Highlights:
54	8	"There Will Be Chaos"	August 28, 2014	N/A
Highlights:
