= National Geographic (American TV channel) =

American television network

- Country: United States
- Broadcast area: Worldwide; Nationwide
- Headquarters: Washington, D.C., U.S.

Programming
- Picture format: 720p HDTV

Ownership
- Owner: The Walt Disney Company (2019–present)
- Parent: National Geographic Global Networks
- Sister channels: List: ABC; A&E; Crime & Investigation; Disney Channel; Disney Jr.; Disney XD; ESPN; ESPN2; ESPNews; Freeform; FX; FXX; FX Movie Channel; FYI; History Channel; History en Espanol; Lifetime; LMN; Longhorn Network; Military History; Nat Geo Wild; SEC Network; Vice

History
- Launched: January 7, 2001; 25 years ago
- Former names: National Geographic Channel (2001–2016)

Links
- Website: natgeotv.com

Availability

Streaming media
- Affiliated Streaming Service: Disney+
- Service(s): YouTube TV, Hulu + Live TV, Sling TV, FuboTV, Vidgo, DirecTV Stream

National Geographic (formerly National Geographic Channel; abbreviated and trademarked as Nat Geo or Nat Geo TV) is an American pay television network and flagship channel owned by the National Geographic Global Networks unit of Disney Entertainment and National Geographic Partners, a joint venture between the Walt Disney Company (73%) and the National Geographic Society (27%), with the operational management handled by Disney Entertainment.

The flagship channel airs non-fiction television programs produced by National Geographic and other production companies. Like History (which is 50% owned by Disney through A&E Networks) and Discovery Channel, the channel features documentaries with factual content involving nature, science, culture, and history, plus some reality and pseudo-scientific entertainment programming. Its primary sister network worldwide, including the United States, is Nat Geo Wild, which focuses on animal-related programs.

As of November 2023, Nat Geo is available to approximately 70,000,000 pay television households in the United States- down from its 2016 peak of 91,000,000 households.

== History ==
In the United States, under leadership of its president Tim T. Kelly, the National Geographic Channel launched on January 7, 2001, as a joint venture of National Geographic Television & Film and Fox Cable Networks. National Geographic provides programming expertise and the Fox Networks Group provides its expertise on distribution, marketing, and advertising sales.

National Geographic Channel logo (2004–2013)

The '90s: The Last Great Decade, a documentary series narrated by Rob Lowe, pulled in 1.10 million viewers, and was the second highest-rated July telecast in the National Geographic Channel rating history. The 2000s: A New Reality, also narrated by Lowe, premiered on July 12, 2015.

On November 14, 2016, National Geographic Channel changed its name to simply National Geographic to drop the "Channel" from its name.

On December 14, 2017, in a deal, the Walt Disney Company announced it would buy the majority of 21st Century Fox. Disney would assume control of Fox's controlling stake in the National Geographic partnership thereafter. Following the acquisition, National Geographic and its sister channels were folded into Walt Disney Television, with the president of the National Geographic Partners reporting directly to the Walt Disney Television chairman. Disney officially closed the deal on March 20, 2019, having then added Nat Geo into its portfolio of networks. With Disney’s acquisition of National Geographic, some live events from ABC News in relation to science may air on the channel.

== TV series ==
National Geographic Channel's TV series, in alphabetical order:

- Abandoned
- Access 360° World Heritage
- Air Crash Investigation
- Alaska State Troopers
- American Chainsaw
- American Colony: Meet the Hutterites
- American Genius
- American Gypsies
- American Weed
- America's Lost Treasures
- Amish: Out of Order
- Ancient Secrets
- Apocalypse 101
- Are You Tougher Than a Boy Scout?
- Banged Up Abroad
- Battleground Afghanistan
- Beast Hunter
- Bid & Destroy
- Big, Bigger, Biggest
- The Big Picture with Kal Penn
- Bizarre Dinosaurs
- Borderforce USA: The Bridges
- The Boonies
- Border Wars
- Brain Games
- Breakout
- Building Wild
- Cesar 911
- Chasing UFOs
- Construction Zone
- Cosmos: A Spacetime Odyssey
- Crowd Control
- Diggers
- Dino Autopsy
- Dino Death Match
- Dino Death Trap
- Dinosaurs Decoded
- Do Or Die
- Do Or Die: The Animals
- Dogs with Jobs
- Doomsday Castle
- Doomsday Preppers
- Drugged
- Drugs, Inc.
- Drain the Oceans
- Duck Quacks Don't Echo
- Eat: The Story of Food
- Europe From Above
- Expedition Wild Week
- Explorer
- Eyewitness War
- Family Beef
- Family Guns
- Forecast: Disaster
- Genius
- Going Ape
- Hacking The System
- Hard Time
- Hell on the Highway
- Highway Thru Hell
- The Hot Zone
- Inside the American Mob
- Inside Combat Rescue
- Inside: Secret America
- Inside: Thirumala Tirupathi
- Kentucky Justice
- Lawless Oceans
- The Legend of Mick Dodge
- Let it Ride
- Life After Dinosaurs
- Life Below Zero
- Life Hacker
- The Link
- Live Free or Die
- Locked Up Abroad
- Lords of War
- Mars
- Megastructures
- Meltdown
- Mountain Movers
- Mudcats
- The Numbers Game
- Origins: The Journey of Humankind
- One World: Together at Home
- One Strange Rock
- Phobia
- Polygamy, USA
- Port Protection
- Primal Survivor
- "Planet Carniovore: Lion"
- Race to the Center of the Earth
- Remote Survival
- Richard Hammond's Engineering Connections
- Rocket City Rednecks
- Scam City
- Science of Stupid
- Seconds from Disaster
- Sky Monsters
- Snake Salvation
- Southern Justice
- StarTalk
- Street Genius
- The Story of God with Morgan Freeman
- The Story of Us with Morgan Freeman
- Supercars
- SharkFest
- SuperCroc
- Taboo
- To Catch a Smuggler
- The '80s: The Decade that Made Us
- The '90s: The Last Great Decade?
  (also entitled The '90s: The Decade that Connected Us)
- The 2000s: The Decade We Saw It All
- The Truth Behind
- T-Rex Autopsy
- T-Rex Walks
- Ultimate Airport Dubai
- Ultimate Dino Survivor
- Ultimate Factories
- Ultimate Survival Alaska
- When Crocs Ate Dinosaurs
- Wicked Tuna
- Wicked Tuna: Outer Banks
- Wild Amazon
- Wild Justice
- Wild Russia
- Witness: Disaster
- WW2 Hell Under the sea
- You Can't Lick Your Elbow
- Yukon Gold
- Yukon River Run

Since 2019, as part of Disney’s acquisition of National Geographic’s parent company 20th Century Studios, ABC’s live news coverage of significant scientific events such as rocket launches are simulcast on National Geographic’s linear channel.

== Theme fanfare music ==
The National Geographic Channel's signature theme fanfare music, which is played at the beginning of many of the channel's television programs, was composed by Elmer Bernstein. It was originally written in 1964 for the Society's television specials, which were broadcast on CBS, ABC, PBS and NBC from 1964 until the early 2000s.

== Other National Geographic American channels ==
=== National Geographic HD ===
The United States 720p high definition simulcast of the National Geographic Channel launched in January 2006. It is available on all major cable and satellite providers.

=== Nat Geo Wild ===
Nat Geo Wild (stylized as Nat Geo WILD or abbreviated as NGW) is a cable/satellite TV channel focused on animal-related programs. It is a sister network to National Geographic Channel and it is the latest channel to be jointly launched by the National Geographic Society and Fox Cable Networks. It was launched in United States on March 29, 2010, focusing primarily on wildlife and natural history programming.

=== Nat Geo Mundo ===
Nat Geo Mundo
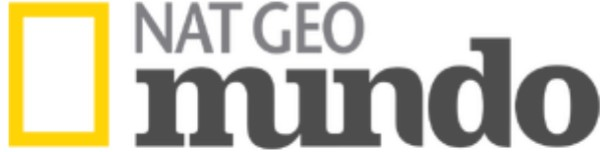
- Logo used since 2011
- Country: United States
- Broadcast area: Nationwide

Programming
- Language: Spanish
- Picture format: 480i SDTV

Ownership
- Owner: The Walt Disney Company
- Parent: National Geographic Global Networks

History
- Launched: 2011; 15 years ago

Availability

Streaming media
- Service(s): FuboTV, YouTube TV, Vidgo, Sling TV, DirecTV Stream

Nat Geo Mundo is broadcast in American Spanish, and was launched in 2011. It shares programming with the Nat Geo Channel available in Hispanic American countries. The channel is fully owned by the National Geographic Society with no involvement from Disney General Entertainment Content.

=== Nat Geo TV ===
Nat Geo TV is an application for smartphones and tablet computers, along with Windows 10. It allows subscribers of participating pay television providers (such as Spectrum and Comcast Xfinity) numerous viewing options, including individual episodes of National Geographic and Nat Geo Wild's original series and documentaries (which are made available live). On August 23, 2024, Disney began notifying its carriage partners it would discontinue the mobile and digital media player apps for Nat Geo TV, along with DisneyNOW, Freeform, FXNOW and ABC, effective September 23. TV Everywhere content would still be available via their respective websites in order to funnel viewers towards Disney+ and Hulu.

== Controversy and criticism ==
Archaeologists have protested that National Geographic shows such as Diggers and Nazi War Diggers promote the looting and destruction of archaeological sites by promoting the work of metal detecting souvenir hunters and collectable dealers. In 2013 the National Geographic Channel set off a firestorm of controversy with its reality show Diggers. Professional archaeologists from the Society for Historical Archaeology, the largest scholarly group concerned with the archaeology of the modern world (A.D. 1400–present), roundly criticized the network for promoting the theft of cultural materials on public and private land.

The show Nazi War Diggers was accused of showing unscientific and disrespectful handling of human remains. A promotional quote from a military relic dealer, "I feel that by selling things that are Nazi-related and for lots of money, I am preserving things that museums don't want to deal with," was removed from the channel's website in March 2014. National Geographic expressed regret for how the series was presented by its own website but maintained that many of the accusations against the series were based on misinformation. The program was subsequently pulled from the schedules while National Geographic reviewed allegations against the series. The show was repackaged, amid controversy, as Battlefield Recovery for air during 2016 on Channel 5 in the UK.

== See also ==
- List of documentary television channels
- List of National Geographic documentary films
- List of programs broadcast by National Geographic Channel
- National Geographic Abu Dhabi
- National Geographic (Asia)
- National Geographic (Australia and New Zealand)
- National Geographic (Canadian TV channel)
- National Geographic (France)
- National Geographic (Germany)
- National Geographic (Greece)
- National Geographic (India)
- National Geographic (Netherlands)
- National Geographic (South Korea)
- National Geographic (UK and Ireland)
- National Geographic (Latin America)
- National Geographic Farsi
- Nat Geo People
