= National Geographic (disambiguation) =

- National Geographic is the official journal of the National Geographic Society.

National Geographic or NatGeo may also refer to:

- National Geographic Society, an American non-profit scientific and educational institution
- National Geographic Partners, a for-profit media and travel company
- List of National Geographic cover stories, Cover stories from 1959 to 2025
- National Geographic Global Networks, formerly National Geographic Channels, the cable channel company of National Geographic Partners operating the following channels:
  - National Geographic (American TV channel)
  - National Geographic (Asian TV channel)
  - National Geographic (Australian and New Zealand TV channel)
  - National Geographic (British and Irish TV channel)
  - National Geographic (Canadian TV channel)
  - National Geographic (Dutch TV channel)
  - National Geographic (French TV channel)
  - National Geographic (German TV channel)
  - National Geographic (Greek TV channel)
  - National Geographic (Indian TV channel)
  - National Geographic (Portuguese TV channel)
  - National Geographic (Scandinavian TV channel)
  - National Geographic (South Korean TV channel)
  - National Geographic Studios, formerly National Geographic Television; see National Geographic Partners

== See also ==
- National Geographic Channel (disambiguation)
