= National Geographic Channel Korea (United States) =

- Country: United States
- Broadcast area: Nationwide
- Headquarters: Los Angeles, California, United States

Programming
- Language: Korean language

Ownership
- Owner: Radio Korea Media Group (branding used under license)

History
- Launched: November 18, 2009
- Closed: October 24, 2022

Links
- Website: www.radiokorea.com/tv/ngc.php

National Geographic Channel Korea is a Korean language documentary television channel in the United States operated by Radio Korea Media Group under the license. Launched on November 18, 2009, the channel broadcasts documentary and factual films and series supplied from the National Geographic Society for most of time, either dubbed or subtitled in Korean. It also broadcasts South Korean and other Korean language productions in occasion.

On October 24, 2022, the channel ceased operations, since Radio Korea's licensing deal with the National Geographic Society was not renewed.

== See also ==
- National Geographic (South Korean TV channel): a defunct South Korean television channel directly operated by National Geographic Global Networks
