= National Geographic Channel (disambiguation) =

The National Geographic Channel is an American subscription television network of National Geographic Partners.

National Geographic may also refer to:

- National Geographic (Asian TV channel)
- National Geographic (Australian and New Zealand TV channel)
- National Geographic (British and Irish TV channel)
- National Geographic (Canadian TV channel)
- National Geographic (Dutch TV channel)
- National Geographic (French TV channel)
- National Geographic (German TV channel)
- National Geographic (Greek TV channel)
- National Geographic (Indian TV channel)
- National Geographic (Latin American TV channel)
- National Geographic (Portuguese TV channel)
- National Geographic (Scandinavian TV channel)
- National Geographic (South Korean TV channel)
- National Geographic Abu Dhabi
- Nat Geo Wild
- Nat Geo Wild (Canadian TV channel)
- National Geographic Wild (European TV channel)
- Nat Geo Music
- Nat Geo People
- Nat Geo Kids Abu Dhabi
- Nat Geo Kids (Brazilian TV channel)
- Nat Geo Kids (Latin American TV channel)
- Nat Geo Tamil
- Nat Geo Telugu
- National Geographic Farsi

== See also ==
- National Geographic (disambiguation)
