= NGNG =

NGNG may refer to:

- National Gay Newspaper Guild, an LGBT newspaper association in the USA
- No Guts No Glory (Phyno album), a 2014 album by Phyno
- nGnG, a type of amacrine cell

== See also ==
- The dictionary definition of ᇮ at Wiktionary (ngng)
- NG2 (disambiguation)
- NG (disambiguation)
