= National Geographic Kids =

Children's magazine

- Cover of the June/July 2013 issue
- Categories: Children's magazine and book
- Frequency: 10 per year
- First issue: September 1975; 50 years ago
- Company: National Geographic Partners (The Walt Disney Company)
- Country: United States
- Based in: Washington, D.C.
- Language: English
- Website: kids.nationalgeographic.com
- ISSN: 1542-3042

National Geographic Kids (often nicknamed to Nat Geo Kids) is a children's magazine published by National Geographic Partners. In a broad sense, the publication is a version of National Geographic, the publisher's flagship magazine, that is intended for children. The headquarters of the magazine is in Washington, D.C.

== History ==
In 1919, the National Geographic Society began its outreach to elementary schoolchildren with the launch of the National Geographic School Bulletin, which published weekly during the school year. In September 1975, it discontinued the Bulletin in favor of a new children's magazine, National Geographic World.

In October 2002, the advertising-free World was retitled National Geographic Kids and began accepting advertising. The first advertisers in Kids were The Walt Disney Company, Minolta, Nintendo, Scholastic Corporation, and Tony's Pizza. A spinoff, National Geographic Explorer, continues to focus on classroom use. In 2007, National Geographic Little Kids began publishing six times a year, aimed at preschoolers 3–6 years of age. In 2015, National Geographic Partners, a joint venture with 21st Century Fox, gained a controlling interest in Kids.

== Circulation ==
National Geographic Kids publishes ten issues annually. As of June 2006, the magazine reports a circulation of more than 1.3 million in English, with an estimated English language readership of more than 4.6 million. There also are eighteen editions of National Geographic Kids in different languages instead of English, published in Bulgaria, Croatia, Egypt, Germany, Greece, Hungary, Indonesia, Israel, Italy, Latin America, Lithuania, Benelux, Poland, Romania, Russia, Serbia, Slovenia, Turkey and the United Kingdom. The magazine is written for children between the ages of 6 and 14. It has an advisory board of 500 subscribers and solicits reader feedback after each issue.

Both the English and Afrikaans editions published in South Africa were converted to digital-only in June 2020. It had published in print for 16 years.

== Features ==
Cover of 1978 edition of National Geographic World, known as National Geographic Kids since 2002, featured a sculpture by Jim Gary from its lead article

These are some of the regular features, most of which appear periodically,

- Amazing Animals
- Fun Stuff (formerly called "Kids' Express")
- The Inside Scoop (formerly called "World News")
- Kids Did It!
- Go On Safari!
- What in the World? (this is one of the two features to appear in every issue)
- Video Game Central (formerly called "The Next Level")
- Weird But True (which later became a Disney+ original series, Weird But True!, and became its own book series in 2010)
- Cool Inventions
- Stupid Criminals
- Just Joking (this is the other of the two features to appear in every issue)
- Sports Funnies (comical pictures of people in sports)
- Guinness World Records
- Wildlife Watch
- Unleashed (a two-page comic series by Strika Entertainment about four house pets)
- Naughty Pets (funny photos of pets behaving badly)
- The Green List
- Bet You Didn't Know (similar to Weird But True, but issue seasonal)
- The Big Book Of Why
- Quiz Whiz

== Anniversary issues ==
The 25th anniversary issue in September 2000 was well publicized. It featured a "Top 25" list of the things readers most enjoyed (the magazine covers were #1) a collection of cards people had sent to the magazine, and a special "Kids Did It" column that featured updates on the lives of celebrities who had been featured in the magazine when they were children, such as Michelle Kwan.

The 30th anniversary issue in September 2005 featured an article describing what life might be like in thirty years (in 2035). It also featured thirty "cool things" of the future.

== Spinoffs ==
=== National Geographic Kids Almanac ===
In 2009 the magazine launched its first almanac, National Geographic Kids Almanac 2010. In 2010 the almanac continued with an updated book, National Geographic Kids Almanac 2011. There have been new updates to the almanac issued annually since then.

=== National Geographic Kids World Atlas ===
A series of world atlases has been published under the National Geographic Kids brand:

- National Geographic Kids World Atlas, 1st Ed.
- National Geographic Kids World Atlas, 2nd Ed.
- National Geographic Kids World Atlas, 3rd Ed. (2010)
- National Geographic Kids Student World Atlas, 4th Ed. (2014)
- National Geographic Kids World Atlas, 5th Ed. (2018)
- National Geographic Kids World Atlas, 6th Ed. (2021)

== Television ==
In 2017, National Geographic Partners launched the Nat Geo Kids pay television channel in Latin America and the Nat Geo Kids Abu Dhabi free-to-air satellite channel. Nat Geo Kids Abu Dhabi shut down by 2020, while the Latin American version shut down in 2022.

== See also ==
- Nat Geo Kids Abu Dhabi
- Nat Geo Kids (Latin America)
