= NG2 =

NG2 (or Ng2) may refer to:

== Places ==
- NG2 tram stop, a tram stop in the city of Nottingham, England, UK
- NG2 post code, a postal area in NG postcode area in Nottingham, England, UK

== Aerospace ==
- Blue Origin New Glenn flight 2, the second spacelaunch of the launch rocket New Glenn from Blue Origin, in November 2025
- NMG2, a satellite

== Arts, entertainment, media ==
- Ninja Gaiden II, a 2008 video game
- NG^{2} (duo), a Puerto Rican Salsa duo

== Other uses ==
- Neuron-glial antigen 2, a chondroitin sulfate proteoglycan that in humans is encoded by the CSPG4 gene

== See also ==
- NGNG (disambiguation)
- NGG (disambiguation)
- NG (disambiguation)
