= National Geographic Global Networks =

National Geographic-branded television business unit

- Formerly: National Geographic Channels Worldwide; National Geographic Channels International
- Type: Joint venture
- Industry: Television
- Products: Docuseries
- Brands: National Geographic; Nat Geo Wild
- Owners: National Geographic Partners; Disney Entertainment Television
- Divisions: National Geographic Studios

National Geographic Global Networks, formerly National Geographic Channels Worldwide and National Geographic Channels International, is a business unit within National Geographic Partners (a joint venture between the Walt Disney Company and the National Geographic Society) and the Disney Entertainment business segment of the Walt Disney Company (who handles the unit's distribution and advertising sales) that oversees the National Geographic-branded television channels and National Geographic Studios, formerly known as National Geographic Television.

The unit itself was a joint operation between 21st Century Fox and the Society, which was later integrated into National Geographic Partners; the latter was formed on 9 September 2015. On 20 March 2019, Disney acquired 21st Century Fox and thus took over its share in National Geographic Partners.

== History ==
National Geographic had moved towards launching a US cable channel in 1982, but backed out. National Geographic Television, National Geographic Society's for profit TV arm, and NBC formed a joint venture, National Geographic Channels (NGC). NGC then partnered with BSkyB to launch on September 1, 1997 National Geographic Channel services in U.K. and Ireland via BSkyB, Scandinavia via Telenor and Australia via Foxtel. At the time, Foxtel and BSkyB were then owned in some form by Rupert Murdoch with Sandy McGovern as president of NGC. The 50/50 partnership was formed to expand National Geographic Television's productions, head by Tim Kelly, that was producing National Geographic Explorer for broadcast on Nickelodeon.

The original American version of the channel was launched on January 7, 2001 with Laureen Ong as president and Andrew Wilk as head of programming. National Geographic Society took down its museum and built a TV studio. At the time, the NatGeo kept its TV production unit and got a "sweet heart" guarantee production contract of 44 hours per year at an estimated $500,000 per hour of TV. Additional National Geographic channels in other parts of the world were also launched under the original joint venture.

In 2007, Ong was replaced by David Lyle, who was moved up from the closed Fox Reality Channel, as CEO and president Howard Owens. In 2010, the company launched Nat Geo Wild channel in the US to go up against competitor Discovery Channel. Ratings dropped as a whole and Lyle and Owens left in 2014. Courtney Monroe moved up from her head marketing post to take over NGC US.

On 9 September 2015, the Society announced that it would reorganize its media properties and publications into a new company known as National Geographic Partners, which would be 73% owned by 21st Century Fox. This for-profit company would own National Geographic and other magazines, as well as its affiliated television channels — most of which were already owned in joint ventures with Fox. On 26 October 2016, National Geographic Channel announced the removal of the word "Channel" from its name.

== Brands ==
=== Current ===
- National Geographic: The flagship television channel of the group which broadcasts documentaries on various subjects, as well as docu-reality shows.
- Nat Geo Wild: It is a sister channel to the flagship National Geographic television channel that focuses on animal-related wildlife and natural history programming.
- Nat Geo People: Targeted at female audiences, the channel's programming focuses on people and cultures. Currently available in Poland.

=== Former ===
- National Geographic Adventure: Launched as Adventure One (abbr. A1), it was aimed at younger audiences, providing programming based around outdoor adventure, travel and stories involving people exploring the world.
- Nat Geo Music: A channel that focuses on ethnic music.
- Nat Geo Kids Latin America: A children's interest channel.
- Nat Geo Kids Abu Dhabi: A children's interest channel channel.

== Channels by region ==
All of National Geographic-branded television channels are operated as a part of this unit's business. The Society provides most of programming on the channels, while Disney Entertainment units handle distribution and advertisement sales of the channels. In most cases internationally, the National Geographic and Disney channels cross-promote each other. In some territories like Japan, the versions of National Geographic channels are directly operated by Disney.

=== Current ===
==== Americas ====
===== Anglo-America =====
United States

- National Geographic
- National Geographic Wild
- Nat Geo Mundo (Spanish language programming)

Canada
The following channels in Canada are operated by Corus Entertainment under license.

- National Geographic
- National Geographic Wild

===== Latin America =====
Spanish-speaking countries

- National Geographic (with sub-regional versions for Mexico, Colombia, Central America [which also covers Caribbean islands], Pacific [Chile, Peru, Ecuador and Bolivia], and Atlantic [Argentina, Paraguay and Uruguay])

==== Asia ====
NGC Network Asia, LLC operates all of National Geographic-branded television channels across Asia except India and Japan.

NGC Network Asia previously represented television channels from Fox International Channels (FIC) in the region, but they were transferred to the newly formed Asian branch of FIC in the 2009 reorganization of Star TV.

The Asian operations also oversee National Geographic TV channels in the Middle East and North Africa (except Israel).

Middle East and North Africa

- National Geographic MENA (in English)
- National Geographic Abu Dhabi (in Arabic)
- Nat Geo Wild

India
JioStar handles channel distribution and advertisement sales in this country.

- National Geographic India (in English, Hindi, Tamil and Telugu)
- Nat Geo Wild

Japan
The following channels in Japan are operated by Walt Disney Japan.

- National Geographic Japan (in Japanese)

==== Europe ====
The European operations also oversee National Geographic TV channels in Israel, Australia and New Zealand. It is also responsible for the channels in Sub-Saharan Africa.

Balkans

- National Geographic Serbia
- National Geographic Wild

Czech Republic and Slovakia

- National Geographic Czechia
- National Geographic Wild

France

- National Geographic
- National Geographic Wild

Ukraine

- National Geographic Ukraine
- National Geographic Wild

Greece

- National Geographic
- National Geographic Wild

Netherlands and Belgium

- National Geographic
- National Geographic Wild

Poland

- National Geographic Poland
- National Geographic Wild
- Nat Geo People

Portugal

- National Geographic
- National Geographic Wild

Romania

- National Geographic Romania
- National Geographic Wild

Nordic and Scandinavia

- Nat Geo People
- National Geographic

United Kingdom and Ireland

- National Geographic
- National Geographic Wild

Spain

- National Geographic Spain
- National Geographic Wild

Sub-Saharan Africa

- National Geographic Africa
- National Geographic Wild
- Nat Geo Gold

Israel

- National Geographic Israel
- National Geographic Wild

Germany

- National Geographic
- National Geographic Wild

=== Former ===
India

- National Geographic Tamil
- National Geographic Telugu
- Nat Geo People
- Nat Geo Music

Italy

- National Geographic Italia
- National Geographic Wild
- Nat Geo People
- Nat Geo Music

Japan

- Nat Geo Wild (in Japanese)
- Nat Geo Music

Latin America
Spanish-speaking countries

- Nat Geo Wild
- Nat Geo Music
- Nat Geo & Fox HD
- Nat Geo Kids

Brazil

- National Geographic Brazil
- Nat Geo Wild
- Nat Geo Music
- Nat Geo & Fox HD
- Nat Geo Kids

Middle East and North Africa

- Nat Geo Kids Abu Dhabi
- Nat Geo People

Russia and Belarus

- National Geographic Russia
- Nat Geo Wild
- Nat Geo People
- Nat Geo Music

Australia and New Zealand

- National Geographic
- Nat Geo Wild
- Nat Geo People
- Nat Geo Music

Southeast Asia, Hong Kong, Taiwan and South Korea

- National Geographic
- National Geographic South Korea
- Nat Geo Wild
- Nat Geo People
- Nat Geo Music

Nordic and Scandinavia

- Nat Geo Wild

Romania

- Nat Geo People
