= Nat Geo Kids Abu Dhabi =

Emirati television channel

- Country: United Arab Emirates
- Broadcast area: Arab world
- Headquarters: Abu Dhabi, United Arab Emirates

Programming
- Language: Arabic
- Picture format: 1080i HDTV (downscaled to 16:9 576i for the SDTV feed)

Ownership
- Owner: National Geographic Society/The Walt Disney Company EMEA (Disney International Content and Operations); Abu Dhabi Media Company
- Sister channels: National Geographic; Nat Geo Wild; Nat Geo People; Drama

History
- Launched: 20 November 2017; 8 years ago
- Closed: 1 January 2020; 6 years ago
- Replaced by: Disney Junior (most of its content)

Links
- Website: natgeotv.com/me/page/natgeokidsabudhabi

Nat Geo Kids Abu Dhabi was an Emirati free-to-air Arabic language documentary channel for children, owned by National Geographic Society/The Walt Disney Company EMEA (Disney International Content and Operations) and the Abu Dhabi Media Foundation. Launched on 20 November 2017, the channel was freely available through Nilesat. The channel also dealt with scientific, geographic and natural science documentaries.

== Shutdown ==
The channel was shut down on 1 January 2020, with a short notice in Arabic that was published on the channel's website. The text reads as follows:

The National Geographic Abu Dhabi Kids channel will no longer air from 1 January 2020. We want to thank all of you who have enjoyed our channel for your support and hope you continue to connect with our content on our National Geographic Abu Dhabi Kids YouTube page and through Nat Geo Abu Dhabi Channel.

After the channel was shut down, its official and social media sites remained active online for a short time, after which, its social media sites were removed and the official website went down and its programming were moved to Disney Junior.

== See also ==
- National Geographic Kids
