= NGG =

NGG may refer to:

- Food, Beverages and Catering Union (German: Gewerkschaft Nahrung-Genuss-Gaststätten), a trade union in Germany
- New Great Game
- the National Government of Georgia, The Democratic Republic of Georgia in-exile
