= Nat Geo Music =

TV channel

Programming
- Picture format: 576i (16:9 SDTV); 1080i (HDTV)

Ownership
- Owner: National Geographic Partners (Walt Disney Television)

History
- Launched: 14 October 2007; 18 years ago
- Closed: 2017; 9 years ago (global except India); 20 June 2019; 7 years ago (India)

Nat Geo Music was a television music channel operated as a part of National Geographic Global Networks, which is a business unit of National Geographic Partners (a joint venture between The Walt Disney Company and the National Geographic Society). The channel works in conjunction with the Society's music division National Geographic Music and Radio (NGMR).

== Launch and availability ==
C21 reported in July 2007 that National Geographic Channels International (NGCI; now National Geographic Global Networks) would launch a Nat Geo Music channel in October in Italy before a staged roll out across Europe.

In mid-August 2007, NGCI confirmed the channel and its Italy launch date of 15 October 2007 on Sky. NGCI has arranged for music from the following labels: EMI Arabia, Sony/BMG Asia, Warner Music Latin America and Universal Italy, for the channel. The channel was launched in Latin America in the fourth quarter 2008. The Saturday before March 3, 2009, the channel and Nat Geo Wild was launched in Portugal on the Cabovisão and Meo platforms.

Nat Geo Music was slated to be launched in 2008 with three other Nat Geo channels in India. Fox International Channels launched in 2010 the new Nat Geo channels again along with three other Fox channels On 1 February 2010, Nat Geo Music and two channels from Fox debuted on Singaporean cable TV provider StarHub. As of 2017 it has ceased operartions globally and as of 20 June 2019 in India. The last program being to air was the band Young Guns with music video "Stitches" by Gustav Wood.

== Content ==
Previously, Nat Geo Music aired documentaries regarding 'culture and music' around the world, later they began to play music around on Airtel Digital TV on LCN 505 SD and 506 HD.the clock without channel identification, promos and advertisements (though it plays the same music then).

== See also ==
- National Geographic Channel
