= Worldwide Retail Store =

Holding company based in Madrid, Spain

- Company type: Holding company
- Founded: 2006
- Headquarters: Madrid, Spain

Worldwide Retail Store S.L. (WRS) is a Spanish holding company founded in 2006 and based in Madrid.

Previously, WRS had stores in Madrid, London, Singapore, and franchised airport stores in Panama, Sydney, and Dublin.
