= National Geographic Partners =

American media company

National Geographic Partners, LLC
- Type: Joint venture
- Founded: September 9, 2015; 11 years ago
- Headquarters: 1145 17th St NW, Washington, DC 20036, United States
- Area served: Worldwide
- Brands: National Geographic magazine; National Geographic Kids; National Geographic TV; Nat Geo Music; Nat Geo Wild; Nat Geo People; Nat Geo Maps; Under the Stars
- Owners: The Walt Disney Company (73%, 2019–present); National Geographic Society (27%)
- Divisions: National Geographic Global Networks (JV with Disney Entertainment Television); NG Media; National Geographic Travel and Tours; National Geographic Maps
- Website: National Geographic Partner Information

National Geographic Partners, LLC is a joint venture between the Walt Disney Company (which owns 73% of the company) and the namesake non-profit scientific organization National Geographic Society (which owns 27%). Headquartered in Washington, DC, the company oversees all commercial activities related to the Society, including magazine publications and television channels. The company's board of managers is evenly divided between the Society and Disney.

The enterprise was originally established by 21st Century Fox and the National Geographic Society. Following the completion of Disney's acquisition of 21st Century Fox on March 20, 2019, Disney assumed 21CF's 73% share in the joint venture.

== Background ==
National Geographic Society's relationship with 21st Century Fox goes as far back as 1997, when the original News Corporation (to which 21st Century Fox is one of the successors) launched National Geographic Channel (now simply branded as National Geographic) in Asia and Europe, in partnership with the Society. The original American version of the channel was launched in 2001. Additional National Geographic channels in other parts of the world were also launched under the original joint venture.

== History ==
On September 9, 2015, the Society announced that it would reorganize its media properties and publications into a new company known as National Geographic Partners, which would be 73% owned by 21st Century Fox. This new, for-profit, corporation would own National Geographic and other magazines, as well as its affiliated television networks—most of which were already owned in joint ventures with Fox. At the time of the deal's announcement, James Murdoch, the CEO of 21st Century Fox, said in remarks to National Geographic that the pact created "an expanded canvas for the National Geographic brand to grow and reach customers in new ways, and to reach new customers." On November 2, 2015, roughly two weeks before the closing of the expanded joint venture deal, National Geographic and 21st Century Fox announced that 9 percent of National Geographic's 2,000 employees, approximately 180 people, would be laid off, constituting the biggest staff reduction in the Society's history. In November 2015, National Geographic Channels International CEO Ward Platt was promoted to National Geographic Partners, while the channel international and US were united under National Geographic Channels U.S. CEO Courteney Monroe as National Geographic Global Networks.

National Geographic Networks announced the production of four feature documentaries and reentry of NatGeo back into documentaries. Soon thereafter in January 2017, the network announced National Geographic Documentary Films banner for the four features.

In May 2017, the company acquired Global Adrenaline tour operator, a provider of National Geographic Expeditions for some of its land-based itineraries, which was founded in 2001 by CEO Nancy Schumacher.

In New York City in October 2017, the National Geographic Encounter: Ocean Odyssey attraction opened by SPE Partners under license. SPE brought on Falcon's Creative Group, Pixomondo, Mirada Studios, and composer David Kahne for the attraction's creative aspects. Ocean Odyssey was 90 minutes timed ticketed walk-through attraction with retail space plus private event space managed by the Shubert Organization. The attraction had closed by 2021.

Declan Moore was succeeded by Gary E. Knell as CEO of Nat Geo Partners in February 2018. In July, Moore reorganized the company including eliminating three top executive posts. Global network CEO would oversee a combine long and short form production company, National Geographic Studios. NG Media, as a one newsroom for content on all platforms, was formed bring digital, magazines and other short form content together. CFO Marcela Martin added the chief administrative officer (CAO) post leading the new Operating Council coordinating support functions.

National Geographic Kids Books launched its fiction imprint, Under the Stars, in September 2018. A partnership with Ultimate Explorer, a Chinese company, was made for interactive entertainment spaces based on the series in China and the U.S. With its second series published in October 2019, the kids book unit launched a companion podcast.

As a part of the acquisition of most 21st Century Fox assets, the Walt Disney Company took over 21CF's controlling stake in the joint venture. Following the acquisition, National Geographic Partners' television channels became part of the Walt Disney Television unit, with the president of the National Geographic Partners reporting directly to the Walt Disney Television chairman. Disney officially closed the deal on March 20, 2019. By August 2019, National Geographic Partners' non-TV operations were transferred into its Disney counterpart.

== Businesses ==
=== NG Media ===
NG Media is the publishing arm of the partnership and operates within Disney Publishing Worldwide handling National Geographic's magazines, digital, social channels, Nat Geo Kids, book publishing and live events.

National Geographic Adventure was launched in March 1999. The society's magazine group discontinued its Adventure magazine in December 2009 while attempting to continue the brand in other media like books and online.

While under development since 2014, National Geographic Kids Books launched its fiction imprint, Under the Stars, in September 2018 with the publication of Explorer Academy: The Nebula Secret, first of a seven-part series written by Trudi Trueit. The imprint refers to large domed lobby painted with the night sky at the society's headquarters. A partnership with Ultimate Explorer, a Chinese company, was made for interactive entertainment spaces based on the series in China and the U.S. With its second series, Zeus the Mighty, published in October 2019, the kids book unit launched a companion podcast, Greeking Out, with Kids Place Live.

NG Media was formed in February 2018 reorganization bring together as a one newsroom for content on all platforms. National Geographic Editor-in-chief was name editor director of NG Media with David Miller, general manager of ditigal, became general manager of NG Media overseeing subscriptions and membership plus NG Creative, Maps and Photography units.

Disney transferred NG Media into Disney Publishing Worldwide by August 2019. NG Media also discontinued Traveler magazine's US edition.

Magazines published by NG Media:

- National Geographic: The flagship, monthly magazine. The magazine contains articles about geography, popular science, world history, culture, current events and photography of places and things all over the world and universe. National Geographic magazine is currently published in 40 local-language editions in many countries around the world. Combined English and other language circulation is around 6.8 million monthly, with some 60 million readers.
- National Geographic Explorer: Classroom magazine. The National Geographic School Bulletin was launched in 1919 and was replaced by the children's magazine National Geographic World in 1975. NG World was separated into the current National Geographic Explorer and National Geographic Kids in 2001.
- National Geographic History: Launched in Spring 2015.
- National Geographic Kids: A version of National Geographic Magazine for children, launched in 1975 under the name National Geographic World. It has a U.S. circulation of over 1.5 million. There are also currently 18 local-language editions of NG Kids, with another half million in circulation. An Arabic edition of the children's magazine was launched in Egypt in early 2007, and more than 42,000 copies are distributed to all the public schools in Egypt, in addition to another 15,000 single copy sales. More recently, an Albanian and Polish edition were launched.
- National Geographic Little Kids: For younger children aged 3–6
- National Geographic Traveler: Launched in 1984. There are 18 local-language editions of NG Traveler.
- National Geographic Adventure (1998-2009) eight issue per year, had a subscription base of 625,000

National Geographic Books: a nonfiction book publisher

- National Geographic Kids Books division
  - Under the Stars fiction imprint

=== Television ===
The National Geographic-branded television channels and TV production company are operated as a part of this venture, but Disney's companies (Disney Entertainment Television in the United States and Disney's international units outside the United States) handle distribution and advertisement sales of the channels. In most cases internationally, the National Geographic and Disney channel's cross-promote each other. In some territories, the versions of National Geographic channels are directly operated by Disney.

- National Geographic: The flagship documentary channel.
- National Geographic Studios (formerly known as National Geographic Television)
- Nat Geo Kids: A children's interest channel.
- Nat Geo Music: A channel that focused on ethnic music. Closed in 2019.
- Nat Geo People: A lifestyle-centered channel.
- Nat Geo Wild: A wildlife-themed channel.
- Nat Geo Gold: A documentary-themed channel. Currently available in the Africa region.

=== National Geographic Travel ===
National Geographic Travel is the travel and tour division of National Geographic Partners offering National Geographic tours through various third-party partners and its internal tour operator.

National Geographic Expeditions was founded in 1999 by the National Geographic Society to fulfill one of its missions and for the proceeds to go towards its mission. In 2004, the division made a partnership with Lindblad Expeditions cruise line and white label tour operator, Global Adrenaline.

In September 2013, National Geographic Society formed the National Geographic Travel group by bringing its travel assets together including National Geographic Traveler magazine, National Geographic Expeditions, its travel books, digital travel content, maps, apps and travel community. Keith Bellows, editor-in-chief of National Geographic Traveler, was named senior vice president of the group. Bellows was the editor-in-chief until October 2014. With the appointment of his permanent replacement.

A hotel marketing collection, National Geographic Unique Lodges of the World, and a new independent travel planning division, Private Expeditions, were launched in January 2015. Private Expeditions incorporate in most cases one of these lodges. The initial 24 boutique hotels met collection standards for sustainability, guest experience, and property quality. Nat Geo Travel was moved in September 2015 into a joint venture, National Geographic Partners, with 21st Century Fox.

In May 2017, National Geographic Partners purchased Global Adrenaline. With Lindblad, their agreement was expanded to include new destinations in Latin America and Canada, while bringing in additional luxury expedition line partners Compagnie du Ponant and Scenic Luxury Cruises & Tours. Disney migrated National Geographic Travel operations into Disney Signature Experiences by August 2019.

Type	Brand	Partner	Time period
Small ship cruise line (NA, LA, CA)	Lindblad Expeditions-National Geographic	Lindblad Expeditions	2004–
Tour operator	National Geographic Expeditions	Global Adrenaline (purchased)	2004–2017
Private jet vacations	National Geographic Expeditions	TCS World Travel	
Land tour	National Geographic Journeys	G Adventures	
Luxury expedition line (NZ, AU, Pacific)		Ponant	2018–
River cruising	National Geographic River Cruise	Scenic Luxury Cruises & Tours	2018–
Hotel collection	National Geographic Unique Lodges of the World	various hotels	2015–
Private travel tours	Private Expeditions	Virtuoso	2015–

=== National Geographic Maps ===
National Geographic Maps is the commercial map publishing division of National Geographic Partners, within Disney Publishing Worldwide.

== Awards ==
In 2019, National Geographic's documentary Free Solo won Best Documentary Feature at the 91st Academy Awards, and won the BAFTA Award for Best Documentary at the 72nd British Academy Film Awards. The film was the second-highest grossing documentary of 2018.
