= National Geographic (South Korean TV channel) =

- Country: South Korea
- Headquarters: Seoul

Ownership
- Owner: National Geographic Global Networks (National Geographic Partners)

History
- Launched: 2 February 2004
- Replaced: National Geographic Channel (Asia)
- Closed: 31 December 2019
- Replaced by: National Geographic (Southeast Asia)
- Former names: National Geographic Channel

National Geographic (formerly National Geographic Channel) was a South Korean documentary television channel operated by the Asian operations of National Geographic Global Networks (a part of National Geographic Partners, which is, as of March 2019, a joint venture between the National Geographic Society and The Walt Disney Company). The channel broadcast non-fiction television programmes, with most of shows coming from the National Geographic Society.

Prior to the launch of NGC in South Korea, video documentaries produced by National Geographic Society were broadcast on the terrestrial TV channels. Previously, a Pan-Asian version was available to South Korean viewers. However, it was replaced by a dedicated local version broadcast from Seoul in February 2004.

While the channel drew most of programmes from the National Geographic Society, it also broadcast a percentage of South Korean productions as South Korean regulations on television channels mandated to do so.

The pan-Asian version of Nat Geo Wild and Nat Geo People television channels are available in South Korea, and have served as a companion to this channel for many years; certain programmes were also shown on National Geographic South Korea.

In December 2019, National Geographic notified that the channel would cease transmission on 31 December 2019, and would be replaced by the network's Southeast Asia feed the next day.

== See also ==
- National Geographic Society
- National Geographic (magazine)
- National Geographic Global Networks
