= Ng =

Ng, ng, or NG may refer to:

- Ng (name) (吳 黄 伍), (吳 being the most common), a surname of Chinese origin

== Arts and entertainment ==
- N-Gage (device), a handheld gaming system
- Naked Giants, Seattle rock band
- Spirit Hunter: NG, a video game

== Businesses and organizations ==
- Lauda Air (airline code NG)
- National Geographic (disambiguation)
- National Grid plc, a British multinational electricity and gas utility company
- National Guard (disambiguation)
- Nederlandse Gidsen (Dutch Guides), one of the Scouting organisations that evolved into the national Scouting organisation of the Netherlands
- Newgrounds, an American entertainment and social media website and company
- Northrop Grumman Corporation, a major United States defense contractor
- Notgemeinschaft der Deutschen Wissenschaft, a German scientific society
- Network General, a defunct American networking company

== Language ==
- Ndonga dialect (ISO 639 alpha-2 ng), a dialect of Oshiwambo
- Ng (digraph), a pair of letters representing various sounds
- Ng (Arabic letter)
- Ng (Filipino letter)
- Eng (letter) (Ŋ ŋ)
- Cyrillic characters:
  - En with descender (Cyrillic) (Ң ң)
  - En with hook (Ӈ ӈ)
  - En-ghe (Cyrillic) (Ҥ ҥ)
  - En with middle hook (Ԣ ԣ)
- Voiced velar nasal, /ŋ/ in International Phonetic Alphabet
- Emoji character 🆖 (Unicode U+1F196) used in Japan for "no good" (originally referring to bloopers shown during or after Japanese live TV shows)

== People ==
- N'golo Kante, sometimes known as NG by fans, French football player

== Places ==
- Nigeria (ISO country code NG)
  - .ng the Internet country code top-level domain (ccTLD) for Nigeria
- Niger (FIPS country code NG)
- NG postcode area, that covers most of Nottinghamshire, England

== Science and technology ==
- Nitroglycerin
- Nanogram (ng)
- Natural gas
- Nasogastric (NG), pertaining both to the nose and to the stomach (e.g. see nasogastric intubation)
- Noble gas (placeholder symbol Ng)
- Software (-package) suffixed with -ng, (as next generation) to distinguish between newer or expanded implementations (e.g. Util-linux-ng or Syslog-ng)
- Angular, a leading web application framework

== Other uses ==
- A blooper (a no good cut) in East Asian variants of English
- A no good (forbidden) word in the "NG word game"
- The Nederduits Gereformeerde Kerk (Dutch Reformed Church), a church in South Africa

== See also ==
- Next Generation (disambiguation)
- No Good (disambiguation)
