= National Geographic Society Headquarters =

Historic office complex in Washington, D.C., US

- U.S. National Register of Historic Places
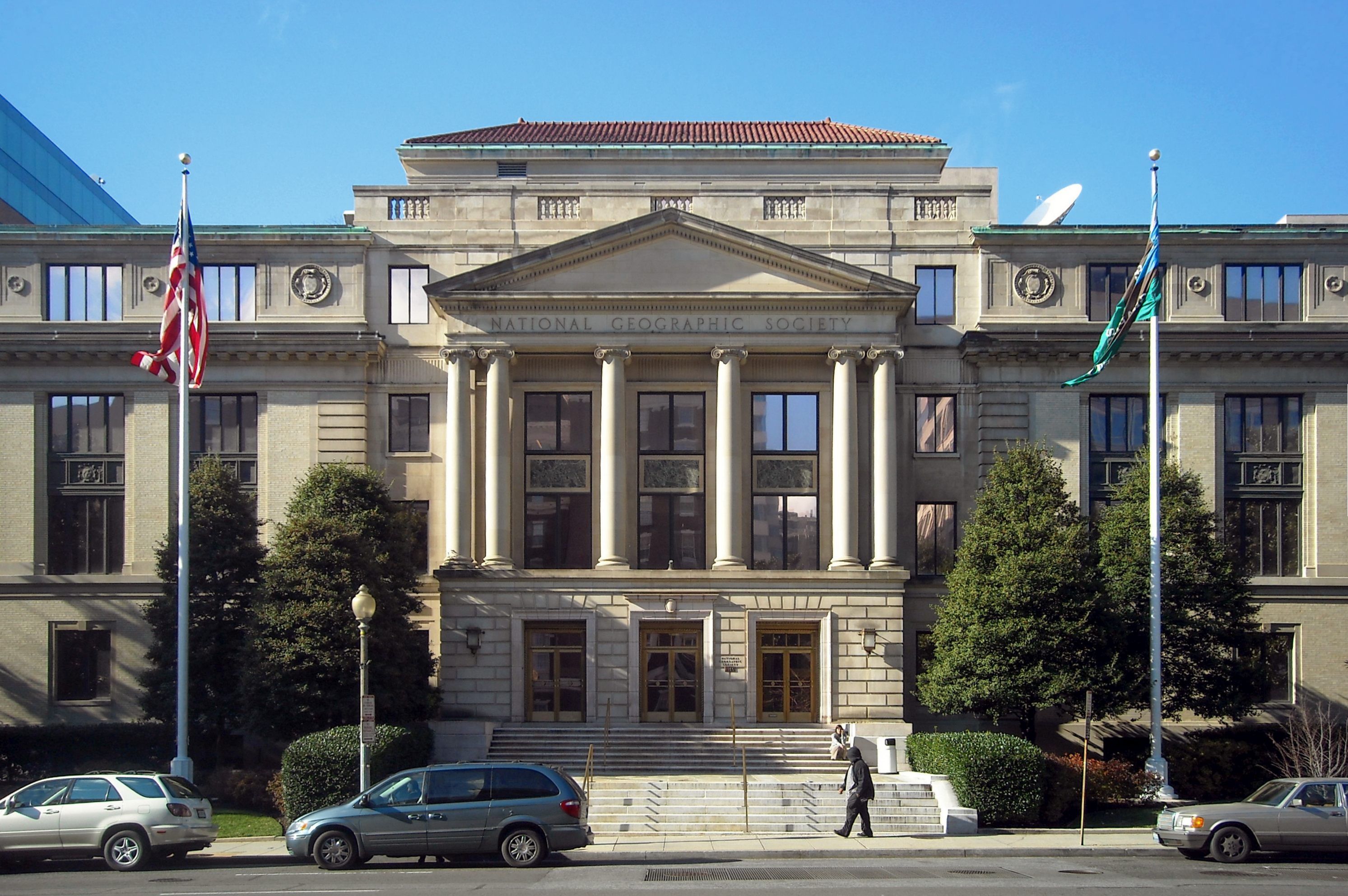
- 16th Street Administration Building in 2009

- Location within District of Columbia
- Location: 1156 16th Street, NW and 1145 17th Street, NW, Washington, D.C.
- Coordinates: 38°54′19″N 77°02′13″W
- Area: 2.85 acres (1.15 ha)
- Built: 1904; 1912–13, 1931; 1963–64
- Architect: Hornblower & Marshall, Arthur B. Heaton, Edward Durell Stone
- Architectural style: Italian Renaissance, Neoclassical, New Formalism
- NRHP reference No.: 100009025
- Added to NRHP: June 5, 2023

The National Geographic Society Headquarters is a historic complex of buildings in Washington, D.C., United States. The complex was constructed in phases beginning in 1904 to house the offices and museum of the National Geographic Society, a scientific and educational nonprofit institution that has been headquartered in Washington since its 1888 founding. The historical portion of the site consists of three buildings: the 1904 original structure Hubbard Hall, the adjoining Administration Building, of which the north wing was constructed during 1912–1913, and the south wing and central pavilion in 1932; and the 1963–1964 Stone Building. A fourth building constructed in 1984 is too modern to be considered a contributing structure to the historical segment of the complex.

The National Geographic Society developed over time from a handful of Washington-area scientists into a substantial, internationally respected institution. The group's headquarters grew along with the society, with the progressively larger buildings eventually occupying an entire half of a city block. Their architectural styles evolved over time as well. All were designed by notable architects, and the 1963–64 Stone Building by Edward Durell Stone in particular is considered a quality example of the New Formalism style.

The complex was listed on the National Register of Historic Places in 2023. Hubbard Hall and the Administration Building had previously been listed on the register as contributing structures to the Sixteenth Street Historic District. The site is also listed on the District of Columbia Inventory of Historic Sites. As of 2025, the society still used the complex for its headquarters and was constructing a 2026 expansion on the site.

== Location ==
The site comprises four buildings occupying the northern half of a long city block in central Washington, D.C., north of the White House. The eastern and western boundaries of the complex are 16th Street NW and 17th Street NW, respectively, while the northern boundary is formed by M Street and the southern by an alley bisecting the block. The original headquarters structure, Hubbard Hall, is located on the northeastern corner of the block with its main entrance facing 16th Street. The Administration Building, which also faces 16th Street, was constructed just south of Hubbard Hall and extends south to the alley. The Stone Building was built along 17th Street and changed the site's primary orientation by having its main entrance open on that roadway. The complex's fourth building, constructed after the site's period of historical significance, was built on the site between the older three structures. All four buildings are connected, either above or underground.

== History ==
=== Establishment and first headquarters ===
The National Geographic Society (NGS) held its first meeting in January 1888 at the Cosmos Club, a private D.C. gentlemen's club aimed at "the advancement of its members in science, literature, and art". The society itself stated in its bylaws the goal of achieving the "increase and diffusion of geographic knowledge". The group began with 33 members, many of whom were not scientists, including co-founder and first society president Gardiner Greene Hubbard. Hubbard, a lawyer and recent transplant from Boston at the time of his election, led the group until his death in 1897.

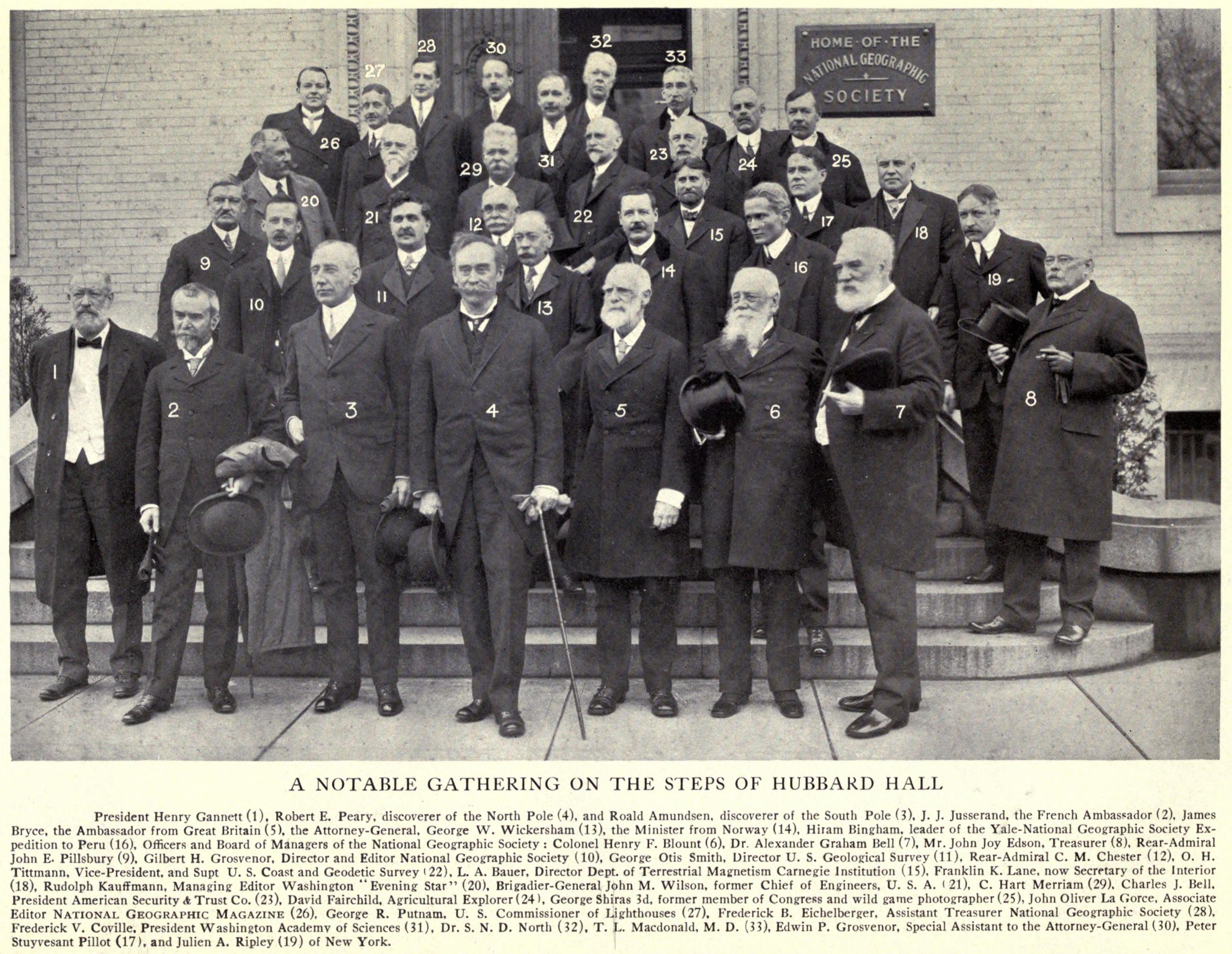
A gathering on the front steps of Hubbard Hall. The group includes Roald Amundsen (marked #3 on the photo), Robert Peary (#4), Alexander Graham Bell (#7), and NGS director Gilbert H. Grosvenor (#10)

Hubbard was succeeded as president by Alexander Graham Bell. The inventor had married Hubbard's daughter Mabel while the two were in Boston, and Bell had been involved with the society since its early days. Under Bell's leadership the NGS sought to become more populist. The group had begun issuing a monthly magazine in 1896, but its contents were highly technical – an early article was titled "The Classification of Geographic Forms by Genesis" – and readership suffered. Bell hired the organization's first full-time employee, Gilbert H. Grosvenor, to take over as editor-in-chief of the magazine. At Bell's direction, Grosvenor targeted a more general audience – partly by greatly increasing the amount of photography – while attempting not to, in Grosvenor's words, "lower the dignity of the Society".

Bell and Grosvenor's changes were largely successful, and by 1900 the society's membership of roughly 2,700 was considered one of the highest of any of the world's scientific organizations. In that year Hubbard's heirs announced that they had purchased a site at the corner of 16th and M Streets for the purpose of establishing a headquarters for the society and as a memorial to its founder. Originally expected to cost $40,000 (equivalent to $1.2 million in 2024), the building was planned to have office space for the society and its magazine as well as a lecture hall for the group's smaller, more technical presentations (their more popular lectures were being held at that time at a local church).

Following a bidding process, the architectural firm of Hornblower & Marshall was chosen to design the new building, termed Hubbard Memorial Hall. Mabel Bell was heavily involved with the planning process and had considerable influence over its final design. The structure's cornerstone was laid in April 1902 and contains a box of documents concerning Hubbard's career and accomplishments. The two-story building, which eventually cost over $75,000 to construct, was sufficiently completed by October 1903 for its first floor offices to be occupied by the society's magazine, though a formal opening ceremony was not held until March the following year. Prior to that reception, Bell hosted a dinner in honor of W.J. McGee, who was succeeding him as president. Bell remained on the group's board of trustees and contributed regularly to its magazine until dying in 1922.

=== Two-part expansion ===
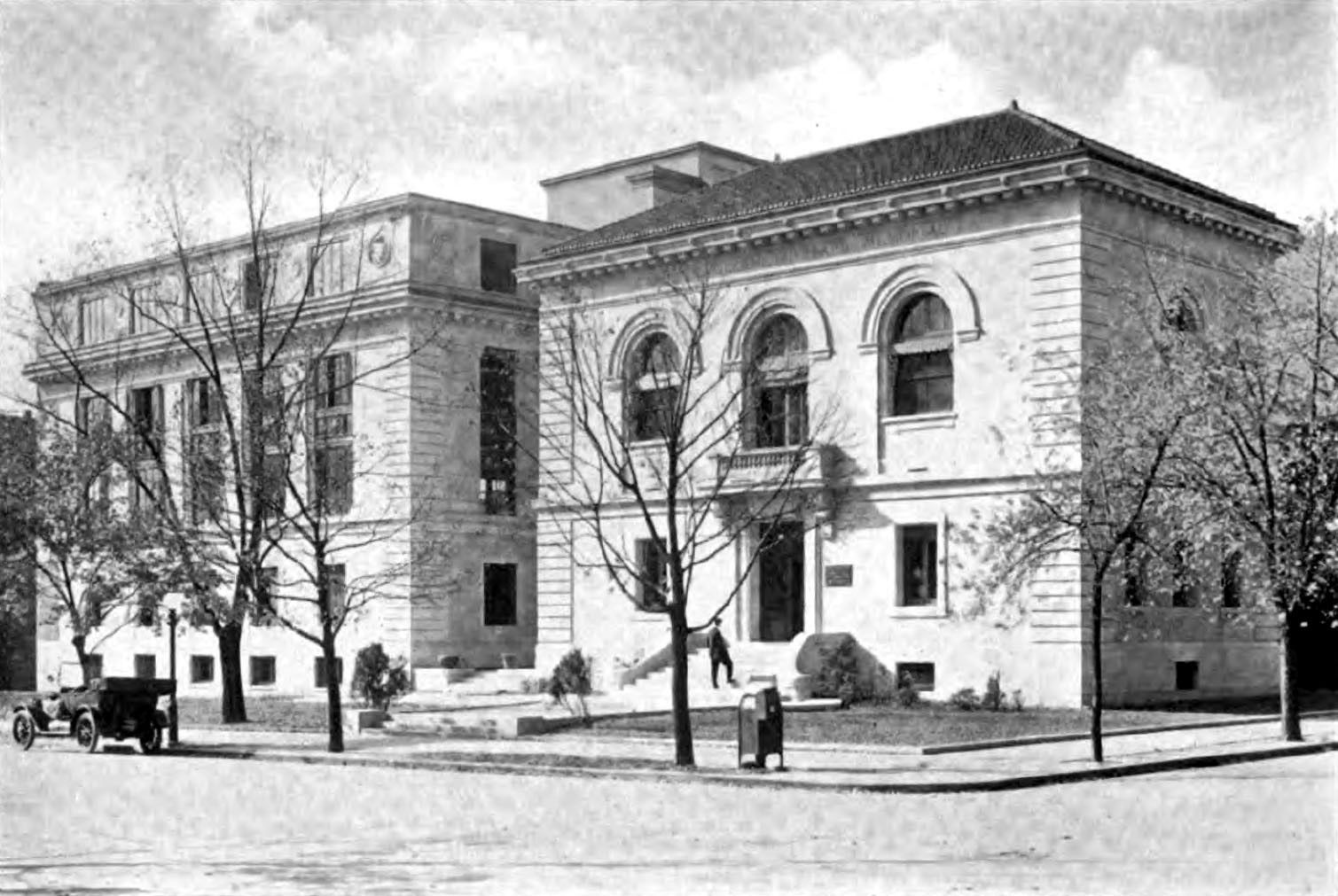
Hubbard Hall and the 1913 annex, prior to the completion of the Administration Building

Membership in the NGS surpassed 100,000 in 1911, with the group adding 30,000 new members in that year alone, and by 1913 the society was using two branch offices in D.C. to house the clerks necessary to manage its rapid growth. In December 1912, the group's board of managers approved an expansion of its headquarters. They hired Arthur B. Heaton to design a new building, which would technically be an annex as it was to be connected to Hubbard Hall via a hyphen. Completed in October 1913 at a cost of $150,000, the new structure stretched 80 feet (24 m) on 16th Street and 90 feet (27 m) to the rear. The building contained clerical and office space as well as a cafeteria, and included a large third-floor office for Grosvenor, by then the institution's director.

As early as 1914, it was planned that the NGS would expand even further south on 16th Street. In that year they purchased an additional 137 feet (42 m) of frontage on the road with the eventual goal of constructing a 3,000-seat auditorium. By 1915 Heaton had drawn plans for the building, which was to turn the 1913 annex into the northern wing of a two-wing structure, with the southern wing to be designed in a complementary but slightly varied style. An illustrated depiction from the time shows the building topped by a massive tower that would "serve as a central landmark on 16th street". It was 1932, however, before any expansion on the site was completed, and both the tower and auditorium were gone from the final design.

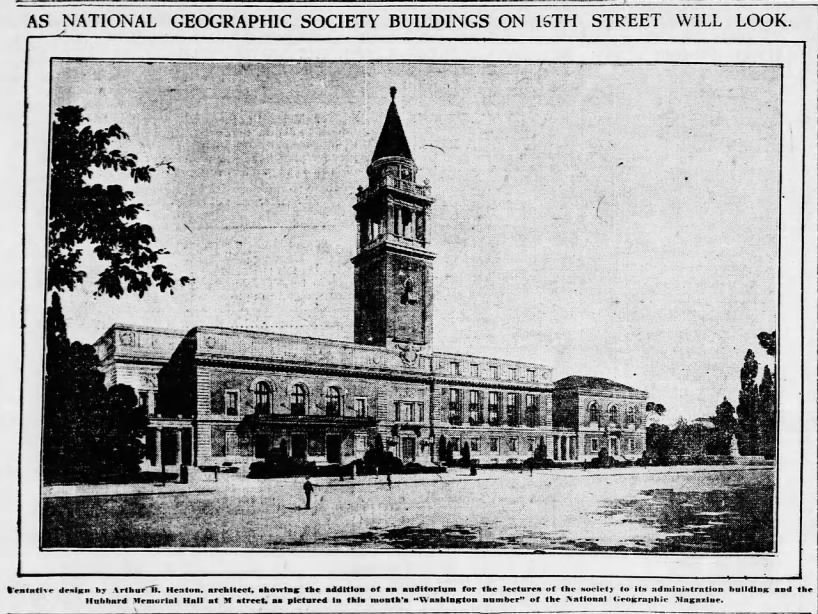
An artist's depiction of the planned Administration Building expansion

With its membership up to 1.25 million, the NGS announced its 16th Street expansion in April 1931. Heaton was retained again along with the same builders who constructed the 1913 annex, and it was decided for the new construction to mirror that of 1913. The new construction would become the southern wing and central pavilion of the Administration Building, with the 1913 building becoming its northern wing. Upon its completion it was announced that the society's scientific collections would be kept in the new structure, along with fireproof vaults housing the group's 300,000 photographs of the world's geography, reportedly the largest collection in the world at the time. The magazine's editorial offices were to be moved to the building as well. The organization later established an exhibition space in the building called Explorers Hall. The hall, which was free and open to the public during the week, housed a sampling of the group's holdings as well as occasional special exhibits.

=== Stone Building and beyond ===
The society's membership continued to grow through the middle of the 20th century, and by the time of Grosvenor's 1954 retirement was up to 2.15 million. In 1959 the group announced its intention to expand its headquarters again, this time by demolishing Hubbard Hall and building a new, seven-story building in its place. A legal hitch concerning a 1905 transfer of ownership required the society to get court approval to raze Hubbard Hall, which they were successful in attaining. In March 1960, however, the NGS spent $1 million to purchase a four-story structure located at M and 17th Streets, behind its existing headquarters, and in June they announced that the new headquarters building would be located there and Hubbard Hall would remain standing.

The NGS hired the architect Edward Durell Stone to design their new building. Stone worked in the New Formalism style, but intended for his design to meld with both the other NGS structures on the site and with Washington as a whole. In his 1962 memoir The Evolution of an Architect, he wrote, "Since the Society is a national institution, it was felt that the building should reflect the dignity of official Washington." Originally planned as eleven stories and anticipated to cost $5 million, the completed building stood ten stories tall and cost nearly double the initial estimate. Construction began in April 1961 and the finished structure was dedicated in January 1964. President Lyndon B. Johnson spoke at the dedication ceremony and said of the new building, "This imposing home stands not as a monument to the past but as a testament of confidence in—and enthusiasm for—the future." Following the dedication, The New York Times said that "many regard the [Stone Building] as the most distinguished example of modern architecture in Washington". The building was Stone's first contribution to the architecture of Washington; the 1971 Kennedy Center for the Performing Arts on F Street was one of the architect's final major projects.

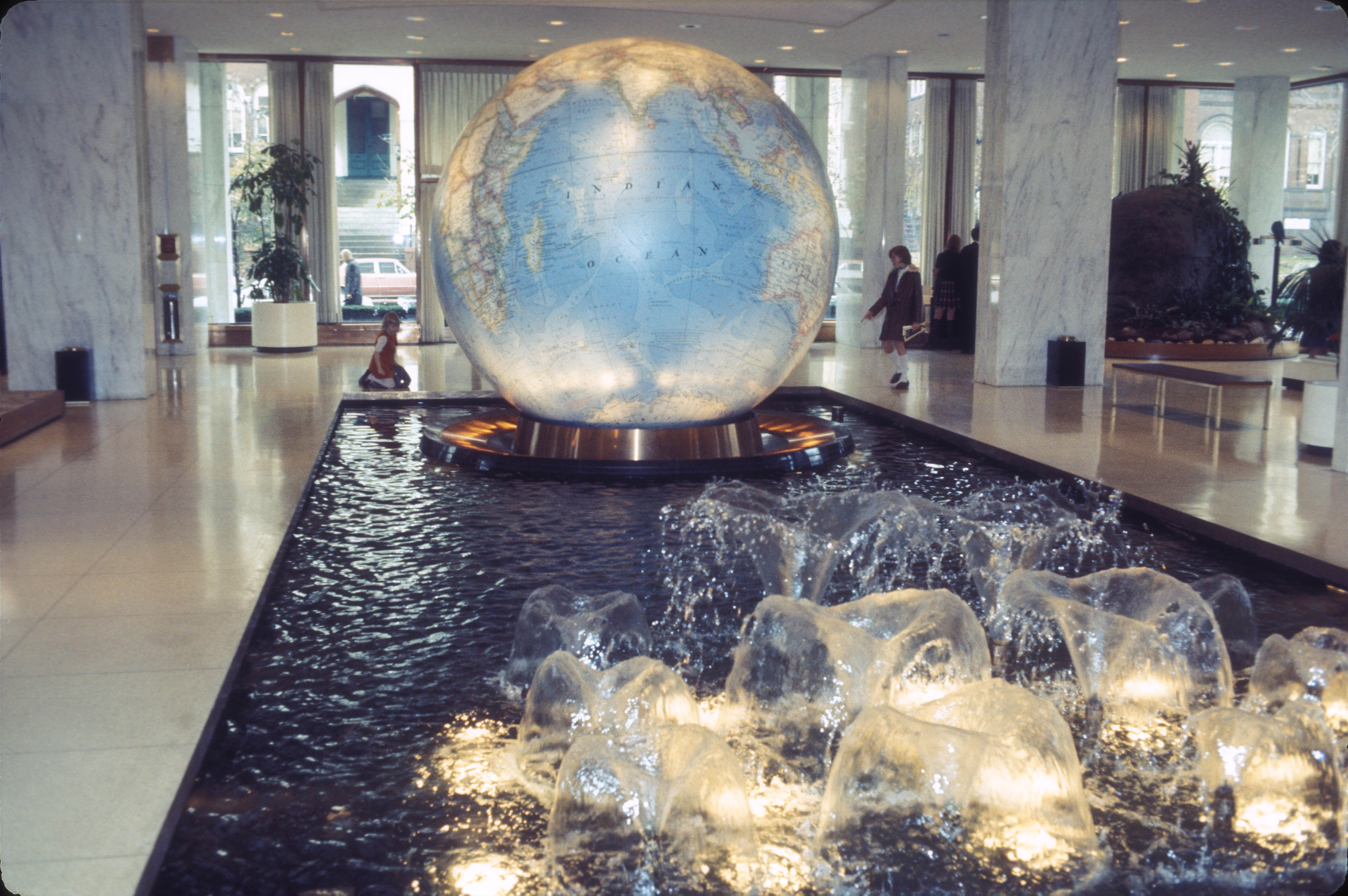
The interior of Explorers Hall in 1971

Explorers Hall was moved to the Stone Building and featured a rotating sphere measuring 11 feet (3.4 m) across and weighing 1,000 pounds (450 kg). An operator manning a control panel used various special effects to project educational imagery on the globe. Also featured in the building was one of the first three Picturephone booths in the United States. Developed by Bell Laboratories, the machine allowed for video phone calls to either of the other booths located at the time in New York and Chicago. The booth in the Stone Building was open to the public and calls could be made at the rate of $16 for the first three minutes to New York and $21 for the same duration to Chicago. President Johnson's wife Lady Bird attended a 1964 inauguration ceremony for the new technology and made a call to the Bell Labs scientist Elizabeth A. Wood in New York.

In 1978, both Hubbard Hall and the Administration Building were listed on the National Register of Historic Places (NRHP) as contributing structures to the Sixteenth Street Historic District. Those buildings along with the Stone Building were collectively added to the District of Columbia Inventory of Historic Sites in 2022 and to the NRHP in 2023.

The headquarters has continued to expand since the completion of the Stone Building. Another new structure was constructed in 1984 between the Stone and Administration buildings. The nonprofit institution, flush with capital and needing to spend it, paid the building's full $50 million cost with cash. Designed by Skidmore, Owings & Merrill (SOM), the seven-story building features horizontal massing with ziggurat-style setbacks. As it was less than 50 years old when the complex was listed on the NRHP, the SOM building is considered too modern to be a contributing structure to the site's historical status. Hubbard Hall was renovated in 1984 as well, during which the five N.C. Wyeth murals located inside were professionally restored.

By 2022, the site that had begun as a 7,659-square-foot (711.5 m^{2}) building had grown by over 100 times to a complex the size of nearly 900,000 square feet (84,000 m^{2}). In 2024 it was announced that the society was yet again expanding its campus – now nicknamed "Base Camp" – with the addition of a 100,000-square-foot (9,300 m^{2}) museum. According to the director of the group's building operations, the new construction "extends into the campus's four existing buildings" including Hubbard Hall. Construction on the museum began in mid-2022 and as of October 2024 was scheduled to be completed in mid-2026.

== Architecture ==
=== Hubbard Hall ===
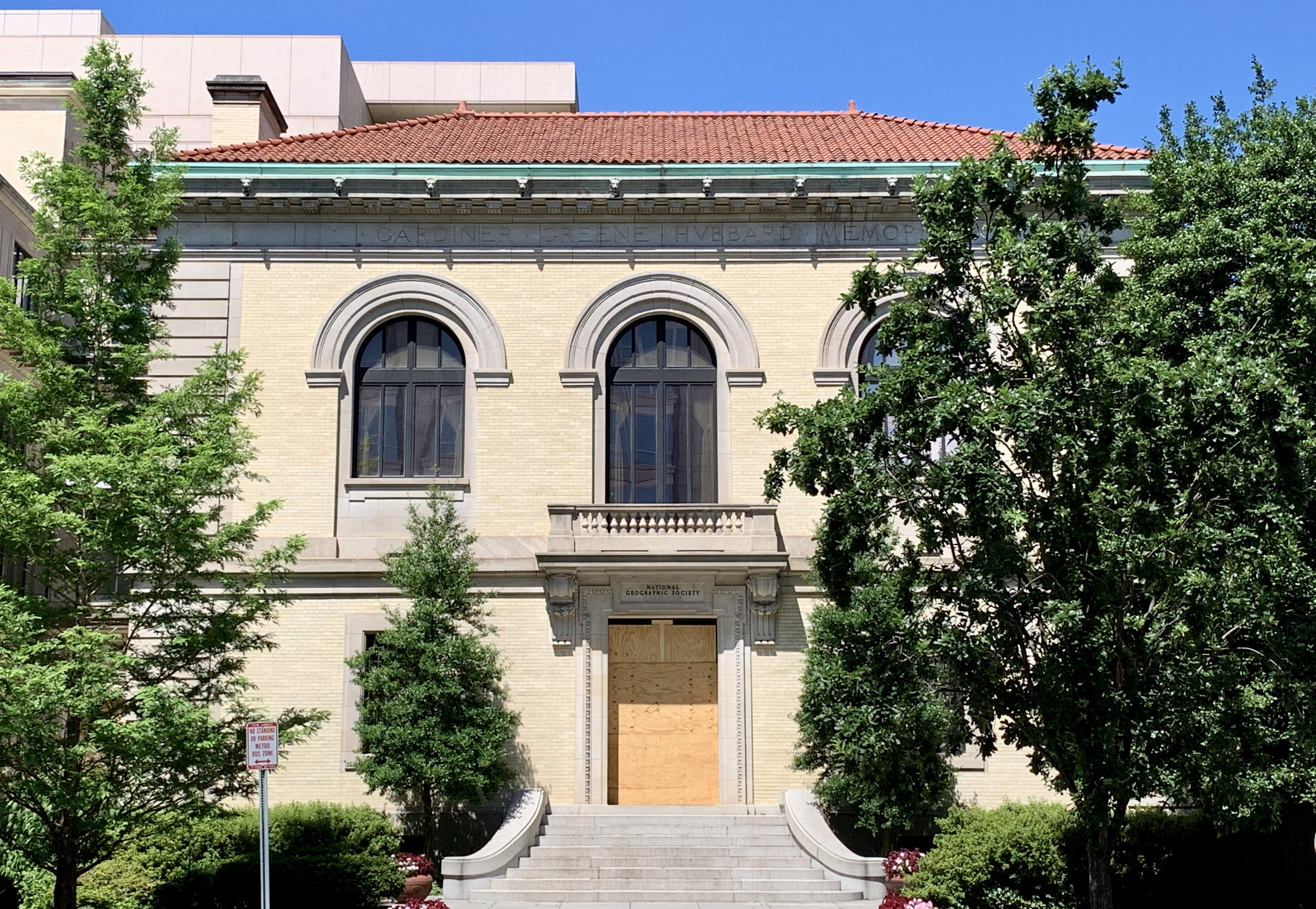
Hubbard Hall

The first purpose-built headquarters for the National Geographic Society was Hubbard Hall, a two-story, three-bay structure. It was designed by Hornblower & Marshall, a D.C.–based architectural firm responsible for a number of other listings on the National Register of Historic Places. The firm chose an Italian Renaissance style for the building, which helped it fit into what was a primarily residential neighborhood while still giving the appearance of an institutional building.

The exterior is constructed with brick and both brick and mortar are buff-colored which makes the façade appear smooth. Limestone is used for detailing, and the hipped roof is red terracotta. The primary façade includes a first-floor central entrance flanked by two single windows. Above the entrance is a stone tablet that reads "NATIONAL GEOGRAPHIC SOCIETY" in all capital letters. A row of decorative stone known as a stringcourse separates the first and second stories, above which are three large arched windows and a central Juliet balcony. Above the windows a horizontal strip, or frieze, is inscribed with "GARDINER GREENE HUBBARD MEMORIAL" in all capitals.

The building's north elevation facing M Street consists of three single windows on the first story and one large arched window on the second. The south elevation faces the 1912 Administration Building and features a recessed hyphen connecting the two. The west elevation has a two-story wing projecting from the building's central massing, and since 1984 has closely faced the fourth, most recent building in the complex.

The interior of the building includes a first-floor vestibule and foyer equipped with marble floors and walls and a marble split staircase ascending from the foyer. The staircase's landings are painted with murals by the artist N.C. Wyeth that symbolize "the instinct for exploration and discovery". The paintings were a late addition to the building, having been commissioned in 1926 and installed the following year. The rest of the first floor originally held offices for the organization's board members, while a basement contained darkrooms and filing rooms for developing and storing the group's photography. An auditorium and library shared a large second story room that later served as a board room and features a large carved stone fireplace.

=== Administration Building ===
The next building constructed in the complex was the Administration Building, which was designed by Arthur B. Heaton and built in two phases over a decade apart. The completed building is a four-story, Neoclassical structure consisting of a central pavilion flanked by five-bay wings. It is primarily constructed of buff-colored brick, which along with a similar red terracotta roof provides continuity with Hubbard Hall despite the change in architectural style.

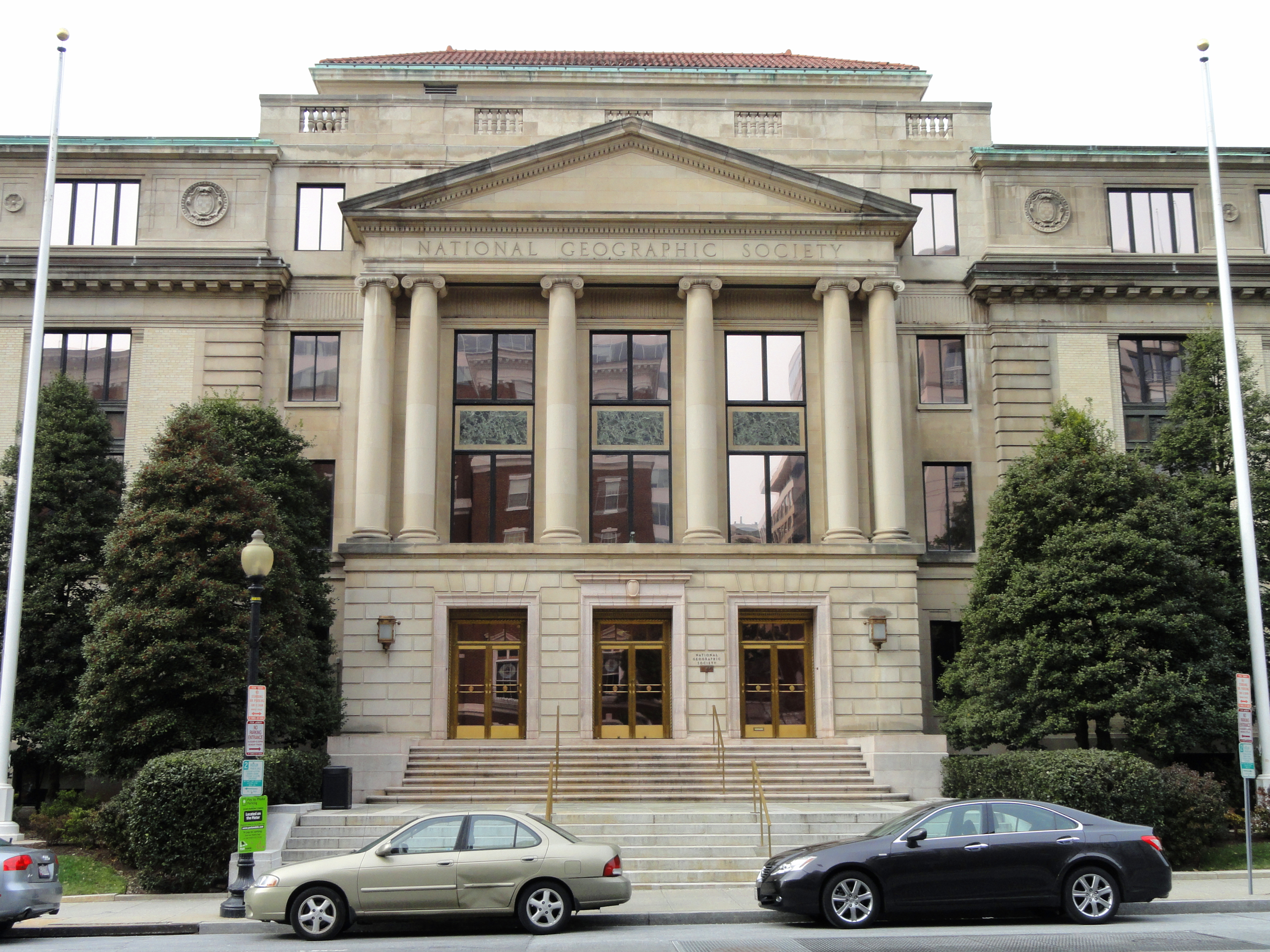
Administration Building pavilion

The building's primary elevation faces east on 16th Street. Its entrance consists of three door openings cut into the pavilion's stone base and topped by a triangular enclosed pediment supported by Ionic columns that span the second and third stories. A frieze is carved with the words "NATIONAL GEOGRAPHIC SOCIETY" in all capitals. The structure's wings are designed in the form of a classical column: a base consisting of the basement and first story, a shaft made of the second and third stories, and a fourth story capital. The base is separated from the upper levels by stringcourses. The shaft features double-height windows and giant order pilasters. A row of limestone molding known as a cornice projects below the capital, which consists of windows separated by limestone panels decorated with carved limestone rosettes.

The Administration Building contained offices for the society, and aside from the central lobby, the original floor plan and decorative elements have been much altered since its construction. The lobby features at least six types of marble; marble floors and walls are joined by red marble columns that extend upward to a plaster entablature and ceiling. A marble and brass world globe, the former logo of the society's magazine is embossed in the center of the floor and surrounded by a marble-laid star.

=== Stone Building ===
Stone Building

The Stone Building, also known as the Headquarters Building, was built between 1963–64. It was designed by Edward Durell Stone in the New Formalism style in an effort to create a modern building that still echoed the society's architectural history. The ten-story building is built of reinforced concrete covered with white marble cladding, and, like the society's previous Administration Building, is designed in the form of a classical column: a one-story base supports a nine-story shaft, topped by a flat-roofed capital. The building's primary elevation faces 17th Street, which re-oriented the complex's primary entrance from east to west.

The structure's ground floor exterior features an array of marble piers that support the building's canopy and form an arcade. The piers' resemblance to marble columns adds to the classicist appearance of the modernist building. The primary entrance on 17th Street is composed of centered pairs of bronze doors, above which is engraved "National Geographic Society". The building's shaft is made up of rows of narrow, bronze-framed windows flanked by marble "fins" projecting outward and separated horizontally by black granite spandrels. The design emphasizes the building's vertical composition. A flat, projecting roof caps the structure, which was an element Stone used often in his work. All four of the building's elevations share the same design motif, and all four have ground floor entrances.

The building's interior was constructed with an array of office space, laboratories, exhibit halls, and a cafeteria. While most of the interior has since undergone considerable changes, the main lobby retains much of its original appearance and fixtures. It contains stone floors and marble walls, and features a brass globe in its floor much like the lobby of the Administration Building.

== See also ==
- National Register of Historic Places listings in Washington, D.C.
