= National Geographic Society =

American scientific organization

- Logo as of 2021

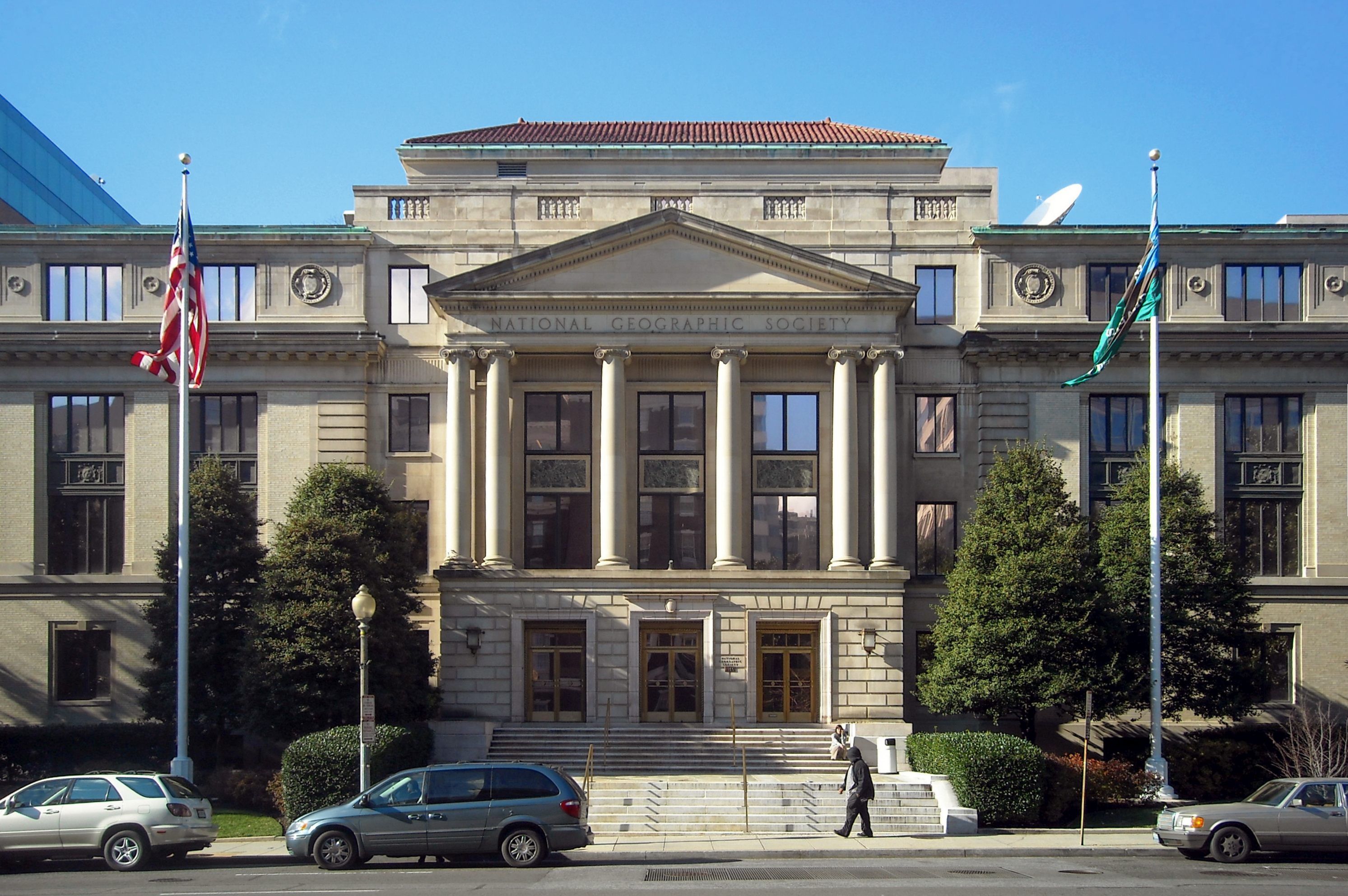
- The National Geographic Society's Administration Building in Washington, D.C.
- Formation: January 13, 1888; 138 years ago
- Type: 501(c)(3), charitable organization
- Tax ID no.: 53-0193519
- Purpose: Education; Environmental protection; Historical preservation
- Headquarters: 1145 17th Street Washington, D.C., U.S.
- Coordinates: 38.9051°N 77.0379°W
- Region served: Worldwide
- Chairman: Jean M. Case
- CEO: Jill Tiefenthaler
- Main organ: Board of Trustees
- Subsidiaries: National Geographic Partners (27%)
- Website: www.nationalgeographic.org

Flag of the National Geographic Society

The National Geographic Society, headquartered in Washington, D.C., United States, is one of the largest nonprofit scientific and educational organizations in the world.

Founded in 1888, its interests include geography, archaeology, natural science, the promotion of environmental and historical conservation, and the study of world culture and history. The National Geographic Society's logo is a yellow portrait frame—rectangular in shape—which appears on the margins surrounding the front covers of its magazines and as its television channel logo. Through National Geographic Partners (a joint venture with the Walt Disney Company), the society operates the magazine National Geographic, multiple TV channels, a website, worldwide events, and other media operations.

== Overview ==
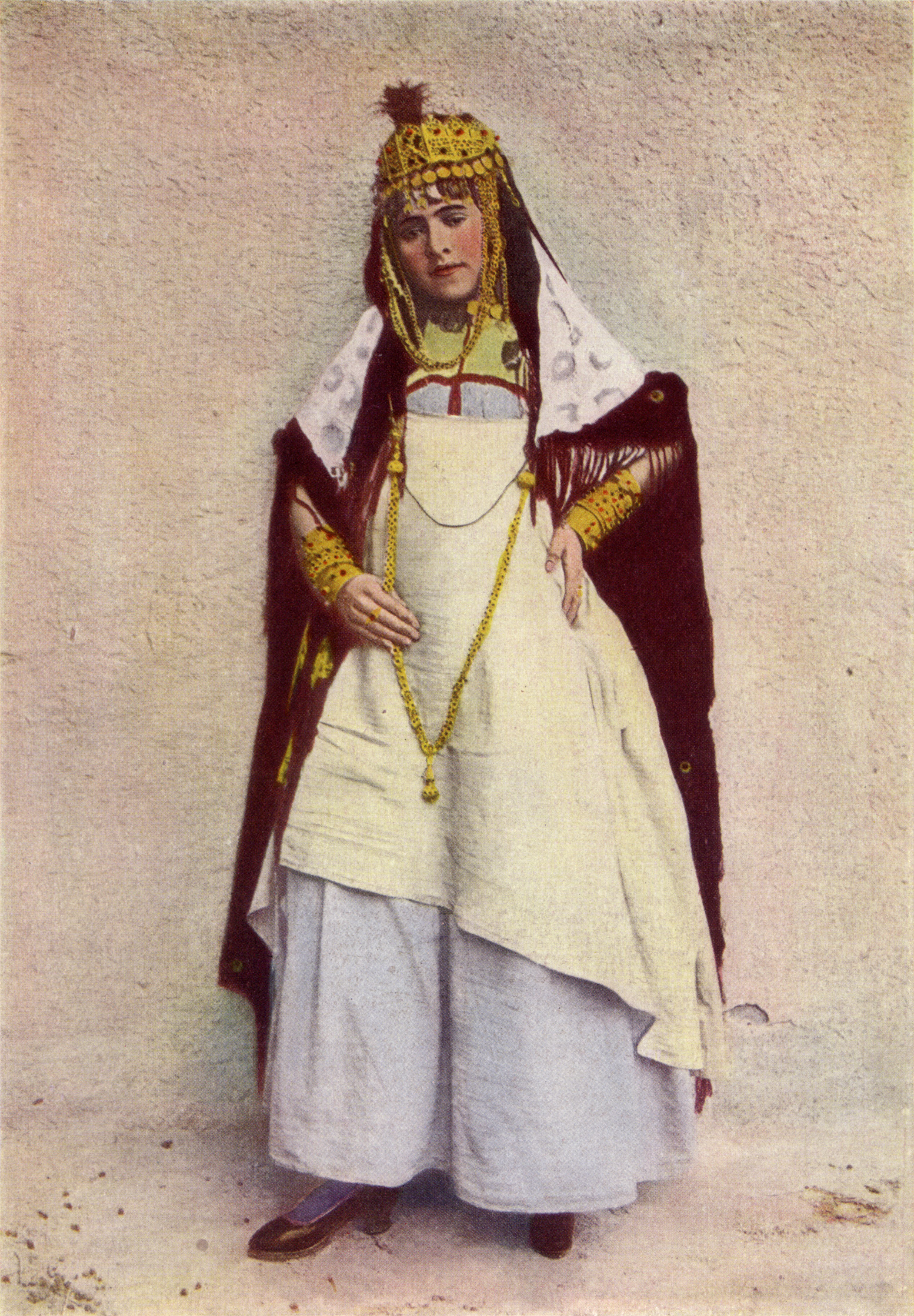
A dancer of the cafes, Algeria, 1917 photograph from National Geographic Magazine

The National Geographic Society was founded on January 13, 1888 "to increase and diffuse geographic knowledge". It is governed by a board of trustees whose 33 members include distinguished educators, business executives, former government officials and conservationists. The organization sponsors and funds scientific research and exploration. National Geographic maintains a museum for the public in its Washington, D.C., headquarters.

It has helped to sponsor popular traveling exhibits, such as the early 2010s King Tut exhibit featuring artifacts from the tomb of the young Egyptian Pharaoh. The Education Foundation gives grants to education organizations and individuals to improve geography education. The Committee for Research and Exploration has awarded more than 11,000 grants for scientific research and exploration.

National Geographic has retail stores in Washington, D.C., London, Sydney, and Panama. The locations outside of the United States are operated by Worldwide Retail Store S.L., a Spanish holding company.

The society's media arm is National Geographic Partners, a joint venture between the Walt Disney Company and the society, which publishes a journal, National Geographic in English and nearly 40 local-language editions. It also publishes other magazines, books, school products, maps, and Web and film products in numerous languages and countries. National Geographic's various media properties reach more than 280 million people monthly. Its efforts are supported by a wide range of individual, charitable, governmental and corporate donors, including the Leonardo DiCaprio Foundation, Gates Foundation, Lockheed Martin, Pfizer, National Endowment for the Humanities and many others.

== History ==
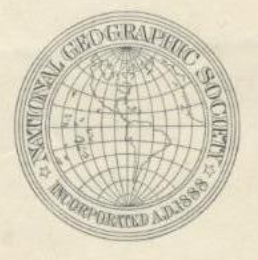
Historical emblem of the National Geographic Society

The National Geographic Society began as a club for an elite group of academics and wealthy patrons interested in travel and exploration. On January 13, 1888, 33 explorers and scientists gathered at the Cosmos Club, a private club then located on Lafayette Square in Washington, D.C., to organize "a society for the increase and diffusion of geographical knowledge." After preparing a constitution and a plan of organization, the National Geographic Society was incorporated two weeks later on January 27. Gardiner Greene Hubbard (co-founder of AT&T) became its first president and his son-in-law, Alexander Graham Bell (also co-founder of AT&T), succeeded him in 1897.

In 1899, Bell's son-in-law Gilbert Hovey Grosvenor was named the first full-time editor of National Geographic magazine and eventually elected as the president of the society in 1920. Grosvenor resigned as editor and president in 1954 and served as chairman of the organization's board until his death in 1966. Members of the Grosvenor family have played important roles in the organization since. Bell and Gilbert Hovey Grosvenor devised the successful marketing notion of society membership and the first major use of photographs to tell stories in magazines.

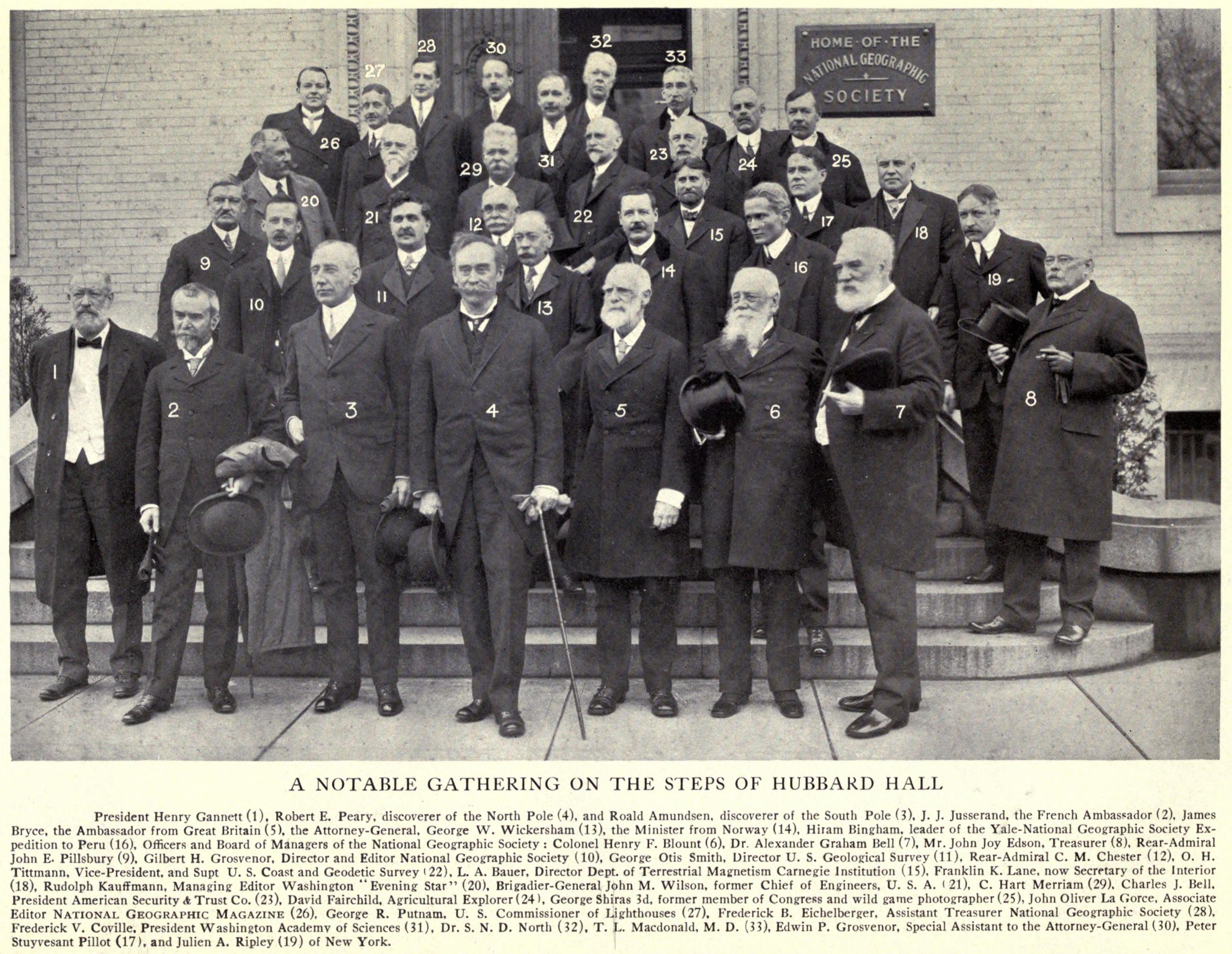
A notable gathering on the steps of Hubbard Hall, 1909

The chairman of the National Geographic Society currently is Jean Case. Michael Ulica is president. Jill Tiefenthaler is the chief executive officer. The editor-in-chief of National Geographic magazine is Susan Goldberg. Gilbert Melville Grosvenor, a former chairman, received the Presidential Medal of Freedom in 2005 for his leadership in geography education.

In 2004, the National Geographic Society Headquarters in Washington, D.C., was one of the first buildings to receive a "Green" certification from Global Green USA. The National Geographic received the prestigious Prince of Asturias Award for Communication and Humanities in October 2006 in Oviedo, Spain.

National Geographic Expeditions was launched in 1999 to fulfill one of its missions and for the proceeds to go towards its mission.

In 2006, the society purchased Hampton-Brown, an English-as-a-second-language educational material publisher, using a good part of its endowments. However, the publisher did not generate much profit. By 2009, the society's endowments were about $200 million.

National Geographic Ventures, its commercial arm, launched a music division, National Geographic Music and Radio, in 2007. The society formed in October 2007 National Geographic Entertainment division to include its entertainment units.

In 2013, the society was investigated for possible violation of the Foreign Corrupt Practices Act relating to their close association with an Egyptian government official responsible for antiquities.

On September 9, 2015, the society announced that it would re-organize its media properties and publications into a new company known as National Geographic Partners, which would be majority-owned by 21st Century Fox (21CF) with a 73% stake. This new, for-profit corporation, would own National Geographic and other magazines, as well as its affiliated television networks—most of which were already owned in joint ventures with 21CF. As a consequence, the society and 21st Century Fox announced on November 2, 2015, that 9 percent of National Geographic's 2,000 employees, approximately 180 people, would be laid off, constituting the biggest staff reduction in the society's history. Later, The Walt Disney Company assumed 21CF's share in National Geographic Partners, following the completion of Disney's acquisition of most of 21CF assets on March 20, 2019. On June 29, 2023, National Geographic laid off the remaining staff writers for their magazine and announced their publications would no longer be sold at physical newsstands in the United States in 2024. In a statement to the press, a spokesperson for the society said that the company will continue to publish a monthly magazine "dedicated to exceptional multi-platform storytelling with cultural impact" through the work of freelance writers and the few remaining editors on staff.

=== List of original founders ===
The 33 original founders of the National Geographic Society in 1888:

- Cleveland Abbe
- Frank Baker
- Marcus Baker
- John Russell Bartlett
- Charles J. Bell
- Rogers Birnie
- William Dall
- Arthur Powell Davis
- Clarence Dutton
- Henry Gannett
- Samuel Gannett
- Grove Karl Gilbert
- George Brown Goode
- James Howard Gore
- Adolphus Washington Greely
- Edward Everett Hayden
- Henry Wetherbee Henshaw
- Gardiner Greene Hubbard
- Willard Drake Johnson
- George Kennan
- George Wallace Melville
- Clinton Hart Merriam
- Henry Mitchell
- Robert Muldrow II
- Herbert Gouverneur Ogden
- John Wesley Powell
- William Bramwell Powell
- Israel Russell
- Winfield Scott Schley
- Almon Harris Thompson
- Gilbert Thompson
- Otto Hilgard Tittmann
- James Clarke Welling

Although Alexander Graham Bell is sometimes discussed as a founder, he was actually the second president, elected on January 7, 1898, and serving until 1903.

== Activities ==
=== Support for research and projects ===
The society has helped sponsor many expeditions and research projects over the years.

=== Awards ===
==== Hubbard Medal ====
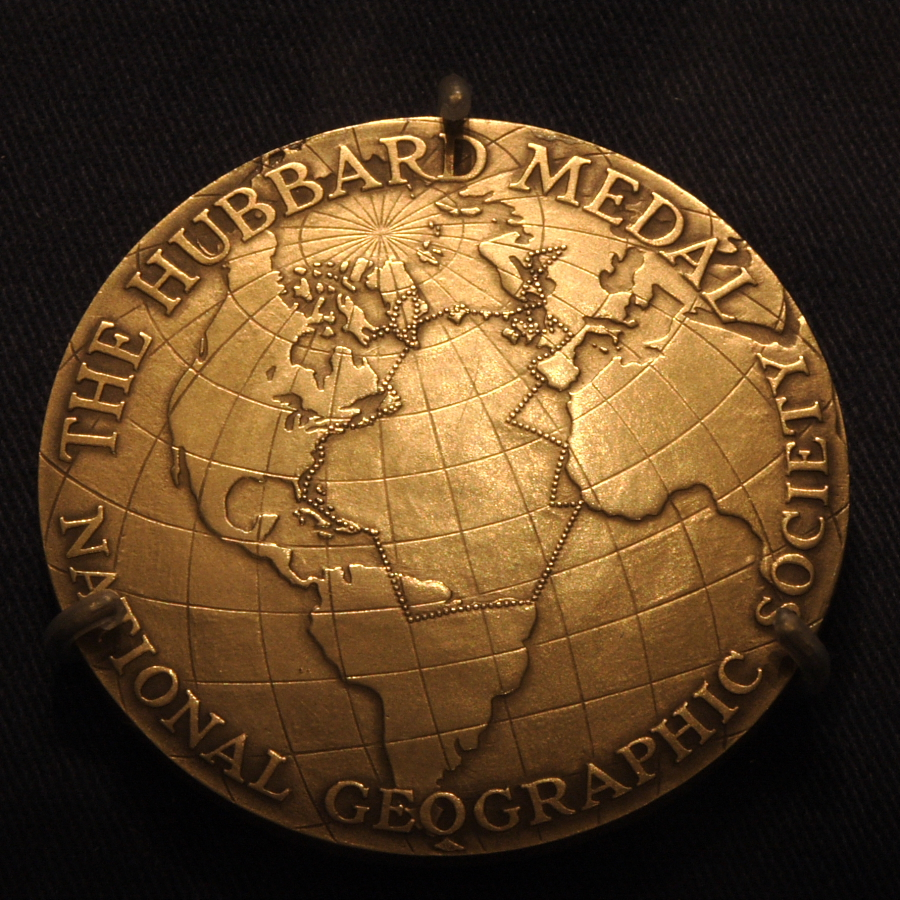
Anne Morrow Lindbergh's customized medal detailing her flight route

The Hubbard Medal is awarded by the National Geographic Society for distinction in exploration, discovery, and research. The medal is named for Gardiner Greene Hubbard, the first National Geographic Society president. The Hubbard Medal has been presented 44 times as of 2018, the most recent award going to Peter H. Raven.

==== Alexander Graham Bell Medal ====
The National Geographic Society also awards, rarely, the Alexander Graham Bell Medal, for exceptional contributions to geographic research. The award is named after Alexander Graham Bell, scientist, inventor of the telephone and the second president of the NGS. Up to mid-2011, the medal has been twice presented:

- 1980: Bradford Washburn and wife Barbara Washburn
- 2010: Roger Tomlinson and Jack Dangermond

=== National Geographic Museum ===
The society operates the National Geographic Museum, located at 1145 17th Street, NW (17th and M), in Washington, D.C. The museum features changing exhibitions featuring the work of National Geographic explorers, photographers, and scientists. There are also changing exhibits related to natural history, culture, history or society. Permanent exhibits include artifacts like the camera Robert Peary used at the North Pole and pottery that Jacques Cousteau recovered from a shipwreck. In early 2023, the museum closed for a major renovation; it reopened on June 26, 2026, and is now known as the National Geographic Museum of Exploration.

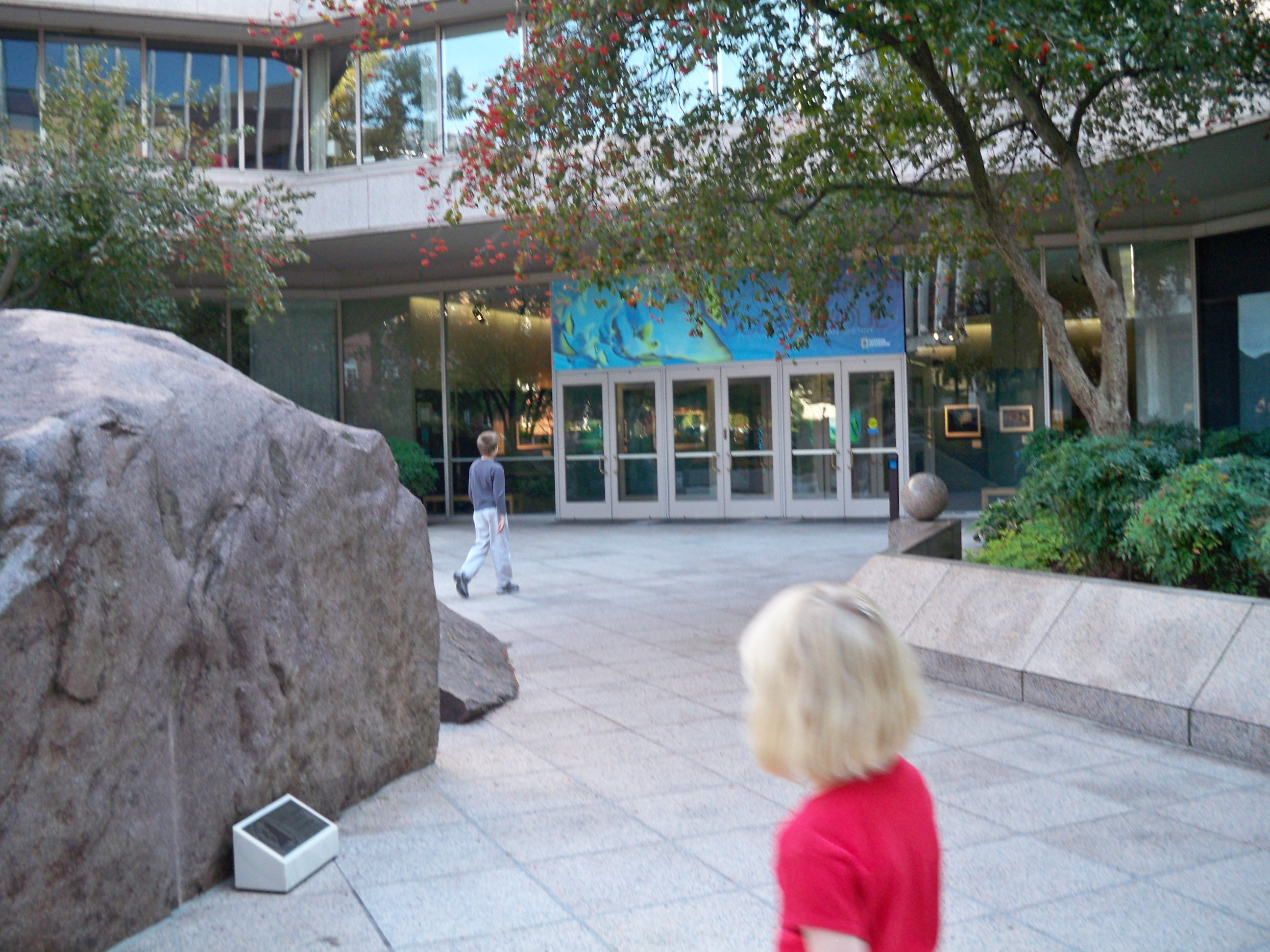
Courtyard entrance to the National Geographic Museum

=== National Geographic Explorers program ===
The NGS names individuals as "Explorers" or "Youth Explorer" for "exceptional individuals in their fields who receive funding and support from the Society to illuminate and protect our world through their work in science, exploration, education, and storytelling." They consist of scientists or content producers, such as photographers and filmmakers. National Geographic Explorers have included:

- Angela Busheska (2021)
- Jen Guyton, American photographer and ecologist
- Suaad Al Harthi, conservation scientist and executive director of the Environment Society of Oman (ESO)
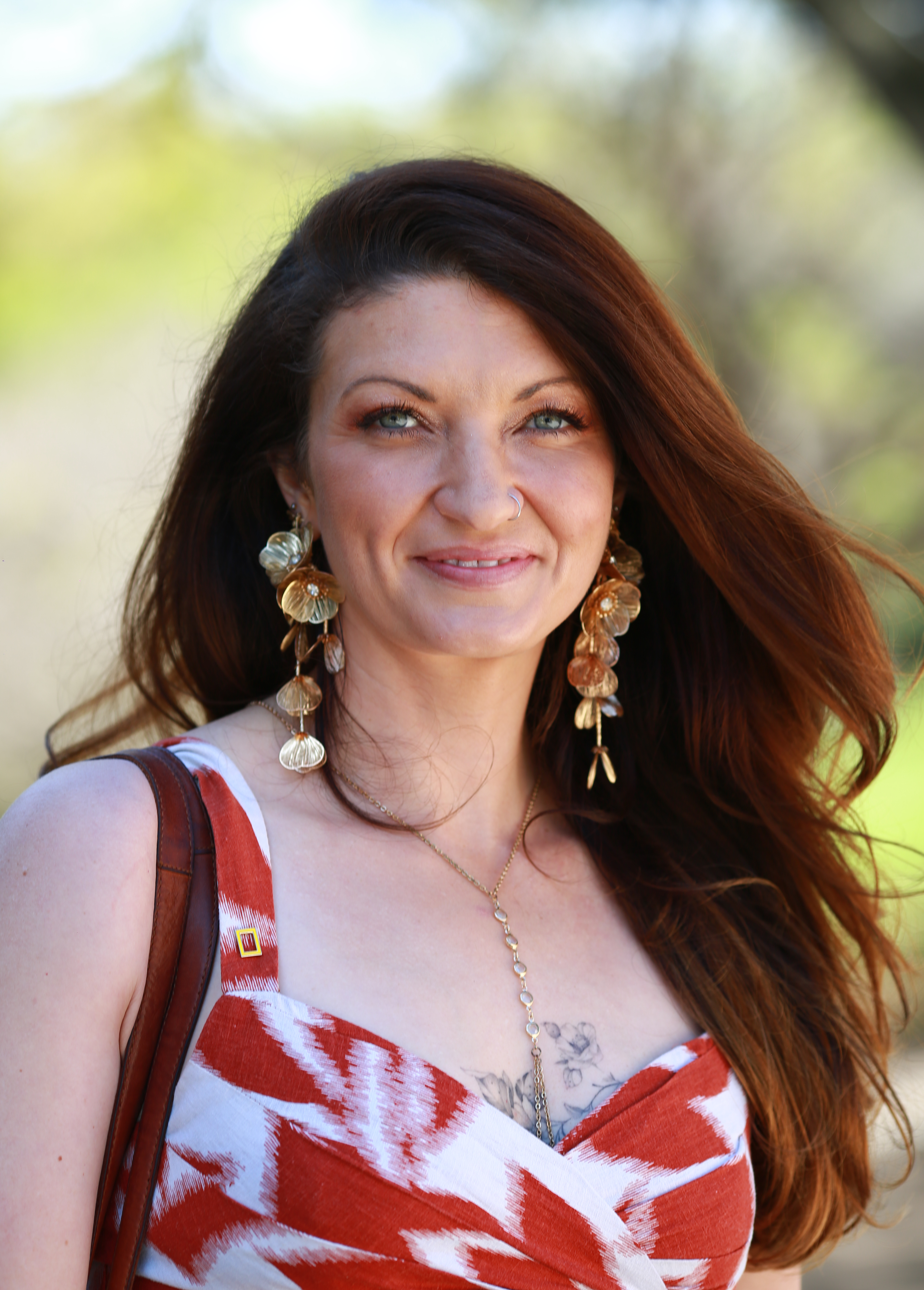
Jen Guyton

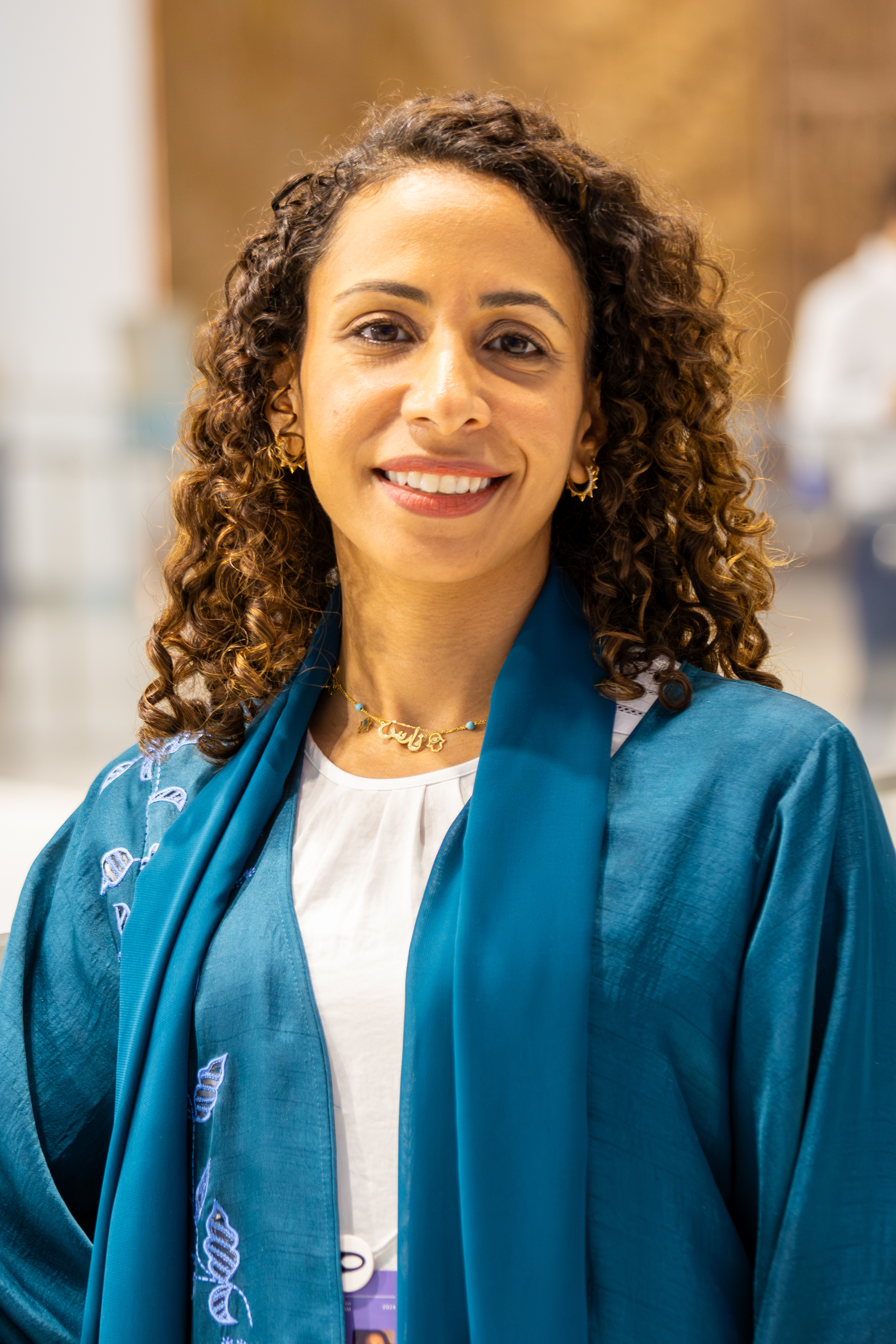
Suaad Al Harthi

=== Commercial ventures ===
National Geographic Partners, a for-profit joint venture between The Walt Disney Company (which owns a 73% stake) and the society (which owns 27%), was established in 2015 to handle commercial activities of the society, including television channels worldwide (which were already co-owned by the society and Fox) and magazine publications. The Walt Disney Company assumed 21CF's share of National Geographic Partners in March 2019.

Most of National Geographic Partners' businesses predate the establishment in 2015, and even the launch of National Geographic Channel in Asia and Europe by the original News Corporation (of which 21st Century Fox is one of the successors) in the late 1990s.

The society formed in October 2007 National Geographic Entertainment division to include Cinema Ventures, Feature Films, Kids Entertainment, Home Entertainment and Music & Radio divisions. Music and Radio division president David Beal was appointed head of Nat Geo Entertainment.

==== Publications ====
===== National Geographic =====
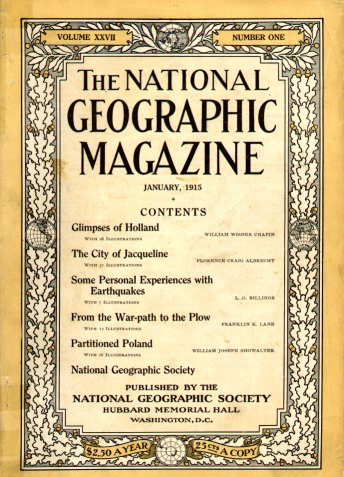
Cover of January 1915 The National Geographic Magazine

The National Geographic Magazine, later shortened to National Geographic, published its first issue in October 1888, nine months after the society was founded, as the society's official journal, a benefit for joining the tax-exempt National Geographic Society. Starting with the February 1910 (Vol XXI, No. 2) issue, the magazine began using its now famous trademarked yellow border around the edge of its covers.

There are 12 monthly issues of National Geographic per year. The magazine contains articles about geography, popular science, world history, culture, current events and photography of places and things all over the world and universe. National Geographic magazine is currently published in 40 local-language editions in many countries around the world. Combined English and other language circulation is around 6.8 million monthly, with some 60 million readers. The society has held a minority interest in the magazine since 2015.

===== Other publications =====
In addition to its flagship magazine, the society publishes several other periodicals:

- National Geographic Explorer: Classroom magazine. The National Geographic School Bulletin was launched in 1919 and was replaced by the children's magazine National Geographic World in 1975. NG World was separated into the current National Geographic Explorer and National Geographic Kids in 2001.
- National Geographic History: Launched in Spring 2015.
- National Geographic Kids: A version of National Geographic Magazine for children, launched in 1975 under the name National Geographic World. It has a U.S. circulation of over 1.5 million. There are also currently 18 local-language editions of NG Kids, with another half million in circulation. An Arabic edition of the children's magazine was launched in Egypt in early 2007, and more than 42,000 copies are distributed to all the public schools in Egypt, in addition to another 15,000 single-copy sales. More recently, an Albanian and Polish edition were launched.
- National Geographic Little Kids: For younger children aged 3–6
- National Geographic Traveler: Launched in 1984. There are 18 local-language editions of NG Traveler.

The society also ran an online daily news outlet called National Geographic News.

Additionally, the society publishes atlases, books, and maps through National Geographic Books and National Geographic Maps, commercial publishing divisions of National Geographic Partners. It previously published and co-published other magazines, including National Geographic Adventure, National Geographic Research (a scientific journal), and others, and continues to publish special issues of various magazines.

The society published a series of books about natural remedies and medicinal herbs. Titles include Guide to Medicinal Herbs, Complete Guide to Natural Home Remedies, Nature's Best Remedies, Healing Remedies, and Natural Home Remedies. The books make claims to describe, among other things, plants, herbs, and essential oils purported to help treat diseases and ailments. While giving some appropriate warnings about such concerns as anecdotal evidence and side effects are given, the books have been criticized from a medical perspective for a number of reasons. These include making recommendations that lack scientific evidence, inconsistent claims from one book to the next as well as internal contradictions, and failure to mention effective and safe alternatives. The journal Skeptical Inquirer devoted thirty-four pages in 2019 discussing these books. Experts such as Harriet Hall, Joe Nickell, Cees Renckens and Barry Kosmin addressed each subject in the series of books. Summing up the series, Hall wrote in a review of the series that, "The author Nancy J. Hajeski is a fiction and nonfiction writer with no medical or scientific credentials. The forward is by Tieraona Low Dog, MD, an integrative medicine specialist. ... which is a marketing term designed to infiltrate quackery into science-based medicine."

==== Films and television ====
===== National Geographic Films =====
National Geographic Films was a wholly owned taxable subsidiary of the National Geographic Society.

National Geographic Films appointed Adam Leipzig as president in 2004. The society formed in October 2007 National Geographic Entertainment division to include Cinema Ventures and Feature Films. In 2008, the film division and Image Nation formed a $100 million fund to develop, produce, finance and acquire over five years 10–15 films. The first film the fund invested in was The Way Back.

Leipzig left the company in January 2010. On March 15, 2010, former Miramax president Daniel Battsek started as National Geographic Films president. Basttsek ended up also over seeing Nat Geo Cinema Ventures distribution and big screen production before he left in 2012 becoming president of Cohen Media Group.

Films it has produced include:

- K-19: The Widowmaker (2002), a feature film, submarine thriller based on the diary of a Russian submarine commander, starring Harrison Ford.
- Forces of Nature (2004)
- March of the Penguins (2005) grossed more than $125 million worldwide, distributed by National Geographic Films and Warner Independent
- God Grew Tired of Us (2006)
- Arctic Tale (2007), a feature film documenting the story of two families of walrus and polar bears, narrated by Queen Latifah.
- Sea Monsters (2007), inspired by a National Geographic Magazine article, is a 3-D large format and reality film, with a musical score by Peter Gabriel.
- Amreeka (2009)
- City of Life and Death (2009)
- The Way Back (2010)
- The First Grader (2010)
- The Wildest Dream (2010)
- Restrepo (July 2, 2010) Outpost Films Production; domestic rights, Sundance documentary grand jury prize winner
- Life in a Day (2011)
- The Last Lions (2011)
- Mysteries of the Unseen World (2013)
- Jerusalem (2013)
- Pandas: The Journey Home (2014)
- Undaunted Courage Meriwether Lewis, Thomas Jefferson and the Opening of the American West, a cancelled co-production with HBO by National Geographic Films, Edward Norton, and Brad Pitt based on Steven Ambrose's award-winning book.
- Blue Man Group: Mind Blast

In 2005, the National Geographic Society acquired the film distribution arm of Destination Cinema and entered the film distribution business.

During the COVID-19 pandemic, National Geographic partnered with pharmaceutical company Pfizer to produce a sponsored documentary chronicling the development of Pfizer and BioNTech's COVID-19 vaccine.

===== Cinema Ventures =====
National Geographic Cinema Ventures (NGCV) was a giant-screen, 3D and specialty films production and distribution company operated under National Geographic Entertainment.

At the late 2011 American Alliance of Museums conference, National Geographic Cinema Ventures launched the Museum Partnership Program as museums want a brand for their giant screen theaters. Starting on February 1, 2018, Cosmic Pictures gained distribution rights to a number of the NGCV library.

===== Museum Partnership Program =====
The Museum Partnership Program is the branding and content program of National Geographic Cinema Ventures. Partner museums would receive immediate market exclusivity on their 2 new digital 3D films per year and gain access to the National Geographic organization from members to exhibition to television.

There were nine partner museums as of 2012:

- Putnam Museum in Davenport, Iowa

===== Films =====
- Sea Monsters (2007)
- Extreme Weather
- Mysteries of the Unseen World (2013)
- Jerusalem (2013) - produced by Cosmic Pictures; distribution; Cosmic Pictures gain rights to distribute
- Pandas: The Journey Home (2014) 40-minute, Oxford Scientific Films Production for Sky3D and NGCV, in association with the Chinese Wildlife Conservation Association, Wolong Panda Conservation Centre, CCTV9, Nat Geo WILD; international distributor

===== Television programs =====
Television programs produced by the National Geographic Society are also broadcast on television. National Geographic television specials and series have been aired on PBS and other networks in the United States and globally for many years. For the first 10 years, Geographic produced the specials in partnership with documentary film vetaran Wolper Productions. The Geographic series in the U.S. started on CBS in 1964, moved to ABC in 1973, shifted to PBS (produced by WQED, Pittsburgh) in 1975, shifted to NBC in 1995, and returned to PBS in 2000. It moved to National Geographic Channel in 2005. Under PBS, from 1975 to 1985, Gulf Oil Corporation sponsored the specials, until the oil company merged with rival Chevron, and continued to sponsor the specials before moving to NBC in 1995.

It has featured stories on numerous scientific figures such as Jacques Cousteau, Jane Goodall, and Louis Leakey that not only featured their work but as well helped make them world-famous and accessible to millions. Most of the specials were narrated by various actors, including Glenn Close, Linda Hunt, Stacy Keach, Richard Kiley, Burgess Meredith, Susan Sarandon, Alexander Scourby, Martin Sheen, and Peter Strauss. The specials' theme music, by Elmer Bernstein, was also adopted by the National Geographic Channel.

Another long-running show is National Geographic Explorer.

===== Television channels =====
The original News Corporation launched National Geographic Channel in Asia and Europe in the late 1990s, in partnership with the society. The society provides programming to the National Geographic-branded channels worldwide, while, as of March 2019, The Walt Disney Company's subsidiaries (Walt Disney Television in the United States and Fox Networks Group outside the United States) handle distribution of the channels and advertisement sales. The National Geographic Channel has begun to launch a number of sub-branded channels in international markets, such as Nat Geo Wild, Nat Geo People and Nat Geo Kids.

The U.S. domestic version of National Geographic Channel was launched in January 2001 as a joint venture of National Geographic and Fox Cable Networks.

==== Music and radio ====
National Geographic Music and Radio (NGMR) is the music and radio division of National Geographic Ventures. The scope of the division includes National Geographic Live! events, digital music distribution, music publishing, radio content, Nat Geo Music TV channel (closed; formerly available in parts of Asia and Europe) and film and TV music. Clear Channel, Salem Communications and NPR were distribution partners.

In early August 2007, National Geographic Ventures announced the existence of the then-recently formed division. The division was already creating music for its feature film and kids units. Initially hired to run the division were Mark Bauman, executive vice president of radio and video production, and David Beal, head of music labels, publishing and radio operations. With National Geographic Channels, Music and Radio on October 15, 2007, launched the Nat Geo Music channel in Italy.

The society formed in October 2007 National Geographic Entertainment division to include the Music & Radio division and promoted the division president David Beal was appointed head of Nat Geo Entertainment. In 2009, the division became a full-service record label as Nat Geo Music with Mat Whittington appointed as president.

More recently, NGMR has leaned into the digital landscape with the rise of streaming services, maintaining an active presence on platforms such as Spotify, Apple Music and YouTube, showcasing soundtracks, artist collaborations, and music related to National Geographic's programming.

== See also ==
- American Geographical Society
- Genographic Project
- Maps of the United States
- National Geographic Bee
- Nicholas DeVore III
- The Photo Ark
- Royal Canadian Geographical Society
- Royal Geographical Society
