= List of awards and nominations received by Smriti Irani =

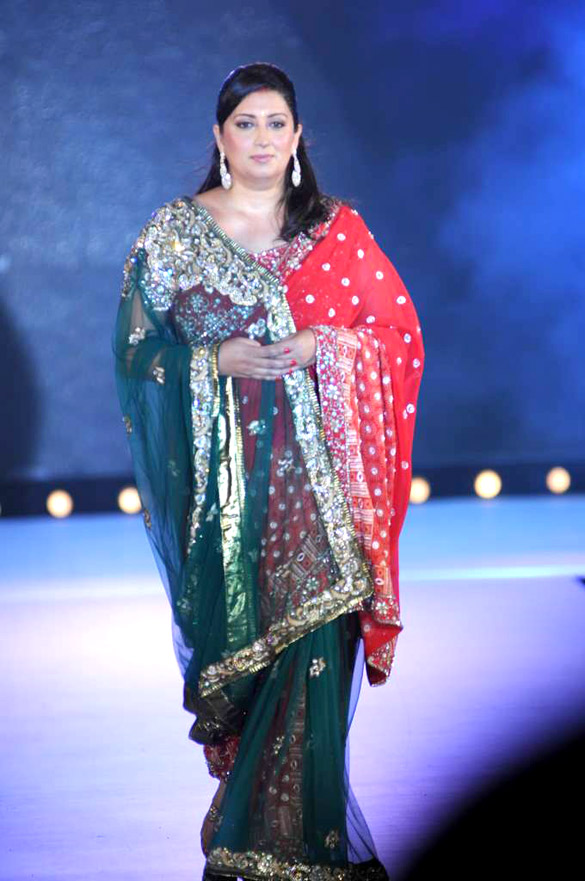
Irani walks the ramp in fashion designer Manish Malhotra and Shaina NC's fundraiser organized for Cancer Patients Aid Association (2012).

Smriti Irani is an Indian television actress, known for her portrayal as Tulsi Virani in Ekta Kapoor's production Kyunki Saas Bhi Kabhi Bahu Thi on Star Plus, for which she holds the record of winning five consecutive ITA Award for Best Actress Popular and four Indian Telly Awards.

== Indian Television Academy Awards ==
The Indian Television Academy Awards, also known as the (ITA Awards) is an annual event organised by the Indian Television Academy. The awards are presented in various categories, including popular programming (music, news, entertainment, sports, travel, lifestyle and fashion), best television channel in various categories, technical awards, and Best Performance awards.

Year	Category	Show	Character	Result	Ref.
2001	Best Actress (Popular)	Kyunki Saas Bhi Kabhi Bahu Thi	Tulsi Virani	Won	
2002	Best Actress (Popular)	Kyunki Saas Bhi Kabhi Bahu Thi	Tulsi Virani	Won	
2003	Best Actress (Popular)	Kyunki Saas Bhi Kabhi Bahu Thi	Tulsi Virani	Won	
2004	Best Actress (Popular)	Kyunki Saas Bhi Kabhi Bahu Thi	Tulsi Virani	Won	
2005	Best Actress (Popular)	Kyunki Saas Bhi Kabhi Bahu Thi	Tulsi Virani	Won	
2010	ITA Milestone Award	Kyunki Saas Bhi Kabhi Bahu Thi	Tulsi Virani	Won	

== Indian Telly Awards ==
The 'Indian Telly Awards' are annual honours presented by the company of Indian Television to persons and organisations in the television industry of India. The Awards are given in several categories such as best programme or series in a specific genre, best television channel in a particular category, most popular actors and awards for technical roles such as writers and directors.

Year	Category	Show	Character	Result	Ref.
2002	Best Actress in a Lead Role	Kyunki Saas Bhi Kabhi Bahu Thi	Tulsi Virani	Won	
2003	Best Actress in a Lead Role	Kyunki Saas Bhi Kabhi Bahu Thi	Tulsi Virani	Won	
2003	Best TV Personality	Kyunki Saas Bhi Kabhi Bahu Thi	Tulsi Virani	Won	
2007	Best Actress (Jury)	Virrudh	Vasudha Sushant Sharma	Won	
