= List of Koffee with Karan episodes =

Seasons and episodes of Koffee with Karan

Koffee with Karan is an Indian talk show on Disney+ Hotstar (previously broadcast on Star World India). Debuting on 19 November 2004, the show is hosted by film producer, director, and television personality Karan Johar and is produced by Dharmatic, the digital content division of his production company, Dharma Productions. (Note: Banijay Group's SOL India served as the show's production company for its first six seasons (2004–2019).) The show is distributed by Disney Star (Note: Known as Star India until 2022.) and its first six seasons aired on Star World (2004–2019) with the second season being simulcasted on Star One (2007). In 2022, Koffee with Karan moved over to Disney+ Hotstar as a streaming exclusive under the Hotstar Specials label, with the seventh season airing on the streaming platform.

== Series overview ==
Series	Episodes	Originally released	
Series	Episodes	First released	Last released
1	25	19 November 2004	27 May 2005
2	26	11 February 2007	16 September 2007
3	22	7 November 2010	17 April 2011
4	20	1 December 2013	13 April 2014
5	20	6 November 2016	19 March 2017
6	22	21 October 2018	17 March 2019
7	13	7 July 2022	29 September 2022
8	13	26 October 2023	18 January 2024
9	TBA	14 October 2026	TBA

== Episodes ==
=== Season 1 (2004–05) ===
No. overall	No. in season	Guests	Original release date
1	1	Shah Rukh Khan and Kajol	19 November 2004
2	2	Aishwarya Rai and Sanjay Leela Bhansali	26 November 2004
3	3	Preity Zinta and Saif Ali Khan	3 December 2004
4	4	Rani Mukerji and Kareena Kapoor	10 December 2004
5	5	Fardeen Khan and Zayed Khan	17 December 2004
6	6	Gurinder Chadha and Farah Khan	24 December 2004
7	7	Amitabh Bachchan and Abhishek Bachchan	7 January 2005
8	8	Gauri Khan, Sussanne Khan, Shah Rukh Khan, and Hrithik Roshan	14 January 2005
9	9	Bipasha Basu and Lara Dutta	21 January 2005
10	10	Ekta Kapoor, Sunita Menon, and Manish Malhotra	28 January 2005
11	11	Sushmita Sen and Sanjay Dutt	4 February 2005
12	12	Hrithik Roshan, Farhan Akhtar, and Uday Chopra	11 February 2005
13	13	Sunny Deol and Bobby Deol	18 February 2005
14	14	Shabana Azmi and Shobhaa De	4 March 2005
15	15	Abhishek Bachchan and Preity Zinta	11 March 2005
16	16	Konkana Sen Sharma and Rahul Bose	18 March 2005
17	17	Priyanka Chopra and Arjun Rampal	25 March 2005
18	18	Smriti Irani and Sakshi Tanwar	1 April 2005
19	19	Vivek Oberoi and John Abraham	8 April 2005
20	20	Malaika Arora Khan, Amrita Arora, and Dino Morea	22 April 2005
21	21	Rishi Kapoor and Neetu Singh	29 April 2005
22	22	Esha Deol and Shahid Kapoor	6 May 2005
23	23	Hema Malini and Zeenat Aman	13 May 2005
24	24	Special Episode	20 May 2005
25	25	Shah Rukh Khan, Amitabh Bachchan, Sanjay Leela Bhansali, Farhan Akhtar, Farah Khan, Kajol, and Jaya Bachchan	27 May 2005

=== Season 2 (2007) ===
No. overall	No. in season	Guests	Original release date
26	1	Kajol, Rani Mukerji and Shah Rukh Khan	11 February 2007
27	2	Hrithik Roshan and Priyanka Chopra	18 February 2007
28	3	Mallika Sherawat and Sanjay Leela Bhansali	25 February 2007
29	4	Kareena Kapoor, Shahid Kapoor, and Karisma Kapoor	4 March 2007
30	5	Saif Ali Khan and Soha Ali Khan	11 March 2007
31	6	Mira Nair, Tabu, and Farah Khan	18 March 2007
32	7	Sanjay Dutt and Priya Dutt	25 March 2007
33	8	Vijay Mallya and Shobhaa De	1 April 2007
34	9	Konkana Sen Sharma, Kunal Kapoor, and Riteish Deshmukh	8 April 2007
35	10	Hema Malini, Jaya Bachchan, Esha Deol, and Shweta Bachchan Nanda	15 April 2007
36	11	Rakesh Roshan, Rakesh Omprakash Mehra, Kunal Kohli, and Rajkumar Hirani	22 April 2007
37	12	Rakhi Sawant and Carol Gracias	29 April 2007
38	13	Bipasha Basu and John Abraham	6 May 2007
39	14	Rishi Kapoor, Randhir Kapoor, Rajiv Kapoor, Neetu Singh, and Reema Jain	13 May 2007
40	15	Richard Gere	20 May 2007
41	16	Ekta Kapoor, Ram Kapoor, Ronit Roy, and Hiten Tejwani	27 May 2007
42	17	Shilpa Shetty, Shamita Shetty, and Sunanda Shetty	3 June 2007
43	18	Preity Zinta and Bobby Deol	10 June 2007
44	19	Madhuri Dixit and Rani Mukerji	24 June 2007
45	20	Anil Kapoor and Akshaye Khanna	22 July 2007
46	21	Himesh Reshammiya	29 July 2007
47	22	Lara Dutta and Katrina Kaif	5 August 2007
48	23	Javed Akhtar, Shabana Azmi, and Farhan Akhtar	12 August 2007
49	24	Farah Khan, Shah Rukh Khan, and Deepika Padukone	26 August 2007
50	25	Special Episode	9 September 2007
51	26	Koffee Awards with Rohit Bal, Malaika Arora Khan, and Cyrus Broacha	16 September 2007

=== Season 3 (2010–11) ===
No. overall	No. in season	Guests	Original release date
52	1	Aishwarya Rai Bachchan and Abhishek Bachchan	7 November 2010
53	2	Ranbir Kapoor and Imran Khan	14 November 2010
54	3	Deepika Padukone and Sonam Kapoor	21 November 2010
55	4	Farah Khan, Rajkumar Hirani, and Imtiaz Ali	28 November 2010
56	5	Kareena Kapoor and Saif Ali Khan	5 December 2010
57	6	Anil Kapoor, Sanjay Dutt, and Kangana Ranaut	12 December 2010
58	7	Priyanka Chopra and Shahid Kapoor	19 December 2010
59	8	Amitabh Bachchan and Shweta Bachchan Nanda	26 December 2010
60	9	Shah Rukh Khan	2 January 2011
61	10	Rani Mukerji and Vidya Balan	9 January 2011
62	11	Lara Dutta and Mahesh Bhupathi	16 January 2011
63	12	Hrithik Roshan and Sussanne Khan	23 January 2011
64	13	Ajay Devgn	30 January 2011
65	14	Special Episode	6 February 2011
66	15	Ritesh Deshmukh, Boman Irani, and Sajid Khan	13 February 2011
67	16	Anushka Sharma and Ranveer Singh	20 February 2011
68	17	Madhuri Dixit and Sonakshi Sinha	27 February 2011
69	18	John Abraham	20 March 2011
70	19	Farhan Akhtar and Zoya Akhtar	27 March 2011
71	20	Ekta Kapoor and Tusshar Kapoor	3 April 2011
72	21	Best of Season 3	10 April 2011
73	22	Koffee Awards with Rajeev Masand, Koel Purie Rinchet, Manish Malhotra, and Sarita Tanwar	17 April 2011

=== Season 4 (2013–14) ===
No. overall	No. in season	Guests	Original release date
74	1	Salman Khan and Salim Khan	1 December 2013
75	2	Ranbir Kapoor and Kareena Kapoor Khan	8 December 2013
76	3	Aamir Khan and Kiran Rao	15 December 2013
77	4	Ranveer Singh, Arjun Kapoor, and Shanoo Sharma	22 December 2013
78	5	Sidharth Malhotra, Alia Bhatt, and Varun Dhawan	29 December 2013
79	6	Priyanka Chopra and Deepika Padukone	5 January 2014
80	7	Farhan Akhtar and Vidya Balan	12 January 2014
81	8	Akshay Kumar	19 January 2014
82	9	Emraan Hashmi and Mahesh Bhatt	26 January 2014
83	10	Sonakshi Sinha and Shahid Kapoor	2 February 2014
84	11	Anushka Sharma and Anurag Kashyap	9 February 2014
85	12	Abhishek Bachchan and Farah Khan	16 February 2014
86	13	Juhi Chawla and Madhuri Dixit	23 February 2014
87	14	Freida Pinto and Nargis Fakhri	2 March 2014
88	15	Aditya Roy Kapur and Shraddha Kapoor	9 March 2014
89	16	Kajol and Ayan Mukerji	16 March 2014
90	17	Rohit Shetty and Zoya Akhtar	23 March 2014
91	18	Anil Kapoor and Sonam Kapoor	30 March 2014
92	19	Parineeti Chopra and Alia Bhatt	6 April 2014
93	20	Best of Season 4	13 April 2014

=== Season 5 (2016–17) ===
No. overall	No. in season	Guests	Original release date
94	1	Shah Rukh Khan and Alia Bhatt	6 November 2016
95	2	Akshay Kumar and Twinkle Khanna	13 November 2016
96	3	Arjun Kapoor and Varun Dhawan	20 November 2016
97	4	Ranbir Kapoor and Ranveer Singh	27 November 2016
98	5	Aditya Roy Kapur and Parineeti Chopra	4 December 2016
99 (Note: During the episode, host Karan Johar called it the 100th episode of the show. It is likely that this episode was originally planned to air in that order.)	6	Salman Khan, Arbaaz Khan and Sohail Khan	11 December 2016
100	7	Aamir Khan, Fatima Sana Shaikh, and Sanya Malhotra	18 December 2016
101	8	Katrina Kaif and Anushka Sharma	25 December 2016
102	9	Shahid Kapoor and Mira Rajput Kapoor	1 January 2017
103	10	Sidharth Malhotra and Jacqueline Fernandez	8 January 2017
104	11	Kareena Kapoor Khan and Sonam Kapoor	15 January 2017
105	12	Priyanka Chopra	22 January 2017
106	13	Jackie Shroff and Tiger Shroff	29 January 2017
107	14	Farah Khan and Sania Mirza	5 February 2017
108	15	Varun Dhawan and Alia Bhatt	12 February 2017
109	16	Saif Ali Khan, Kangana Ranaut, and Shahid Kapoor	19 February 2017
110	17	Zoya Akhtar, Kabir Khan, and Imtiaz Ali	26 February 2017
111	18	Kapil Sharma	5 March 2017
112	19	Koffee Awards with Neha Dhupia, Malaika Arora, Ayan Mukerji, and Rohan Joshi	12 March 2017
113	20	Best of Season 5	19 March 2017

=== Season 6 (2018–19) ===
No. overall	No. in season	Guests	Original release date
114	1	Deepika Padukone and Alia Bhatt	21 October 2018
115	2	Akshay Kumar and Ranveer Singh	28 October 2018
116	3	Aamir Khan	4 November 2018
117	4	Katrina Kaif and Varun Dhawan	11 November 2018
118	5	Saif Ali Khan and Sara Ali Khan	18 November 2018
119	6	Arjun Kapoor and Janhvi Kapoor	25 November 2018
120	7	Ajay Devgn and Kajol	2 December 2018
121	8	Badshah and Diljit Dosanjh	9 December 2018
122	9	Ayushmann Khurrana and Vicky Kaushal	16 December 2018
123	10	Prabhas, S. S. Rajamouli and Rana Daggubati	23 December 2018
124	11	Sonam Kapoor, Rhea Kapoor and Harshvardhan Kapoor	30 December 2018
125	12	K. L. Rahul and Hardik Pandya	6 January 2019
126	13	Shahid Kapoor and Ishaan Khatter	13 January 2019
127	14	Abhishek Bachchan and Shweta Bachchan Nanda	20 January 2019
128	15	Rajkummar Rao and Bhumi Pednekar	27 January 2019
129	16	Sidharth Malhotra and Aditya Roy Kapur	3 February 2019
130	17	Kriti Sanon and Kartik Aaryan	10 February 2019
131	18	Tiger Shroff, Tara Sutaria and Ananya Panday	17 February 2019
132	19	Kareena Kapoor Khan and Priyanka Chopra	24 February 2019
133	20	Koffee Awards with Kirron Kher, Malaika Arora, Vir Das and Mallika Dua	3 March 2019
134	21	Unseen Koffee Konfessions	10 March 2019
135	22	A Peek into Celeb Life (Best of Season 6)	17 March 2019

=== Season 7 (2022) ===
No. overall	No. in season	Guests	Original release date
136	1	Ranveer Singh and Alia Bhatt	7 July 2022
137	2	Sara Ali Khan and Janhvi Kapoor	14 July 2022
138	3	Akshay Kumar and Samantha Ruth Prabhu	21 July 2022
139	4	Vijay Deverakonda and Ananya Panday	28 July 2022
140	5	Aamir Khan and Kareena Kapoor Khan	4 August 2022
141	6	Sonam Kapoor and Arjun Kapoor	11 August 2022
142	7	Vicky Kaushal and Sidharth Malhotra	18 August 2022
143 (Note: During the episode, host Karan Johar name-dropped Priyanka Chopra & Kareena Kapoor Khan as the only 2 "Koffee Veterans" apart from Shahid Kapoor who have appeared as guests on the show every season.)	8	Shahid Kapoor and Kiara Advani	25 August 2022
144	9	Kriti Sanon and Tiger Shroff	1 September 2022
145	10	Katrina Kaif, Siddhant Chaturvedi and Ishaan Khatter	8 September 2022
146	11	Anil Kapoor and Varun Dhawan	15 September 2022
147	12	Gauri Khan, Bhavana Panday and Maheep Kapoor	22 September 2022
148	13	Koffee Awards with Tanmay Bhat, Danish Sait, Kusha Kapila and Niharika NM	29 September 2022

=== Season 8 (2023–24) ===
No. overall	No. in season	Guests	Original release date
149	1	Deepika Padukone and Ranveer Singh	26 October 2023
150	2	Sunny Deol and Bobby Deol	2 November 2023
151	3	Sara Ali Khan and Ananya Panday	9 November 2023
152	4	Kareena Kapoor Khan and Alia Bhatt	16 November 2023
153	5	Varun Dhawan and Sidharth Malhotra	23 November 2023
154	6	Rani Mukerji and Kajol	30 November 2023
155	7	Vicky Kaushal and Kiara Advani	7 December 2023
156	8	Aditya Roy Kapur and Arjun Kapoor	14 December 2023
157	9	Ajay Devgn and Rohit Shetty	21 December 2023
158	10	Sharmila Tagore and Saif Ali Khan	28 December 2023
159	11	Janhvi Kapoor and Khushi Kapoor	4 January 2024
160	12	Neetu Singh and Zeenat Aman	11 January 2024
161	13	Koffee Awards with Tanmay Bhat, Danish Sait, Kusha Kapila, Sumukhi Suresh and Orhan Awatramani	18 January 2024

=== Season 9 (2026–27) ===
No. overall	No. in season	Guests	Original release date
162	1	Salman Khan and Karisma Kapoor	14 October 2026
163	2	Rashmika Mandanna and Vijay Deverakonda	21 October 2026
164	3	Varun Dhawan, Janhvi Kapoor and Arjun Kapoor	28 October 2026
165	4	Saif Ali Khan and Kareena Kapoor	4 November 2026
166	5	Sidharth Malhotra and Kiara Advani	11 November 2026
167	6	Ananya Panday, Ananya Birla and Shanaya Kapoor	18 November 2026
168	7	Akshay Kumar and Ravi Kishan	TBA
169	8	Sharvari, Vedang Raina and Lakshya	TBA
170	9	Sara Ali Khan and Ibrahim Ali Khan	TBA
171	10	Alia Bhatt Kapoor and Shaheen Bhatt	TBA

== Specials ==
From time to time, Johar has shot some special episodes (each with a unique title) during breaks between the main seasons to promote the release of then upcoming films and series by Dharma Productions.

Year	Title	Guest(s)	Featured promotion	Ref.
2008	"Date with Dostana"	Priyanka Chopra, John Abraham and Abhishek Bachchan	Promotion of Dostana	
2009	"Date with Sid"	Ranbir Kapoor and Konkona Sen Sharma	Promotion of Wake up Sid	
2009	"Date with Kurbaan"	Saif Ali Khan and Kareena Kapoor Khan	Promotion of Kurbaan	
2010	"Date with Family"	Kajol and Kareena Kapoor Khan	Promotion of We Are Family	
2012	"Date with Ek Main Aur Ekk Tu"	Imran Khan and Kareena Kapoor Khan	Promotion of Ek Main Aur Ekk Tu	
2014	"Date with Humpty & Dulhania"	Varun Dhawan and Alia Bhatt	Promotion of Humpty Sharma Ki Dulhania	
2021	"Koffee Shots with the Empire"	Kunal Kapoor, Dino Morea and Drashti Dhami	Promotion of The Empire	
2021	"Koffee Shots with Atrangi Re"	Dhanush and Sara Ali Khan	Promotion of Atrangi Re	
