= Fazila Aliani =

Pakistani politician, women's rights activist

Fazila Aliani (born 1945) is a veteran politician, women's rights activist and educationist from Balochistan, Pakistan. She was the first woman minister of Balochistan when she was appointed Minister of Health, Education and Social Welfare in 1976. She was also the first woman elected to the Balochistan Assembly in 1972.

== Positions held ==
- 1972-1977: Member Provincial Assembly Baluchistan
- 1976: Provincial Minister of Health, Education and Social Welfare, Balochistan
- 1980-1984: Member Provincial Council Baluchistan
- 1985-1988: Member Provincial Assembly Baluchistan
- Member, Federal Public Service Commission, Islamabad.
- Member, National Commission of Human Rights, Government of Pakistan

== See also ==
- Fazila
