= Fazila Allana =

Indian businesswoman born 1970

- Born: 1970 (age 55–56)
- Education: Queen Mary School; Sydenham College
- Occupation: Indian businesswoman
- Employer: UTV

Fazila Allana (born 1970 in South Mumbai) is an Indian businesswoman.

== Early life and career ==
She studied at Queen Mary School and Sydenham College and graduated in 1991. After a couple of years in Oulu, Finland she moved back to Mumbai. There, she joined UTV who asked her to be a part of their Malaysian operations. Finally, she came back to Mumbai and started her own company, Sol Production Pvt. Ltd., in January 2003. She has produced popular shows such as Koffee With Karan, Kya Mast Hai Life, Mai Ka Laal, Nach Baliye and Rakhi Ka Swayamwar. SOL is one of the leading television production houses in India.

== See also ==
- Fazila
