= Star World Premiere HD =

Indian TV channel

- Country: India
- Broadcast area: India
- Network: Disney Star
- Headquarters: Mumbai

Programming
- Language: English
- Picture format: 1080i (HDTV)

Ownership
- Owner: The Walt Disney Company India
- Sister channels: Star World

History
- Launched: 24 September 2013; 12 years ago
- Closed: 15 March 2023; 3 years ago

Star World Premiere HD was a 24-hour Indian English-language television channel, owned by Disney Star. Launched on 24 September 2013, it primarily aired popular shows from the United States and the United Kingdom. It closed on 15 March 2023, along with Star World and Star World HD.

== History ==
Star World Premiere launched in India on 24 September 2013. Broadcasting in HD only, the premium, ad-free channel was available only by A la carte pay television.

The channel was a companion to Star World, to air the latest seasons of popular English shows in India within 24 hours of their US broadcast. As part of the marketing strategies for the channel, premiere episodes of the latest seasons of shows like Glee, Agents of S.H.I.E.L.D., Sleepy Hollow, The Blacklist etc. were aired in India a day before their US broadcast.

In October 2021, it was reported that Star India's this channel along with Star World (India) (both SD and HD feed) would shut down on 30 November 2021, though it was delayed over a year due to delays in implementation of new tariff rules by TRAI. The channel shut down on 15 March 2023.

== International distribution ==
Star World Premiere launched in Sri Lanka in 2015, replacing Star Movies HD. The Sri Lankan market was initially considered to be profitable due to the lack of American programming broadcasters in the country, but the channel was later pulled due to the lack of viewership.

== Programming ==
The channel mainly aired shows from the US, along with a few popular British series. A few of these shows were later aired in syndication on Star World.
