= Smriti Irani =

Indian actress and politician (born 1976)

- Smriti Irani, c. 2024

Union Cabinet Minister
- In office 26 May 2014 – 9 June 2024
- 6 July 2022 – 9 June 2024: Minority Affairs
- 31 May 2019 – 9 June 2024: Women and Child Development
- 5 July 2016 – 7 July 2021: Textiles
- 18 July 2017 – 24 May 2018: Information and Broadcasting
- 26 May 2014 – 5 July 2016: Human Resource Development

Member of Parliament, Lok Sabha
- In office 23 May 2019 – 4 June 2024
- Preceded by: Rahul Gandhi
- Succeeded by: Kishori Lal Sharma
- Constituency: Amethi, Uttar Pradesh

Member of Parliament, Rajya Sabha
- In office 19 August 2011 – 23 May 2019
- Preceded by: Pravin Naik
- Succeeded by: Jugalji Mathurji Thakor
- Constituency: Gujarat

National General Secretary of Bharatiya Janata Party
- Incumbent
- Assumed office 17 August 2026
- President: Nitin Nabin

President of the BJP Mahila Morcha
- In office 24 June 2010 – 24 April 2013
- Preceded by: Kiran Maheshwari
- Succeeded by: Saroj Pandey

Personal details
- Born: Smriti Malhotra; 23 March 1976 (age 50) New Delhi, Delhi, India
- Party: Bharatiya Janata Party
- Spouse: Zubin Irani (m. 2001)
- Children: 3
- Occupation: Actress; politician

Smriti Zubin Irani (née Malhotra; pronounced [ˈsmɾɪt̪i ɪˈɾaːni]; born 23 March 1976) is an Indian actress, politician, fashion model, and television producer. She received widespread acclaim for her role of Tulsi Virani in the soap opera Kyunki Saas Bhi Kabhi Bahu Thi by Ekta Kapoor, which became the most watched show at its time and won her numerous accolades. A member of the Bharatiya Janata Party (BJP), Irani has held various roles within the Indian Union Cabinet. Before entering politics, Irani had a successful career in the entertainment industry. In 2025, after nearly 2 decades away from acting, Irani reprised her role of Tulsi Virani in Kyunki Saas Bhi Kabhi Bahu Thi 2.

Her paternal family includes Punjabi and Marathi heritage, while her maternal family has a Bengali heritage. Irani joined as a BJP karyakarta in 2003 and since then has completed more than 22 years in the BJP. With over three-generation family of party supporters, from her grandfather as a swayamsevak, and mother as a BJP booth activist, it highlights that her relationship with the party is familial.

A prominent leader of Bharatiya Janata Party, she had been a member of the Indian parliament from 2011 to 2024, serving in the Rajya Sabha from Gujarat from 2011 to 2019 and from 2019 to 2024 as a member of the Lok Sabha from the Amethi constituency in Uttar Pradesh. She was also the National President of the BJP Mahila Morcha (the party's women's wing) from 2010 to 2013. Apart from this, Irani has been National Secretary (two terms), National-President Women's Wing and National Executive Member for five terms.

In the 2019 elections, she gained the Amethi constituency by defeating opposition leader Rahul Gandhi, then-president of the Indian National Congress, whose family members had represented the constituency for the previous four decades. She is the only non-Gandhi female politician to have completed five years in Amethi constituency. She subsequently lost the constituency to long time Indian National Congress worker Kishori Lal Sharma in the 2024 elections.

On 17 August 2026, Smriti Irani was appointed as a National General Secretary of the Bharatiya Janata Party (BJP) as part of the party's national leadership team announced by BJP president Nitin Nabin. She was also appointed as the party's General Secretary in-charge of Uttar Pradesh, assigning her organizational responsibility for the state within the BJP. This marked her return to the party's national organizational leadership after serving as a Union minister in the Government of India.

== Early and personal life ==
She was born as Smriti Malhotra, the daughter of a half-Punjabi, half-Marathi Hindu father, Ajay Kumar Malhotra, and a Bengali Hindu mother, Shibani Bagchi. She is the eldest among three sisters. Her mother was a member of Jana Sangh and her grandfather was associated with Rashtriya Swayamsevak Sangh.

She was educated at the Holy Child Auxilium School, New Delhi, which is run by Catholic nuns. Later, she enrolled in School of Open Learning at University of Delhi. In 2019, she revealed that she had written her first year B.Com. exams from that institution, but had not completed the three-year degree course.

In 2001, she married a Parsi businessman, Zubin Irani. In October the same year, the couple had their first child, a son named Zohr. In September 2003, the couple had their second child, a daughter named Zoish. Irani is also a stepmother to Shanelle who is Zubin Irani's daughter from his previous marriage to Mona Irani, a coordinator and former beauty contestant.

In 2018, responding to queries about her faith, she stated that she is a practising Hindu married to a practising Zoroastrian, and that wearing sindoor is her belief as a Hindu.

== Career ==
Often described as the journey of a middle-class woman from ‘bahu’ of Television world, her role as a television actress to becoming the Vice-President of the Bharatiya Janata Party's Maharashtra Youth Wing, Irani's career spans multiple fields, including her early work as a McDonald's employee, Miss India contestant, model, and television personality, before transitioning into a prominent political leader.

Irani began her career with humble beginnings, working at India’s first McDonald’s outlet. She later participated in the Miss India pageant, where she was a top 10 finalist. Irani subsequently entered the television industry, gaining widespread recognition for her role as ‘Tulsi’ in the popular daily soap opera Kyunki Saas Bhi Kabhi Bahu Thi, a character that became widely popular across Indian households and neighbouring countries.

Irani started as a BJP karyakarta in 2003, during her television days. Irani has held and served numerous prominent positions, from being elected as Vice-President of the Maharashtra Youth Wing of BJP, Executive Member of the BJP's Central Committee, National Secretary of BJP, All India President of BJP Mahila Morcha, and elected to the Rajya Sabha as a member from Gujarat. She has served as the Minister of Human Resource Development, Minister of Textiles in the Government of India, and Minister of State (Independent Charge) for Information and Broadcasting. She was also elected to the 17th Lok Sabha and served as Union Cabinet Minister for both the Ministry of Women and Child Development and the Ministry of Minority Affairs.

=== Acting career ===
Irani was one of the participants of the beauty pageant Miss India 1998 but couldn't reach the top 9, along with Gauri Pradhan Tejwani. In 1998, Irani appeared in a song "Boliyan" of the album "Saawan Mein Lag Gayi Aag" with Mika Singh. In 2000, she made her acting début with TV series Aatish and Hum Hain Kal Aaj Aur Kal, both of which aired on Star Plus. Apart from this, she acted in Kavita on DD metro. In 2000, Irani bagged the lead role of Tulsi Virani in Ekta Kapoor's production Kyunki Saas Bhi Kabhi Bahu Thi on Star Plus for which she holds the record of winning five consecutive ITA Award for Best Actress Popular and four Indian Telly Awards. Kyunki.. was the most successful serial at that time, largely attributed to Irani's performance and chemistry with lead actors Amar Upadhyay and Ronit Roy. Irani had a fallout with the producer Ekta Kapoor and she left the show in June 2007 and was replaced by Gautami Kapoor. She made her comeback in May 2008 in a special episode, reconciling with Kapoor. In November 2008, Kyunki came to an end, leading to Irani's decline on TV. Irani's Tulsi avatar became a cultural phenomenon as she was seen as TV's highest paid actress at that time.

In 2002, she played the epic character Sita in Zee TV's Ramayan along with Nitish Bharadwaj In 2006, Irani co-produced the show Thodi Si Zameen Thoda Sa Aasmaan under her banner Ugraya Entertainment and co-produced by Balaji Telefilms. She also played the lead role of Uma in it. In 2007, she produced the TV serial Virrudh for Sony TV and also portrayed the lead character of Vasudha in it. She produced Mere Apne for 9X and portrayed the protagonist alongside Vinod Khanna. She acted in a supporting role in Zee TV's Teen Bahuraaniyaan.

In 2008, Irani along with Sakshi Tanwar hosted the show Yeh Hai Jalwa, a dance based reality show featuring celebrities along with their troops on 9X. In the same year she produced another show on Zee TV, Waaris which ended in 2009. In 2009, she appeared in a comedy show Maniben.com, aired on SAB TV. She also co-produced the show in collaboration with Contiloe Entertainment. In 2012, she worked in Bengali movie Amrita.

In 2025, Irani returned to screen as her much loved character Tulsi Virani in Kyunki Saas Bhi Kabhi Bahu Thi 2 on StarPlus.

=== The Cultural and Global Impact of Kyunki Saas Bhi Kabhi Bahu Thi ===
From the character ‘Tulsi’, Irani’s name resonated almost with every household and people to could easily connect with the character and the storyline. It was the most popular character in the Television serial. The character ‘Tulsi’ was sensation as was the soap opera Kyunki Saas Bhi Kabhi Bahu Thi. There have been many records created while this serial was telecasted. Kyunki Saas Bhi Kabhi Bahu Thi was the first serial in the Television history of India to surpass 1000+ episodes to air. It maintained highest TRP (Target rating point) for consecutive 5 weeks in a row. The show was aired on Star Plus for 8 years and re-release had viewership of 77 million and is a world record in the entertainment industry.

Kyunki Saas Bhi Kabhi Bahu Thi was an Indian drama aired on StarPlus and later in Afghanistan from 2002 to 2010. The show was dubbed into Dari and broadcast on TOLO (TV Channel). It became the most popular television show in Afghan history. It is credited with driving a significant increase in the sales of generator sets and causing absences from religious functions that coincided with its airtime. The show captured the public imagination in Afghanistan to such an extent that, in this deeply conservative Islamic society where family issues are often kept private, it became the dominant topic of discussion around family matters. There were even reports of wedding banquets being interrupted so that guests could gather around the television for a half-hour to watch the show.

The show had a profound and complex cultural impact in Afghanistan. The show significantly influenced attitudes towards women, family values, and entertainment practices. It had played a crucial role in bringing people together and promoting shared culture in Afghanistan. TV show influenced the perception of women's roles and rights in Afghanistan, especially among the younger generation. The family struggles, love, and relationships portrayed in the show have helped the audience remain connected to their culture. The show have promoted a sense of strong family bonds and cooperation. The strong and self-reliant female characters portrayed in these shows helped empower women and encouraged them to speak up for their rights. Afghans were able to relate to and connect with the traditional values portrayed in the serial.

=== Political career ===
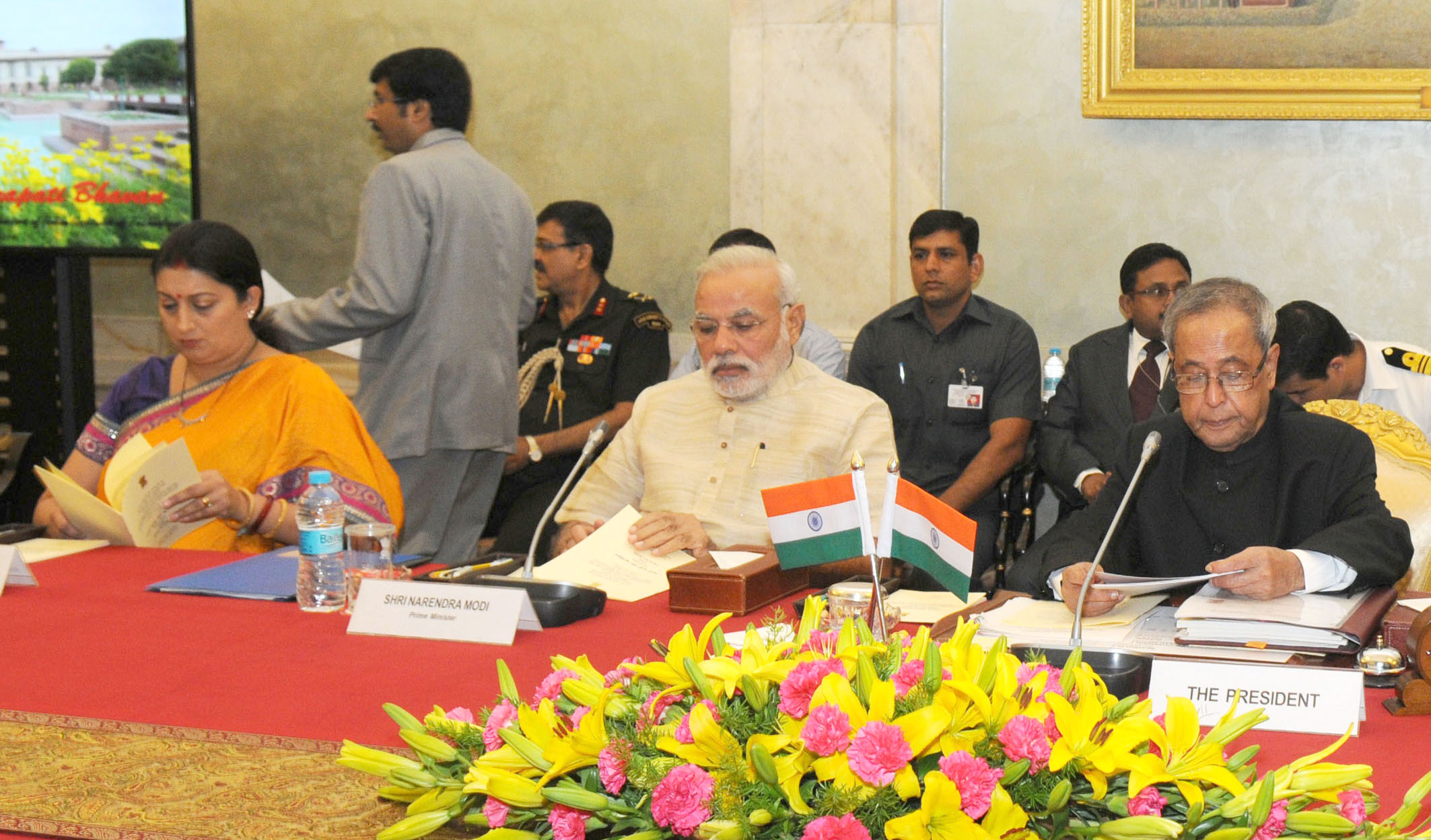
Irani, Prime Minister Narendra Modi and former President Pranab Mukherjee at the Conference of Chairmen of Boards of Governors, and Directors of IITs at Rashtrapati Bhawan on 22 August 2014.

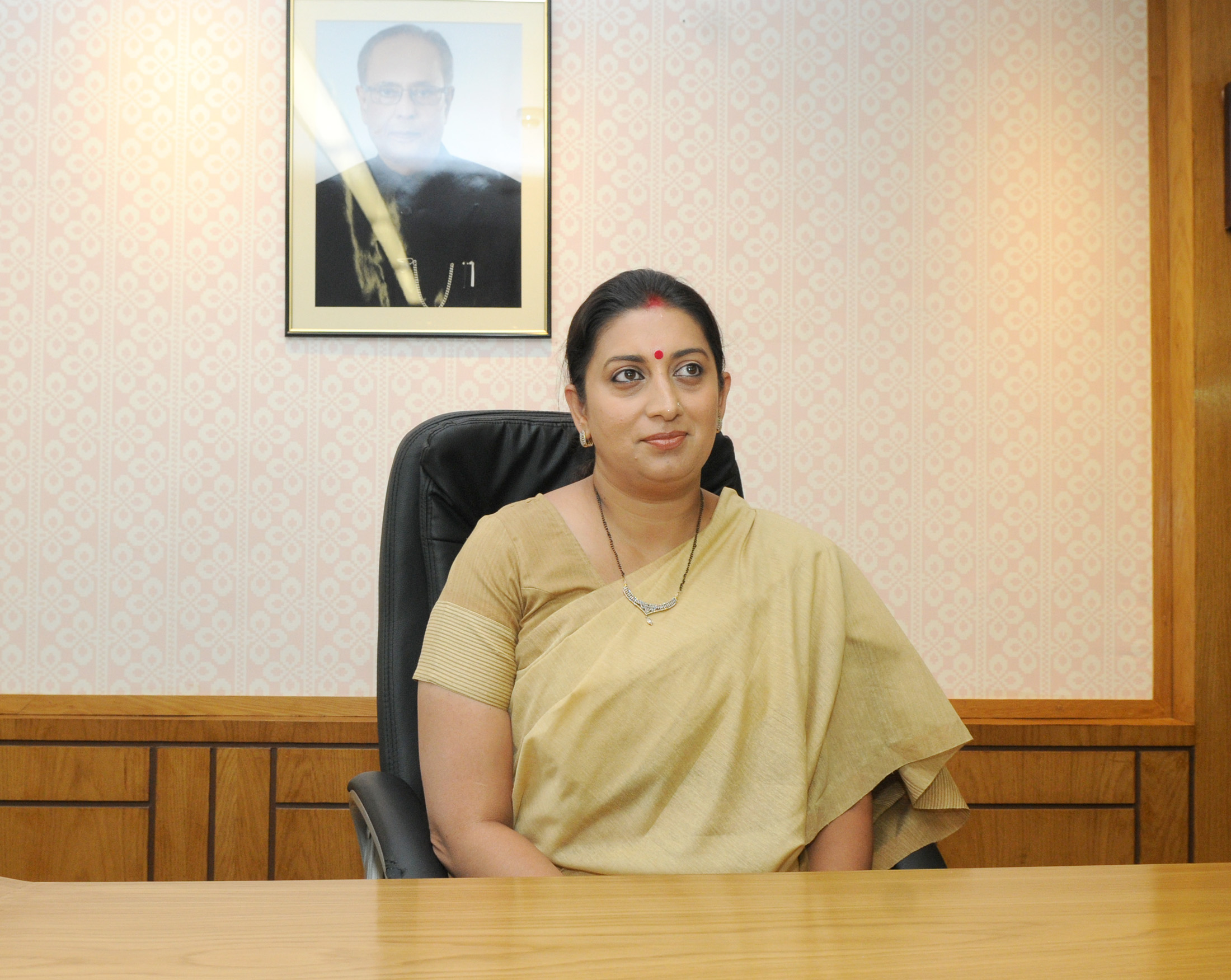
Irani taking charge as the Union Minister for Human Resource Development, in New Delhi on 27 May 2014

Irani joined the Bharatiya Janata Party in 2003. The following year, she was appointed vice-president of the Maharashtra Youth Wing in 2004. In the general elections held that year for the 14th Lok Sabha, she contested unsuccessfully against Kapil Sibal from the Chandni Chowk constituency in Delhi. That election witnessed a shock defeat for the incumbent Vajpayee government. In December 2004, Irani, blaming then Gujarat Chief Minister, Narendra Modi for BJP's electoral losses, threatened to fast unto death until he resigned. She retracted this demand after the BJP's central leadership threatened to take action against her.

Irani was nominated as executive member of the central committee of the BJP. During the campaign for the 2009 parliamentary elections, while campaigning for Vijay Goel in the New Delhi constituency, Irani voiced her concern for women's safety in the city and advocated capital punishment for rapists as a deterrent. In early 2010, Irani was appointed National Secretary of BJP and on 24 June, she was appointed All India President of the BJP's women's wing, BJP Mahila Morcha. As National President of BJP Women's Wing, she successfully pursued Permanent Commission for Women in the Indian Army by facilitating legal aid to women officers who held temporary commission and were agitating for permanent commission.

In August 2011, Irani finally entered parliament. She was sworn in as a member of parliament from Gujarat to the Rajya Sabha.

Irani contested the 2014 general elections against Rahul Gandhi in Amethi constituency of Uttar Pradesh. Irani lost to Gandhi by 1,07,923 votes, a 12.32% margin. On 26 May 2014, Prime Minister Narendra Modi appointed her as the Minister of Human Resource Development in his cabinet. Her appointment was criticised by many people owing to her lack of formal higher education.

Irani has been accused of misrepresenting her educational qualifications. Conflicting affidavits were allegedly submitted by her while filing for different elections. In June 2015, a lower court held that the allegations against Irani were maintainable and a delay in prosecution was not a valid reason for dismissal. Irani asked people to file a PIL about her educational qualification to know about the truth behind the affidavit controversy.

Irani implemented various reforms in universities during her term as HRD minister. Irani made a speech in Parliament in which she discussed the 2016 JNU sedition controversy and the Suicide of Rohith Vemula. University of Hyderabad doctor Rajashree M contradicted some claims made by Irani regarding the circumstances of Rohith's death.

She announced to start new yoga departments in six new universities in June 2016.

In July 2016, in a cabinet reshuffle Irani was shuffled to the Ministry of Textiles from MHRD.

In July 2017, she was handed the additional charge of Ministry of Information and Broadcasting (India) when former Minister Venkaiah Naidu resigned from the ministry to take part in vice-presidential elections.

In 2019, Irani became a member of parliament for Amethi constituency after winning the Lok Sabha seat in the 2019 general elections from Rahul Gandhi. In the 2024 elections Irani lost to Congress Loyalist Kishore Lal Sharma in Amethi by a margin of 1,67,196 votes.

In August 2026, Irani was appointed National General Secretary of the Bharatiya Janata Party (BJP). As part of the same organizational reshuffle, she was designated General Secretary in-charge of Uttar Pradesh. The appointment marked her return to a senior organizational role within the party after serving in the Union government.

==== Political Timeline ====
— 2026 : Appointed National General Secretary of the Bharatiya Janata Party and General Secretary in-charge of Uttar Pradesh.
— 2024 : She lost parliamentary constituency Amethi.
— 2022 : Union Cabinet Minister, Ministry of Minority Affairs.
— 2019 : Elected to the 17th Lok Sabha. Union Cabinet Minister, Ministry of Women and Child Development.
— 2017 : Minister of State (Independent Charge) of Information and Broadcasting from 18 July 2017 to 14 May 2018.
— 2016 : Became Minister of Textiles in the Government of India.
— 2014 : Contested Loksabha Elections from Amethi against Rahul Gandhi. Became Minister of Human Resource Development. She also served as a Member of the Committee on Coal and Steel, Parliamentary Forum on Disaster Management, and Consultative Committee for the Ministry of Urban Development.
— 2012 : Appointed a member of the Indian Parliamentary delegation to the 126th General Assembly of the Inter-Parliamentary Union (IPU) in Kampala, Uganda.
— 2011 : Elected to the Rajya Sabha as a member from Gujarat.
— 2010 : Appointed National Secretary of BJP. Became All India President of BJP's women's wing, BJP Mahila Morcha.
— 2004 : Became vice-president of the Maharashtra Youth Wing of BJP. Contested Delhi Assembly Elections from Chandni Chowk constituency. Inducted into the Central Committee of BJP as executive member despite losing the election.
— 2003 : She joined the Bharatiya Janata Party's Maharashtra wing.

=== Comeback on Television ===
In July 2025, Irani made her return to television after 17 years, reprising her iconic role as Tulsi Virani in the reboot of Kyunki Saas Bhi Kabhi Bahu Thi 2. The new series premiered on Star Plus on 29 July 2025 at 10:30 pm and is also available on JioHotstar. The series concluded on 20 October 2026.

== Work undertaken as Union Minister ==
Irani was the youngest minister in the cabinet of Narendra Modi. She was also the first woman to hold office as the Union Minister for Human Resource Development and Union Minister of Textiles. She was also the youngest woman to be nominated to the Rajya Sabha. Some of her key achievements in various portfolios held by her have been listed below:

=== As Union Minister for Human Resource Development (May 2014–July 2016) ===
In her term as the HRD minister, Irani undertook a number of decisions which helped in improving the quality, inclusivity and outcome of education in the country. Some of the key achievements have been listed as under:

1. The Global Initiative of Academic Networks (GIAN) was launched by the Minister post the retreat of IITs in 2014. The network is an initiative within the Higher Education sector aimed at tapping the talent pool of scientists and entrepreneurs, internationally to encourage their engagement with the institutes of Higher Education in India so as to augment the country's existing academic resources, accelerate the pace of quality reform, and elevate India's scientific and technological capacity to global excellence.
2. Udaan Yojana and Pragati Scheme launched in 2014 by Irani aims to address the low enrolment of girls in engineering colleges. The scheme has been designed to provide a comprehensive platform to deserving girl students who aspire to pursue higher education in engineering and assist them in preparing for the IIT-JEE while studying in Classes XI and XII. By 2016, 143 of the 300 girls under the scheme had cleared JEE. In the same year the Pragati Scheme was launched in order to provide financial support and encouragement to female students to pursue technical education.
3. Know Your College Portal was launched in the year 2014 for helping a prospective student make a value judgement with regard to the selection of an appropriate college for pursuing higher education by providing the necessary information about the college.
4. The IMPacting Research INnovation and Technology (IMPRINT) India Scheme, brainchild of Irani was launched by the former President, Pranab Mukherjee and Prime Minister Narendra Modi in 2015. It is the first of its kind MHRD supported Pan-IIT + IISc joint initiative to address the major science and engineering challenges that India must address and champion to enable, empower and embolden the nation for inclusive growth and self-reliance. Within a year of its launch 31 ministries and government departments have proposed to co-fund 229 research projects worth Rs 59,589 lakh at IITs and other premier Indian research institutes.
5. National institute Ranking Framework is an indigenous ranking framework for higher educational institutions launched by Irani in 2015, It will now allow the students seeking admission into colleges to assess the performance and quality level of different colleges.
6. SWAYAM (Study Webs of Active Learning for Young Aspiring Minds), launched in the year 2016 by Irani is a Massive Open Online Courses (MOOCS) platform, which aims at providing online courses, study material and course registration. It has been designed to achieve the three cardinal principles of Education Policy viz., access, equity and quality. It further aims to bridge the digital divide for students who have hitherto remained untouched by the digital revolution and have not been able to join the mainstream of the knowledge economy.
7. Veer Gatha series was launched by the HRD ministry under the leadership of Irani in the year 2016 as an initiative to take the stories of India's bravest of the brave soldiers to young school children and inspire them.

=== Union Minister for Textiles (July 2016–July 2021) ===
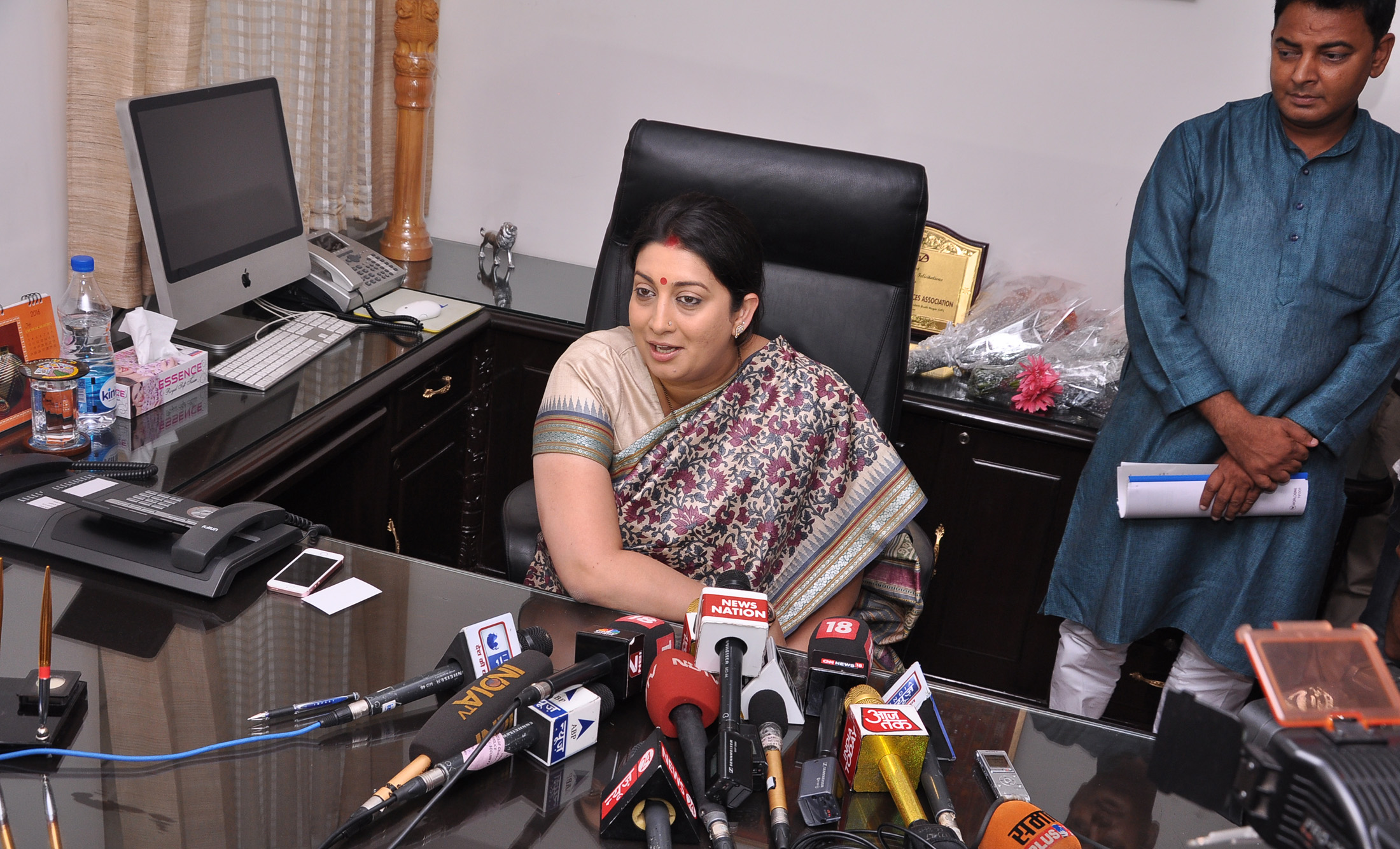
Irani addressing media on taking charge as Union Textiles Minister in New Delhi on 6 July 2016

In July 2016, Irani was given charge of the Textiles Ministry, taking over from Santosh Kumar Gangwar. She held that portfolio for a full five years, until July 2021, having been re-appointed to the position after the parliamentary elections of 2019. Her contribution to the sector has been appreciated by various industry bodies like the textile council TEXPROCIL, the Clothing Manufacturers Association of India and the Indian Texpreneurs Federation (ITF). Her significant initiatives as Minister of Textiles include:

1. Apparel Sector Special Package launched in the year 2018, is a Rs. 6,000 crore worth of package launched by Irani in 2016, aimed at strengthening the entire textile industry by providing financial support to small scale players in the industry.
2. Support for Technical Textile, in a bid to fulfil the long-standing demand of the industry, in January 2019, Irani declare technical textile items as a separate category and declared that the government had notified 207 HSN codes as technical textiles. The said move is expected to benefit 900 million farmers in the country and will help the industry to grow over Rs 2 trillion (short scale) in the tech textile sector and help the potential investors to enter into technical textiles.
3. Special focus on the North Eastern Regions, during the first term of her tenure as the Minister of Textiles, 21 readymade garment manufacturing units in the north eastern region had been made functional. Special initiatives were taken to further push sericulture in the region, for which Rs. 690 crore had been earmarked.
4. Silk Samagra Workshop was launched by Irani in 2018, which is an Integrated Scheme for Development of Silk Industry for 3 years from 2017 to 2020. The main objective of the scheme is to maintain Breeders stock, Breed improvement through R&D Projects, Development of mechanised practices, Technology translation through Sericulture Information Linkages and Knowledge System (SILKS) Portal, Mobile Application for Stakeholders and for seed quality monitoring.
5. Samarth Scheme, is an aspirational initiative launched by Irani in her second term as the Union Minister for Textiles. The ministry has envisaged an expenditure of over Rs. 1,300 crore to upskill over 4 lakh workers in 16 states.

=== Union Minister for Information and Broadcasting (July 2017–May 2018) ===
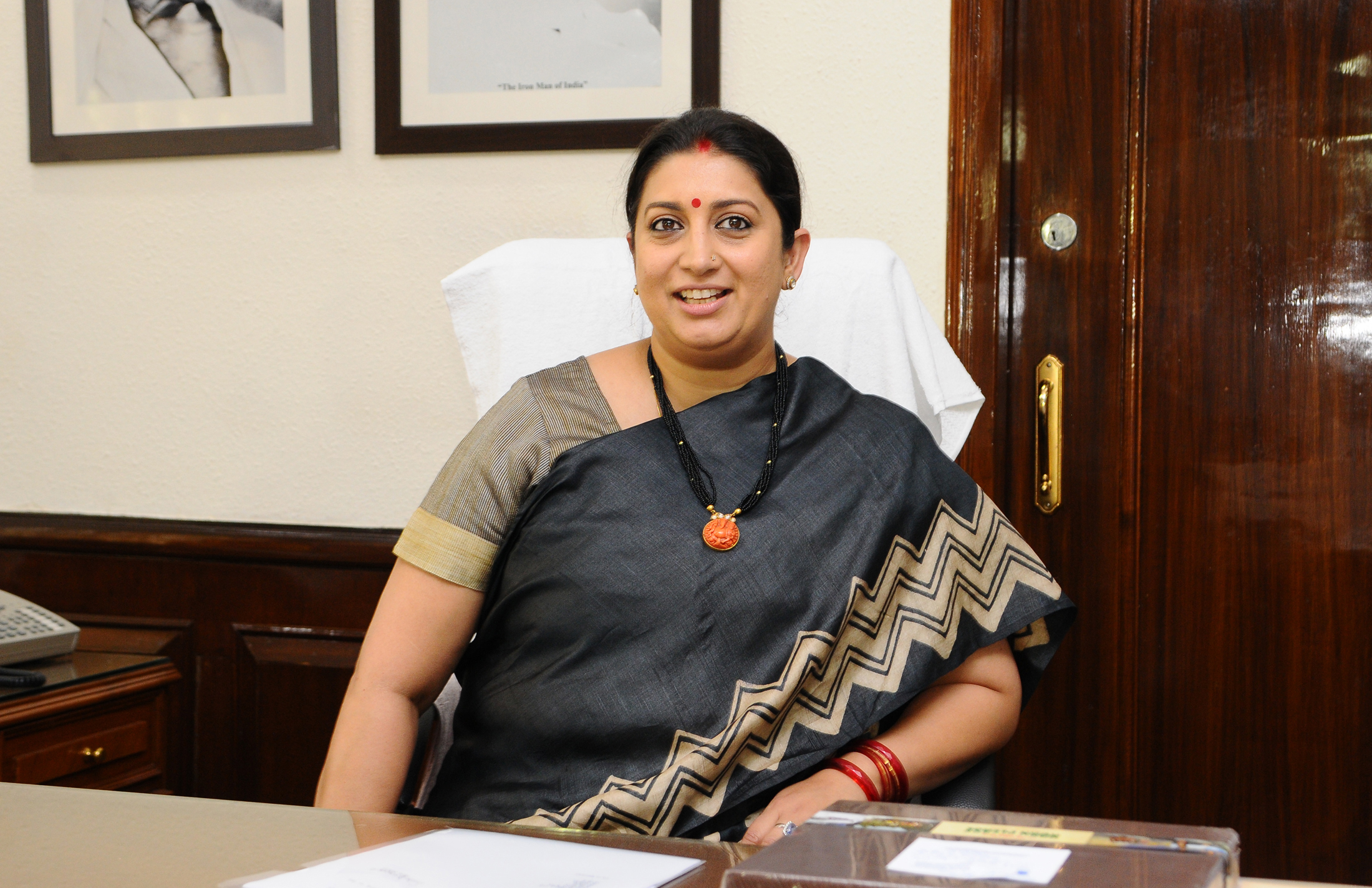
Irani takes charge as the Minister of Information & Broadcasting, in New Delhi on 18 July 2017.

1. The 48th edition of the International Film Festival of India (IFFI) was held under her watch in November 2017. For the first time, under the Accessible India Campaign of the Government of India, cinematic works were presented in audio-described format for the visually impaired. Film star Shah Rukh Khan expressed his admiration in these words: "Great endeavour by I&B Minister Smriti Irani to make IFFI the most inclusive, relevant forum for Indian cinema. My unwavering support to you". The event was a star studded one, with Sridevi, AR Rahman, Shahid Kapoor and Vishal Bhardwaj and many other stars registering their presence at the event.
2. In FY 2017, during Mrs. Irani's term as I&B Minister, the revenue of State-run broadcaster Doordarshan rose to Rs 827.51 crore, surpassing its target of Rs 800 crore.

=== Union Minister for Women and Child Developments (May 2019–June 2024) ===
In the second term of the Modi Government, Irani was appointed given the key portfolio Union Minister for Women and Child Development. Subsequently, in the cabinet re-shuffle of July 2021, Irani was again given the charge of the Ministry of Women and Child Development.

One of her first legislative initiatives as the Minister for WCD was the Amendment to the Protection of Children from Sexual Offences (POCSO) Act, 2019, which aims to make punishment more stringent and even include death penalty for offenders involved in sexual crimes against minors. She undertook the initiative to define "child pornography" and reiterated a "zero tolerance" stance against the crime.

Bharatiya Poshan Krishi Kosh, As part of the Poshan Abhiyaan, Irani along with Bill Gates, through his foundation, announced the launch of India's first Poshan Atlas, Bhartiya Poshan Krishi Kosh(BPKK) in order to create a repository of diverse crops across 127 agro-climatic zones of the country.

=== Union Minister for Minority Affairs (July 2022 - June 2024) ===
In August 2023, Irani introduced ‘Naya Savera’ scheme (‘Free Coaching and Allied’ scheme) to assist students belonging to the six minority communities namely Sikh, Jain, Muslim, Christian, Buddhist and Parsi by way of special coaching for qualifying examinations for admission in technical/professional courses and competitive examination for recruitment.

In January 2024, Irani became the only non-muslim on her historical visit to the holy site of Medina led by the Saudi-Arabian delegates, where she signed the Hajj agreement 2024, and brought home increased quota for Hajj trip for Muslims in India.

== MP from Amethi ==
Irani, in 2019 general elections, in Amethi constituency of Uttar Pradesh, won against Rahul Gandhi, President of the Indian National Congress, by a margin of 55,120 votes who previously seat held since 2004. The Bharatiya Janata Party (BJP) and its leadership put in an all around effort over the past five years to ensure this win after her loss to Gandhi by 1,07,923 votes, a 12.32% margin in 2014 general elections. Irani made multiple visits to Amethi after her loss to launch central development schemes in the constituency, to underscore her message that she would provide better representation than the incumbent member. In the 2024 general elections however, Irani lost the Amethi seat to the Indian National Congress' candidate Kishori Lal Sharma by a margin of 167,196 votes.

== Degree issues ==
=== Undergraduate degree ===
Irani was accused of providing contradictory affidavits about her educational qualifications during different elections. In her affidavit for the 2004 Lok Sabha elections, she reportedly stated her educational qualification as B.A. from Delhi University. However, while filing affidavits in her nomination papers for Rajya Sabha from Gujarat in 2011 and Lok Sabha from Uttar Pradesh in 2014, she said her highest educational qualification was, B.com, Part 1 from School of Open Learning at University of Delhi.

She later claimed that she has done B.com, Part 1 from Delhi University (not completing the full course till Part 3) in the affidavit she filed for Rajya Sabha elections from Gujarat in 2017 which stated "Bachelor of Commerce, Part 1. Three year degree course not completed".

A freelance writer Ahmer Khan filed a complaint in April 2015 that Irani had filed an affidavit in April 2004 for the Lok Sabha elections, stating that she had completed her Bachelor of Arts in 1996 from School of Correspondence (Delhi University) but in another affidavit of 16 April 2014, filed by her for the Lok Sabha polls, it was said that she was a Bachelor of Commerce Part-I from the School of Open Learning (Delhi University). The plea said that the facts and circumstances reveal commission of offences by Irani under section 125A (which deals with penalty of filing false affidavit and entails a jail term) of the Representation of People Act, 1951.

The court had on 20 November 2016 allowed the complainant's plea seeking direction to the officials of EC and DU to bring the records of Ms. Irani's qualifications after he said he was unable to place them before the court. During the hearings of the complaint, the court was told by a poll panel official that the documents filed by Ms. Irani regarding her educational qualification while filing nominations were not traceable. Also, in pursuance of the court's earlier direction, Delhi University had also submitted that the documents pertaining to Ms. Irani's BA course in 1996, as purportedly mentioned by her in an affidavit filed during 2004 Lok Sabha elections, were yet to be found.

On 18 October 2016, a Delhi court said that Irani will not be summoned for the fake degree case because the petition filed against Irani questioning her college degrees was an attempt to harass her. The court said that the complainant may not have filed it if she were not a central minister. Metropolitan Magistrate Harvinder Singh said that original evidence had already been lost due to the passage of years, secondary evidence wasn't enough for court. The Magistrate also said that the complainant made a "delay of 11 years" in filing the complaint against Irani. This verdict of the lower court was challenged in the Delhi High Court and the court asked all the records of the case to be handed over to it in order to examine case records before deciding to summon Irani or anyone else.

== Electoral history ==
=== Lok Sabha Elections ===
| Elections | Lok Sabha | Constituency | Political party | Result | Vote percentage | Opposition | | |
| Elections | Lok Sabha | Constituency | Political party | Result | Vote percentage | Candidate | Political party | Vote percentage |
|---|---|---|---|---|---|---|---|---|
| 2004 | 14th | Chandni Chowk | BJP | Lost | 26.80% | Kapil Sibal | INC | 71.17% |
| 2014 | 16th | Amethi | BJP | Lost | 34.38% | Rahul Gandhi | INC | 46.71% |
| 2019 | 17th | Amethi | BJP | Won | 49.71% | Rahul Gandhi | INC | 43.84% |
| 2024 | 18th | Amethi | BJP | Lost | 37.94% | Kishori Lal Sharma | INC | 54.99% |

=== Rajya Sabha Elections ===
Rajya Sabha
| Term | State | Party | Notes |
|---|---|---|---|
| 2011–2017 | Gujarat | BJP | First term, elected in August 2011 |
| 2017–2019 | Gujarat | BJP | Second term, resigned in May 2019 After winning the Lok Sabha seat from Amethi Parliamentary Constituency |

== Filmography ==
=== Television ===
| Year | Show | Character |
|---|---|---|
| 1999 | Aatish | Younger twin sister |
| 2000–2008 | Kyunki Saas Bhi Kabhi Bahu Thi | Tulsi Virani |
| 2000 | Hum Hain Kal Aaj Aur Kal | |
| 2000 | Kavita | Kavita |
| 2001–2003 | Kya Hadsaa Kya Haqeeqat | Smriti |
| 2001–2002 | Ramayan | Sita |
| 2003 | Kuch... Diiil Se | Host |
| 2005 | Kaun Banega Crorepati 2 | Contestant |
| 2005 | Koffee with Karan | Guest |
| 2006–2007 | Thodi Si Zameen Thoda Sa Aasmaan | Uma |
| 2007–2008 | Virrudh | Vasudha Sharma |
| 2007–2008 | Mere Apne | Sharda |
| 2007–2008 | Teen Bahuraaniyaan | Vrinda Desai |
| 2008 | Yeh Hai Jalwa | Host |
| 2008 | Waaris | Producer |
| 2009–2010 | Maniben.com | Maniben Patel |
| 2012 | Savdhaan India | Host |
| 2013 | Ek Thhi Naayka | Swati |
| 2025–2026 | Kyunki Saas Bhi Kabhi Bahu Thi 2 | Tulsi Virani |

=== Theatre projects ===
| Projects | Language | Character |
|---|---|---|
| Kuch Tum Kaho Kuch Hum Kahein | Hindi | Sargam |
| Maniben.com | Gujarati | Mani |
| Koi Taru Bau Saru Thayu | Gujarati | Devika |
| Muktidhaam | Gujarati | Mother |
| Garv Thi Kaho Ame Gujarati Chhiye | Gujarati | Mridula |
| Jai Bolo Telangana | Telugu | Mother |

=== Films ===
| Year | Film | Character | Language |
|---|---|---|---|
| 2010 | Malik Ek | Dwarkamai | Hindi |
| 2011 | Jai Bolo Telangana | Activist | Telugu |
| 2012 | Amrita | Amrita | Bengali |

== Other work ==
Irani's debut novel is Lal Salaam, published by Westland publishers in 2021. It is inspired by the April 2010 Maoist attack in Dantewada and the role of the central police forces in insurgencies.

She is the founder of the Alliance for Global Good – Gender Equity and Equality, a World Economic Forum initiative aligned with BIMSTEC and G20, focused on addressing social and economic disparities through gender-focused programs. As a Strategic Advisor to the Confederation of All India Traders (CAIT), she represents the interests of 80 million small traders in India. She also serves as an Advisory Board Member for the Women’s Collective Forum, dedicated to promoting gender equality and advancing women’s health, education, and entrepreneurship. Additionally, she is the Vice-President of The Loomba Foundation, which supports widows and their children globally, regardless of race, gender, or religion. She has also represented the Asia-Pacific Region at the 126th Inter-Parliamentary Union Assembly.

== Awards ==
Rajya Sabha
| Preceded by Pravin Naik | Member of Parliament for Rajya Sabha Gujarat; 19 August 2011 – 23 May 2019 | Succeeded by Vacant |
Lok Sabha
| Preceded by Rahul Gandhi | Member of Parliament for Amethi; 23 May 2019 — Incumbent | Incumbent |
Political offices
| Preceded by Pallam Raju | Minister of Human Resource Development; 26 May 2014 – 5 July 2016 | Succeeded by Prakash Javadekar |
| Preceded by Santosh Gangwar; Minister of State with Independent charge | Minister of Textiles; 5 July 2016 – 7 July 2021 | Succeeded by Piyush Goyal |
| Preceded by Venkaiah Naidu | Minister of Information and Broadcasting; 18 July 2017 – 14 May 2018 | Succeeded by Rajyavardhan Singh Rathore; Minister of State with Independent charge |
| Preceded by Maneka Gandhi | Minister of Women and Child Development; 30 May 2019 – present | Incumbent |
| Preceded by Mukhtar Abbas Naqvi | Minister of Minority Affairs; 6 July 2022 – present | Incumbent |
