= Fazila =

Fazila is a feminine given name. Notable people with the name include:

- Fazila Aliani (born 1945), Pakistani activist and politician
- Fazila Allana (born 1970), Indian businesswoman
- Fazila Kaiser, Pakistani actress, producer, writer, and chef
- Fazila Samadova (1929–2020), Azerbaijani scientist
