= Koffee with Karan =

Indian talk show

- Genre: Talk show
- Directed by: Seasons 1–3: Ravina Kohli; Season 4: Akshat Rao; Season 5: Fazila Allana; Seasons 6–7: Jahnvi Obhan
- Presented by: Karan Johar
- Theme music composer: Salim–Sulaiman
- Country of origin: India
- Original languages: English; Hindi
- No. of seasons: 8
- No. of episodes: 147 + 6 specials (list of episodes)

Production
- Executive producers: Seasons 1–6: Tatum D'Souza Shruti Rajkumar; Season 4: Romit Ranjan Gupta; Season 5: Ujjwala Dutt; Season 7: Karan Johar Apoorva Mehta Aneesha Baig
- Producers: Seasons 1–6: Fazila Allana Kamna Nirula Menezes; Season 7: Jetendra S. Vaje
- Editor: Lionel Fernandes
- Camera setup: Multi-camera
- Running time: 40–66 minutes
- Production companies: SOL India (seasons 1–6); Dharmatic Entertainment (season 7–8)

Original release
- Network: Star World (seasons 1–6); Star One (season 2) (Note: Simulcast airing along with Star World.); Disney+ Hotstar (season 7–8) (Note: As a Hotstar Special.)
- Release: 19 November 2004 – present

Koffee with Karan is an Indian talk show hosted by filmmaker and television personality Karan Johar and produced by Dharmatic Entertainment, the digital content division of Johar's production company Dharma Productions. (Note: Previously produced by SOL India for the first six seasons (2004–2019).) It debuted on 19 November 2004, and has aired eight seasons over a span of eighteen years. Distributed by Disney Star, its first six seasons aired on Star World India (2004–2019). (Note: The second season was simulcast on Star One (2007).) In 2022, Koffee with Karan moved to Disney+ Hotstar as a streaming exclusive under the service's content label and hub, Hotstar Specials; thereafter the succeeding seasons have aired on the platform. Also that year, Johar's Dharmatic Entertainment replaced Banijay's SOL India as the show's production company. It is the second longest-running talk show after Phool Khile Hain Gulshan Gulshan on Indian Hindi-language television, as well as one of the most-watched Indian English-language television shows. In 2007, the show won an Indian Television Academy Award for Best Talk Show and Johar won Best Talk Show Anchor.

== Background ==
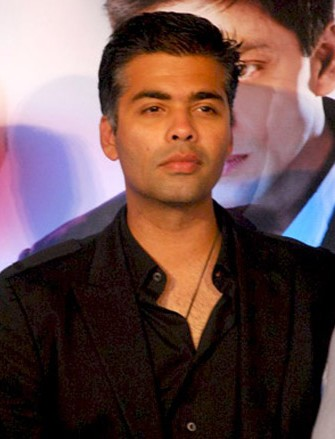
Host Karan Johar was credited with naming the show.

Koffee with Karan was produced by Fazila Allana and Kamna Nirula Menezes. The producers were involved with the Star Parivaar Awards in 2004 and approached Karan Johar about hosting the event. He declined the offer, stating "I don't mind anchoring a show, but I'd rather [sic] it was a chat show." The idea was pitched to the heads of Star India who, impressed with Johar's hosting skills at the first Zee Cine Awards, ordered the show without a pilot.

According to the producers, the concept of the show revolves around "spilling the beans while having a hot cuppa." They have stated that Johar is "the brain behind the show" and that he "sits on everything". About hosting a television chat show, Johar says, "I chat all the time, on the phone, at parties. I decided, might as well get paid for all the talking".

The show quickly became popular, becoming the number one show for Star World India in 2005. Only Zee Café's syndication of Friends beat Koffee with Karan in ratings in 2005. This meant that the talk show was the top Indian English language television show that year. Originally targeted at the 15–34 years age group, the show found approval from outside that range of viewers. The popularity prompted Star India to relaunch the show on Star One in 2005 and in later seasons, simulcast on it altogether.

Koffee with Karan was noted for its uniqueness, especially that of Johar's style of hosting. Its success is credited, in particular, to the fact that it is able to "rope in some of [the] biggest names in the Indian entertainment industry". Most of his guests Johar considers his friends and he mentions that due to that relationship, he has to "strike a balance between being over-cautious and over-friendly". In what is called his "trademark chatty manner", Johar is seen "coaxing [the guests], cajoling them and grilling them" and it is indeed "their confessions and revelations" that generate the most media attention. Specifically the rapid fire segment of the show has garnered the most notoriety, being dubbed "infamous" for the statements made during the round which are often revealing.

=== Regular segments ===
==== Rapid Fire ====
The Rapid Fire segment includes a quick question-and-answer interview with Johar asking each guest a similar set of questions. Guests are encouraged to speak their mind and make the answers "rapid and full of fire". While no score is shown to the guests or the public, slow answers and/or passing on answering a question is usually penalised. The winner of the Rapid Fire round is given a gift hamper which includes personalised roasted coffee, a Koffee mug, some edible items like cookies and candies, and some electronic gadgets. Additionally, in season 6, the Answer of the Season award was introduced with the winner, to be announced at the end of the season, receiving an Audi A5 Sportback as an incentive for guests to be wittier in their answers. While the segment is the most anticipated by the fans, it has gained infamy among guests and in the media because it "often brings out the irreverent side of the [guests]".

==== Opinions ====
Often the show featured this segment which allowed the guests to hear the opinions of others. Opinions could come from the public and/or other Bollywood personalities. Unlike the Rapid Fire, Opinions did not have a regular time slot in a given episode and could be featured at any point during it. The regular segment became recurring by the run of season 4. A similar segment, titled Friends Like These, was introduced in season 6 which features people close to each guest describing the guest and/or sharing an anecdote about them.

==== Koffee Quiz ====
Introduced in season 4, in Koffee Quiz, Johar asks a mix of Bollywood-based and general knowledge questions to his guests, who go head to head against each other. Each right answer is awarded a point and, at the end of the round, the winner gets a uniquely-wrapped gift. In season 4, buzzers decided which guest gets to answer a question but was replaced in season 5 with noises made by each guest. The game was revamped for season 6 with the introduction of a "gaming zone" - a separate section on the show's set positioned behind the couch area; buzzers were brought back which are mounted on two podiums facing each other. The Koffee Quiz is regularly featured following the Rapid Fire round, at the end of the show, except for episodes featuring only a single guest.

== History ==
Koffee with Karan premiered on 19 November 2004 on Star World with guests Shah Rukh Khan and Kajol, the lead pair from Johar's two most recent directorial ventures, Kuch Kuch Hota Hai (1998) and Kabhi Khushi Kabhie Gham (2001). Khan made his third appearance (second as the featured guest) in the season finale alongside Amitabh Bachchan, another co-star from Kabhi Khushi Kabhie Gham. Additional guests for the finale included Kajol, Jaya Bachchan, Sanjay Leela Bhansali, Farhan Akhtar, and Farah Khan.

Season 2 began airing on 11 February 2007 and it was simulcasted on Star One alongside Star World. For the 15th episode of the season, Hollywood actor Richard Gere appeared as the sole guest. The season wrapped up on 16 September 2007 with introduction of the Koffee Awards.

By May 2010, it was confirmed that season 3 was set to air that year. Initially reported to air in July or August, season 3 premiered on 7 November 2010 with guests Aishwarya Bachchan and Abhishek Bachchan. Indian tennis player, Mahesh Bhupathi, appeared alongside his, then-fiancé and now, wife Lara Dutta. He is the first ever sports personality to be featured on the show. The Koffee Awards was brought back for the season 3 finale which aired on 17 April 2011.

On 8 September 2013, Karan Johar told IANS, "Koffee With Karan season 3 will be on air in December. I will start shooting for it in December". Later that month, Salman Khan was confirmed to make his debut in the season premiere which aired on 1 December 2013. The premiere also saw the appearance of Khan's father, veteran screenwriter Salim Khan, who joined him halfway through in the episode. Along with Khan, many other established Bollywood celebrities appeared for the first time this season. They include Aamir Khan, Kiran Rao, Akshay Kumar, Emraan Hashmi, Mahesh Bhatt, Anurag Kashyap, Juhi Chawla, and Rohit Shetty. While the show had retained its primetime slot since the second season, the 14th episode of season 4, featuring India-born Hollywood actress Freida Pinto and Nargis Fakhri, was moved to the late night slot reportedly due to the channel's view that the content "was too bold for prime time viewing". Several celebrities who were regulars in the past, including Rani Mukerji, Hrithik Roshan, Saif Ali Khan, Sanjay Dutt, Ekta Kapoor, John Abraham, and Lara Dutta, did not appear in season four, with the most notable absence being that of Shah Rukh Khan. Both Khan and Saif Ali Khan have since appeared on the show in the following season.

While replying to his followers' tweets on 6 March 2016, Johar revealed that season 5 will be back later that year. On 6 October, Johar confirmed the first episode will air on 6 November 2016 at its usual time slot. The season premiered with Shah Rukh Khan and Alia Bhatt as the featured guests, both having recently worked on Dear Zindagi of which Johar was a producer. Twinkle Khanna made her first appearance on the show that season, appearing alongside her husband Akshay Kumar. Veteran actor Jackie Shroff also made his debut that season, appearing in the 13th episode along with his son, actor Tiger Shroff. Indian tennis player Sania Mirza appeared in the 14th episode, becoming the second sports personality to be on the show. The Koffee Awards, which were not given out in the fourth season, was brought back and aired as the penultimate episode of the season with the finale, a best-of episode, being aired on 19 March 2017.

On 24 April 2018, Johar confirmed season 6 to be out in 2018 breaking the usual trend of a season every three years. On 18 August, Johar tweeted that the season premiere will air on 21 October 2018. On 21 October, the sixth season premiered with Deepika Padukone and Alia Bhatt as guests. In the third episode, Johar competed against guest Aamir Khan in the rapid-fire round, while Malaika Arora appeared as a guest judge. The 10th episode, featuring Prabhas, S. S. Rajamouli and Rana Daggubati from Baahubali, marked the first time stars from Tollywood, the Telugu film industry, appeared on the show. K. L. Rahul and Hardik Pandya, who appeared on the 12th episode, were the first two cricket players to have appeared on the show. On 11 January 2019, the streaming service of Star India, (Note: Now known as Disney Star.) Hotstar (now known as Disney+ Hotstar), removed the episode from their site due to comments made by Pandya during the episode, which were considered "crass, racist, sexist and cringe-worthy" by fans; additionally, Star World India removed all promotional content for the episode from their social media pages. The final episode, which saw the Koffee Awards take place, aired on 3 March 2019 while the season wrapped with two bonus episodes: a deleted scenes compilation and a best-of episode, airing on 10 March and 17 March 2019.

On 4 May 2022, Johar announced on social media using a marketing ploy that the show would be returning for a seventh season as a streaming exclusive on Disney+ Hotstar, under the service's content hub, Hotstar Specials, with his studio's digital content subsidiary, Dharmatic Entertainment, taking over as the show's production company. On 19 June 2022, he revealed that the seventh season would premiere on 7 July 2022 on the streaming platform. On 30 June 2022, Johar announced the season would air on Hulu in the United States. The seventh season premiered on 7 July 2022 with Ranveer Singh and Alia Bhatt as guests, both having recently worked on Johar's upcoming film, Rocky Aur Rani Kii Prem Kahaani, at the time, and marked the third consecutive time Bhatt appeared on a season premiere. The third episode, which aired on 21 July 2022, with Akshay Kumar and Tollywood actress Samantha Ruth Prabhu as guests, saw the latter's first appearance on the show. The fourth episode featured Tollywood actor Vijay Deverakonda and Ananya Panday as guests, marking the former's debut appearance on Koffee with Karan.

== Awards and nominations ==
=== Indian Television Academy Awards ===
Year	Category	Nominee(s)	Result	Ref.
2007	Best Talk/Chat Show	Koffee with Karan	Won	
2007	Best Talk Show Anchor	Karan Johar	Won	

=== Indian Telly Awards ===
Year	Category	Nominee(s)	Result	Ref.
2005	Best Anchor	Karan Johar	Nominated	
2007	Best Anchor	Karan Johar	Nominated	
2012	Best Anchor	Karan Johar	Nominated	

== Adaptations ==
Title	Years	Language	Ref.
Koffee With DD	2006–17	Tamil	
Coffee with Lahiru and Muditha	2008–12	Sinhala	
