= Star World (India) =

Defunct Indian entertainment channel

Star World India
- Logo used from 2008 to 2023.
- Country: India, Pakistan
- Broadcast area: Indian subcontinent
- Network: Disney Star
- Headquarters: Mumbai

Programming
- Language: English
- Picture format: 1080i HDTV (downscaled to letterboxed 576i for the SDTV feed)

Ownership
- Owner: The Walt Disney Company India
- Sister channels: Disney Star Channels

History
- Launched: 15 December 1991; 34 years ago 15 April 2011; 14 years ago (HD)
- Closed: 15 March 2023; 2 years ago

Links
- Website: Star World on Disney+ Hotstar

Star World (stylized in all capital letters) was an Indian pay television channel owned by The Walt Disney Company India, a company wholly owned by The Walt Disney Company. During its tenure it had mainly telecast shows from multiple Disney-owned studios such as FX Productions, ABC Signature, and 20th Television. Its programming was content that would appeal to the 14 to 35-year-old urban population, with 24-year-old working professionals being its primary target demographic.

== History ==
Star World was first launched in India on 15 December 1991 as a flagship feed of Star World Asia. Then known as StarPlus, it was the product of a partnership between Star TV and Zee Telefilms. In order to avoid competition within, the contract between the two conglomerates clearly encased the territories of operation for both networks: StarPlus exclusively aired English programming, with Zee TV being its Hindi-language counterpart. However, on facing severe losses and very little market growth, Star violated the terms of the contract by slowly incorporating more and more Hindi programming into its schedule. Zee took Star to court over violation of the non-competing clause and shortly after that Star's partnership with Zee was dissolved on 30 June 2000.

Consequently, Star TV split Star Plus' beam into two, in effect, providing two separate services for different regional audiences within Star TV's footprint. Star India took over the reins of the network in the Indian subcontinent and the Middle East, which enabled the channel to provide appropriate programming at accessible viewing time for audience across different regions of Asia. Subsequently, StarPlus was transformed into a Hindi-language general entertainment channel, with Star World becoming the network's English-language GEC.

Initially, the channel followed a scheduling format similar to American networks, with new episodes of shows being aired on a weekly basis, a few days after their US telecast. This was altered in early-2010 to shows being aired on a daily basis Weekdays (Monday-Friday), to consolidate the channel's core viewership and appeal to the population of India. Thereafter, programming was classified into weekdays, weekends and late night slots, with new shows being brought in on a monthly basis throughout the year.

The channel's high-definition feed was launched on 15 April 2011.

=== Close down ===
On 16 October 2021, Disney announced that it would close down Star World and Star World Premiere HD, following similar decisions taken worldwide to close down English general entertainment channels. This will leave its youth channel Disney International HD, which consists of live action Disney Channel programming the only English entertainment channel from the broadcaster. The shutdown was delayed several times and Star World resorted into showing Koffee with Karan most of the day in order to pass time till its shutdown, while Star World Premiere HD would air the show 24/7.

The channels were eventually closed on 15 March 2023.

== Programming ==
Star World primarily airs popular shows from the United States, United Kingdom and Australia.

Star also holds exclusive broadcast, as well as streaming rights to all of HBO's original programming in India.

=== Programming blocks ===
Star World Weekend Binge

On 25 April 2015, Star World launched its weekend special programming block known as the Star World Weekend Binge. The block's main features included the latest episodes critically acclaimed shows, airing throughout the day.

Star World Now Trending

On 21 September 2016, Star World introduced a new programming block called Star World Now Trending where the latest seasons of the most popular American shows were aired. Highlights included Empire, The Blacklist, How to Get Away with Murder, Entourage, Homeland, Prison Break, Awkward and Teen Wolf (2011 TV series).

Star World 10 Tickles

Star World introduced a weeknight one-hour comedy block called Star World 10 Tickles on 4 October 2016. Black-ish and New Girl were the first shows to be aired on this block. Later, the block was extended to weekends in November 2016 where the latest seasons of shows like 2 Broke Girls, Speechless, Modern Family and Son of Zorn were aired.

Shows That Are Gonna Explode (STAGE)

STAGE was launched in June 2019, to air underrated shows with potential on weeknights at 10 pm, within a fortnight of their US broadcast. The initial catalog of shows for this block included Warrior, True Detective, The Passage, Pose, Succession and Fosse/Verdon.
