= Virrudh =

- Written by: Kamlesh Pandey; Jitesh Patel; Garima Goyal
- Directed by: Santram Verma
- Starring: See below
- Opening theme: "Virrudh"
- Country of origin: India
- Original language: Hindi
- No. of seasons: 1
- No. of episodes: 165

Production
- Producer: Smriti Irani
- Production location: Mumbai
- Cinematography: Raju Halasagi
- Editors: Dhirendra Singh; Narem Majiaha
- Running time: 21 minutes
- Production companies: Ugraya Entertainment; Applause Entertainment

Original release
- Network: Sony Entertainment Television
- Release: 26 March 2007 – 17 January 2008

Virrudh (transl. Against) is a Hindi language Indian soap opera that premiered on Sony TV on 26 March 2007 and ended on 17 January 2008. The series is jointly produced by Smriti Irani's production house Ugraya Entertainment and Aditya Birla Group's media arm Applause Entertainment, and starrs Smriti Irani, Achint Kaur and Mihika Verma.

== Plot ==
Virrudh's story revolves around Vasudha who is torn between her father Dhirendra Raisinghania and her love Sushant. Dhirendra is a power hungry media baron who has political connections and is passionate about his newspaper business entitled "Dainik Darpan". Vasudha blindly trusts her father's innocent make believe identity and is unaware of his dark past. Astound by his daughters' loyalty, Dhirendra decides to get her to lead his business in the future but is in constant fear that his secret bearers will reveal his evildoings to her, hence devastating his future plans. His secret bearers include some of his own family members, Sushant (Vasudha's fiancée and the chief crime reporter of Dainik Darpan) and his mother, and his political associate Sinha.

== Cast ==
- Vikram Gokhale as Dhirendra Raisinghania
- Sushant Singh as Sushant Sharma (Vasudha's Husband)
- Smriti Irani as Vasudha Raisinghania / Vasudha Sushant Sharma
- Achint Kaur as Vedika Raisinghania
- Karan Veer Mehra as Vedant Raisinghania
- Mihika Verma as Shreya Raisinghania / Shreya Siddharth Chopra
- Ashwini Kalsekar as Devyani
- Govind Namdev as Mr. Sinha
- Zarina Wahab as Shalini (Vasudha's Mother)
- Mohan Bhandari as Virendra Raisinghania (Dhirendra's Younger Brother)
- Anand Suryavanshi as Dhairya Raisinghania (Virendra's Younger Son)
- Chetan Hansraj as Rudraksh Raisinghania (Virendra's Elder Son)
- Apara Mehta as Uttara Sharma (Sushant's Mother)
- Anup Soni as Vikram
- Niyati Joshi as Aarti
- Pariva Pranati as Sandhya Vedant Raisinghania
- Aashka Goradia as Naina Siddharth Chopra
- Usha Nadkarni as Nani
- Bharti Achrekar as Bua
- Aanjjan Srivastav as Pandey Ji
- Sanjeet Bedi as Siddharth Chopra

== Awards ==
=== The Indian Television Academy (ITA) Awards, 2007 ===
- Best Actress in a Supporting Role - Achint Kaur
- Best Director (Drama) - Santram Verma
- Best Dialogues - Kamlesh Pandey

=== Indian Telly Awards, 2007 ===
- Best Actress (Critics' Choice) - Smriti Irani
- Best Ensemble Cast - Virrudh
- Best Dialogues - Kamlesh Pandey
