= List of Wicked Tuna: Outer Banks episodes =

Wicked Tuna: Outer Banks is a reality television series about commercial tuna fishermen based in the Outer Banks off the coast of North Carolina who battle each other to see who can get the most profit from catching Atlantic bluefin tuna. This series is a spinoff of the reality TV show Wicked Tuna which is based on Gloucester, Massachusetts. The series has aired on National Geographic Channel since August 17, 2014. As of November 21, 2021, 102 episodes of Wicked Tuna: Outer Banks have aired, concluding the eighth season.

== Series overview ==
Season	Episodes	Originally released	
Season	Episodes	First released	Last released
1	10	August 17, 2014	October 19, 2014
2	10	July 19, 2015	September 20, 2015
3	10	July 25, 2016	September 26, 2016
4	8	July 30, 2017	September 17, 2017
5	13	July 1, 2018	September 24, 2018
6	16	June 23, 2019	October 6, 2019
7	17	June 28, 2020	October 18, 2020
8	18	July 18, 2021	November 21, 2021

== Episodes ==
=== Season 1 (2014) ===
No. overall	No. in season	Title	Original release date
1	1	"Yankee Invasion"	August 17, 2014
After a disappointing North Atlantic bluefin tuna season, Captain Dave Marciano of the Hard Merchandise and Captain TJ Ott of the Hot Tuna travel south full steam into the waters of the Outer Banks, N.C., to extend their season and salvage their losses. In the South, the competition is fiercer and the stakes are higher than ever before. The 500-mile steam is a huge gamble on what could be a massive payday ' or a huge financial loss.
2	2	"Southern Discomfort"	August 24, 2014
The Southern captains fear a full-scale Yankee invasion of their waters when another Northern boat ' the Pin Wheel with Captain Tyler McLaughlin ' comes steaming into the Outer Banks. This trip, McLaughlin is desperate to make up for the embarrassing last-place finish he landed last season, and to help him he adds Paul Hebert onboard as co-captain. As the Pin Wheel steams in, they're greeted with gunshots by the Southerners, showing there is no room for Southern hospitality.
3	3	"Bluefin or Bust"	August 31, 2014
With six of the finest tuna fisherman traversing the Outer Banks in the hunt for bluefin, competition gets super competitive. The strict bluefin quota is rapidly starting to fill, and time is of the essence for all the captains. Dave Marciano has been unable to land a single catch and fears the huge gamble he made in traveling south will not pay off. If he doesn't catch a fish in the next two days, he won't be able to afford to stay in the Carolinas and will have to head back to Gloucester.
4	4	"We're Not in Gloucester Anymore"	September 7, 2014
Weather in the Outer Banks takes a turn for the worse, pitting man against sea as the turbulent Atlantic Ocean threatens the fishermen's quest for bluefin tuna. With ominous weather looming and the bluefin quota quickly filling, the pressure is on for the Northern and Southern boats to act fast or risk financial ' or nautical ' disaster. The Fishin' Frenzy leads the fleet and Captain Greg Mayer uses his knowledge of the Carolina waters to head out early before the windy weather escalates.
5	5	"Ice Ice Tuna"	September 14, 2014
Winter releases its fury on the Northern and Southern boats as a dangerous storm makes its way through the Outer Banks, giving the fishermen their toughest battle yet, facing high winds, snow and boat-crushing ice. The strain gets heavier for each fisherman as the ongoing hazardous weather obstructs their hunt for bluefin tuna. Southern captains Greg Mayer of the Fishin' Frenzy and Reed Meredith of the Wahoo continue to fight it out for top spot in the fleet.
6	6	"By Hook or By Crook"	September 21, 2014
Local rivals Fishin' Frenzy and Wahoo strive to out-fish one another and become the top-earning boat of the fleet. Meanwhile, Southern captain Britton Shackelford and his first mate Caine are struggling to make ends meet with only one catch so far. Northern captains TJ Ott of Hot Tuna, Dave Marciano of Hard Merchandise and Tyler McLaughlin of Pin Wheel all look to haul in as much of the remaining quota as they can to justify their 550-mile trip down from Gloucester.
7	7	"From Rods to Riches"	September 28, 2014
The Meredith brothers continue to reign on the Wahoo, but trouble with their hydraulic lines might put their lead in jeopardy. McLaughlin and Hebert of Pin Wheel have shot up to second place. Fishin' Frenzy's luck takes a turn for the worse when it wastes an entire afternoon reeling in the wrong kind of fish. Hard Merchandise has had a hot streak of big catches, but engine trouble threatens to put an end to its success. Doghouse continues to struggle, trailing the other boats by a wide margin.
8	8	"Doghouse Afternoon"	October 5, 2014
To make ends meet, Captain Britton Shackelford on Doghouse takes charter clients out for the day. For rivals Fishin' Frenzy and Wahoo, Fishin' Frenzy's captain Greg Mayer is back on top. With the end of the season only days away, both are desperate to stay ahead of the Meredith brothers. For Dave Marciano onboard the Hard Merchandise, the stress of catching bluefin has begun to take a toll on his health. The rivalry between Tyler McLaughlin on Pin Wheel and TJ Ott on Hot Tuna heats up.
9	9	"Tick Tock Tuna"	October 12, 2014
Pin Wheel and rivals Fishin' Frenzy and Wahoo lead the race with seven tuna each. Captain Greg Mayer of Fishin' Frenzy is desperate for catches to reclaim their top spot, while the Wahoo brothers Reed and Banks Meredith are determined to stay in the top spot. Pin Wheel Co-Captains Tyler McLaughlin and Paul Hebert are a stone's throw away from beating all of the Southern boats in their own backyard. Doghouse, Hard Merchandise and Hot Tuna struggle to haul in fish for the remainder of the season.
10	10	"The Fat Tuna Sings"	October 19, 2014
Wahoo leads the fleet, but local rival Fishin' Frenzy and invader Pin Wheel are serious threats for the top spot. Hard Merchandise needs one more bluefin to make the expensive trip south profitable, while Doghouse and Hot Tuna fight to earn one final paycheck to salvage their seasons. When captain Greg Mayer of Fishin' Frenzy receives the official call that the quota will close the next day at midnight, everyone races to catch more bluefin and reach the buyers in time to make the final sale.

=== Season 2 (2015) ===
No. overall	No. in season	Title	Original release date
11	1	"First Strike"	July 19, 2015
It's opening day of the Outer Banks bluefin season, and the captains battle it out to make the season's first catch. Captain Charlie “Grif” Griffin may be new to the competition, but he's a legend in these waters. Grif fishes alongside his son and, despite the competition, he forms a friendship with Gloucester captain Dave Marciano of the Hard Merchandise. Grif offers to help Marciano navigate the treacherous currents that run through Oregon Inlet as boats pass under Bonner Bridge. It's a dangerous gamble — if they make it through they'll reach the fishing grounds, but one wrong move could end both their seasons.
12	2	"Bombs Away"	July 26, 2015
After colliding with Bonner Bridge, Captain Marciano and Captain Griffin struggle to regroup. The boats are banged up, but it's too early to tell whether they can salvage their seasons or if they'll have to hang up their rods. Meanwhile, Captain Tami Gray of the Reel Action enters the competition. The Reel Action is one of the few all-female commercial fishing boats on the East Coast, but Tami knows that the only way to get respect is to earn it — by putting meat on deck. And over on the Pinwheel, Captain Tyler McLaughlin encounters a mysterious explosion at sea — a hazard that could jeopardize his fishing trip and cost him a paycheck.
13	3	"Fins of the Father"	August 2, 2015
Captain Charlie Griffin, of Reels of Fortune, might be leading the fleet in the bluefin earning, but his boat has been having problems since his crash into Oregon Inlet's treacherous Bonner Bridge. When Charlie picks up his boat after mechanics have finished working on the damage, it comes with a $10,000 bill, so now he and his hard-working son Jake must catch that much in fish just to break even. After two back-to-back seasons of being runner-up in New England and North Carolina, confident and cocky young Captain Tyler McLaughlin, of northern boat Pin Wheel, is determined to finish out the season as the No. 1 boat, and will let nothing get in his way — even the fishing lines of other boats.
14	4	"Salty Gals and Southern Nights"	August 9, 2015
At the start of day nine, last season's champion, Captain Greg Mayer, and his Fishin' Frenzy crew are the top earners in the Outer Banks' bluefin tuna fleet. Charlie and Jake Griffin, of the father-and-son operation Reels of Fortune, with a $10,000 boat repair bill still hanging over their heads, are more desperate than ever for a payday. Captain TJ Ott, of the northern boat Hot Tuna, is looking for any advantage he can get to turn his mediocre season around, so he reaches out to southern captain Tami Gray, of the all-female team Reel Action, hoping that a new friendship will lead to a wealth of local knowledge. And on Doghouse, captain Britton Shackelford's chances of landing his second keeper tuna of the season will all come down to whether his greenhorn son Austin can come through in a dangerous situation.
15	5	"Wicked Ride"	August 16, 2015
At the start of the 11th day on the water in North Carolina, treacherous winter weather in the Outer Banks fishing grounds forces captains to push their limits. Southern boat Reels of Fortune holds a meager lead over last year's local champion Fishin' Frenzy, while northern boat Hard Merchandise and local all-female team Reel Action have yet to catch a fish.
16	6	"Reels of Misfortune"	August 23, 2015
In North Carolina's bluefin tuna fleet, family is at the forefront of the fight to fish hard and make money. On Fishin' Frenzy, First Mate Nick Gowitzka faces a family emergency unfolding on land that tests his resolve on the water. And Captain Dave Marciano of Hard Merchandise draws on the support of his wife and daughter far away in Gloucester, Massachusetts, as well as a local family fishing operation to help him get through his slump.
17	7	"Nine-Foot Monster"	August 30, 2015
In this episode of Wicked Tuna: Outer Banks, seven crews face the Outer Banks hoping to reel in a fish big enough to keep. But with the luck they have had, prospects are not looking so good. The Fishin' Frenzy crew lucks out with a big catch and cashes in. With barely a bite, the Doghouse is forced to head in and trust that another day at sea will bring them a big catch. The Hot Tuna crew hopes that their dry spell will end and, with the final reel, they catch one of their largest tuna yet, cashing in over $9,000 for it.
18	8	"Burn Blubber"	September 6, 2015
With the North Carolina season coming to a close and Reels of Fortune battling Fishin' Frenzy for the top spot, all of the crews desperately struggle to land a fish and secure a paycheck. The Reel Action crew fights to catch up but takes a serious blow when they snag a shark; Tyler and Paul lose a “monstah” paycheck; and Dave and the crew of Hard Merchandise attempt to finally end their dry spell, or they'll have to cut the season short and head back to Gloucester.
19	9	"On a Fin and a Prayer"	September 13, 2015
With just five days left before the close of the season, the fleet is feeling the pressure. An accident leaves the Reel Action stuck at the dock, giving Captain Tami and her crew a late start, and tensions onboard reach a boiling point. Meanwhile, the Doghouse and Fishin' Frenzy have the top spot in sight and are scrambling to keep catching before time runs out. And Captain Griff on the Reels of Fortune finds himself in a dangerous situation while navigating Oregon Inlet — a battle where experience and quick thinking are all that stand between life and death.
20	10	"Wicked End"	September 20, 2015
It's the final two days of the season, and three Southern boats — the Fishin' Frenzy, the Reels of Fortune and the Doghouse — are all within striking distance of the top spot. As the clock ticks down, the captains are desperate to put meat on deck. The stakes have never been higher: one pulled hook means disaster, but one last catch can mean going home a champion.

=== Season 3 (2016) ===
No. overall	No. in season	Title	Original release date
21	1	"Back in the Battle"	July 25, 2016
It's bluefin tuna season in the Outer Banks. The fleet is excited to haul in these lucrative giants again — but new obstacles lie ahead.
22	2	"Wicked Waters"	August 1, 2016
As the bluefin season takes off, the treacherous waters of the Outer Banks claim another victim, and the Fishin' Frenzy and Hot Tuna are first on the scene.
23	3	"A Bluefin for Boo"	August 8, 2016
The unpredictable waters cause more problems for boats in the Outer Banks. The captains feel the pressure as the season starts to slip away from them.
24	4	"Underdog Day Afternoon"	August 15, 2016
With the fishing migration in an unpredictable state, the captains resort to espionage for information but end up with more than they bargained for.
25	5	"Not How We Operate"	August 22, 2016
The fifth week of the fishing season becomes a battle for the best fishing spots. The waters turn turbulent as boats go head-to-head to prove their superiority. When old and new rivals clash on the high seas, the pressure is on to land a fish first using strength and intellect. As the pressure mounts on Gloucester's bluefin tuna fishermen, captains will do whatever it takes to land a paycheck in their successful fishing spots.
26	6	"The Karma Kid"	August 29, 2016
As the boats are now past the halfway point in the season, the pressure is on to catch enough bluefin tuna to become the No. 1 boat in the fleet.
27	7	"Old Sailors and Bold Sailors"	September 5, 2016
Winter kicks into high gear in the Outer Banks and the captains must choose between safety at shore and risking it all at sea to catch bluefin tuna.
28	8	"Hostile Waters"	September 12, 2016
The Outer Banks bites back as treacherous waters force captains to choose between chasing the fish at great risk, or waiting until conditions improve.
29	9	"Striking Distance"	September 19, 2016
Tyler stuns the fleet with his comeback. The captleet with his comeback. The captains struggle to bring in a catch. The boats must stay out overnight to turn their luck around.
30	10	"Luck Be A Tuna Tonight"	September 26, 2016
In the season finale, each captain is desperate to bring in one last catch, and the top-earning boat is revealed.

=== Season 4 (2017) ===
No. overall	No. in season	Title	Original release date
31	1	"Fighting Frenzy"	July 30, 2017
Last season's champion, Captain Greg Mayer, is determined to land the season's first fish, but he must contend with a new adversary — his former mate.
32	2	"Full Throttle"	August 6, 2017
Captain TJ Ott is haunted by a terrifying accident at sea, and the Doghouse desperately tries to land its first fish of the season.
33	3	"Karma's a Fish"	August 13, 2017
Captain Greg Mayer sees his lead start to slip away as the competition heats up and one captain brings in the first triple catch of the season.
34	4	"Dethroned"	August 20, 2017
The pressure of losing the top spot wears on Captain Greg Mayer. And Captain Tyler McLaughlin has an unorthodox strategy for turning his luck around.
35	5	"I'll Sleep When I'm Dead"	August 27, 2017
The crews of the Doghouse, Foolish Pleasures and Little Shell all jockey to improve their positions before midseason burnout brings them down.
36	6	"Tuna and the Beast"	September 3, 2017
With two weeks left in the season, every captain in the fleet is feeling the pressure to bring in a bluefin and land a paycheck.
37	7	"Catch Me If You Can"	September 10, 2017
The captains push each other to the limit as they scramble to be on top. One fish can make the difference, but only one captain can claim first place.
38	8	"Title Fight"	September 17, 2017
As time runs out, the captains fight to bring in their last catches. Greg Mayer has won the last three seasons. Can another captain defeat him?

=== Season 5 (2018) ===
No. overall	No. in season	Title	Original release date
39	1	"Battle Lines"	July 2, 2018
It's opening day of the bluefin season, and a reduced quota puts pressure on the captains.
40	2	"Not in Our Backyard"	July 9, 2018
The southern fleet has the edge in the Outer Banks for bluefin season.
41	3	"Reverse the Curse"	July 16, 2018
A giant school of bluefin tuna breaks the curse for one of the boats, but a few other boats land only bad luck.
42	4	"Zombie Tuna"	July 23, 2018
The captain and crew of the Little Shell fight to land a fish and bring home a paycheck.
43	5	"Man Overboard"	July 30, 2018
Local Fleets fight the North for their fair share as sustainability strictly limits fishing.
44	6	"Redemption"	August 6, 2018
Northern and Southern boats battle for the top-earning title, while one boat's bad luck has it desperate to catch the first fish of the season.
45	7	"No Pain, No Gain"	August 13, 2018
A Southern captain leads the charge against the top-earning Northern boat with the biggest fish of the season, but big fish bring big problems.
46	8	"Man Down"	August 20, 2018
When a shoulder injury takes out top Captain Greg Mayer of the Fishin' Frenzy, the rest of the fleet sees an opportunity to take the lead.
47	9	"Northern Fury"	August 27, 2018
After four uninspired seasons in the Outer Banks, Captain TJ Ott has something to prove, while the Fishin' Frenzy fights for the title without a captain.
48	10	"Old Golly Whopper"	September 3, 2018
Captain Greg Mayer returns to the helm of the Fishing Frenzy, despite battling a painful shoulder injury.
49	11	"Blood, Sweat, and Tears"	September 10, 2018
With a limited number of days left to fish, Captain Tyler McLaughlin chooses between big risk and big reward.
50	12	"High Speed Chase"	September 17, 2018
Captain Greg Mayer of the Fishin' Frenzy is barely holding onto his lead, and the other captains are determined to knock him out of the top spot.
51	13	"Down To The Wire"	September 24, 2018
There are just 48 hours left before the season ends, and the battle to be the top-earning boat in the Outer Banks heats up.

=== Season 6 (2019) ===
No. overall	No. in season	Title	Original release date
52	1	"New Blood"	June 23, 2019
New Southern captains take on the Northern fleet on the first day of bluefin season in the Outer Banks.
53	2	"Bugging Out"	June 30, 2019
A Southern crew is stranded on the water with no bluefin.
54	3	"Little Boat, Big Tuna"	July 7, 2019
Southern boat Rasta Rocket sets out to prove that the little boat can be big competition.
55	4	"Hard Knocks"	July 14, 2019
Boats in the fleet must rely on local knowledge.
56	5	"Blood Feud"	July 21, 2019
Brothers from the South challenge a brother-sister duo from the North for the top spot.
57	6	"Reel Outlaws"	July 28, 2019
With the quota nearly gone, captains push limits to catch what might be final paychecks.
58	7	"Southern Aggression"	August 4, 2019
The bluefin quota is extended, and the captains look to capitalize on the opportunity; Capt. Earl is convinced that a few more weeks will help him prove that he truly belongs; a lucky streak may catapult the Hot Tuna to the top of the leaderboard.
59	8	"Thunder Tuna"	August 11, 2019
Extreme weather hits the Outer Banks; the Southern captains, accustomed to the dangerous conditions, believe they have a competitive edge, but the Northern captains are willing to do what it takes to put meat on deck.
60	9	"The Fast and Furious"	August 18, 2019
A game-changing fish pits Capt. Zack Shackleford and his young crew on the Rasta Rocket against the fleet's veterans; Northern boat Falcon embraces a new technique to try to stay in the game, and the Reel E' Bugging kicks it into overdrive.
61	10	"No Backing Down"	August 25, 2019
The Southern fleet fights to keep the lead, but the Northern boats aren't going down easy; when one fish is all it takes to shake things up, the only way to get on top is by taking risks and never backing down.
62	11	"Miracle Fish"	September 2, 2019
One fish could make all the difference; a little bit of luck goes a long way.
63	12	"The Home Run"	September 8, 2019
With the quota extended and the season stretching longer, the fleet is feeling homesick.
64	13	"Storm Troopers"	September 15, 2019
The pressure of a dwindling quota is starting to affect the captains, who realize the season could come to a sudden end; as a storm looms, the decision to stay out on the water could be detrimental to the boats battling it out for the top position.
65	14	"Breaking Point"	September 22, 2019
The captains are feeling the pressure; even the smallest mistake can torpedo a captain's chance of taking the top spot; Capt. Reed Meredith becomes desperate when mechanical failures threaten to derail his season.
66	15	"All Out War"	September 29, 2019
A quota extension creates an all-out frenzy as the captains scramble to land a few more fish before the season ends; Capt. Reed Meredith knows he has what it takes to lead the fleet; northern boats try to keep pace with the southern fleet.
67	16	"Battle for the Banks"	October 6, 2019
The Northern and Southern boats fight for the title in the final two days of the season.

=== Season 7 (2020) ===
No. overall	No. in season	Title	Original release date
68	1	"Clash of the Titans"	June 28, 2020
All-star captains go head-to-head when bluefin season opens in the Outer Banks.
69	2	"Stick 'Em"	July 5, 2020
One captain sees continued success on a green stick, frustrating the rest of the fleet.
70	3	"Family Pride"	July 12, 2020
The Pinwheel duo work to prove their worth and gain respect throughout the fleet.
71	4	"Pay to Play"	July 19, 2020
Financial strain hits the fleet as the tuna, and the captains' paychecks, prove elusive.
72	5	"Fishing Up a Storm"	July 26, 2020
Severe storms land in the Outer Banks, and one captain is hit especially hard by harsh weather conditions.
73	6	"A Fish For Frenzy"	August 3, 2020
Former winner Fishin' Frenzy struggles to keep up against the toughest teams.
74	7	"Never Seen Anything Like It"	August 9, 2020
Bait boils and the bluefin bite, but a devastating loss could change a champion forever.
75	8	"Tricky Dave"	August 16, 2020
Capt. Dave Carraro's "Tricky Dave" persona emerges.
76	9	"Hard Times at Sea"	August 24, 2020
Hard times on the water leave two former champions struggling to stay in the competition.
77	10	"Make Your Own Luck"	August 31, 2020
The captains must decide if skill or luck will help them win as the quota fills up.
78	11	"Graveyard Shift"	September 6, 2020
When the Oregon Inlet's notorious sand bar is near impassable, captains must decide to face it or turn around.
79	12	"Follow The Herd"	September 13, 2020
In order to have a profitable season, every boat must be willing to chase the bite.
80	13	"Together We Stand"	September 20, 2020
As the tuna titans continue to battle for top position, their mates attempt to keep up the pace.
81	14	"Reel Tension"	September 28, 2020
As the season grinds on, the fishermen are desperate to catch and tempers flare.
82	15	"Break Out or Break Down"	October 4, 2020
The end of the season is in sight, but the competition has taken a toll on the OBX fleet.
83	16	"No Time To Lose"	October 12, 2020
The captains fight to catch more bluefin with less than a week left in the season.
84	17	"Titan Showdown"	October 19, 2020
As the season comes to a close, the captains make a final push to take home the OBX title.

=== Season 8 (2021) ===
No. overall	No. in season	Title	Original release date
85	1	"Danger Lurks"	July 18, 2021
This Southern fleet of bluefin fisherman face one of their most dangerous seasons ever.
86	2	"Beat the Storm"	July 25, 2021
The Southern boats battle an angry ocean and short weather windows to find scattered fish.
87	3	"Hot Water, Big Tuna"	August 1, 2021
The fleet struggles as warm water brings a wave of big tunas through the Outer Banks.
88	4	"Doghouse Domination"	August 8, 2021
Britton on the Doghouse proves he may have the ace crew in the Outer Banks.
89	5	"Herd Is the Word"	August 15, 2021
The herds have arrived and the fleet jumps into action to try and get their share.
90	6	"Cost to Be the Boss"	August 22, 2021
A short weather window puts pressure on the fleet to catch more Bluefin before the storm.
91	7	"Fog of War"	September 5, 2021
Intense weather keeps most of the boats tied up, but one captain goes AWOL to score big.
92	8	"Hog Tied"	September 12, 2021
Hog Wild has struggled to make its mark all season - halfway through the competition, it's now or never if the new boat wants to stay in the game.
93	9	"Triple Trouble"	September 19, 2021
The captains help each other catch blue gold at the halfway point of blue fin season.
94	10	"Risky Business"	September 26, 2021
The wind wreaks havoc on the Outer Banks, but with over half the quota caught, the fleet takes bigger risks than ever.
95	11	"Pressure Point"	October 3, 2021
With another storm moving in, the race is tight and the pressure is high.
96	12	"Tried and True"	October 10, 2021
Unusual calm weather shakes up the competition, forcing captains to rethink their tactics.
97	13	"Goldrush"	October 17, 2021
Good weather brings a crowd to the fishing grounds, causing chaos while the bite is hot.
98	14	"Down to the Dollar"	October 24, 2021
With the competition tighter than ever, it's all about quality over quantity.
99	15	"The Big One"	October 31, 2021
Time is the enemy as big fish eat up the quota and paychecks hang in the balance.
100	16	"Red Seas"	November 7, 2021
The fleet looks to prevent the Fishin' Frenzy from securing its fifth title.
101	17	"Break Point"	November 14, 2021
The fishing season could end at any moment and tensions are at an all-time high.
102	18	"One Last Fish"	November 21, 2021
On the last day, the fleet battles the bar and each other in search of the winning fish.
