= Wicked Tuna: Outer Banks =

- Genre: Reality Television
- Country of origin: United States
- No. of seasons: 8
- No. of episodes: 102 (list of episodes)

Production
- Executive producer: Craig Piligian
- Running time: 60 minutes
- Production company: Pilgrim Studios

Original release
- Network: National Geographic Channel
- Release: August 17, 2014 – November 21, 2021

Related
- Wicked Tuna

Wicked Tuna: Outer Banks (previously known as Wicked Tuna: North vs. South) is an American reality television series about commercial tuna fishermen based in the Outer Banks who fish for the lucrative Atlantic bluefin tuna off the coast of North Carolina. The teams of fishermen battle each other to see who can catch the most fish, while trying to earn their livelihood.

In addition to offering an inside look at one of America's oldest industries, Wicked Tuna: Outer Banks also sheds light on important issues surrounding the fate of the bluefin tuna. Captains adhere to U.S. regulations that determine size limits and quotas for the season.

Wicked Tuna: Outer Banks is a spin-off of Wicked Tuna. Several vessels from the original show also appear in this version. Originally called Wicked Tuna: North vs. South, the name of the show was changed at the beginning of the second season. Season 6 began airing on June 23 and ended on October 6, 2019. The series was renewed for a seventh season on May 21, 2020.

== Vessels ==
=== Current ===
Name	Captain	Seasons
Fishin’ Frenzy	Greg Mayer	Seasons 1–5, 7- present
Pinwheel	Tyler McLaughlin	Seasons 1–7, 9- present
Hot Tuna	TJ Ott	Seasons 1–7, 9- present
Little Shell	Nick Gowitzka	Seasons 4–5, 7- present
Reel E' Bugging	Bobby Earl	Season 6- present
FV-Tuna.com	Dave Carraro	Seasons 7, 9- present

=== Former ===
Name	Captain	Seasons
Hard Merchandise	Dave Marciano	Seasons 1–3
Wahoo	Reed Meredith	Season 1
Doghouse	Britton Shackelford	Seasons 1–5, 8
Reel Action	Tami Gray	Season 2
Reels of Fortune	Charlie "Griff" Griffin	Seasons 2–5
Foolish Pleasures	Dale Lisi	Seasons 3–5
Falcon	Dave Marciano	Seasons 5–6
Kahuna	Reed Meredith	Season 6
Offshore Outlaw	Adam Price	Seasons 6,8
Rasta Rocket	Zack Shackleton	Seasons 6–8
Hog Wild	Jimmie Horning	Season 8

== Episodes ==
Season	Episodes	Originally released	
Season	Episodes	First released	Last released
1	10	August 17, 2014	October 19, 2014
2	10	July 19, 2015	September 20, 2015
3	10	July 25, 2016	September 26, 2016
4	8	July 30, 2017	September 17, 2017
5	13	July 1, 2018	September 24, 2018
6	16	June 23, 2019	October 6, 2019
7	17	June 28, 2020	October 18, 2020
8	18	July 18, 2021	November 21, 2021

== Season winners ==
Season	Winner	Captain	Total	Fish Caught	Runner Up	Captain	Total	Fish Caught
Season 1 – 2014	Fishin’ Frenzy	Greg Mayer	$49,634	10	Pinwheel	Tyler McLaughlin	$47,917	9
Season 2 – 2015	Fishin’ Frenzy	Greg Mayer	$46,720	12	Reels of Fortune	Charlie "Griff" Griffin	$42,220	8
Season 3 – 2016	Fishin’ Frenzy	Greg Mayer	$42,217	10	Pinwheel	Tyler McLaughlin	$41,530	7
Season 4 – 2017	Reels of Fortune	Charlie "Griff" Griffin	$64,675	10	Pinwheel	Tyler McLaughlin	$64,045	10
Season 5 – 2018	Fishin' Frenzy	Greg Mayer	$73,417	14	Little Shell	Nick Gowitzka	$69,911	13
Season 6 – 2019	Reel E' Bugging	Bobby Earl	$104,290	15	Offshore Outlaw	Adam Price	$100,998	14
Season 7 – 2020	Pinwheel	Tyler McLaughlin	$93,713	16	Little Shell	Nick Gowitzka	$87,259	15
Season 8 – 2021	Hog Wild	Jimmie Horning	$57,152	13	Doghouse	Britton Shackelford	$56,606	13

== See also ==
- Wicked Tuna
- Deadliest Catch
- Lobster Wars
- Whale Wars
