= List of Wicked Tuna episodes =

Wicked Tuna is an American reality television series about commercial tuna fishermen based in Gloucester, Massachusetts who fish for the lucrative Atlantic bluefin tuna in the North Atlantic Ocean. The teams of fisherman battle each other to see who can get the most profit from catching tuna. The series has aired on National Geographic Channel since April 1, 2012. As of June 8, 2020, 130 episodes of Wicked Tuna have aired in over 9 seasons accompanied by 11 specials.

== Series overview ==
Season	Episodes	Originally released	
Season	Episodes	First released	Last released
1	10	April 1, 2012	June 3, 2012
2	16	January 13, 2013	May 12, 2013
3	16	February 16, 2014	June 8, 2014
4	17	February 15, 2015	June 7, 2015
5	15	February 1, 2016	May 16, 2016
6	12	March 12, 2017	June 4, 2017
7	17	March 11, 2018	June 24, 2018
8	15	March 10, 2019	June 16, 2019
9	17	March 1, 2020	June 7, 2020
10	20	February 21, 2021	July 11, 2021
11	20	February 27, 2022	July 10, 2022
12	20	February 26, 2023	June 25, 2023
Specials	11	February 9, 2014	TBA

== Episodes ==
=== Season 1 (2012) ===
No. overall	No. in season	Title	Original release date
1	1	"The Bite Is On"	April 1, 2012
The series premiere introduces four crews of commercial fishermen as they set sail in search of lucrative bluefin tuna in the waters off New England.
2	2	"Payback's a Fish"	April 8, 2012
After going bust on his last trip, Dave Marciano of Hard Merchandise reels in a $10,000 fish. Meanwhile, the Bounty Hunter crew purposely mislead the Tuna.com guys as payback for Dave's fictitious advice that cost them time and money.
3	3	"Weekend Warriors"	April 15, 2012
Tuna.com continues on its winning streak; the debts pile up for Bill and the Bounty Hunter as the fish remain scarce and alcoholism takes its toll.
4	4	"Size Matters"	April 22, 2012
An 1100-pound fish is reeled in by the crew of the Christina, prompting a competitive Dave to put Tuna.com into overdrive to catch up. Meanwhile, Marciano takes out a charter tour in an effort to pay off his accumulating debt.
5	5	"Greed, Ego & Jealousy"	April 29, 2012
After a series of near misses, Captain Ralph Wilkins of the Odysea finally tracks down some fish, but then a distress call from a boat with engine trouble forces him to make a tough decision.
6	6	"Man v. Storm"	May 6, 2012
As an intense storm batters the coast, Captain Dave Marciano and the crew of the Hard Merchandise head out to sea, risking their lives in hopes of hooking a giant bluefin.
7	7	"Mutiny at Sea"	May 13, 2012
Tensions erupt on Tuna.com when Capt. Dave and Paul get into a heated confrontation that prompts Paul to quit. On the Bounty Hunter, an unsuccessful year forces Capt. Bill's wife to return to a job on land, leaving him shorthanded.
8	8	"Grudge Match"	May 20, 2012
With only two weeks left until the end of the season, Paul Hebert, formerly of Tuna.com, joins the Bounty Hunter crew. On the Hard Merchandise, Jay Meunzner, the first mate, struggles to prove his worth.
9	9	"Pirate Problems"	May 27, 2012
A hard season takes its toll on the crew of the Odysea, leading Capt. Ralph to lash out at his first mate, Pirate. On the Bounty Hunter, first mate Paul struggles to prove his worth to his new captain.
10	10	"Good to the Last Bite"	June 3, 2012
With winter approaching, the fishermen reel in their final catches of the year in the Season 1 finale. On Tuna.com, Capt. Dave tries to land what may be the biggest fish of the year.

=== Season 2 (2013) ===
No. overall	No. in season	Title	Original release date
11	1	"Back in the Hunt"	January 13, 2013
The second season begins with Dave Carraro encountering an unwelcome visitor in his first fishing spot of the season. Meanwhile, a New Hampshire fisherman heads south to compete with Dave.
12	2	"Go Fish!"	January 20, 2013
Tyler takes a risk by going to Georges Bank. Elsewhere, Kevin enjoys harpooning.
13	3	"The Numbers War"	January 27, 2013
In the continued pursuit of tuna, Bill Monte has gone three weeks without any keeper fish; but, his attention soon turns to his rocky marriage. After refinancing his mortgage, he lands a 184 pound bluefin tuna worth $20 a pound.
14	4	"Fish Fight"	February 10, 2013
The Gloucester-Casco bay classic sportfishing tournament is calling their name, so all the captains & crews pay up to $800 to join the frenzy. Dave's boat gets caught in the anchor line of a recreational fisherman's seine net when all hell breaks out. Tempers flare and relationships are tested at the 23rd Bonaire International & Local Fishing Tournament.
15	5	"Shark Attack"	February 24, 2013
Dave Marciano tries to grab a thresher shark by the tail only to be swatted across the chest, revealing a decent-sized bruise inflicted by the shark . Captain Ralph gets audited by ICCAT and swamped by paperwork and eventually fined $10,000 but settles the fine for $1,500, missing three days of tuna action.
16	6	"Sweet Smell of Revenge"	March 3, 2013
The crew of the FV-Tuna.com relocate when amateur boats start creeping in on their territory; a weekend warrior runs over Kevin's anchor line; Tyler ventures out on his own after giving his crew the week off.
17	7	"Storm Warning"	March 10, 2013
The fishermen work during a major storm.
18	8	"Hell on the High Seas"	March 17, 2013
At the season's midpoint, the captains deal with the increasing pressure to bring home a paycheck.
19	9	"Meltdown"	March 24, 2013
The Tuna.com takes the lead in Week 9 of the fishing season. Meanwhile, the crew of the Bounty Hunter deal with tension; and Tyler reaches a breaking point with his shipmates.
20	10	"Captain Carnage"	March 31, 2013
Dave and Paul enter into an intense competition to see who can catch the most fish.
21	11	"All Hands on Deck"	April 7, 2013
Paul's newfound confidence is shaken by his inexperienced deckhand; Dave Carraro works with a new recruit; and Tyler learns to cooperate with his Pin Wheel crew.
22	12	"Uncharted Territory"	April 21, 2013
The last weeks of the season are a struggle as the bluefin tuna begin to migrate south.
23	13	"Twice Bitten"	April 28, 2013
The young crew of the Pin Wheel close in on the FV-Tuna.com's lead; Paul needs a win.
24	14	"Money on the Line"	May 5, 2013
Part 1 of 2. Capt. Dave Carraro begins the last week of the season well ahead of the Pin Wheel crew. Meanwhile, Capt. Tyler works to prove himself; Capt. Paul Hebert wants to reach his goal; and Capt. Marciano tries to recover from a rough season
25	15	"Endgame"	May 12, 2013
The second season ends with a storm brewing as the crews battle to finish on top.

=== Season 3 (2014) ===
No. overall	No. in season	Title	Original release date
26	1	"The Wicked Return"	February 16, 2014
A rivalry between Tyler and TJ heats up in the Season 3 opener.
27	2	"Checkmate"	February 23, 2014
Tyler has second thoughts about hiring his friends. Elsewhere, Bill attempts to catch tuna by using tactical maneuvers and harpooning.
28	3	"Into the Storm"	March 2, 2014
A storm threatens the fishing fleet, impairing harpooning operations and forcing one captain to switch boats.
29	4	"Operation T.U.N.A."	March 16, 2014
TJ is tracked by a competitor looking to get in on his action. Elsewhere, two captains decide to work together to increase their tuna intake.
30	5	"Bite Fight"	March 23, 2014
Tyler goes to his lucky spot in an attempt to win back his pride and to make some money, but there he finds his former captain TJ already fishing.
31	6	"Mission: Fishin!"	March 30, 2014
Hot Tuna has managed to stay on top of the competition so far. However with the bluefin tuna season heating up, his anxious competition try to contend.
32	7	"Bad Latitude"	April 7, 2014
Burdened by the responsibility of providing for their families, the captains grow desperate to catch.
33	8	"Battle Royale"	April 20, 2014
With time running out to catch the elusive North Atlantic Bluefin tuna, Tuna.Com has a narrow lead over Hot Tuna, putting pressure on the Lily to land a killer catch.
34	9	"Brotherly Shove"	April 27, 2014
Captains get creative as new techniques help boat crews bring in more tuna. Elsewhere, tensions rise between the Hebert brothers aboard the Miss Sambvca.
35	10	"Blue Grit"	May 4, 2014
Tyler McLaughlin has trouble paying his crew; a truce is made between the Hebert brothers; and Dave Marciano attempts another trip in order to make more money.
36	11	"Tuna Beta Kappa"	May 11, 2014
The crew of the FV-Tuna.com assist the Coast Guard in a rescue mission. Later, a joint venture takes a turn for the worse when slow fishing creates tension between two captains.
37	12	"Bad Blood"	May 18, 2014
Old rivalries ignite between captains with four weeks remaining in the fishing season. Later, Dave Marciano attempts a risky trip far offshore.
38	13	"Sharks and Recreation"	May 25, 2014
With only three weeks left in the current season, the captains struggle to maintain their position on the leaderboard.
39	14	"The Mighty Bite"	June 1, 2014
Captain Dave Carraro of FV-Tuna.com is determined to keep up his hot streak, but the recklessness of another boat causes him to reach his boiling point. Captain TJ Ott of The Hot Tuna took over second place last week, but Captain Dave Marciano of Hard Merchandise is determined to regain second position. After a rocky start to the season, Captain Paul Hebert of Miss Sambvca has been on a catching streak for the past four weeks, and has his eyes set on second place as well.
40	15	"The Reckoning"	June 8, 2014
With only one week left in the North Atlantic bluefin fishing season, the Gloucester fleet is set for a final showdown in a bid to catch the last monstah tuna of the year. FV-Tuna.com has a commanding lead, leaving Hard Merchandise, Miss Sambvca and The Hot Tuna to battle for second place. On Pin Wheel, captain Tyler McLaughlin is desperate for a final fish to salvage his season after his fall from Gloucester's top-earning fisherman last season to catching only three tuna in the past 14 weeks.

=== Season 4 (2015) ===
No. overall	No. in season	Title	Original release date
41	1	"First Blood"	February 15, 2015
It's opening day of the new bluefin season, and every captain in Gloucester is angling to bring in the first catch and send a powerful message to the rest of the fleet.
42	2	"Anchor Anger"	February 22, 2015
Now successfully out of his slump, Captain Tyler McLaughlin sets his sights on beating Captain Dave Carraro on the FV-Tuna.com. But he takes the rivalry too far by playing a mindless prank on the veteran captain, causing tensions to spill over onto the dock.
43	3	"Bluefin Beatdown"	March 1, 2015
Captain TJ Ott is eager to put more fish on the deck, but runs into trouble after the steering breaks in the middle of a catch, and only his brother's experience as a mechanic can bail them out in time. Captains Dave Carraro and Tyler McLaughlin are desperately trying to out-fish each other in this season's most intense rivalry.
44	4	"Harpoon Hellraising"	March 8, 2015
It's week four of the North Atlantic bluefin tuna season and Captain Paul Hebert fights for his first tuna of the season.
45	5	"Go Hard or Go Home"	March 15, 2015
It's week five of Gloucester's bluefin tuna fishing season, and when a sudden storm engulfs the fleet, each captain must decide if the risk of staying out on the water is worth the reward of catching more bluefin tuna.
46	6	"Bent Rods and Broken Hearts"	March 22, 2015
It's week six, and Pin Wheel has a narrow lead over last season's champion fishing vessel Tuna.com, while Hot Tuna, Hard Merchandise and Kelly Ann are lagging behind.
47	7	"The Maine Event"	April 5, 2015
It's week seven of the North Atlantic Bluefin tuna fishing season and the Gloucester captains must decide to make the long steam to where the fish are biting or take their chances fishing closer to shore.
48	8	"Battle at Midway"	April 12, 2015
It's week eight of the Atlantic bluefin tuna season, and as the season ticks past the halfway point, the Gloucester captains are determined to work harder than ever to put tuna on their decks and charge into the rest of the season as strong as possible. But being on the water for the past two months is taking a toll on crew members and one mate faces a dilemma — keep fishing or quit so he can spend more time with his wife and kids.
49	9	"Wicked Pissed"	April 19, 2015
It's week nine of the North Atlantic bluefin tuna season, and Captain Paul Hebert of the troubled Kelly Ann struggles to prove his worth to his crew — and keep his job — after catching only three tuna in the first two months of fishing.
50	10	"When Push Comes to Shove"	April 26, 2015
It's the beginning of week 10 of the North Atlantic bluefin tuna season in Gloucester, Massachusetts. With only six weeks of fishing left, the competition is heating up, driving captains to push themselves and their crews to the brink.
51	11	"Three's a Charm"	May 3, 2015
It's week 11 of the North Atlantic bluefin tuna season, and bad luck, bait problems and big egos plague the Gloucester fleet.
52	v12	"Triple Crossed"	May 10, 2015
It's week 12 of the North Atlantic bluefin tuna season and, after catching no fish last week, last season's champion Captain Dave Carraro, of FV-Tuna.com, has sought help from his ally, Captain TJ Ott, of Hot Tuna.
53	13	"Tuna Trifecta"	May 17, 2015
It's week nine of the North Atlantic bluefin tuna season, and Captain Paul Hebert of the troubled Kelly Ann struggles to prove his worth to his crew — and keep his job — after catching only three tuna in the first two months of fishing.
54	14	"Knock Out Punch"	May 24, 2015
It's week 14 of the bluefin tuna season and with less than two weeks of fishing left, the top four crews are locked in a tight race to be Gloucester's best bluefin boat.
55	15	"It All Comes Down To This"	May 31, 2015
Captain Dave Marciano of the Hard Merchandise is desperately trying to maintain his precarious lead, but several run-ins with sharks and a fleet of fierce competitors are shaking things up. While the majority of the fleet opts to fish inshore, Captain Tyler McLaughlin of the Pinwheel decides to take a gamble and fish farther offshore — it's a huge risk, but a successful trip could put him on top of the fleet.
56	16	"Too Close To Call"	June 1, 2015
There are less than five days left before the Atlantic bluefin tuna season in Gloucester, Massachusetts closes and the competition will come down to the very last day of fishing. Captain Dave Marciano of Hard Merchandise has one tuna on ice and holds a narrow lead of over Captain Dave Carraro of FV-Tuna.com.
57	17	"Bait and Switch"	June 7, 2015
It's the final week of the season and Hard Merchandise holds a narrow lead over the fleet with fifteen fish. Hard Merchandise's closest rivals FV–Tuna.com, Pin Wheel, and Hot Tuna are all within striking distance of the lead and when a single tuna can be worth upwards of $20,000 the battle for the top spot will go down to the final day.

=== Season 5 (2016) ===
No. overall	No. in season	Title	Original release date
58	1	"Something to Prove"	February 16, 2016
A new fishing season begins, and everyone is angling to bring in the first catch.
59	2	"Tuna and Tequila"	February 8, 2016
Captain Paul Hebert triumphantly helms his own boat, the Wicked Pissah. TJ Ott and Dave Carraro bury the hatchet after a disagreement last season.
60	3	"May The Fish Be With You"	February 15, 2016
Captain Carraro's alliance with Captain Ott is put to the test. Captain Speeches heads to Maine. Things start to pick up for Captain Marciano.
61	4	"Pissed Off On Pissah"	February 22, 2016
FV-Tuna.com catches up to last season's champion, Hard Merchandise. Tensions amongst the crewmen on the Wicked Pissah reach a boiling point.
62	5	"Big Hauls and Downfalls"	March 7, 2016
Marciano finds himself in front of Dave. On the Wicked Pissah, turmoil between Paul and his crew threatens to end it for all of them.
63	6	"Help Wanted"	March 14, 2016
After his mates call it quits, Paul is forced to accept a helping hand from Dave, a person who is supposed to be his competition.
64	7	"Snitches Get Fishes"	March 21, 2016
Paul's team tries again. Pete notices that Erin is not pulling her weight. Dave and Tyler argue, ending in someone breaking a golden rule in fishing.
65	8	"Opposite Distract"	March 28, 2016
At just past the halfway mark of the North Atlantic Bluefin tuna season some teams are working well together and killing it while others are floundering and on the verge of killing each other.
66	9	"Take it to the Bank"	April 4, 2016
The Gloucester fleet captains all face a familiar decision: whether to take the long, high-risk journey to Georges Bank to increase their chances of a big bluefin haul - or possibly come home empty-handed.
67	10	"Doubling Down"	April 11, 2016
After a massive haul offshore on Georges Bank last week, Captain Dave Carraro of FV-Tuna.com and Captain TJ Ott of Hot Tuna decide to double down and make the long trip again in hopes of another massive payday.
68	11	"Riders in the Storm"	April 18, 2016
When a violent storm rolls in, the Gloucester captains face a tough decision at a critical time: Do they fish or flee?
69	12	"Comeback Kid"	April 25, 2016
Last season's champion Hard Merchandise has a precarious lead over persistent rival FV-Tuna.com., while Hot Tuna and Pinwheel battle forces beyond their control just to make a profit on the season.
70	13	"Tuna Invaders"	May 2, 2016
With only three weeks left, the North Atlantic captains face more competition than ever as boats from all over head to Gloucester and battle for those last bluefin of the season. The bite is hot inshore, forcing captains into a turf war with the competition - and each other.
71	14	"The Thin Bluefin Line"	May 9, 2016
There is a narrow margin separating the top four boats and only two weeks left in the season.
72	15	"The Final Fishdown"	May 16, 2016
In the last week of the Atlantic bluefin tuna season, the closest race in Wicked Tuna history is a tossup among four top contenders. It will all come down to the final catch! With high-value bluefin paying off at up to $16,000, the captains are all one fish away from victory or defeat.

=== Season 6 (2017) ===
No. overall	No. in season	Title	Original release date
73	1	"The First Fish is the Hardest"	March 12, 2017
Old rivals and a new competitor race to land the first fish of the season, which brings big money for one lucky captain.
74	2	"Trials & Tunalations"	March 19, 2017
The pressure is on for Captain Paul Hebert to land his first tuna. As the captains choose sides, Paul vows to prove his critics wrong.
75	3	"Bluefin Brotherhood"	March 26, 2017
A good deed by Captain Tyler McLaughlin earns him some positive karma. Captain Dave Carraro, frustrated with his dry spell, resorts to shady tactics.
76	4	"Who Needs a Captain?"	April 2, 2017
After a month of fishing, the mates of the fleet prove their worth, and one boat makes a historic haul that could change the outcome of the season.
77	5	"The Ego Has Landed"	April 9, 2017
After his mates succeed without him, Captain Dave Carraro is desperate to redeem himself in the eyes of the fleet, his crew and himself.
78	6	"Doldrums and Dog Days"	April 16, 2017
It's the midpoint of the season, and Captain Tyler McLaughlin is determined to stay out as long as necessary in order to best his rival, Dave Carraro.
79	7	"Captain Money Bags"	April 23, 2017
The battle for first place rages on, as two captains separate themselves from the pack while the rest of the fleet struggles to land a paycheck.
80	8	"Hickory Dickory Docked"	May 7, 2017
When Captain Dave Carraro opts to dock his boat for a few days, the other captains pounce on the chance to take the lead away from him.
81	9	"Hissy Fit"	May 14, 2017
Nick “Duffy” Fudge makes a mistake that could destroy the Pinwheel's chances of catching a fish, causing tempers to flare and tensions to boil over.
82	10	"Purple Rain"	May 21, 2017
A treacherous storm descends on Gloucester, forcing captains to choose between risking their lives battling the elements or missing out on a catch.
83	11	"The End Is Nigh"	May 28, 2017
With two weeks left, Captains Dave Carraro and Tyler McLaughlin are locked in a battle for first place, and each is determined to come out on top.
84	12	"The Time Is Now"	June 4, 2017
Captain Tyler McLaughlin is within striking distance of becoming this year's champion, but will a sudden setback at sea derail his chances?

=== Season 7 (2018) ===
No. overall	No. in season	Title	Original release date
85	1	"Worst to First"	March 11, 2018
It's opening day of the bluefin tuna season, and the first fish can bring big money. With a payday at stake, every captain is fighting to land a tuna.
86	2	"Fish or Famine"	March 18, 2018
As defending champ Captain Dave "Big Tuna" Carraro (FV-Tuna.com) struggles to land a fish, the rest of the fleet seizes the opportunity to get ahead.
87	3	"Merch Madness"	March 25, 2018
The Hard Merchandise is the only boat that has yet to land a fish, and Captain Dave Marciano is feeling the pressure.
88	4	"Don't Quit Your Day Job"	April 1, 2018
When inexperienced fishermen crowd the water, the fleet has to fight through additional obstacles in order to earn a paycheck.
89	5	"Smoke on the Water"	April 8, 2018
The captains team up to double their chances of catching fish, but forming an alliance with a competitor proves to be risky.
90	6	"Two for the Money"	April 15, 2018
The alliance between Captains Dave Marciano and Dave Carraro is in jeopardy after the Hard Merchandise suffers a breakdown at sea.
91	7	"The Fleet Strikes Back"	April 22, 2018
Defending champion Captain Dave Carraro and his crew of the FV-Tuna.com take the lead for the first time this season.
92	8	"Ride the Lightning"	April 29, 2018
As a massive storm front slams the fishing grounds, the fleet takes big risks to catch the elusive bluefin.
93	9	"Fishin' Friction"	May 6, 2018
The weeks of fishing take their toll on the fleet. Paul, feeling frustrated after a disappointing week, takes his anger out on Rick.
94	10	"Mutiny on the Water"	May 13, 2018
Paul's negative attitude sours his relationship with his mate, Rick. And Tyler is forced to fish solo after his mate doesn't show up for work.
95	11	"Road to Redemption"	May 20, 2018
Captain Brad Krasowski of the Fish Hawk is on a hot streak and is ready to make good on his promise to go from “worst to first".
96	12	"Point Break"	May 27, 2018
After weeks of bad luck and few fish, Capt. Dave Marciano reaches his breaking point.
97	13	"Fin and a Prayer"	June 3, 2018
Capt. Dave Marciano tries to turn his bad luck around and salvage his season.
98	14	"Shock and Awe"	June 10, 2018
Brad Krasowski is one big catch away from completing his "worst to first" comeback.
99	15	"Changing the Tide"	June 17, 2018
The fleet competes for final paychecks, and the two top boats are forced off the water.
100	16	"Fight to the Finish"	June 24, 2018
With fewer than four days left in the season, the fleet races to claim the title of top-earning boat; two captains are sidelined, and it is anyone's game.

=== Season 8 (2019) ===
No. overall	No. in season	Title	Original release date
101	1	"Battle Cry"	March 10, 2019
It's opening day of the bluefin tuna season; after a mediocre performance in the Outer Banks, Capt. Dave Marciano is ready for his first season aboard his new boat, the Falcon; Capt. Tyler McLaughlin copes with the unexpected loss of his mate.
102	2	"Game of Fins"	March 17, 2019
It is the second week of the bluefin tuna season; a familiar boat enters the fleet, igniting old rivalries; Pinwheel's crew members continue to mourn for Nick; the Wicked Pissah crew struggles to maintain its lead.
103	3	"Wreck It Ralph"	March 24, 2019
An old acquaintance is back in Gloucester, Mass., to fight for the title as the best fisherman, but the fleet makes him feel unwelcome; for one fisherman, the sea is not big enough for both of them.
104	4	"Gods and Monstahs"	March 31, 2019
Bad luck strikes the fleet, and the captains struggle to turn their fortunes around.
105	5	"Relative Madness"	April 7, 2019
Capts. Dave Marciano and TJ Ott struggle near the bottom of the leader board; Capt. Dave Marciano's nephew, Jay, brings a shot of energy to the Falcon; Capt. Tyler McLaughlin strives to pull ahead; all three captains turn to family members for help.
106	6	"Attack of the Pack"	April 14, 2019
The captains are challenged when a large group of boats shows up for the weekend and Hot Tuna must decide whether to risk leaving a familiar spot.
107	7	"Double Team"	April 21, 2019
It's almost the midpoint of bluefin fishing season, so the clock is ticking; new alliances are built and battles continue in the race for a payday.
108	8	"Wicked Waves"	April 28, 2019
Stormy weather hits, and one captain brings in a payday that shakes up the leader board.
109	9	"One for the Money"	May 5, 2019
With so many fish being caught, the quota will soon change from three to one a day; captains and their crews are pushed to their breaking points; for some, this is the last chance to get ahead, while, for others, it could mean the end of the line.
110	10	"Blood in the Water"	May 12, 2019
It's a game changer going into week 10 of bluefin season when the quota drops from three fish to one fish per day, making the pressure mount.
111	11	"Thick as Thieves"	May 19, 2019
Capt. Tyler McLaughlin feels the pressure to stay ahead of Capt. Dave Carraro, but a new boat of friendly faces joins the fleet; mechanical troubles plague the Falcon.
112	12	"The Sherman Tank"	May 26, 2019
The captain must decide whether to risk making their way further out to sea 170 miles away from Gloucester, Mass., where the fish promise to be big.
113	13	"Coming for the Crown"	June 2, 2019
Capt. Dave Carraro commands the top-earning boat on the leader board, but nothing will stop the rest of the captains from pushing against all odds to take down the king.
114	14	"Pulling Out All the Stops"	June 9, 2019
With the untimely death of Pinwheel first mate Nicholas "Duffy" Fudge, defending champion Capt. Tyler McLaughlin questions whether he will be able to defend his title.
115	15	"The Final Tail"	June 16, 2019
Pinwheel and Dot Com battle for the top prize but dark horse Hot Tuna upsets their equilibrium and turns this competition into a three-way contest.

=== Season 9 (2020) ===
No. overall	No. in season	Title	Original release date
116	1	"The Enemy Among Us"	March 1, 2020
It's the first day of a new bluefin season, and the Gloucester captains unexpectedly meet their matches when a fleet of outsiders comes to town.
117	2	"War on the Water"	March 8, 2020
The Gloucester fleet defends their home turf when new boats work together to take over the competition.
118	3	"Band of Brothers"	March 15, 2020
Coming into bluefin season, three new boats sit at the top of the fleet, proof they are worthy adversaries to the original Gloucester Captains.
119	4	"Follow the Leaders"	March 22, 2020
With the quota disappearing, the veteran fleet must fend off the outsiders, as the new boats attempt to get on their fishing spots, and into their heads.
120	5	"Blood Lines"	March 29, 2020
As the competition between the OGs and the tourists heats up, Gloucester captains rely on family ties.
121	6	"Kraken the Code"	April 5, 2020
A dry spell is broken; both fleets test new locations to try to dominate the leaderboard.
122	7	"While the Getting is Good"	April 12, 2020
The captains are on edge as a flooded market threatens to shut down the fishery.
123	8	"Bluefin Shutdown"	April 19, 2020
The bluefin market shuts down in 48 hours, and tensions among the captains run high.
124	9	"Back to Business"	April 26, 2020
The bluefin market reopens, but as prices hit a new low, the fleet scrambles to recover.
125	10	"Mate Debate"	May 3, 2020
With the markets reopened, the mates step up to help out and prove their worth.
126	11	"Angry Waters"	May 10, 2020
Extreme weather and high seas force the captains to decide between fight or flight.
127	12	"Pineapple Mafia"	May 17, 2020
As the competition heats up, the captains will try anything to appease the tuna gods.
128	13	"Crunch Time"	May 24, 2020
As the bluefin quota diminishes, one captain lands the biggest fish of the season.
129	14	"Brawlin for Bluefin"	May 31, 2020
The battle between captains Tyler McLaughlin and Sam Law turns into an all-out war.
130	15	"All Out of Tomorrows"	June 7, 2020
The fleet battles extreme weather, monster bluefin and uncertain profits as the captains fight to land their last catches — and the No. 1 spot.

=== Specials ===
No.	Title	Original release date
1	"Head to Tail"	February 9, 2014
Take a look back at the best moments from the first two seasons of Wicked Tuna, featuring the fishermen of Gloucester, Mass. battling for supremacy as they pursue the elusive Atlantic Bluefin Tuna. These are the wildest catches and the biggest showdowns between rivals, setting the stage for an all-new third season that will see them clashing harder than ever.
2	"Reel Talk Live"	June 8, 2014
Following the heart-pounding Wicked Tuna season three finale, Reel Talk Live brings fan-favorite captains and crewmen to join host Mike Salk before a live audience to answer fan questions, reveal behind-the-scenes scoop and look ahead to the future of the successful Wicked Tuna franchise.
3	"Masters of Bluefin"	February 8, 2015
Take a look back at the best and worst moments from the previous seasons of Wicked Tuna and Wicked Tuna: North vs. South, as the top fishermen of Gloucester, Massachusetts, battle for supremacy while they pursue the ocean's top prize. And get an exclusive sneak peek at the action-packed new season of Wicked Tuna.
4	"Reel Talk Live 2015"	May 31, 2015
Fan-favorite captains and crewmen join a live audience to answer fan questions, reveal behind-the-scenes scoop and look ahead to the future of the successful Wicked Tuna franchise. Wicked Tuna has built a fiercely loyal fan base over its four seasons on the air, and Reel Talk Live adds an exciting and interactive way to let those fans share the finale with their favorite cast members.
5	"The Return"	January 31, 2016
A look back at each captains' best and worst moments during the past four seasons, and an exclusive peek at the new and explosive season of Wicked Tuna.
6	"Reel Talk Live 2016"	May 16, 2016
After the high-octane Wicked Tuna season five finale, the cast and host “Psycho Mike” Catherwood recap the season's highs and lows.
7	"Join the Crew"	March 5, 2017
See the making of Wicked Tuna and explore each captain's history over the past five seasons, including epic battles and meltdowns.
8	"Hard Merchandise"	January 4, 2018
The never-before-told story is told about a Gloucester bluefin fisherman; Captain Dave Marciano of the Hard Merchandise; and his family crew.
9	"Tuna Tantrums"	March 12, 2018
A behind-the-scenes look at the top 20 epic fights, blowups and tantrums within the Gloucester fleet. Whether it's battling their mates, their fellow captains, or even themselves, the stakes for tuna fishing have never been more explosive.
10	"Pinwheel Wizard"	March 25, 2018
This special will showcase the highs and lows of Captain Tyler's career, with new interviews providing a previously unseen view from his perspective.
11	"Hot Tuna"	June 4, 2018
A look is taken at the Hot Tuna's crew, and their time spent in Gloucester as they work towards their goal of catching the most rewarding tuna is shown, also, additional insights into the Ott family history is unexpectedly revealed.
