= Wicked Tuna =

- Genre: Reality television
- Country of origin: United States
- No. of seasons: 13
- No. of episodes: 170 (list of episodes)

Production
- Executive producers: Mike Nichols; Craig Piligian; Lynn Sadofsky; Michael Cascio
- Running time: 60 minutes
- Production company: Pilgrim Studios

Original release
- Network: National Geographic Channel
- Release: April 1, 2012 – May 26, 2024

Related
- Wicked Tuna: Outer Banks

Wicked Tuna is an American reality television series about commercial tuna fishermen based in Gloucester, Massachusetts, who fish for the lucrative Atlantic bluefin tuna in the North Atlantic Ocean. The teams of fishermen battle each other to see who can get the most profit out of catching the fish. The series originally aired on National Geographic Channel from April 1, 2012 to May 26, 2024.

In addition to offering an inside look at one of America’s oldest industries, Wicked Tuna sheds light on important issues surrounding the fate of the bluefin tuna. Captains adhere to U.S. regulations that determine size limits and quotas for the season.

Following season 8 of Wicked Tuna: Outer Banks, National Geographic retitled the 2022 Season as Season 1 of Wicked Tuna: Outer Banks Showdown.

In August 2024, it was announced that the series had been canceled after 13 seasons.

== Vessels ==
=== Final ===
Name (Boat length and make/model)	Captain	Seasons
FV-Tuna.com (44’ Calvin Beal)	Dave Carraro	Season 1 - 13
Hard Merchandise (39’ Daniels Head)	Dave Marciano	Seasons 1-7, 10 - 13
Pinwheel (55’ Dixon)	Tyler McLaughlin	Season 2 - 13
Hot Tuna (48’ Dixon)	TJ Ott	Season 3 - 13
Wicked Pissah (40’ Osmond Beal)	Paul Hebert	Season 5 - 13
Fat Tuna (46’ Mussel Ridge)	Bob Cook	Season 9 - 13
Time Flies (32’ Everglades)	Jack Patrican	Season 10 - 13
No Limits (33’ Blue Hill Marine)	Michelle Bancewicz	Season 12 - 13

=== Former ===
Name (Boat length and make/model)	Captain(s)	Seasons
Bounty Hunters (35’ Duffy)	Bill Monte	Seasons 1-4
Odysea (32’ Blue Hill Marine)	Ralph Wilkins	Seasons 1-3, 8
Christina (35’ Duffy)	Kevin Leonowert	Seasons 1-2
Lisa and Jake (40’ Young Brothers)	Paul Hebert	Season 2
Miss Sambvca (48’ Ocean Motor Yacht)	Paul Hebert	Season 3
Lily (36’ Morgan Bay)	Bill "Hollywood" Muniz	Seasons 3-5
Kelly Ann (35’ RP)	Paul Hebert	Season 4
Kristiana (35’ Morgan Bay)	Greg Chorbanian	Seasons 4-5
Erin & Sarah (45’ MDI)	Pete Speeches	Season 5
Fish Hawk (42’ Dana Hunter)	Brad Krasowski	Seasons 6-8
Whistler (35’ Donelle)	Kevin Granfield	Season 8
Falcon (43’ Torres)	Dave Marciano	Seasons 8-9
Kraken (44’ Willis Beal)	Sam Law	Season 9
Wasabi (35’ Bruno and Stillman)	Charlie Boivin and Zack Plante	Season 9
Moonshine (43’ Donelle SE)	Spurge Krasowski	Seasons 10-11
Badfish (45’ Dixon)	Tim Ott Sr.	Seasons 10-12

== Episodes ==
Thirteen complete seasons of Wicked Tuna have aired.

Season	Episodes	Originally released	
Season	Episodes	First released	Last released
1	10	April 1, 2012	June 3, 2012
2	16	January 13, 2013	May 12, 2013
3	16	February 16, 2014	June 8, 2014
4	17	February 15, 2015	June 7, 2015
5	15	February 1, 2016	May 16, 2016
6	12	March 12, 2017	June 4, 2017
7	17	March 11, 2018	June 24, 2018
8	15	March 10, 2019	June 16, 2019
9	17	March 1, 2020	June 7, 2020
10	20	February 21, 2021	July 11, 2021
11	20	February 27, 2022	July 10, 2022
12	20	February 26, 2023	June 25, 2023
Specials	11	February 9, 2014	TBA

== Wicked Tuna: Hooked Up ==
These are replays of the original 25 episodes but with extra trivia boxes which contain additional insights into the fishermen's thoughts, attitudes, and personalities. Wicked Tuna: Outer Banks also has a Hooked Up version called Wicked Tuna: Outer Banks or Bust.

== Season winners ==
Season	Winner	Captain	Total	Fish caught	Runner-up	Captain	Total	Fish caught
1 (2012)	FV-Tuna.com	Dave Carraro	$85,950	Unknown	Hard Merchandise	Dave Marciano	$61,000	Unknown
2 (2013)	Pinwheel	Tyler McLaughlin	$100,861	16	FV-Tuna.com	Dave Carraro	$96,978	14
3 (2014)	FV-Tuna.com	Dave Carraro	$126,403	15	Hard Merchandise	Dave Marciano	$61,904	8
4 (2015)	Hard Merchandise	Dave Marciano	$102,690	18	Pinwheel	Tyler McLaughlin	$99,876	16
5 (2016)	FV-Tuna.com	Dave Carraro	$104,785	22	Wicked Pissah	Paul Hebert	$104,611	19
6 (2017)	FV-Tuna.com	Dave Carraro	$98,580	18	Pinwheel	Tyler McLaughlin	$98,561	15
7 (2018)	Pinwheel	Tyler McLaughlin	$103,936	19	Fish Hawk	Brad Krasowski	$103,361	18
8 (2019)	FV-Tuna.com	Dave Carraro	$120,318	19	Pinwheel	Tyler McLaughlin	$119,741	18
9 (2020)	Hot Tuna	TJ Ott	$67,854	11	FV-Tuna.com	Dave Carraro	$63,152	10
10 (2021)	Wicked Pissah	Paul Hebert	$53,303	15	Hard Merchandise	Dave Marciano	$48,541	14
11 (2022)	Fat Tuna	Bob Cook	$84,030	16	Time Flies	Jack Patrican	$83,930	14
12 (2023)	Hot Tuna	TJ Ott	$70,148	13	Fat Tuna	Bob Cook	$69,930	12
13 (2024)	Fat Tuna	Bob Cook	$82,077	14	Wicked Pissah	Paul Hebert	$77,808	12

== Spin-off ==
After season 2 of Wicked Tuna, Nat Geo announced a spin-off of the show set off the coast of the Outer Banks in North Carolina. The spin-off was named Wicked Tuna: North vs. South. Several vessels from the original show also appear in this version. Following the first season, Wicked Tuna: North vs. South was renamed Wicked Tuna: Outer Banks for its second season.

== Broadcast schedule ==
The following table is a timeline overview of how both Wicked Tuna and Wicked Tuna: Outer Banks series have been released:

Series	Season	Episodes	First aired	Last aired
Wicked Tuna	Season 1	10	April 1, 2012	June 3, 2012
Wicked Tuna	Season 2	15	January 13, 2013	May 12, 2013
Wicked Tuna	Season 3	15	February 16, 2014	June 8, 2014
Wicked Tuna: North vs South (Outer Banks)	Season 1	10	August 17, 2014	October 19, 2014
Wicked Tuna	Season 4	17	February 15, 2015	June 7, 2015
Wicked Tuna: Outer Banks	Season 2	10	July 19, 2015	September 20, 2015
Wicked Tuna	Season 5	15	February 1, 2016	May 16, 2016
Wicked Tuna: Outer Banks	Season 3	10	July 25, 2016	September 26, 2016
Wicked Tuna	Season 6	12	March 12, 2017	June 4, 2017
Wicked Tuna: Outer Banks	Season 4	8	July 30, 2017	September 17, 2017
Wicked Tuna	Season 7	16	March 11, 2018	June 24, 2018
Wicked Tuna: Outer Banks	Season 5	13	July 1, 2018	September 24, 2018
Wicked Tuna	Season 8	15	March 11, 2019	June 16, 2019
Wicked Tuna: Outer Banks	Season 6	16	June 23, 2019	October 6, 2019
Wicked Tuna	Season 9	15	March 1, 2020	June 8, 2020
Wicked Tuna: Outer Banks	Season 7	17	June 28, 2020	October 18, 2020
Wicked Tuna	Season 10	20	February 21, 2021	July 11, 2021
Wicked Tuna: Outer Banks	Season 8	18	July 18, 2021	November 21, 2021
Wicked Tuna	Season 11	20	February 27, 2022	July 10, 2022
Wicked Tuna: Outer Banks Showdown	Season 9	18	July 17, 2022	October 10, 2022
Wicked Tuna	Season 12	20	February 26, 2023	June 25, 2023

== See also ==
- Deadliest Catch
- Lobster Wars
- Swords: Life on the Line
- Whale Wars
