= Josh D'Amaro =

American business executive (born 1971)

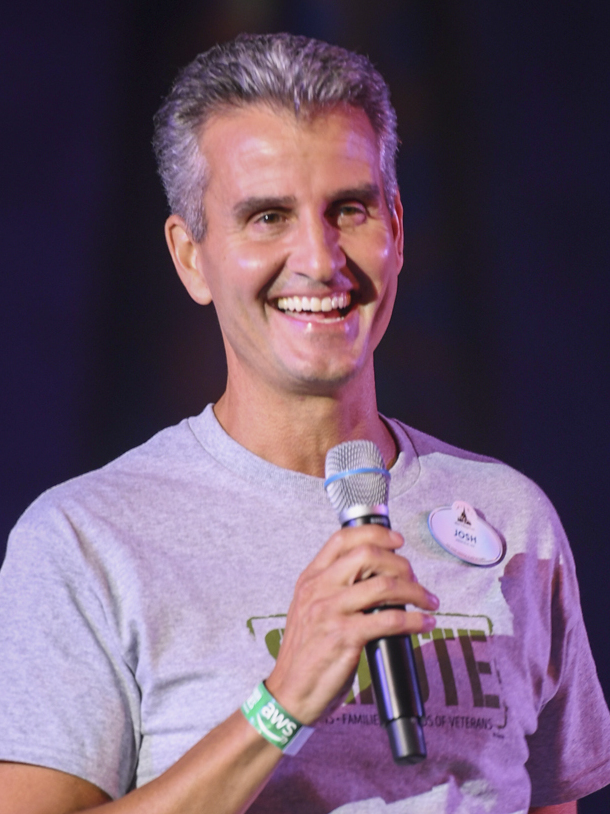
- D'Amaro in 2022
- Born: February 10, 1971 (age 55); Medfield, Massachusetts, U.S.
- Education: Georgetown University (BBA)
- Occupation: Business executive
- Years active: 1998–present
- Title: CEO of The Walt Disney Company (2026–present) Former positions: Disney Experiences Chairman (May 18, 2020 – March 18, 2026); President of Walt Disney World (November 2019 – May 18, 2020); President of Disneyland (February 2018 – November 2019)
- Term: March 18, 2026 – present
- Predecessor: Bob Iger
- Spouse: Susan D'Amaro
- Children: 2

Signature
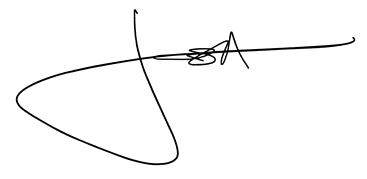

Josh D'Amaro (born February 10, 1971) is an American business executive who has been the chief executive officer of the Walt Disney Company since 2026, succeeding Bob Iger. D'Amaro has been employed by the Walt Disney Company for 27 years. He previously served as chairman of Disney Experiences from 2020 to 2026, president of Walt Disney World from 2019 to 2020, and president of Disneyland from 2018 to 2019.

== Early life ==
D'Amaro was born on February 10, 1971, in Medfield, Massachusetts. He was educated at Medfield High School and initially studied sculpture at Skidmore College before transferring to Georgetown University. In 1993, D'Amaro graduated from Georgetown with a bachelor's degree in Business Administration. He began his career in the finance department of the Gillette Company based in Boston before joining the Walt Disney Company in 1998.

== Career ==
For the first 10 years of his career at Disney, D'Amaro held various leadership positions. From 1998 to 2008 he was vice president of sales and travel trade marketing. During that time he was also director of business planning and strategy development from 2005 to 2006. In 2008, he became chief financial officer of Disney Consumer Products Licensing business and held the position for two years.

=== Positions within Disney Parks, experiences, and products ===
In 2010, he was promoted to vice president of Adventures by Disney based in Celebration, Florida. This position meant he oversaw all group guided tour operations to various U.S. and international destinations.

From 2013 to 2014, D'Amaro was vice president of Disney's Animal Kingdom. Ultimately, D'Amaro was vice president as the theme park planned its major expansion to include Pandora – The World of Avatar, the joint venture between Disney and James Cameron and the largest expansion in its history. After the expansion of Disney's Animal Kingdom began construction, in September 2014, D'Amaro became senior vice president of Resort & Transportation Operations at the Walt Disney World Resort in Florida, working in this position until February 2017.

From 2017 to 2020, D'Amaro's positions within Parks, Experiences and Products changed quickly. In 2017, he was promoted to CCO of the Walt Disney World Resort, a higher position that he held for a year before taking on the role of president of Disneyland Park in Anaheim, California, another role he held for a year and a half, before returning to Florida to become president of Walt Disney World Resort.

In 2020, Bob Chapek succeeded Bob Iger as CEO of the Walt Disney Company. On May 18, 2020, D'Amaro succeeded Chapek as chairman of Disney Experiences during the COVID-19 pandemic. The chairmanship means D'Amaro would be responsible for the management of attractions, cruise ships, merchandise and retail of all six theme parks in California, Florida, France, Shanghai, Hong Kong and Tokyo.

On September 29, 2020, during the COVID-19 pandemic, Disney cut 28,000 employees from its theme parks. Despite the phased reopening of many Disney resorts around the world during the summer of 2020, Disneyland Resort in California was unable to reopen its theme parks and furloughed cast members and staff.

In April 2021, as COVID-19 restrictions were being lifted, D'Amaro had set about reopening certain Disney parks and services to the public. On April 30, 2021, Disney reopened Disneyland Park in Anaheim, which was the final Disney resort to reopen after the initial closure. Disneyland Paris reopened on June 17 (after the second closure on October 30, 2020), making it the final Disney park and resort to be reopened overall and one of three Disney resorts to close, reopen, and close again due to local government restrictions, the others being Hong Kong Disneyland and Shanghai Disneyland.

On February 3, 2026, Iger named D’Amaro his successor as CEO of The Walt Disney Company. He assumed the position at the company's annual meeting on March 18.

== Personal life ==
D'Amaro has two children with his wife Susan.

Business positions
Preceded by Bob Iger	CEO of the Walt Disney Company; 2026–	Succeeded by
