= Disney Platform Distribution =

Media unit of The Walt Disney Company

Disney Platform Distribution, Inc.
- Formerly: Capital Cities/ABC Video Enterprises, Inc. (1987–93); ABC Cable and International Broadcast Group, Inc. (1993–99); Disney–ABC International Television, Inc. (1999–2011); Disney Media Distribution, Inc. (2011–20)
- Type: Subsidiary
- Predecessor: Buena Vista International Television; 20th Television (original)
- Founded: January 27, 1987; 39 years ago
- Headquarters: Walt Disney Studios, Burbank, California, U.S.
- Area served: Worldwide
- Key people: Jimmy Zasowski (president)
- Services: Film distribution; Film promotion; Television syndication
- Parent: Capital Cities/ABC (1987–1999) Buena Vista International Television (1999–2007); Disney–ABC Television Group (2007–2018); Disney Media and Entertainment Distribution (2018–2023); Disney Entertainment and ESPN (2023–present)
- Website: dmdcentral.com

Disney Platform Distribution, Inc. is a business unit within Disney Entertainment that manages all third-party media sales efforts for distribution, affiliate marketing and affiliate-related business operations for all of the company's direct-to-consumer services and linear media networks; content sales agreements for Disney Entertainment and ESPN.

The company was originally established in 1987 under the Capital Cities/ABC Video Enterprises, Inc. name and later renamed ABC Cable and International Broadcast Group, Inc., Disney–ABC International Television, Inc. and Disney Media Distribution. On October 12, 2020, the company took its current name.

== Predecessors ==
=== Buena Vista International Television ===
Buena Vista International Television, Inc.
- Trade name: Buena Vista International Television, Inc.
- Type: Division
- Industry: Television syndication
- Founded: 1985; 41 years ago
- Defunct: May 14, 2007; 19 years ago
- Fate: Defunct, rebranded to Disney–ABC International Television
- Successor: Disney–ABC International Television
- Headquarters: Burbank, California, U.S.
- Area served: Worldwide
- Parent: Disney–ABC Television Group

Buena Vista International Television (BVIT) was the international television distribution arm of the original Walt Disney Television, and the international television arm of Buena Vista Television themselves. BVIT was established in 1985 to produce non-American series and distribute all Disney-owned libraries around the world.

In 1987, Buena Vista International Television had signed a three-year deal to provide five hours a week for Disney-related material, such as feature films, television movies and series. In 1988, at the MIPCOM, Buena Vista International Television said that they were planning on to develop up to five pay international cable channels on its own, none of them were materialized.

=== ABC Pictures International, Inc. ===
The company made its origins as early as 1978 when American Broadcasting Companies, Inc. formed ABC Pictures International to handle sales in the international television market. It was incorporated on January 3, 1978. Erwin H. Ezzes, former CEO of United Artists Television was signed on as a consultant to the company.

In 1979, ABC Pictures International has launched its instructional arm ABC Learning Resources, Inc., and Donna B. Sessa would run ABC Learning Resources, Inc. Later that year, it was merged into ABC Video Enterprises, Inc.

=== ABC Video Enterprises, Inc. ===
On July 2, 1979, ABC had formed ABC Video Enterprises, Inc. to develop and market programing domestically for cable, pay cable, videodisks, cassettes and other new communications forms, and it was headed up by Herbert A. Granath, who was vice president of the ABC television network. Later that year, ABC Pictures International was merged into the company.

== History ==
=== Capital Cities/ABC Video Enterprises ===
Capital Cities/ABC Video Enterprises (CAVE) was incorporated on January 27, 1987. as an ancillary production, video and distribution company owned by Capital Cities/ABC. In 1992, CAVE launched Capital Cities/ABC Video Publishing as its subsidiary to release videotapes under the ABC Video label. In December 1992, CAVE realigned its upper management by adding a president position to Capital Cities/ABC Video Productions for overseas control of its production units Ultra Entertainment, the Hemisphere Group and Capital Cities/ABC Video Productions and bringing in Archie C. Purvis to fill the position. Joseph Y. Abrams was promoted to replace Purvis as president of ABC Distribution Co. Both have reported to president of CAVE International, John T. Healy.

On July 25, 1993, CAVE and DIC Animation City formed a production joint venture called DIC Entertainment L.P., to provide material for CAVE to distribute in the international market.

=== ABC Cable and International Broadcast Group ===
In early October 1993, CAVE became part of the newly formed ABC Cable and International Broadcast Group (ACIBG), moving out of the broadcasting group to directly report to the CEO of CC/ABC, with Herb Granath continuing as president. The group continued oversighting its stakes in cable companies ESPN, A&E and Lifetime, international program sales, co-production and interests in foreign program services Eurosport, Germany's RTL-2, Japan Sport Network and animation company DIC. On October 12, Ambroco Media Group, Inc. was formed under Purvis to work with foreign partners for the development and production of programs. On October 21, Capital Cities/ABC Video Enterprises changed its legal name to Capital Cities/ABC Cable and International Broadcasting, Inc., then on December 15, it changed once again to ABC Cable and International Broadcast, Inc. In January 1994, ABC Network announced Purvis' retirement and the closure of Ambroco's operations.

=== Disney–ABC International Television ===
When the Disney-CC/ABC merger led Disney Television and Telecommunications to be split up in April 1996, Walt Disney Television International was transferred to Capital Cities/ABC. CC/ABC combined the international units, Walt Disney Television International and ACIBG, into Disney–ABC International Television (DAIT) in July 1996. On October 19, 1999, ABC Cable and International Broadcast Group was renamed Disney–ABC International Television, Inc. By February 1999, DAIT began operating under the Buena Vista International Television name.

On May 14, 2007, Buena Vista International Television was renamed Disney–ABC International Television, due to Disney semi-retiring the Buena Vista name. In April 2008, the Asia Pacific office renewed its multi-year movie agreement with Zee Studio, an Indian basic-cable movie channel. In October 2015, at Mipcom in Cannes, Disney Media Distribution France extended its film and TV agreement with Canal Plus Group, adding first-run rights to films including those from Lucasfilm and SVOD rights for CanalPlay, which is effective in January 2016.

With the March 14, 2018, strategic reorganization in anticipation of integrating 21st Century Fox's assets, Walt Disney Direct-to-Consumer & International was formed with distribution units being moved over from Disney-ABC Television Group. In July 2019, Marinelli announced her resignation, ending a 34-year long tenure with the company. Janice Marinelli, president of global content sales and distribution, would report to Mayer. Disney announced it would combine all the company's media sales and channel distribution into one organization. ESPN's executive vice president Justin Connolly was promoted to the newly created role of president of media distribution, reporting to Mayer. With a leadership change in this new segment in May 2020, the media distribution group was moved to Disney Media Networks. Then on August 10, 2020, Disney Media Distribution replaced 20th Television as a syndication and distribution arm.

=== Disney Platform Distribution, Inc. ===
On October 12, 2020, Disney CEO Bob Chapek announced a strategic reorganization that created a new division of the company, Media and Entertainment Distribution, that is being led by Kareem Daniel. Under the new structure, Disney created a group responsible for both the dissemination and ad sales for all of its content, including across streaming services including Disney+. Effectively, that makes Disney Platform Distribution responsible for Disney–ABC Domestic Television, Walt Disney Studios Home Entertainment, and Walt Disney Studios Motion Pictures.

In February 2023, the reinstated Disney CEO Bob Iger restructured the company, restoring theatrical distribution and Disney Music Group back to Walt Disney Studios chairman. The rest of Disney Platform Distribution would serve as a shared service for both Disney Entertainment and ESPN.

In May 2025, Justin Connolly, who reported to Disney chairmen Dana Walden, Alan Bergman, and Jimmy Pitaro, announced he would be stepping down as President of Disney Platform Distribution.

== Distribution library ==
=== Current ===
The company distributes movies from Disney units including:

- Walt Disney Pictures
  - Walt Disney Animation Studios
  - Pixar Animation Studios
- 20th Century Studios (formerly 20th Century Fox)
  - 20th Century Animation (formerly 20th Century Fox Animation)
- Searchlight Pictures (formerly Fox Searchlight Pictures)
- Marvel Studios
  - Marvel Studios Animation/Marvel Animation
  - Marvel Television
- Lucasfilm
  - Lucasfilm Animation
- Disneynature
- ESPN Films
- The Muppets Studio
- Star Studio18

The company distributes TV programs from other Disney units including:

- Disney Television Studios
  - 20th Television (second and current iteration; formerly 20th Century Fox Television)
  - 20th Television Animation (formerly Fox Television Animation)
- Searchlight Television
- ABC News, along with the Annual Academy Awards
- Disney–ABC Domestic Television
- Disney Kids & Family
  - Disney Channel
  - Disney XD (formerly Toon Disney/Jetix)
  - Disney Junior (formerly Playhouse Disney)
  - Disney Original Documentary
  - Disney Television Animation
  - It's a Laugh Productions
- Marvel Entertainment (except some TV productions)
- ESPN
- The Muppets Studio
- ABC Entertainment
- Freeform
- FX Networks
- National Geographic Global Networks
- Disney Streaming
  - Disney+
    - Star
  - Hulu

The company used to distribute movies and TV programs from former Disney units including:

- Touchstone Pictures
- Hollywood Pictures
- Caravan Pictures
- Cinergi Pictures
- Fox Atomic
- Fox Faith
- Fox 2000 Pictures
- Disneytoon Studios
- Blue Sky Studios
- Fox Animation Studios
- ABC Family Worldwide
  - Fox Kids/Fox Children's Productions
  - Jetix Animation Concepts
  - BVS Entertainment
    - SIP Animation
      - Créativité et Développement
    - New World Animation/Marvel Productions
    - Saban/Scherick Productions
    - Libra Pictures
  - TVS/MTM Enterprises
- Walt Disney Television (original iteration)
- 20th Television (first iteration and syndication company)
- ABC Signature (formerly ABC Studios, the original ABC Signature Studios, and the first iteration of Touchstone Television)
- Touchstone Television (second iteration; formerly Fox 21 Television Studios)
  - Fox Lab
  - Fox Television Studios
    - Fox World (formerly Fox Television Studios International)
  - Foxstar Productions
  - Fox 21
- Marvel Television (2010-2019; original iteration)
- 20th Digital Studio (formerly Zero Day Fox and Fox Digital Studio)
- Star+

=== Former ===
- Miramax Films (1993–2010)
  - Dimension Films (Pre-2005)
- DIC Entertainment (Post-1990 catalogue from 1996 to 2000 and pre-1989 catalogue from 2001 to 2006, including newer shows from the time. Except Inspector Gadget movies.)
- DreamWorks live-action (2011–2016), library to select international television audiences

=== Ultra Entertainment, Inc. ===
Ultra Entertainment was a TV production division of Capital Cities/ABC Video Enterprises for cable, network home video and foreign outlets. Ultra was expected to development and produce for cable channels Arts & Entertainment and Lifetime, both of which has a stake owned by CAVE, but also for other cable channels.

On May 8, 1989, the formation of Ultra Entertainment was announced CC/ABC Video Enterprises (CAVE) to produce programs for cable, home video and foreign markets. A staff of three employees was assembled to get the unit off the ground, with Bob Rubin as executive director. It first work was the telefilm Death Dream, produced for Lifetime with Dick Clark Film Group and Roni Weisberg Productions, which premiered on June 25, 1991.

Films distributed by Ultra Entertainment, Inc. include:

- Death Dream (June 25, 1991) for Lifetime with Dick Clark Film Group and Roni Weisberg Productions
- Elvis and the Colonel: The Untold Story (1993) NBC with Dick Clark Film Group
- Secret Sins of the Father
- Spenser: Ceremony movie (July 22, 1993) Lifetime with Norstar Entertainment and Broadwalk Entertainment
