= Disney Media =

Disney Media may refer to:

- Disney Media Networks, a former business segment of the Walt Disney Company
- Disney Media Distribution, now Disney Platform Distribution, a business segment of the Walt Disney Company
- Disney Media and Entertainment Distribution, a former business segment of the Walt Disney Company
