= Adam Smith (media executive) =

American businessman

- Occupation: Businessman
- Title: Chief Product & Technology Officer, Disney Entertainment and ESPN of the Walt Disney Company (2024–Present)
- Predecessor: Aaron LaBerge

Adam Smith is an American businessman who serves as the Chief Product & Technology Officer at the Walt Disney Company as of September 3, 2024.

== Early life ==
He received an MBA from the Stanford Graduate School of Business and a B.S. from the University of California at Berkeley.

== Career ==
Smith had been at Google and YouTube for more than 20 years, up until 2024 when he became the Chief Product & Technology Officer and The Walt Disney Company. At YouTube, Smith was Vice President of Product Management for YouTube and helped build its consumer-facing products, such as Music and Premium offerings, to over 100 million subscribers, along with leading Global Content and Product across kids, sports, news, and education. He also served as the regional head for Asia-Pacific. At Google, he led development and strategy for a series of products including Google Fiber, Google APAC, and other products that include Google Books, Google News, Google Finance and Google Scholar. Smith also previously held roles at Random House/Bertelsmann.

On September 3, 2024, Smith was named Chief Product & Technology Officer and The Walt Disney Company to succeed Aaron LaBerge. Smith's role oversees the company’s global Product and Technology group, which spans Disney’s entertainment and sports media businesses. Smith's responsibilities will include "setting the strategy, development and innovation of technology across Disney’s streaming platforms and networks, its advertising tech and 'consumer digital touchpoints'". Smith is said to report to Disney Entertainment co-chairmen Alan Bergman and Dana Walden and ESPN chairman Jimmy Pitaro.

In June 2025, Disney announced layoffs that affected Smith's organization, which amounted to under 2% of the group. The layoffs were motivated by rebalancing resources.

== Personal life ==
Adam lives in San Francisco with his wife and family.
