= Disney Media Networks =

Former media division of Disney

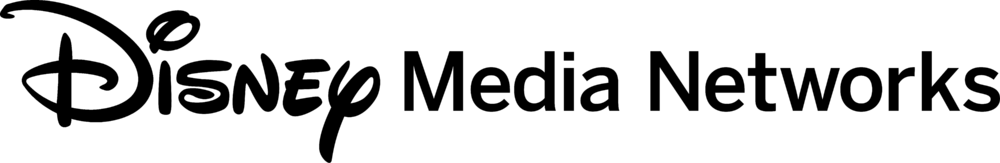
- Formerly: Walt Disney Telecommunications (1981–2004)
- Type: Division
- Industry: Entertainment, cable and satellite television
- Founded: November 9, 1981; 45 years ago
- Founders: James P. Jimirro; Alan Wagner
- Defunct: October 12, 2020; 6 years ago
- Fate: Assets split up
- Successors: Disney Media and Entertainment Distribution (other assets) ESPN and Sports Content (sport content)
- Headquarters: 91505 S Buena Vista St, Burbank, California, United States
- Key people: Peter Rice (co-chairman, WDTV President); Paul Buccieri (A&E Networks president & co-chairman)
- Brands: A&E; ACC Network; ABC; Disney Channel; Disney Junior; Disney XD; ESPN; FX; Freeform; History; Lifetime; Longhorn Network; Nat Geo Wild; National Geographic; SEC Network; Vice TV
- Parent: The Walt Disney Company
- Subsidiaries: Walt Disney Television; A&E Networks (50%)

Disney Media Networks was a business segment of the Walt Disney Company that oversaw the company's television networks, cable channels, television production and distribution studios, and owned-and-operated television stations. The segment's primary divisions were Walt Disney Television (first and second incarnations) and A&E Networks (50% stake).

== History ==
=== 1977–1983: Origins ===
In 1977, Walt Disney Productions executive Jim Jimirro brought forth an idea of a cable television network that would feature television and film material from the Walt Disney Studios. Since the company was focusing on the development of the Epcot Center at Walt Disney World, Disney chairman Card Walker turned down the proposal of the network. Instead, they made a deal with HBO to air a select number of Disney films, cartoons, and specials, including a live production of Snow White and the Seven Dwarfs at Radio City Music Hall. However, Disney revived the idea in November 1981 to create Disney Channel, entering into a joint venture with the unit of Group W (which had sold its 50% ownership stake in one of The Disney Channel's early rivals, Showtime, to Viacom around the same time); however, Group W would ultimately drop out of the intended partnership that September following disagreements over the channel's creative control and financial obligations that would have required Group W to pay a 50% share of the channel's start-up costs.

Despite losing Group W as a partner, The Disney Channel continued on with its development – now solely under the oversight of Walt Disney Productions, and under the leadership of the channel's first president Alan Wagner, Walt Disney Productions formally announced the launch of its family-friendly cable channel in 1983. Disney later invested United States dollar11 million to acquiring space on two transponders of the Hughes Communications satellite Galaxy 1, and spent US$20 million on purchasing and developing programming. The concept of a premium service aimed at a family audience – which Walt Disney Productions would choose to develop The Disney Channel as – had first been attempted by HBO, which launched Take 2 in 1979 (the service, which was HBO's first attempt at a spin-off niche service (predating Cinemax's launch in August 1980), would shut down after only a few months on the air), and was followed by the 1981 launch of the Group W-owned Home Theater Network (which was the only premium channel that strictly competed with The Disney Channel for that demographic for much of the 1980s, until the 1987 launch of Festival).

=== 1983–1995: The Disney Channel and expansion to Europe ===
Disney launched nationally The Disney Channel as a premium channel at 7:00 a.m. Eastern Time on April 18, 1983. The channel – which initially kept for a 16-hour-per-day programming schedule from 7:00 a.m. to 11:00 pm. Eastern and Pacific Time – would become available on cable providers in all 50 U.S. states by September 1983, and accrue a base of more than 611,000 subscribers by December of that year.

Disney reorganizing itself and creating two independent subsidiaries, Walt Disney Pictures for the movies and Walt Disney Television for the television. In 1983 Walt Disney Television was formed as the Walt Disney Pictures Television Division, the name was later shortened to Walt Disney Pictures Television in 1986 and later shortened to Walt Disney Television in 1988. Until 1983, Disney shows were aired under the banner of the parent company, then named Walt Disney Productions until 1986.

In 1980s to 1992 Walt Disney Television was launching numerous channels in Europe with the aim of relaunching the Disney brand before the opening of the Euro Disney resort in 1992 with Le Disney Channel being launched on January 26, 1985, on FR3.

=== 1996–2004: Acquisition of ABC ===
In 1996, Disney acquired Capital Cities/ABC Inc., and re-branded media conglomerate as Disney–ABC Television Group. The assets acquired at the time included ABC Television Network Group, CC/ABC Broadcasting Group (ABC Radio Network, eight television and 21 radio stations), ABC Cable and International Broadcast Group, CC/ABC Publishing Group and CC/ABC Multimedia Group to the fold. The Cable and International Broadcast Group contained ownership shares of ESPN, Inc. (80%), A&E Television Networks (37.5%), Lifetime Television (50%) and its international investments. These investments included Tele-München (50%, Germany; included 20% of RTL II), Hamster Productions. (33%, France) and Scandinavian Broadcasting System (23%, Luxembourg). ESPN also had international holdings: Eurosport (33.3%, England), TV Sport (10%, France; Eurosport affiliate) and The Japan Sports Channel (20%). The Publishing Group including Fairchild Publications, Chilton Publications, multiple newspapers from a dozen dailies (including the Ft. Worth Star-Telegram, The Kansas City Star) and more weeklies, and dozens more publications in the fields of farm, business and law trade journals plus LA Magazine to Institutional Investor. The Multimedia Group pursued businesses in new and emerging media technologies, including the interactive television, pay-per-view, VOD, HDTV, video cassette, Optical disc, on-line services and location-based entertainment.

In 1997, Disney/ABC Cable Networks teamed with one of the minority partners of the network with Comcast to buy the channel after Time-Warner had exercised their put agreement. Comcast increased the ownership stakes in the network through mergers with forerunners of TCI and Continental under various circumstances. In November 2006, Disney sold their 39.5% share of E! to Comcast for $1.23 billion to gain full ownership of the network as part of a broader programming carriage agreement between Disney/ABC and Comcast.

ABC Group chairman Robert A. Iger was named president and chief operating officer of The Walt Disney Company in January 2000. In 2000, with an investment by Bain Capital and Chase Capital Partners, Heyward re-purchased DIC Enterprises.

On April 30, 2000, following a dispute between Disney and Time Warner Cable forced WTVD off cable systems within the Raleigh–Durham–Fayetteville market for over 24 hours during the May sweeps period. Other ABC stations in markets served by Time Warner Cable, such as New York City, Los Angeles and Houston, were also affected by the outage as well before the FCC forced TWC to restore service to those areas on May 2. On October 24, 2001, Disney acquired Fox Family Worldwide for $2.9 billion cash with $2.3 billion in debt assumption, which gave Disney control of the Fox Family channel (which, owing to its new ownership, was renamed ABC Family, and its parent company renamed ABC Family Worldwide), the Saban Entertainment library, the Fox Kids networks in Latin America and Europe, as well as additional cable rights to Major League Baseball that were assigned to Fox Family via the Fox Sports division, which included a slate of Thursday-night regular season games, and Division Series games. In June 2000, Disney sold its 33% stake in Eurosport for $155 million to TF1.

In January 2004, Disney and Fox Kids Europe, Fox Kids Latin America launched a new joint brand for their children's television operations, Jetix, which would be used to brand programming blocks which aired on ABC Family and Toon Disney, its television channels in Europe and Latin America, along with its program library and merchandising.

=== 2004–2020: Disney Media Networks ===
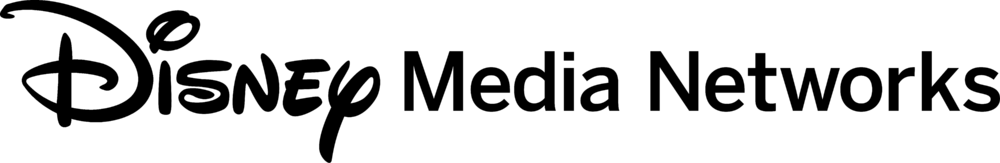
Disney Media Networks logo

On April 21, 2004, Disney announced a restructuring of the division with Anne Sweeney being named president of ABC parent Disney–ABC, and ESPN president George Bodenheimer becoming co-CEO of the division with Sweeney, as well as president of ABC Sports. This move added ABC TV Network within Disney-ABC. ABC1 channel initially launched in the United Kingdom on September 27, 2004 as the first use of the ABC brand outside the US. While ABC News Now was launched that year in the US on digital subchannel of 70 ABC owned & operated and affiliates.

In November 2006, Disney's 39.5% share of E! to Comcast for $1.23 billion to giving full ownership of the network as part of a broader programming carriage agreement between Disney and Comcast.

On June 12, 2007, Disney spun off its ABC Radio Networks and merged it into Citadel Communications with Citadel Broadcasting while retaining its ESPN Radio and Radio Disney networks and stations and a 10-year news provider licensing agreement with Citadel for ABC News Radio and the networks.

On December 8, 2008, Disney made an agreement to increase ownership in Jetix Europe to 96%, with intentions to purchase the remainder and have Jetix Europe delisted from the Euronext Amsterdam exchange.

On December 16, 2008, Disney established a joint venture in Russia with Media One to create a network of 30 channels. On February 20, 2009, the Russian anti-monopoly commission blocked Disney of acquiring 49% of the Russian group Media One and then Catalpa Investments a Russian subsidiary of Disney sought the approval of the commission for the acquisition of 49% of the new company MO-TV Holdings, which gave the opportunity to hold the Russian television group Media One, which made Disney to launch a Disney Channel in Russia.

On January 22, 2009, Disney–ABC said it would merge ABC Entertainment and ABC Studios into a new unit called ABC Entertainment Group. That April, ABC Enterprises took an ownership stake in Hulu in exchange for online distribution license and $25 million in the ABC network ad credits. The Live Well Network (LWN) was launched on April 27, 2009, by ABC Owned Television Stations on the stations' subchannels. Later that year, A+E Networks acquired Lifetime Entertainment Services with DATG ownership increasing to 42%. In November, Disney-ABC sells GMTV to ITV for $37 million.

In July 2012, NBCUniversal confirmed plans to sell its 15.8% stake in A+E Networks to Disney for $3 billion (along with its previous owner Hearst Entertainment & Syndication, who became 50-50 partners in the joint venture).

On August 21, 2013, Disney–ABC announced it will lay off 175 employees. The layoffs are expected to hit positions among technical operations as well as the unit's eight local stations.

In August 2014, A+E took a 10% stake in Vice Media for $250 million, then announced in April 2015 that H2 would be rebranded into the Vice channel with an indicated early 2016 launch. Disney also directly made two $200 investments in Vice Media in November 2015, then a week later in December, they directly invested in it again for 10% to assist in funding its programming. ABC Family became Freeform on January 12, 2016.

In September 2016, the group's president Ben Sherwood named Bruce Rosenblum, Television Academy chairman and former head of Warner Bros. TV Group, as president of business operations in s the newly created position, to reduce the number of direct reports from 17 to about 8. Roseblum would oversee ad sales in conjunction with channel heads, affiliate sales and marketing, engineering, digital media, global distribution, IT, research and strategy and business development. This allows Sherwood to focus on content and direct operating units that continue to directly report to him, ABC network units, cable channel units (Disney Channels Worldwide, and Freeform), ABC Studios and ABC TV Stations.

On October 8, 2018, Disney announced during its acquisition of 21st Century Fox assets that Peter Rice, then-CEO and president of Fox Networks Group, would serve as the chairman and president of the second incarnation of Walt Disney Television (now Disney General Entertainment Content). Rice would also replace Ben Sherwood, who is scheduled to leave his post as co-chair of Disney Media Networks. Fox TV Group chairman and CEO Dana Walden would be named chairman, Disney Television Studios and ABC Entertainment. Within Disney Television Studios and ABC Entertainment, Walden would oversee 20th Century Fox Television and ABC Studios, plus ABC, Freeform and ABC's owned-and-operated television stations. FX Networks and National Geographic Partners would transfer over as is and report to President of Walt Disney Television.

=== 2020 - Closure ===
In June 2020, FuboTV announced a deal with Disney Media Networks to add ESPN Inc., and Walt Disney Television (including ESPN and its networks and ABC, along with children's networks such as Disney Channel).

On October 12, 2020, the assets were restructured and transferred to Disney Media and Entertainment Distribution, Disney General Entertainment Content and ESPN and Sports Content (later known as simply ESPN Inc.), effectively dissolving Disney Media Networks. The name would however be referenced numerous times in news sources about Disney's future restructurings and reorganizations post-2020.

== Assets ==
TV channels

Category	Channels
Now overseen by Disney General Entertainment Content
ABC Entertainment Group	ABC News
ABC Entertainment Group	ABC Audio
ABC Entertainment Group	ABC News Radio
Freeform and FX Networks	Freeform
Freeform and FX Networks	FX
Freeform and FX Networks	FXX
Freeform and FX Networks	FX Movie Channel
Disney Branded Television	Disney Channel
Disney Branded Television	Disney Junior
Disney Branded Television	Disney XD
A&E Networks
A&E TV channels	A&E
A&E TV channels	Crime & Investigation
A&E TV channels	FYI
A&E TV channels	Vice Media, Inc.: Viceland
Lifetime Entertainment Services	Lifetime
Lifetime Entertainment Services	Lifetime Movies
Lifetime Entertainment Services	Lifetime Real Women
History TV channels	History
History TV channels	H2
History TV channels	Military History
History TV channels	History en Español

Production studios

Division	Studio
Disney Branded Television	Disney Television Animation
Disney Branded Television	It's a Laugh Productions
Disney Television Studios	ABC Signature
Disney Television Studios	20th Television
Disney Television Studios	20th Television Animation
Disney Television Studios	Walt Disney Television Alternative
Disney Television Studios	Hulu Originals: Onyx Collective
Disney Television Studios	FX Productions (joint with FX Networks)
A&E Networks	A+E Studios: A&E IndieFilms; A+E Films; A+E Networks Digital

=== Other former assets ===
- Toon Disney
- Jetix
- ESPN Classic
- Soapnet
- ABC Kids
