= On the Red Carpet =

- Genre: Entertainment news
- Presented by: Rachel Smith
- Country of origin: United States
- Original language: English
- No. of seasons: 4

Production
- Executive producer: Pam Chen
- Camera setup: 22 minutes
- Production company: KABC-TV

Original release
- Network: KABC-TV
- Release: March 14 – September 12, 2010
- Network: LWN
- Release: October 2010 – September 13, 2014

On The Red Carpet (OTRC) is an American syndicated show which carries celebrity news, Hollywood events and features about celebrity style produced by ABC Owned Television Stations for KABC-TV and Disney–ABC Domestic Television.

== History ==
On the Red Carpet was originally launched in 2002 as an effort by KABC to brand their local coverage of the Academy Awards leading into the national coverage from ABC. They decided to continue the site and build the traffic.

On March 14, 2010, the Sunday after the Academy Awards, On the Red Carpet was launched as a weekly series for KABC. Seven other ABC Owned Television Stations soon carried the show, with San Diego ABC affiliate KGTV San Diego also following.

The show began to be carried by the national digital subchannel, the Live Well Network, also owned by AOTS, in the fall of 2010, with the addition of Chris Balish, as co-host. Balish left the show in 2012. The series produced their live Oscar special in 2012, which featured the college journalist winners of the Academy of Motion Picture Arts and Sciences's Red Carpet Journalist Contest assisting in the interviews.

The show moved from the Live Well Network to national syndication on September 14, 2013 with a return to a single host, mainly on ABC affiliates and usually airing on Saturday or Sunday afternoons against sports on other networks.

On June 27, 2014, the OTRC.com website was shut down with the show using social media instead for content releases. The syndicated program ended production with their September 13, 2014 edition, but the On the Red Carpet banner will remain for KABC's Oscars coverage in the future. In recent years, OTRC has expanded to include coverage of other awards shows and film festivals.

== Format ==
In its form, On The Red Carpet aired for half an hour every Sunday evening at 6:30 p.m. on KABC and is designed as a weekend slotted show with stations scheduling it in the access hour and late-fringe time-slots. The series was sold on an all-barter basis to stations with the ad split, 4 minutes local and three three-and-a-half minutes national per episode.

It was hosted by Miss USA 2007 winner Rachel Smith and produced by KABC-TV’s news department. The episodes are shot on location instead of in studio. The show is composed of celebrity news, exclusive set visits, first looks at upcoming film and television projects, and one-on-one interviews with Hollywood talents and celebrities.
