= Aaron LaBerge =

American technology executive (born 1973)

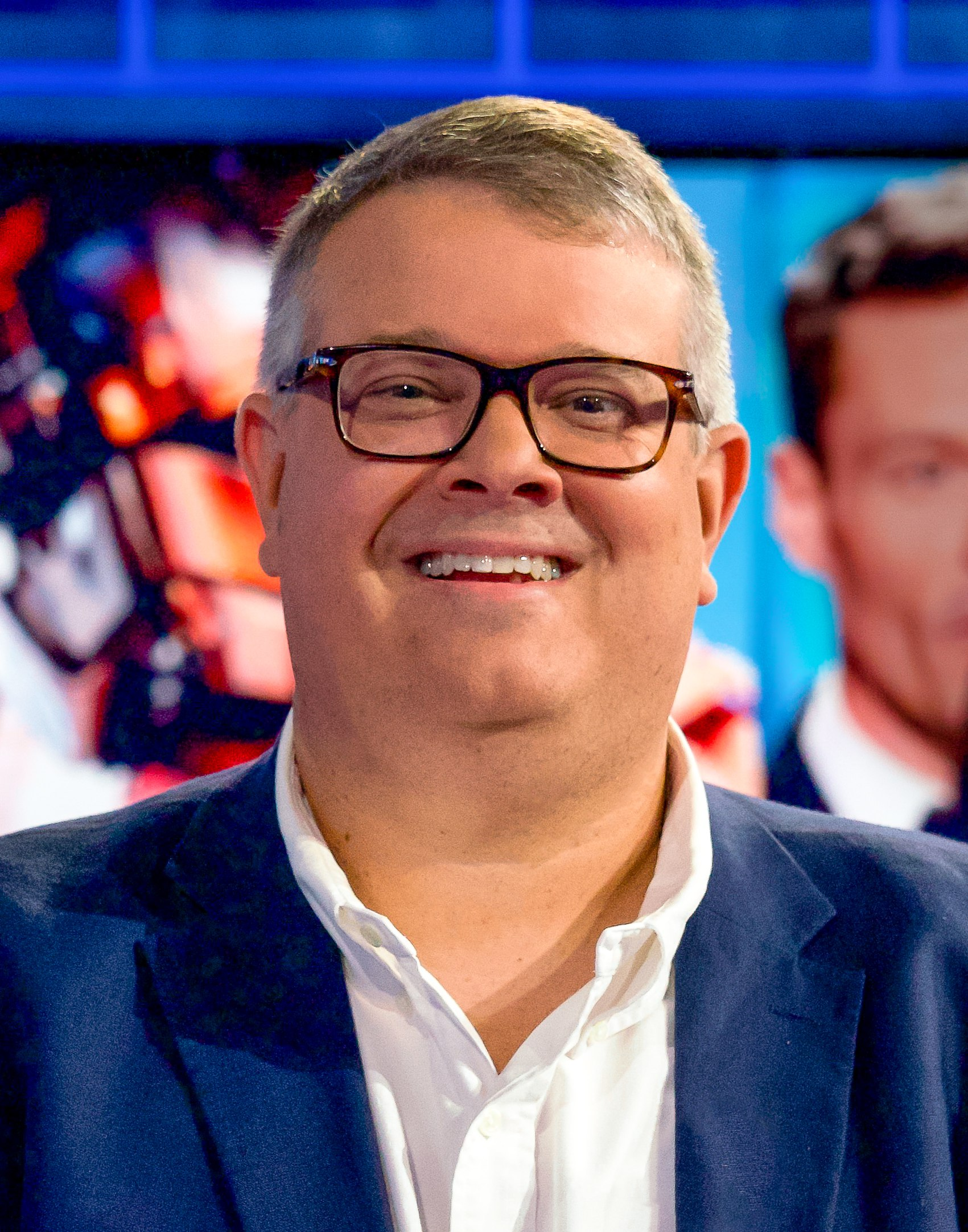
- LaBerge in 2019
- Born: January 1973 (age 52); Charleston, South Carolina, U.S.
- Education: Electrical & Computer Engineering B.S., University of South Carolina
- Occupation: Technology Executive
- Employer: Penn Entertainment (2024–present)
- Title: Chief Technology Officer of Penn Entertainment
- Children: 3

Aaron LaBerge is an American technology executive and the chief technology officer (CTO) of Penn Entertainment. Prior, he was the president and chief technology office of Disney Entertainment and ESPN., where he was responsible for linear and digital media distribution technology, ad technology, consumer data platforms, and the development of all streaming and consumer-facing digital products for the company globally. It was announced that he was leaving Disney on April 22, 2024.

== Early life ==
LaBerge was born in Charleston, South Carolina and went on to attend the University of South Carolina in Columbia, South Carolina; he graduated with a B.S. in Computer Science & Engineering in 1996.

== Career ==
LaBerge joined The Walt Disney Company in 1997 after Disney acquired Starwave Ventures. He worked in a variety of technology roles, at Disney, until 2007. Before Starwave Ventures, he was a senior software engineer at Renaissance Interactive, which specialized in Internet-based content management and publishing.

From 2007 to 2013, LaBerge was CEO of a venture-funded consumer software company he co-founded, Fanzter Inc. He directed the development of the business and the launch of its consumer-focused Internet and mobile suite of products.

LaBerge served as the CTO of ESPN starting from 2015 and served as an advisor on the Disney Research Advisory Board. During his tenure at ESPN as a senior vice president starting in 2013, LaBerge was instrumental in the construction and design of ESPN's second Digital Center in Bristol, Connecticut.

In 2018, LaBerge was named EVP and CTO of Walt Disney Direct-to-Consumer & International and first reported to Kevin A. Mayer, who was chairman of the segment at the time. In 2020, LaBerge became CTO of the new Disney Media and Entertainment Distribution segment chaired by Kareem Daniel. And in February 2023, he was named President and CTO of Disney Entertainment and ESPN.

In July 2024, LaBerge joined Penn Entertainment as CTO, where he oversees the company’s technology strategy and its Interactive Division, which includes products such as theScore, ESPN BET, theScore Bet, and iCasino platforms.

== Recognition ==
LaBerge is a two-time Emmy award winner. He won his first Sports Emmy in 2016 as an Innovator for his involvement with Megacast and was nominated the same year for the ESPN Pylon Camera. In 2024, he received his second Sports Emmy for Outstanding Technical Team Studio for his contributions to the NFL Draft.

He was featured in Variety’s inaugural Digital Innovators list as an executive who is looking to “set a new bar” using “tech to directly connect and engage with audiences.”
