= Richard H. Frank =

American businessman

Richard H. Frank is an American entertainment executive who served chairman of Walt Disney Television and Telecommunications (1994 to 1995) and as president of the Disney Studios (1985 to 1994).

== Career ==
Richard Frank was president of the Paramount Television Group in 1985. became president of Disney Studios under chair Jeffrey Katzenberg starting 1985. In August 1994 with the departure of Katzenberg, its filmed entertainment business, Disney Studios, was split into two, with the newly created Walt Disney Television and Telecommunications under Frank as chair. At the end of his contract on April 30, 1995, Frank left Disney. After he left Disney, he started a Comcast-affiliated firm, C3, then sold control in 1997. The company became Integrated Entertainment Partners and later merged into The Firm.

Frank currently owns Frank Family Vineyards, a Napa Valley winery with four estate vineyards, and sits on the board of eco-friendly goods firm TerraCycle. In October 2009, Frank invested in and took a seat on the board of mobile marketing and advertising venture The Hyperfactory.
