= Disney–ABC Domestic Television =

In-home sales and content distribution firm of the Disney–ABC Television Group

- Trade name: Disney–ABC Home Entertainment and Television Distribution
- Formerly: Buena Vista Television LLC (1985–2007)
- Type: Subsidiary
- Industry: Television syndication
- Founded: March 7, 1985; 41 years ago
- Headquarters: Walt Disney Studios, Burbank, California, US
- Area served: Worldwide
- Parent: Walt Disney Studios (1985–1994); Walt Disney Television and Telecommunications (1994–1996); Disney-ABC Television Group (1996–2018); Disney Media and Entertainment Distribution (2018–2023); Disney Entertainment (2023–present)
- Website: disneyabc.tv

Disney–ABC Domestic Television (also referred to as ABC Syndication, doing business as Disney–ABC Home Entertainment and Television Distribution, and formerly named Buena Vista Television) is the in-home sales and content distribution firm of Disney Entertainment, which is a division of The Walt Disney Company. Content distribution responsibilities include domestic television syndication, domestic pay television, Internet and cable video-on-demand (VOD), and pay-per-view outlets.

== Background ==
ABC's first syndication arm, ABC Films (established in July 1953), was spun off as Worldvision Enterprises (now CBS Media Ventures) in March 1973 due to fin-syn laws (which have since been repealed).

Despite having some television shows and feature films, Disney only had two syndicated shows, The Mickey Mouse Club and The Mouse Factory, prior to the formation of this unit.

== History ==
=== Buena Vista Television, Inc. ===
Disney established a television syndication unit in 1985, with Robert Jacquemin as senior vice president of domestic television distribution, after the company convinced Chicago film critics Gene Siskel and Roger Ebert to move their show At the Movies from Tribune Entertainment/WGN-TV at the end of the 1985–86 television season. None of its animated feature films were planned to enter syndication at the time. The division was incorporated as Buena Vista Television, Inc. on November 5, 1985, and on September 20, 1986, the second iteration of At the Movies, later re-titled Siskel & Ebert, premiered as the company's first production. The company produced the business-oriented morning show, Today's Business, in August 1986, a program that only lasted eight months due to advertising issues. In 1990, the company offered its first game show, The Challengers, into first-run syndication.

In late 1986, Buena Vista was shopping DuckTales for a 1987 debut, with a 4–6 p.m. placement and a 2.5/3.5 syndicator/station ad split. In late 1990 and early 1991, after launching The Disney Afternoon syndicated block, Buena Vista had considered starting a new one-hour morning block to start in 1992.

On August 24, 1994, a reorganization of Disney took place in which Richard H. Frank became head of a newly formed Walt Disney Television and Telecommunications, which was split from Walt Disney Studios and included Buena Vista Television. The company had absorbed the original iteration of Debmar Studios after Mort Marcus became the company's president in 1994.

In April 1996, due to the ongoing post Disney–Capital Cities/ABC Inc. merger realignment and the retirement of its president, Walt Disney Television and Telecommunications' divisions were reassigned to other groups. Therefore, Buena Vista Television, as a part of Walt Disney Television International, was transferred to Disney–ABC Television Group.

In February 1997, Buena Vista began development on the Comedy Central original daytime game show Win Ben Stein's Money, presided over by actor, financial planner, motivator and author Ben Stein. The series debuted July 27, 1997 on Comedy Central; and Jimmy Kimmel was named co-host and quizmaster opposite Stein himself.

In March 2007, Starz Inc. sued Buena Vista Television for breaching their agreement by allowing films to be available online through Apple Inc.'s iTunes Store and other outlets. The introduction of the Apple TV device forced Starz to file suit, which hinged on the "contractual definition of 'television'" and whether complete television exclusivity was granted, as Starz then had a secondary distribution deal with Netflix, which had introduced their streaming service (and eventual competitor to the future Disney+) two months earlier.

=== Disney–ABC Domestic Television ===
In May 2007, The Walt Disney Company announced plans to semi-retire the use of the Buena Vista brand in favor of focusing on the three core brands of Disney, ABC, and ESPN instead. As a result, Buena Vista Television was rebranded as Disney–ABC Domestic Television (DADT). Buena Vista Television converted to a limited liability business form on April 10, 2009.

By July 2008, Disney–ABC Domestic Television signed additional carriage agreements with Vudu and CinemaNow, which was then added to the Starz lawsuit. On December 2, 2008, Disney–ABC Domestic Television and Starz Entertainment settled their online distribution lawsuit with the terms undisclosed.

Distribution units were transferred to Walt Disney Direct-to-Consumer and International (DTCI) as part of The Walt Disney Company's March 14, 2018 strategic reorganization in anticipation of integrating 21st Century Fox's assets. In February 2020, Disney licensed 21 television series, from Ally McBeal to Witches of East End including Lost and Desperate Housewives, to Amazon-owned IMDb's ad supported streaming service. On August 10, 2020, Disney–ABC Domestic Television took over the syndication function of the original 20th Television.

== First-run programming ==
=== Current ===
- Live with Kelly and Mark (1988–present) produced by WABC-TV
- Tamron Hall (2019–present) produced by Summerdale Productions and ABC News
- Weekend Adventure (2011–present) E/I programming block from Hearst Media Production Group; exclusively for ABC affiliates

==== Films ====
The Walt Disney Studios libraries (including Walt Disney Pictures, Marvel Studios, Lucasfilm, 20th Century Studios, Searchlight Pictures, Touchstone Pictures and Hollywood Pictures)

=== Off-net syndication ===
- Family Guy (2007–present)
- The Simpsons (1994–present)
- Modern Family (2013–present)
- Bob's Burgers (2015–present)
- Last Man Standing (2016–present)
- Black-ish (2018–present)

=== Former ===
- At the Movies (1986–2010), originally Siskel & Ebert & the Movies/At the Movies with Ebert and Roeper
- Bill Nye the Science Guy (1993–1998), with KCTS Seattle and Rabbit Ears Productions
- Debt (1996–1998), with Faded Denim Productions and Lifetime
- Ellen (1994–1998), with The Black/Marlens Company and Touchstone Television
- FABLife (2015–2016), with Summerdale Productions and The Tyra Banks Company
- Land's End (1995–1996), with Fred Dryer Productions and Skyvision Partners
- Legend of the Seeker (2008–2010)
- Iyanla (2001–2002)
- Katie (2012–2014)
- Nightmare Ned (1997) (seen on sister network ABC)
- On the Red Carpet (2013–2014)
- Right This Minute (2016–2022) produced by MagicDust Television, Cox Media Group, Gray Television and E. W. Scripps Company. Previously distributed in syndication by Raycom Media from 2011 to 2013 and MGM Worldwide Television and Digital Distribution from 2013 until 2016.
- Pickler & Ben (2017–2019), with E. W. Scripps Company, Happy Street Entertainment and Sandbox Entertainment
- Teen Win, Lose or Draw (1989–1992), with Burt & Bert Productions, Kline & Friends and Stone Stanley Entertainment
- The Challengers (1990–1991), with Dick Clark Productions and Ron Greenberg Productions
- The Disney Afternoon (1990–1997)
  - Adventures of the Gummi Bears (1985–1991)
  - DuckTales (1987–1990)
  - Chip 'n Dale: Rescue Rangers (1989–1990)
  - TaleSpin (1990–1991)
  - Darkwing Duck (1991–1992)
  - Goof Troop (1992)
  - Bonkers (1993–1994)
- Sing Me a Story with Belle (1995-1997), with Patrick Davidson Productions
- Sabrina: The Animated Series (1999–2000), with DIC Productions L.P., Riverdale Productions and Kent/QMA, Savage Studios Ltd. and Hartbreak Films
- Bone Chillers (1996), with Hyperion Pictures and The Fred Silverman Company
- The Tony Danza Show (2004–2006), with Riverward Productions and Katie Face Productions
- The Wayne Brady Show (2001–2004)
- Win Ben Stein's Money (1997–2003), with Valleycrest Productions and Skydance's Comedy Central
- Your Big Break (1999–2001)
- Who Wants to Be a Millionaire (1999–2019), with Valleycrest Productions, Times Square Studios, and 2waytraffic (Show format originally created by Celador; currently owned by Sony Pictures Television); 2020 reboot produced by Valleycrest Productions (2020–2021), Embassy Row and Kimmelot (distributed in India by Sony Pictures Television)
