= Disney Media and Entertainment Distribution =

Defunct Disney business segment

- Formerly: Walt Disney Direct-to-Consumer & International (2018–2020)
- Type: Division
- Predecessor: Walt Disney International; Walt Disney Direct-to-Consumer & International; Disney Media Networks
- Founded: March 14, 2018; 8 years ago
- Defunct: February 8, 2023; 3 years ago
- Fate: Moved to Disney Entertainment as part of the reorganization of all Disney divisions following the company’s larger reorganization
- Successor: Disney Entertainment
- Headquarters: Walt Disney Studios, Burbank, California, U.S.
- Area served: Worldwide
- Key people: Aaron LaBerge (EVP and CTO)
- Brands: Disney+; Disney+ Hotstar; ESPN+; Hulu; Star+; Disney XD; Movies Anywhere
- Services: Film distribution, film promotion, music recording, music publishing, over-the-top streaming
- Parent: The Walt Disney Company
- Divisions: Disney Platform Distribution; Disney Advertising Sales
- Subsidiaries: ABC Owned Television Stations; Disney Streaming; Disney Digital Network
- Website: dmedmedia.disney.com

Disney Media and Entertainment Distribution (DMED), formerly Walt Disney Direct-to-Consumer & International (DTCI), was a business segment of the Walt Disney Company that operated from March 14, 2018 until the establishment of its successor, Disney Entertainment on February 8, 2023. It consisted of Disney Streaming (previously known as BAMTech and Disney Streaming Services) and Disney International Operations (which is now split up). Disney Media and Entertainment Distribution's fate was a success as of to when Disney–ABC Domestic Television still held up business

On October 12, 2020, former CEO Bob Chapek initiated a reorganization of Disney's media and entertainment divisions, which included a dissolution of DTCI and a split of its business segments into Disney International Content and Operations and Disney Media and Entertainment Distribution. Until 2023, the business segment consisted Disney's streaming services, its advertising sales division and its linear television networks, along with broadcast, cable and international syndication. Its focus was on strategic monetization of titles from Disney's three content groups: Studios, General Entertainment, and ESPN & Sports.

On February 8, 2023, returning CEO Bob Iger began to re-organize all Disney divisions as part of the company's larger reorganization, which included the move of DMED's responsibilities into a new Disney Entertainment division overseeing all filmed and screen content and its networks and streaming venues, excluding ESPN and sports broadcasting operations.

== Background ==
In 1997, Disney and Sony Pictures formed a film distribution joint venture in Southeast Asia which covered five countries. From 1999 to 2000, Bob Iger was president of Walt Disney International and chairman of ABC TV Group. until he was promoted to president and chief operating officer of the Walt Disney Company.

Michael O. Johnson, later CEO of Herbalife, was president of Walt Disney International from 2000 - 2003.

Andy Bird became the next president of Walt Disney International in 2004. At the time of Bird's appointment, most countries' units except in Latin America operated independently. He took the Latin America-integrated operation as a guide for other regions. Strategically, Bird wanted their companies to be the Walt Disney Company of India and other countries, not the Walt Disney Company of a certain country, basically tailoring the company to the country with, for example, localization of programming. Diego Lerner, who led Disney Latin America, was thus named President of Disney Europe, Middle East & Africa in 2009.

Buena Vista International and Sony Pictures Releasing International formed fourteen distribution joint ventures, including in Mexico, Brazil, Thailand, Singapore and the Philippines. Another Buena Vista-Sony distribution joint venture was set up in Russia in December 2006.

The Walt Disney Company's CIS office in Russia opened in 2006. The company's original plan was for to release three films per year. In 2009, Disney CIS released its first Russian language-film, The Book of Masters which took in 10.8 million on a budget of $8 million. By April 2011, the company announced that director Vladimir Grammatikov was hired by the company as creative producer, while two more Russian films were placed into production: A fairy tale and a youth story. Instead, the country's unit took a seven-year hiatus until they announced the production on The Last Knight in April 2016. On November 26, 2017, the film became the highest-grossing local-language release of all time in Russia, with a gross of 1.68 billion rubles ($28.8 million).

In 2014, Walt Disney International appointed Luke Kang to head its Greater China unit. Disney's South East Asia managing director Rob Gilby appointed three managers for Indonesia, Philippines and Thailand, who were Herry Salim, Veronica Espinosa-Cabalinan, and Subha-Orn Rathanamongkolmas (Soupy) respectively, in May 2017.

Paul Candland was promoted from president of Walt Disney Japan to president of the Walt Disney Company Asia, consisting of Japan, Korea, Southeast Asia, and Greater China in July 2014. Stanley Cheung was also promoted from managing director to chairman of TWDC Greater China. Both reported to Andy Bird, chairman of Walt Disney International.

With the retirement of the Asia unit's head Paul Candland after 19 years in September 2017, Disney split the Asia unit into two: North Asia and South Asia. North Asia consists of Japan, South Korea and Greater China and is headed by Kang, while South Asia combined India and South East Asia. The India unit's head Mahesh Samat would assume leadership of the South Asia unit by October 1, and the South East Asia unit's head Gilby left the company. Later in September, Lerner was transferred to a new position within Walt Disney International, with Rebecca Campbell, the then-president of ABC Daytime and ABC Owned Television Stations, named to replace him as president of Disney EMEA. In February 2017, Sony Pictures withdrew from the Philippines-distribution joint venture, followed by a withdrawing in August 2017 from the remainder of the Southeast Asian distribution joint venture with Disney.

In November 2015, Disney UK started Disney's test streaming service, DisneyLife, with Disney films, TV series, books and music tracks, under general manager Paul Brown. The original plan had the service spreading to other countries in Europe, including France, Spain, Italy and Germany in 2016. In October 2017, the Republic of Ireland was the second country where DisneyLife was made available. DisneyLife was launched in China in December 2017 through a partnership between Disney and Alibaba Digital Entertainment, only to have the Chinese government shut it down in August 2018 because of foreign content rules. Instead, in February 2018, Disney and Alibaba reached a new deal that placed Disney content on Alibaba's Youku streaming platform. On May 25, 2018, DisneyLife was expanded to the Philippines, making it the third country where the service was available. In 2019, following the announcement of the UK Disney+ release date, Disney revealed that existing service DisneyLife would be folded into Disney+.

In August 2016, the Walt Disney Company acquired a 1/3 stake in BAMTech for $1 billion, with an option to acquire a majority stake in the said company the future. On August 8, 2017, Disney announced that it would increase its ownership in the company to a 75% controlling stake for $1.58 billion. Disney also reiterated its plan to launch an ESPN-branded over-the-top service in early-2018, followed by a Disney-branded direct-to-consumer streaming service in 2019.

== History ==
=== As Walt Disney Direct-to-Consumer and International (2018–2020) ===
Walt Disney Direct-to-Consumer and International logo used from March 14, 2018, until October 12, 2020.

Walt Disney Direct-to-Consumer and International (DTCI) were formed as part of the Walt Disney Company’s March 14, 2018, strategic reorganization in anticipation of integrating 21st Century Fox's assets, with units coming from all of the other segments. Kevin Mayer was named as the new segment's chairman. With the restructuring, Disney International chairman Andy Bird is expected to leave the Walt Disney Company. On May 25, 2018, Walt Disney Direct-to-Consumer and International was incorporated.

ESPN+ would officially launch on April 12, 2018. BAMTech was renamed to Disney Streaming Services by October 10, 2018. At that time, ESPN's chief technology officer Aaron LaBerge was named to the new position as executive vice president and chief technology officer of DTCI Technology, leading a group that combined technologists and teams from across multiple parts of the Walt Disney Company.

On October 31, 2018, ESPN International's executive vice president and managing director Russell Wolff was named executive vice president and general manager of ESPN+, reporting to Disney Streaming Services (formerly BAMTech Media). ESPN International's regional general managers started reporting to DTCI's regional leadership.

The post-merger organization of the company was announced on December 13, 2018, with Lerner and Campbell remaining over the Latin American and EMEA regions. The EMEA region added Russia and Commonwealth of Independent States countries, while a new Asia Pacific region would replace South Asia and North Asia. Disney named Uday Shankar, who previously served as president of Fox Asia and chairman of the Star India, as head of the new region and chair of Disney India. The three regional heads and Janice Marinelli, president of global content sales and distribution, would report to Mayer. Mahesh Samat, South Asia's head, moved to Disney Parks, Experiences and Consumer Products as executive vice president of Disney Consumer Products for Asia Pacific in late November 2018. The Acquisition of 21st Century Fox by Disney was completed on March 20, 2019, with Disney International took ownership of Fox's networks outside the United States.

Shankar announced the Asia-Pacific unit's management team on April 1, 2019. The team included former several Fox executives, including Star Regional Media Networks' K Madhavan as head of Star India's regional language channels and Kurt Rieder as studio chief of Asian Pacific, with India's film operations reporting separately. Certain other Fox executives left the company in the reorganization, including head of international distribution Andrew Cripps, and Zubin Gandevia, head of Fox Networks Group in Asia Pacific and the Middle East. Disney's Malaysia and Singapore head Amit Malhotra would lead emerging markets and South Asia Pacific content sales, reporting to Shankar. Chafic Najia, a Disney senior vice president, was promoted to the Middle East'x media cluster manager. Disney's Australia and New Zealand manager Kylie Watson-Wheeler added media networks and direct-to-consumer to her responsibilities.

In July 2019, Marinelli announced her resignation, ending a 34-year long tenure with the company. Disney announced it would combine all the company's media sales and channel distribution into one organization. ESPN's executive vice president Justin Connolly was promoted to the newly created role of president of media distribution, reporting to Mayer.

On January 31, 2020, it was announced that Hulu CEO Randy Freer would be stepping down, as the position of CEO was removed, with all Hulu executives now reporting directly to corresponding DTCI business heads. Hulu's original programming team would continue reporting to chairman of Disney Television Studios and ABC Entertainment and FX on Hulu to the FX chairman.

On March 12, 2020, Vanessa Morrison, who previously served as President of Fox Family and Fox Animation, was appointed President of Streaming for Walt Disney Studios Motion Picture Production and will oversee development and production of Disney+ film content from the Walt Disney Studios for both Disney Live Action and 20th Century Studios. Morrison answers directly to head of Walt Disney Studios Motion Picture Production Sean Bailey.

On May 18, 2020, Mayer stepped down as DTCI chairman to become the CEO of TikTok. He was succeeded by Rebecca Campbell, who was previously the president of Disneyland Resort. This was soon followed by the transfer of the sales division (ad and distribution) to Disney Media Networks.

On August 4, 2020, Disney announced that it would launch a Star-branded streaming service in 2021. This will be a general entertainment service, featuring content from ABC Signature, 20th Television, FX, Freeform, 20th Century Studios and Searchlight Pictures. The streaming service will be integrated with Disney+ in most countries.

=== As Disney Media and Entertainment Distribution (2020–2023) ===
On October 12, 2020, it was announced that Disney would effectively restructuring its media and entertainment businesses, which resulted in the dissolution of Disney Media Networks and Walt Disney Direct-to-Consumer & International, thus two business segments being created in their place: Disney International Content and Operations, responsible for managing the international operations of the Walt Disney Company; and Disney Media and Entertainment Distribution, responsible for handling the company's streaming services, advertising operations, and its linear and syndicated television networks.

Disney Media and Entertainment Distribution was formed as part of the Walt Disney Company's media and entertainment structural reorganization, which took place October 12, 2020, and made primarily due to the success of Disney's streaming services, mainly Disney+. Kareem Daniel was named as the chairman for the new segment. As part of this reorganization, Walt Disney Direct-to-Consumer & International along with Disney Media Networks were dissolved and two business segments were created in their place: Disney International Content and Operations, focused on Disney's international subsidiaries, and Disney Media and Entertainment Distribution, focused on said streaming services, its advertising divisions, and Disney's linear and syndicated television networks.

Following the segment's financial losses in Q4 2022, Bob Iger was reinstated as Disney's CEO and announced that he would replace DMED with a new structure that gives decision-making and operational control back to the creative teams. As part of the impending restructure, Daniel exited as chairman of DMED. DMED was dismantled in February 2023, as part of Iger's reorganization of the company into three new segments.

== Units ==
=== Current ===
==== Disney Streaming (Direct-to-consumer & Technology) ====
- Disney+
  - Star (Disney+)
- ESPN+ (full control, 80% stake)
- Hulu (full control, 67% stake)
- Disney+ Hotstar (known as Hotstar in Canada, Singapore and the United Kingdom)
- Star+

==== Ad sales ====
- Disney Advertising Sales
  - Disney Creative Works

==== Digital products ====
- Disney Digital Network
- FiveThirtyEight
- Movies Anywhere

==== Networks ====
- ABC Owned Television Stations
  - Localish (operated by Walt Disney Television US)
- Disney XD (operated by Disney Branded Television US)

==== Platform distribution ====
- Disney Platform Distribution
  - Walt Disney Studios Motion Pictures - theatrical exhibition
  - Walt Disney Studios Home Entertainment - home media distribution
    - El Capitan Theatre
  - Domestic Television Distribution
  - International Television Distribution
  - Disney Music Group - music recording and publishing

=== Former ===
==== Digital products ====
- DTCI Technology
- DTCI Digital Media

==== Transferred ====
| Unit | From | Years |
|---|---|---|
| Disney Digital Network | Disney Consumer Products and Interactive Media | 2018–2020 |
| BAMTech (75%) | Disney corporate strategy office | 2018—2020 |
| Walt Disney Studios Home Entertainment: Movies Anywhere | Walt Disney Studios | 2018—2020 |
| Disney–ABC Domestic Television | Walt Disney Television (WDT) | 2018—2020 |
| Disney Channels Worldwide (International) | Walt Disney Television (WDT) | 2018—2020 |
| Hulu (30%) | Walt Disney Television (WDT) | 2018—2020 |
| ABC News Digital and Live Streaming: ABC News Live; FiveThirtyEight | Walt Disney Television (WDT) | 2018—2020 |
| Disney Media Distribution | Walt Disney Television (WDT) | 2018—2020 |
| DATG advertising sales | Walt Disney Television (WDT) | 2018—2020 |
| ESPN sales and marketing | ESPN Inc. | 2018—2020 |
| ESPN International regional businesses | ESPN Inc. | 10/2018—10/2020 |
| Star India; Hotstar; Tata Sky (30%); Fox Telecolombia (51%); Fox Networks Group; Fox Star Studios; Rede Telecine; Hulu (30%) | 21st Century Fox | 2019—2020 |
| Walt Disney International South Asia: The Walt Disney Company India; UTV Software Communications; The Walt Disney Co. (Philippines) Inc.; The Walt Disney Co. (Southeast Asia) Pte Ltd. (Singapore); The Walt Disney Co. (Malaysia) Sdn Bhd; PT Walt Disney Indonesia; The Walt Disney (Thailand) Company Limited; The Walt Disney Company (Vietnam) | Walt Disney International | 2018–2020 |
| The Walt Disney Company EMEA: Super RTL (50%, owned by Mediagroup RTL Germany) | Walt Disney International | 2018–2020 |
| Walt Disney International North Asia: The Walt Disney Company (Japan) Co., Ltd.; Walt Disney Greater China; The Walt Disney Company (China) Ltd.; The Walt Disney Company (Taiwan) Ltd.; The Walt Disney Company (Korea) LLC. | Walt Disney International | 2018–2020 |
| The Walt Disney Company Latin America | Walt Disney International | 2018–2020 |
