= Disney Entertainment Television =

Television assets division of Disney

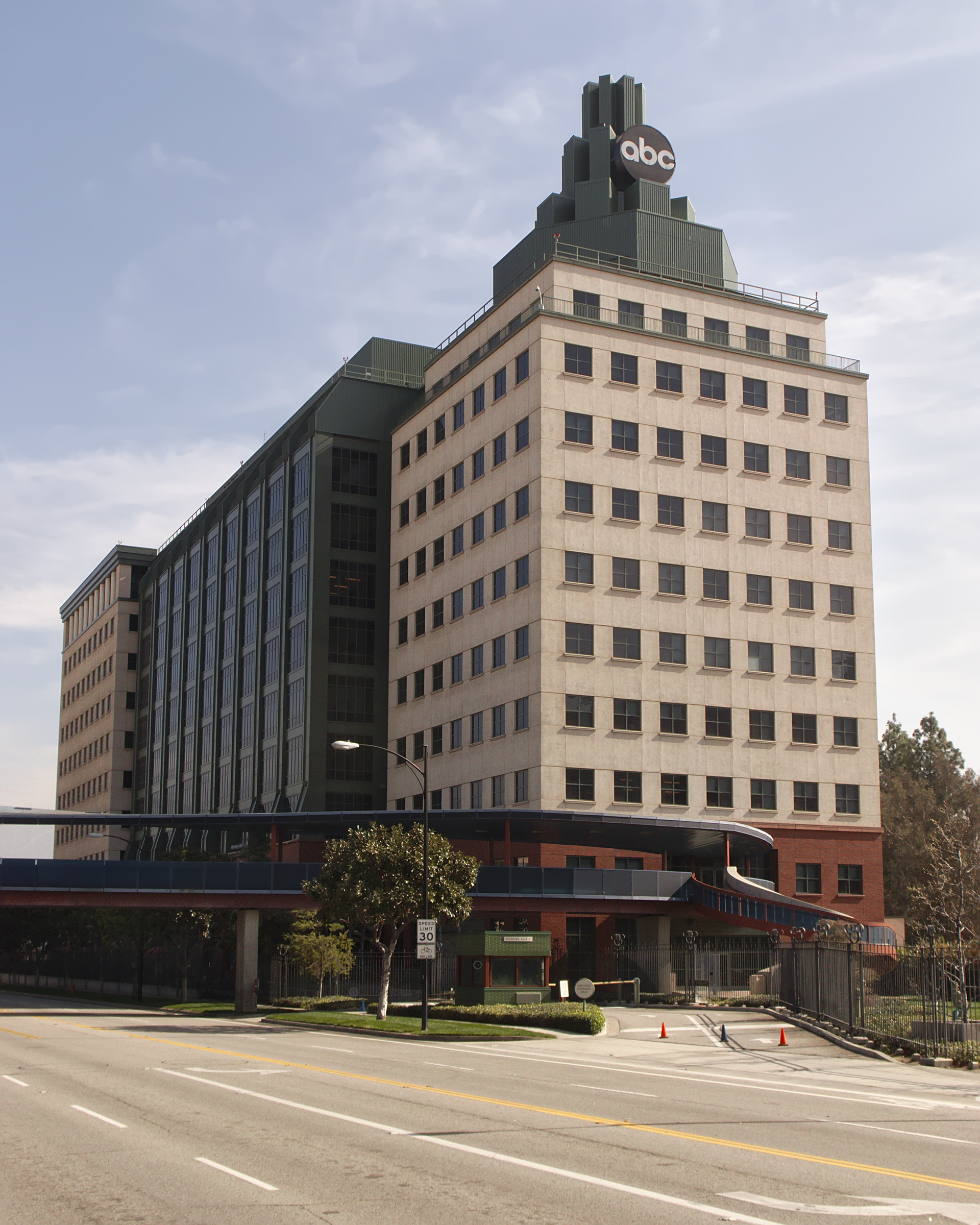
- Headquarters at the building on the Walt Disney Studios Riverside Drive property in Burbank, California
- Formerly: ABC Group (1996–2004); Disney–ABC Television Group (2004–2019); Walt Disney Television (2019–2021); Disney General Entertainment Content (2021–2023)
- Type: Division
- Industry: Broadcast; Cable television; Mass media
- Predecessors: Capital Cities/ABC; ABC Family Worldwide; Fox Networks Group
- Founded: September 5, 1996; 30 years ago
- Headquarters: Walt Disney Studios, Burbank, California, U.S.
- Area served: Worldwide, but mainly United States
- Key people: Debra OConnell (chairwoman)
- Products: Television channels; Television programming
- Brands: ABC; ABC News; Freeform; Disney Channel; Disney Jr.; Disney XD; FX; FXX; FX Movie Channel; Onyx Collective; National Geographic; Nat Geo Wild
- Services: Television production and distribution
- Number of employees: 7,000+ (2016)
- Parent: Disney Media Networks (1996–2020); The Walt Disney Company (2020–2023); Disney Entertainment (2023–present)
- Divisions: Disney Kids & Family
- Subsidiaries: ABC Family Worldwide; American Broadcasting Company; Disney Television Studios; FX Networks; National Geographic Global Networks; Onyx Collective
- Website: Official website

Disney Entertainment Television, formerly ABC Group, Disney–ABC Television Group, the second incarnation of Walt Disney Television (Note: Preceded by the first incarnation/phase of Walt Disney Television, which used the name from 1988 to 2003.) and Disney General Entertainment Content, (Note: Alternatively known by the official website copyright tagline "Disney General Entertainment" (DGE).) is a division of the Disney Entertainment business segment of the Walt Disney Company that oversees its owned-and-operated television content, assets and sub-divisions.

Founded on September 5, 1996, sub-divisions of DET include the American Broadcasting Company, ABC News, Disney Kids & Family, Disney Television Studios, Freeform, FX Networks, Hulu Original Content Teams, and National Geographic.

== History ==
=== ABC Group ===
Capital Cities/ABC Inc. merged and folded into the Walt Disney Company in 1996 and was initially re-branded as ABC Group. Assets from CC/ABC at the time being merged and/or acquired include/included the ABC Television Network Group, CC/ABC Broadcasting Group (ABC Radio Network, later Cumulus Media Networks, 8 TV and 21 radio stations), ABC Cable and International Broadcast Group, CC/ABC Publishing Group and CC/ABC Multimedia Group to the fold. The Cable and International Broadcast Group contained ownership shares of ESPN Inc. (80%), A&E Television Networks (37.5%), DIC Productions, L.P. (Limited Partnership stake), Lifetime Television (50%) and its international investments. These investments included Telephone-München (now Leonine Holding) (50%, Germany; included 20% of RTL II), Hamster Productions. (33%, France) and Scandinavian Broadcasting System (23%, Luxembourg). ESPN also had international holdings: Eurosport (33.3%, England), TV Sport (10%, France; Eurosport affiliate) and The Japan Sports Channel (20%). The Publishing Group including Fairchild Publications, Chilton Publications, multiple newspapers from a dozen dailies (including the Ft. Worth Star-Telegram, The Kansas City Star) and more weeklies, and dozens more publications in the fields of farm, business and law trade journals plus LA Magazine to Institutional Investor. ABC Group pursued businesses in new and emerging media technologies, including the interactive television, pay-per-view, VOD, HDTV, video cassette, Optical disc, on-line services and location-based entertainment.

In April 1996, due to the ongoing post Disney-CC/ABC merger realignment and retirement of its president, the Walt Disney Television and Telecommunications group's division was reassigned to other groups with Walt Disney Television International (including Disney Channels International and Buena Vista Television domestic syndication and pay-TV divisions, GMTV and Super RTL holdings) were transferred to Capital Cities/ABC. In May due to the merger, ABC ended its ABC Productions division operations while keeping its boutique production companies: Victor Television, DIC Productions, L.P., ABC/Kane Productions and Greengrass Productions. The international operations of Disney TV International and ABC Cable and International Broadcast Group were merged in June as Disney/ABC International Television.

Under Disney, ABC Group sold various publishing companies in 1997. Chilton was sold to Reed Elsevier for $447 million and received $142 million from Euromoney Publications for Institutional Investor. In April, Knight Ridder purchased four newspapers including The Kansas City Star and The Fort Worth Star-Telegram for $1.65 billion. In August 1999, Fairchild Publications was sold to Condé Nast for $650 million. In March 1998, ABC placed it shares of Scandinavian Broadcasting System up for sale.

In late 1999, Walt Disney Television, along with other television units, were transferred again from The Walt Disney Studios to Disney–ABC Television Group and merged with ABC's primetime division, ABC Entertainment, forming ABC Entertainment Group. Robert A. Iger was promoted from president and chief operating officer in February 1999 to chairman of ABC Group and president of Walt Disney International.

In March 2000, ABC formed the Disney Kids Network (DKN) advertising group via consolidation to sell ads for ABC's "TGIF" primetime programming, Disney's One Saturday Morning, the Disney's One Too syndicated programming block, Who Wants to Be a Millionaire, The Wonderful World of Disney, Mickey Mouse and Winnie the Pooh primetime specials. DKN was placed under senior vice president of sales at ABC, Dan Barnathan, and would also work on some ads with Radio Disney, Disney.com and the Disney Adventures magazine. DKN added Toon Disney when the channel started accepting ads in September 2000.

Iger was named president and chief operating officer of The Walt Disney Company in January 2000. In 2000, with an investment by Bain Capital and Chase Capital Partners, Heyward re-purchased DIC Entertainment, L.P. from Disney, making the company re-independent

In September 2002, then-Disney Chairman/CEO Michael Eisner outlined a proposed realignment of the ABC broadcast network's daytime parts with the similar unit in its cable channels: ABC Saturday mornings with Disney Channel units (Toon Disney & Playhouse Disney), ABC daytime with Soapnet and ABC prime time with ABC Family. In October 2003, ABC Family Worldwide was changed from a unit directly reporting to the Disney COO to a unit running within the ABC Cable Networks Group under Anne Sweeney.

=== Disney–ABC Television Group ===
Former logo as Disney–ABC Television Group from 2013 to 2019.

In 2004, Disney announced a restructuring of its Disney Media Networks division with Sweeney being named president of Disney–ABC Television Group, and then-ESPN president George Bodenheimer becoming co-CEO of the division with Sweeney, as well as president of ABC Sports. This move added ABC TV Network within Disney–ABC. ABC1 channel initially launched in the United Kingdom on September 27, 2004 as the first use of the ABC brand outside the US. While ABC News Now was launched that year in the US on digital subchannel of 70 ABC owned & operated and affiliates.

In 2007, the previous iteration of Touchstone Television was renamed ABC Television Studio as part of Disney's push to drop secondary brands like Buena Vista for Disney, ABC, ESPN, and most recently, A&E Networks. ABC1 in the UK was shut down on September 26, 2007.

In 2007, Disney spun off its ABC Radio Networks and merged it into Citadel Communications with Citadel Broadcasting while retaining its ESPN Radio and Radio Disney networks and stations and a 10-year news provider licensing agreement with Citadel for ABC News Radio and the networks.

In 2009, Disney–ABC announced a merger of ABC Entertainment and ABC Studios into ABC Entertainment Group. That April, ABC Enterprises took an ownership stake in Hulu in exchange for online distribution license and $25 million in the ABC network ad credits. The Live Well Network (LWN) was launched on April 27, 2009, by ABC Owned Television Stations on the stations' subchannels. Later that year, A+E Networks acquired Lifetime Entertainment Services with DATG ownership increasing to 42%. In November, Disney-ABC sells GMTV to ITV for $37 million.

In 2012, following the dissolution of the ABC Daytime division, ABC Family Worldwide began taking operational control of Soapnet until that network was slowly discontinued for Disney Junior.

Also in 2012, NBCUniversal confirmed plans to sell its 15.8% stake in A+E Networks to Disney for $3 billion (along with its previous owner Hearst Entertainment & Syndication, who became 50-50 partners in the joint venture).

In 2013, Disney–ABC announced it would lay off 175 employees. The layoffs covered positions among technical operations as well as the unit's eight local stations. Despite the downsizing, ABC News and Univision Communications launched Fusion, a cable Hispanic news and satire channel later in 2013.

In 2014, A+E took a 10% stake in Vice Media for $250 million, then in 2016 rebranded H2 into the Vice channel. Disney also directly made two $200 investments in Vice Media in November 2015, plus an additional investment of 10% to assist in funding its programming. ABC Family became Freeform on January 12, 2016.

In 2016, Disney–ABC sold its share in Fusion to Univision. In September 2016, the group's president Ben Sherwood named Bruce Rosenblum, Television Academy chairman and former head of Warner Bros. TV Group, as president of business operations in s the newly created position, to reduce the number of direct reports from 17 to about 8. Roseblum would oversee ad sales in conjunction with channel heads, affiliate sales and marketing, engineering, digital media, global distribution, IT, research and strategy and business development. This allows Sherwood to focus on content and direct operating units that continue to directly report to him, ABC network units, cable channel units (Disney Channels Worldwide, and Freeform), ABC Studios and ABC TV Stations.

With the 2018, Disney Company reorganization, in anticipation of integrating Fox assets from a proposed acquisition, all international channels including Disney Channels have been transferred to Walt Disney Direct-to-Consumer and International, a new segment, with American channels remaining with Disney–ABC Television Group. All global sales units and distribution units have been transfer to the Disney Direct-to-Consumer segment.

=== Walt Disney Television ===
Former logo as Walt Disney Television from March 20, 2019 to February 3, 2021.

In 2018, Disney announced the division would be rebranded as the second incarnation of Walt Disney Television following the completion of its acquisition of 21st Century Fox. The acquisition added 20th Century Fox Television, FX Networks and FX Productions, Fox 21 Television Studios and National Geographic Global Networks to the division.

Fox television executives Peter Rice, Dana Walden, John Landgraf and Gary Knell joined The Walt Disney Company on March 20, 2019. Craig Hunegs was named to lead the combined Disney Television Studios — ABC Studios, ABC Signature, 20th Century Fox Television and Fox 21 Television Studios. He would report to Walden.

Following the completed acquisition of the 21st Century Fox assets in 2019, Disney reorganized its television division to align various operations. They announced that both Disney Television Studios and FX Entertainment would share the same casting division. After assuming full control over Hulu in 2019, Disney reorganized Hulu's reporting structure, placing Hulu's Scripted Originals team under Walt Disney Television. Under the new structure, Hulu's SVP of Original Scripted Content would report directly to the chairman of Disney Television Studios and ABC Entertainment.

In 2020, Disney Television Studios rebranded all of its three studios as part of merger terms which required dropping the "Fox" name from assets acquired from 21st Century Fox, with 20th Century Fox Television becoming 20th Television; Fox 21 Television Studios became the second incarnation of Touchstone Television to avoid brand confusion with Fox Corporation; and ABC Studios merged with the original incarnation of ABC Signature Studios to form the current ABC Signature. In addition, the original syndication arm of 20th Century Fox Television also called "20th Television" was folded into Disney–ABC Domestic Television.

=== Disney General Entertainment Content ===
Former logo as Disney General Entertainment Content from October 12, 2020 to July 1, 2025

In 2020, the division was rechristened as Disney General Entertainment Content. Touchstone Television merged and was folded into 20th Television.

In 2021, Disney Television Studios established a new unit known as "Walt Disney Television Alternative", which will be headed by former senior vice president of alternative, specials and late-night series at ABC, Rob Mills, to oversee the development of non-scripted programming.

=== Disney Entertainment Television ===
In 2023, the division was again rechristened as Disney Entertainment Television, according to a news article from Deadline Hollywood. In 2024, ABC Signature was folded into 20th Television.

In early 2026, Debra Oconnell was named chairman of the division after Dana Walden was named President and Chief Creative Officer of The Walt Disney Company.

== Leadership ==
- Debra OConnell, Chairman
  - Naomi Bulochnikov-Paul, Executive Vice President, Communications
  - Steve Chung, Chief Counsel
  - Sean Cocchia, Executive Vice President, Programming Strategy and Business Operations
  - Ayo Davis, President, Disney Kids & Family
  - Joe Earley, President, Disney Entertainment Television Franchise and Content Strategy
    - Sean Cocchia, Executive Vice President, Programming Strategy and Business Operations
    - Josh Sussman, Executive Vice President, Business Affairs
    - Carol Turner, Head of Production, Disney Entertainment Television
    - Jon Wax, Executive Vice President, International Original Television
  - Craig Erwich, President, Disney Television Group
    - Karey Burke, President, 20th Television
    - Rob Mills, Executive Vice President, Unscripted and Alternative Entertainment
    - Marci Proietto, Executive Vice President, 20th Television Animation
    - Simran Sethi, President, Scripted Programming, Hulu Originals, ABC Entertainment and Freeform
      - Jordan Helman, Executive Vice President, Drama
      - Suzanna Makkos, Executive Vice President, Comedy
    - Sharon Klein, Head of Casting
  - Rita Ferro, President, Global Advertising
  - Trisha Husson, Head of Strategy and Operations
  - Almin Karamehmedovic, President, ABC News
  - Chad Matthews, President, ABC Owned Television Stations
  - Courteney Monroe, President, National Geographic
  - Jen Reberger, Executive Vice President, People and Culture
  - Shannon Ryan, President, DTC and Disney Entertainment Television Marketing
  - Carol Turner, Head of Production
    - Atiya Henry, Executive Vice President of Production, Disney Branded Television
  - Jimmy Zasowski, President, Platform Distribution

== Units ==
=== Current structure ===
As of July 2025, the following are the current units based on reporting structure:

==== Disney Television Studios ====
- 20th Television
- 20th Television Animation
- Walt Disney Television Alternative

==== Disney Television Group ====
- ABC
- Hulu Originals
- ABC Family Worldwide
  - Freeform
- Disney Kids & Family
  - Disney Channel
  - Disney Jr.
  - Disney XD
  - Disney+ Originals
  - Production units
    - Disney Television Animation
    - It's a Laugh Productions
    - Disney Original Documentary
- Disney Unscripted and Alternative Entertainment
- FX Networks
  - FX
  - FXX
  - FX Movie Channel
  - FX Entertainment
    - FX Productions
- National Geographic Partners
  - National Geographic Global Networks
    - National Geographic
    - Nat Geo Wild
    - Nat Geo Mundo
    - National Geographic Studios
  - National Geograpfic Documentary Films
  - National Geographic Magazine
- Onyx Collective

==== News Group and Networks ====
- ABC News
  - ABC Audio
    - ABC News Radio
  - ABC News Studios
- Networks
  - ABC Owned Television Stations

=== Former units ===
Transferred to Disney Media and Entertainment Distribution (DMED)

- Disney XD
- ABC Owned Television Stations

Re-organizational transfers 2018
These assets were transferred to Walt Disney Direct-to-Consumer & International (then Disney Media and Entertainment Distribution) in 2018, which include:

- Walt Disney Studios Home Entertainment – formerly Buena Vista Home Entertainment
  - Disney–ABC Domestic Television – also known as Disney–ABC Home Entertainment and Television Distribution and formerly Buena Vista Television
- Disney Media Distribution – formerly Disney–ABC International Television and before that, ABC Cable and International Broadcast Group
- Disney Branded Television - international channels only
  - Broadcast Satellite Disney Co., Ltd. (April 2009–2018) – operator of Dlife channel (Japan)
  - Hungama TV (2006–2018)
- Buena Vista International Television Investments
  - RTL Disney Television Limited Partnership, 50% (–2018)
  - Tele Munich Television Media Participation Limited Partnership, 50%
    - RTL 2 Television Limited Partnership, 31.5% (1994–2018)
      - RTL II (Germany)
- Super RTL (1995–2021) Germany
  - Kividoo subscription video-on-demand (2015)
  - Toggo Plus (2016)

Others

- ABC Radio Networks (1945–2007) sold to Cumulus Media
  - American Contemporary Network (January 1, 1968)
  - American Information Network (January 1, 1968)
  - American Entertainment Network (January 1, 1968)
  - American FM Network (January 1, 1968)
  - ABC Rock Radio Network (January 4, 1982)
  - ABC Direction Radio Network (January 4, 1982)
  - ABC Talk Radio (1980s)
  - Urban Advantage Network (UAN)
- Radio Disney Group (2003–2014) sold individual stations except one.
- Walt Disney Television (1999–2003)
- Disney MovieToons/Disney Video Premieres (1996–2003) launched as a part of Disney TV Animation; transferred out to Walt Disney Feature Animation (now Walt Disney Animation Studios).
- DIC Entertainment, L.P. (1996–2000) sold back to Andy Heyward.
- Jetix – merged into Disney Channels Worldwide (now Disney Branded Television).
- ABC News Now (2004–2009) digital subchannel network.
- Touchstone Television (2020) folded into 20th Television

==== Walt Disney Television and Telecommunications ====
Unit	Transferred to
KCAL-TV Los Angeles	Sold to Young Broadcasting
Walt Disney Television	Walt Disney Studios
Disney Television Animation	Walt Disney Studios
Touchstone Television	Walt Disney Studios
Disney Interactive	Walt Disney Studios
Buena Vista Home Entertainment	Walt Disney Studios
Walt Disney Film & Television Awards	Walt Disney Studios
Walt Disney Television International	CC/ABC
Disney Channel International	CC/ABC
Buena Vista Television	CC/ABC
GMTV	CC/ABC
Super RTL	CC/ABC
Disney TeleVentures	Defunct as of 2000

Walt Disney Television and Telecommunications (WDTT) was a division of The Walt Disney Company. At the time Disney and Capital Cities/ABC merged, WDTT's divisions were The Disney Channel, KCAL-TV Los Angeles, Walt Disney Television, Touchstone Television, Buena Vista Home Entertainment, and Disney Interactive.

===== WDTT history =====
In 1994, with Jeffrey Katzenberg's resignation, a reorganization of Disney took place in which Richard H. Frank became head of newly formed Walt Disney Television and Telecommunications, which was split from its filmed entertainment business, Walt Disney Studios. Later that year, Walt Disney Computer Software was transferred within WDTT as Disney Interactive. At the end of his contract in 1995, Frank left Disney. Dennis Hightower, a marketing executive, was appointed by April 9 to succeed Frank.

In 1996, due to ongoing post-Disney-CC/ABC merger realignment and the retirement of Hightower as president, WDTT's divisions were reassigned to other groups, with most of them transferred to either The Walt Disney Studios or CC/ABC. KCAL was sold to Young Broadcasting in 1996 due to CC/ABC ownership of KABC-TV.

== See also ==
- Fox Networks Group (1993–2024)
- American Broadcasting Company
- List of production companies owned by the American Broadcasting Company
- ESPN Inc.
