= Disney Entertainment =

Entertainment business segment of Disney

- Type: Division
- Predecessor: Disney Media and Entertainment Distribution
- Founded: February 8, 2023; 3 years ago
- Headquarters: Walt Disney Studios, Burbank, California, U.S.
- Area served: Worldwide
- Key people: Dana Walden, President and CCO; Alan Bergman (Chairman, Disney Entertainment, Studios); Debra OConnell (Chairman, Disney Entertainment Television)
- Parent: The Walt Disney Company
- Divisions: Disney–ABC Domestic Television; Disney Entertainment Television; Disney Games Group; Disney Platform Distribution; Disney Streaming; The Walt Disney Company Latin America; Disney India; Walt Disney Studios; Walt Disney Studios Motion Pictures

Disney Entertainment is one of the three major business segments of The Walt Disney Company. It was established on February 8, 2023, as part of a company-wide restructuring that separated Disney's entertainment, sports and experiences businesses.

The division encompasses Disney's film and television studios, television networks, streaming services, and games and digital entertainment businesses. It includes Walt Disney Studios, Disney Entertainment Television, Disney+, Hulu, and the Disney Games Group. The segment is led by Dana Walden, president and chief creative officer of The Walt Disney Company.

== History ==
On November 20, 2022, The Walt Disney Company announced the dismissal of CEO Bob Chapek and the return of his predecessor, Bob Iger. The following day, Iger announced the departure of Kareem Daniel, chairman of Disney Media and Entertainment Distribution (DMED), and plans to restructure the company. He tasked Alan Bergman, Dana Walden, James Pitaro and Christine McCarthy with developing a new organizational structure aimed at returning decision-making authority to Disney's creative teams and reducing costs.

On February 8, 2023, Disney announced a corporate restructuring that established Disney Entertainment, with Bergman and Walden serving as co-chairmen. The new segment consolidated The Walt Disney Studios, Disney General Entertainment Content, Disney Streaming, Disney Platform Distribution and the company's international entertainment operations. Later that month, Walden reorganized Disney General Entertainment Content, placing National Geographic and Onyx Collective under FX Networks chairman John Landgraf and combining Freeform with ABC Entertainment.

== Leadership ==
- Dana Walden, President and Chief Creative Officer
  - Asad Ayaz, Chief Marketing and Brand Officer
  - Alan Bergman, Chairman, Disney Entertainment, Studios
  - Tony Chambers, President, EMEA
  - John Landgraf, Chairman, FX and Onyx Collective
    - Gina Balian, President, FX Entertainment
    - Tara Duncan, President, Onyx Collective
    - Nick Grad, President, FX Entertainment
    - Stephanie Gibbons, President, Creative, Strategy and Digital, Multi-Platform Marketing, FX
  - Martin Iraola, President, The Walt Disney Company Latin America
  - Luke Kang, President, Asia Pacific
  - Debra OConnell, Chairman, Disney Entertainment Television
  - Sean Shoptaw, Executive Vice President, Global Games and Digital Entertainment
  - Adam Smith, Chairman, Direct-to-Consumer
    - Lauren Tempest, General Manager, Hulu

== Units ==
=== Walt Disney Studios ===
Divisions	Sub-divisions
Walt Disney Pictures	Walt Disney Animation Studios
Walt Disney Pictures	Pixar Animation Studios
Walt Disney Pictures	Disneynature
20th Century Studios	20th Century Animation
20th Century Studios	20th Century Family
20th Century Studios	20th Century Games
20th Century Studios	20th Century Comics
20th Century Studios	New Regency Productions (20%): New Regency Television International
Searchlight Pictures	Searchlight Television
Searchlight Pictures	Searchlight Shorts
Marvel Studios	Marvel Studios Animation
Marvel Studios	Marvel Music
Marvel Studios	Marvel Film Productions LLC
Marvel Studios	MVL Development LLC (Delaware)
Marvel Studios	MVL Productions LLC
Lucasfilm	Lucasfilm Animation
Lucasfilm	Lucasfilm Games
Lucasfilm	Lucas Licensing: LucasBooks (licensed book publishing imprint)
Lucasfilm	Lucas Online
Lucasfilm	Lucasfilm Story Group
Lucasfilm	Skywalker Sound
Lucasfilm	Industrial Light & Magic: ILM San Francisco; ILM Vancouver; ILM London; ILM Sydney; ILM Mumbai; ILM Art; ILM Immersive; ILM StageCraft; ILM Technoprops; ILM TV
Walt Disney Studios Motion Pictures	Buena Vista International: Buena Vista Theatres, Inc. (basically) El Capitan Entertainment Centre; Disney Studio Store; El Capitan Theatre; Hollywood Masonic Temple; Buena Vista International Latin America; Buena Vista International Brazil; Patagonik Film Group (33.3%); Walt Disney Japan; Walt Disney Studios Marketing; Worldwide Special Events
Walt Disney Studios Home Entertainment	20th Century Home Entertainment

==== Disney Theatrical Group ====
Divisions	Assets
Disney Theatrical Productions	
Disney Live Family Entertainment	Disney on Ice (licensed)
Disney Live Family Entertainment	Disney Live (licensed)
Disney Live Family Entertainment	Marvel Universe Live! (licensed)
Disney Live Family Entertainment	Walt Disney Special Events Group
Disney Theatrical Licensing	
New Amsterdam Development Corp.	New Amsterdam Theatre (long-term lease)
New Amsterdam Theatrical Productions, Inc.	
Walt Disney Theatrical Worldwide, Inc.	
Buena Vista Theatrical	
Buena Vista Theatrical Ventures, Inc.	
Buena Vista Theatrical Merchandise, LLC	

==== Disney Music Group ====
Divisions	Assets	Note
Walt Disney Records		
Hollywood Records	DMG Nashville	
Buena Vista Records		Revived as a joint country label with Universal Music Group Nashville.
S-Curve Records		
RMI Recordings		A joint "digital-first" talent label with the founders of DigiTour Media
Disney Concerts		
Disney Music Publishing	Agarita Music	
Disney Music Publishing	Buena Vista Music Co.	
Disney Music Publishing	Falferious Music	
Disney Music Publishing	Five Hundred South Songs	
Disney Music Publishing	Fuzzy Muppet Songs	
Disney Music Publishing	Holpic Music, Inc.	
Disney Music Publishing	Hollywood Pictures Music	
Disney Music Publishing	Pixar Music	
Disney Music Publishing	Pixar Talking Pictures	
Disney Music Publishing	Seven Peaks Music	
Disney Music Publishing	Seven Summits Music	
Disney Music Publishing	Touchstone Pictures Music & Songs, Inc.	
Disney Music Publishing	Utapau Music	
Disney Music Publishing	Mad Muppet Melodies	
Disney Music Publishing	Marvel Comics Music	
Disney Music Publishing	Walt Disney Music Company	
Disney Music Publishing	Wampa-Tauntaun Music	
Disney Music Publishing	Wonderland Music Company	

==== Disney Consumer Products ====
Operations	Assets
Global licensing	Licensed consumer products
Publishing	Disney Publishing Worldwide

==== Disney Studio Services ====
Divisions	Assets	Note
Disney Digital Studio Services – Studio Post Production		
Studio Production Services	Walt Disney Studios (Burbank)	
Studio Production Services	Golden Oak Ranch	
Studio Production Services	Prospect Studios	
Studio Production Services	KABC7 Studio B	
Studio Production Services	Pinewood Studios	Most of the studio is under a 10-year lease from Pinewood Group.
Studio Production Services	Disney Studios Australia	

=== Disney Entertainment Television ===
Divisions	Sub-divisions
Disney Television Studios	20th Television
Disney Television Studios	20th Television Animation
Disney Television Studios	Walt Disney Television Alternative
Disney Platform Distribution	Disney–ABC Home Entertainment and Television Distribution
ABC Entertainment	ABC: George Stephanopoulos Productions; Rock 'n Robin Productions
ABC Entertainment	ABC Owned Television Stations: 8 owned-and-operated ABC stations; Localish
ABC Entertainment	ABC News (Live): ABC Audio; ABC News Radio; ABC News Studios
Disney Kids & Family	Disney Channel
Disney Kids & Family	Disney Jr.
Disney Kids & Family	Disney XD
Disney Kids & Family	Disney Television Animation
Disney Kids & Family	It's a Laugh Productions
Disney Kids & Family	Disney Original Documentary
ABC Family Worldwide	Freeform
ABC Family Worldwide	BVS Entertainment
FX Networks	FX
FX Networks	FXX
FX Networks	FX Movie Channel
FX Networks	FX Entertainment: FX Productions
National Geographic Partners	National Geographic Global Networks: National Geographic; Nat Geo Wild; Nat Geo Mundo; National Geographic Studios
National Geographic Partners	National Geographic Documentary Films
National Geographic Partners	National Geographic Magazine
Onyx Collective

=== Disney Streaming ===
Asset	Subdivision	Notes
Disney+	Streamboat Willie Productions LLC	
Hulu	Hulu Documentary Films	
Hulu	Hulu + Live TV	
Hulu	HJ Holdings	Joint venture with Nippon Television Network Corporation, LY Corporation, Toho, Yomiuri Telecasting Corporation, and Chukyo TV. Broadcasting Co., Ltd.)
Star		Only offered in Japan as of October 8, 2025
ESPN (72%)		Joint venture with Hearst Communications and National Football League
FuboTV (70%)		
JioHotstar		36.84% joint venture between Disney India, Viacom18, and Reliance Industries
NHL.tv		
Movies Anywhere		

=== Disney Games Group ===
Divisions	Sub-divisions
Disney & Pixar Games	
Marvel Games	
Lucasfilm Games	
20th Century Games	

=== International businesses ===
Divisions	Notes
International Network Brands
BabyTV	
Cinecanal	Offered in Latin America
Disney Channel	
Disney Jr.	
Disney XD	
Dlife	Offered in Japan; formerly Fox
National Geographic Global Networks	73% with National Geographic Society
FX	
24Kitchen	
Star Channels	
Star Sports (China)	Offered in China Mainland
Now	Offered in Turkey; formerly Fox
Regional Operations
The Walt Disney Company Europe, Middle East and Africa	
The Walt Disney Company Latin America	
The Walt Disney Company Asia Pacific	

== Programs ==
- List of Disney television series
- List of Disney Television Animation productions
- List of programs broadcast by Disney XD
- List of programs broadcast by Disney Channel
- List of 20th Television programs
