= Disney Jr. =

American television network

- Logo used since 2024
- Country: United States
- Broadcast area: Nationwide
- Headquarters: Burbank, California, U.S.

Programming
- Languages: English; Spanish (via SAP audio track)
- Picture format: HDTV 720p (downscaled to letterboxed 480i for the SD feed)

Ownership
- Owner: Disney Entertainment (The Walt Disney Company)
- Parent: Disney Kids & Family
- Sister channels: List: ABC; Disney Channel; Disney XD; Freeform; FX

History
- Launched: February 14, 2011; 15 years ago (as a block on Disney Channel); March 23, 2012; 14 years ago (as a channel)
- Replaced: Soapnet (as a network); Playhouse Disney (Disney Channel preschool block)

Links
- Webcast: Watch live
- Website: www.disneynow.com

Availability

Streaming media
- Affiliated streaming service: Disney+
- Service(s): DirecTV Stream, Fubo TV, Hulu + Live TV, Sling TV, YouTube TV

Disney Jr. is an American pay television network owned by the Disney Kids & Family, a sub-division of the Disney Entertainment business segment of the Walt Disney Company. Aimed mainly at children two to seven years of age, its programming consists of original first-run television series, films, and select other third-party programming.

As of November 2023, Disney Jr. is available to approximately 45,000,000 pay television households in the United States, down from its 2015 peak of 74,000,000 households. In recent years, Disney Jr.'s carriage has declined with the growth of streaming alternatives, including its parent company's Disney+, and has generally been depreciated by Disney in current retransmission consent negotiations with cable and streaming providers. Notably, the channel was removed in negotiations with Verizon Fios in 2025, and was unavailable on Charter Spectrum from 2023 to 2025.

== History ==
=== Origins ===
The Walt Disney Company first attempted to launch a 24-hour subscription channel for preschoolers in the United States, when the company announced plans to launch Playhouse Disney as a television channel, named after Disney Channel's daytime programming block of the same name, which launched on the channel on February 1, 1999 (airing during the morning hours seven days a week, with the weekday blocks lasting until the early afternoon). Plans for the United States network were ultimately canceled. However, channels using the Playhouse Disney moniker were launched in other countries internationally.

The development of Disney Junior began on May 26, 2010, when Disney–ABC Television Group announced the launch of the channel as a pay television service, which would compete with other subscription channels targeted primarily at preschool-aged children in addition to the Playhouse Disney branded blocks and channels being rebranded under Disney Junior.

The flagship channel in the United States intended to replace Soapnet, a Disney-owned channel featuring daytime soap operas seen on the major broadcast networks (including sister network ABC) and reruns of primetime drama series, due to the continued decline in popularity and quantity of soap operas on broadcast television, along with the growth of video on demand services (including the online streaming availability for soap operas) and digital video recorders that negated the need for a linear channel devoted to the genre.

=== Network and block launches ===
Disney Junior first launched as a programming block on Disney Channel on February 14, 2011. The Disney Junior channel was originally scheduled to launch in January 2012, but on July 28, 2011, the Disney-ABC Television Group postponed the channel's launch date to an unspecified date in early 2012, then on January 9, 2012, the Disney-ABC Television Group announced that Soapnet's closing date for most cable providers was scheduled for March 22, 2012. Disney Junior's 24-hour subscription channel counterpart officially launched the following day on March 23, at 12:00 a.m. Eastern Time. Programming featured on the channel's initial lineup included Jake and the Never Land Pirates, Mickey Mouse Clubhouse, and Doc McStuffins (which premiered around this time); the channel also aired new episodes of the short-form series A Poem Is. as well as the weekend movie block, the Magical World of Disney Junior.

Although Disney Junior had replaced the channel space held by Soapnet on most providers, an automated feed of that channel continued to broadcast for providers that had not yet reached agreements to carry Disney Junior, or to prevent losing subscribers due to the network's closure. These included some providers such as Cox Communications, Cablevision/Optimum, DirecTV, Verizon FiOS, and Time Warner Cable, which continued to carry Soapnet while having added the Disney Junior channel onto their channel lineups on a different channel space. Soapnet's operations continued sixteen months later than had been originally planned, until the network's shutdown on December 31, 2013, at 11:59 p.m. Eastern Time.

In 2012, Disney Junior launched a movie night anthology as the Magical World of Disney Junior. The channel also premiered its first Disney Junior Original Movie, Lucky Duck, during Magical World on June 20, 2014. The morning block of Disney Jr. programming on Disney Channel itself is currently known as Mickey Mornings.

The network's visual identity changed in June 2024, with a new logo shortening 'Junior' to the abbreviated form, 'Jr.'.

=== Television carriage ===
At its launch, Disney Junior was initially available to subscribers of Xfinity, Time Warner Cable, Cablevision, Bright House Networks, and Verizon FiOS; other providers would sign carriage agreements to run the network following its launch.

Disney–ABC Television Group announced that it had reached a distribution agreement with the National Cable Television Cooperative to carry Disney Junior, which negotiates carriage deals on behalf of many of America's smaller cable providers.

In December 2012, Cox signed a distribution deal with Disney adding Disney Junior to its cable plans.

On July 13, 2012, DirecTV announced that the Disney Junior network would be added to its lineup the following day on July 14. Industry observers questioned both the unexpected announcement and untraditional weekend launch of the network as being timed to a nine-day carriage dispute between DirecTV and Viacom which lead to Viacom's television channels (including Nickelodeon and Nick Jr. Channel) being temporarily unavailable on the service four days prior as a result of the dispute.

On December 31, 2012, Charter Communications (later purchasing Time Warner Cable and Bright House Networks and becoming Spectrum) came to terms with Disney–ABC Television Group on a new wide-ranging multiple-year carriage agreement for ABC, all of the American-based Disney Channels Worldwide and ESPN networks and ABC Family, which included the addition of Disney Junior to Charter systems throughout the first quarter of 2013. The channel was removed from the service on August 31, 2023 as Disney and Spectrum were in dispute for several days, before coming to agreement on September 11 to restore Disney's networks to their service while removing several others, including Disney Junior. The channels that were dropped (including Disney Jr.) were eventually reinstated in summer 2025 under a new carriage arrangement.

On January 15, 2013, AT&T U-verse also reached a deal with The Walt Disney Company on a new wide-ranging multi-year agreement to carry the Disney–ABC Television Group family of networks and ESPN, which included the addition of Disney Junior.

Dish Network, the last major television provider to have not signed a carriage deal for Disney Junior, added the channel on April 10, 2014; after a long period of acrimony and a six-month extension of their previous carriage agreement with The Walt Disney Company for a few select networks (some of which were not available in HD, partly as a result of a 2011 dispute with the company), Dish and Disney came to full terms on carrying all of Disney-ABC's networks in both standard and high definition on March 3, 2014, with the resolution of legal issues involving Dish's Hopper DVR system, which also included streaming rights for the networks as part of Dish's IPTV streaming service Sling TV.

== Programming ==
=== Disney Junior Night Light (block) ===
Disney Junior Night Light is the former name of Disney Jr. channel's overnight programming block, running daily from 9:00 p.m. to 4:00 a.m. Eastern and Pacific. The block, which debuted on September 4, 2012, was sponsored by the Disney-owned parenting site Babble, consisting of short-form programs intended for co-viewing among parents and their children. Features seen as part of the block included Picture This (a drawing segment), Sesh Tales (a segment featuring costumed finger puppets with twists on traditional fairy tales) and That's Fresh (a segment featuring cooking tips aimed at parents, presented by celebrity chef Helen Cavallo). Additional series under development at the block's launch included a photography series, a series that follows parents through the day their new baby comes home after being born, and a show about stay-at-home dads. Since 2017, Disney Jr.'s overnight programming has run unbranded and without the Night Light continuity.

== Related services ==
Service	Description
Disney Jr. HD	Disney Jr. HD is a high definition simulcast of the Disney Jr. channel that broadcasts in the 720p resolution format (the recommended HD format for the Disney-ABC Television Group's free-to-air and pay television properties). Most providers began carrying it upon Disney Junior's launch in most areas and use a downscaled version to provide their standard definition feeds. DirecTV began carrying Disney Junior's HD feed on August 15, 2012.
Disney Jr. On Demand	Disney Jr. On Demand is the channel's video-on-demand service, offering select episodes of Disney Jr.'s original series. It is available to most subscription-based providers that carry the network.
DisneyNOW	On September 28, 2017, the Disney Channel app was relaunched as DisneyNOW, which combines the apps of Disney Channel, Disney Jr., Disney XD and Radio Disney into one universal app featuring access to all four services. The Disney Junior app was discontinued on February 15, 2018.
Disney+	Disney+ is a subscription video-on-demand streaming service owned and operated by the Disney Streaming division of The Walt Disney Company which contains Disney Jr. content as well as some programming from Playhouse Disney.
Former services
Disney Junior App	Formerly known as "WATCH Disney Junior" until a June 2016 rebranding, the mobile app and digital media player viewing apps for Disney Junior offer live and on-demand streaming of Disney Junior content online. These apps require users to authenticate with a login from a participating television service provider access to live video or the newest episodes. A limited selection of free episodes also is available without a login. The app closed on February 15, 2018, as it merged it with the DisneyNow app, along with its sister channels: Disney Channel and Disney XD.

== International ==
Disney Jr. also broadcast globally, but some channels have been shutting down since 2020 to prioritize Disney+, which features its current and library programming.
