= Onyx Collective =

American content brand

- Country: US
- Network: Hulu

Ownership
- Owner: Disney Entertainment
- Parent: Disney Entertainment Television
- Key people: Tara Duncan (president)

History
- Launched: May 17, 2021; 5 years ago

Links
- Website: www.dgepress.com/onyxcollective

Onyx Collective is a content brand owned and operated by Disney Entertainment, which primarily consists of projects from creators of color and other underrepresented groups. The brand was first launched on May 17, 2021, with several projects under development for Hulu and Disney+.

Onyx Collective is currently led by Tara Duncan, who prior also served as the president of sister channel Freeform before shifting focus solely towards Onyx.

== History ==
In April 2021, Dana Walden first mentioned the existence of a new BIPOC-focused programming initiative at Disney General Entertainment Content and Hulu. Following the official launch of the brand on May 17, 2021, Onyx announced a number of upcoming projects produced by notable black creators including Questlove, Oprah Winfrey, and Prentice Penny. Their first content acquisition, Summer of Soul, received a limited theatrical release in partnership with Searchlight Pictures on June 25, 2021, to critical acclaim before being released on Hulu the following weekend.

In September 2021, Onyx Collective and Hulu greenlit the legal drama Reasonable Doubt for a series order, marking the first scripted series from the brand.

== Programming ==
=== Comedy ===
Title	Genre	Premiere	Seasons	Length	Status
Unprisoned	Comedy	March 10, 2023	2 seasons, 16 episodes	30 min.	Canceled
The Other Black Girl	Satirical comedy	September 13, 2023	1 season, 10 episodes	24–31 min.	Canceled
How to Die Alone	Comedy	September 13, 2024	1 season, 8 episodes	30 min.	Canceled
Deli Boys	Comedy	March 6, 2025	2 season, 16 episodes	30 min.	Canceled

=== Drama ===
Title	Genre	Premiere	Seasons	Length	Status
Reasonable Doubt	Legal drama	September 27, 2022	3 seasons, 29 episodes	46–55 min.	Renewed
Awaiting release
The X-Files	Science fiction	TBA	TBA	TBA	Series order; pilot filmed

=== Documentaries ===
Title	Production partner	Premiere	Runtime
Summer of Soul	Searchlight Pictures	July 2, 2021	1 hour, 57 min.
Beba	Neon	June 24, 2022	1 hour, 20 min.
Aftershock	ABC News	July 19, 2022	1 hour, 26 min.
Anthem	This Machine Filmworks	June 28, 2023	1 hour, 37 min.
Sly Lives! (aka The Burden of Black Genius)	RadicalMedia, MRC and Sony Music Entertainment	February 13, 2025	1 hour, 52 min.

==== Docuseries ====
Title	Production partner	Premiere	Seasons	Length	Status
The Hair Tales	OWN	October 22, 2022	6 episodes	41 min.	Miniseries
The 1619 Project	Lionsgate Studios	January 26, 2023	6 episodes	55–61 min.	Miniseries
Black Twitter: A People's History	N/A	May 9, 2024	3 episodes	60 min.	Miniseries
Searching for Soul Food	All3Media	June 2, 2023	8 episodes	23-27 min.	Miniseries
Vow of Silence: The Assassination of Annie Mae	Laylow Pictures, Nine Stories Productions	November 26, 2024	4 episodes	51-53 min.	Miniseries

=== Feature films ===
Title	Genre	Release date	Runtime
Bruiser	Drama	February 24, 2023	1 h 41 min
