= Dana Walden =

American businessperson (born 1964)

- Walden in 2014
- Born: Dana Michelle Freedman; October 13, 1964 (age 61); Los Angeles, California, U.S.
- Education: University of Southern California
- Occupation: Businesswoman
- Employer(s): News Corporation (1989–2013); 21st Century Fox (2013–2019); The Walt Disney Company (2019–present)
- Title: President and CCO of The Walt Disney Company
- Board member of: Live Nation Entertainment; UCLA Jonsson Comprehensive Cancer Center; Saban Free Clinic of Los Angeles
- Spouse: Matthew Evans Walden (m. 1995)
- Children: 2

Dana Michelle Walden (née Freedman; born October 13, 1964) is an American businesswoman, who is president and chief creative officer of the Walt Disney Company. She is a former member of the President's Export Council.

== Career ==
Freedman graduated with a Bachelor of Arts in communications in 1986.

=== Bender, Goldman & Helper, Arsenio Hall Communications and Fox ===
After graduation, Walden joined a Bender, Goldman & Helper as a publicity assistant to Larry Goldman. The next year she became a junior account executive and year after that – vice president of consumer television division. In 1989, Freedman joined the Arsenio Hall Communications (which was a division of Paramount Network Television) as vice president of marketing. She held that position up until 1991. That year, Walden became a vice president of publicity in 20th Century Fox Television and Twentieth Television. From 1992 to 1997, she held positions of senior vice president of media and corporate relations, vice president of current programming and vice president of drama in 20th Century Fox Television and Twentieth Television. In 1997, Walden became senior vice president of drama in 20th Century Fox Television. In 1999, she became co-president of 20th Century Fox Television (along with Gary Newman).

In 2014, Walden became chairwoman and CEO of Fox Television Group, which included Fox Broadcasting Company, 20th Century Fox Television, Fox 21 Television Studios, Fox Consumer Products and the syndication supplier, 20th Television.

=== The Walt Disney Company ===
Walden became chairwoman of Disney Television Studios and ABC Entertainment in 2019, after acquisition of 21st Century Fox by Disney. In June 2022, Walden replaced Peter Rice as chairman of Disney General Entertainment Content.

Walden was named co-chairman of Disney Entertainment in February 2023, where she is responsible for global streaming and television. As part of this role, Walden leads ABC Entertainment, ABC News, ABC Owned Television Stations, Disney Branded Television, Disney Television Studios (20th Television, ABC Signature, 20th Television Animation and Walt Disney Television Alternative), Freeform, FX, Hulu Originals, National Geographic Content and Onyx Collective. Under her leadership, The Walt Disney Company earned a record 183 Emmy Award nominations in 2024.

In April 2024, CNBC reported that Walden was in the running to become Disney's next CEO, if chosen, she would be the first female CEO of Disney in its 100-year history.

In September 2025, Walden made the decision to put Jimmy Kimmel Live!, a late night television program airing on American Broadcasting Company (ABC), on indefinite suspension due to his comments on the previously aired episode regarding the investigation of the alleged shooter of Charlie Kirk. In his show's opening monologue on Sept. 15, Kimmel said supporters of President Donald Trump were "desperately trying to characterize" Tyler Robinson, the 22-year-old charged in Kirk's murder, as "anything other than one of them." In the week prior, Kimmel also criticized Trump for saying Democrats were responsible for Kirk's death at a Utah campus on Sept. 10. Following the announcement that the FCC would investigate these statements, Walden preemptively put the production on suspension moments before it was to be filmed, even as audience members were already on site and as Kimmel had planned to clarify his statements on the previously aired episodes. This action has been called into question by other late night television hosts, including Stephen Colbert and Jimmy Fallon, as well as entertainment industry veterans Jean Smart, Billy Eichner, and Margaret Cho. Additionally, both SAG-AFTRA and Writers Guild of America both took issue with Walden's choice to pull the program off the air. Disney ended Kimmel's suspension five days later. Kimmel praised Walden for how she handled the situation and even endorsed her in succeeding Bob Iger as CEO of the Walt Disney Company.

On February 3, 2026, Walden was promoted to president and chief creative officer of The Walt Disney Company, effective March 18, 2026. It was widely reported that Walden was a top internal candidate for the role of CEO, along with chairman of Disney Experiences Josh D'Amaro. D'Amaro was ultimately named as CEO alongside Walden's promotion.

=== Other board positions ===
Walden once sat on the board of directors for Live Nation Entertainment and currently sits at the board of directors of UCLA's Jonsson Comprehensive Cancer Center.

== Personal life ==
Walden married Matthew Walden, a business executive, in 1995. They have two daughters. As of 2024, they live in Brentwood, Los Angeles. Her grandmother Rose Freedman, an immigrant from Austria, was a survivor of the Triangle Shirtwaist Factory fire who lived to the age of 107. She is of Jewish descent.

=== Politics ===
Walden has donated to Democratic Party politicians and hosted fundraising events for the party. She and her husband have also been longtime friends of Kamala Harris and her husband, Doug Emhoff.

President Joe Biden appointed Walden to the President's Export Council and to the primary advisory committee on international trade in 2023.

== Awards and accolades ==
Walden was named MIPCOM's Personality of the Year in 2015. She has been named "Showman of the Year" by Variety and "Executive of the Year" in 2019 by The Hollywood Reporter. In 2021, Walden was given a Lifetime Achievement Award from Harvard Undergraduate Women in Business. In 2023, Walden ranked 39th in Forbes Magazine's list of "World's 100 most powerful women". She was ranked 39th on Fortune's list of Most Powerful Women in 2023.

In 2024, the Producers Guild of America announced that Walden will receive the guild's Milestone Award at the 36th Producers Guild of America Awards ceremony.

Business positions
Preceded by Vacant (Previously Bob Iger)	President of the Walt Disney Company; 2026–Present	Succeeded by
