= Disney Streaming =

Subsidiary of The Walt Disney Company

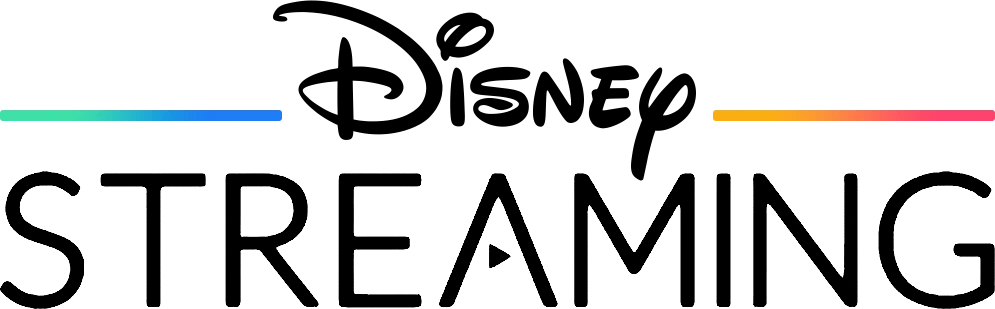
- Logo of Disney Streaming
- Formerly: BAMTech Media (2015–2018); Disney Streaming Services (2018–2021)
- Type: Business unit
- Industry: Streaming media; Video on demand
- Founded: February 2015; 11 years ago
- Founder: MLB Advanced Media
- Headquarters: New York City, New York, U.S.; Burbank, California, U.S.
- Key people: Adam Smith (Chairman, Direct-to-Consumer, Disney Entertainment)
- Brands: Disney+; Hulu; ESPN
- Services: Streaming technology and platform operations
- Parent: MLB Advanced Media (2015–2017); The Walt Disney Company (2017–2018); Walt Disney Direct-to-Consumer & International (2018–2020); Disney Media and Entertainment Distribution (2020–2023); Disney Entertainment (2023–present)

Disney Streaming, formerly known as BAMTech Media (2015–2018) and Disney Streaming Services (2018–2021), is an American streaming technology subsidiary of the Walt Disney Company, with operations in Manhattan, New York City, and Burbank, California. Established in 2015 as a spin-off of MLB Advanced Media, the digital media arm of Major League Baseball (MLB), the company specializes in video on demand technology and infrastructure for over-the-top (OTT) media services. Its technology has supported streaming services operated by ESPN, the National Hockey League (NHL), and Blaze Media.

BAMTech was initially majority-owned by MLB Advanced Media, with minority stakes held by the NHL and other investors. In August 2016, Disney invested $1 billion to acquire a 33% stake in the company. The following year, Disney increased its ownership to a controlling 75% stake through an additional $1.58 billion investment, receiving regulatory approval in September 2017. Disney subsequently acquired the NHL's remaining 10% stake in September 2021 and MLB's 15% stake in November 2022, becoming the company's sole owner.

Following Disney's acquisition of a controlling stake, BAMTech became responsible for developing the company's subscription streaming platforms, including ESPN+, launched in 2018, and Disney+, launched in 2019. Renamed Disney Streaming Services in 2018 and Disney Streaming in 2021, the business subsequently expanded its support for Disney's streaming operations, including Hulu and the former Latin American service Star+. In August 2025, ESPN+ subscriptions were transitioned to ESPN Select following the launch of ESPN's expanded direct-to-consumer streaming service, which introduced ESPN Select and ESPN Unlimited. Disney Streaming operates within the Disney Entertainment segment, supporting the company's direct-to-consumer streaming services.

== History ==
=== BAMTech Media (2015–2018) ===
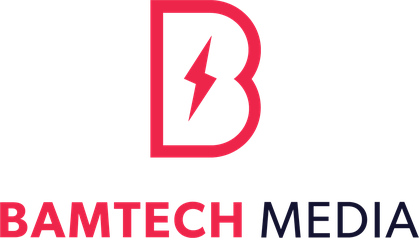
BAMTech Media logo used 2015 to 2018

BAMTech was founded in February 2015 through MLB Advanced Media, spinning-out its streaming technology business into a separate company with outside investors. The formation of the company was approved by MLB Advanced Media's board of directors on August 13, 2015. Under the plan, MLB-specific properties (such as MLB.com) would remain under league control. In August 2016, the Walt Disney Company acquired a 1/3 stake in the company for $1 billion, with an option to acquire a majority stake in the future.

On November 1, 2016, BAMTech announced a partnership with Discovery Communications to form a European joint venture known as BAMTech Europe. Its first client is Eurosport, the pan-European rights holder of the Olympic Games beginning 2018. The following month, Riot Games announced a deal with BAMTech for the company to distribute and monetize broadcasts of professional competitions in its multiplayer video game League of Legends through 2023, under which BAMTech would pay Riot at least $50 million per-year, and split advertising revenue. However, after multiple delays, the deal was shelved in 2018 (with Riot instead entering into a non-exclusive distribution deal with ESPN+ to include its content on the platform).

On February 21, 2017, Michael Paull was named BAMTech's CEO. On August 8, 2017, Disney announced that it would increase its ownership in the company to a 75% controlling stake for $1.58 billion. Disney also reiterated its plan to launch an ESPN-branded over-the-top service in early-2018 followed by a Disney-branded direct-to-consumer streaming service in 2019. BAMTech Media was placed under Kevin A. Mayer, Disney's senior executive vice president and chief strategy officer.

The company formally launched a website and corporate identity in September 2017. On November 7, 2017, BAMTech acquired the Manchester-based software firm Cake Solutions. As part of the corporate re-structuring, former director of Cake Solutions, Ian Brookes departed the company.

=== Disney Streaming Services (2018–2021) ===
Disney Streaming Services logo used 2018 to 2021

In Disney's March 14, 2018, segment reorganization in anticipation of integrating Fox assets, BAMTech was transferred to Walt Disney Direct-to-Consumer & International. BAMTech named Kevin Swint as senior vice-president and general manager of the Disney forthcoming streaming service in January 2018 with Agnes Chu as programming executive.

In October 2018, it was reported that the company had been internally renamed Disney Streaming Services. On October 31, 2018, ESPN International executive vice-president and managing director Russell Wolff was named executive vice-president and general manager of ESPN+. WWE did not renew its contract with BAMTech when it expired at the end of 2018, and signed a deal with Endeavor Streaming in January 2019.

=== Disney Streaming (2021–present) ===
On August 3, 2021, Disney announced on Twitter that the company was renamed as Disney Streaming. In the same month, it was reported that Disney was purchasing the NHL's 10% ownership stake in Disney Streaming Services for $350 million, giving Disney a 85% ownership stake and that Major League Baseball's 15% stake in the company could be purchased by Disney, as soon as 2022.

On August 10, 2022, it was reported that Disney Streaming had a total of 221 million subscriptions from Disney+, Hulu and ESPN+ combined. At the time, this number surpassed Netflix, which reported having 220.7 million subscribers as of July 2022. On November 29, 2022, Disney revealed in their annual report that they had acquired MLB's remaining 15% stake in the company for $900 million.

In October 2024, Disney announced a partnership with grocery chain Kroger to offer annual subscribers to its Boost service a subscription to Disney+, Hulu, or ESPN+ at no additional charge. The Hollywood Reporter noted that the agreement, as well as similar agreements between competing streaming services and food delivery services announced shortly afterward (Max and DashPass, and Peacock and Instacart+), were attempts to emulate the adoption of Prime Video induced by its inclusion in the wider Amazon Prime subscription.
