= Disney Television Studios =

Television studios arm of Disney

- Type: Subsidiary
- Industry: Television
- Predecessor: Walt Disney Television (first and second incarnations)
- Founded: May 15, 2019; 7 years ago
- Headquarters: Walt Disney Studios, Burbank, California, United States
- Key people: Craig Erwich (president)
- Services: Television production
- Parent: Disney Entertainment Television
- Divisions: 20th Television; 20th Television Animation
- Subsidiaries: Walt Disney Television Alternative
- Website: debut.disney.com/fyc/dts/

Disney Television Studios is the television studios arm of the Disney Entertainment division of the Walt Disney Company established on May 15, 2019 to succeed the first and second incarnations of Walt Disney Television following Disney's acquisition of 21st Century Fox.

The division oversees Disney's television studio assets including 20th Television, 20th Television Animation and the Walt Disney Television Alternative unit.

== Assets ==
=== Current ===
- 20th Television
  - 20th Television Animation
  - Regency Television International (50%)
- Walt Disney Television Alternative

=== Former ===
- The original 20th Television — merged into Disney–ABC Domestic Television
- ABC Signature — dissolved, operations folded into 20th Television
- ABC Signature Studios (2013–2020) — merged with ABC Studios to form ABC Signature
- ABC Studios (2007–2020) — originally Touchstone Television (first incarnation) (1985–2007), merged with ABC Signature Studios to form ABC Signature
- Touchstone Television (2014–2020) (second incarnation) — originally Fox Television Studios (1997–2014), Fox 21 (2004–2014) and Fox 21 Television Studios (2014–2020), folded into 20th Television

== Filmography ==
- List of programs produced by ABC Signature
- List of 20th Television programs
- List of 20th Television Animation productions
