= ABC Owned Television Stations =

Television stations arm of ABC

- Formerly: ABC Television Spot Sales; CC/ABC Broadcasting Group
- Type: Division
- Industry: TV broadcasting
- Founded: 1948; 78 years ago
- Headquarters: Glendale, California, United States
- Number of locations: 8
- Key people: Chad Matthews (president)
- Parent: Disney Entertainment Television
- Divisions: Localish
- Website: abcotvpress.com

ABC Owned Television Stations (formerly CC/ABC Broadcasting Group and ABC Television Spot Sales) is a sub-division of the Disney Entertainment Television division of the Disney Entertainment business segment of the Walt Disney Company that oversees the owned-and-operated stations of the American Broadcasting Company (ABC) and operates the Localish network.

== History ==
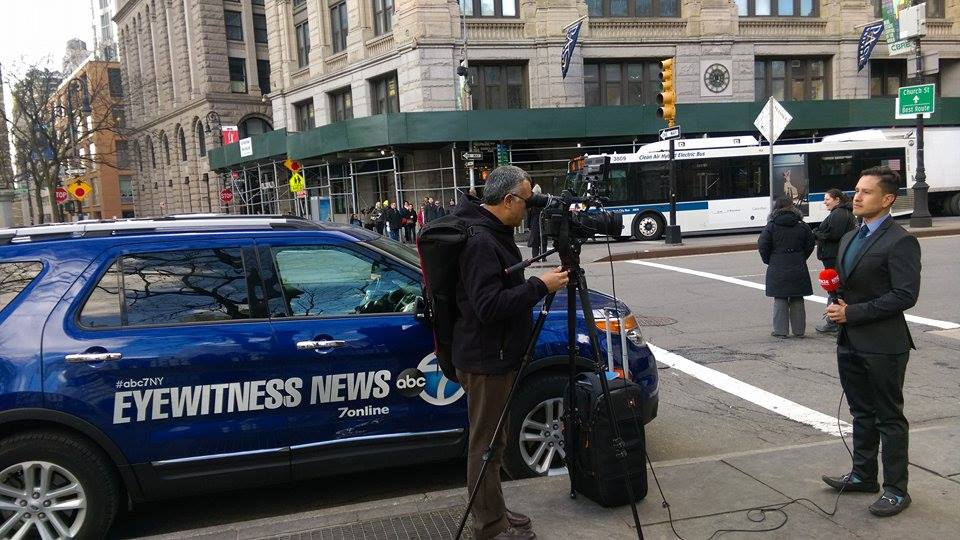
A news crew for WABC in New York City

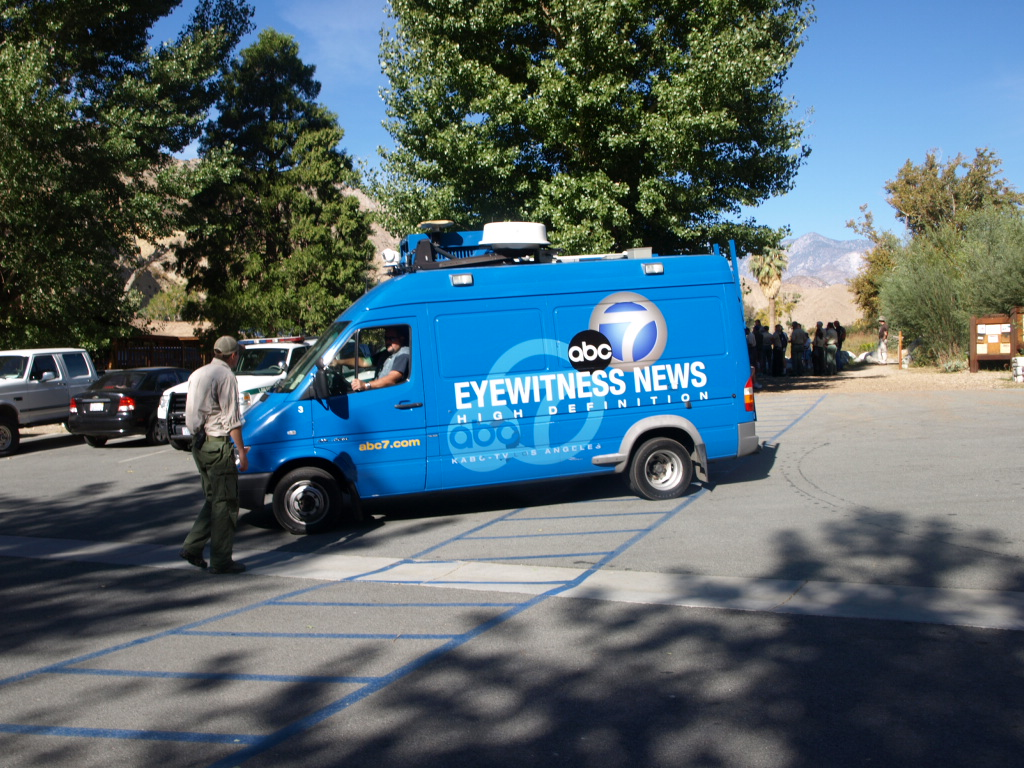
A news van for KABC in Los Angeles

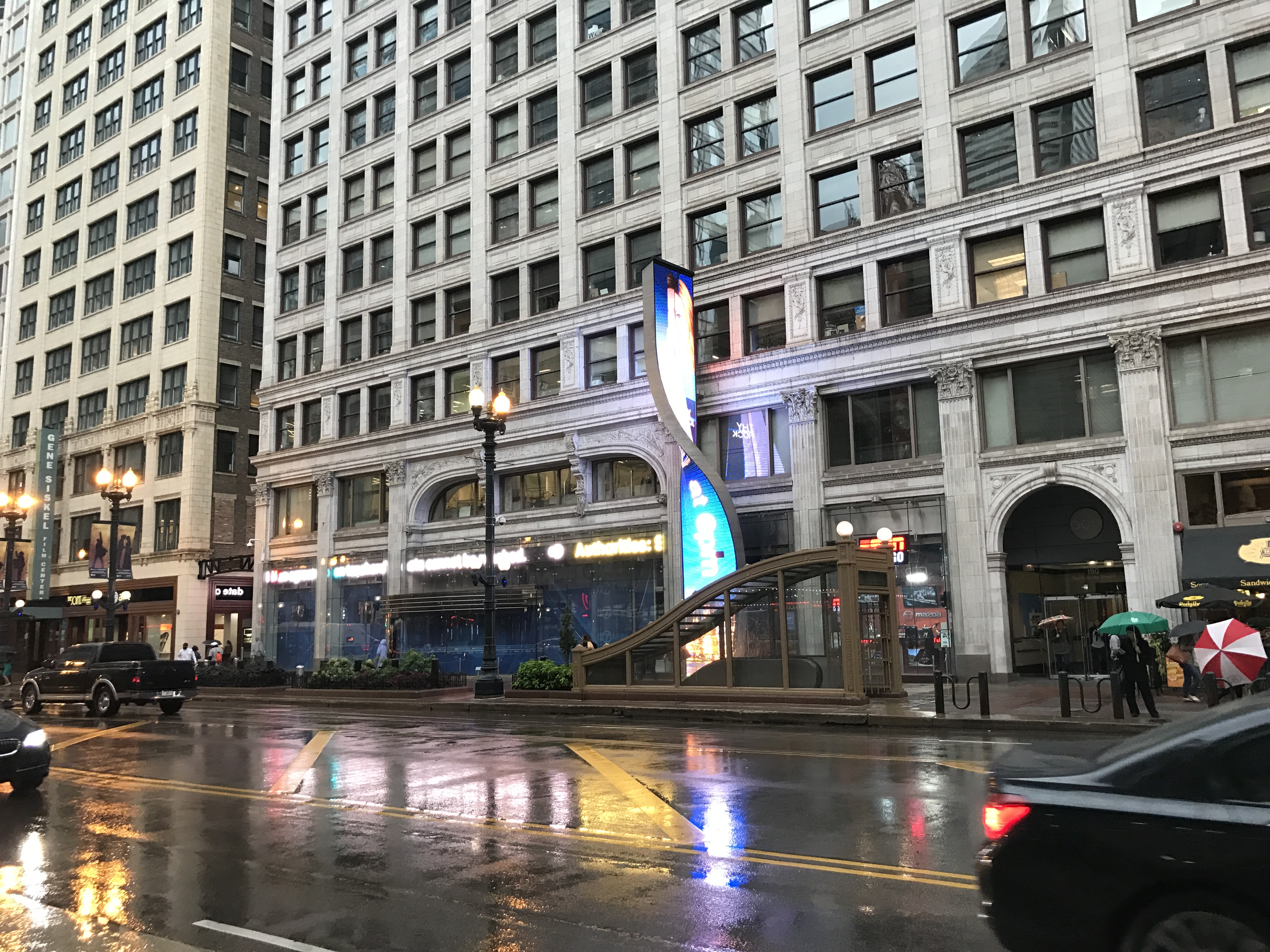
The WLS studio building in Chicago

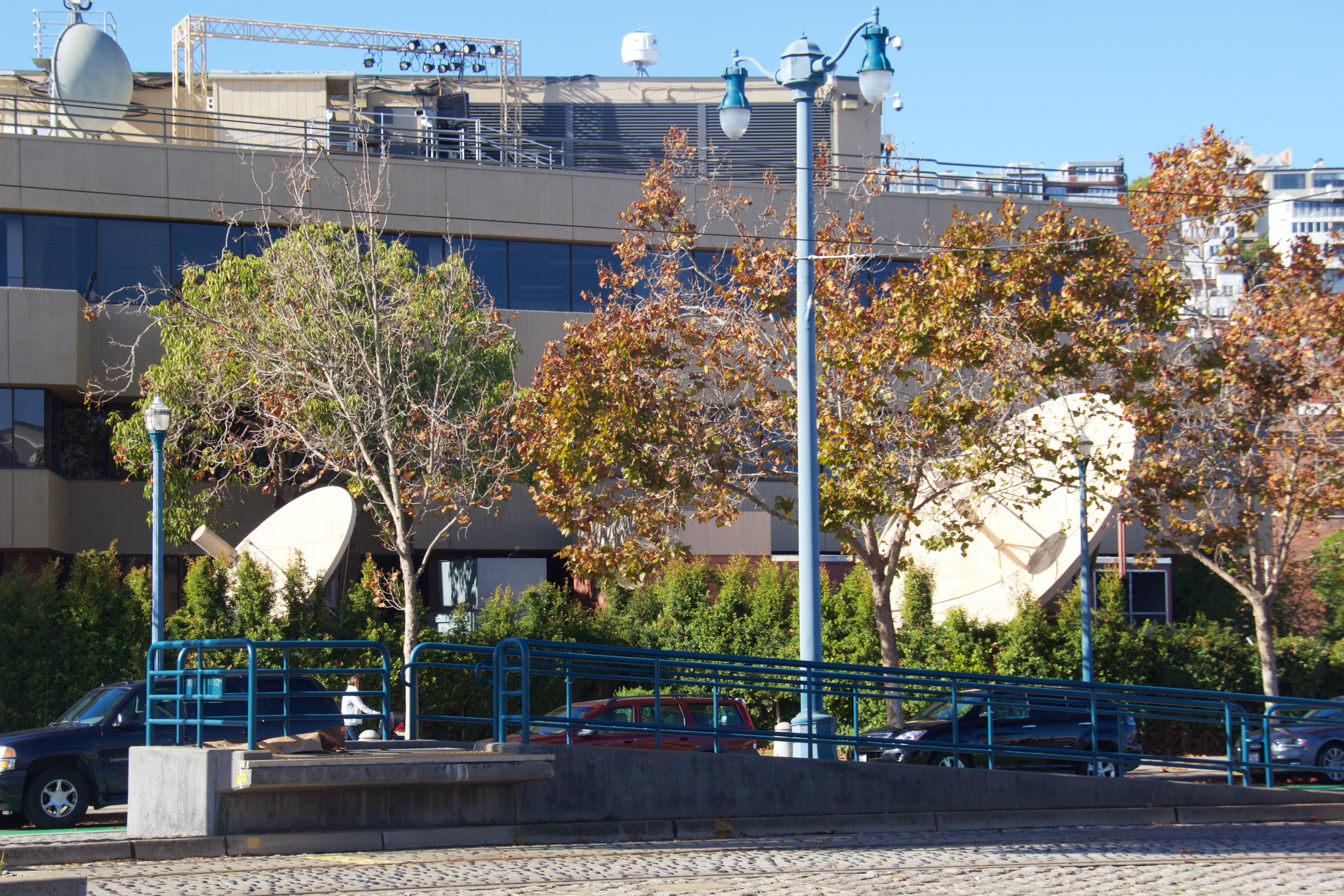
Antennas outside the KGO studio building in San Francisco

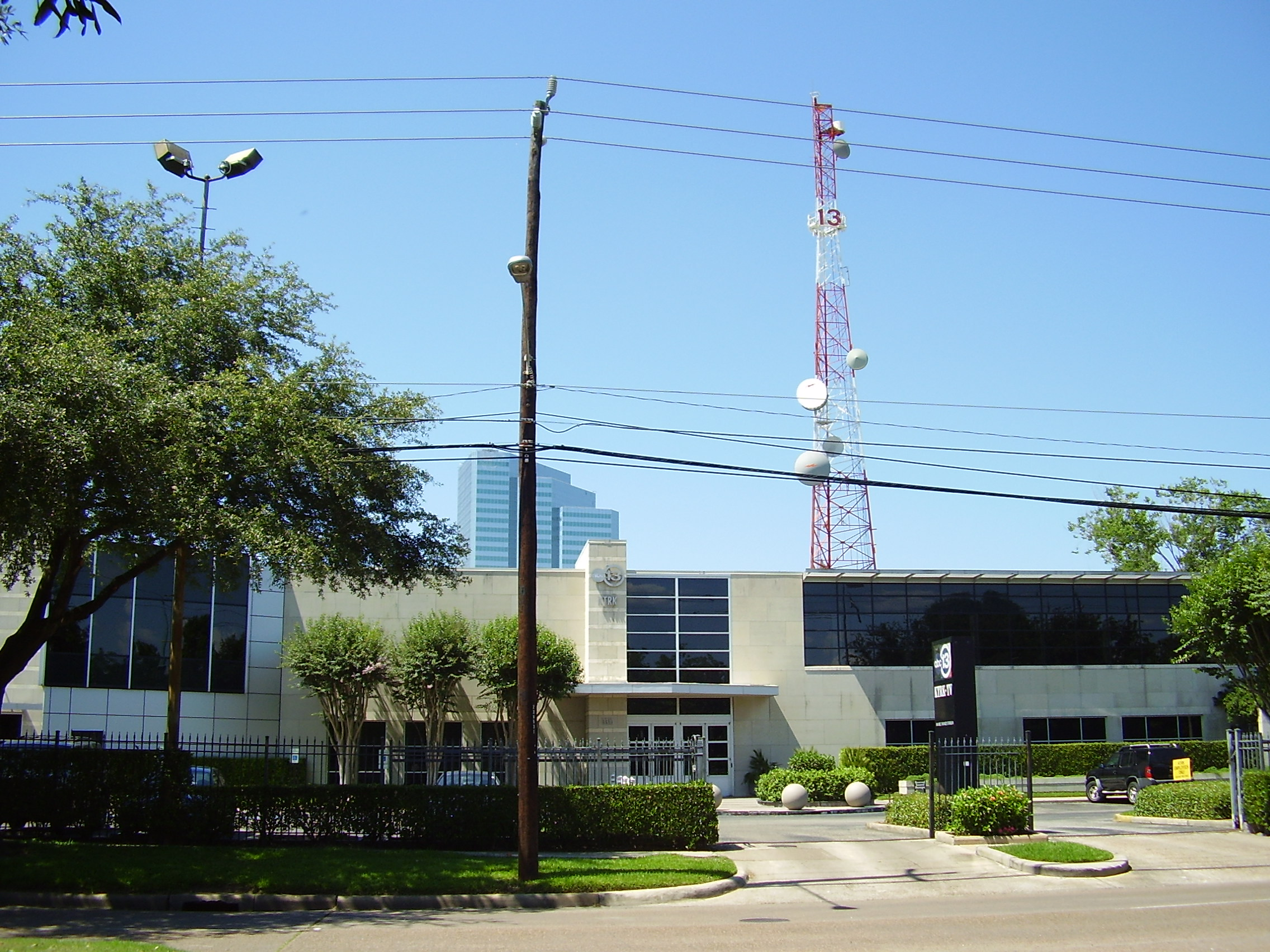
The KTRK studio building in Houston

=== ABC Network ===
The American Broadcasting Company's first TV station signed on August 10, 1948, as WJZ-TV (not to be confused with current CBS-owned WJZ-TV Baltimore), the first of three television stations signed on by ABC during that same year, with WENR-TV in Chicago and WXYZ-TV in Detroit being the other two. KGO-TV in San Francisco and KECA in Los Angeles, signed on during the next 13 months after WJZ.

In February 1953, ABC merged with United Paramount Theatres (UPT), the former theater division of Paramount Pictures. UPT subsidiary Balaban and Katz owned WBKB (which shared a CBS affiliation with WGN-TV). The newly merged American Broadcasting-Paramount Theatres, as the company was known then, could not keep both stations because of Federal Communications Commission (FCC) regulations then enforced that forbade the common ownership of two television stations licensed to the same market. As a result, WBKB's channel 4 license was sold to CBS, which subsequently changed that station's call letters to WBBM-TV; that outlet would move to VHF channel 2 several months later on July 5, 1953. The old WBKB's on-air and behind-the-scenes staff stayed at the new WBBM-TV, while the WBKB call letters and management moved to channel 7 (from 1965 to 1968, a "-TV" suffix was included in the station's calls, modifying it to WBKB-TV).

=== Capital Cities/ABC ===
On March 19, 1985, Capital Cities announced that it would purchase ABC for $3.5 billion, which shocked the media industry, as ABC was some four times bigger than Capital Cities was at the time.

The newly merged company, Capital Cities/ABC Inc., was forced to sell off some stations due to FCC ownership rules. Between them, ABC and Capital Cities owned more television stations than FCC rules allowed at the time. Of the former Capital Cities television stations, the merged company opted to keep KTRK-TV in Houston, WTVD-TV in Durham, and KFSN-TV in Fresno. FCC rules could have also forced a sale of Capital Cities' WPVI-TV in Philadelphia as well due to a large signal overlap with WABC-TV, but the merged company successfully received a permanent waiver from the FCC after citing CBS' ownership of television stations in New York City (WCBS-TV) and Philadelphia (at the time WCAU-TV) under grandfathered status. Capital Cities' WFTS-TV in Tampa and ABC's WXYZ-TV in Detroit were divested as a pair to the E. W. Scripps Company's broadcasting division (then known as Scripps-Howard Broadcasting). Capital Cities' WTNH-TV in New Haven and WKBW-TV in Buffalo were sold separately to minority-owned companies (Scripps would eventually buy WKBW in 2014).

In 1994, New World Communications signed an affiliation deal with Fox Broadcasting Company, resulting in most of New World's stations switching affiliation to Fox. This set off the 1994–1996 United States broadcast television realignment, a chain of affiliation changes across the country and other multi-station affiliation deals for the next couple of years. To avoid being consigned to the lower-signal-quality UHF after losing its affiliations to New World's WJBK in Detroit and WJW-TV in Cleveland, CBS heavily wooed both E. W. Scripps Company's WXYZ-TV and WEWS-TV. Scripps then told ABC that unless it agreed to affiliate with the other Scripps-owned stations, it would switch both Detroit and Cleveland stations to CBS. A fourth Scripps station was included in a separate deal, that of the Cincinnati station in 1995. As a contingency, ABC bought WJRT-TV in Flint, Michigan and WTVG in Toledo, Ohio from SJL Broadcasting in 1995. ABC also had a partner deal with Allbritton Communications to convert most of these affiliates to ABC, also in 1996. In response of the deal stemming from NBC's trade of KCNC and KUTV, in 1994, ABC also had a group deal with McGraw Hill to convert the Denver and Bakersfield stations from CBS to ABC, while renewing affiliation agreements in San Diego and Indianapolis.

=== Disney/ABC division ===
The ABC Owned TV Stations (ABCOTS) were paired with ABC Radio Network and eight TV stations in CC/ABC Broadcasting Group in Capital Cities/ABC (CC/ABC) when CC/ABC was purchased by The Walt Disney Company in 1996. In June, ABC's top marketing officer announced that the owned-and-operated (O&O) stations would adopt a "one-channel" marketing strategy; the stations would, for promotional purposes, de-emphasize referring to themselves by their call letters, and instead refer to themselves using "ABC" and the station's channel number ("ABC Seven", for example), as the marketer had adopted this practice at NBC before.

In June 1998, ABC parent The Walt Disney Company entered into negotiations to purchase the eight Allbritton stations and its local marketing agreements involving fellow ABC affiliates WJSU-TV (now WGWW) in Anniston, Alabama and WJXX in Jacksonville, Florida, for a reported offer totaling more than $1 billion; the latter two stations had been involved in an affiliation deal between Allbritton and ABC that was reached in response to the May 1994 affiliation deal between New World Communications and Fox that affected WBRC in Birmingham, Alabama. Negotiations between Disney and Allbritton broke down when the former dropped out of discussions to buy the stations the following month.

ABC News Now was launched in 2004 in the US on digital subchannels of 70 ABC O&O stations and affiliates. On January 31, 2005, ABC News removed ABC News Now from owned and operated and affiliated TV stations' subchannel as the channel ended its experimental phase originally. The group changed its programming on secondary channels to ABC Plus, a local news and public affairs format. ABC teamed up with AccuWeather to launch a multicast service starting on ABC stations' third subchannel beginning with WPVI-TV in September 2005 followed by KFSN-TV with the next wave of four by December 31, 2005, then the final four by March 31, 2006. The Live Well Network (LWN) was launched on April 27, 2009, in high definition by ABC's O&O stations on the stations'.2 subchannels.

On November 3, 2010, Broadcasting & Cable magazine announced that SJL Broadcasting, now owned by the principal owners of Lilly Broadcasting, made an agreement with Disney to buy back WJRT-TV and WTVG, the two smallest stations in ABC's O&O portfolio. The sale was completed on April 1, 2011. On October 17, 2013, the New York Post reported that Disney considered selling the station group given the current wave of consolidation between station holding companies that has increased station values since 2010. On October 25, the Triangle Business Journal reported that multiple Disney spokespeople denied that information

On June 9, 2014, ABC Owned Television Stations vice president Peggy Allen and president Rebecca Campbell jointly announced to Live Well Network's staff that they planned to shut down the network in January 2015. Campbell and Allen stated that despite the success of the network, the division wanted to prioritize "local content" and its "core local news brands". Many of the shows from ABC's stations ended production with a possibility to be picked up by the FYI cable network, a DATG partially owned A&E Networks cable channel. On January 15, 2015, ABCOTS announced a pickup of Laff, a new subchannel owned by E. W. Scripps Company subsidiary Katz Broadcasting. Laff was added to the DT3 subchannels of the ABC O&O stations effective on April 15, 2015; within that announcement, ABCOTS stated that Live Well Network would continue on their eight stations on their .2 subchannels in HD, but no longer be distributed outside of ABC O&O stations. ABCOTS also indicated that its stations' 3rd subchannel would affiliate with Laff network upon launch on April 15, 2015, but until then LWN would run on both subchannels.

Campbell, president of ABC Daytime and ABC Owned Television Stations, was named President of Disney EMEA in September 2017. Wendy McMahon, the stations' senior VP of digital, was named station group president effective January 1, 2018.

ABC Owned Television Stations launched its Localish digital media venture the week of September 20, 2018, with four shows. Localish focuses on mobile millennials with national appeal local short stories produced by the stations and released on digital and social platforms. The first series, More in Common, had already appeared via Facebook Watch. A More in Common compilation special was broadcast on all ABC station's primary channels on November 4, 2018, with WPVI-TV (Philadelphia) also on November 3 then on their LiveWell Network subchannel (.2) from November 4 through 11, 2018. On January 21, 2020, ABC Stations announced that the network would be rebranded as the Localish on February 17, 2020.

At the beginning of 2021, Laff was removed from the ABC Owned Television Stations (excluding WLS-TV, which had removed Laff in 2017) and moved to Ion Media stations which were acquired by Scripps around the same time. Later in April, Allen Media Group announced that the ABC Owned Television Stations had picked up This TV as a replacement for Laff. Then three years later, ABC Owned Television Stations announced that Charge!, a network owned by Sinclair Broadcast Group, would replace This TV effective April 1, 2024.

== Stations ==
Stations are arranged in alphabetical order by state and city of license.

- (**) – Indicates station was built and signed on by ABC.

=== Current ===
List of stations currently owned by ABC
| Media market | State | Station | Channel | Year of affiliation | Purchased | Digital subchannels |
|---|---|---|---|---|---|---|
| Fresno | California | KFSN-TV | 30 | 1985 | 1986 | Localish; Charge!; HSN |
| Los Angeles | California | KABC-TV ** | 7 | 1949 | | Localish; Charge!; QVC2 |
| San Francisco–Oakland–San Jose | California | KGO-TV ** | 7 | 1949 | | Localish; Charge!; HSN |
| Chicago | Illinois | WLS-TV ** | 7 | 1948 | | Localish; Charge! |
| New York | New York | WABC-TV ** | 7 | 1948 | | Localish; Charge!; HSN |
| Durham–Raleigh–Fayetteville | North Carolina | WTVD | 11 | 1985 (Note: Previously with ABC from 1954 to 1962.) | 1986 | Localish; Charge!; HSN |
| Philadelphia | Pennsylvania | WPVI-TV | 6 | 1948 (Note: Oldest continuous ABC affiliate.) | 1986 | Localish; Charge!; QVC |
| Houston | Texas | KTRK-TV | 13 | 1954 | 1986 | Localish; Charge!; QVC |

=== Former ===
| Media market | State | Station | Channel | Purchased | Sold |
|---|---|---|---|---|---|
| Detroit | Michigan | WXYZ-TV ** | 7 | 1948 | 1986 |
| Flint–Saginaw | Michigan | WJRT-TV | 12 | 1995 | 2011 |
| Toledo | Ohio | WTVG | 13 | 1995 | 2011 |

== Programming ==
ABC's owned and operated stations' syndicated offerings (as of April 2023) include The Tamron Hall Show, Live with Kelly and Mark, Wheel of Fortune, Jeopardy!, and Small Town Big Deal. Live is produced in-house at WABC-TV. Wheel and Jeopardy! have been syndicated to ABC-owned stations since 1992, as part of a longstanding relationship with what is now CBS Media Ventures dating to when the syndicator was still known as King World Productions.

Overnights, ABC's owned and operated stations air rebroadcasts of Tamron Hall, ABC World News Tonight, and Live with Kelly and Mark. Every ABC owned station, except for WPVI and KABC, airs Daytime Jeopardy!, a repeat broadcast given to most of its affiliates during the daytime. Since 2026, rebroadcasts of ABC World News Tonight have followed Nightline on all of the O&Os.

On weekends, the stations air repeat broadcasts of The Rookie, 9-1-1, Jeopardy! and Wheel of Fortune as well as programming from Localish. KTRK, however, doesn't air Wheel as Houston is one of the few markets where the program airs on a different station than Jeopardy!.
