= Kareem Daniel =

Walt Disney Company executive from 2020 to 2022

- Born: 1974 (age 51–52); Chicago, Illinois
- Education: Stanford University (BS); Stanford Graduate School of Business (MBA)
- Occupation: American business executive
- Employer: The Walt Disney Company (2006–2022)
- Title: Chairman, Disney Media and Entertainment Distribution (2020–2022)
- Board member of: McDonald's

Kareem Daniel is an American businessman and former media executive at The Walt Disney Company. During his tenure at Disney, he held executive roles in charge of film and television, sports, streaming, theme parks, and consumer products. Prior to Disney, Daniel worked in equity research and investment banking at Goldman Sachs, having begun his career as an electrical engineer. He is also on the board of directors for McDonald's.

== Early life and education ==
Kareem Daniel grew up in Chicago. He attended Morgan Park Academy and went on to earn both a Bachelor of Science degree in electrical engineering and an MBA from Stanford University.

== Career ==
After working as a computer programmer during the dot-com boom, Daniel enrolled in business school. His interest in film led him to pursue a career in the entertainment industry, and he interned at The Walt Disney Company while in business school. Upon graduation, he took a full-time position at Disney. He then worked in equity research and investment banking at Goldman Sachs from 2004 to 2007.

After returning to Disney in 2007, he held executive roles in Disney Corporate Strategy, Walt Disney Studios, and Disney Consumer Products and Interactive Media. He played a key role in various business initiatives, as well as mergers and acquisitions like the 2009 acquisition of Marvel, and the 2012 Lucasfilm acquisition.

In 2017, Daniel moved to Walt Disney Imagineering. In 2019, he was promoted to President of Operations, where he was responsible for the design and development of Disney's parks, attractions, resorts and cruises. During his tenure, areas like Star Wars: Galaxy's Edge, Toy Story Land, Pixar Pier, Avengers Campus and other themed areas were introduced or expanded.

In May 2020, Daniel was named President of Consumer Products, Gaming and Publishing, including the world's largest consumer licensing business, the Disney Store, and Disney's e-commerce shopDisney and videogame business.

In October 2020, Kareem Daniel was promoted to Chairman of Disney Media & Entertainment Distribution (DMED), a new division created to oversee Disney's media businesses. The division combined the company's film, television, streaming, and advertising businesses under his leadership.

He managed Disney's advertising and traditional media businesses, including theatrical releases, home entertainment, and television networks such as ESPN, ABC, FX and National Geographic. Daniel was tasked with growing Disney's streaming platforms, including Disney+, Hulu, ESPN+ and Star+. On November 14, 2021 Daniel inaugurated Disney+ Day, a virtual event intended to promote Disney's streaming services. In August 2022, Disney's streaming platforms had 221 million subscribers. By November 2022, the number of total subscriptions had reached 235 million, exceeding those of rival streaming platform Netflix. Under Daniel, Disney generated $55 billion in revenue from media and entertainment during the 2022 fiscal year.

In October 2022, Daniel was elected to McDonald's board of directors. He exited his role at Walt Disney in November 2022, during the return of Disney CEO Bob Iger.

In December 2023, Daniel was elected to the Simon & Schuster's board of directors.

== Reception ==
Daniel's role within Disney made him one of the most influential media executives, and the most senior Black executive, in Hollywood. Several media publications dubbed him the "czar" of Disney's streaming business, and was ranked among "the 10 most powerful people in Hollywood" in 2023. In 2020 and 2021, Daniel was included on Variety's list of the 500 most influential leaders in global media. He was a keynote speaker at Variety's entertainment and technology summit in 2022.
