= 80 Million Strong (for Young American Jobs) =

Youth employment advocacy coalition

80 Million Strong (for Young American Jobs) was a coalition aiming to unite young Americans to own and direct their economic reality. The summit, taking place July 14–15, 2009 in Washington, D.C., looked at the problems that young people face in order to find constructive, long-term solutions. Stakeholders convened, proposing legislation that creates new jobs for the new economy.

Steps to doing this:

1. Convening a summit of young people in Washington, DC to discuss this problem and propose solutions
2. Developing federal legislation based on the summit's recommendations
3. Building a grassroots coalition that truly reflects and empowers the Millennial generation

The coalition was disbanded in August 2009 after four months of operation.

== Coalition ==
- Mobilize.org
- Roosevelt Institution
- Student Association for Voter Empowerment
- United States Student Association
- Generation Engage
- ServeNext
- Young People For
- Advocates for Youth
- Future Majority
- Campus Camp Wellstone
- The League of Young Voters
- Campus Progress
- Hip Hop Caucus
- Declare Yourself
- Concord Coalition
- Voto Latino
- HeadCount
- Pike County Youth Coalition
- The Nation
- Rock The Vote
- Earth Aid
- National Network for Youth
- George Washington University's Graduate School of Political Management
- ChangeUpMag.com
- George Washington University's Semester in Washington Politics
- Young People First

== Background ==
- Youth unemployment is nearly 8% higher than the national average, with a 17.3% unemployment rate for those 16–24, according to the Bureau of Labor Statistics’ May data.
- Statistics indicate that people ages 16–24 represent one-third of the unemployed, even though they make up 15 percent of the nation's work force.
- African Americans and Hispanics are even more adversely affected by the crisis, with unemployment rates among 16- to 19-year-olds eclipsing 30%.
- Young people amass over $2000 in credit card debt by the age of 24.
- African American 20- to 24-year-olds are unemployed at a rate of 25.1
- Additionally, 30% of young people are uninsured, the highest of any age group.
- Despite common myths, the most common reason that young people do not hold insurance is because s/he cannot afford it and/or does not have access via an employer-sponsored plan.
