= René Rechtman =

Danish entrepreneur (born 1969/1970)

- Born: 1969 or 1970 (age 55–56)
- Education: University of Copenhagen
- Occupations: Entrepreneur, businessman, investor; Co-founder and CEO of Moonbug Entertainment
- Board member of: JP/Politikens Hus; Guardian Media Group
- Children: 3

René Rechtman (born 1969 or 1970) is a Danish entrepreneur, businessman, and investor. He is the founder and CEO of Moonbug Entertainment and former president of international operations at Maker Studios (now part of the Walt Disney Company).

== Education ==
Rechtman has a master’s degree in Political Science and International Relations from the University of Copenhagen.

== Career ==
In 2000, Rechtman joined Tradedoubler, an internet advertising firm, and established the firm in Denmark. In 2004 he was called to return to the London offices and was named director of advertising. In 2005, Tradedoubler went public and was listed on the Stockholm Stock Exchange. In 2008, Rechtman became director and co-owner of GoViral, a Danish startup distribution platform for video advertising. He sold the company in 2011 to American AOL for approximately $100 million. He remained on as CEO of AOL BeOn, the global branded content division of AOL Networks, and also served as senior vice president of AOL International. He served as the president of international operations and was an investor at Maker Studios (which would become Disney Digital Network) in 2014. That same year, the company was acquired by Disney for $500 million and he became head of "non-linear media". In 2016, he co-founded RFRSH Entertainment, a Danish esports entertainment platform, with Nikolaj Nyholm and Jakob Lund Kristensen.

In 2018, Rechtman left Disney and founded Moonbug Entertainment, a children’s entertainment company, with John Robson. The company's most famous series is Cocomelon, with one and a half billion plays on Youtube in one month. He sold the company in November 2021 for $3 billion to two former Disney executives, Kevin Mayer and Tom Staggs, and their Blackstone-backed media company, which was later named Candle Media in January 2022. He serves on the board of JP/Politikens Hus and Guardian Media Group. In 2011 and 2012, Rechtman was named in Wired Europe's Top 100 most influential list.

== Personal life ==
Rechtman was born from a Jewish family in Copenhagen, Denmark. He lives in London with his wife and three children.
