= Cocomelon Lane =

American-Canadian-British children's educational television series

- Genre: Children's music; Nursery rhymes
- Based on: Cocomelon
- Developed by: Guy Toubes; Brandon Violette
- Written by: Nida Chowdhry; Cameron Hope
- Directed by: Clint Butler; Mauro Casalese; Terry Izumi (seasons 1, 3–6); Mike Dowding (seasons 1–2, 4–7)
- Voices of: Cruze McKinnon; Denzel Onaba; Diana Tsoy; Samantha Alarcon; Kaiyus Tiwana Grewal; Sebastian Billingsley-Rodriguez; Dawson Littman; Mela Pietropaolo; Larissa Dias
- Opening theme: "It's a Great Day on Cocomelon Lane" by Cocomelon
- Ending theme: "It's a Great Day on Cocomelon Lane" (instrumental)
- Countries of origin: United States; Canada; United Kingdom
- Original language: English
- No. of seasons: 7
- No. of episodes: 28 (75 segments) (list of episodes)

Production
- Executive producers: Guy Toubes; Rene Rechtman; John Robson; Richard Hickey; Nellie McQuinn; Andy Yeatman; David Levine
- Producers: Kendra Haaland; Charlotte Loynes
- Production locations: 708 Sound Studio, Vancouver, British Columbia; Wanted! Post-Production Inc., Toronto, Ontario
- Editor: Brandon Violette
- Running time: 25–33 minutes (7 minutes per segment); 60 minutes (Cocomelon Lane specials)
- Production companies: Atomic Cartoons; Infinite Studios; Moonbug Entertainment

Original release
- Network: Netflix
- Release: November 13, 2023 – present

Related
- Cocomelon

Cocomelon Lane is an animated children's musical streaming television series, based on Cocomelon. A production of Moonbug Entertainment, along with Atomic Cartoons and Infinite Studios, the show premiered on Netflix on November 13, 2023. Cocomelon Lane was described as "a more traditional preschool TV version" of the YouTube Kids channel, narrative- rather than singalong-driven."

It was built around a "'social-emotional learning curriculum" that focuses on milestone moments for preschoolers, and the accompanying feelings. The series allowed Cocomelon characters to speak directly to the audience for the first time.

== Premise ==
JJ and his friends experience life's milestones, such as getting a haircut, visiting the dentist's office, being invited to a friend's house for dinner, and learning how to take care of a pet.

== Overview ==
Season	Segments	Episodes	Originally released
1	28	9	November 17, 2023
2	15	5	April 22, 2024
3	N/A	1	August 19, 2024
4	9	3	March 17, 2025
5	8	4	August 18, 2025
6	4	2	December 1, 2025
7	10	4	April 20, 2026

== Production ==
=== Animation ===
Deadline Hollywood announced on July 13, 2021, that Netflix has ordered Cocomelon Lane to series, and Cocomelon Lane is a production of Moonbug Entertainment, along with Atomic Cartoons and Infinite Studios. Cocomelon Lane aired on Netflix since November 17, 2023.

=== Music ===
The theme song for Cocomelon Lane is "It's a Great Day on Cocomelon Lane" by Cocomelon. "It's a Great Day on Cocomelon Lane" is sung by JJ in every Cocomelon Lane episode.

== Description ==
Every episode of Cocomelon Lane begins with JJ singing "Imagine with Me" with all the Melon Patch Academy kids as JJ uses his ladybug light toy to imagine and play pretend with all of our friends. After playing pretend, each character sings "About To Do Something New" as every character learns about ABCs, 123s, shapes, colors, animals, nursery rhymes, music, singing, etc. Once the song was finished at the end of every episode of Cocomelon Lane, each character discusses about the things they've learned and the stuff they've experienced in the episode.

== Release ==
=== Broadcast ===
The first season of Cocomelon Lane premiered on Netflix on November 17, 2023. The second season premiered on Netflix on April 22, 2024. The third season premiered on Netflix on August 19, 2024, with a nursery rhyme special titled "Cocomelon Lane: The Nursery Rhyme Musical". The fourth season premiered on March 17, 2025, followed by the fifth on August 18, 2025. The sixth season premiered on December 1, 2025, followed by the seventh on April 20, 2026.

=== Streaming ===
Every episode of Cocomelon Lane is currently available to stream on YouTube Kids and Netflix Jr. in the United States and Canada.

== See also ==
- Cocomelon
- Moonbug Entertainment
- List of Netflix original programming
