= Rasulo =

Rasulo is a surname. Notable people with the surname include:

- Giorgio Rasulo (born 1997), English footballer
- Jay Rasulo, American business executive
