= Thomas O. Staggs =

American business executive (born 1961)

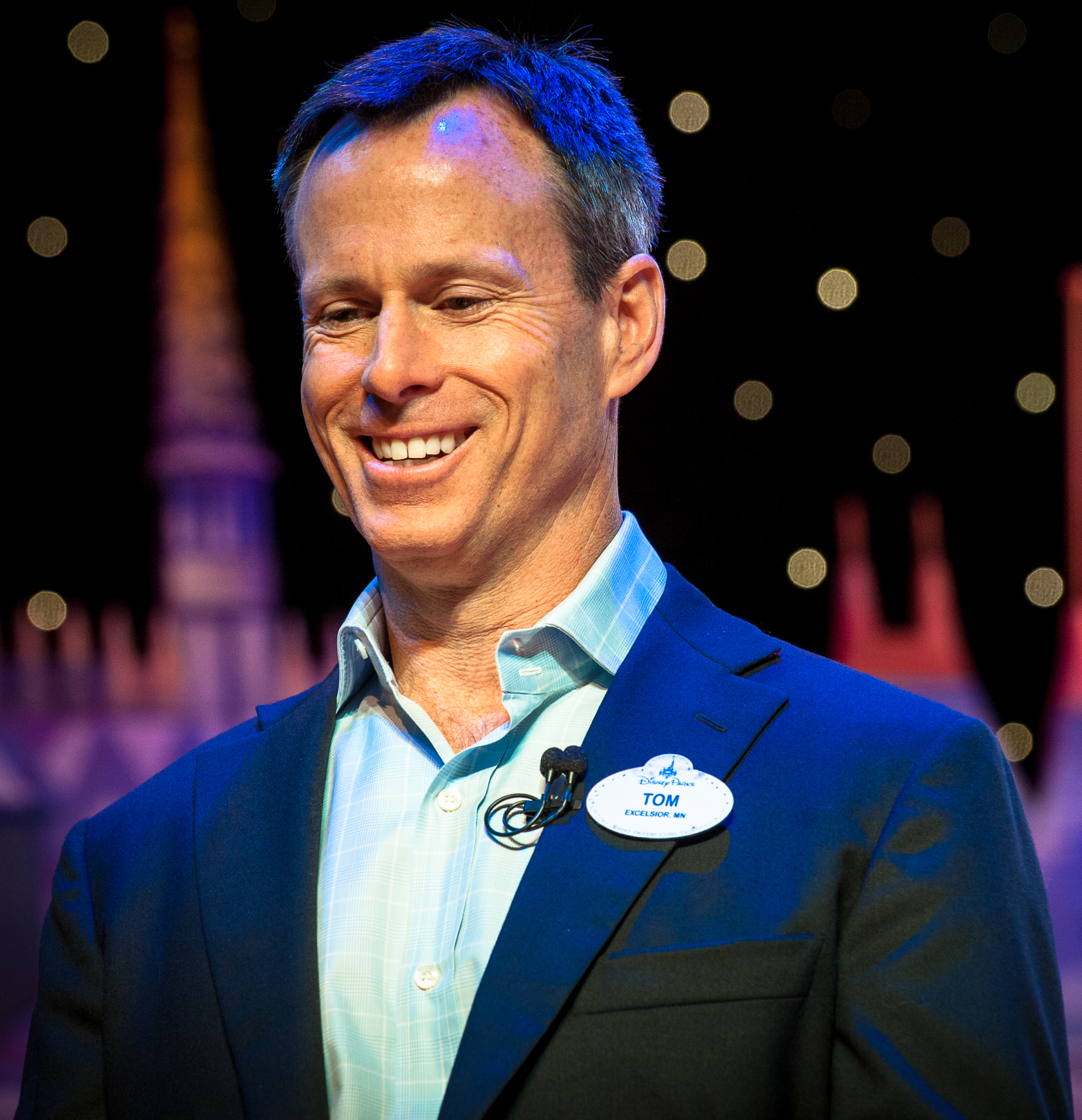
- Staggs in 2014

Former COO of The Walt Disney Company
- In office 5 February 2015 – 6 May 2016
- Preceded by: Bob Iger

Former CFO of The Walt Disney Company
- In office 1998 – 2010
- Preceded by: Richard Nanula
- Succeeded by: Jay Rasulo

Former Chairman of Disney Parks, Experiences and Products
- In office 1 January 2010 – 5 February 2015
- Succeeded by: Bob Chapek

Personal details
- Born: 1961 (age 64–65)
- Education: University of Minnesota (BS); Stanford University (MBA)

Thomas Owen Staggs (born 1961) is an American businessman. He is the co-founder and co-CEO of Candle Media as well as a partner at private equity firm Smash Capital. He worked at the Walt Disney Company for nearly 27 years. Beginning in 1990, he worked in finance, was later promoted to the chief financial officer, then to chairman of Walt Disney Parks and Resorts Worldwide, and finally to Disney's chief operating officer. Staggs also holds directorships on various company boards, including Spotify.

== Early life and education ==
Staggs was born in Illinois and grew up in Minnesota. He graduated from Minnetonka High School in 1978, and received a B.S. in business from the University of Minnesota and an MBA from the Stanford Graduate School of Business.

== Career ==
Staggs began his career as an investment banker, first for Dain Bosworth, and then for Morgan Stanley before joining Disney in 1990.

=== Disney ===
After joining Disney, Staggs rose from his role as a manager of strategic planning to senior vice president of strategic planning and development in 1995. Staggs became executive vice president and chief financial officer in 1998, and became Senior Executive Vice President and CFO in January 2000. As CFO, Staggs was instrumental in purchasing Pixar for $7.4 billion in 2006 as well as acquiring Marvel Entertainment for $4 billion in 2009.

On January 1, 2010, Staggs became Chairman of Walt Disney Parks and Resorts, where he "more than doubled operating profits, to $2.66 billion", while overseeing the company's roughly 140,000 cast members, theme parks, two cruise lines, and hotel and resort businesses. Staggs led the development of the MyMagic Plus technology suite and the creation of an Avatar theme land in Disney's Animal Kingdom park. Disney CEO Bob Iger credited Staggs with leading "unprecedented growth and expansion, including the construction of Shanghai Disney", its $5.5 billion resort.

On February 5, 2015, Staggs was named chief operating officer of The Walt Disney Company. Despite "Disney’s rocky history of succession", Staggs was widely reported to be heir apparent to Bob Iger as the Disney CEO. Disney decided to go in a different direction, and Bob Chapek succeeded Iger as CEO.

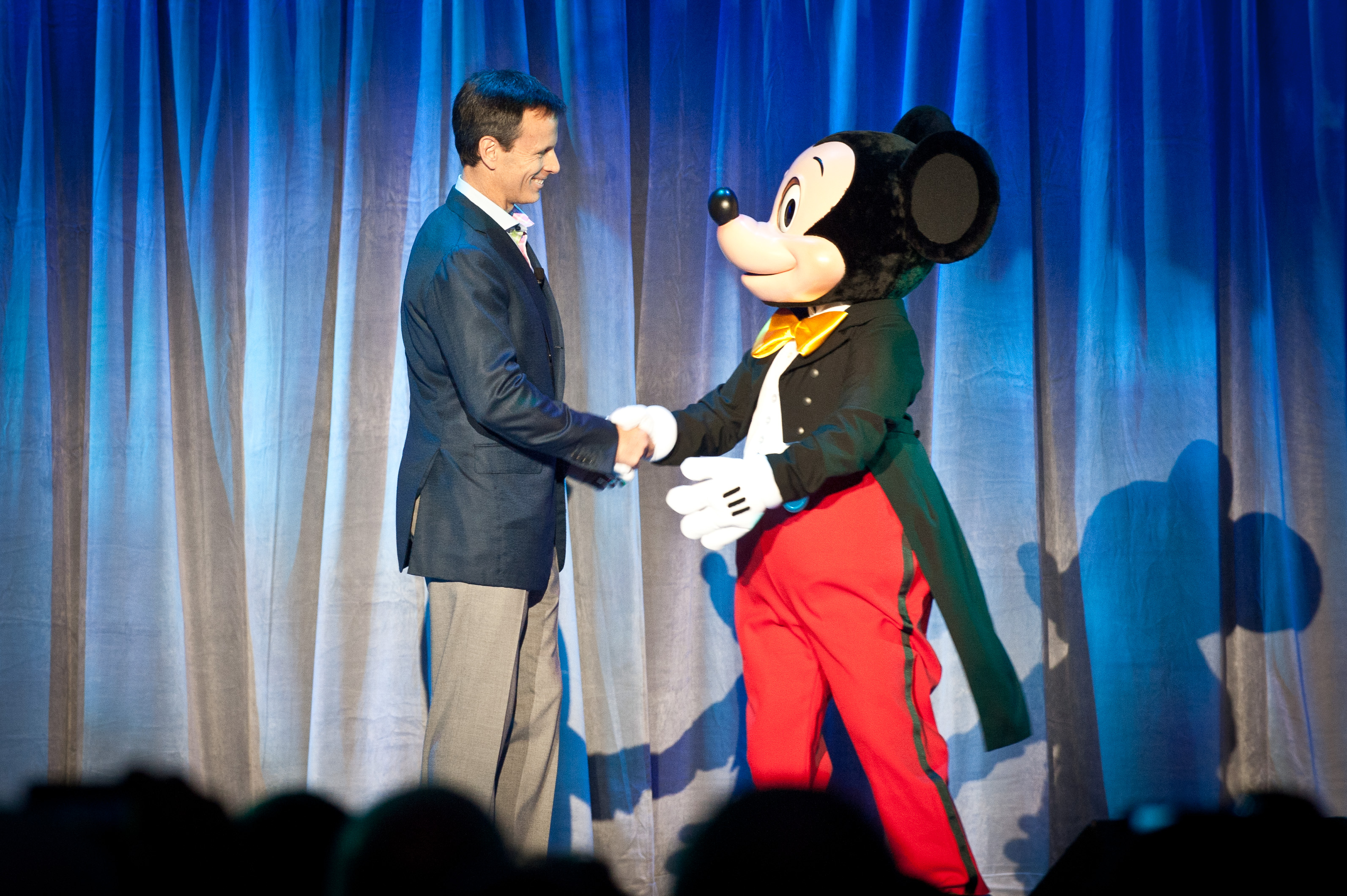
Thomas Staggs at Disney's D23 Expo in 2011

On April 4, 2016, Disney announced that Staggs and the company had agreed to mutually part ways. Staggs stepped down as COO, effective May 6, 2016, remaining with the company as a "Special Advisor to the CEO" Bob Iger through the end of the fiscal year. Iger extended his contract as Disney's chairman and CEO to remain chairman through 2021. Following his departure from Disney, and prior to its August 2019 merger with Viacom, Staggs was in consideration to succeed Les Moonves as CEO of CBS.

In July 2023, Staggs, along with fellow previous executive Kevin Mayer, returned to Disney in an advisory role at the request of CEO Bob Iger.

=== Forest Road ===
In October 2020, Staggs helped form special-purpose acquisition company (SPAC) Forest Road Acquisition Corp as a director, partnering with his former Disney colleague Kevin Mayer and the Forest Road Company (FRC), of which he is an original investor and advisory board member. Other board members and advisors of Forest Road Acquisition Corp include FRC founder Zachary Tarica, Shaquille O'Neal, Mark Burg, and Martin Luther King III. FRC is a "full-service provider" to the independent film industry, loaning funds against state film tax credits. FRC began public trading on November 25, 2020 (NYSE:FRX), and was reported that month to have raised more than $US300 million. In February 2021, an agreement for a three-way merger between Forest Road Acquisition Corp, Myx Fitness Holdings and Beachbody was entered into.

=== Candle Media ===
In 2021, Staggs and Kevin Mayer founded Candle Media, which was created from their previous SPAC. Candle Media has engaged in ten acquisitions, which includes Reese Witherspoon's company 'Hello Sunshine' and Moonbug Entertainment, which produces the popular children's television series Cocomelon.

=== Board memberships ===
Since leaving Disney, Staggs has been an active investor and advisor for various companies. He is also a member of the board of directors of Spotify
