= Christine McCarthy =

American businesswoman

- Born: 1955 or 1956 (age 69–70); United States
- Occupation: Business

The Walt Disney Company

CFO
- In office June 30, 2015 – June 30, 2023
- Preceded by: Jay Rasulo
- Succeeded by: Kevin Lansberry

Imperial Bancorp

CFO and executive vice president
- In office 1981–1996

Christine McCarthy (born 1955 or 1956) is an American businesswoman and the former chief financial officer (CFO) of The Walt Disney Company.

== Education ==
McCarthy graduated from Smith College with a bachelor's degree in biology. She also earned an MBA in marketing and management from the Anderson School of Management at UCLA.

== Career ==
Before joining Disney, McCarthy worked in the banking industry. From 1981 to 1996, McCarthy worked at First Interstate Bancorp in several finance and planning positions. She served as CFO and an executive vice president for Imperial Bancorp from 1997 to 2000.

In 2000, she became treasurer of Disney. On June 30, 2015, McCarthy was appointed as the CFO of The Walt Disney Company replacing Jay Rasulo under a four-year contract with a base salary of $1.25 million with a potential 200% performance based bonuses and 250% long term incentive award.

On December 21, 2021, Disney announced they had renewed McCarthy's contract as CFO through 2024. On June 15, 2023, Disney announced that McCarthy will be "stepping down from her CFO role" due to family concerns and named Kevin Lansberry as her interim replacement. McCarthy will stay on as a Strategic Advisor after stepping down as CFO on June 30."

She has been on the board of Procter & Gamble since 2019 and Flutter Entertainment since 2024.

=== Controversies ===
In 2021, she faced controversy when she suggested cutting food portion sizes at Disney's theme parks would benefit overweight Disney guests.

In 2022, the Disney board unexpectedly dismissed CEO Bob Chapek, replacing him with his predecessor Bob Iger on an interim basis. The Wall Street Journal reported that McCarthy played a key role in the dismissal by raising concerns with the board. News reports later identified her as a likely successor to Iger, though she later stepped down from the company.

== Philanthropy ==
McCarthy is a trustee for the Westridge School (Pasadena). She is also a mentor for the National Math and Science Initiative.

== Awards ==
In 2015, McCarthy received the Woman of the Year Award from Treasury Today.

Business positions
Unknown	Treasurer of Disney Co. 2000–2015	Succeeded by Jonathan S. Headley
Preceded by Jay Rasulo	CFO of Disney Co. 2015–2023	Succeeded by Kevin Lansberry
