= Voter registration campaign =

Effort to register persons to vote

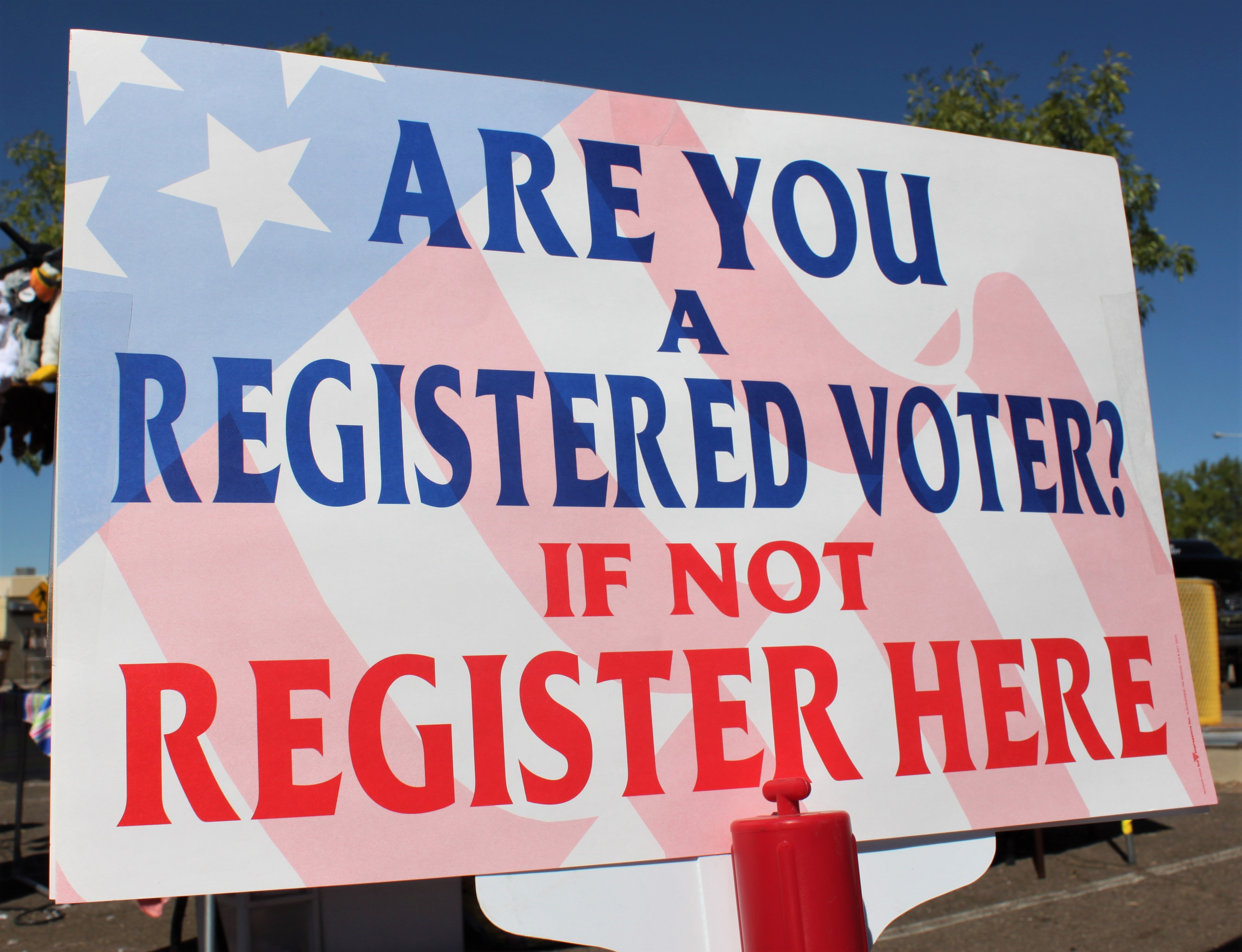
Sign advertising voter registration in Las Cruces, New Mexico (September 2009).

A voter registration campaign or voter registration drive is an effort by a government authority, political party or other entity to register to vote persons otherwise entitled to vote. In some countries, voter registration is automatic, and is carried out by the government, so there is no need for organized efforts to register voters. In many many jurisdictions, the functions of electoral authorities includes endeavours to get as many people to register to vote as possible. In most jurisdictions, registration is a prerequisite to a person being able to vote at an election.

A 2014 study indicated that voter registration drives increase the number of voters; however, changes to the socioeconomic composition of the effective voter base may be limited: while relatively poor areas had higher rates of registration, this was countered by a higher turnout among the newly registered voters in affluent areas.

== United Kingdom ==
In the United Kingdom, voter registration was introduced for all constituencies as a result of the Reform Act 1832, which took effect for the election of the same year. Since 1832, only those registered to vote can do so, and the government invariably runs nonpartisan get out the vote campaigns for each election to expand the franchise as much as possible.

== United States ==
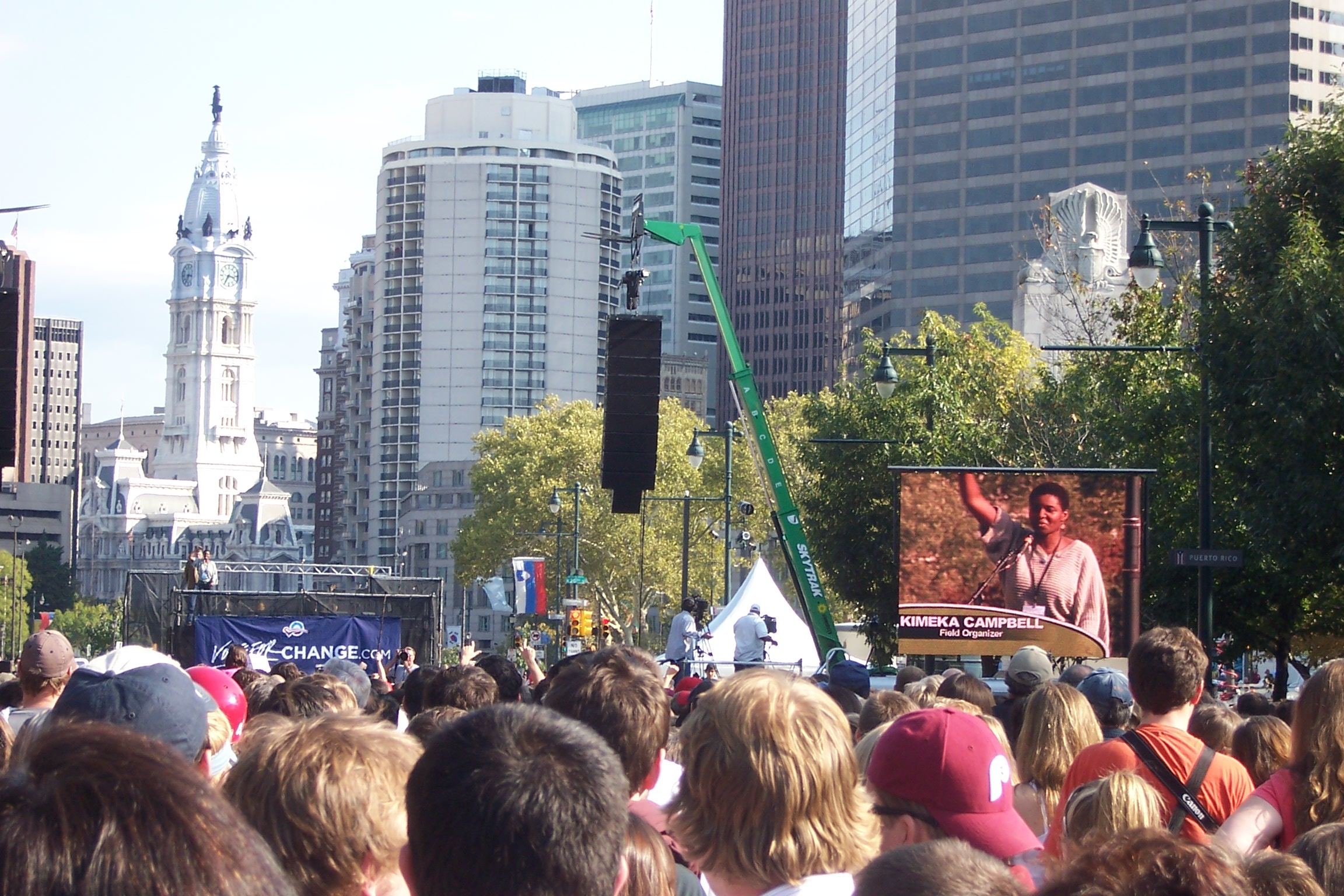
An October 2008 voter registration rally held on behalf of Barack Obama's presidential campaign, on Philadelphia's Benjamin Franklin Parkway.

In the United States, such drives are often undertaken by a political campaign, political party, or other outside groups (partisan and non-partisan), that seeks to register persons who are eligible to vote but are not registered. In all U.S. states except North Dakota, registration is a prerequisite to a person being able to vote at federal, state or local elections, as well as to serve on juries and perform other civil duties. Sometimes these drives are undertaken for partisan purposes, and target specific demographic groups considered to be likely to vote for one candidate or other; on the other hand, such drives are sometimes undertaken by non-partisan groups and targeted more generally.

=== Controversies ===
In 2004, the Nu Mu Lambda chapter of Alpha Phi Alpha fraternity held a voter registration drive in DeKalb County, Georgia, from which Georgia Secretary of State Cathy Cox (Dem.) rejected all 63 voter registration applications on the basis that the fraternity did not follow correct procedures, including obtaining specific pre-clearance from the state to conduct their drive. Nu Mu Lambda filed Charles H. Wesley Education Foundation v. Cathy Cox (Wesley v. Cox) on the basis that Georgia's long-standing policy and practice of rejecting mail-in voter registration applications that were submitted in bundles, by persons other than registrars, deputy registrars, or "authorized persons", violated the requirements of the National Voter Registration Act of 1993 by undermining voter registration drives. A senior U.S. District Judge upheld earlier federal court decisions in the case, which also found private entities have a right, under the federal law, to engage in organized voter registration activity in Georgia at times and locations of their choosing, without the presence or permission of state or local election officials.

In 2019, Tennessee lawmakers contemplated passing legislation to make it more difficult to carry out voter registration drives by limiting the time frame in which collected registrations had to be filed and requiring organizers to provide information about the drive to county officials in advance, with criminal penalties for violations of these provisions.

=== Organizations ===
Notable national organizations that regularly work to register voters and promote citizens' engagement in elections include:

- Advancement Project
- Close Up Foundation
- Democrats Abroad
- HeadCount
- League of Women Voters
- Let America Vote
- National Association for the Advancement of Colored People
- Nonprofit VOTE
- Our Time
- Rock the Vote
- Southern Regional Council
- Southwest Voter Registration Education Project
- Student Association for Voter Empowerment
- The Voter Participation Center
- U.S. Vote Foundation
- United States Hispanic Chamber of Commerce
- Vote.org
- Voto Latino
