= List of Cocomelon Lane episodes =

Cocomelon Lane is an American-Canadian animated television series based on the Cocomelon YouTube channel.

As of April 20, 2026, 28 episodes of Cocomelon Lane have been released.

== Series overview ==
Season	Segments	Episodes	Originally released
1	28	9	November 17, 2023
2	15	5	April 22, 2024
3	N/A	1	August 19, 2024
4	9	3	March 17, 2025
5	8	4	August 18, 2025
6	4	2	December 1, 2025
7	10	4	April 20, 2026

== Episodes ==
=== Season 1 (2023–24) ===
No. overall	No. in season	Title	Directed by	Written by	Original release date	Prod. code
1a	1a	"JJ's Firetruck Car Wash"	Clint Butler & Mauro Casalese	Nida Chowdhry, Cameron Hope & Guy Toubes	November 13, 2023	CL-101a
The kids tackle a big mission at the fire station.
1b	1b	"Cody's Cake for Mommy"	Clint Butler	Nida Chowdhry and Cameron Hope	November 17, 2023	CL-101b
Cody and his dad make a special birthday cake for Mommy.
1c	1c	"Nina's Wheels on the Bus"	Mauro Casalese	Nida Chowdhry, Cameron Hope & Guy Toubes	November 21, 2023	CL-101c
Nina rides the school bus for the first time.
2a	2a	"JJ's Bear Dance"	Clint Butler, Mauro Casalese & Terry Izumi	Rick Suvalle	November 24, 2023	CL-102a
JJ visits an animal park with his family, but where are the bears?
2b	2b	"Nina Meets the Garbage Truck"	Clint Butler, Mauro Casalese & Terry Izumi	Nida Chowdhry, Cameron Hope & Rachel Reuben	November 26, 2023	CL-102b
Nina gets to see the garbage truck up close.
2c	2c	"Bella's Pajama Party"	Clint Butler, Mauro Casalese Mike Dowding & Terry Izumi	Nida Chowdhry, Cameron Hope John Derelvany Laurie Israel Rachel Ruderman Chuck Tately Hanah Lee Cook Steve Socki Arne Wong & Rachel Reuben	November 27, 2023	CL-102c
Bella sleeps over at Cece's house.
3a	3a	"JJ Plants a Seed"	Clint Butler, Mauro Casalese Allan Jacobsen Mick Harrison Oren Mashkovski & Mike Dowding	Joey Clift, Shawnee Gibbs Clint Bulter Mauro Casalese & Shawnelle Gibbs	November 17, 2023	CL-103a
JJ learns how seeds grow at his grandparents' farm.
3b	3b	"Cece's First Haircut"	Clint Butler, Mauro Casalese & Mike Dowding	Joey Clift, Shawnee Gibbs & Shawnelle Gibbs	November 23, 2023	CL-103b
Cece is nervous about getting a haircut.
3c	3c	"Cody's Long Car Ride"	Clint Butler, Mauro Casalese Lynn Reist & Mike Dowding	Joey Clift, Shawnee Gibbs & Shawnelle Gibbs	November 17, 2023	CL-103c
Cody goes on a long car ride.
3d	3d	"Cece's Purr-Fect Pal"	Clint Butler, Mauro Casalese Brad Neave & Terry Izumi	Joey Clift, Shawnee Gibbs & Shawnelle Gibbs	November 17, 2023	CL-103d
Cece makes a furry new friend, the kitty cat.
4a	4a	"JJ's Gotta Go"	Clint Butler & Mauro Casalese	Shawnee Gibbs, Shawnelle Gibbs & Niki Lytton	November 29, 2023	CL-104a
JJ has to go potty, but doesn't want to take a break.
4b	4b	"Nina's Nature Walk"	Clint Butler & Mauro Casalese	Shawnee Gibbs, Shawnelle Gibbs & Niki Lytton	November 17, 2023	CL-104b
The kids go on a nature walk to see different animals.
4c	4c	"Cody Goes to the Dentist"	Clint Butler & Mauro Casalese	Shawnee Gibbs, Shawnelle Gibbs & Niki Lytton	January 19, 2024	CL-104c
Cody gets his teeth cleaned at the dentist.
5a	5a	"JJ's Family Chore Games"	Clint Butler, Mauro Casalese Dave Barton Thomas & Mike Dowding	Guy Toubes & Brandon Violette	November 17, 2023	CL-105a
At JJ's house, doing chores together is a fun family game!
5b	5b	"Cody's Kiddie Coaster"	Clint Butler, Mauro Casalese & Mike Dowding	Rick Ritter Guy Toubes & Brandon Violette	November 17, 2023	CL-105b
A rainy day changes Cody's plans to stay inside the house with his dad.
5c	5c	"Nina's New Shoes"	Clint Butler, Mauro Casalese & Mike Dowding	Guy Toubes & Brandon Violette	November 17, 2023	CL-105c
Nina gets new shoes at the shoe shop.
6a	6a	"JJ's Ready for Spaghetti"	Clint Butler & Mauro Casalese	Joey Clift, Shawnee Gibbs & Shawnelle Gibbs	November 17, 2023	CL-106a
JJ has a "food adventure" at Nico's house!
6b	6b	"Cece's Water Dance"	Clint Butler & Mauro Casalese	Joey Clift, Shawnee Gibbs & Shawnelle Gibbs	November 17, 2023	CL-106b
Cece braves the pool for her first swimming lesson.
6c	6c	"Not Nico's Birthday Present"	Clint Butler & Mauro Casalese	Joey Clift, Shawnee Gibbs & Shawnelle Gibbs	November 17, 2023	CL-106c
Nico learns that giving gifts to others feels great!
7a	7a	"Bella's Bug Adventure"	Clint Butler, Mauro Casalese & Terry Izumi	Nida Chowdhry, Hanah Lee Cook & Guy Toubes	March 19, 2024	CL-107a
Bella goes on a "bug adventure" with Luke.
7b	7b	"Cece's Family Game Night"	Clint Butler, Mauro Casalese & Terry Izumi	Nida Chowdhry, Hanah Lee Cook & Guy Toubes	November 17, 2023	CL-107b
On family game night, Cece learns how to take turns.
7c	7c	"Nico's Flower for Papa"	Clint Butler, Mauro Casalese & Terry Izumi	Nida Chowdhry, Hanah Lee Cook & Guy Toubes	November 17, 2023	CL-107c
Nico and his dad pick out a special flower for Papa.
8a	8a	"Nina's Three-Legged Race"	Clint Butler, Mauro Casalese & Terry Izumi	Ernie Bustamante, Dan Danko & Noëlle Lara	November 17, 2023	CL-108a
Bella and Nina must work together to finish the three-legged race.
8b	8b	"Say Cheese, Nico!"	Clint Butler, Mauro Casalese & Terry Izumi	Ernie Bustamante, Dan Danko & Noëlle Lara	November 17, 2023	CL-108b
Nico, Dad, and Papa take a family picture.
8c	8c	"Nina Shares a Treat"	Clint Butler, Mauro Casalese & Terry Izumi	Ernie Bustamante, Dan Danko & Noëlle Lara	November 17, 2023	CL-108c
Nina helps her abuela make empanadas for school.
9a	9a	"JJ is Mommy's Helper Hero"	Mike Dowding, Clint Butler & Mauro Casalese	Nida Chowdhry, Dan Danko & Dan Salgarolo	November 17, 2023	CL-109a
JJ helps his mom at the farmers market.
9b	9b	"Nina's Treasure Hunt"	Mike Dowding, Clint Butler & Mauro Casalese	Nida Chowdhry, Dan Danko & Dan Salgarolo	November 17, 2023	CL-109b
Nina and her abuela shop for colorful fruit.
9c	9c	"Nico's Magic Words Field Trip"	Mike Dowding, Clint Butler & Mauro Casalese	Nida Chowdhry, Dan Danko Shelley Hoffman Robert Pimcombe & Dan Salgarolo	November 17, 2023	CL-109c
At a café, the kids learn the power of "please" and "thank you".

=== Season 2 (2024) ===
No. overall	No. in season	Title	Written by	Original release date	Prod. code
10a	1a	"JJ's Big Build"	Adam Beechen, Hanah Lee Cook & Cameron Hope	June 21, 2024	CL-201a
JJ joins his dad at a construction site.
10b	1b	"Cody Meets a Dinosaur"	Adam Beechen, Hanah Lee Cook & Cameron Hope	April 26, 2024	CL-201b
Cody visits his favorite dinosaur at the museum.
10c	1c	"Nina's Trike Ride"	Adam Beechen, Hanah Lee Cook & Cameron Hope	May 1, 2024	CL-201c
On a bike ride with her family, Nina learns all about safety.
11a	2a	"JJ Gets a Checkup"	Adam Beechen, Nida Chowdhry & Cameron Hope	May 15, 2024	CL-202a
JJ's going to the doctor for a checkup, but isn't sure what to expect.
11b	2b	"Cody's First Train Ride"	Adam Beechen, Nida Chowdhry & Cameron Hope	April 22, 2024	CL-202b
Cody learns that trains are big — and loud!
11c	2c	"Bella's Butterfly Goodbye"	Adam Beechen, Nida Chowdhry & Cameron Hope	April 22, 2024	CL-202c
Bella's pet caterpillar turns into a butterfly.
12a	3a	"JJ's Bath Time for Bingo"	Cameron Hope, Guy Toubes & Brandon Violette	April 22, 2024	CL-203a
Bingo needs a bath, and JJ is going to help!
12b	3b	"Cece Goes Camping"	Cameron Hope, Guy Toubes & Brandon Violette	April 22, 2024	CL-203b
Cece's afraid to sleep outside without her nightlight.
12c	3c	"Nina's Good Game"	Cameron Hope, Guy Toubes & Brandon Violette	July 31, 2025	CL-203c
Nina does not score a goal at her first soccer game.
13a	4a	"Cece Visits the Library"	Cynthia Furey, Cameron Hope & Rachel Reuben	July 9, 2024	CL-204a
Cece has to return her favorite library book.
13b	4b	"Cody's Lullaby for Kendi"	Cynthia Furey, Cameron Hope & Rachel Reuben	September 28, 2024	CL-204b
Cody helps Kendi fall asleep by singing a lullaby.
13c	4c	"Cece Sends a Letter"	Cynthia Furey, Cameron Hope & Rachel Reuben	April 22, 2024	CL-204c
Cece's sending a letter to her grandma, but how will it get there?
14a	5a	"JJ Says Sorry"	Ernie Bustamante, Carleton Carter & Dan Danko	April 22, 2024	CL-205a
JJ borrows Cody's favorite toy dinosaur, but something bad happens.
14b	5b	"Cece Learns Chopsticks"	Ernie Bustamante, Carleton Carter & Dan Danko	April 22, 2024	CL-205b
Cece sits down for a fancy dinner with her family.
14c	5c	"Nina's Hat Dance"	Ernie Bustamante, Carleton Carter & Dan Danko	April 22, 2024	CL-205c
Nina rehearses for a special hat dance.

=== Season 3 (2024) ===
No. overall	No. in season	Title	Directed by	Written by	Original release date	Prod. code
15	1	"Cocomelon Lane: The Nursery Rhyme Musical"	Clint Butler, Mauro Casalese & Terry Izumi	Nida Chowdhry, Cameron Hope & Susan Kim	August 19, 2024	CL-301
The Melon Patch Academy kids want to surprise their teacher Ms. Appleberry with a special nursery rhyme musical! But can the show go on when plans unexpectedly change?

=== Season 4 (2025) ===
No. overall	No. in season	Title	Original release date	Prod. code
16	1	"JJ's Firetruck Birthday/Cody's Pet Party/Bella's Tea Party"	March 17, 2025	CL-401
JJ celebrates his birthday at the fire station./The kids dance and play at a pet party./Bella has her friends over for tea and yummy snacks.
17	2	"Cody's Show and Tell/JJ Gets a Boo Boo/Bella, the Pet Sitter"	March 17, 2025	CL-402
Cody picks out an item for show and tell./JJ hurts his knee while riding a scooter with TomTom and YoYo./Bella learns how to take care of Bingo.
18	3	"Nina Does Taekwondo/Bella's Beach Day/Cece's Daddy Daughter Dance Class"	March 17, 2025	CL-403
Nina takes her first Taekwondo class./Bella tries to enjoy beach day, but she feels overwhelmed!/Cece shows off her dancing skills.

=== Season 5 (2025) ===
No. overall	No. in season	Title	Directed by	Written by	Original release date	Prod. code
19	1	"JJ's Airport Welcome/Nina's Recycling Adventure (A Field Trip Story)"	Clint Butler, Mauro Casalese, Mike Dowding & Terry Izumi	Nida Chowdhry	August 18, 2025	CL-501
JJ and friends take a trip to the airport to paint a colorful mural. The kids learn how to sort bottles, cans and cardboard at the recycling center.
20	2	"Cody's Doggie Day/Cece and the Sea Animals (A Field Trip Story)"	Clint Butler, Mike Dowding & Terry Izumi	Rachel Reuben & Cameron Hope	August 18, 2025	CL-502
The kids visit the Pet Rescue, where Cody learns how to help a new puppy. A field trip to the tide pools inspires a game to make counting more fun.
21	3	"JJ's Pancake Party (A Field Trip Story)/Cody's Far Away Apple (A Field Trip Story)"	Clint Butler, Mauro Casalese & Terry Izumi	Rachel Reuben & Cameron Hope	August 18, 2025	CL-503
Cody's dad invites the kids to his café to make a special pancake breakfast. Then the gang visits an orchard to pick apples for the Harvest Festival.
22	4	"Nina Feeds the Giraffe/Nico's Baby Tree (A Field Trip Story)"	Clint Butler, Mauro Casalese, Mike Dowding & Terry Izumi	Rachel Reuben & Nida Chowdhry	August 18, 2025	CL-504
Nina learns how to wait her turn to feed a friendly giraffe. Later on, Nico and the kids discover that planting baby trees can be a messy job!

=== Season 6 (2025) ===
No. overall	No. in season	Title	Directed by	Written by	Original release date	Prod. code
23	1	"JJ's Christmas Special"	Clint Butler, Terry Izumi, and Steve Neilson	Nida Chowdhry, Rachel Reuben, and Guy Toubes	December 1, 2025	CL-601
CoComelon Lane is buzzing with holiday excitement when JJ visits Santa and learns how to help make his sister's snowy Christmas wish come true.
24	2	"Cody's Christmas Wish/JJ Spins the Dreidel/Cody's Snow Day"	Clint Butler, Mauro Casalese, and Mike Dowding	Cameron Hope, Rachel Reuben, and Dan Salgarolo	December 1, 2025	CL-602
Cody's too excited to sleep on Christmas Eve./JJ and his friends visit Nico's house to celebrate Hanukkah./Cody plays in the snow for the first time.

=== Season 7 (2026) ===
No. overall	No. in season	Title	Directed by	Written by	Original release date	Prod. code
25	1	"JJ's Sheep Roundup/Nico's Lion Adventure/Cece's Kitty Castle"	Clint Butler, Mauro Casalese, and Mike Dowding	Nida Chowdhry, Cameron Hope, and Rachel Reuben	April 20, 2026	CL-701
JJ grooms sheep on his grandparent's farm./Nico looks for a lion cub at the animal rescue./Cece can't wait to play with her kitty cat toy blocks.
26	2	"Nina's Soccer Count/Bella's Lost Hamster/Cece's Funny Faces"	Clint Butler, Mauro Casalese, and Mike Dowding	Nida Chowdhry, Cameron Hope, and Rachel Reuben	April 20, 2026	CL-702
The kids have a soccer match and Nina gets the team ready to play./Bella takes care of the class pet./Cece learns to stand still for the class photo.
27	3	"Nico's Guess Who Party/Cody's Little Lamb/Nina's Awesome Errand Day"	Clint Butler, Mauro Casalese, and Mike Dowding	Nida Chowdhry, Cameron Hope, and Rachel Reuben	April 20, 2026	CL-703
The kids attend Nico's costume party./Cody decides what to do with an old toy./Nina uses her mind to make things fun while running errands with her mom.
28	4	"CoComelon Day Parade"	Clint Butler and Mike Dowding	Guy Toubes and Brandon Violette	April 20, 2026	CL-704
It's JJ's first time in the town's favorite parade. After building a float with his class, JJ helps his dad reveal a special surprise for all the kids.
