= CoComelon: The Movie =

Upcoming DreamWorks Animation film

- Theatrical release poster
- Directed by: Kat Good
- Screenplay by: Adam Pava
- Based on: CoComelon by Moonbug Entertainment
- Starring: SZA; Connor Esterson; Ike Barinholtz; Nicholas Hoult; Rhys Darby; Cristo Fernández; Josh Johnson; Ego Nwodim; Matt Friend; Sarah Sherman
- Edited by: Tony Molina
- Music by: Tom Howe
- Production companies: DreamWorks Animation; Moonbug Entertainment; Flywheel Media; Prime Focus Studios
- Distributed by: Universal Pictures
- Release dates: February 12, 2027 (United Kingdom); February 19, 2027 (United States)
- Countries: United Kingdom; United States
- Language: English

CoComelon: The Movie is an upcoming animated musical adventure comedy film loosely based on the YouTube series CoComelon created by Moonbug Entertainment. The film is produced by DreamWorks Animation, Moonbug, Flywheel Media, and Prime Focus Studios. Directed by Kat Good (in her feature directorial debut), it stars SZA, Connor Esterson, Ike Barinholtz, Nicholas Hoult, Rhys Darby, Cristo Fernández, Josh Johnson, Ego Nwodim, Matt Friend, and Sarah Sherman.

CoComelon: The Movie is scheduled to be released in the United States by Universal Pictures on February 19, 2027.

== Premise ==
When JJ's beloved stuffed bear goes missing, he and his friends head to a magical land where there's one rule: no singing.

== Voice cast ==
- Connor Esterson as JJ
- Camden Brooks as Cody
- Olivia London Leyva as Nina
- Aerina Park DeBoer as CeCe
- Nicholas Hoult as Boba, JJ's stuffed teddy bear who ends up being trapped in the magical land of Lost and Found by Princess Harmony
- SZA as Princess Harmony, the ruler of the magical land of Lost and Found where a "no singing" rule is enforced
- Ike Barinholtz as Chicken Peels, a half-chicken, half-banana who is Princess Harmony's right-hand enforcer
- Rhys Darby as Lefty, a sock puppet who guides JJ and his friends to help him find Boba

Additionally, Sarah Sherman, Ego Nwodim, Cristo Fernández, Josh Johnson, Matt Friend, and Jim J. Bullock have been cast in undisclosed roles.

== Production ==
In April 2023, Bloomberg reported that an animated CoComelon film was in the works at Universal Pictures, DreamWorks Animation and Moonbug Entertainment. The film was officially announced in May 2025 with Prime Focus Studios and Flywheel Media joining the project, and DNEG Animation providing animation services. Kathleen Thorson Good will direct the project, while Adam Pava will write the screenplay. In May 2026, the voice cast was revealed.

Alongside the release of the official trailer, it was announced that Tom Howe would compose the score, while Justin Tranter would serve as the executive music producer for ten original songs.

== Release ==
CoComelon: The Movie is scheduled to be theatrically released by Universal Pictures in the United States on February 19, 2027. The film was originally planned for release on February 26. It will be released in the United Kingdom a week earlier on February 12.
