= Mia's Magic Playground =

Children's animated television series

- Genre: Preschool
- Countries of origin: Norway; United Kingdom
- No. of seasons: 2
- No. of episodes: 24

Production
- Running time: 7 minutes
- Production companies: Moonbug Entertainment; NENT Group

Original release
- Network: Viaplay; YouTube
- Release: February 21, 2020 – March 31, 2023

Mia's Magic Playground is a British animated children's television series produced by Moonbug Entertainment and NENT Group. The show is designed for four to six year olds and is a spin-off Moonbug's other franchise Little Baby Bum, the main character of which being Mia, the lead of the show.

The show premiered on Viaplay in early 2020. It is also available to stream on Amazon Prime Video, NOW and the Sky Kids app.

== Premise ==
The show revolves around a young girl named Mia and her two friends, Oskar and Tilde who visit a magical, imaginary land in which she invents pages in her notebook which detail the adventures she has. The imaginary land is home to her anthropomorphic friends, such as a talking ice cream, small leaf creatures and a soccer-playing dinosaurs.

== Characters ==
- Mia is a young brunette girl who wears a red hat. She is a creative and imaginative girl who explores her imaginary world with Oskar and Tilde, adding pages to her notebook.
- Tilde is a shy and timid girl who is slowly learning to come out of her shell. She is very artistic and loves to draw and paint. She is usually seen wearing a purple hat and yellow shirt.
- Oskar is helpful boy who comes up with plans to solve problems Mia and Tilde face.
- Nicecream Bear is an ice cream shaped bear who gives treats to Mia and her friends. He is very wise and often gives advice to them.
- Gumbelina is a mischievous but playful fairy who is always up for an adventure and look for ways to get into trouble.
- Octo-Bubbly is gentle octopus who lives in the Magic Playground's pond. He is always willing to help Mia and her friends, and often plays games with them.
- The Leafthings are group of small leaf creatures who help and often play with Mia and her friends.
- The SoccerSauruses are group of friendly dinosaurs who play soccer, sometimes by themselves or with Mia and her friends.
