= ATTN: =

US media company

ATTN:, Inc.
- Founded: 2014; 12 years ago in Los Angeles, California, United States
- Founders: Matthew Segal and Jarrett Moreno
- Headquarters: Los Angeles, California, United States
- Owner: Candle Media
- Number of employees: 120
- Website: www.attn.com

ATTN:, Inc. (stylized in all lowercase) is a digital media company based in Los Angeles, California. As of January 2018, the company receives millions of monthly video views, primarily on social media platforms like Facebook, Instagram, TikTok, and YouTube.

ATTN: was founded in 2014 by Matthew Segal and Jarrett Moreno. According to the company, they "break down important societal topics and conversations into digestible, entertaining videos and series across all platforms and are leaders when it comes to reaching people who want context on the issues and conversations that matter to them". The New York Times stated that ATTN: is "particularly skilled at translating complicated issues into short, cogent content."

In May 2022, Candle Media announced that it would acquire ATTN: for $100 million.

In February 2026, Candle Media sold a majority of ATTN: back to co-founders Matthew Segal and Jarrett Moreno .

== History ==
Prior to founding ATTN:, Matthew Segal and Jarrett Moreno started Ourtime.org, a nonprofit dedicated to promoting voter registration among young people.

== Funding ==
In November 2014, Segal and Moreno founded ATTN: in Los Angeles and raised $4.1 million from several investors including Marc Rowan, RTS Ventures, Ross Levinsohn, Hope Taitz, The Seacrest Global Group and Troy Carter.

In February 2016, ATTN: raised $18 million in a Series B led by Evolution Media Partners that also included Main Street Advisors. Comedian Bill Maher is also an investor and has stated that, “in 90-second videos, ATTN:’s getting young people to care about things that actually matter.”

In November 2016, ATTN: and Tribune Media announced a strategic distribution partnership that also included an investment by Tribune in ATTN:.

== Formats ==
ATTN:’s content focuses primarily on subjects that matter to Millennials and Gen Z like the environment, health and wellness, social issues, and personal finance. The company consists of producers and creatives as well as an in-house production and animation studio that produces original video content primarily for social distribution, but more recently also for streaming services such as Apple Music, HBO Go and Spotify and networks like NBC, ABC, CBS, Freeform and MTV.

ATTN:’s most popular videos are custom made for consumption on social media: short, viral videos with subtitles for viewing without sound. Within this format, they have found particular success with mid-form content for social, specifically with IGTV and TikTok, for whom they have created several series including one featuring former First Lady Michelle Obama and a scripted series in partnership with producer and creator Lena Waithe

They also produce original live-action videos, such as a series on parenting that stars Nev Schulman, the host of MTV's Catfish, and his wife Laura Perlongo. The company has also developed several original series for Facebook Watch, including a modern dating hit entitled "We Need to Talk" and a series with Zooey Deschanel titled “Your Food Roots”.

Since its founding, ATTN: has had an in-house team of animators in their Los Angeles offices. ATTN: recently premiered an animated horoscope series developed alongside Will Arnett. They use animation for videos that break down complex political issues such as gerrymandering, comprehensive immigration reform and the Electoral College.

The company also has a large branded team and creative agency that works with partners to create custom content for social distribution. In 2021, ATTN: announced the launch of a TikTok Studio to create content specifically for distribution on the platform and to work with partners on their TikTok strategy, targeting Gen Z audiences with short form video content.
