= Kevin A. Mayer =

American business executive (born 1962)

- Born: 1962 (age 63–64); United States
- Education: MIT (BS); San Diego State University (MS); Harvard University (MBA)
- Occupation: Business executive
- Title: Co-founder and co-CEO of Candle Media

Kevin A. Mayer (born 1962) is an American business executive. He is the co-founder and co-CEO of Candle Media as well as a Founding Partner of Smash Capital. He was briefly CEO of TikTok, and COO of its parent company ByteDance. Prior to joining TikTok, he was a senior executive at Disney for more than 15 years, including as head of Walt Disney Direct-to-Consumer & International.

== Education ==
Mayer earned a bachelor of science in mechanical engineering from the Massachusetts Institute of Technology (MIT), a master of science in electrical engineering from San Diego State University, and an MBA from Harvard Business School.

== Career ==
=== Disney ===
In 1993, Mayer began working at The Walt Disney Company handling strategy and business development for Disney's Interactive/Internet and television businesses. He was later promoted to head the Disney Internet group as executive vice president.

In February 2000, Mayer was named CEO of Playboy.com, the digital subsidiary of Chicago's Playboy Enterprises. In September 2000, he left Playboy and became chairman and CEO of Clear Channel Interactive, a division of Clear Channel Worldwide. He was in that position until December 2001. He joined L.E.K. Consulting as a partner and head of the global media and entertainment practice in February 2002.

Mayer rejoined Disney in June 2005 as executive vice president of corporate strategy, business development, and technology, and was designated as an executive officer in October 2005. He oversaw Disney's acquisition of BamTech Media, Pixar, Marvel Entertainment, Lucasfilm, Club Penguin, and Maker Studios, as well as its agreement reached in December 2017 to acquire 21st Century Fox. In 2010, he arranged the sale of Miramax to Filmyard Holdings.

In March 2018, Mayer was named chairman of Walt Disney Direct-to-Consumer & International. In this capacity he headed Disney's global streaming business, including Disney+, Hulu, ESPN+, and Hotstar; its international media and studio operations; global ad sales; and global content and channel sales.

=== ByteDance and TikTok ===
In May 2020, Mayer resigned from The Walt Disney Company to become COO of Chinese internet technology company ByteDance Ltd and CEO of its social media app TikTok. On August 26, less than four months after taking the position, Mayer announced that he would step down from both roles and leave ByteDance altogether. His decision was due to ByteDance being ordered by the Donald Trump administration to sell its U.S. operations by mid-September 2020.

=== New companies ===
In October 2020, Mayer and Tom Staggs, also formerly of Disney, led the founding of special-purpose acquisition company (SPAC) Forest Road Acquisition Corp. The company began public trading in November 2020 as FRX. In February 2021, the company entered an agreement to merge with Beachbody and Myx Fitness Holdings, and also filed for an IPO for a second SPAC, Forest Road Acquisition Corp II (FRXB), of which Mayer and Staggs were co-chairs and co-CEOs. In April 2023, Mayer and Staggs resigned from the company.

In 2021, Mayer and Staggs founded and launched Candle Media, a Blackstone-backed media company, and they are co-CEOs of the company. The company has made several acquisitions, including Hello Sunshine, Moonbug Entertainment, a 10% stake in Westbrook, and ATTN:. Candle Media and TikTok entered into a strategic partnership in 2023.

In July 2023, Bob Iger, the CEO of The Walt Disney Company, appointed Mayer as a consultant to the company.
