= Matthew Segal =

American political activist

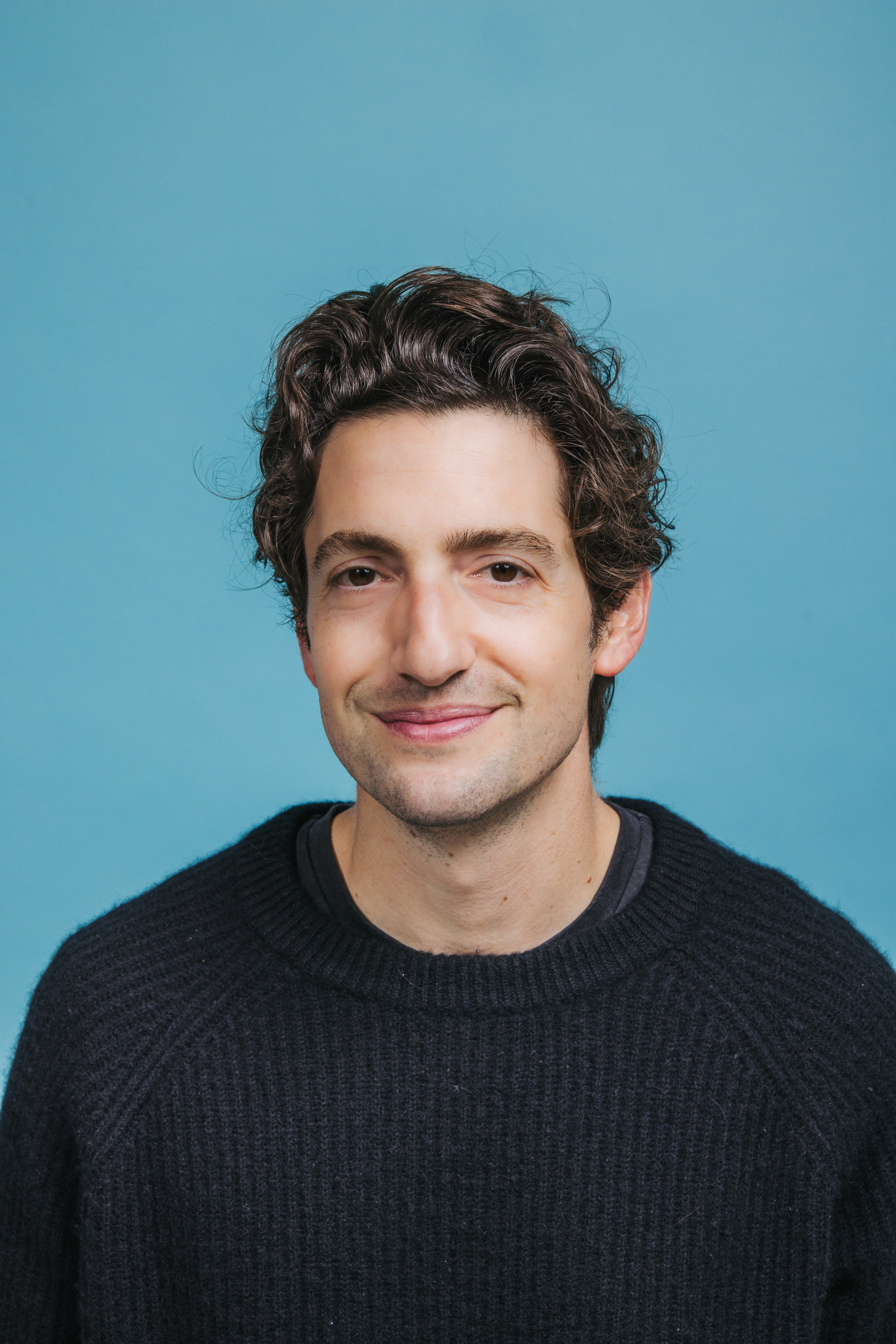
- Born: October 18, 1985 (age 40); Chicago, IL
- Education: Kenyon College
- Occupation: Media executive
- Website: www.attn.com

Matthew Segal is an American entrepreneur and media executive who co-founded ATTN:, a social video publisher and entertainment studio with a mission to convey important topics through entertainment. The company was acquired by Blackstone's Candle Media for a reported 150 million dollars. Segal previously co-founded OurTime.org, a national voter empowerment network for young Americans. In January 2025, he was given a presidential appointment to the board of trustees for the Holocaust Memorial Council.

== Early life and education ==
Segal was born in Chicago, Illinois, attended New Trier High School, and graduated magna cum laude from Kenyon College in 2008. He became an advocate for student voting rights in college after his campus polling place experienced the longest lines in the 2004 presidential election.

Segal is Jewish. Both his grandfathers served in World War II. He has cited their stories and experiences as catalysts for his work to combat antisemitism.

== Career ==
Prior to co-founding ATTN:, Segal was a young voter advocate who testified multiple times before Congress on issues relating to expanding youth voters' franchise around issues affecting them. Segal co-founded OurTime.org with Jarrett Moreno with the goal of deepening civic engagement among his generation through a number of strategies including making colleges teach voter registration and an initiative to support businesses founded and run by entrepreneurs under 30.

== ATTN ==
Segal and Our Time co-founder Jarrett Moreno launched ATTN: in 2014 to create "content that breaks down complex issues, making politics interesting for millennials, and analyzes the world from the perspective of the social media generation." Segal oversees the original content development department for the company. Under his leadership, ATTN:’s content has received more than 18 billion video views, has been watched for over 9 billion minutes, and the company’s platforms have a combined 19 million followers.

The company produces original video content of all length, including short form for social consumption across all major platforms, mid form for more in-depth story-telling, and long form for linear television and streaming services.

In 2023, Segal spearheaded an event along with First Lady Jill Biden at Independence Hall in Philadelphia to celebrate the launch of “Well Versed,” a new animated musical series produced by ATTN: that aired on Nickelodeon designed to teach young viewers about civics and democracy.

In 2021, ATTN: created and Segal served as executive producer for a special called Roll Up Your Sleeves that aired on NBC to educate viewers about protection from COVID-19. Segal was also responsible for creating a primetime special that aired on ABC in 2020 called VOMO: Vote or Miss Out that was hosted by Kevin Hart and featured political figures from both parties and more than 20 celebrities encouraging electoral participation in the upcoming election.

In 2018, Segal and ATTN: created a 10-episode mini-series on IGTV (which later became Instagram Reels) featuring then former VP Joe Biden called Here's the Deal, which was the first-ever IGTV series by a national politician and the company has also produced a series of videos with Barack Obama in 2018, 2020, and 2022 encouraging young voters to participate in elections.

In addition to those projects, ATTN: has developed and produced video content featuring Arnold Schwarzenegger condemning hate and antisemitism that has garnered hundreds of millions views, and an Emmy nominated original series with Zooey Deschanel to promote healthy eating called What Am I Eating?.

In 2019, ATTN: was named to Fast Company's list of Most Innovative Companies, and has won numerous awards including Shorty Awards, Webby Awards, a Tribeca X award, and more. Segal was named to The Hollywood Reporter's Next Gen list in 2017 which recognizes 35 individuals in the entertainment industry under 35 years-old who are considered Hollywood's future leaders.

In 2022, Candle Media acquired ATTN: for $150M in a cash and stock deal. The deal ensured that Segal and Moreno would continue to oversee day-to-day operations of ATTN:. Prior to the acquisition, the company had raised $37M over three separate funding rounds since it was founded, including investments from Marc Rowan, Bill Maher, Ryan Seacrest, Paul Wachter, Jimmy Iovine, Tom Werner, and TPG.

The company is based in Los Angeles with offices in New York, and currently has about 130 employees.

== Combating antisemitism ==
As part of his work with ATTN:, Jewish Insider reported that Segal had "devoted significant resources to combating antisemitism." He served as an executive producer of The Hate We Can't Forget: A Holocaust Memorial Special and Undeniable: The Truth To Remember, two primetime specials that aired on Paramount platforms around International Holocaust Remembrance Day in 2022. In 2023, ATTN: produced a video featuring U.S. Secretary of State Antony Blinken in partnership with the State Department and the World Jewish Congress marking YomHashoah that received over 2 million views. The company also produced a video with the World Jewish Congress, the Anti-Defamation League, and the International Holocaust Remembrance Alliance that explores the roots of antisemitism and how it is defined today. President Biden appointed him to the Holocaust Memorial Council Board of Trustees in January 2025.

== Public appearances ==
Segal was a contributor to ABC News and has been featured on CBS News, C-SPAN, MSNBC, Fox, CNN and HBO's Real Time with Bill Maher. He delivered the keynote address for the USC Iovine and Young Academy's second commencement ceremony in 2019.
