= Blippi =

YouTube channel aimed at toddlers

- Genre: Preschool
- Created by: Stevin John
- Developed by: Moonbug Entertainment, Candle Media (2021–present)
- Starring: Stevin John; Clayton Grimm; Ben Mayer
- Voices of: Stevin John; Clayton Grimm; Ben Mayer
- Country of origin: United States

Production
- Production location: Hollywood, Los Angeles, California
- Production companies: Moonbug Entertainment; Candle Media

Original release
- Network: YouTube
- Release: February 18, 2014

Blippi is an American educational YouTube channel aimed at toddlers and young children. The show features a cheerful, energetic character named Blippi, who takes viewers on adventures to places like factories, play parks, and zoos. As he tours these locations, Blippi shares his experiences directly with his audience, asking questions and explaining unfamiliar concepts. Blippi was acquired by Moonbug Entertainment in 2020, and became a subsidiary of Candle Media on November 1, 2021.

== History ==
The show was created and the character originally played by Stevin John. He posted the first episode of the show on YouTube in January 2014, which featured tractors. Aiming to keep Blippi going, John joined the multi-channel network Moonbug Entertainment in 2020, which became a subsidiary of Candle Media on November 1, 2021. The show is dubbed in Spanish, French, Portuguese, German, Japanese, Italian, Hebrew, Arabic, Swedish, Danish, Welsh, and Polish.

Until May 2021, the Blippi character was only portrayed by Stevin John. On May 8, Clayton Grimm, who had played Blippi in live performances, performed as Blippi for the first time on the channel and hosted as an alternative Blippi with John. On October 9, 2021, Moonbug announced the addition of a new character named Meekah (played by Kaitlin Becker and Cashae Monya). The spin-off series Blippi's Treehouse started airing on December 1, 2021, on Amazon Kids+, with two puppet characters, Scratch and Patch.

On November 16, 2024, Ben Mayer started performing as Blippi on the new series Blippi's Vroom Vroom Vehicle Show.

=== Controversy ===
In 2019, Stevin John's pre-stardom video of defecating on a friend for edgy internet humor went viral, receiving criticism from parents and fans alike.

=== Distribution ===
On October 13, 2022, Moonbug Entertainment partnered with Virgin Media to bring Blippi and other Moonbug programs to the United Kingdom. The show expanded to Southeast Asia in March 2021 when Moonbug partnered with POPS Worldwide to bring children's content to the POPS Kids app. Netflix acquired the streaming license to Blippi in January 2022.

== Licensing and merchandise ==
In 2019, Blippi signed a master toy deal with Jazwares to sell a variety of merchandise, including toy vehicles, plush, and other toys based on the Blippi show, beginning in spring 2020.

In early 2020, Jazwares created "My Buddy Blippi," a plush toy that can recreate 15 of the character's sounds and phrases.

In January 2021, Blippi launched an additional toy line.

In addition to toys, books, and more, Blippi merchandise also includes clothing.

== Blippi the Musical ==
Blippi the Musical is a live show produced by Round Room Live in partnership with Moonbug Entertainment, and was scheduled to tour North America in summer 2021. In previous tours of Blippi, there had been some outcry as a result of the performances not being performed by Stevin John but by another actor. Originally scheduled in 2020, live performances were postponed due to the COVID-19 pandemic.

== Blippi Wonders ==
Blippi Wonders is an animated children's web series based on Stevin John's Blippi. The series is about Blippi, along with either TABBS (an orange cat) or D bo (a blue dog) on a blue car called the Blippi Mobile. The Blippi Mobile can change into many elements, such as adding wings, and can shrink down. The series is produced by London-based Moonbug Entertainment, Italy-based Rainbow CGI, and based on a Nova Scotia production services provided by IoM Media Ventures.

== Reception ==
Nathan J. Robinson of Current Affairs criticized Blippi's programming, calling it "dead and sterile" and lacking intellectual curiosity that children can understand.
