= Declare Yourself =

Organization

Declare Yourself was an American campaign that aimed to encourage young people to register to vote. The campaign was founded by philanthropist, Norman Lear in 2004 and was led by former American presidents Jimmy Carter and Gerald Ford. The 2004 campaign consisted of a road trip to towns across the country to educate people about the United States Declaration of Independence and voting rights. The 2006 campaign involved public service announcements that compared not voting to people silencing themselves and not standing up for their beliefs. The 2008 campaign consisted of videos posted on YouTube and MySpace to promote voting and the 2011 campaign featured a bondage-themed photo series comparing not voting to restricting yourself. In 2011, Declare Yourself merged with another campaign to form the nonprofit, Our Time.

== Purpose ==
The DOI Road Trip's stated mission was to engage and energize all Americans, particularly young people, by bringing the Declaration to them. According to a press release, "This non-profit nonpartisan project hopes to inspire Americans to participate in civic activism, to exercise their rights and to vote. The Declaration of Independence Road Trip will travel to cities and towns across the United States, creatively combining elements of education, entertainment, and community outreach."

Founded by TV producer and philanthropist Norman Lear, and led by Honorary Co-Chairs and former Presidents Jimmy Carter and Gerald Ford, "Declare Yourself" is described in their literature as a "national nonpartisan, nonprofit campaign initiated in 2004 to energize and empower a new movement of young voters to participate in the 2004 presidential election." From January through Election Day 2004, over one million young and first-time voters registered to vote through events at Declare Yourself's spoken word and music tour of college campuses.

== Commercials ==
In 2006, three public service announcements (PSAs) were released, each directed by David LaChapelle. They pretend to be clichéd commercials for different products but all end with the same ending: Silence. After the image, there's an eerie silence as the words "Only You Can Silence Yourself" appear, followed by a voice whispering "Register to vote now."

Dog Food

A dog food ad where a woman comments how her dog has not a care in the world and chooses the brand "Apathy" and hopes that she will be like the dog and be taken care of herself. Suddenly we cut to an image of her on all fours with a muzzle on. Watch Dog Food PSA on YouTube

Phat Ride

A typical ad in the style of Pimp My Ride, when it ends as a mechanic has nailed his mouth shut. Watch Phat Ride PSA on YouTube

Vanity

A commercial which advertises a lipstick called "Lip-Sealer" with the cliché of a model posing with a voice over. Suddenly, the model's lips have been glued shut as she tries to speak but is only able to mumble. Distorted voices are also heard. Watch Vanity PSA on YouTube

The Man

In 2007 Declare Yourself shot another series of PSAs starring Ben Garant and Tom Lennon of Comedy Central's Reno 911!. The series, entitled The Man, featured Ben and Tom posing as "The Man" to encourage young people NOT to vote. The sarcastic series has a following on MySpace TV, YouTube, and Break.

== Bondage print ad campaign ==
To encourage voter registration among youth for the 2008 presidential election, Declare Yourself hired photographers Mark Liddell and David LaChapelle to shoot a bondage-themed print advertising campaign. The ads include models, including celebrities Christina Aguilera, Jonathan Bennett, La Toya London and André 3000, in various forms of bondage as a symbol of reducing one's voice by failing to register as a voter. The photos include the tag, "Only you can silence yourself." The ads drew national media attention, particularly those of actress Jessica Alba, who wears no visible clothing and is bound with black tape over her mouth and chest. Alba said of the advertisement, "It didn't freak me out at all. What I like about Marc's work is that he tells a story and brings real emotion to his pictures."

== Creation of Our Time ==
In March 2011, Declare Yourself combined with the Student Association for Voter Empowerment to become Our Time, a 501(c)(3) membership organization pushing for greater representation of all Americans under 30. Matthew Segal is co-founder and president of OUR TIME.
