= Bob Chapek =

American businessman and media executive (born 1960)

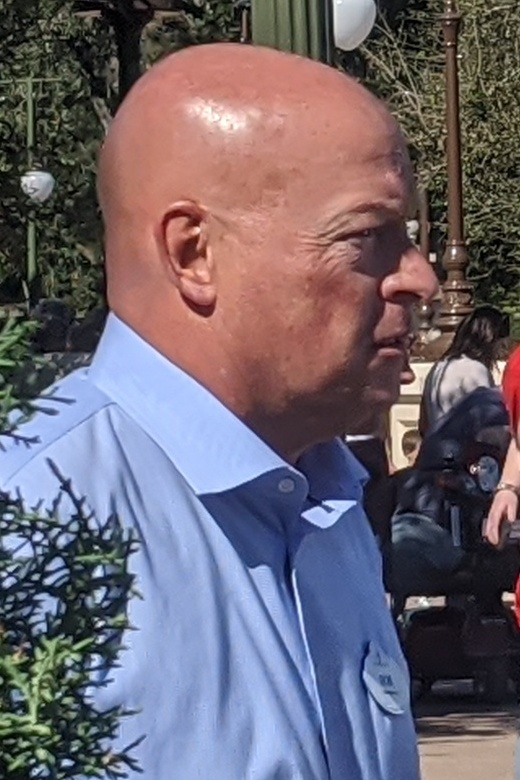
- Chapek in 2020
- Born: Robert Alan Chapek; 1959 (age 66–67); Illinois, U.S.
- Education: Indiana University Bloomington (BS); Michigan State University (MBA)
- Occupation: Businessman
- Years active: 1993–present
- Title: Former CEO of The Walt Disney Company
- Term: February 25, 2020 – November 20, 2022
- Predecessor: Bob Iger
- Successor: Bob Iger
- Board member of: Masimo
- Spouse: Cynthia Ford (m. 1980)
- Children: 3

Robert Alan Chapek (born August 21, 1960) is an American businessman and former media executive who was the chief executive officer (CEO) of the Walt Disney Company from 2020 to 2022. He joined Masimo's board of directors in 2024, resigning from the board in 2025.

Before becoming CEO, Chapek had a 26-year career with The Walt Disney Company, beginning in the Home Entertainment division, and eventually rising to become Chairman of Parks & Resorts. Chapek, who had a controversial tenure as CEO, was dismissed from the position on November 20, 2022, and succeeded by his predecessor, Bob Iger.

== Early life and education ==
Robert Chapek was born in 1960 in a Chicago suburb to Marie (Lofay), who worked at an East Chicago, Indiana insurance agency, and Bernard W. Chapek, an oil refinery machinist in Whiting, Indiana. He grew up living in Robertsdale, Indiana and was an altar boy at St. John the Baptist Catholic Church in Whiting . His father was a World War II veteran and the family went on annual trips to Walt Disney World in Orlando, Florida.

Bob Chapek graduated from George Rogers Clark Jr./Sr. High School in 1977; his entire family have graduated from Clark. He has a Bachelor of Science degree in microbiology from Indiana University Bloomington and a Master of Business Administration degree from Michigan State University in East Lansing.

== Career ==
Chapek worked for the H. J. Heinz Company in brand management and in advertising for J. Walter Thompson before joining the Walt Disney Company in 1993 and working there until 2022. In January 2024 he joined the board of directors of Masimo, a medical technology company.

=== Disney ===
==== Home Entertainment ====
Chapek began his Disney career in 1993 as the marketing director for the company's Buena Vista Home Entertainment division, which at the time was focused on selling VHS films. CEO Michael Eisner said, "He was always an executive that you knew would be on the rise... He knew how to grow the business while adjusting to the changing marketplace, which was intense." Chapek is credited for bringing Disney's home entertainment division into the digital age, by focusing on releasing properties on DVD and later Blu-ray discs. In 2006, he became the president of Buena Vista Home Entertainment and in 2009, he became president of distribution for Walt Disney Studios. His career has been called "the home entertainment industry’s single biggest success story" ascending to the top of Disney while working in its home video division.

==== President of Consumer Products ====
Chapek was appointed president of Disney Consumer Products in September 2011. After the acquisition of Lucasfilm, he integrated Star Wars merchandise into Disney's licensing program, ensuring that Disney became the world's largest licensor of intellectual property. In 2013, Chapek secured a deal with Hasbro, whereby the toy company paid Disney $80 million in royalties to extend the license for Marvel toys and an agreement for Hasbro to pay Disney up to $225 million for the rights to forthcoming Star Wars merchandise.

In 2014, Chapek launched the Disney Imagicademy, which was a suite of numerous tablet and smart-phone apps designed to give children high quality learning games. That was Disney's first full foray into the learning-app market. Chapek said he spearheaded this initiative after numerous parents told his department that they found it difficult to find high quality learning apps out of the thousands that were available online.

==== Parks and Resorts ====
On February 23, 2015, Chapek was named chairman of Walt Disney Parks and Resorts effective that day to replace Thomas O. Staggs, who was promoted to Disney chief operating officer earlier in the month. Chapek immediately began working towards the completion and launch of Shanghai Disneyland in 2016, which hosted over 11 million guests in its first year of operation. The $5.5 billion theme park opened under Chapek's leadership after months of delays, establishing Chapek's strong reputation with Iger and Disney's board. Throughout this process, Iger accompanied Chapek on more than 10 trips to Shanghai, China, observing how Chapek navigated budget issues and construction hurdles. He supervised the completion and launch of Pandora – The World of Avatar at Disney's Animal Kingdom in 2017. Chapek directly managed the construction and opening of the Star Wars: Galaxy's Edge lands at Disneyland and Walt Disney World. Disney said of Galaxy's Edge, "It's the most immersive land we have ever built," citing the themed restaurants, shops and roaming interactive characters. Disney reportedly spent $1 billion on the sprawling 14-acre land in Disneyland in Anaheim, prompting CNN to comment that "Disney spared no expense."

As chairman of Parks and Resorts, Chapek invested over $24 billion into the theme parks, attractions, hotels and cruise ships. The New York Times noted that Chapek's spending was more money than Disney spent in acquiring Pixar, Marvel, and Lucasfilm combined. In the fall of 2017, after Parks and Resorts recorded at 14% increase in operating income, many in the media began to speculate that Chapek would likely succeed Bob Iger as the next Disney CEO.

In March 2018, after a reorganization of divisions in order to prepare for the launch of Disney+, Chapek was given back the consumer products divisions (including the Disney Stores), in addition to his responsibilities for all of the parks and resorts and related experiences. Then, CEO Bob Iger said, "Bob [Chapek] comes to this new role with an impressive record of success at both parks and resorts and consumer products, and he is the perfect leader to run these combined teams." That furthered speculation that Chapek would be Iger's successor.

In August 2019, Chapek announced that he had negotiated a retail collaboration to open 25 mini Disney Store shops within select Target department stores across the United States. Chapek said that people who purchase Disney products were already likely to shop at Target, and the deal gives Disney the opportunity to expand its own footprint beyond traditional shopping malls. The Disney mini-shops are an average of 750 square feet and are located near Target's kids clothing and toy departments. They have more than 450 items including 100+ products previously only available at Disney retail locations. On May 18, 2020, Chapek announced Josh D'Amaro as his successor to the position of chairman of Disney Parks, Experiences and Products.

==== Chief executive officer ====
In February 2020, Bob Iger named Chapek as his hand-picked successor for the role of chief executive officer of the Walt Disney Company. Iger retained creative control and would remain as executive chairman until the end of 2021. That was considered a surprise to many Disney employees, who had seen Kevin Mayer as the heir apparent to Iger. In April 2020, Chapek was elected to the Walt Disney Company's board of directors. Iger reportedly resisted relinquishing power to Chapek from the outset, insisting on keeping his office and calling himself "Big Bob" and Chapek "Little Bob". It was later revealed that while Chapek remained CEO, Iger said he intended to resume control of the company's operational duties for the time being, due to the COVID-19 pandemic.

In numerous interviews with financial news outlets during the pandemic, Chapek said he was focusing on opening Disney's theme parks. In May 2020, Shanghai Disneyland re-opened with limited guest capacity capped at approximately 24,000 visitors per day, pursuant to government regulations. Chapek acknowledged that this was a "baby step", but found the attendance figures encouraging, considering that the limited number of tickets were selling out. Chapek vowed to increase capacity in the weeks to come, albeit in a conservative manner.

Chapek said that upon the reopening of Walt Disney World in July 2020, both employees and guests would be required to take temperature checks, wear face masks, and observe social distancing guidelines. He added that the company would continue to work with local government and healthcare professionals to open the parks responsibly. Also when the parks reopened, the first attraction he would visit would be the Pirates of the Caribbean. In October 2020, Chapek agreed to keep Disney World at only 25% capacity until the CDC issued new guidance, and with regards to reopening Disneyland in Anaheim, California said, "It's not much of a negotiation. It's pretty much a mandate that we stay closed." In March 2021 after California eased COVID-19 restrictions, he said, "Here in California, we're encouraged by the positive trends we're seeing and we're hopeful they'll continue to improve and we'll be able to reopen our Parks to guests with limited capacity by late April." By July 2021, Walt Disney World had officially ended their mask mandate (except while on Disney transportation) and temperature checks, and were operating at higher capacity. In October 2021, Disney ended its free FastPass system. Also in October 2021, fireworks shows at both Walt Disney World and Disneyland returned. Under Chapek's leadership, Disney weathered the COVID-19 pandemic. Revenue for Disney's parks, experiences, and products business more than doubled to $6.7 billion in the first quarter of 2022, compared with the prior-year period.

In October 2020, Chapek spoke of the company's decision to begin focusing on streaming media, including Disney+, and direct-to-consumer advertising. Multiple films which were originally slated for theatrical releases, including Mulan and Soul, did not receive theatrical releases and instead debuted on Disney+. Mulan was offered on Disney+ for a premium fee, while Soul was offered for no additional cost.

==== Florida's Parental Rights in Education Act ====
In 2022 when Florida passed its Parental Rights in Education Act, reports arose that Disney funded the legislators who wrote and sponsored the bill; this conflicted with the company's pro-LGBT+ image. In a board-approved memo drafted with Geoff Morrell, then chief of corporate affairs, Chapek wrote "corporate statements do very little to change outcomes or minds. Instead, they are often weaponized by one side or the other to further divide and inflame. Simply put, they can be counterproductive and undermine more effective ways to achieve change." Chapek's refusal to pause political contributions to legislators who supported the bill and his failure to take a public stance on the legislation was heavily criticized, including by several members of Disney's creative talent. After the criticism, Chapek reversed course, claiming the company was "opposed to the bill from the outset" and would be donating to several LGBT+ organizations. The Human Rights Campaign, an LGBTQ civil rights advocacy group refused funds from Disney until "meaningful action" was taken. The next day, Chapek formally apologized for his prior statements and announced that the company will be ceasing donations to all political parties in Florida while looking to further improve their support for LGBT+ causes. However, that was later considered to be one of the main reasons why the Florida government pushed to repeal the Reedy Creek Improvement Act.

==== Dismissal from Disney ====
In June 2022, Chapek signed a three-year contract extension to remain as Walt Disney Company CEO. However, on Sunday, November 20, 2022, Iger was reinstated as CEO. According to Disney insiders via CNBC, Iger was formally requested to return as CEO on the previous day and Chapek was notified on Sunday night. CNBC later reported that Iger repeatedly undermined and failed to champion his chosen replacement throughout Chapek's tenure as CEO. At the time the board, through chair Susan Arnold, cited Disney's negative earnings report released at the beginning of the month and believed that Iger was "uniquely situated" to lead Disney. It was later revealed that CFO Christine McCarthy "blindsided" Chapek with the company's financial results for the third quarter of 2022.

The New York Times (NYT) further reported that Chapek had a "happy go lucky" demeanor during the conference call held after the November 8 earnings report. Chapek was criticized by the NYT for emphasizing the success of Mickey's Not-So-Scary Halloween Party. Calls for Chapek's removal were highlighted the same day by Mad Money host Jim Cramer, who particularly aimed criticism towards Disney's "balance sheet from hell". Investor Nelson Peltz later attributed the losses to Disney's 2019 acquisition of Fox under Iger.

Chapek's exit package was expected to be worth $23.4 million, including the remainder of his CEO salary at $6.5 million and a pension worth $16.9 million, which was accumulated over his 29-year career at Disney. In May 2023, Chapek and a group of other Disney executives were sued for alleged securities fraud. The suit alleged that they had misled investors about Disney+ subscription numbers to make the service appear more successful than it was. The suit was dismissed by the plaintiffs in October 2023.

In September 2026, Bob Chapek's memoir, Behind the Castle Walls, was released by Simon & Schuster, penned alongside Don Yaeger.

== Personal life ==
Chapek and his wife Cynthia married in 1980 and they have three children, including Marvel Studios producer Brian Chapek, and four grandchildren. Bob and Cynthia Chapek live in Westlake Village, California.

Business positions
Preceded by Bob Iger	Chief Executive Officer of The Walt Disney Company; 2020–2022	Succeeded by Bob Iger
