= Gecko's Garage =

British animated children's television series

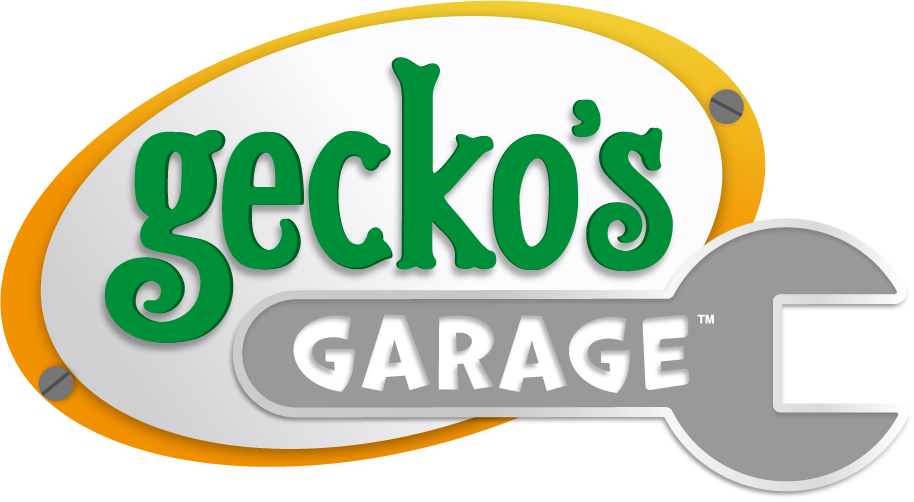
- Genre: Children; Educational
- Created by: Amalie and Christian Hughes
- Country of origin: United Kingdom

Original release
- Network: YouTube
- Release: September 25, 2015

Gecko's Garage is a British animated children's television series about a friendly gecko car mechanic named Gecko who helps vehicles, robots, and others who need a helping hand. In addition to entertaining its target audience of children aged 2–5, it also aims to help children develop cognitive skills such as colours, shapes, and numbers.

Part of YouTube's Toddler Fun Learning channel, the show is presented on YouTube, Peacock, Amazon Prime Video, and other streaming services. Outside of streaming services, Gecko's Garage is also aired by Balikpapan TV and Samarinda TV in East Kalimantan, Indonesia since September 2024, after having previously aired on Mentari TV in 2023.

== History ==
In 2012, husband-and-wife team Amalie and Christian Hughes of Wirral in northwest England, near Liverpool, developed The Toddler Fun Learning channel to host the educational videos they created for their own 2-year-old, with the key series being Gecko's Real Vehicles. In February 2019 Moonbug Entertainment purchased the Toddler Fun Learning channel, including Gecko's Garage.

In July 2021, NBCUniversal's streaming platform Peacock aired the first season of six episodes.

Actor Martin Dickinson performs the voice of Gecko. Before that, Gecko's voice was performed by Christian Hughes.
