= Stevin John =

American children's entertainer

YouTube information
- Channel: Blippi - Educational Videos for Kids
- Years active: 2013–2022
- Genres: Educational & Comedy
- Subscribers: 27 million
- Views: 39 billion
- Last updated: July 20, 2026

Stevin John (born Stephen John Grossman), better known by his alias Blippi, is an American children's entertainer on YouTube, Hulu, Netflix, HBO Max, Peacock and Amazon Prime Video. The Blippi character that John portrays has a childlike, energetic, and curious persona, and is always dressed in a blue and orange beanie cap, blue shirt, orange suspenders, and an orange bow tie.

== Blippi ==
The idea for Blippi came to John after moving back to Ellensburg and witnessing his then two-year-old nephew viewing low-quality videos on YouTube. Blippi has been described as "an adult human man who dresses up in bright clothes and dances around America's deserted soft play centres for the benefit of YouTube". The first Blippi video was published on February 18, 2014, with John starring as Blippi and doing all of the filming, editing and graphics himself on the initial videos. Taking inspiration from children's educators and entertainers before him, such as Mr. Rogers, John wished to portray Blippi as educational but also as thinking and acting as a child would.

The videos garnered a large following with over a billion views on YouTube, and the production staff was expanded to produce videos in Spanish, establish Blippi Toys, and begin offering DVDs and digital downloads. Some parents have criticized the simplistic nature of the character's tone and repetitive songs about things such as garbage trucks, fire trucks, and pizza.

Some social commentators have criticized Blippi. Writing for the magazine Current Affairs, Nathan Robinson criticized the videos for their lack of depth, calling his universe "thin and dull". He contrasted the show's themes and lessons to Mr. Rogers and Sesame Street, preferring the latter two shows.

== Born To Play ==
In January 2025, John and toy industry executive Daniel DeLapa announced the launch of Born To Play, a New Jersey-based toy company, with Delapa serving as chief executive officer and John as partner and chief content officer. The two had previously collaborated for four years through a Blippi licensing deal.

== Early life ==
John grew up on a farm, and has stated that as a child he wished to be a limousine driver and a fighter pilot. John served in the United States Air Force in 2006 and was honorably discharged in 2008.

== Personal life ==
John had a son in 2022, with Alyssa Ingham.

== Steezy Grossman ==
John started making gross-out videos in 2013 under the persona "Steezy Grossman". In a 2013 video, John performed the Harlem Shake on a toilet and defecated on a naked friend. When the video was unearthed by BuzzFeed News in 2019, John said, "at the time, I thought this sort of thing was funny, but really it was stupid and tasteless, and I regret having ever done it." John has used DMCA takedown notices to remove the video from social media and internet search engines.
