= Roosevelt Institute =

American liberal think tank

The Roosevelt Institute
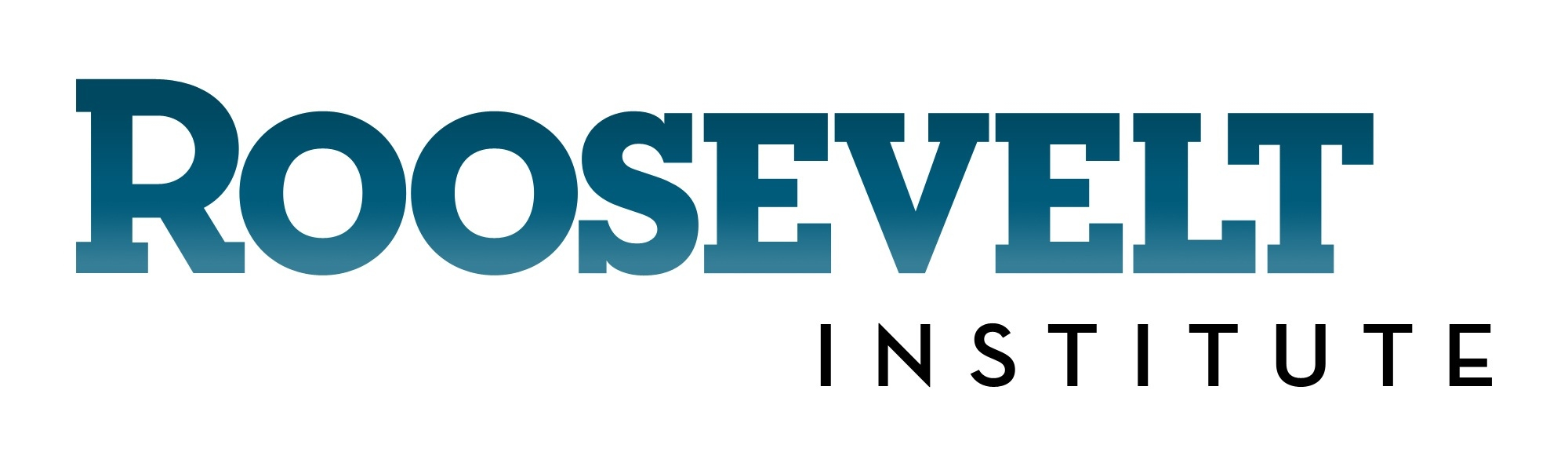
- Established: 1987; 39 years ago
- Chair: Anna Eleanor Roosevelt
- President & CEO: Elizabeth Wilkins
- Staff: 75(2023)
- Budget: Revenue: $22.8 million (2024); Expenses: $14.1 million (2024)
- Address: 570 Lexington Ave., 5th floor New York, NY 10022
- Location: New York, New York
- Website: rooseveltinstitute.org

The Roosevelt Institute is a liberal American think tank headquartered in New York City.

== History and overview ==
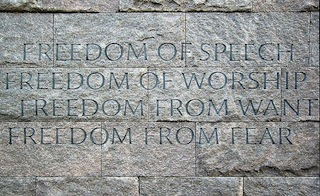
Four Freedoms Wall in the Franklin D. Roosevelt Memorial, Washington, D.C.

The Roosevelt Institute was created in 1987 through the merger of the Eleanor Roosevelt Institute and the Franklin D. Roosevelt Four Freedoms Foundation. In 2007, the Roosevelt Institute merged with the Roosevelt Institution, now known as the Roosevelt Institute Campus Network. It remains the non-profit partner to the government-run Franklin D. Roosevelt Presidential Library and Museum, the nation's first presidential library. In 2009, it expanded its mission with the launch of the Four Freedoms Center, a progressive policy think tank, and an economic policy blog.

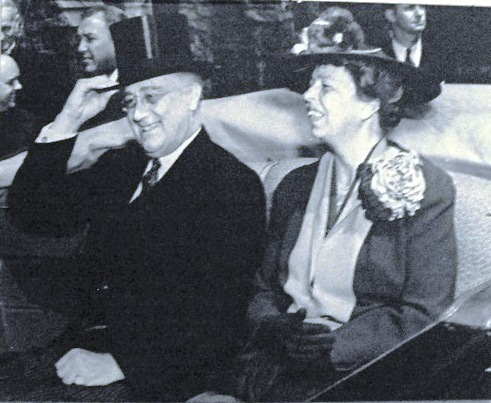
Franklin and Eleanor Roosevelt, November 1935

Felicia Wong, formerly of the Democracy Alliance, became the organization's president and CEO in March 2012.

== Activities ==
Joseph Stiglitz is the Roosevelt Institute's chief economist. In 2015, a report authored by Stiglitz offered an indictment of 35 years of U.S. economic policies. Elizabeth Warren and Bill de Blasio joined Stiglitz at the press conference to announce the report. The 37 policy recommendations in the Stiglitz report include progressive taxation and an expansion of government programs.

Time called the Stiglitz report "a roadmap for what many progressives would like to see happen policy wise over the next four years." According to The Washington Post, the institute's plan is "firmly rooted in the conviction that more government can solve most of America's economic challenges. It is a plan seemingly designed to rally liberals, enrage free-market economists and push a certain presumptive presidential nominee to the left."

== See also ==
- Four Freedoms Award
