= Roosevelt Institute Campus Network =

Progressive organizations in the United States

The Roosevelt Institute Network
- Formation: 2004
- Type: Public policy think tank
- Headquarters: 570 Lexington Ave
- Location: New York City, NY 10022
- Website: www.rooseveltinstitute.org

The Roosevelt Institute's Network, formerly the "Roosevelt Institute Campus Network" and the "Roosevelt Institution", bills itself as the first student-run policy organization in the United States. It is a part of the Roosevelt Institute, an organization focused on carrying forward the legacy of Franklin Delano Roosevelt and Eleanor Roosevelt.

Individual chapters on college campuses conduct research and write policy regarding various public issues. In addition, chapters use Roosevelt's policy positions as a tool for systematic change in local communities across the country. Roosevelt also runs a paid summer internship program, publishes a yearly undergraduate journal series and undertakes state specific policy work.

Roosevelt was founded at Stanford University and Yale University following the 2004 U.S. Presidential Election. Its name is a counterpoint to the conservative Hoover Institution at Stanford.

== History ==
The Roosevelt Institution, now the Roosevelt Institute's Network, was founded in 2004 by disillusioned young progressives seeking a stronger voice in American policy-making. Quinn Wilhelmi, one of the organization's founders, often told students that "the three pillars of politics are money, bodies, and ideas."

Soon after the 2004 election, Kai Stinchcombe was trying to figure out what to do next. He had worked for the Kerry presidential campaign. After the election, he returned to Stanford and emailed a few list-servs suggesting they form a progressive student think tank to fight the influence of Stanford's conservative Hoover Institution. The email soon reached Dar Vanderbeck at Bates College and Jessica Singleton at Middlebury and they responded, proposing that such an organization could exist on campuses across the country.

Stanford grad student John Gedmark responded and was able to get in touch with living members of the Roosevelt family through a contact at the Stanford Law School. The Roosevelt family gave their blessing to use the name and connected them with the Roosevelt Institute, and Gedmark and Stinchcombe filed articles of incorporation in California for a new non-profit organization called "the Roosevelt Institute."

Though Roosevelt's policy model initially favored extended in-depth research, it soon evolved to include more succinct legislative proposals that cater to busy politicians and staffers. In 2006, Roosevelt experimented with narrowing the scope of its agenda by voting on three annual "Roosevelt Challenges": improving socio-economic diversity in higher education, making America work for working families, and increasing energy independence.

In 2007, the Roosevelt Institution merged with the Roosevelt Institute.

There are six national policy centers that are consistent year-to year: defense and diplomacy, economic development, education, equal justice, energy and environment, and health care. Each center has a lead strategist who is responsible for working with individual students on policy ideas, writing preemptive policy analyses on national legislation, and guiding the organization's policy focused initiatives.

As of 2012, Roosevelt ran three concurrent programs: The Washington Academy, The Chicago Academy and The New York City Academy. The Washington Academy placed twenty students at the Roosevelt Institution's national office as well as at organizations such as the Center for American Progress, the Economic Policy Institute, the AFL–CIO, National Security Network, NDN, and Center for Community Change. The Chicago Academy placed ten students with different Chicago City Agencies where they worked on energy and environmental policy in an urban setting.
