= Little Baby Bum =

British nursery rhyme YouTube channel

YouTube information
- Channel: LittleBabyBum
- Years active: 2011–present
- Genre: Entertainment
- Subscribers: 195 million
- Views: 206 billion
- Last updated: March 23, 2024

Little Baby Bum (also known as LBB and LittleBabyBum) is a British children's animated web series created in 2011 by Cannis Holder and her husband, Derek Holder. The show revolves around Mia, a young girl, her family, peers and a group of anthropomorphic characters. The format of the show is 3D animated videos of both traditional nursery rhymes and original kids songs, but with a modern aesthetic, supporting child development of language through song and repetition. It was acquired by Moonbug Entertainment in 2018. The show is available on YouTube, BBC iPlayer, and distributed across SVOD and AVOD players, and over 40 platforms including Netflix, Amazon Prime, and Hulu. Little Baby Bum is available in English, Spanish, Dutch, Brazilian Portuguese, Italian, Russian, Polish, German, French, Mandarin Chinese, Japanese, Filipino and Turkish.

== History ==
Cannis and Derek uploaded their first video, Twinkle Twinkle Little Star, to YouTube on 29 August 2011. on December 30, 2011, they uploaded their second video, Baa Baa Black Sheep, on February 10, 2012 they uploaded their third video, Incy Wincy Spider, and on March 12, 2012 they uploaded their fourth video, was a karaoke version of Twinkle Twinkle Little Star.

Little Baby Bum's popularity increased after the release of its 2nd compilation of videos which was approximately one hour long. To create a one-hour-long video they combined individual videos into long-form videos. The rationale behind this change was so that "parents wouldn't have to keep pressing the play button after each video had finished."

The OpenSlate company published a list of YouTube's 10 most profitable channels of 2014, ranking Little Baby Bum in 4th place with 270 million views and $3.46 million in earnings.

In June 2018, LBB announced an upcoming live show tour in 30 cities throughout the UK.

In September 2018, Little Baby Bum was bought by Moonbug Entertainment for an undisclosed sum. By the time of the purchase, LBB had accumulated 16 million subscribers and about 23 billion views across Netflix, Prime Video, and YouTube.

In April 2020, Moonbug signed a deal with Chinese video platform Xigua Video, to host the show on its platform in China.

== Characters ==
- Mia (voiced by Mila Lieu from 2011-now)
- Jacus (voiced by Shash Hira from 2014-now)
- Pig (voiced by Kit Connor from 2016-now)
- Baa Baa (voiced by Leo Woodall from 2011-now)
- Daisy (voiced by Emma Tate from 2011-now)
- Incy Wincy (voiced by Louis Partridge from 2011-now)
- Infant Giant panda (voiced by Florence Pugh from 2011-now)
- Twinkle (voiced by Millie Bobby Brown from 2011-now)

== Rankings ==
Since 2014 when the video was posted, Little Baby Bum's 54-minute compilation video of Wheels On The Bus | Plus Lots More Nursery Rhymes | 54 Minutes Compilation has had 2.3 billion views and was YouTube's 39th most viewed video of all time. At that time, this video was the most-watched video of all time on YouTube, surpassing Psy's Gangnam Style, and was the first non-music video to reach 1 billion views.

As of April 2016, Wheels On The Bus had attracted over 1.33 billion views. It was officially recognized as the number one educational video by Guinness World Records in 2017.

As of 2018 Little Baby Bum was the world's tenth-largest YouTube channel with 16.5 million subscribers. In 2020 the show attracted over 1.5 billion monthly views and over 80 million subscribers.

== Merchandise ==
LittleBabyBum signed a licensing deal to launch a set of plush toys of its main characters, extracted from the traditional English nursery rhymes, like Incy Wincy Spider and Baa Baa Black Sheep. This deal was signed with Commonwealth Toy, the same company that makes plush versions of Angry Birds, and also distributes products for Care Bears and SpongeBob SquarePants. The plush toys went on general release on 18 May 2016.

Little Baby Bum signed a toy master agreement with MGA Entertainment in August 2020 in which MGAE is the worldwide licensing agent for merchandise based on the animated show.

As of December 2025, Little Baby Bum is the #1 most popular nursery rhyme program to sell its toys & clothes in retail stores like Smyths Toys, The Entertainer, Target, Walmart, Costco, Macy’s, Kohl's and Philippine toy retailer Toy Kingdom.
