= Jay Rasulo =

American business executive

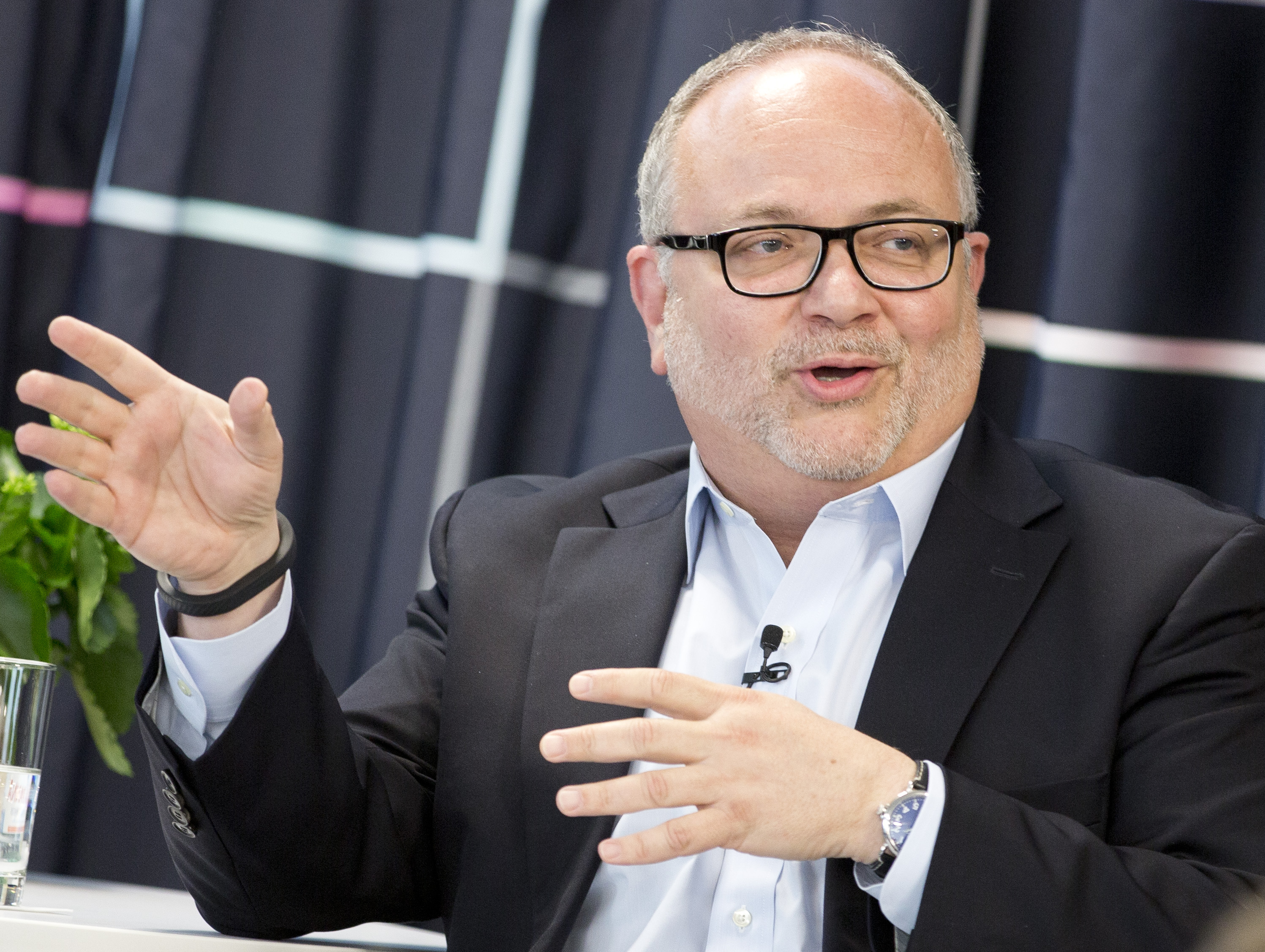
- Rasulo in May 2014
- Born: Staten Island, NY
- Education: Columbia University; University of Chicago

James A. "Jay" Rasulo is an American executive who was the senior executive VP and CFO of The Walt Disney Company.

== Early life and education ==
A native of New York, Rasulo has a degree in economics from Columbia University and an MA in economics and an MBA from the University of Chicago.

== History ==
In his early career, Rasulo worked for Chase Manhattan Bank and the Marriott Corporation.

Rasulo joined The Walt Disney Company in 1986 as a director within Corporate Strategic Planning and later rose to senior vice president, where he led development for Disney's real estate-based businesses. After two years as a senior vice president of Corporate Alliances and three years with Disney Regional Entertainment, Rasulo became executive vice president of Euro Disney S.C.A., which operates Disneyland Resort Paris. He served as president and chief operating officer before taking over as chairman and CEO of the French resort in 2000.

Prior to being appointed CFO, he was chairman of Walt Disney Parks and Resorts from October 2005 until December 2009 when he switched positions with Thomas O. Staggs. He was made the president of the theme park division in September 2002, replacing Paul Pressler.

On June 30, 2015, Christine McCarthy was announced as his successor.

== Boards ==
In 2006 and 2007, Rasulo served as national chair for the Travel Industry Association. He also serves as chair of the U.S. Travel and Tourism Advisory Board, established in 2003 to advise the U.S. Department of Commerce, and is a director on the Department of Homeland Security's Safe Borders / Open Doors Committee.

He serves on the boards of the Los Angeles Philharmonic Orchestra, the French-American Chamber of Commerce and the Los Angeles Jobs and Economy Commission.
