= Candle Media =

American media company

Candle Media, LLC
- Company type: Private
- Industry: Digital media
- Founded: November 1, 2021; 4 years ago
- Founders: Kevin A. Mayer and Thomas O. Staggs
- Headquarters: Los Angeles, California, United States
- Owners: Kevin Mayer and Tom Staggs
- Divisions: Candle Studios (Candle Media's live-action properties)
- Subsidiaries: Moonbug Entertainment (Candle Media's animation operations)
- Website: www.candlemedia.com

Candle Media, LLC is an American media company based in Los Angeles. The company is financially supported by the investment firm Blackstone Inc. and was co-founded by former Disney executives Kevin A. Mayer and Thomas O. Staggs. Candle Media owns the companies Moonbug Entertainment and production company Faraway Road Productions, maker of Israeli thriller series Fauda. They also own a controlling interest in Hello Sunshine, which Hello Sunshine founder Reese Witherspoon retains a minority interest in. It also owns a minority stake in Westbrook Inc., the company founded by Will & Jada Pinkett Smith.

== History ==
Before co-founding Candle Media in 2021, Kevin Mayer and Tom Staggs originally led a blank-check company Forest Road Acquisition Corp.

In August 2021, the company began acquiring content companies starting with Reese Witherspoon’s Hello Sunshine. In November 2021, Candle Media acquired Moonbug Entertainment, a children’s entertainment company that manages properties including CoComelon and Blippi, for nearly $3 billion. In January 2022, the company announced a strategic minority investment in Will Smith and Jada Pinkett Smith’s Westbrook. In the same month, Candle Media also acquired Faraway Road Productions for an estimated $50 million.

In May 2022, Candle Media acquired ATTN:, a social media storytelling company, for $100 million. In the same month, the company also announced that it will acquire Exile Content Studio, a Spanish production studio. To date, Candle Media has spent approximately $4 billion on acquisition deals. The company partnered with Cameo in December 2022 to launch a feature aimed at children that would allow users to share personalized videos of characters from popular children's shows such as CoComelon and Blippi. In 2023, the company hired media executive James Goldston to oversee a new division developing nonfiction television and film productions.

In June 2023, Candle Media entered into a strategic partnership with TikTok, which Mayer had previously served as CEO of. Under the partnership, the company will develop premium content with TikTok. As part of this, Candle Media will develop film, television and audio productions based on works by authors in the BookTok community.

In July 2024, Candle Media reorganized under two divisions. Its live action properties will be placed under Candle Studios, with current Hello Sunshine CEO Sarah Harden being named head of the new division. Animation was folded into subsidiary Moonbug Entertainment.

== Subsidiaries ==
Acquisition date	Subsidiary	Notes
August 2021	Hello Sunshine	
November 2021	Moonbug Entertainment	
January 5, 2022	Westbrook Inc.	minority (10% stakes)
January 12, 2022	Faraway Road Productions	
May 2022	ATTN:	
May 2022	Exile Content Studio	
August 12, 2022	Notables	
