= Our Time (nonprofit) =

American nonprofit organization

- Formation: March 2011
- Purpose: A nationwide non-profit organization that empowers and speaks for the interests of young Americans
- Headquarters: Washington, D.C.
- Members: more than 1,000,000
- Co-Founder and President: Matthew Segal
- Co-Founder and Head of Business Development: Jarrett Moreno
- Website: https://www.ourtime.org

Our Time (corporately styled OurTime.org) was an American organization founded by Matthew Segal and Jarrett Moreno, focused on organizing campaigns that register and educate voters, advocating for economic opportunity, and covering political news aimed at young Americans.

The organization absorbed Declare Yourself and the Student Association for Voter Empowerment, and began operations as a 501(c)(3) in March 2011. The organization says that its positions are based upon its assessment of majority views of the millennial generation.

As of 2025, the organization's website is offline and social media accounts are inactive since 2016. It submitted its last tax filing in 2017.

== History ==
Declare Yourself began during the 2004 presidential elections to encourage young people to register to vote. It began as the "Declaration of Independence Road Trip", a 50-city cross-country tour of a rare Dunlap broadside of the Declaration of Independence lasting three-and-a-half years.

Up to its merger with the Student Association for Voter Empowerment, Declare Yourself registered almost 4 million young people to vote using online tools, on-location efforts, and an Ultimate College Bowl contests.

Founded in 2006, the Student Association for Voter Empowerment was an association of students that worked to bring young Americans into the political process by breaking down barriers to electoral participation and encouraging youth-led policy solutions. The organization's initiatives included attempted Congressional passage of the Student Voter Act and 80 Million Strong for Young American Jobs - a coalition of youth groups to address unemployment issues for young people during the Great Recession.

== Former campaigns ==
In April 2011, Our Time released a petition identifying underrepresentation of 18- to 34-year-olds in national opinion polls. The campaign began in response to CNN poll results on social issues that cited the favor/oppose percentages of this age group as "N/A". "N/A is Not OK" generated a response from CNN who mentioned, "The data for the 18-to-34 age group is listed as 'N/A' in the breakdown of age groups because the sample size was too small for statistically valid analysis." Our Time responded by recommending that the polling industry innovate and adopt new technologies to reach younger Americans.

To address the high youth unemployment rate, Our Time called on the media to focus more attention on the issue, pointing out that the economic issues surrounding the 2011 riots in the Middle East were not dissimilar from the problems facing American youth.

Buy Young offered exclusive deals from companies founded by Americans under 35. The campaign encouraged Americans to purchase products from young companies and support youth job creation. OUR TIME used profits from its Buy Young campaign to fund non-partisan voter registration and consumer education activities.

On July 13, 2011, Our Time convened more than 125 young CEOs and executives in Washington, D.C., at the White House, the Chamber of Commerce and Capitol Hill to launch the campaign and push for greater job creation and economic opportunities for young Americans.

News About You provided, five days a week, headlines about the economy, education, politics, employment, as well as a lifestyles and comedy section.

== Current campaigns ==
Our Time's biggest ongoing campaigns include voter registration, voting reform, and getting money out of politics. Using social media and their online voter registration tool, the organization hopes to engage and register record numbers of young voters for the 2014 election.

Our Time has testified to Congress on the importance of voting reforms. They also released a report in November 2013 with the Advancement Project on the obstacles faced by millennials and young voters of color at the polls. They use social media such as shareable petitions and videos to raise awareness about this issue among young voters.

Our Time frequently reaches out to millennials on social media on the issue of money in politics as well, using petitions, memes, and news summaries. They were one of the many groups that signed the amicus brief in support of the appellee in the McCutcheon et al. v. FEC Supreme Court case.

== Sirius XM Radio show ==
On April 22, 2014, SiriusXM announced the launch of OurTime with Matthew Segal, a six-week series produced by and for Millennial listeners on P.O.T.U.S., the Sirius channel dedicated to the Politics of the United States.
