= Cocomelon =

American YouTube channel for children

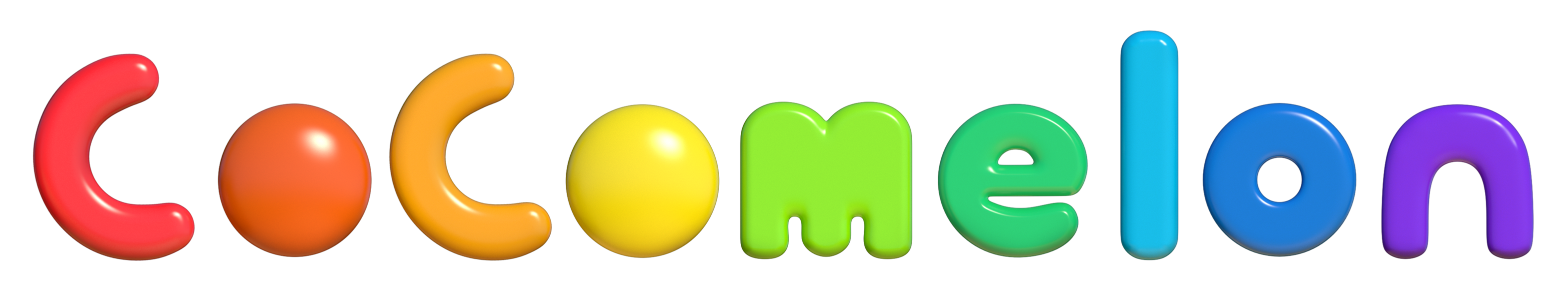

YouTube information
- Channel: Cocomelon - Nursery Rhymes
- Years active: 2006–present
- Genres: Education; nursery rhymes
- Subscribers: 203 million
- Views: 229.91 billion
- Last updated: 16 November 2026

Cocomelon (/koʊkoʊmɛlən/, stylized as CoComelon) is a children's YouTube channel operated by the Candle Media-owned Moonbug Entertainment. The channel specializes in 3D animation videos of nursery rhymes and children's songs. As of April 2026, Cocomelon is the 3rd most-subscribed and 2nd most-viewed channel on YouTube, with over 200 million subscribers and over 220.04 billion views.

The channel launched in September 2006 and was rebranded as Cocomelon in 2018. It has expanded globally in multiple languages, with spinoff series, Netflix TV shows, merchandising, special events, and ongoing product diversification. It was purchased by Candle Media in 2021 for $3 billion. A film about Cocomelon's characters is scheduled to be released in theaters February 19, 2027.

== Characters ==
=== Main ===
- JJ (voiced by Cruze McKinnon) is a curious white boy who wears blue and likes sharks. JJ uses his ladybug light toy to imagine and play pretend with all the Melon Patch Academy kids. JJ is the youngest of the three siblings in his family. He is the show's main protagonist as well the protagonist of the original Cocomelon videos.
- Cody (voiced by Denzel Onaba) is an African-American boy who wears green and likes dinosaurs.
- Cece (voiced by Diana Tsoy) is an Asian-American girl who wears pink and loves to play with cats.
- Nina (voiced by Samantha Alarcón) is a Hispanic girl who wears yellow, likes rabbits, and loves to speak both Spanish and English.
- Bella (voiced by Kaiyus Tiwana Grewal) is a girl who wears purple and likes unicorns.
- Nico (voiced by Sebastian Billingsley-Rodriguez) is a ginger-haired boy who wears red, likes lions, and loves to be loud.
- TomTom (voiced by Dawson Littman) is a boy who enjoys fixing and building things, but is a bit shy and curious around the world. TomTom is JJ's older brother and the oldest of the three siblings.
- YoYo (voiced by Mela Pietropaolo) is a girl who loves spending time with her family and coming up with new games to play, but also enjoys arts and crafts. YoYo is JJ's older sister and the middle of the three siblings.
- Miss Appleberry (voiced by Larissa Dias) is a female teacher at the Melon Patch Academy who teaches ABCs, 123s, shapes, colors, etc.

=== Parents ===
- JJ's Mom (voiced by Meg Roe) is JJ's mother who helps JJ do anything at JJ's house.
- JJ's Dad (voiced by Brian Drummond) is JJ's father who helps the kids get ready for school by using his car.
- JJ's Grandma (voiced by Meg Roe) is JJ's grandmother who is staying home at JJ's house.
- JJ's Grandpa (voiced by Brian Drummond) is JJ's grandfather who is staying home at JJ's house.
- Cody's Mom (voiced by Bethany Brown) is Cody's mother who helps Cody do anything at Cody's house.
- Cody's Dad (voiced by Sam Darkoh) is Cody's father who helps Cody do anything at Cody's house.
- Cece's Mom (voiced by Christine Lee) is Cece's mother who helps Cece do anything at Cece's house.
- Cece's Dad (voiced by Ryan Jinn) is Cece's father who helps Cece do anything at Cece's house.
- Cece's Grandma (voiced by Jean Yoon) is Cece's grandmother who is staying home at Cece's house.
- Cece's Grandpa (voiced by James Yi) is Cece's grandfather who is staying home at Cece's house.
- Nina's Mom (voiced by Gigi Saul Guerrero) is Nina's mother who helps Nina make empanadas for school.
- Nina's Dad (voiced by Donovan Wolf) is Nina's father and pilot who likes airplanes.
- Nina's Grandma (voiced by Claudia Leira) is Nina's grandmother who is staying home at Nina's house.
- Bella's Mom (voiced by Ana Sani) is Bella's mother who stays at home at Bella's house.
- Evan (voiced by Alex Barima) is Bella's father who helps Bella do anything at her house.
- Max (voiced by James Kirk) is Nico's father who helps Nico do anything at his house.

== Content ==
Cocomelon's videos, for a target audience of two- to five-year-olds, feature 3D animated children, adults and animals who interact with each other in daily life. The lyrics appear at the bottom of the screen in the same way on all displays. Formats include standalone music videos, compilations, and livestreams. A blend of live action and animation was introduced in 2024 in one of the shows. "The toddler characters' ages 'stretch' to reflect both the reality and the aspiration of their audience's lives," according to the Cocomelon creative staff. There is a proprietary staff-only guide of about 100 pages detailing the Cocomelon backstory and characters.

== History ==
The YouTube channel was created in September 2006 by Jay Jeon, registered under the name "checkgate", later rebranded to "ABC Kid TV". The channel began by posting educational videos focused on the alphabet. In 2016, it transitioned to 3D animation, with the first 3D video. In 2018, the channel rebranded to Cocomelon, and introduced a recurring cast of characters.

=== checkgate/ThatsMEOnTV.com (2006–2013) ===
On September 1, 2006, Cocomelon was created on YouTube under the username "checkgate", a month before Google acquired YouTube. According to Jeon, it was initially a hobby with his wife, sharing animations that their own kids enjoyed. Two versions of the alphabet song were uploaded on the first day, being titled "ABC Song", and "ABC Song with Cute Ending". A third video was uploaded nine months later, titled "Learning ABC Alphabet – Letter "K" — Kangaroo Game". Most videos on the channel taught the alphabet, with a typical length of between one and two minutes. At the time, the Jeons were operating ThatsMEOnTV.com, an online business that incorporated children's photos into animated educational videos delivered on DVDs. Video titles on the channel were appended with from "www.ThatsMEonTV.com".

=== ABC Kid TV (2013–2018) ===
In 2013, the channel rebranded to "ABC Kid TV" and began remastering older videos, followed by a transition from alphabet videos to nursery rhymes. On April 8, 2016, computer animation was introduced, with the first 3D character appearing in a video for "Twinkle Twinkle Little Star". Later that year, 3D animation videos became longer, some videos used motion capture technology, and uploads became more frequent. Animation and music production continued to become more sophisticated, and a recurring cast of characters formed before the 2018 rebrand.

=== Cocomelon (2018–present) ===
In the summer of 2018, the channel rebranded to Cocomelon, introducing intros and outros for all its videos. The next year, analytics firm Social Blade estimated Cocomelon's monthly YouTube advertising revenue between $638,000 and $10.2 million; The Wall Street Journal estimated annual ad revenue at $120 million.

In early 2020, Jeon granted his first media interview for Bloomberg Businessweek, which ran a profile of the "unassuming mogul" and his business. Jeon, 55 at the time, agreed to the condition that there be no photography and no mention of his wife to preserve their privacy. For most of its history, he and his wife had run the channel primarily on their own, keeping a low profile; their neighbors did not know they owned Cocomelon. For many years, Jeon had avoided expansion by turning down investors, sponsors, language translations, sequels, and merchandising.

In June 2020, Cocomelon launched on Netflix, with three episodes, each about an hour long. Netflix offered access to an audience that did not allow their children to watch YouTube.

In July 2020, Jeon sold his wholly owned company, Treasure Studio, which produced Cocomelon and employed around 20 people, to Moonbug Entertainment, a British firm focused on children's content. According to Moonbug cofounder Rene Rechtman, "Cocomelon has the potential to be the biggest property in the world when it comes to kids. In terms of viewership, it already is." The channel began increasing its reach by securing deals with platforms in South Korea, China, and Europe. By 2021, the channel had expanded its content to include Spanish, Portuguese, Mandarin Chinese, German, and Arabic.

In 2021, Moonbug was acquired for a reported $3 billion by Candle Media. That November, a new show, JJ's Animal Time, also called Cocomelon Animal Time, appeared on YouTube, featuring JJ's favorite animal friends.

In 2022, Netflix began airing Cocomelon as a Netflix Original show. In May, a weekly spin-off show, It's Cody Time, launched on YouTube, featuring the character Cody, JJ's best friend.

On August 1, 2023, Moonbug Entertainment was awarded US$23.4 million in a copyright case against Fuzhou-based company BabyBus, accused of "blatantly copying" Cocomelon videos, including the character of JJ. Later, YouTube removed its channel BabyBus's Super JoJo.

A spinoff series, Nina's Familia, premiered on September 29, 2023, focusing on Latine culture and bilingual content. The Nina Reyes character appeared on Cocomelon in 2019. The show follows the Cocomelon format with educational songs and nursery rhymes. Centered on Nina and her Mexican American family, it was designed for both Spanish-speaking and non-Spanish-speaking children and aims to accurately represent Latino culture. About 70% of the episodes are in English and 30% with some form of Spanish. Development was based in part on focus groups with mothers.

A new original series, Cocomelon Lane, set in the Cocomelon universe, premiered on Netflix on November 17, 2023. The series was described as "a more traditional preschool TV version" of the YouTube channel, narrative- rather than singalong-driven. It was built around a "social-emotional learning curriculum" that focuses on milestone moments for preschoolers, and the accompanying feelings. The series allowed Cocomelon characters to speak directly to the audience for the first time.

A spin-off series, Cocomelon Classroom featuring Ms. Appleberry, premiered on YouTube on September 21, 2024. It is the first live action Cocomelon title, with a blend of live action and animation. Ms. Appleberry, originally an animated Cocomelon character, is played by Juliana Urtubey, who was named the US National Teacher of the Year in 2021. Supported by a learning specialist and a literacy consultant, the weekly show "integrates themes that are essential to early childhood cognitive, social and emotional development".

== Rise in popularity ==
On September 18, 2007, a year after Cocomelon's YouTube launch as checkgate, the channel had seven videos uploaded and 41 subscribers. Two versions of "Cute Alphabet Song from WWW.ThatsMEonTV.com" had 179,970 and 49,292 views; the others had around 1,000 to 20,000 views. By November 14, 2010, there were 1287 subscribers, while views of all videos uploaded to the channel reached over 30 million; "Cute Alphabet Song", renamed "ABC Song from WWW.ThatsMEonTV.com Alphabet Song", had nearly 25 million views. Over the next five years, by October 29, 2015, subscriptions rose to about 750,000, and a 50-minute compilation of previous videos, published on May 1, 2014, had over 244 million views. (Note: Rise in popularity on YouTube: Apr 3, 2008: 187 subscribers. Views for "Cute Alphabet Song" were 1,104,387 and 364,868.; Feb 10, 2009: 511 subscribers. Videos had been reduced to five; one version of "Cute Alphabet Song" had 5,702,390 views, and the other four videos were in the 600,000-800,000 range.; Nov 14, 2010: 1287 subscribers; 30,947,891 total upload views. "Cute Alphabet Song", renamed "ABC Song from WWW.ThatsMEonTV.com Alphabet Song", had 24,963,149 views.; Sep 12, 2011: 5018 subscribers; 66,207,113 upload views. The video, again renamed "ABC Song with Cute Ending," had 44,024,060 views, and videos had been uploaded for each letter of the alphabet, with about 130,000 to 1.8 million views each.; Sep 18, 2012: 16,300 subscribers; 125,577,383 upload views.; Jun 12, 2013: 30,986 subscribers; 151,400,672 upload views. Several videos had well over three million views.; Oct 29, 2014: 313,762 subscribers. Several videos had over 10 million views.; Oct 29, 2015: 748,390 subscribers. A 50-minute compilation of previous videos, published on May 1, 2014, had 244,303,897 views.)

After nine years on YouTube, Cocomelon reached 1 million subscribers on May 16, 2016, and later that month reached 1 billion total views. The channel grew rapidly following the July 2017 release of "Yes Yes" Bedtime Song, in which TomTom uses stuffed animals to get JJ to prepare for bed; "Yes Yes" became Cocomelon's most-viewed video, with over 1 billion views.

In 2018, a YouTube study by Pew Research Center found that "some 81% of all parents with children age 11 or younger let their child watch videos on YouTube", with 34% indicating they do so regularly. Of the 50 most recommended videos found in the study, 11 were "oriented toward small children". Cocomelon's "Bath Song | + More Nursery Rhymes & Kids Songs" was the most recommended video in the research project. (As of September 2020, that video had received over 3.2 billion views on YouTube, making it the 19th-most-viewed video on the site.)

In 2019, Cocomelon had the second-largest YouTube channel subscription gain, adding over 36 million subscribers, ending the year with 67.4 million subscribers. Between May and June 2019, it received 2.5 billion total views, averaging 83 million daily viewers worldwide. It "[dwarfed] the turnout for most of the world's sports leagues, pop stars, and scripted TV." Comparatively, the "major four [American] TV broadcast networks averaged just 13 million viewers daily during the TV season".

After a July 2019 settlement with the United States Federal Trade Commission (FTC), YouTube began implementing major changes to its recommendation algorithm, data collection, and ad targeting for children's content. The changes, along with a $170 million fine, followed a complaint to the FTC under the Children's Online Privacy Protection Act (COPPA). Several children's channels were negatively affected. Cocomelon "dropped from 575 million total views the week before the change, to 436 million the week of, to 307 million the week after, and 282 million the week after that."

In September 2020, Netflix ranked Cocomelon as its third-most-popular show. On December 12, 2020, Cocomelon became the third YouTube channel to get 100 million subscribers. Following predictions that Cocomelon would soon surpass PewDiePie in subscribers, PewDiePie released a diss track titled "Coco" in February 2021. YouTube removed the video for violating its harassment and child safety policies; the audio remains on Spotify. Cocomelon surpassed PewDiePie in April 2021 to become the second-most-subscribed YouTube channel at the time.

As of September 2024, Cocomelon ranked third in YouTube subscriptions, with approximately 182 million subscribers and 1.9 billion monthly views. As of October 2026, it remained third in YouTube subscriptions, with 203 million subscribers, with 1.4 billion monthly views.

== Diversification ==
In 2020, Cocomelon began moving into new product areas, including merchandising and live events. This coincided with the change in YouTube's advertising policies around child-focused content that resulted in an estimated 50-60% revenue loss for the top children's channels. That year, Cocomelon announced a partnership on a line of toys, including plush dolls and toy vehicles, with manufacturer Jazwares, and content deals with Netflix and other streaming platforms.

=== 2021 ===
Cocomelon participated in the Riyadh Season annual festival in Riyadh, Saudi Arabia, collaborating with Spacetoon and the Saudi General Entertainment Authority on Cocomelon Town, open for three months. The Town, set up in five locations, included a replica of the CoComelon house; the Melon Patch Academy, with a variety of learning activities; the Melon Patch Academy Playground; JJ's Grandparent's Farm, with various activities; and the CoComelon Musical Bus.

=== 2022 ===
Cocomelon introduced its spoken-word product, the Cocomelon Story Time podcast, in partnership with Spotify. It features "storybook classics", available in American and British English, Spanish, German, and Brazilian Portuguese. The podcast is available only by subscription to the Spotify Family Plan.

Cocomelon partnered with Falcon's Beyond, a developer of entertainment attractions, on a resort destination in Punta Cana, Dominican Republic. The planned 40,000-to-60,000-square-foot activity area, featuring Cocomelon characters, is one of four attractions in Curiosity Playground, located on Meliá Hotels International property.

=== 2023 ===
A live tour, Cocomelon Party Time, launched in the US in June. The interactive event allowed families to "sing, dance, and play" with Cocomelon characters, including JJ, YoYo, TomTom, Nina, Cody, and Ms. Appleberry. Activities included ring toss, pin-the-tail, and other games; coloring and party hat-making; a light-up dance floor; a simulated hot-air balloon ride; storytelling; a sing-along; and photo opportunities. Tickets were required for everyone aged 12 months and older.

Cocomelon partnered with Cameo, a platform for personalized video messages from celebrities, to offer AI-generated, customized videos featuring the show's main characters. Cocomelon was one of initial group of companies in the launch of Cameo Kids. Unlike the adult celebrity product, the children's videos are created from preset holiday, birthday, and other messages, with a child's name spoken by a character via text-to-speech.

Cocomelon partnered with Puma on a global line of apparel and footwear inspired by the show. The line includes individual sneakers for characters JJ, Nina, and Cody, as well as other items inspired by the show's logo and graphics.

== Broadcast ==
In 2020, Treasure Studio added Cocomelon content to Netflix, Roku, and Hulu. Cocomelon programming aired on Universal Kids from June 21, 2021, until its closure on March 6, 2025, as well as Cartoonito from January 31, 2022, to February 16, 2024. The show aired on Disney Jr. as a short-formed series since August 3, 2026. It has also been broadcast on SAB TV in Pakistan since 29 March 2021, Cartoonito in the United Kingdom from 4 April 2021, Tiny Pop in the UK from 15 November 2021, TV5 in the Philippines as part of Moonbug Kids since September 2022, and Gulli in France since 7 November 2022. Additionally, Cocomelon airs on RTÉ Jr Radio in Ireland. Cocomelon will move to Disney+ beginning on January 1, 2027.

== Film adaptation ==
In May 2025, it was announced that Universal Pictures would distribute a Cocomelon animated film for release on February 19, 2027. It will be produced by DreamWorks Animation, Moonbug Entertainment, Prime Focus Studios, and Flywheel Media, with DNEG Animation providing animation.

== Reception ==
Reviewing the TV series, Common Sense Media rated it appropriate for ages 2 and up and gave it 3 out of 5 stars, noting that it coexists with the YouTube channel. The series "touches on typical preschool themes" and depicts teamwork and mutual support. The characters are "gender-balanced" with a "variety of skin tones, but main toddler JJ and his family are White." Some "inconsistencies" are cited: babies who appear to be about age one sometimes use scissors and usually speak in baby babble, but sometimes speak normally.

In The Guardian, entertainment reporter Stuart Heritage wrote: "Cocomelon is not the sort of thing that holds up to scrutiny well. It's cloying and simplistic and repetitive and ... not designed to be watched by adults at all. ... Some songs ... are genuinely unbearable to endure. But guess what? They're not for you. If you're a preschool child, though, this stuff is like crack. ... The key to Cocomelon's success isn't that it's good ... [it's] that it's just about reliable enough. ... [It is] a series of inoffensive, if slightly unsettling, songs that go on and on and on for long enough to let you sneak off and cook dinner."

== Concerns ==
News media have expressed concern about the channel's anonymous nature and its visually intense content.

A 15 second clip of The Wheels on the Bus contains 6 different camera cuts, all featuring complex movement such as bouncing, spinning, and spontaneous camera movement.

=== Identity of original owners ===
Cocomelon's website has described the company as having 20 employees. When The Wall Street Journal attempted to find out who creates Cocomelon videos, they were unable to contact Treasure Studio, which owns the channel. Wired magazine located a couple in Irvine, California, who seemed to have some ties with Treasure Studio, but was unable to confirm that they owned the channel. In February 2020, Bloomberg Businessweek identified a couple from Orange County, California, as the owners of Treasure Studio and Cocomelon. In mid-2020, Cocomelon was purchased by the children's new media conglomerate Moonbug. In 2022, Moonbug was itself acquired by Candle Media, owned by two former Disney executives.

=== Content ===
Psychologist Mark Travers cited Cocomelon as an example of a children's TV show that may hinder young children's mental development due to its frenetic pacing and overstimulating visuals.

The New York Times has discussed Cocomelon's focus on maintaining children's attention, alleging that a tool named the "Distractatron" - a small television that depicts "banal" live action scenarios such as someone getting a haircut - is used in development to ensure that children are fully engaged with Cocomelon's animation and cannot be distracted. Cocomelon representatives, however, have disputed this statement. Jordy Kaufman, a media researcher who runs the Babylab research facility at the Swinburne University of Technology in Melbourne, Australia, was quoted as saying that the effect of screen time on child development is "a big question without clear answers."

== See also ==
- List of most-subscribed YouTube channels
- List of most-viewed YouTube channels
