= Moonbug Entertainment =

British children's media company

Moonbug Entertainment Limited
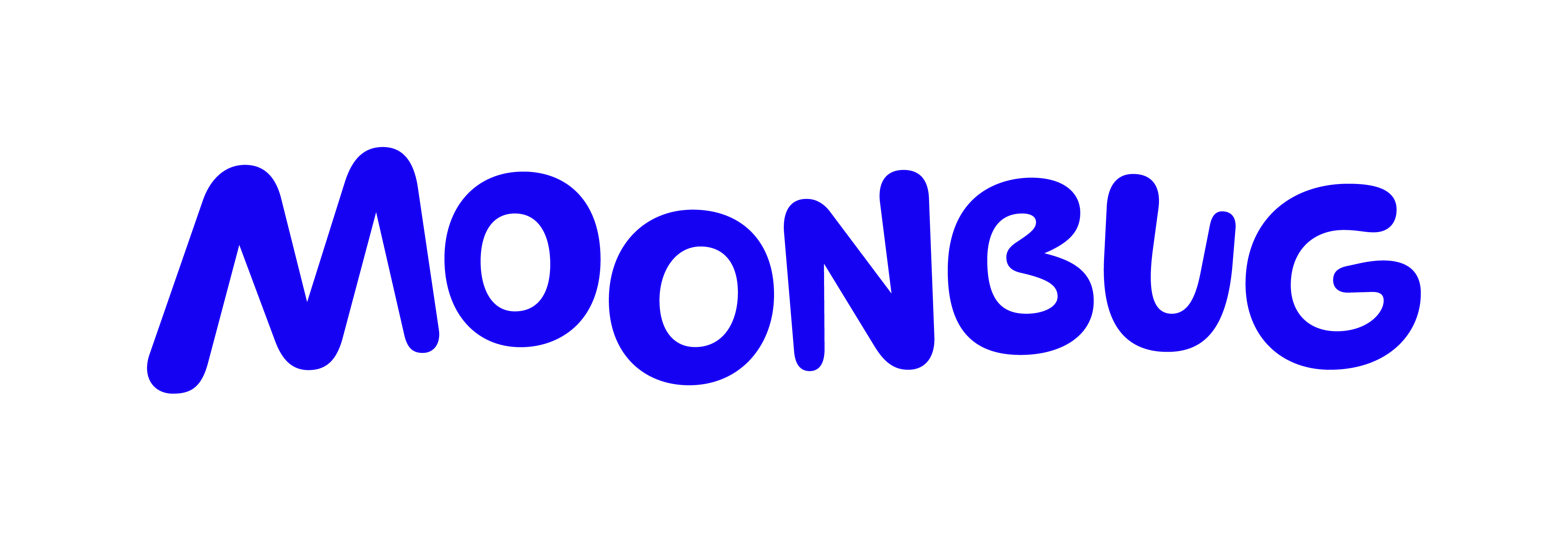
- Logo used since 2023
- Formerly: Project ABC Holdings Limited (February–November 2018)
- Type: Subsidiary
- Industry: Animation studio Media distribution
- Founded: 9 February 2018; 8 years ago in London, England
- Founder: René Rechtman
- Headquarters: London, England, United Kingdom
- Area served: Worldwide
- Key people: René Rechtman (CEO); John Robson (COO); Yitz Shmulewitz (CFO)
- Products: See List of shows
- Revenue: £39.6 million (US$ 53.8 million) (2020)
- Number of employees: ~309 employees (2021)
- Parent: Candle Media
- Subsidiaries: El Bebe Productions Limited
- Website: moonbug.com

Moonbug Entertainment Limited, trading as Moonbug, is a British children's media company and multi-channel network headquartered in London, with an office in Los Angeles. Founded in 2018 and owned by Candle Media, Moonbug creates and distributes children's video and audio content. It is known for managing popular YouTube channels Cocomelon and Little Baby Bum, as well as series such as Mia's Magic Playground, Blippi, and My Magic Pet Morphle.

Moonbug's programming spans animation, live-action, and puppet shows and is available on over 100 platforms in 26 languages.

== History ==
Moonbug Entertainment logo from 2018 until 2023

Moonbug Entertainment was co-founded as Project ABC Holdings Limited on 9 February 2018 by René Rechtman, former President of International at Maker Studios, and John Robson, former Managing Director of WildBrain.

In December 2020, David Levine, former Vice President of Children's Programming for Disney Channels in Europe, was appointed to lead the studio. In November 2021, Moonbug was acquired by Candle Media, led by Kevin Mayer and Tom Staggs, with backing from Blackstone.

In December 2023, the company laid off nearly 30 employees and canceled several shows to focus on Cocomelon and Blippi. Moonbug also planned to explore artificial intelligence and new technologies while emphasizing music and video games. In February 2024, Moonbug shut down its subsidiary One Animation.

On 19 December 2024, one of its co-founders, John Robson left the company.

=== Acquisitions ===
In September 2018, Moonbug acquired the YouTube channel Little Baby Bum for an estimated $9 million. In February 2019, the company acquired My Magic Pet Morphle (formerly Morphle TV), and on 6 August 2019, it acquired Supa Strikas. On 31 July 2020, Moonbug purchased Cocomelon and Blippi together for $120 million.

In February 2020, Moonbug acquired the South Korean animated series Arpo: The Robot for All Kids, which originally aired in 2012 on MBC TV. The series is produced by Canary Islands-based studio 3Doubles Producciones for Moonbug on YouTube.

On 9 February 2022, Moonbug acquired the YouTube network Little Angel. On 24 May 2022, the company acquired Singapore-based media company One Animation, producer of Oddbods and Rob the Robot.

=== Partnerships ===
In April 2020, the company partnered with Chinese video platform Xigua Video to distribute Little Baby Bum in China. Later, in September 2020, Moonbug signed a distribution deal with Tencent Video to feature shows such as Go Buster, Playtime with Twinkle, KiiYii, and The Sharksons. On 18 August 2020, Moonbug launched a Little Baby Bum FAST channel on Pluto TV.

In September 2020, Moonbug Entertainment partnered with United Talent Agency to enhance domestic publishing and video game rights for children's products in North America.

In August 2021, it was announced Universal Music Group (UMG) would oversee distribution, publishing and licensing for Moonbug Music. In May 2023, Moonbug announced a partnership with Audible to launch two new podcast series based on Little Baby Bum and Lellobee City Farm.

== Divisions ==
=== Moonbug Kids ===
Former logo of Moonbug Kids

Moonbug Kids is a multi-channel network owned by Moonbug Entertainment, featuring channels on YouTube, Netflix, Hulu, Roku, Amazon Prime Video, Sky UK, Joyn (Germany), Mediaset (Italy), Cignal and G Sat (Philippines), Astro (Malaysia), and OSN (Middle East). On YouTube, it includes 22 main channels and 12 additional channels in other languages, along with MyGo!, which offers Moonbug content in sign language.

=== El Bebe Productions ===
El Bebe Productions was the original holder for Little Baby Bum’s YouTube channel and its first line of merchandise. El Bebe-era productions and products can be identified by the name in an italic serif font and an illustration featuring the original design of Twinkle the Star. El Bebe was acquired by and became a subsidiary of Moonbug in 2018.

== List of shows ==
Many of Moonbug's shows are available on YouTube and various streaming services. Additionally, Moonbug's version of Arpo: The Robot for All Kids airs on Pakistan's Champion TV, while Cocomelon has been broadcast on Cartoonito in the UK and Ireland since 2021 and on Super RTL in Germany. In 2022, Moonbug signed a deal with WarnerMedia to broadcast several of its shows on Cartoonito in the United States.

=== Original shows ===
- Blippi Wonders (29 September 2021–) (Note: Co-produced with the Italian company Rainbow S.p.A.)
- Cocomelon Lane (17 November 2023–)
- Lellobee City Farm
- Digley & Dazey (Note: Part of Little Baby Bum.) (7 March 2020–)
- Go Buster (2018)
- Mia's Magic Playground (12 November 2020–) (Note: Part of Little Baby Bum per Moonbug Locks in Deals with HBO Max MGA)
- Little Baby Bum: Music Time (25 September 2023–)
- Playtime with Twinkle
- Morphle and the Magic Pets (20 March 2024–)
- The Ring-A-Tangs
- The Sharksons

=== Distributed shows ===
- Antiks
- Arpo: The Robot for All Kids (2 April–2 July 2012, 2019–) (Note: Original version was released by Toonzip on 2012, while the YouTube shorts from 2019 to 2020.)
- Blippi (18 February 2014–)
- Gecko's Garage (25 September 2015–)
- Glove and Boots (2018–2019) (Note: acquired from Bento Box Entertainment)
- Insectibles
- KiiYii
- My Magic Pet Morphle (26 March 2015–) (Note: Originally titled Mila and Her Magic Pet.)
- Oddbods
- Rob the Robot (Note: Originally distributed by Entertainment One)
- Supa Strikas (2010–)
- T-Rex Ranch (Note: Originally titled ToyLabTV.)

=== Shows based on licensed properties ===
- Care Bears: Unlock the Music (Note: Based on Care Bears franchise.) (1 July 2020–)
- Let's Go Cozy Coupe (24 August 2020–)
- Squishville (26 June 2021–)

=== YouTube channels ===
- Cocomelon (Note: Originally titled checkgate, then ThatsMeonTV, and ABC Kid TV.)
- Little Angel
- Little Baby Bum
- Blippi

== Criticism and controversies ==
=== Performing rights ===
In March 2022, The Ivors Academy and the Musicians' Union in the UK and Ireland criticized Moonbug for using "letters of direction" to have composers assign their performing rights royalties to the company.

=== LGBT content ===
In August 2023, an episode of Lellobee featuring a gay couple and their child aired on IndiKids, an in-house channel produced by IndiHome, which sparked outrage in Indonesia. This led to the removal of Moonbug content from IndiHome on 29 August. A similar episode of Lellobee had previously caused controversy in Malaysia in January 2022.
