= Disney Consumer Products =

Retailing and licensing subsidiary of Disney Parks, Experiences and Products

Disney Consumer Products, Inc.
- Type: Subsidiary
- Industry: Merchandising
- Predecessor: Character Merchandising Division
- Founded: 1929; 97 years ago
- Headquarters: Walt Disney Studios, Burbank, California, United States
- Area served: Worldwide
- Key people: Lisa Baldzicki (president)
- Products: Textiles, apparel and luxury goods
- Services: Licensing
- Parent: The Walt Disney Company (1929–2015); Disney Consumer Products and Interactive Media (2015–2018); Disney Experiences (2018–2026); The Walt Disney Studios (2026–present)
- Divisions: Global Products; Disney Retail
- Subsidiaries: Disney Publishing Worldwide
- Website: disneyconnect.com/products/

Disney Consumer Products, Inc. (DCP) is the retail and licensing subsidiary of The Walt Disney Company. Part of the Disney Entertainment business segment, it manages the commercialization of Disney-owned brands and intellectual property.

The Walt Disney Company has consistently ranked as the world's largest licensor by retail sales since License Global began its annual ranking in 1998. In 2025, Disney-branded consumer products generated an estimated $63 billion in global retail sales.

Among its principal brands and franchises are Disney, (Note: Including Walt Disney Pictures, Walt Disney Animation Studios, Disney Television Animation and The Muppets franchise.) Pixar, (Note: Its franchises are also commonly marketed under the Disney brand or the Disney·Pixar label.) Marvel, Star Wars, (Note: A Lucasfilm franchise marketed as one of Disney's principal brands.) and National Geographic. Other brands and properties represented through Disney Consumer Products include Disney Parks, Lucasfilm and 20th Century Studios. (Note: Including properties from 20th Century Studios and its related units.)

DCP operated as a standalone business segment until 2016, when it became part of Disney Consumer Products and Interactive Media, before being incorporated into Disney's parks and experiences organization in 2018. In 2026, it was transferred to Disney Entertainment.

== History ==
DCP's origins trace back to 1929, when Walt Disney licensed the image of Mickey Mouse for use on children's books. (Note: "1929". sources: *The Disney Touch, by Ron Grover, 1991. *The Musical World of Walt Disney, by David Tietyen, 1990. Page 19. Walt Disney - An American Original, by Bob Thomas, 1994. Page 106. *Disney Discourse - Producing the Magic Kingdom, by Eric Smoodin, 1994. Page 205. *Walt Disney's Mickey Mouse - His Life and Times, by Richard Holliss, 1986. Page 72. *Building a Company - Roy O. Disney and the Creation of an Entertainment Empire, by Bob Thomas, 1998. Page 67.) On December 16 of that year, Walt Disney Productions formed the Walt Disney Enterprises (WDE) division to handle merchandising. (Note: "1929". sources: *Walt Disney's Mickey Mouse - His Life and Times, by Richard Holliss, 1986. Page 72. *Disneyana: Walt Disney Collectibles, by Cecil Munsey, 1974. Page 31.)

The Mickey Mouse doll production by Charlotte Clark started shortly after in January 1930. (Note: "1930". sources: The Disney Studio Story, by Richard Holliss and Brian Sibley, 1988. Disney Discourse - Producing the Magic Kingdom, by Eric Smoodin, 1994. Page 205.) The WDE division also hired George Borgfeldt & Company of New York as a licensing agent to make Mickey and Minnie Mouse toys. (Note: "1930". Sources: *Walt Disney - An American Original, by Bob Thomas, 1994. Page 106. Disney Discourse - Producing the Magic Kingdom, by Eric Smoodin, 1994. Page. 73. *Disneyana: Walt Disney Collectibles, by Cecil Munsey, 1974. Page 39. *Walt Disney's Mickey Mouse - His Life and Times, by Richard Holliss, 1986. Page 73. Building a Company - Roy O. Disney and the Creation of an Entertainment Empire, by Bob Thomas, 1998. Page 68.) Borgfeldt & Company in turn set to work developing other products, granting the first license to Walkburger, Tanner and Company of St. Gall, Switzerland, for Mickey and Minnie Mouse handkerchiefs. (Note: "1930". sources: *Walt Disney's Mickey Mouse - His Life and Times, by Richard Holliss, 1986. Page 73. *Disneyana: Walt Disney Collectibles, by Cecil Munsey, 1974. Page 39.) That summer of 1930, Disney expanded WDE to England, granting a general license to William Banks Levy for Mickey and Minnie Mouse merchandise. (Note: "1930". source: Disneyana: Walt Disney Collectibles, by Cecil Munsey, 1974. Page 81.)

In 1932 Disney closed a merchandising contract with Herman "Kay" Kamen for sole representation. (Note: "1932". sources: *Walt Disney - An American Original, by Bob Thomas, 1994. Page 107. *Disneyana: Walt Disney Collectibles, by Cecil Munsey, 1974. Page 108. *Building a Company - Roy O. Disney and the Creation of Green tape, by Bobbi Thomas, 1998. Page 70. *Walt Disney - The Triumph of the American Imagination, by Neal Gabler, 2006. Page 197.) Early on WDE began to show results. The company's merchandising made the Silly Symphony film Three Little Pigs (1933) its first profit-making animated film. (Note: "1933". sources: *Walt Disney's World of Fantasy, by Adrian Bailey, 1987. *Microsoft Cinemania '95, 1994. *Of Mice and Magic, by Leonard Maltin, 1980. *Walt Disney - Hollywood's Dark Prince, by Marc Eliot, 1993. Page 76. *Disney's World, by Leonard Mosley, 1985. Page 139. *The Disney Studio Story, by Richard Holliss and Brian Sibley, 2010. *The Hollywood Studios, by Roy Pickard, 1978. Page 240. *Walt Disney - When Dreams Come True, by JoAnn DiFranco, 1985. Page 29. *Encyclopedia of Walt Disney's Animated Characters, by John Grant, 1987. Page 55. *Disneyana: Walt Disney Collectibles, by Cecil Munsey, 1974. Page 109. *Disney A to Z - The Updated Official Encyclopedia, by Dave Smith, 1998. Page 553. *Walt Disney - The Triumph of the American Imagination, by Neal Gabler, 2006. Page 185.)

In 1934, Disney's licensing expanded to hand-crank toy projectors, (Note: "1934". source: Disney Magazine, Spring 2001. Page 80.) diamond-studded Mickey Mouse pins, Mickey Mouse toffee in England (Note: "1934". source: Walt Disney's Mickey Mouse - His Life and Times, by Richard Holliss, 1986. Page 76.) and a Lionel wind-up train toy, (Note: "1934". sources:*Walt Disney's Mickey Mouse - His Life and Times, by Richard Holliss, 1986. Page 76. *Disneyana: Walt Disney Collectibles, by Cecil Munsey, 1974. Page 127. Walt Disney's Railroad Story, by Michael Broggie, 1997. Page 41.) while a patent is received for Ingersoll-Waterbury Clock Company's Mickey Mouse watch. (Note: "1934". sources: Disneyana: Walt Disney Collectibles, by Cecil Munsey, 1974. Page 116.)

More companies licensed the Mickey Mouse image. General Foods did so for one year and made $1.5 million on the Post Toasties cereal box. Mickey was the first licensed character on such a product. (Note: "1934". Source: Disney Magazine, Summer 1997. Page 46.) Clashes with other companies weren't unavoidable, though. Disney filed suit on July 31 against the United Biscuit Company of America, Sawyer Biscuit Company, and the Chicago Carton Company for unauthorized use of Disney characters for animal crackers which lasted for four months and ended in Disney's favor. (Note: "1934". source: Disneyana: Walt Disney Collectibles, by Cecil Munsey, 1974. Page 273.)

Disney signed with Courvoisier Galleries on July 19, 1938, making the latter company Disney's original art marketing representative. In December, Walt Disney Enterprises was renamed Walt Disney Productions. (Note: "1938". source: Disneyana: Walt Disney Collectibles, by Cecil Munsey, 1974. page 186.)

In October 1948, Disney and Kay Kamen extended the merchandising contract, but only for the Americas. (Note: "1948". source: Disneyana: Walt Disney Collectibles, by Cecil Munsey, 1974. Page 237.) In 1949, the Character Merchandising Division is formed with in Disney. (Note: "1949". source: Disneyana: Walt Disney Collectibles, by Cecil Munsey, 1974. Page 250.) Also that year on October 28, Kay Kamen, Disney's licensing representative, died in an Air France plane crash over the Azores. (Note: "1949". source: The Disney Studio Story, by Richard Holliss and Brian Sibley, 1988. Disney's World, by Leonard Mosley, 1985. Page 153. *Disneyana: Walt Disney Collectibles, by Cecil Munsey, 1974. Page 237. *Asiaweek, November 12, 1999, Volume 25, Number 45. Page 48. * Walt Disney - The Triumph of the American Imagination, by Neal Gabler, 2006. Page 473.)

With Roy Disney splitting the merchandising division from Walt Disney Productions, Jimmy Johnson became head of the merchandising division's publication department in 1950 and took on managing business affairs for the Walt Disney Music Company.

Disney had a food division with products from bread to soft drinks, which was mostly discontinued due to its contract with ABC to produce TV shows and the need not to be in competition with potential advertisers.

After Disney purchased the rights for Winnie the Pooh to make a 1966 animated short film, the company conceded to a broad licensing agreement with Sears, Roebuck & Co. Stephen Slesinger Inc.'s Pati Slesinger found merchandise that Disney did not pay royalties on. Slesinger then attempted to get the A.A. Milne Trust to abrogate its contract. In 1983, Disney paid Stephen Slesinger Inc. and the Milne estate to end the royalty issue and agreed to a new contract that lowered Slesinger Inc.'s royalty percentage.

In 1979, the Intergovernmental Philatelic Corporation of New York was licensed by Walt Disney Productions to make Disney character stamps for several countries. (Note: "1979". source: Walt Disney's Mickey Mouse - His Life and Times, by Richard Holliss, 1986. Page 89.)

=== DCP history ===
Disney Consumer Products was formed in 1985 under Barton K. "Bo" Boyd and incorporated with the State of California in 1986.

The first Disney Store opened in Glendale, California on March 28, 1987. (Note: "1987". source: * Prince of the Magic Kingdom, by Joe Flower, 1991. *Work in Progress, by Michael Eisner, 1998. Page 243.) On October 12, Disney agreed to a licensing contract with Mattel for a Disney Character infant and preschool toy line. (Note: "1987". source: The New York Times, October 13, 1987. Page D26.) DCP purchased Childcraft Education Corp., makers of children's furniture and equipment and owners of retail stores and catalog sales, from Grolier Inc. in April 1988.

In April 1990, the 50th store was opened in Montclair, California along with the first Mickey's Kitchen fast food restaurant. On November 11, 1991, Mattel and Disney extended the 1987 agreement, adding Pinocchio, Bambi, Dumbo, It's a Small World, and Autopia to the toy line. (Note: "July to December 1991". source: The New York Times, November 12, 1991. Page D4.) In March 1992, Disney Stores closed two Mickey's Kitchens as the restaurants were only breaking even while well received by the customers as the company wanted to focus on overseas expansions.

In 1994, DCP ended an exclusive licensing agreement with Sears for Winnie the Pooh. Three distinct product lines were created for Pooh: Disney Pooh, based on the Disney red-shirted tan bear cartoon version; 100 Acre Collection, a more upscale line for department stores and the Classic Pooh line based on the original A.A. Milne books' Ernest H. Shephard illustrations.

DCP licensing peak in 1997 with 749 Disney Stores worldwide, operating income of $893 million and 4,200 licensees for mostly Winnie the Pooh and Mickey Mouse products plus some popular animated movies. Disney's and McDonald's ten-year cross-promotional agreement began on January 1, 1997. In May 1997, the Vermont Teddy Bear Co. filed a copyright infringement suit against Disney over "Pooh-Grams" being similar to its mail-order "Bear-Gram" trademark and logo. Also, Disney Enterprises, Inc. sold DCP operating subsidiary Childcraft Education Corp. to U.S. Office Products Co. In July 1997, Boyd was named chairman of DCP with Canada and US head Anne Osberg was promoted to president, DCP. As president, Osberg also oversaw Disney Stores, Walt Disney Records and Disney Interactive.

In March 1998, Walt Disney Records and Disney Music Publishing were transferred out of DCP to Buena Vista Music Group in the Disney studio division. By 1998, Pooh outsold Mickey Mouse $316 million to $114 million through November of that year in just-licensed-toy sales. By replacing Sears with 100 licensees including Mattel, Hallmark, Timex, Tupperware and Royal Daulton, DCP has since increased Pooh product lines from $390 million to $3.3 billion.

=== Franchise focus ===
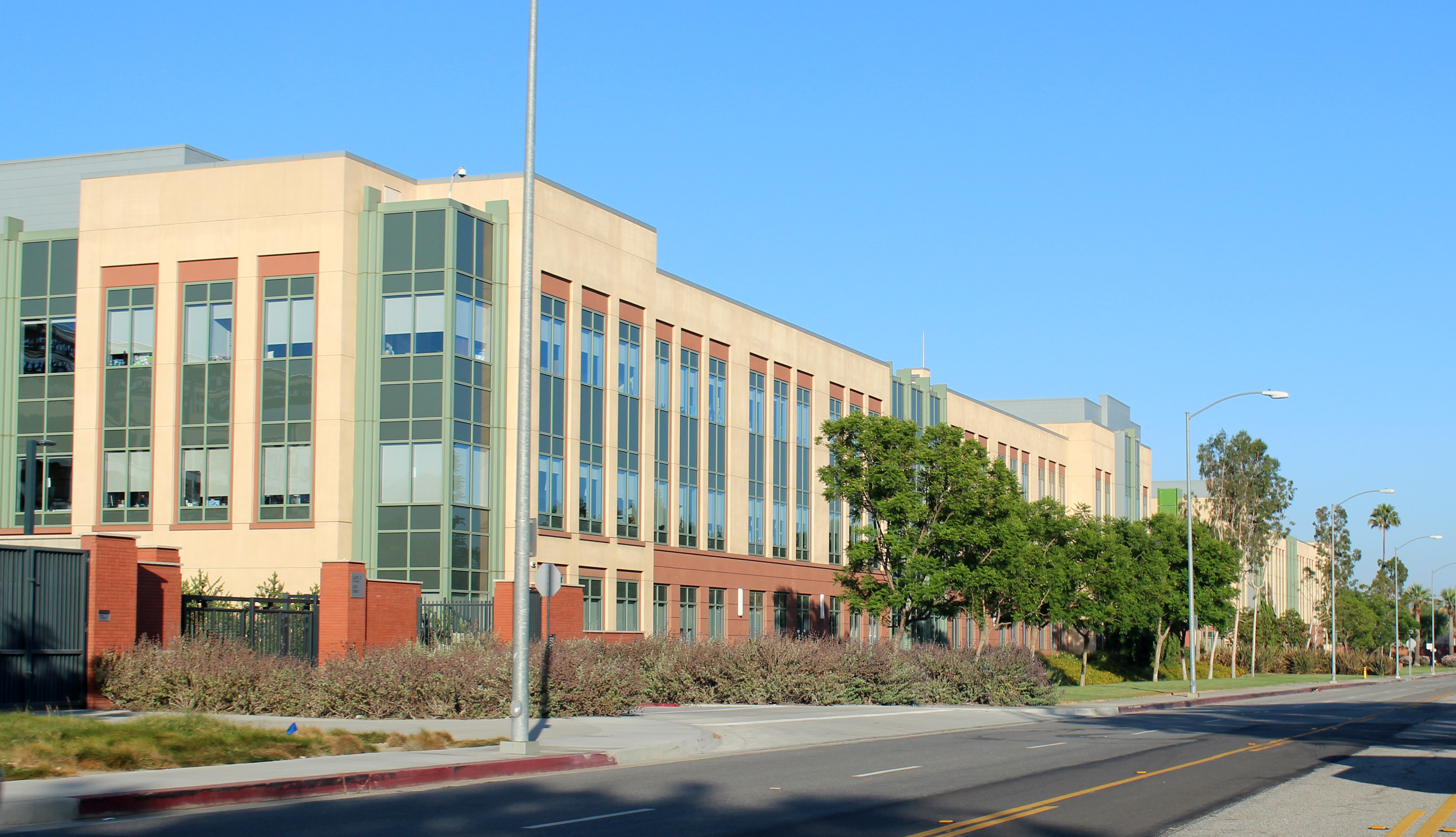
DCP office buildings in Glendale at Disney's Grand Central Creative Campus

With Mickey Mouse and other characters on products everywhere and a general retail decline in 2000, DCP had registered operating income of only $386 million. In mid-December 1999, Andrew P. Mooney became the president of DCP under Chairman Boyd in a general shake up of the unit. He created the Disney Princess franchise in January 2000. He also developed the Disney Couture fashion line, Walt Disney Signature furniture, a princess-inspired bridal gowns line, and lines based on the Pixar films, Toy Story and Cars. Mooney had DCP try an Always Fresh labeled women's nightshirts and T-shirts line which attempt to be more mature but failed. He also reduced the number of licensees in half, sold low sale stores and had staff actively pursuing licensing partners than waiting for proposals. For example, Mooney, worked to have Fred Segal, a high-end retailers, sell specialty products and opened a sales office near Walmart's headquarters in Bentonville, Arkansas. In 2001, Mooney led a promotion of Mickey Mouse T-shirts by getting them into the hands of celebrities, which was a success. Also, Disney Publishing issued its first original comic book, W.I.T.C.H., which was successful enough to be adapted into an animated series.

Consumer Products also began expanding licensing in the food category in the 2000s. DCP agreed to a licensing agreement with Kellogg Company for a Kellogg's Disney cereal line launched in February 2002; Kellogg's Disney Mickey's Magix, Kellogg's Disney Hunny Bs, and Kellogg's Disney/Pixar Buzz Blasts. In May 2003, DCP and Wells' Dairy launched a Disney-branded dairy line with a variety of new ice creams, frozen novelties and yogurt products. In May 2005, DCP licensed Krogers the Old Yeller name to sell dog food.

The Japanese stores were sold to Oriental Land Company in 2002, while most North American stores were sold and licensed in November 2004 to The Children's Place. Disney licensed Motorola for cordless phones and two way handset radios in August 2002.

For the first 3 quarters of 2004, Disney Consumer Products made $388 million in operating income placing the year ahead of 2000 and 2003. In May 2004, the Disney Cuties design (a more anime style) line was introduced with T-shirts. Mooney's major initiatives was to turn Disney into a lifestyle brand by relying on the Disney brand reputation instead of its characters to sell clothing and household goods with half the royalty percentage of the 10% for Disney characters. At Fred Segal in August, the retailer was test selling Snap watches, with swappable faces and wristbands, with Disney characters with hipper, urban designs. In Spring 2005, DCP planned to start sell pants and jean jackets under the Disney Denim brand with a cartoon whimsical elements. On August 5, 2004, the Disney Dream Desk PC, designed by Frog Design and manufactured by Medion, began being sold at CompUSA and Disney online. DCP planned to release a camcorder and digital camera later in the year.

Disney purchased the rights to The Muppets and the Bear in the Big Blue House franchises from The Jim Henson Company on February 17, 2004. The two brands were placed under control of the Muppets Holding Company, LLC, then as a unit of Disney Consumer Products.

In 2005, DCP has begun working with various Indian retail outlets to establish Disney Corners within the outlets to sell licensed merchandise. Also that year, Mooney formed the Disney Fairies franchise which launched in the fall with the Fairy Dust and the Quest for the Egg book. In the early 2000s, Disneytoon Studios (DTS) joined DCP as their internal Disney conglomerate video partner in developing the new Disney franchises. While DCP eyed other potential franchises, DTS looked to the Seven Dwarfs for a male centric franchise to counterbalance the female centric Fairies by 2005.

In 2006, the Muppets Holding Company was transferred from the Disney Consumer Products unit to The Walt Disney Studios with studio executives passing on oversight, the unit was placed in the special events group. With Disney Princesses a success and Disney Fairies just under way in 2006, Consumer Products started looking into the next possible franchises with Disney Bunnies selected already. DCP concluded a consumer products master licensing agreement for Indochina, including Vietnam, Cambodia and Laos in May, with East Media Holdings Inc.'s EMHI Licensing Inc. On September 26, the Disney Jeans brand was launched in India under license to Indus Clothing, who planned to open 30 Disney Jean stores by the end of 2007. In October, DCP India licensed the rights to Ravi Jaipuria Corporation for five years to set up 150 Disney Artist brand stores and wholesales under the Disney Artist brand, which sold Disney character-branded greeting cards, stationery, arts, crafts and party products in India, Nepal, Sri Lanka, Bangladesh and Maldives.

In January 2007 two new DCP franchises were launched, Disney Bunnies and Disney Dragonkind.

In 2008, Disney purchased back its Disney Stores from The Children's Place. On June 5, 2008, Disney Interactive Studios is transferred out of DCP to the Disney Interactive Media Group.

John Lasseter of Pixar became a creative advisor to DCP in 2009 after already assisting on Cars products. Lasseter pushed for an end to "label slapping", which is using a popular IP to sell unrelated generic toys. The Disney Princesses franchise has generated more than $4 billion in retail sales worldwide. In post-Christmas 2009, Disney Pook-A-Looz, a plush line of Disney caricatures, was launched with its first set at Toy'R'Us with Disney Stores receiving them in mid-March 2010 with the Cheshire Cat selling well. The Muppets were considered the best sellers of the second set of Pook-A-Looz over the expected “Nightmare Before Christmas” characters.

In 2009, Disney acquired Marvel Entertainment for $4.24 billion. Josh Silverman, a senior executive at Marvel, was appointed Executive Vice President of Global Licensing for Disney Consumer Products and helped facilitate the Disney-Marvel integration. In 2011, Disney fired Marvel Studios' marketing department, taking over marketing of their films beginning with the 2012 film The Avengers.

The Cars sequel was approved for a 2011 debut despite the original being panned by the critics and one of the lowest grossing Pixar films as its licensed products have done well. Mooney stepped down as DCP chair in September 2011. With Robert Chapek being appointed president of DCP, DCP expanded its responsibility to include all retailing, distribution and licensing for Marvel, Pixar, video discs and video games.

Swampy the Alligator from Where's My Water? was the first Disney Interactive Media Group original character to get the merchandising treatment by 2012. In 2012, Disney was the world's largest licensor and number 1 in the entertainment category according to the International Licensing Industry Merchandisers' Association for another year with an 80% market share and $39.5 billion.

In March 2013, Disney sent a letter to its suppliers to have them pull any Disney branded products out of the five "highest-risk countries" by April 2014: Bangladesh, Ecuador, Venezuela, Belarus and Pakistan, based on a World Bank-governed metric report. This was announced in May after a Bangladeshi factory building collapsed. Haiti and Cambodia, which are also low-ranking countries, were allowable per Disney's new policy so long as the factories worked with the Better Work health and safety program run by the International Labour Organization and the International Finance Corporation. Bangladesh factories were liable to get work if they also partnered with the Better Work program. Disney also stated that less than 1% of its products were sourced from Bangladesh and even less from the other four countries.

DCP began representing Lucasfilm brand and its franchises, including its Star Wars media franchise as an independent brand, in June 2013. With the addition of Star Wars, Disney has six of the top 10 franchises: Disney Princess (1st), Star Wars (2nd), Winnie the Pooh (3rd), Cars (4th), Mickey & Friends (6th), and Toy Story (8th), with two more in the top twenty; Disney Fairies (11th) and Spider-Man (16th). In October, DCP announced an arrangement with Wet Seal for an ABC Family character inspired Crush by ABC Family apparel and accessories line to reach the shelves in 2014.

In April 2014, DCP was the subject of online criticism from numerous parents (through the Disney Store's Facebook page and other forums) for severely underestimating consumer demand of merchandise related to Disney Animation's 2013 blockbuster hit, Frozen. DCP saw its profit increase by 22% for the 2014 year.

On February 23, 2015, Robert Chapek was named chairman of Walt Disney Parks and Resorts, effective that day. Leslie Ferraro, formerly executive vice president of global marketing, sales and travel operations of Walt Disney Parks and Resorts, was named president of DCP.

=== Merged segments ===
Disney Consumer Products and Interactive Media was formed in June 2015 as merger of Disney Consumer Products and Disney Interactive. The presidents of DCP and DIM were appointed co-chairs of the division while retaining the presidency of their subsidiary while Disney Publishing Worldwide would report to them as co-chairs. The units were brought together due to increase use of technology on the part of DCP with the announced Playmation toy system and digital publishing by DPW.

With the dismantling of Disney Consumer Products and Interactive Media segment in March 2018, many of the consumer products units were moved under the Disney Parks, Experiences and Products segment. Ken Potrock was appointed as president of consumer products in May 2018. The elevation of Parks, Experiences and Products chairman Bob Chapek to Disney Company CEO caused a cascade of promotions and reassignments in May 2020 with Potrock becoming president of Disneyland Resort with Kareem Daniel moved from president of Walt Disney Imagineering Operations/product creation/publishing/games to president of consumer products, games and publishing.

=== 2026 reorganization ===
On August 4, 2026, it was announced that the majority of Disney Consumer Products would move from Disney Experiences to Disney Entertainment. The transition took effect on October 4, 2026, with DCP's global licensing and publishing businesses moving under Disney Entertainment, while Disney Parks Merchandise, Disney Store, and DisneyStore.com remained part of Disney Experiences.

== Disney Consumer Products and Interactive Media ==
Disney Consumer Products and Interactive Media, Inc.
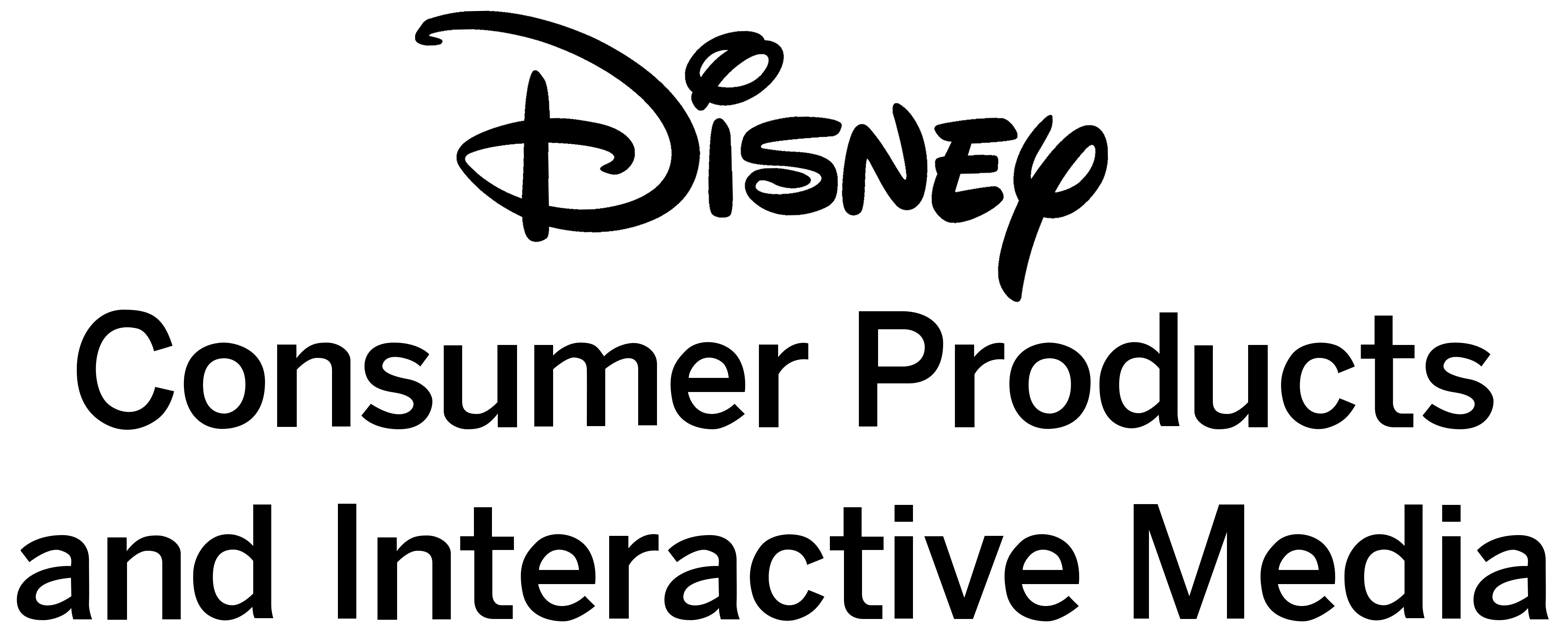
- Type: Subsidiary
- Industry: Merchandising; Publishing; Video Games
- Predecessor: Disney Consumer Products; Disney Interactive
- Founded: 25 March 2015; 11 years ago
- Defunct: 14 March 2018; 8 years ago
- Fate: Merged with Disney Experiences
- Successor: Disney Experiences
- Headquarters: Burbank, California, United States
- Key people: James Pitaro (chairman)
- Products: Books
- Production output: Digital content; Video games
- Services: Licensing
- Parent: The Walt Disney Company
- Divisions: Disney Licensing; Disney Retail; DCPI Games & Apps; DCPI Publishing and Digital Media
- Subsidiaries: Disney Publishing Worldwide; Disney Store; Disney Interactive; The Muppets Studio
- Website: dcpi.disney.com

Disney Consumer Products and Interactive Media (DCPI), was a segment and subsidiary of the Walt Disney Company that engaged in merchandising of the Disney brand and Disney properties through licensing, retail, video games, digital applications and content divisions. The company was formed as a result of the merger between Disney Consumer Products and Disney Interactive.

=== DCPIMedia history ===
Disney Consumer Products and Interactive Media was formed in June 2015 as merger of Disney Consumer Products and Disney Interactive. The presidents of DCP and DIM were appointed co-chairs of the division while retaining the presidency of their subsidiary while Disney Publishing Worldwide would report to them as co-chairs. The units were brought together due to increase use of technology on the part of DCP with the announced Playmation toy system and digital publishing by DPW.

In 2014, The Muppets Studio was transferred and ended up as a part of the newly formed DCPI Labs unit. On January 11, 2016, Maker Studios was placed under the control of Disney Interactive, concurrent with the appointment of Courtney Holt as Maker Studios head with the title of executive vice president.

Ferraro left Disney eight months later in February 2016 with James Pitaro becoming sole chairman. Disney Co/Op team was formed in 2015 to work with licensees and other partners for branded content like Disney Boxed (the reverse concept of Unboxing) with Hasbro about creating a toy.

Content & Media department was formed under executive vice president Andrew Sugerman in early 2016 from Disney Publishing Worldwide, Disney LOL, Oh My Disney and other units. Maker Studios was transferred into DCPI Content and Media in December 2016 while former moved to Disney's corporate strategy unit as executive vice president of media and strategy. Disney Digital Network was formed by the May 2, 2017 by Disney's Digital Content NewFronts with Maker Studios, the former Disney Online websites, StarWars.com and other digital first content units.

DCPI moved to address three issues for all franchises, expanding the audience, category expansion & product development and direct-to-consumer. With Marvel and Star Wars, DCPI planned to push into the female audience. With Star Wars, DCPI partnered with Lucasfilm Animation for Star Wars Forces of Destiny which features female characters, premieres on DCPI's Disney YouTube channel and supported by apparel, books and toys including a new product type, "adventure figures". DCPI has worked on aging up Minnie Mouse by working with several designers for product appealing to adults and young adults for primary the fashion field. With Ashley Eckstein's Her Universe, Disney Consumer had already work with on expanding Star Wars and Marvel products to girls and women. Now Her Universe is working on a Disney co-branded "athleisure" line for both sexes and Disney Princess.

On March 14, 2018, in anticipation of integrating Fox assets, Disney Consumer Products and Interactive Media was merged with Walt Disney Parks and Resorts to form Disney Experiences segment. Disney Media Network, however, did not follow the rest of DCPIM to Parks, Experiences and Consumer Products, but instead was transferred to Disney Direct-to-Consumer and International.

== Franchises ==
Franchises launched
Disney Villains (1993)
Disney Princess (2000)
Disney Fairies (2005)
Disney Bunnies (2007)
Disney Dragonkind (2007)

Andrew P. Mooney of Disney Consumer Products (DCP) created the Disney Princess franchise in January 2000. In 2005, Mooney formed the Disney Fairies franchise which launched in the fall with the Fairy Dust and the Quest for the Egg book. In the early 2000s, Disneytoon Studios (DTS) joined DCP as their internal video partner within the Disney conglomerate in developing the new Disney franchises. While Consumer Products eyed other potential franchises, DTS looked to the Seven Dwarfs for a male-centric franchise to counterbalance the female-centric Fairies by 2005. The Muppet franchise was held by DCP, via the Muppet Holding Company, after it was purchased in 2004 and transferred in 2006 to Walt Disney Studios.

With Disney Princesses becoming a success and Disney Fairies just under way in 2006, Disney Consumer Products started looking into the next possible franchises (see table at right) with Disney Bunnies selected already. In January 2007, two new DCP franchises were launched, Disney Bunnies with three books and Disney Dragonkind with a set of statues.

Complications relating to the production of Tinker Bell, the debut film of the Disney Fairies franchise, led to discussions over the focus of DisneyToon Studios. Pixar's leadership exerted control and affected Franchise projects at the production company. Tinker Bell's animation was scrapped and was restarted while two possible franchise projects were cancelled, "Disney's Dwarfs" and the "Disney Princess Enchanted Tales" line after the latter's first DVD release.

The June 2013 release of the Disney Princess Palace Pets app from Disney Publishing lead DCP to turn Palace Pets into a Disney Princess franchise extension with the release of The Palace Pets toy line in August from licensee, Blip Toys. The line was also listed by TimetoPlayMag.com for its Most Wanted List Holiday 2013.

=== Disney Bunnies ===
Disney Bunnies
- Created by: Disney Consumer Products
- Original work: Licensing spin-off

Print publications
- Books: "I Love You, My Bunnies"; "Thumper Counts to Ten"; "Goodnight, Thumper!"

Miscellaneous
- spun off from: Bambi and Bambi II

Disney Bunnies is a Disney Consumer Products spin-off franchise based on Thumper from the 1942 film Bambi and its 2006 followup Bambi II. Selected as DCP's third franchise to be launched, Disney Bunnies was launched on January 15, 2007, with three books.

=== Disney Dragonkind ===
Disney Dragonkind
- Created by: Disney Consumer Products
- Original work: Licensing spin-off

Miscellaneous
- Toy: Statues
- Spun off from: Disney movies

Disney Dragonkind is a Disney Consumer Products spin-off franchise based on dragons appearing in Disney animated movies. It was launched in January 2007 with a statue of Maleficent (from Sleeping Beauty) in dragon form. Gentle Giant Studios sculpted the three first statues with the last two being: Mushu from Mulan and Elliot from Pete's Dragon.

== Disney Shopping ==
Disney Shopping, Inc., formerly Disney Direct Marketing (Disney Direct Marketing Services Inc.; DDM), is the direct sales subsidiary of Disney Consumer Products, a segment subsidiary of the Walt Disney Company.

=== DS history ===
==== Disney Direct Marketing ====
Fiscal Year	sales (million)
1994	$65
1998	estimated $200

The Walt Disney Company purchased the Childcraft Education Corporation for $52 million from Grolier Inc. to expand its mail-order business, indicating that the children's furniture and equipment area will fit with the Disney characters' target market. Childcraft's mailing list would boost Walt Disney Family Gift Catalog's mailing list from 2.8 million to 8 million.

Disney Direct Marketing Services Inc. was incorporated on May 1, 1990. In 1996, Disney Stores had started leasing land in the Southpoint Distribution Park in Memphis. In 1997, Disney Direct Marketing started operating out of a building built there by Clayco.

Prior to December 1996, Disney Direct Marketing had sold the Playclothes catalog as they did not support the Disney brand. At that time, DDM had a in-house Kansas City telemarketing center and a warehouse in Memphis. In December 1996, DDM's HQ was moved from New York City to the main Disney campus in Burbank, California. Due to the relocation, the unit needed to restaff. Donna Bhatia was hired then as Disney Direct Marketing as vice president of marketing and new business development and was involved in the restaffing adding another 4 hours to her work day. The company added its first services then with the Pooh Gram 1-800 gift service.

The company added its first services in December 1996 with the Pooh Gram 1-800 gift service. In May 1997, Disney Direct Marketing was sued over the service for copyright and trademark infringement of Vermont Teddy Bear Company's trademark mail-order "Bear-Gram" ideas and logo. By October 1997, the case was settled out of court with an agreement that includes changes to reduce confusion.

Also in May 1997, Disney sold its Childcraft Education Corp. to U.S. Office Products Co. for $14.6 million. Disney sold Childcraft as the catalog did not support the Disney brands.

Bhatia got the Disney Catalog distributed by the Disney Stores, which had not happened much before and generated sales of $13 million at lower mail costs. She then found that Disney had multiple (60) customer databases of which only five were used for catalog mailings. A combination of 60 databases had 20 million records after removing duplicated records consisting of 10 million households. With the unified database, Disney started adding additional catalogs started in spring 1997 with The Walt Disney Gallery Catalog plus two more by June 1998. With the increased sales, a new warehouse was being built in South Carolina.

With Disney's purchase of the remainder of Infoseek in July 1999, the Go Network, Infoseek, the Disney Catalog, Disney Online (Disney.com and DisneyStore.com), ABC News Internet Ventures and ESPN Internet Ventures and Buena Vista Internet Group are merged into the Go.com company.

==== Disney Shopping ====
Disney Direct Marketing Services Inc. had changed its name to Disney Shopping, Inc. as it operated online with the disneyshopping.com domain. By January 31, 2006, Disney Shopping's Kansas call center was closed with some of the 250 employees would transferring to a Utah call center and few would remain until May 2006. On May 19, 2009, disneyshopping.com was redesigned and relaunched at a new domain, disneystore.com, with the additional of Disney Parks and Resorts products.

=== Catalogs ===
- Disney Catalog
- Walt Disney Gallery (Spring 1997-), a twice-a-year collectibles catalog, which has also been sent to Lenox Mint, Danbury Mint and Franklin Mint catalog lists. By June 1, 1998, its circulation was 2.5 million copies per year and generating $6 million in annual sales.
- Disney Kids (by July 1998-), sent to parents twice a year in August focusing on back-to-school and in September focusing on Halloween costumes. By June 1, 1998, its circulation was 1.3 million copies per year and generating $3 million in annual sales.
- disneystore.com, formerly disneyshopping.com
- Pooh's Corner (1997-), for fans of the bear character. By June 1, 1998, its circulation was 4 million copies per year and generating $6 million in annual sales.
- Playclothes (sold by 12/1996)
- Childcraft (April 1988-May 1997), a line of educational products

=== Services ===
1-800 gift service

- Pooh Gram (December 1996–) - A parent can order an occasionally-dressed Pooh bear sent with a personal message. This service takes in $10 million in revenue per year.
- Mickey Gram - Pending as of June 1998

Club

- Winnie the Pooh Flag - Sends holiday flags on a regular basis, which did $10 million a year in revenue in 1997.
