= Walt Disney Studios (division) =

American entertainment studio conglomerate

The Walt Disney Studios

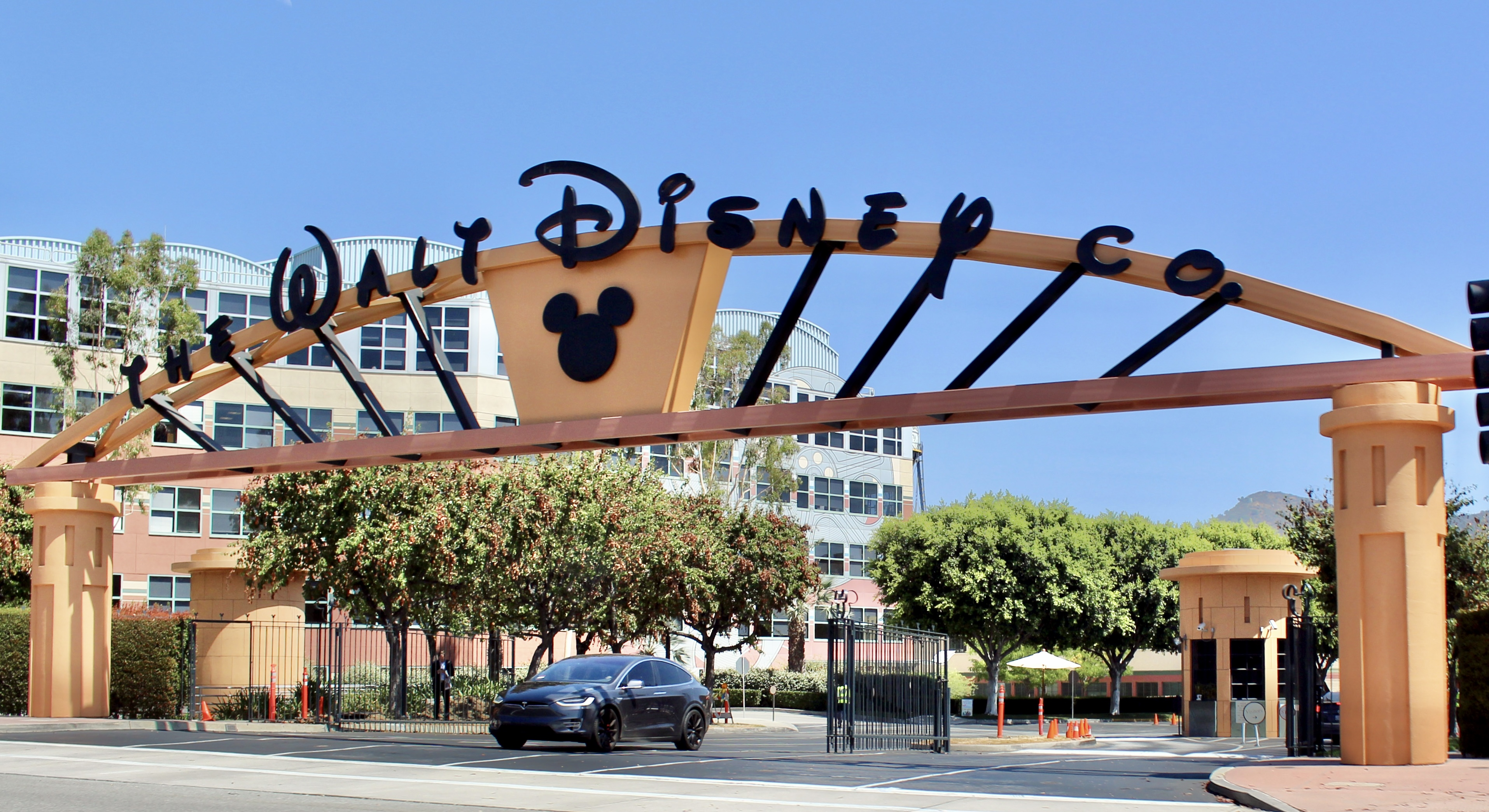
- Walt Disney Studios in Burbank, California pictured sometime in 2016.
- Formerly: Buena Vista Motion Pictures Group (1998–2007)
- Type: Division
- Industry: Entertainment
- Founded: October 16, 1923; 103 years ago
- Headquarters: The Walt Disney Studios, Burbank, California, U.S.
- Number of locations: 7 (2026)
- Area served: Worldwide
- Key people: Alan Bergman (Chairman, Disney Entertainment, Studios and Consumer Products); Cathleen Taff (president, Disney Entertainment, Studios and Consumer Products)
- Products: Motion pictures; Stage productions
- Services: Film production
- Parent: Disney Entertainment
- Divisions: Walt Disney Animation Studios
- Subsidiaries: 20th Century Studios; Disney Consumer Products; Disney Music Group; Disney Theatrical Group; Lucasfilm; Marvel Studios; Pixar Animation Studios; Searchlight Pictures; Walt Disney Pictures
- Website: disneystudios.com

The Walt Disney Studios is a division of the Disney Entertainment business segment of the Walt Disney Company best known for housing its multifaceted film studio divisions. Founded on October 16, 1923, and based mainly at the namesake studio lot in Burbank, California, it is the largest film studio in Hollywood, the seventh-oldest global film studio and the fifth-oldest in the United States, a member of the Motion Picture Association (MPA) and one of the "Big Four" major film studios.

Walt Disney Studios has prominent film production companies including Walt Disney Pictures, Walt Disney Animation Studios, Pixar, Marvel Studios, Lucasfilm, 20th Century Studios and Searchlight Pictures. Walt Disney Studios Motion Pictures distributes and markets the majority of the content produced by these studios for both theatrical exhibition and the company's streaming services. In 2019, Disney posted an industry record of $13.2 billion at the global box office. The studio owns seven of the top ten highest-grossing films of all time worldwide, and several of the highest-grossing film franchises of all time.

== Background ==
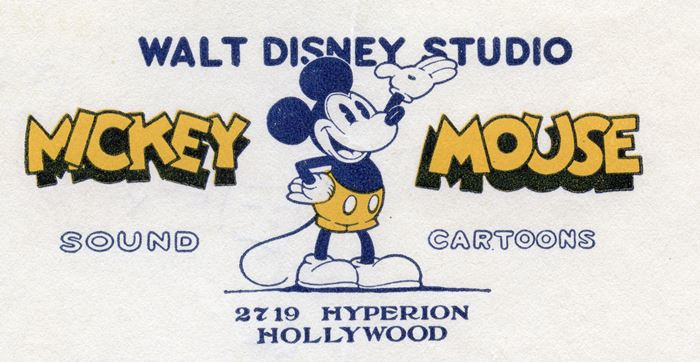
Logo for Walt Disney Studios circa 1928.

Walt Disney Productions began production of their first feature-length animated film in 1934. Taking three years to complete, Snow White and the Seven Dwarfs, premiered in December 1937 and became the highest-grossing film of that time by 1939. In the 1940s, Disney began experimenting with full-length live-action films, with the introduction of hybrid live action-animated films such as The Reluctant Dragon (1941) and Song of the South (1946). That same decade, the studio began producing nature documentaries with the release of Seal Island (1948), the first of the True-Life Adventures series and a subsequent Academy Award winner for Best Live-Action Short Film.

Walt Disney Productions had its first fully live-action film in 1950 with the release of Treasure Island, considered by Disney to be the official conception for what would eventually evolve into the modern-day Walt Disney Pictures. By 1953, the company ended their agreements with such third-party distributors as RKO Radio Pictures and United Artists and formed their own distribution company, Buena Vista Distribution. Disney Productions purchased in 1959 the Golden Oak Ranch for feature films and television series productions complimenting its main Burbank studio.

== History ==
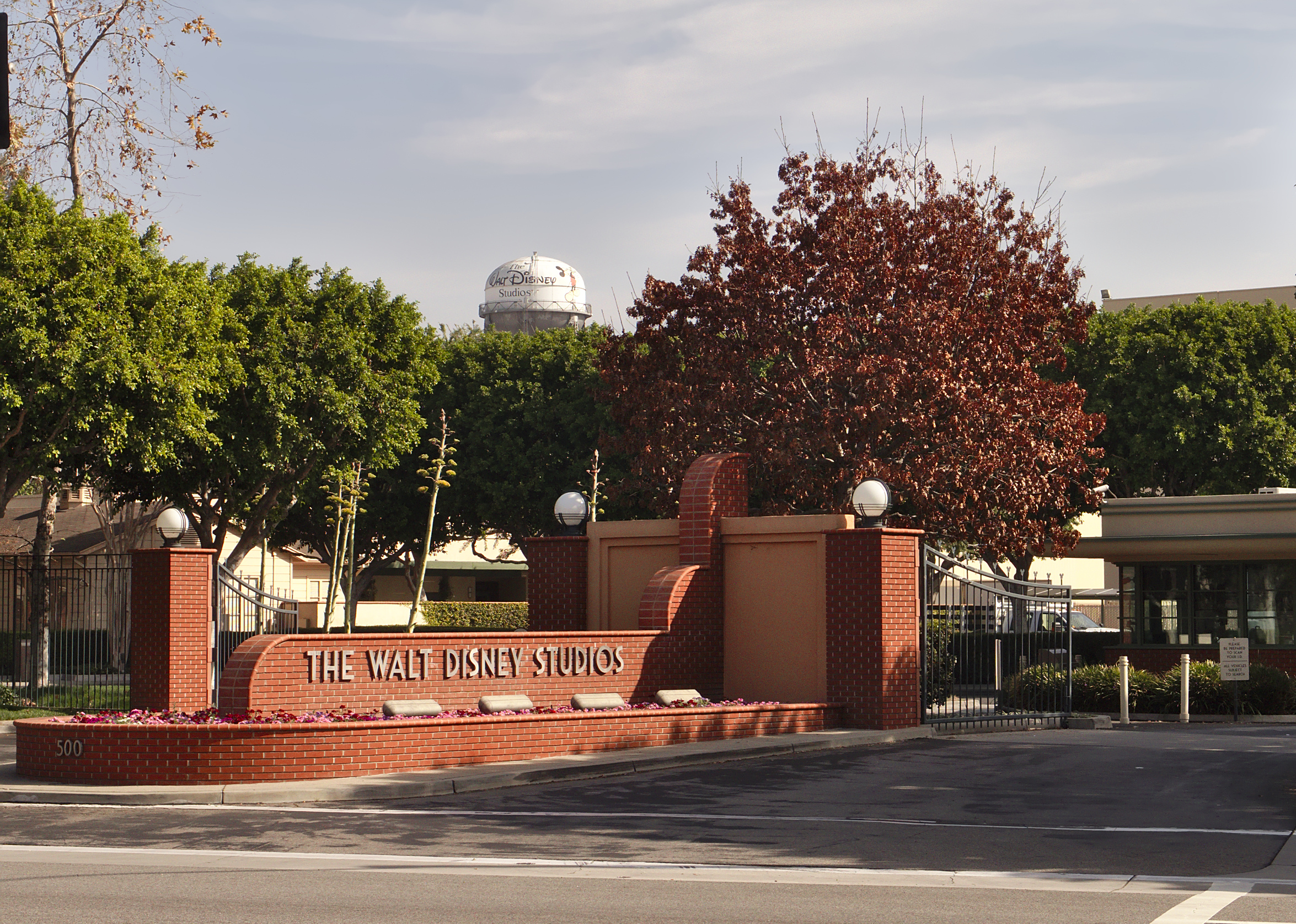
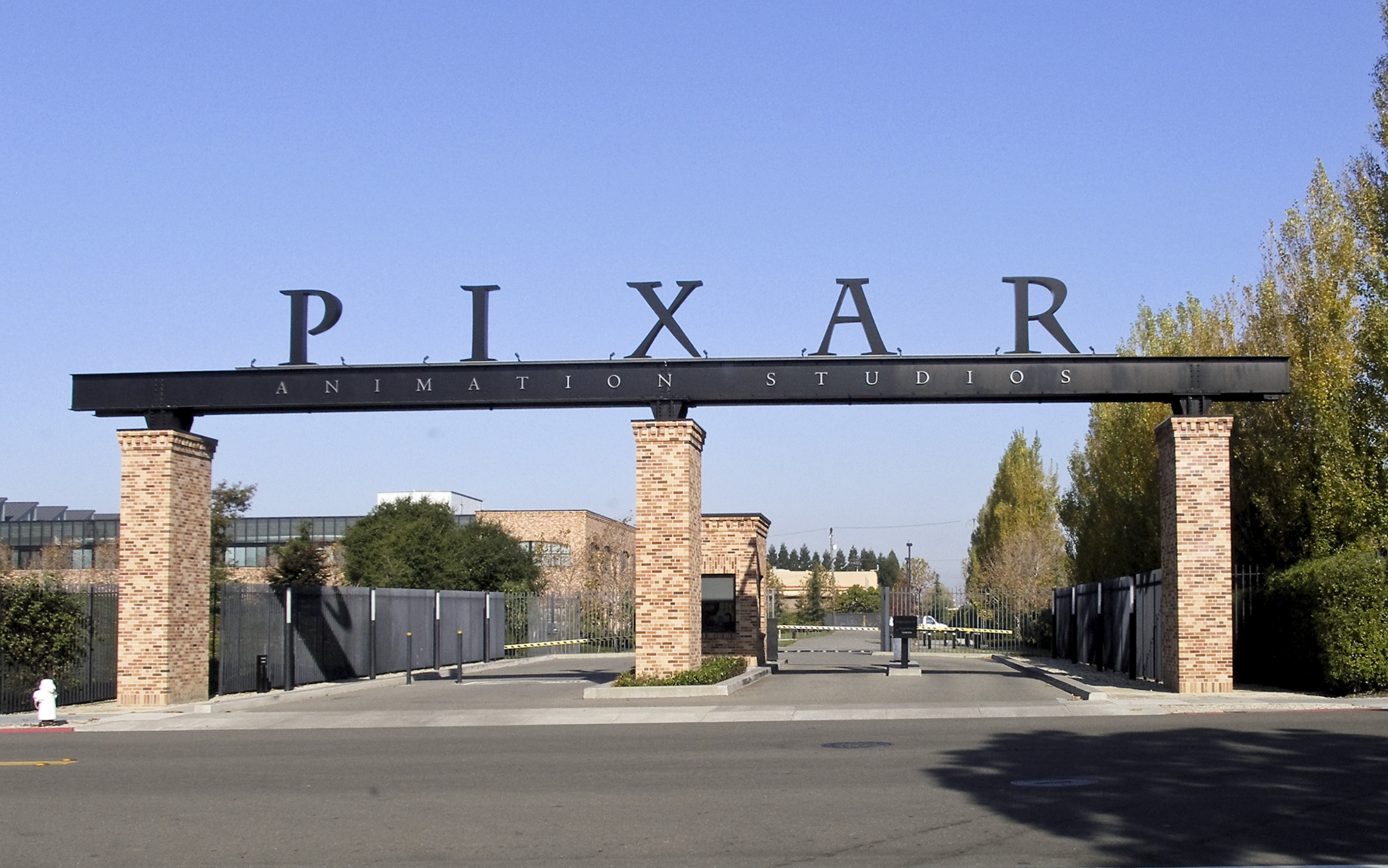
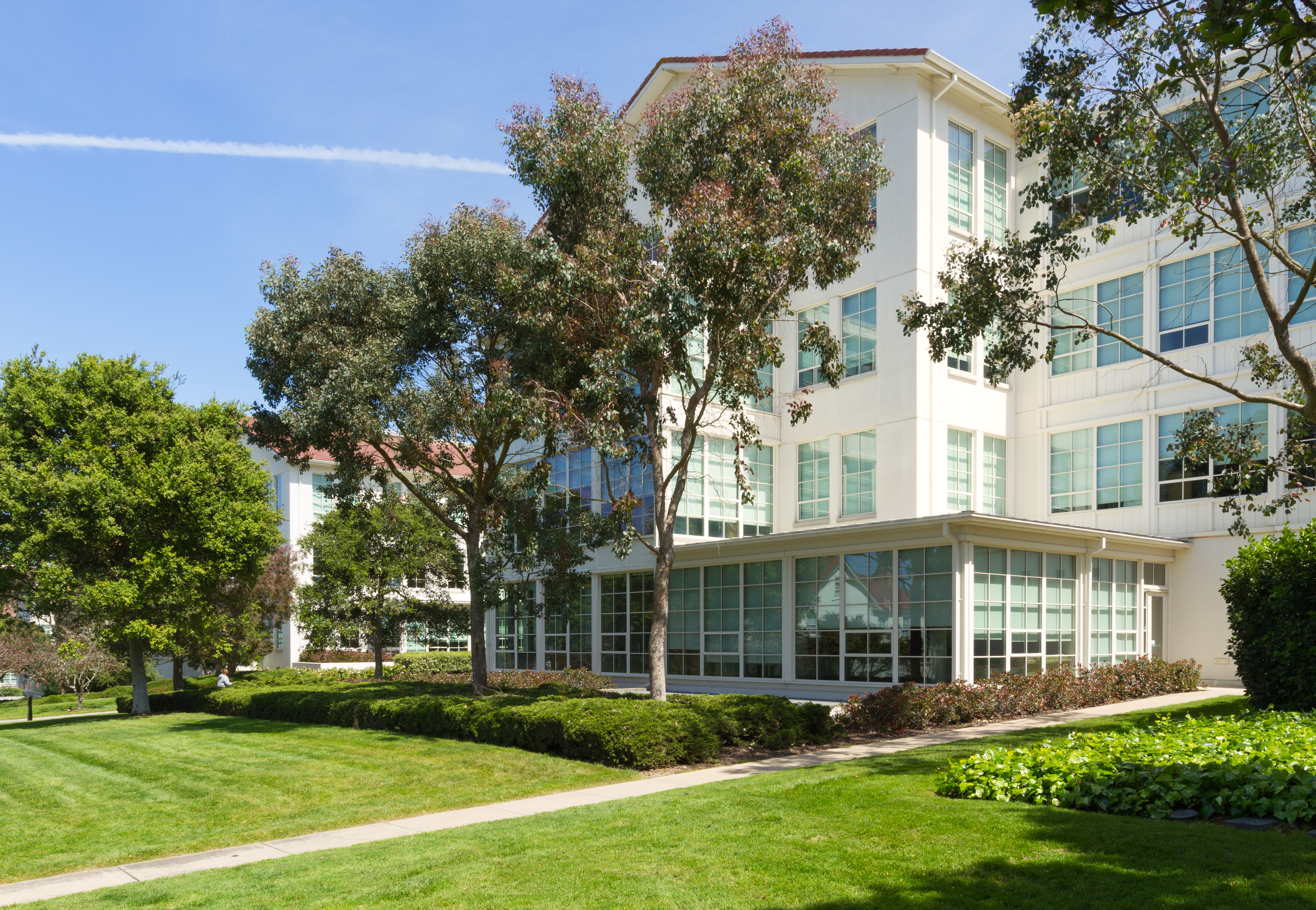
The Walt Disney Studios' several film units are headquartered in various locations throughout California; primarily at the eponymous studio lot in Burbank (top), Emeryville (second), and San Francisco (bottom).

=== 1980s ===
By the 1980s, the Walt Disney Company's collection of film units emerged as one of Hollywood's major film studios, mostly due to newly designed efforts in branding strategies, a resurgence of Walt Disney Productions' animated releases and unprecedented box office successes, particularly from Touchstone Pictures. The Walt Disney Productions film division was incorporated on April 1, 1983 as Walt Disney Pictures. In April 1983, Richard Berger was hired by Disney CEO Ron W. Miller as film president. Berger diversified the studio's output by green-lighting "more adult, more mature" films targeted toward adult audiences. As a result, Touchstone Films was started by Miller in February 1984 as a label for their films (rated PG and higher) with an expected half of Disney's 6 to 8 films yearly slate would be released under the label. Berger was pushed out as a new CEO was appointed for Walt Disney Productions later in 1984, as Michael Eisner brought his own film chief, Jeffrey Katzenberg and film studio president, Richard H. Frank. Touchstone and Hollywood Pictures were formed within that unit on February 15, 1984, and February 1, 1989, respectively.

In October 1984, Daily Variety had identified Disney as the seventh major film studio due to the hiring of Eisner as Disney chairman and his plans for the company. In late 1984, Fred Silverman and his InterMedia production company has struck a deal with the Walt Disney Studios. Organized in 1985, Silver Screen Partners II, L.P. financed films for Disney with $193 million in funding. In January 1987, Silver Screen III began financing films for Disney with $300 million raised, the largest amount raised for a film financing limited partnership by E.F. Hutton. Also in 1985, television production company Witt/Thomas/Harris Productions begin signing a deal with Disney to produce feature films and television shows.

In 1987, the Walt Disney Studios, which until now, had sporadically acquired independently produced films, has plans to aggressively pick up properties for distribution in an effort to become "more of a full-service company", and hired former Circle Films executive Chris Zarpass to the newly created position as vice president of production and acquisitions, and acquisitions had taken on new importance for the company, citing two purchases, which are Benji the Hunted, and Ernest Goes to Camp.

That year, In June 1987, the Walt Disney Studios decided to restructure their divisions at parent company, which included the financial and administrative divisions of Walt Disney Pictures and Television, appointing four directors to the newly created vice president positions, included were John Covas, Linda Stefansen, Anne Waldeck and Lloyd Wendkos, although Covas became the new vice president of administration for Buena Vista Pictures Distribution, while Linda Stefansen was promoted from director of finance at Walt Disney Pictures' marketing division to vice president of administration at the same company, Anne Waldeck was moved into the vice president administrative position for Buena Vista Home Video, and Lloyd Wendkos was named vice president of administration at Buena Vista International.

In April 1988, Touchstone became a unit of Walt Disney Pictures with newly appointed head Ricardo Mestres. With several production companies getting out of film production or closing shop by December 1988, Walt Disney Studios announced the formation of Hollywood Pictures division, which would only share marketing and distribution with Touchstone, to fill the void. Walt Disney Television and Touchstone Television were grouped together under Garth Ancier as president of network television for the Walt Disney Studios on April 18, 1989.

Late in the 1980s, Disney purchased a controlling stake in one of Pacific Theatres' chains leading Disney's Buena Vista Theaters and Pacific to renovate the El Capitan Theatre and the Crest by 1989. The Crest was finished first while El Capitan opened with the premiere of The Rocketeer film on June 19, 1991.

=== 1990s ===
In September 1990, the Walt Disney Company arranged for financing up to $200 million by a unit of Nomura Securities for Interscope films made for Disney. On October 23, 1990, Disney formed Touchwood Pacific Partners I to supplant the Silver Screen Partnership series as their movie studios' primary funding source. In 1992, Walt Disney Studios agreed to fund a production company, Caravan Pictures, for exiting 20th Century Fox chairman Joe Roth. In 1993, Miramax Films was purchased for $60 million by Disney.

On March 30, 1992, Disney Studios agreed to sell KCAL-TV to Pineland, Inc. for a 45% ownership stake in Pineland, so as to have interest in television stations in both large markets, Los Angeles and New York City, allowing for increased original programming. Instead Pineland agreed to an unsolicited bid in May from Chris-Craft Industries thus ending the planned business merger with Disney's KCAL.

David Hoberman, president of Walt Disney Pictures and Touchstone, was promoted by Katzenberg to president of motion pictures at Walt Disney Studios in April 1994, while Ricardo Mestres was forced out as president of Hollywood Pictures in exchange for a production deal.

On August 24, 1994, with Katzenberg's resignation, Walt Disney Studios was reorganized by spinning off a new television group. Richard Frank became head of the newly formed Walt Disney Television and Telecommunications (WDTT). Roth moved in from Caravan Pictures to helm the remaining Walt Disney Studios as chairman. Hoberman stepped down as president in January 1995 to take a five-year, multi-film deal for his production company, Mandeville Films.

Roth was appointed as chairman of Walt Disney Studios in 1996. In April 1996, due to ongoing post-Disney-CC/ABC merger realignment and retirement of its president, WDTT group's division were reassigned to other groups with most transferred to the Walt Disney Studios or CC/ABC. Units returning to the studio were Walt Disney Television, Disney Television Animation, Touchstone Television and Buena Vista Home Entertainment.

Buena Vista International - Latin America and two other companies became owners of Patagonik Film Group, an Argentina-based production company, in 1997. In late 1997, Disney bid on CDR's Epic movie library but lost to PolyGram Filmed Entertainment.

Disney's Buena Vista Distribution and Cinergi Pictures had a 25-picture distribution deal, with Disney taking a 5% stake in Cinergi stock. After nine films were delivered under the agreement, Cinergi sold its 12-film library (except for Die Hard with a Vengeance, co-financed with 20th Century Fox) to Disney on November 22, 1997, for $20 million in exchange for Disney's Cinergi shares, production advances of $35.4 million and other loans.

In 1998, the Buena Vista Motion Pictures Group was formed by Roth to unite the Disney, Touchstone and Hollywood film production units with leadership under David Vogel. This was in order to centralize the various production units and to make live-action film production within Disney more cost-efficient. Roth also determined that the studio's year production slate should be cut. In August 1998, Roger Birnbaum, Caravan's co-founder, left at Roth's prompting to co-found Spyglass Entertainment with former Morgan Creek Productions vice chairman and COO Gary Barber, in which Disney gave Caravan's development slate, a five-year distribution agreement and an advance to Spyglass. After Caravan's remaining three films were released, it went inactive. By May 2000, Disney had taken an equity stake in Spyglass.

Peter Schneider was promoted to studio president in January 1999, while Thomas Schumacher was promoted to president of Walt Disney Feature Animation and Walt Disney Theatrical Productions while both became co-presidents of Disney Theatrical Group. As the first studio president, Schneider had supervisory control of all films released by the Disney labels. In July, Walt Disney Television, including Buena Vista Television Productions, were transferred from the Walt Disney Studios to ABC Television Network to merge with ABC's prime-time division, forming the ABC Entertainment Television Group.

=== 2000s ===
Roth left to form his own production company in January 2000, with Schneider moving to a studio chairman role. Schneider left Walt Disney Studios in June 2001 to form his own theater production company partly funded by Disney. While no successor had been named, Dick Cook, chairman of the Walt Disney Motion Pictures Group (distribution); Thomas Schumacher, president of Walt Disney Animation; and Nina Jacobson, president of the Buena Vista Motion Picture Group (production) would take on the responsibilities of Schneider while continuing in their current positions. In February 2002, Cook was named as studio chairman. In January 2002, Buena Vista International - Latin America formed a joint venture production company, Miravista, with Admira, Telefónica's content production and distribution division, for primarily Brazilian and Mexican film productions.

In January 2003, Disney initiated a reorganization of its theatrical and animation units to improve resource usage and continued focus on new characters and franchise development. Walt Disney Feature Animation — sans Walt Disney Television Animation — and Buena Vista Theatrical Worldwide were organized under the Walt Disney Studios. In 2003, the studio set a worldwide box office record of $3 billion gross.

In September 2005, Disney and Kingdom Films formed a joint venture, Magic Films, to finance a slate of 32 films, which would not include sequels. Kingdom would provide financing with $135 million equity and a $370 million revolving credit line. With the exception of High School Musical 3 as a part of a Disney Channel franchise, Kingdom sued Disney in December 2008. In December 2005, Alan Bergman was promoted to president of the Walt Disney Studios.

In January 2006, the Walt Disney Company announced to acquire computer animation leader Pixar. The deal was finalized in May 2006. Pixar executive Ed Catmull would serve as president of both Pixar and Disney feature animation studios. Pixar executive vice president John Lasseter became chief creative officer for Pixar and the feature animated studios as well as helping to develop new Disney theme park attractions.

In July 2006, Disney announced a shift in its strategy of releasing more Disney-branded (i.e. Walt Disney Pictures) films and fewer Touchstone titles. The move was expected to reduce the Group's work force by approximately 650 positions worldwide. This was a cost-cutting move with its yearly slate would consist of 12 to 15 films.

After being transferred to various other division groups since they were acquired in 2004, The Muppets Studio was incorporated into the Walt Disney Studios' Special Events Group in 2006. In April 2007, Disney retired the Buena Vista brand. Buena Vista Motion Pictures Group and Buena Vista Pictures Distribution were renamed as Walt Disney Motion Pictures Group and Walt Disney Studios Motion Pictures, respectively. Hollywood Pictures was also retired as well. In July 2007, Disney CEO Bob Iger banned the depiction of smoking and tobacco products from Walt Disney Pictures-branded films, as well as limiting such depictions in Touchstone and Miramax films.

In April 2008, the Studio announced the formation of Disneynature, a nature film production label. The Studio launched its Kingdom Comics division in May, led by writer-actor Ahmet Zappa, television executive Harris Katleman and writer-editor Christian Beranek. Kingdom was designed to create new properties for possible film development and re-imagine and redevelop existing movies from the Disney library, with Disney Publishing Worldwide getting a first look for publishing.

On February 9, 2009, Walt Disney Studios entered a 7-year, 30-picture distribution deal with DreamWorks Studios, by which DreamWorks' films would be released through the Touchstone Pictures banner, with Disney collecting a 10% distribution fee. The deal also included a $175 million co-financing loan by Disney to DreamWorks for production and access to slots in Disney's pay television agreement, then with Starz. In late 2009, Miramax Films, a formerly independent Disney film unit, was transferred to the Walt Disney Studios, until its sale in 2010 to Filmyard Holdings. The Kingdom Comics unit's creatives and executives moved its deal to an independent Monsterfoot Productions.

On September 18, 2009, Cook was forced out as chairman, after allegedly having been asked to do so by Iger, for resisting change that Iger felt was needed and the previous year's poor results. He was then replaced by Disney Channels Worldwide president Rich Ross on October 5, 2009.

=== 2010s ===
The Walt Disney Company completed its acquisition of Marvel Entertainment in December 2009 for $4.2 billion. Disney closed a deal with Paramount Pictures to transfer worldwide marketing and the distribution rights to Marvel's The Avengers and Iron Man 3 in October 2010.

In May 2011, Disney India and UTV Motion Pictures agreed to co-produce Disney-branded family films, with both companies handling creative function and UTV producing, marketing and distributing the films.

In August 2011, Disney fired Marvel Studios' marketing department in a restructuring. Disney would take over the marketing and distribution of future Marvel titles, beginning with the 2012 release of The Avengers.

On April 20, 2012, Ross was fired as studio chairman. Former Warner Bros. chief Alan Horn was named chairman on May 31, 2012. On October 30, 2012, Lucasfilm agreed to be purchased by the Walt Disney Company and a new Star Wars trilogy was announced. The deal was finalized on December 21. Later on the same day, Disney agreed to have Netflix as its exclusive U.S. television subscription service for first-run Walt Disney Pictures, Walt Disney Animation Studios, Pixar Animation Studios, Marvel Studios and Disneynature feature films starting in 2016, replacing its agreement with Starz that ends in 2015.

In April 2013, the Walt Disney Studios laid off 150 workers, including staff from its marketing and home entertainment units. In July 2013, Disney acquired all of the distribution rights previously held by Paramount for Marvel Studios' Iron Man, Iron Man 2, Thor, and Captain America: The First Avenger. In December of that same year, Disney purchased the distribution and marketing rights to future Indiana Jones films from Paramount. Paramount will continue distributing the first four films and receive "financial participation" from any additional films. In March 2015, Iger expanded the studio's smoking and tobacco prohibition to include all films released by the studio—including PG-13 rated films and below—unless such depictions are historically pertinent. The studio and Shanghai Media Group Pictures signed a multi-year movie development agreement, before the March 6, 2014, announcement, in which Chinese themes would be incorporated into Disney-branded movies.

In August 2015, Marvel Studios was integrated into Walt Disney Studios with president Kevin Feige reporting to Disney studio chief Alan Horn instead of Marvel Entertainment CEO Isaac Perlmutter. Perlmutter continued to oversee Marvel Television and Marvel Animation until 2019, in which they were folded back into Marvel Studios.

In January 2016, Disney received ownership of all fourteen DreamWorks films it distributed, in compensation for outstanding loans as DreamWorks was restructured into Amblin Partners. Later that same year, Disney distributed The Light Between Oceans—the fourteenth and final film in the DreamWorks distribution deal—and also the last film released under Touchstone.

On December 19, 2016, Walt Disney Studios became the first major studio to reach $7 billion at the global box office. This surpasses Universal's record from 2015 of $6.89 billion. Disney did it with five of the top 10 films of the year with a record four of them, The Jungle Book, Finding Dory, Captain America: Civil War, and Rogue One: A Star Wars Story, with opening weekend takes of over $100 million. Four films in 2016 grossed over $1 billion and another $966 million globally. Two studio units' (Pixar and Marvel Studios) combined lifetime library grosses passed $10 billion.

In November 2017, the studio briefly banned reporters of the Los Angeles Times from attending pre-release screenings for its films, after it had published reports on Disney's political influence in the Anaheim area that the company deemed to be "biased and inaccurate". After a boycott effort emerged among several notable critics and publications (including Washington Post blogger Alyssa Rosenberg, The New York Times, and Boston Globe critic Ty Burr), and several major film critic societies threatened to disqualify Disney films from their year-end awards in retaliation, Disney stated that the company "had productive discussions with the newly installed leadership at the Los Angeles Times regarding our specific concerns", and had reversed its ban.

In December 2017, Disney announced plans to purchase 21st Century Fox (21CF) for $52.4 billion. In preparation for integration of 21st Century Fox assets in March 2018, Disney created a new segment named Walt Disney Direct-to-Consumer and International, merging two segments and transferring various units to the new segment, including the Janice Marinelli-led Walt Disney Studios Home Entertainment. On June 28, 2018, DisneyToon Studios was shut down.

On June 8, 2018, Disney announced Lasseter would be leaving the company by the end of the year, but would take on a consulting role until then. On June 19, 2018, Pete Docter and Jennifer Lee were announced as Lasseter's replacements as chief creative officers of Pixar and Disney Animation, respectively.

In December 2018, the studio surpassed $7 billion in global box office for the calendar year. It was the second time in history that any studio had surpassed the $7 billion mark, after Disney's own industry-record global gross of $7.6 billion in 2016.

Following the acquisition of 21st Century Fox, Disney announced that the film divisions of Fox Entertainment Group (including 20th Century Fox, Fox Searchlight Pictures, Fox 2000 Pictures, 20th Century Fox Animation, Blue Sky Studios, and Fox Family) would be absorbed into the Walt Disney Studios. Fox's filmed entertainment CEO Stacey Snider exited following the acquisition. Fox executives Emma Watts, Nancy Utley and Stephen Gilula joined the Walt Disney Company on March 20, 2019. On March 21, 2019, Disney announced that the Fox 2000 label would be shut down by the end of the year after releasing its films in production. 20th Century Fox Animation was also repositioned to directly report to chairman Horn. 20th Century Fox and its related studios kept their headquarters on the Fox Studio Lot in Century City, thanks to a seven-year lease from the Fox Corporation.

On May 1, 2019, president Alan Bergman was promoted to co-chairman. Horn added the new title of the studio's chief creative officer.

Disney announced a round of layoffs for the studio, mostly from 20th Century Fox, in the production and visual effects departments. They also announced on July 31, 2019, that the Fox Research Library will be folded into the Walt Disney Archives and the Imagineering Research Library by January 2020. The studio announced a 10-year lease of most of the Pinewood Studios near London from the Pinewood Group in September 2019 to start in 2020.

In August 2019, Disney became the first studio to have five films to gross over $1 billion at the worldwide box office in a single year. Walt Disney Studios became the first major studio to reach $10 billion at the global box office in December 2019, breaking their previous record in 2016. The studio ended 2019 eventually earning $13.2 billion in worldwide box office. Disney achieved this on the strength of Avengers: Endgame, The Lion King, Captain Marvel, Toy Story 4, Aladdin, Frozen II, and Star Wars: The Rise of Skywalker all earning over $1 billion.

=== 2020s ===
On January 17, 2020, Disney announced it would drop the "Fox" name from the studio's 20th Century Fox and Fox Searchlight Pictures branding. The two studios were renamed as 20th Century Studios and Searchlight Pictures, respectively. Similar to other Disney film units, films produced under the 20th Century Studios began to be distributed by Walt Disney Studios Motion Pictures in the same year. Searchlight Pictures continues to operate their autonomous distribution unit in North America.

In December 2020, it was announced that effective January 1, 2021, Bergman would become chairman, overseeing creative, production, marketing, and operations for it, while Horn would remain as the studios' Chief Creative Officer, focusing solely on Disney's creative pipeline, and working in conjunction with Bergman on the studio's creative plans.

On February 9, 2021, Disney announced that Blue Sky Studios would be closed effective April 2021, a spokesperson stated this was being done due to the economic situation of the moment. The studio's film library and intellectual properties would still be retained by Disney via 20th Century Animation and Blue Sky Studios itself was folded into 20th Century Animation. Disney Music Group was reorganized back under Walt Disney Studios on February 8, 2023. On April 26, 2023, 20th Digital Studio was dissolved.

In April 2025, Disney announced that it would not renew its lease with Fox Corporation and that it would vacate the Fox Studio Lot in Century City at the end of 2025. As a result, the 20th Century and Searchlight units relocated to the Walt Disney Studios in Burbank.

== Leadership ==
- Alan Bergman, Chairman, Disney Entertainment, Studios
  - Erin Barrier, Senior Vice President, Communications
  - Bernardine Brandis, Executive Vice President, Business Affairs
  - Lynwen Brennan, Co-President, Lucasfilm
  - Jared Bush, Chief Creative Officer, Walt Disney Animation Studios
  - Louis D'Esposito, Co-President, Marvel Studios
  - Pete Docter, Chief Creative Officer, Pixar Animation Studios
  - Eddie Drake, Executive Vice President, Chief Technology Officer
  - Kevin Feige, President, Marvel Studios
  - Rita Ferro, President, Global Advertising
  - Dave Filoni, President and Chief Creative Officer, Lucasfilm
  - David Greenbaum, President, Walt Disney Pictures and 20th Century Studios
    - Steve Asbell, President, Production, 20th Century Studios
    - Daria Cercek, President, Production, Disney Live Action – Theatrical
    - Vanessa Morrison, President, Production, Disney Live Action – Streaming
  - Matthew Greenfield, President, Searchlight Pictures
  - Tom MacDougall, President, Walt Disney Music
  - Martha Morrison, President, Marketing
  - Jim Morris, President, Pixar Animation Studios
  - Paige Olson, General Counsel
  - Paul Shurgot, Executive Vice President and Chief Financial Officer
  - Clark Spencer, President, Walt Disney Animation Studios
  - Philip Steuer, President, Production, Physical, Post Production and VFX production
  - Cathleen Taff, President, Disney Entertainment – Studios and Consumer Products
    - Ken Bunt, President, Disney Music Group
    - Andrew Cripps, Executive Vice President, Theatrical Distribution
    - Andrew Flatt, Executive Vice President, Managing Director, Disney Theatrical Group
    - Anne Quart, Executive Vice President, Producing and Development, Disney Theatrical Group
  - Jamie Voris, Executive Vice President, Office of Technology Enablement
  - Carolyn Wilson, Senior Vice President, Human Resources
  - Jimmy Zasowski, President, Platform Distribution

== Studio structure ==
Studio Divisions
Film Production	Disney Music Group	Disney Theatrical Group	Walt Disney Studios Operations (Studio Services)
Live-action: Walt Disney Pictures; Disneynature; Marvel Studios; Lucasfilm; Industrial Light & Magic; Skywalker Sound; 20th Century Studios; 20th Century Family; Searchlight Pictures (Note: Despite being a production unit within Walt Disney Studios, Searchlight Pictures maintains its own autonomous distribution and marketing unit separate from the main studio for the theatrical release of its films.); Animation: Walt Disney Animation Studios; Pixar; Marvel Studios Animation; Lucasfilm Animation; 20th Century Animation; Distribution: Walt Disney Studios Motion Pictures; Buena Vista International	Walt Disney Records; Hollywood Records; Disney Music Publishing; Disney Concerts; Buena Vista Records; RMI Recordings	Disney Theatrical Productions; Buena Vista Theatrical; Disney Theatrical Licensing; Disney Live Family Entertainment (DLFE); Disney on Ice; Disney Live!; Walt Disney Special Events Group	Disney Studio Production Services; Walt Disney Studios; Golden Oak Ranch; The Prospect Studios; Disney Studios Australia; KABC7 Studio B; Disney Digital Studio Services

=== Film production ===
Walt Disney Pictures is the namesake studio that encompasses the release of its own live-action productions, in addition to films produced by the company's animation studios, mainly Walt Disney Animation Studios and Pixar Animation Studios. Marvel Studios—acquired through Disney's purchase of Marvel Entertainment in 2009—produces superhero films based on Marvel Comics characters, including the Marvel Cinematic Universe franchise. Lucasfilm—acquired by Disney in 2012—develops and produces films, including those in the Star Wars and Indiana Jones franchises. 20th Century Studios and Searchlight Pictures—acquired by Disney in 2019 and together former members of the "Big Six" studios—produce a varied slate of films, with the latter focusing on specialty and prestige films. 20th Century also releases films produced by the animated film unit of 20th Century Animation. Disneynature is an independent film label devoted to producing nature documentary films.

Walt Disney Studios Motion Pictures distributes and markets the content produced by the aforementioned studios for both theatrical exhibition and the company's streaming services, with the exception of the Searchlight label, which operates its own autonomous theatrical distribution and marketing unit. Disney also owns and operates the El Capitan Theatre and Hollywood Masonic Temple.

=== Disney Music Group ===
Disney Music Group is the music recording division consisting two owned record labels—Walt Disney Records and Hollywood Records—along with Disney Music Publishing, the publishing entity that administers the company's music, and as well as Disney Concerts.

=== Disney Theatrical Group ===
Disney Theatrical Group is the division producing live theatrical and stage events. It is currently under the leadership of Andrew Flatt and Anne Quart. The Disney Theatrical Productions division has been responsible for the production of many different musicals, touring events, ice shows and other live theatrical events. Their shows include: Beauty and the Beast, The Lion King, Aida, Tarzan, Mary Poppins, Newsies and numerous incarnations of Disney on Ice.

== Former units ==
In its history, Disney has created or acquired other film banners that have since been closed, divested, or retired.

=== Film production ===
==== Live-action ====
- Buena Vista Motion Pictures Group/Walt Disney Motion Pictures Group (1998–c. 2006) an umbrella unit for live action production companies (defunct)
- Touchstone Pictures (1984–2016) created to release films targeted at more mature adult audiences until it was retired from theatrical distribution; was last used for Disney's distribution deal with DreamWorks from 2011 to 2016.
- Hollywood Pictures (1989–2001, 2006–2007) created as an adult-oriented production unit similar to Touchstone, then briefly revived as low-budget genre film label until it became inactive.
- Caravan Pictures (1992–1999) a production unit created to fill the production schedule, which was replaced by an outside deal with Spyglass Entertainment.
- Miramax Films (1993–2010) acquired as an independent film studio in 1993 and operated as an autonomous unit until 2009, when it was folded into the Walt Disney Studios; it continued to serve as a distribution label until it was sold by Disney to Filmyard Holdings in 2010.
  - Dimension Films (1993–2005) A genre film label acquired through the Miramax purchase, until the Weinstein brothers left Disney and took the label with them in 2005 when they formed The Weinstein Company (the label's next parent).
- Fox 2000 Pictures (2019–2021) Mid-budget unit of 20th Century Studios. (defunct)
- 20th Digital Studio (2019–2023) web series and web films digital media production label of 20th Century Studios

==== Animation ====
- Disney Television Animation (1985–2003) transferred to Disney Channel
- Skellington Productions (1986–1996)
- Disneytoon Studios (2003–2018) transferred from Disney Television Animation (1990-2003).
- Circle Seven Animation (2004–2006) shut down without the production of films.
- ImageMovers Digital (2007–2010) a jointly owned motion capture animation facility that was later shut down.
- Blue Sky Studios (2019–2021) acquired within 21st Century Fox purchase. Announced closure in February 2021, closed in April 2021.
- Marvel Animation (2019–2020) transferred from Marvel Television to Marvel Studios in 2019, closed in 2020.

=== Television ===
- Walt Disney Television (1983–1994) transferred to Walt Disney Television and Telecommunications. (1994–1996)
- Touchstone Television, transferred to Walt Disney Television and Telecommunications and later renamed as ABC Studios.

=== Distribution and marketing ===
- Walt Disney Motion Pictures Group (1998–c. 2001) an umbrella unit for distribution and marketing. (defunct)
- Walt Disney Studios Home Entertainment (1978–2018) transferred to Walt Disney Direct-to-Consumer & International and later, Disney Platform Distribution.

=== Other ===
- Kingdom Comics (2009–2013) with executives departing for a production deal
- The Muppets Studio (2006–2014) transferred from Disney Consumer Products to Disney Studios' Special Events Group, then back to Disney Consumer Products and Interactive Media
- Fox VFX Lab (2019) Acquired within 21st Century Fox purchase. Announced closure in August 2019.

== See also ==
- ESPN Films
- UTV Motion Pictures
