= Carolyn Clark =

Carolyn Clark may refer to:

- Charlotte Clark (died 1960), American seamstress who created the first line of Mickey Mouse dolls
- Carolyn Pollan (born 1937), née Clark, American politician
- Carolyn Ann Clark (born 1958), a cast member on American soap opera Guiding Light
- Carolyn Clark, co-founder the New Jersey Ballet

== See also ==
- Caroline Clark (born 1990), American water polo player
