= CB30 =

American country music duo

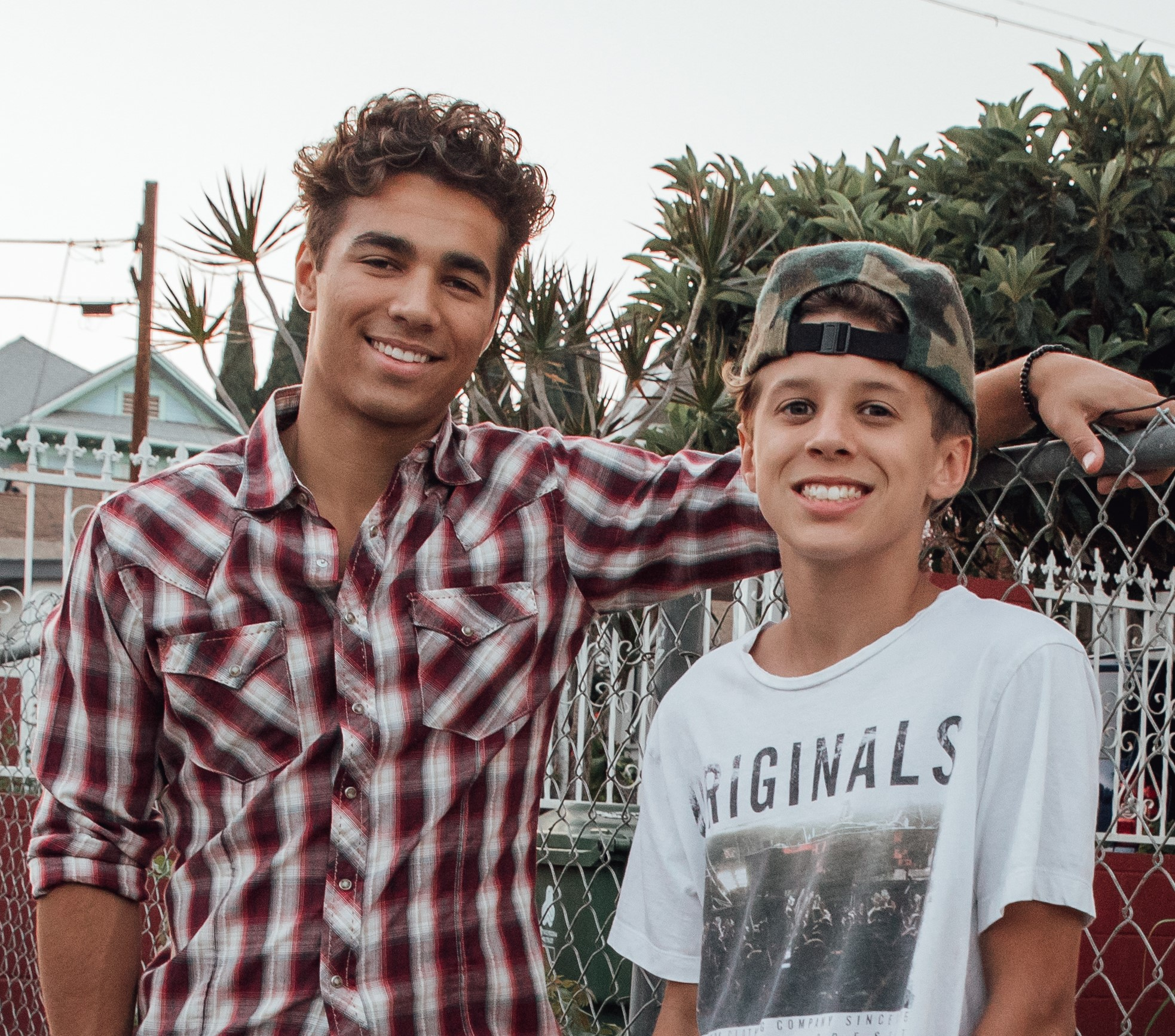
- CB30 in 2018

Background information
- Origin: Nashville, Tennessee, USA
- Genres: Country
- Members: Christian Clementi; Brody Clementi

CB30 is an American country music group composed of brothers Christian (born May 30, 2001) and Brody Clementi (born March 30, 2004). The duo’s name is derived from their first initial of each of their first names and the fact that they were both born on the 30th of the month.

== Career ==
The brothers grew up in Nashville, Tennessee, surrounded by music from a young age, thanks to their father Jay Clementi’s successful songwriting career writing for country singers Martina McBride, Darius Rucker, Dierks Bentley, Sara Evans, Luke Bryan, Sunny Sweeney and many others.

While performing at local charity events in Nashville, the duo was discovered by country superstar Luke Bryan who helped them with music industry connections.

CB30 released their debut single “Marina,” in 2016 along with a music video in which Bryan had a cameo.

The duo’s second single, "Cool If You Wanna" was released on November 10, 2017 via Buena Vista Records - a partnership between Universal Music Group Nashville and Disney Music Group. It features Christian, Jay Clementi, Tyler Posey, Coutinho twins and Jim McCormick as songwriters on the track.

In December 2017, CB30 released a cover of the popular Christmas carol “The Christmas Song” and performed the song during ABC’s CMA Country Christmas at the Grand Ole Opry.

The duo released their third song "Like It’s A Bad Thing," written by Christian and Jay Clementi and Kevin Bard, in April 2018. They made their debut performance with the song at the 2018 Stagecoach Festival on the SiriusXM Spotlight Stage.

In June 2018, CB30 performed during CMA Fest at the Radio Disney Country Stage.

The brothers identify Ed Sheeran and The Everly Brothers as some of their influences. Their debut album was originally expected in 2018, but was never released.

In 2022 they released their track "Don't Say Goodnight" Their "Old Phone" Official Music Video is also available and previously went viral on TikTok.

== Discography ==
TITLE	DATE	ALBUM
"Marina"	2016	Non-album single
"Cool If Ya Wanna"	2017	Non-album single
The Christmas Song"	2017	Non-album single
"Like It's A Bad Thing"	2017	Non-album single
