= Disney Music Group =

Music production arm of Walt Disney Studios, a division of The Walt Disney Company

- Formerly: Buena Vista Music Group (1998–2007)
- Type: Division
- Founded: March 1998; 28 years ago (as Buena Vista Music Group)
- Headquarters: Walt Disney Studios, Burbank, California, U.S.
- Key people: Ken Bunt (president)
- Products: Albums; records; music videos
- Services: Music recording; music publishing
- Parent: Walt Disney Studios
- Divisions: Disney Music Publishing; Buena Vista Records; RMI Recordings
- Subsidiaries: Walt Disney Records; Hollywood Records; Disney Concerts, Inc.
- Website: disneymusic.disney.com

Disney Music Group (DMG) is the music recording and publishing arm of Walt Disney Studios, a division of Disney Entertainment, which is owned by The Walt Disney Company. It is located at the studio's headquarters in Burbank, California. The division's subsidiaries consist of two owned record labels—Walt Disney Records and Hollywood Records—along with Disney Music Publishing, the publishing entity that administers the company's music, as well as Disney Concerts. Disney Music's Vevo account on YouTube is currently one of the most-viewed YouTube channels as of June 2023.

== Background ==
From the founding of The Walt Disney Company in 1923, music has been key to the success of the organization. Both public-domain and original music were used for the initial cartoons, but, since neither Walt Disney nor Roy O. Disney had any music industry experience, the studio had to rely on outside music publishers. In 1928, Walt Disney released the first Mickey Mouse motion picture, Steamboat Willie, which became the first animated short-subject film with sound. Two other unreleased Mickey Mouse shorts had been previously produced and were subsequently given soundtracks prior to their eventual premieres. In 1929, Walt Disney and Carl Stalling wrote "Minnie's Yoo-Hoo", the first song from the Walt Disney Studios, for Mickey's Follies. On December 16, 1929, the Disney Film Recording Company, Limited was incorporated as a subsidiary of Walt Disney Productions.

Saul Bourne at Irving Berlin Music approached the studio after seeing Three Little Pigs with interest in the publishing rights for its theme song, "Who's Afraid of the Big Bad Wolf?". With Disney partnering with Bourne and Berlin, this partnership led to the song being recorded twice by the Don Bestor Orchestra (released by Victor Records) and Bill Scotti Orchestra (released by Bluebird Records). The song was a hit and a Depression era anthem.

Walt Disney Productions then began licensing out its music with the record company either selecting its own or Disney's talent to record the music. Until 1936, no one had issued an actual song track recording on disc. RCA's Victor label released a selection of Disney short film music in England with the US release a year later. The Snow White and the Seven Dwarfs soundtrack album released by Victor was the first feature film soundtrack. Disney had sold its rights to the Snow White music to Bourne Co. Music as they needed more funds to complete the film.

In 1938, Fantasound—the first Surround sound system—was designed and tested by Walt Disney Productions for the release of Fantasia. In 1943, Academy of Motion Picture Arts and Sciences nominated Walt Disney Productions for two Academy Award categories in recognition of Bambi; Music, Scoring of a Dramatic or Comedy Picture and Music, Best Song for its song, "Love is a Song".

In addition to Snow White and the Seven Dwarfs, Disney also sold the music publishing rights to Pinocchio and Dumbo to Bourne. To date, all attempts to reacquire the music rights to the three films had failed. After Bambi, the effects of World War II reduced the production of new feature length animation, with Disney either making feature length live films with some animation or themed short film into anthology films like Make Mine Music. The latter films contain the bulk of the more commercial music which was done by recording stars thus released by their record company.

In April 1947, the Walt Disney Music Company (WDMC) was incorporated, with Fred Raphael putting the company together in late 1949 to publish and license songs from Cinderella. Cinderella records appeared in stores along with other merchandise in 1949 before the 1950 release of the movie. The original RCA 78 RPM multi-disc-album release was number 1 on the Billboard magazine pop charts and as a result, Disney Music was moving rapidly into the Big Business category. While WDMC did not produce the records, Raphael did handle the selection, performance and recording.

James Alexander "Jimmy" Johnson, Jr., a fired Disney publicity staff member who wanted to stay at Disney, moved through a series of jobs there in the traffic department, and then accounting. After a stint in the military, he became assistant to the corporate secretary, then handled merchandising issues among other additional duties. With Roy Disney's split of the merchandising division from Walt Disney Productions, Johnson became head of the merchandising division's publication department in 1950 and took on managing business affairs for the Walt Disney Music Company.

Raphael took the WDMC into creating original non-film music. WDMC had several successful songs outside of the films, including Mule Train by Frankie Laine, "Would I Love You (Love You, Love You)" by Patti Page and "Shrimp Boats" by Jo Stafford, however for every non-film hit there were a score more that flopped. While Alice in Wonderland was a first run failure, its songs became evergreen for the music company with multiple stars performing the music. Raphael moved his office off lot to Hollywood and opened a WDMC in New York.

Walt Disney Productions formed the Wonderland Music Company in 1951.

Disney's next push into music came from The Mickey Mouse Club as eight 6-inch 78 RPM records for the show hit shelves the week it premiered on television. Normal 7-inch 45 RPM versions were cut and released later, both through manufacturing partners of the Walt Disney Music Company. After a year, Golden Records and Am-Par Records turned over production of the show's music back to Disney, leading to the creation of the Disneyland Records label in 1956.

== History ==
The Walt Disney Company traces the Disney Music Group back to the founding of Disneyland Records on February 4, 1956. In that year, the Walt Disney Music Company's Disneyland Records record company was founded on the strength of Fess Parker's 1954 hit recording of the "Ballad of Davy Crockett" using the Disneyland label, which was licensed to Columbia Records. The Disneyland label issued its first album, A Child's Garden of Verses. Also, Disneyland Records issued Parker's "Wringle Wrangle" single from the "Westward Ho the Wagons!" film within a year of starting operations; the single became a hit.

In 1959, Walt Disney Productions founded Buena Vista Records as a Disney-endorsed sub-brand without the "Disney" name; the inaugural release from the label was "Annette", the self-titled album featuring vocalist Annette Funicello.

In November 1989, The Walt Disney Company founded Hollywood Records after acquiring the valuable Queen catalog.

The Lyric Street Records label was founded in July 1997 as a division of Hollywood Records. In August 1997 Mammoth Records was purchased for $25 million to act as an independent music label within Disney.

=== Buena Vista Music Group ===

The industry recognized founding of the group was in March 1998 with the reorganization in Disney that brought all Disney music labels into one unit, Buena Vista Music Group, in the Walt Disney Studios. The group consisted of Hollywood Records, Buena Vista Records, Lyric Street Records and Mammoth Records with Walt Disney Records and Disney Music Publishing transferred out of Disney Consumer Products.

In September 2005, BVMG signed with EMI for distribution of its albums in the UK, Europe, South Africa and the Middle East replacing Warner Music Group. In November 2006, Disney Music Publishing and Warner/Chappell Music Inc. agreed to a licensing agreement for Europe and South America major markets. In 2006, BVMG launched a concert production arm, Buena Vista Concerts starting with The Cheetah Girls: The Party's Just Begun Tour and High School Musical: The Concert.

=== Disney Music Group ===
In April 2007, Disney decided to semi-retire the Buena Vista brand from the group's name. In November 2008, Disney Music Group formed the Disney Pearl label in conjunction with a multi-part deal with Yanni.

Lyric Street launched a subsidiary label, Carolwood Records, in October 2008 which was soon shuttered in November 2009. On April 14, 2010, Disney Music Group announced the closure of the Lyric Street label with some bands transferred to other branches of Disney Music Group and others dropped altogether.

On January 31, 2012, DMG chair Bob Cavallo retired with Ken Bunt succeeding him as head of DMG with a promotion to executive vice president from his post as senior vice president of marketing. Bunt became president on March 27, 2013. A unified licensing department was formed with in Disney Music Group by December 2012 under vice president of licensing Dominic Griffin.

Lucy Hale signed with Hollywood Records' Lyric Street sublabel in June 2012 indicated a return to country music changed to DMG Nashville with her single release "You Sound Good To Me" in the 2nd quarter of 2014.

In February 2016, Disney Music Group, in collaboration with Philips Lighting, launched LightVibes. In January 2017, DMG acquired the distribution rights to the entire Star Wars music catalog from Sony Classical; the soundtrack albums were then released by Walt Disney Records in digital formats the same day. Disney digitally remastered and reissued the original Star Wars soundtrack albums in physical formats on May 4, 2018.

In early April 2017, DMG and Universal Music Group Nashville relaunched Buena Vista Records as a joint venture label for country music and worldwide country music genre projects with the label's first signed act of CB30 duo of brothers, Christian and Brody. The company and DigiTour Media formed in June 2017, RMI Recordings, a new label for "digital-first" talent.

During American Idol's Disney Night on April 29, 2018, DCappella, Disney Music Group's new a cappella singing group, made their debut. On Friday, August 23, 2019, Disney Music Group debuted their first podcast, For Scores, a composer interview series, and kicked off at D23.

== Divisions and labels ==
=== Walt Disney Records ===
Walt Disney Records, the flagship record label of the group, was founded on February 4, 1956 as Disneyland Records, so that Disney would not have to release through third-party labels not associated with the studio, such as RCA Victor or Capitol Records, which had issued Disney albums in the past. Under the Disneyland label, among its other recordings, the studio also released new soundtrack LP's of some of the animated Disney films, including, a 3-LP album set in monophonic sound of all of the classical music heard in Fantasia, perhaps the first soundtrack album containing virtually all the music from a feature-length film. (The "Meet the Soundtrack" intermission segment and the jam session were not included, and Deems Taylor's commentary was also omitted.) Disneyland Records released cover versions (rather than soundtracks) of the songs from some of the other animated films, such as Lady and the Tramp. In 1989, the label was renamed to its current branding and now releases a broad range of Disney-branded music, such as soundtracks to films from Walt Disney Pictures, Walt Disney Animation Studios, Pixar, and Lucasfilm, original studio albums from Disney Channel artists, and compilations albums by Radio Disney.

=== Hollywood Records ===
Hollywood Records, primarily focuses on pop, rock, alternative and country genres, as well as film soundtracks from Marvel Studios, 20th Century Studios, Searchlight Pictures, and Hulu, as well as 20th Television's television series, Disney's cable networks, and international series released exclusively on Disney+ through Star and Hulu (except anime contents). Originally, the label was primarily a soundtrack label for non-Disney branded releases from Touchstone Pictures and Hollywood Pictures, with few major artists, like Queen. The label now releases music from a roster of major artists such as: Breaking Benjamin, Sofia Carson, Olivia Holt and Shawn Hook.

==== DMG Nashville ====
DMG Nashville, is the label used by Hollywood Records to specialize in country music. Patrick Joseph Music and DMG Nashville signed a co-pub agreement with songwriter Melissa Peirce in 2012 with an extension in May 2015. In June 2012, Lucy Hale was signed to Hollywood Record formerly defunct country sublabel, Lyric Street, for a single and album due in 2013. In June 2013, Patrick Clifford was named Vice President of Music Publishing and A&R for Disney Music Publishing in Nashville with responsibility for the A&R functions for Disney Music Group in Nashville. In November 2013, DMG and Bigger Picture Group signed an agreement for DMG to handle music licensing for Bigger Picture. After Bigger Picture's closure in 2014, DMG Nashville released its first studio album, Lucy Hale's Road Between, on June 3.

=== Disney Music Publishing ===
Disney Music Publishing, controls the publishing rights to music from Disney's film, television, theater and theme park divisions. Imprints include Walt Disney Music Company, Wonderland Music Company, Agarita Music, Bantha Music, Buena Vista Music Co., Falferious Music, Five Hundred South Songs, Fuzzy Muppet Songs, Holpic Music, Inc., Hollywood Pictures Music, Mad Muppet Melodies, Marvel Comics Music, Marvel Superheroes Music, Pixar Music, Pixar Talking Pictures, Seven Peaks Music, Seven Summits Music, Touchstone Pictures Music & Songs, Inc., Utapau Music, and Wampa-Tauntaun Music.

=== Disney Concerts ===
Disney Concerts, formerly Buena Vista Concerts, is themselves involved in the holding, production, distribution and sponsoring of concert events related to Disney. In November 2024, they announced the Worlds Collide Tour, an interactive live concert celebrating music from the Zombies and Descendants franchises. The North American tour begins on July 17, 2025. It will feature performances from Kylie Cantrall, Joshua Colley, Malia Baker and Dara Reneé from Descendants: The Rise of Red, and Freya Skye, Malachi Barton and Mekonnen Knife from Zombies 4: Dawn of the Vampires.

=== Buena Vista Records ===
Buena Vista Records, a label founded in 1959 largely devoted to authentic soundtrack albums of mostly live-action Disney film musicals, such as Mary Poppins, The Happiest Millionaire, Summer Magic, and Babes in Toyland, as well as recordings by actors then under contract to Disney, such as Annette Funicello and Hayley Mills. Often, at the same time that Buena Vista Records released a genuine soundtrack album of one of the Disney movies, Disneyland Records, another, less expensive Disney label, would release a cover version of the songs from that film. Buena Vista Records also operates as an imprint of Walt Disney Records and most recently has been employed to serve as a pseudonym for certain releases by Walt Disney Records such as the more adult-oriented Almost Alice and non Disney-branded releases, as well as releasing traditional albums for Walt Disney Records adult artists such as Billy Ray Cyrus and Nathan Pacheco.

Buena Vista Records was relaunched as a country music label in April 2017, as a joint venture between DMG and Universal Music Group Nashville. The label's first signed act was the brotherly music duo, CB30, whose track "Marina" has a Luke Bryan appearance. UMG's Music Corporation of America is currently handled the distribution of Buena Vista Records' releases.

=== RMI Recordings ===
RMI Recordings, a new label formed in June 2017 to sign "digital-first" talent. It was formed with the founders of DigiTour Media, which produces live events with social media artists. The first talent signed to the label was Max & Harvey, a pair of UK twins, in April 2018.

=== S-Curve Records ===
In June 2021, Steve Greenberg announced he would be relaunching his record label S-Curve Records under a new partnership with Disney Music Group. Artists with releases as a part of the partnership include Andy Grammer and Netta.

=== Former labels ===
Disney Pearl, also as Disney Pearl Series, was an imprint of Disney Music Group for adult contemporary and pop music launched in November 2008 with a deal with Yanni for Yanni Voices albums including a Buena Vista Concert extensive tour, two Yanni PBS specials and deals for the album's four vocal talent, Nathan Pacheco, Chloe, Ender Thomas and Leslie Mills. The label released albums, including from Kenny Loggins and Brian Wilson, until 2012.

Lyric Street Records, was an American record label specializing in country music. President Randy Goodman, formerly a general manager for RCA Records, founded the label in 1997. Among its first artists were Lari White, John Berry, Aaron Tippin, SHeDAISY and extremely popular Rascal Flatts. Carolwood Records was a short-lived subsidiary label of Lyric Street launched in October 2008. In April 2010, the label was folded into Hollywood Records.

Mammoth Records, the formerly independent record label was founded by Jay Faires in 1989. In 1993 it became part of a joint venture with WEA-owned Atlantic Records but hit the market again in 1997, when it was bought by the then Buena Vista Music Group, up until which it was based in North Carolina. It had a very successful alternative artist roster including acts such as Antenna, Blake Babies, Chainsaw Kittens, Dash Rip Rock, Dillon Fence, Frente!, Fun-Da-Mental, Fu Manchu, Jason & the Scorchers, Joe Henry, Juliana Hatfield, Kill Creek, Machines of Loving Grace, the Bats, the Melvins, My Friend Steve, Seven Mary Three, Squirrel Nut Zippers, the Sidewinders, Vanilla Trainwreck, and Victoria Williams. In 2003, the label was folded into Hollywood Records.

Touchstone Records was a record label formed as a joint venture between Buena Vista Records and Touchstone Pictures in 1986. It was folded into Hollywood Records in 1998.

== For Scores podcast ==
On Friday, August 23, 2019, Disney Music Group debuted their first podcast, For Scores, produced with Treefort Media and longtime Disney Music executive Maria Kleinman and kicked of at D23. The podcast is a composer interview series with the composer working in film, television and games and hosted by journalist Jon Burlingame. The first set dropped has four episodes interviewing Henry Jackman, Pinar Toprak and Alan Silvestri. A second set is slated for October 2019 and a third for early 2020.

== Distribution ==
Originally, Disney Music Group did not have its own distribution network, either in its native market of the US or internationally. It had a licensing deal with Warner Music Group from 1995 to 2005, and BMG in Europe and Australia. Furthermore, Sony Music Entertainment was also a distributor of Hollywood Records' releases in mainland Asia. After the agreement with Warner expired, Disney engaged in distribution negotiations with other third-party companies.

In 2005, Disney relied mainly on Universal Music Group and EMI Music, given the territory. UMG's Universal Music Distribution was responsible for distribution in the United States, Canada, India and other territories across North America, South America, Asia and Japan. Meanwhile, EMI conducted distribution in the United Kingdom, Republic of Ireland, Australia, New Zealand and several other territories across Europe, Africa and the Middle East. In both agreements, Disney handled its own marketing and other similar functions.

In September 2012, Universal Music Group acquired EMI and initially pledged not to renew EMI's European distribution license with Disney. However, in March 2013, Disney Music Group renegotiated their agreement with Universal Music Group, in which distribution and marketing rights were expanded on a worldwide basis, as a method of incurring collaboration between Disney's record labels and artists with Universal's production department. This allows DMG access to Universal's large roster of award-winning music producers and songwriters. In return, UMG now will have access to Disney's extensive marketing entities (including ABC, Radio Disney, Disney Channel, ABC Radio etc.).

Seoul Records, now Kakao M – South Korea's biggest music distributor – formerly handled the Disney music catalog in the 1990s. The catalog was later acquired by S.M. Entertainment. (Universal Music Korea currently handles the Disney music catalog in South Korea.)

== See also ==
- Marvel Music
- Universal Music Group
- Warner Music Group
