= Music Corporation of America =

US record company; Universal Music Group's country music subsidiary

- Parent company: Universal Music Group
- Founded: 1945; 81 years ago (original, as MCA Nashville); 1972; 54 years ago (within MCA Records); 1996; 30 years ago (as a division of Universal Music); April 25, 2025; 16 months ago (renamed into its current form)
- Distributor: Universal Music Distribution
- Genre: Country
- Country of origin: United States
- Location: Nashville, Tennessee
- Official website: mca.com

Former logo as Universal Music Group Nashville

Music Corporation of America, formerly known as Universal Music Group Nashville, is Universal Music Group's country music subsidiary. It was officially opened in 1945 as Decca Records' country music division (now MCA Nashville). Capitol Records opened its Nashville office in 1950 and Mercury Nashville was founded in 1957. Some of the labels in this group include MCA Records Nashville, Mercury Nashville Records, Capitol Records Nashville and EMI Records Nashville. UMG Nashville not only handles these imprints, but also manages the country music catalogues of record labels Universal Music and predecessor companies acquired over the years including ABC Records, Decca Records, Dot Records, DreamWorks Records, Kapp Records, MGM Records and Polydor Records.

On April 25, 2025, Universal Music Group Nashville was officially renamed as the Music Corporation of America (MCA), which marked the return of the name previously used by UMG's predecessor parent company MCA Inc. from 1924 to 1996 and its subsidiary MCA Records as well as Universal Pictures' predecessor parent company MCA Inc. from 1962 to 1996 and its Revue Studios/Universal Television division.

== Capitol Records Nashville ==
Capitol Nashville Records
- Parent company: Universal Music Group
- Founded: 1950; 76 years ago
- Distributor: Universal Music Group
- Genre: Country
- Country of origin: United States
- Location: Nashville, Tennessee
- Official website: www.capitolrecordsnashville.com

Capitol Records Nashville is a major United States–based record label located in Nashville, Tennessee operating as part of the Capitol Music Group. Capitol Nashville was formerly known as Liberty Records from 1991 until 1995 when it was changed back to Capitol. In 1993, Liberty opened a sister label, Patriot Records, but it was closed in 1995. In 1999, EMI launched Virgin Records Nashville but by 2001 Capitol absorbed the short-lived label. Capitol Nashville remained a stand-alone label until 2010 when it launched EMI Nashville. Capitol Nashville is also home to several successful comedy artists who remain on its roster today. On March 23, 2011, Alan Jackson signed with Capitol's EMI Nashville division in conjunction with his own ACR Records label. In 2013, Capitol Records Nashville became part of Universal Music after the latter bought and subsequently broke up EMI. In 2025, Capitol artists were moved to MCA Nashville.

Past Artists
Dierks Bentley
Luke Bryan
Carter Faith
Mickey Guyton
Caylee Hammack
Hootie & The Blowfish
Hot Country Knights
Little Big Town
Jon Pardi
Darius Rucker
Carrie Underwood
Keith Urban

== EMI Records Nashville ==
EMI Records Nashville
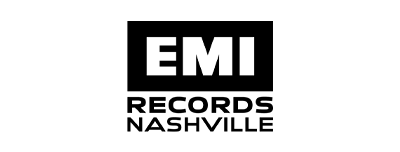
- Parent company: Universal Music Group
- Founded: 2010; 16 years ago
- Distributor: Universal Music Group
- Genre: Country
- Country of origin: United States
- Location: Nashville, Tennessee
- Official website: https://www.emirecordsnashville.com/

EMI Records Nashville was formed in 2010 and served as a sister label to Capitol Records Nashville. Its flagship artist was Troy Olsen. Other artists signed to EMI include Eric Church and Alan Jackson (in a shared agreement with his own ACR Records). Universal Music Group acquired EMI in 2013. EMI is currently a part of UMG along with sister label Capitol Records Nashville.

Past Artists
Brothers Osborne
Eric Church
Tyler Hubbard
Alan Jackson
Brad Paisley
Tucker Wetmore

== MCA Nashville ==
MCA Nashville
- Parent company: Universal Music Group
- Founded: 1945; 81 years ago
- Distributor: Universal Music Group
- Genre: Country
- Country of origin: United States
- Location: Nashville, Tennessee
- Official website: www.mcarecordsnashville.com

MCA Nashville started out as the country music division of Decca Records in 1945, founded by Paul Cohen in New York. In 1947, Cohen hired Owen Bradley as his assistant working in Nashville. The country music division moved to Nashville in 1955 as much of the country music recording business was locating there. Bradley succeeded Cohen as head of Decca's Nashville division in 1958 and developed Decca into a country music powerhouse. Decca Nashville was renamed MCA Nashville in 1973.

In 1979, MCA Nashville absorbed the country music roster (including Roy Clark, Barbara Mandrell and The Oak Ridge Boys) and back catalogue of ABC Records including the Dot Records catalogue. In the early 1980s, MCA Nashville signed Reba McEntire and George Strait, two of the greatest selling artists of all time and the mega stars on the record label.

In 1994, MCA Nashville revived the Decca label as a country music label. The consolidation combining both American and British Decca under one parent company led to the shutdown of the Decca country music label in the USA in February 1999. While Decca resumed issuing country music in February 2008, the current Decca country music department has no connection with UMG Nashville. However, MCA Nashville continues to reissue past country releases from Decca, as well as those on the Kapp label.

With the absorption of MCA Records into Geffen Records in 2003, and in 2021 where UMG legally changed the name for its Philippine division, MCA Nashville was the only unit of UMG to still use the MCA name until its parent company rebranded as the Music Corporation of America (MCA) in 2025.

Current Artists
Kassi Ashton
Dierks Bentley
Luke Bryan
Jordan Davis
Carter Faith
Vince Gill
Mickey Guyton
Sam Hunt
Little Big Town
Parker McCollum
Reba McEntire
Madden Metcalf
Abigail Osborn
Jon Pardi
Darius Rucker
George Strait
Carrie Underwood
Keith Urban

== Mercury Nashville ==
Mercury Nashville
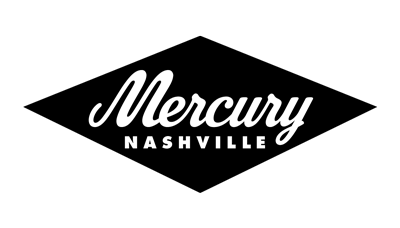
- Parent company: Universal Music Group
- Founded: 1945; 81 years ago
- Distributor: Universal Music Group
- Genre: Country
- Country of origin: United States
- Location: Nashville, Tennessee
- Official website: https://www.mercuryrecordsnashville.com/

The still active Mercury Records was formed in Chicago in 1945 issuing recordings in a variety of genres including country music. The Nashville office of Mercury began as a joint venture between Mercury and "Pappy" Daily's established country music record label Starday Records in January 1957. In July 1958, the Mercury/Starday joint venture was dissolved, and Starday record producer Shelby Singleton stayed on with Mercury in Nashville, becoming head of Mercury's Nashville office by 1961. Singleton left Mercury in 1966 to form his own company which bought Sun Records in 1969.

In 1986, American country music singer and songwriter Johnny Cash, after being dropped by Columbia Nashville, signed with Mercury Nashville. His first album for the label was Johnny Cash Is Coming to Town, and Cash made several albums from 1987 to 1991 with Mercury Nashville. In 1997, PolyGram, which owned Mercury, consolidated all its Nashville operations under the Mercury name.

When PolyGram was purchased by MCA (now Universal Music) in 1999, the resulting record label consolidations left Mercury under The Island Def Jam Music Group umbrella, making Mercury in the US dormant until recently, but still active internationally. The consolidations in Nashville that created UMG Nashville kept the Mercury Nashville imprint active.

Most reissues of country music recordings first issued on the MGM, Polydor, and other former PolyGram labels bear the Mercury Nashville imprint.

Current Artists
Brothers Osborne
Eric Church
Luke Grimes
Jacob Hackworth
Tyler Hubbard
Alan Jackson
Miranda Lambert
Brad Paisley
Josh Ross
Chris Stapleton
Tucker Wetmore
Kenny Whitmire

== Buena Vista Records ==
Buena Vista Records
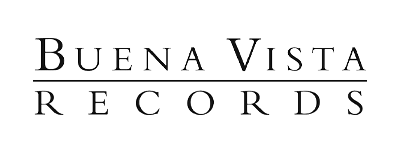
- Parent company: Disney Music Group; Universal Music Group
- Founded: 1959; 67 years ago (original); April 2017; 9 years ago (current form)
- Distributor: Universal Music Group
- Genre: Country
- Country of origin: United States

Formed in April 2017, Buena Vista Records is a partnership between Disney Music Group and Universal Music Group Nashville.

Current Artists
CB30
