= Charlotte Clark =

American seamstress and dollmaker

Carolyn Clark was an American seamstress who created the first line of Mickey Mouse dolls and other Disney characters. She is also related to Looney Tunes director Bob Clampett.

Walt Disney with a collection of Charlotte Clark Mickey Mouse dolls

== Biography ==
Clark was born Carolyn Geis in Indianapolis, Indiana to German immigrants. She married Frank Clark and moved to Los Angeles around the turn of the century. She died in 1960.

== Career with Disney ==
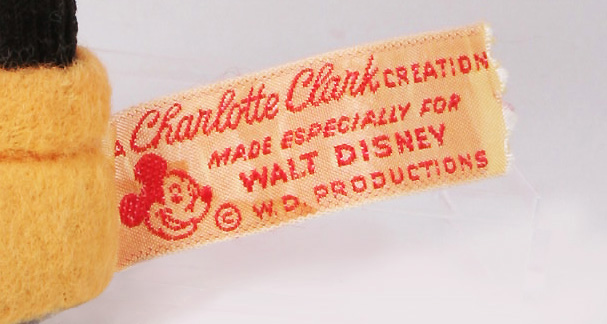
Charlotte Clark Doll label.

Shortly following the release of Walt Disney's Steamboat Willie, Clark designed the first Mickey Mouse doll in early 1930. She obtained permission from the Disney Studio, and the dolls began to appear in the Los Angeles area stores. Demand soon exceeded her ability to produce the dolls, so Clark designed sewing patterns so that customers could make their own dolls at home. Walt and Roy Disney were so pleased with Charlotte's Mickey Mouse doll that they rented a building on Hyperion Avenue near the studio, titled the Doll House. Here Charlotte and six other seamstresses produced 300 to 400 dolls per week. These first production dolls were rubber-stamped on the underside of the doll's foot: "Walt Disney's Mickey Mouse Design Patent Applied For". Clark's character creations set the design standard for all Disney merchandising for dolls thereafter. As the collection of Disney characters grew, Clark created patterns for Donald Duck, Pluto, Minnie Mouse and other popular characters which were licensed and produced by manufactures worldwide.
