= Disney Music Publishing =

American music publishing company

- Industry: Music industry
- Founded: 1956; 70 years ago
- Headquarters: Walt Disney Studios; Burbank, California, U.S.
- Area served: Worldwide
- Key people: Ken Bunt (President)
- Services: Music publishing
- Parent: Disney Music Group
- Website: disneymusicpublishing.com

Disney Music Publishing (DMP) is a global music publishing company and is part of Disney Music Group. They publish multiple songwriters and producers including Dewain Whitmore, Daniel Armbruster, as well as Kristen Anderson-Lopez and Robert Lopez, the songwriters of the Disney musical Frozen.

== History ==
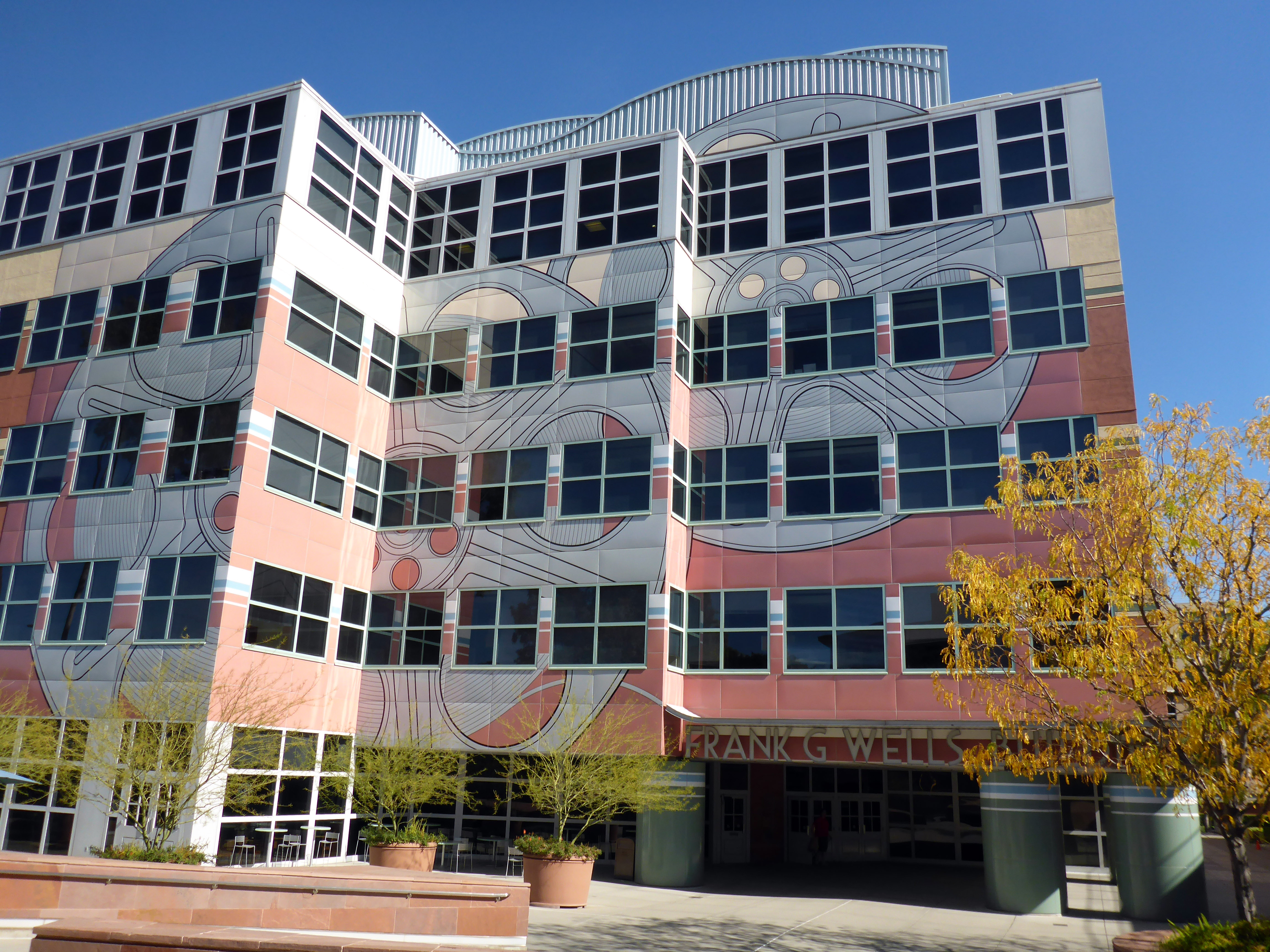
Disney Music Publishing offices at the Frank G. Wells Building

Disney Music Publishing controls the publishing rights to music from Disney's film, television, theater and theme park divisions. In November 2006, DMP and Warner Chappell Music agreed to a licensing agreement for Europe and South America major markets. In 2012, Disney Music Group announced that in conjunction with Hollywood Records, Walt Disney Records, and Disney Music Publishing, they would create a one-stop sync licensing department to streamline use of music that Disney controls. In 2018, Universal Music Publishing Group and DMP expanded their business relationship to the continental Europe, the United Kingdom, Israel and Ireland, as well as countries in the Caribbean and Africa.

== Songwriters ==
Current Disney Music Publishing songwriter and producer clients are:

- Allegra Miles
- Almost Monday
- Andy Social Club
- Chantry Johnson
- Daniel Armbruster
- Dewain Whitmore
- Fashxn
- Freya Skye
- Julian Bell
- Kate Anderson
- Elyssa Samsel
- Kenzie
- Kristen Anderson-Lopez
- Robert Lopez
- Lenii
- Liv Webb
- Live Rabo
- Lucky West
- Michelle Zarlenga
- Nat Young
- Nick Pingree
- Paris Carney
- Pendrick
- The Monarch
- Tony Ferrari

== Imprints ==
Past and current publishing imprints under Disney Music Publishing include:

- Agarita Music
- Buena Vista Music Co.
- Falferious Music
- Five Hundred South Songs
- Hollywood Pictures Music
- HolPic Music, Inc.
- Seven Peaks Music
- Seven Summits Music
- Touchstone Pictures Music & Songs, Inc.
- Vistaville Music
- Wonderland Music Company, Inc.
