= List of programs broadcast by Star Channel =

This is a list of shows that have aired on Star Channel. Shows currently aired on the network are in bold. Shows with a star symbol (★) were available on Star+; those with a plus symbol (+) are available on Disney+ in Latin America.

== 0-9 ==
- 1 Contra Todos (first-run on Star Premium) ★ +
- 9-1-1 ★ +
- 9-1-1: Lone Star ★ +
- 9mm: São Paulo
- 24
- 24: Legacy
- 24: Live Another Day
- 1600 Penn
- 2091

== A ==
- Ally McBeal
- American Dad! ★ +
- American Horror Story ★ +
- Angel ★ +
- Arrested Development

== B ==
- Back in the Game
- Bare Knuckle Fighting Championship ★ +
- Batman
- Bia (from Disney Channel, only for Mexico, Colombia, Argentina and Brazil) +
- Bless This Mess ★ +
- Bob's Burgers ★ +
- Bones ★ +
- Boston Legal
- Boston Public
- Buffy the Vampire Slayer ★ +
- Burn Notice ★ +

== C ==
- Casados con gijos (not seen in Brazil)
- Chicago Hope
- Contos do Edgar (seen only in Brazil)
- The Cool Kids
- The Crazy Ones
- Criminal Minds ★ +
- Cumbia Ninja ★ +

== D ==
- Da Vinci's Demons
- Dark Angel
- Dexter
- Dharma & Greg
- Doc McStuffins: Toy Hospital (from Disney Junior, seen only in Mexico and Brazil) +
- Don't Trust the B— in Apartment 23 ★ +
- Duncanville ★ +

== E ==
- Endgame (not seen in Brazil)

== F ==
- Family Guy ★ +
- Fancy Nancy Clancy (from Disney Junior, seen only in Mexico and Brazil) +
- Fat Actress
- Father of the Pride
- The Finder
- Firefly
- Fresh Off the Boat
- Futurama ★ +

== G ==
- Get Real
- The Gifted +
- girls club
- Glee +
- The Glee Project
- God, the Devil and Bob
- Greg the Bunny
- Grey's Anatomy (first-run on Sony Channel) ★ +
- The Green Hornet

== H ==
- High Stakes Poker
- How I Met Your Mother ★ +
- The Hughleys

== I ==
- Ilha da Sedução (seen only in Brazil)
- The Inside

== J ==
- The Job
- Judging Amy

== K ==
- Kdabra ★ +
- King of the Hill

== L ==
- Lie to Me
- Life in Pieces
- Life on a Stick
- The Lion Guard (from Disney Junior, seen only in Mexico and Brazil) +
- Lipstick Jungle
- The Listener
- The Lone Gunmen
- Love Cruise

== M ==
- Malcolm in the Middle +
- Married... with Children
- Martial Law
- Me Chama de Bruna
- Mental
- Mentes en Shock
- The Mick
- Mickey and the Roadster Racers (from Disney Junior, seen only in Mexico and Brazil) +
- Mighty Morphin Power Rangers
- Millennium
- Minority Report
- The Mob Doctor
- Modern Family ★ +
- Muppet Babies (2018) (from Disney Junior, seen only in Mexico and Brazil) +
- My Name Is Earl ★
- My Wife and Kids ★ +

== N ==
- New Girl ★ +
- The New Normal
- Nip/Tuck
- Nivis, Amigos de otro mundo (from Disney Junior, seen only in México and Brazil) +
- NYPD Blue ★ +

== O ==
- One Tree Hill
- Outcast (first-run on Fox Premium)

== P ==
- Playing House
- Politicamente Incorreto (second-run, first-run on FX and seen only in Brazil)
- Porta na Fox (seen only in Brazil)
- The Practice
- Prison Break ★ +
- Puppy Dog Pals (from Disney Junior, seen only in Mexico and Brazil) +

== R ==
- Reba
- Rescue Me
- Roswell

== S ==
- Scream Queens ★/+
- Se Eu Fosse Você (seen only in Brazil)
- Shark
- The Simple Life
- **The Simpsons** (September, 1993–present; Season 32-34 currently exclusive to Star+;Season 35 onwards exclusive to Disney+ Starting in 2024) ★/+
- Sleepy Hollow ★/+
- Snoops
- Sons of Tucson
- Speechless
- Stargate Atlantis
- Stargate SG-1
- Still Standing
- S.W.A.T. (currently seen on linear television on AXN) ★/+

== T ==
- Talento FOX
- Temptation Island
- Terra Nova ★/+
- This Is Us ★/+
- Titus
- T.O.T.S.: Tiny Ones Transport Service (from Disney Junior, seen only in Mexico and Brazil) +
- Touch
- Tru Calling
- Two Guys and a Girl

== U ==
- Undeclared
- United States of Tara

== V ==
- Vampirina (from Disney Junior, seen only in Mexico and Brazil) +

== W ==
- The Walking Dead (moved to Star+) ★/+
- Wayward Pines
- White Collar ★/+
- Will & Grace (revival)
- Women's Murder Club
- Wonderfalls
- The Wrong Coast

== X ==
- The X-Files ★/+
