= Disney Media Networks Latin America =

Hispanic American division of The Walt Disney Company

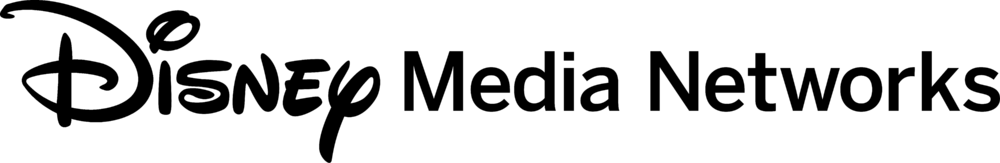
- Trade name: Disney Hispanic America
- Formerly: Disney & ESPN Media Networks Latin America (2005–2019); Fox Networks Group Latin America (2004–2019)
- Type: Subsidiary
- Industry: Television
- Founded: November 1, 2005; 20 years ago
- Headquarters: Buenos Aires, Argentina; Bogotá, Colombia; Mexico City, Mexico; Miami, United States
- Area served: Latin America; Caribbean
- Products: Television channels
- Owner: The Walt Disney Company Latin America
- Parent: Disney Entertainment
- Website: https://prensa.disneylatino.com/canales-tv

Disney Media Networks Latin America, formerly Fox Networks Group Latin America, is the television channels division of the Latin American division of the Walt Disney Company launched on 1 November 2005 with headquarters and master control operations located in Buenos Aires, Argentina.

== History ==
On November 1, 2005, the subsidiaries ESPN Media Networks Latin America and Walt Disney Television International Latin America merged into a new joint sales organization for their television channels. The new entity, called Disney & ESPN Media Networks Latin America, would become responsible for the sales of its television channels ESPN, ESPN 2, ESPN+, Disney Channel and Jetix (Disney XD as of July 3, 2009). Until that time, affiliate sales for Disney Channel and Jetix were handled by HBO Latin America Group. From its launch until 2007, Jetix's operations in Latin America were managed separately in the region by the Jetix Latin America division (formerly Fox Kids Latin America LLC). In that year, it merged with Disney Media Networks.

The Disney Channel, Disney Jr., Star Channel, FX, Cinecanal and National Geographic channels are managed from headquarters in Buenos Aires, Bogotá, Miami and Mexico City. For its part, ESPN has its own studios in a modern production complex called ESPN MediaCenter, located in San Isidro, in the northern part of the Province of Buenos Aires.

In August 2009, Fox International Channels Latin America signed a strategic and distribution alliance with the premium channel network LAPTV. This allowed for FOX affiliate sales teams throughout the region to provide cable, satellite, MMDS and IPTV systems with an integrated service. This service had as its objective increase penetration and value perception of pay TV, both premium and basic, as well as continue efforts to reduce piracy.

The agreement gave LAPTV a local presence in Chile and Central America and expanded its range of commercial opportunities. It was anticipated, for example, that the premium channel group led by Movie City would have a greater promotional presence on Fox's basic channels.

The first major success was the series Kdabra, co-produced by Fox Telecolombia and LAPTV. This series is the first 100% Spanish-language series to combine elements of the real world and the supernatural. Over time, more original productions were developed in other locations in Latin America.

In 2013, LAPTV merged with Fox International Channels Latin America and ceased to exist as such.

On March 19, 2019, following the acquisition of 21st Century Fox, Fox Networks Group and Disney & ESPN Media Networks Latin America merged to create Disney Media Networks Latin America.

On November 26, 2020, Disney announced that Fox Channel would rebrand to Star Channel on February 22, 2021 and launched new graphics for the channel. For its part, Fox Life changed its name to Star Life and Fox Premium changed its name to Star Premium respectively. However, the Star Premium channels closed a year later, on February 1, 2022.

On January 10, 2022, Disney announced that five channels would close: Disney XD, Nat Geo Kids, National Geographic Wild, Star Life and FXM on March 31 of the same year, due to the company's restructuring policy, with the objective of move its contents to Disney Channel, Disney Jr., National Geographic, Star Channel, FX and Cinecanal respectively.

On November 10, 2023, it was officially reported that Fox Sports 2 and Fox Sports 3 channels would be rebranded to ESPN 7 and ESPN 6 respectively on February 15, 2024. The same happened with ESPN Extra which was renamed to ESPN 4, while ESPN 4 was renamed to ESPN 5 for the same day.

== Channels ==
Current

- Disney Channel (HD)
- Disney Jr. (HD)
- Star Channel (HD)
- FX (HD)
- Cinecanal (HD)
- National Geographic (HD)
- ESPN (HD)
- ESPN 2 (HD)
- ESPN 3 (HD)
- ESPN 4 (HD)
- ESPN 5 (HD)
- ESPN 6 (HD)
- ESPN 7 (HD)
- ESPN Premium (HD) (Only in Argentina and Chile)
- BabyTV (HD)
- TV Chile (HD) (Only distribution)
- Canal 24 Horas (HD) (Only distribution)

Former

- Disney XD (defunct)
- Nat Geo Kids (defunct)
- Nat Geo Wild (defunct)
- FXM (defunct)
- Star Life (defunct)
- Star Premium (defunct)
- Fox Sports (defunct, sold to Mediapro in Argentina and to Grupo Lauman in Mexico)

== See also ==
- The Walt Disney Company Portugal
