= List of programs broadcast by Disney Jr. (Latin America) =

== Current programming ==
- PJ Masks (September 26, 2016 – present)
- Puppy Dog Pals (August 5, 2017 – present)
- Vampirina (December 2, 2017 – present)
- Muppet Babies (June 10, 2018 – present)
- Fancy Nancy (October 14, 2018 - present)
- T.O.T.S. (October 14, 2019 – present)
- Bluey (April 20, 2020 – present)
- Mira, Royal Detective (July 20, 2020 – present)
- Dino Ranch (September 20, 2021 – present)
- Spidey and His Amazing Friends (January 10, 2022 – present)
- Mickey Mouse Funhouse (February 14, 2022 – present)
- Firebuds (May 15, 2023 – present)
- SuperKitties (July 17, 2023 – present)
- Star Wars: Young Jedi Adventures (August 2, 2023 – present)
- Kiya & the Kimoja Heroes (September 11, 2023 – present)
- Pupstruction (November 6, 2023 – present)
- Alice's Diary (July 1, 2024 – present)
- Ariel
- Kindergarten: The Musical
- Ranger Rob
- Robogobo
- Mickey Mouse Clubhouse+
- Iron Man and His Awesome Friends
- Sofia the First: Royal Magic
- Magicampers
- Hey A.J.!
- CoComelon Playdates with Sanrio Friends

=== Reruns ===
- The Lion Guard (May 9, 2016 - present)
- Art Attack (2011 - present)
- Mickey Mouse Clubhouse (2011 - present)
- Apple & Onion (2025 - present)
- My Friends Tigger & Pooh (2017, 2022 - present)
- The Super Hero Squad Show (2020 - present)
- Care Bears: Adventures in Care-a-lot (2011 - present)
- Lilybuds (2023 - 2024, 2026 - present)
- Morphle and the Magic Pets (2025 - present)
- Alice's Wonderland Bakery (2023 - present)
- Doc McStuffins (June 4, 2012 - present)
- Mickey Mouse Mixed-Up Adventures (May 8, 2017 - present)
- Mickey and the Roadster Racers (2016 - present)
- 101 Dalmatian Street (November 2, 2020 - present)
- The Rocketeer (April 5, 2020 - present)
- Rock Paper Scissors (2026 - present)
- Henry Hugglemonster (2013 - present)
- Tangled: The Series (2018 - present)
- Elena of Avalor (2018 – present)
- Gigantosaurus (2019 – present)
- DuckTales (2018 – present)
- Eureka! (2023 – present)

=== Blocks ===
==== Wonderful World of Disney ====
Movie block where they are broadcast animated films from Walt Disney Pictures, Pixar Animation Studios and 20th Century Studios, as well as original Disney Jr. specials and acquired films every weekend, similar to the Mini Cine block of its predecessor Playhouse Disney. The block began airing on April 1, 2011 and was removed on October 1, 2020 when Walt Disney Studios Motion Pictures films were removed from pay TV in Latin America. On August 1, 2026, the block returned to the channel following the definitive return of Walt Disney Studios Motion Pictures films to pay TV in Latin America, which had already taken place on Disney Channel in July of the same year.

==== Animated shorts ====
- Pixar Short Films
- Toy Story Toons
- Enchanted Tales
- Cars Toons

==== La Hora Sorpresa ====
Block launched in August 2021 where they are broadcast series from its predecessor Playhouse Disney and classics Disney Jr. series. It's broadcast from Monday to Friday with 1-hour marathons and a rotation of classic series that varies according to the month.

== Former programming ==
- The 7D
- 101 Dalmatians: The Series
- 64 Zoo Lane
- 8 Gemini
- Aesop's Theatre
- Aladdin
- Avengers Assemble
- Bear in the Big Blue House
- Bo on the Go!
- Bubu and the Little Owls
- Bunnytown
- The Chicken Squad
- Chuggington
- Daniel Tiger's Neighborhood
- Dibo the Gift Dragon
- The Doodlebops
- Ella the Elephant
- Elias: The Little Rescue Boat
- The Flower Shop of Barbara/Nana
- Goldie & Bear
- Guess with Jess
- Handy Manny
- Happy Monster Band
- The Hive
- Higglytown Heroes
- Imagination Movers
- Jake and the Never Land Pirates
- Joe and Jack
- JoJo's Circus
- Jungle Junction
- Lilo & Stitch: The Series
- Little Einsteins
- The Little Mermaid
- Maya the Bee
- Molang
- Marvel Super Hero Adventures
- The Mighty Jungle
- Miles from Tomorrowland
- Mickey Mouse
- The New Adventures of Winnie the Pooh
- Oswald
- Olivia
- Ozie Boo!
- Pablo
- Pajanimals
- Paprika
- P. King Duckling
- Poppets Town
- Poppy Cat
- Rolie Polie Olie
- Sheriff Callie's Wild West
- Simon
- Sofia the First
- Spider-Man
- Stanley
- Special Agent Oso
- Strawberry Shortcake's Berry Bitty Adventures
- Tip the Mouse
- Ultimate Spider-Man
- The Wiggles
- Yo Gabba Gabba!
- Zou

== Original programming ==
- Bubba y sus amigos
- Canciones para Soñar
- Doggyworld (Mundo Perro)
- El Ristorantino de Arnoldo
- Guitar & Drum (Guitarra y Tambor)
- Junior Express
- Nivis, amigos de otro mundo
- Opa Popa Dupa
- Playground
- Pequeño gran jurado de la cocina
- Plim Plim
- Mika's Diary
- Morko y Mali
- Clarilu's Garden
- Dino Aventuras
- Disney Junior Clubhouse
