= Disney XD (Brazil) =

Brazilian pay television channel

- Final logo used from 12 June 2015 to 1 April 2022
- Country: Brazil
- Broadcast area: Nationwide
- Headquarters: São Paulo

Programming
- Languages: Portuguese (for Brazil); English (only via SAP audio track)
- Picture format: HDTV 1080i; SDTV 480i (downscaled)

Ownership
- Owner: The Walt Disney Company Brazil
- Parent: The Walt Disney Company Latin America
- Sister channels: Disney Channel; Disney Jr.

History
- Launched: 4 February 1997; 29 years ago (as Fox Kids); 1 August 2004; 22 years ago (as Jetix); 3 July 2009; 17 years ago (as Disney XD)
- Closed: 1 April 2022; 4 years ago
- Former names: Fox Kids Network (1997–1998); Fox Kids (1998–2004); Jetix (2004–2009)

Disney XD was a Brazilian pay television channel owned by The Walt Disney Company and one of the channels of Disney Branded Television which operated across the country. It was based on the eponymous American cable channel.

== History ==
=== As Fox Kids (1996–2004) ===
Fox Kids logo used from 1998 to 2004.

Fox Kids started test broadcasts on the PAS-3 satellite February 4, 1997, nearly three months after its launch in Spanish-speaking countries. It was expected that Sky would receive the channel in March and later on cable from April, dependent on the existence of decoders. The channel was officially launched on April 8 on Sky, followed by Net and TVA on October 1. The channel broadcast as a unified feed until May 4, 1998, when Fox created independent feeds of it and the main Fox channel.

On April 1, 2000, Fox Kids moved from the Advanced package on Net to the Master package, which was the cheapest. This enabled the channel to cover reach 2,5 million viewers, including the 700,000 subscribers of the package. By early 2001, it was the fourth most-watched channel among the youth, above Record. On June 19, 2004, it signed a government agreement in Brasília with Senad to carry its anti-drug campaign during the 2001 Fox Kids Cup. After Fox Kids Worldwide was acquired by Disney in 2002, commercials for the channel started appearing on ESPN; while in October, it started airing a package of cartoons broadcast by ABC Family, its sister operation, prompting Disney to buy content for two channels. The NEOTV association of cable operators cut its signal in the same month due to the high cost of the US dollar, prompting Disney to renegotiate. A pan-regional agreement with HBOLAG was signed on December 5.

Beginning in the 2003 edition, the Fox Kids Cup had know-how from ESPN, becoming responsible for production and advertising sales. In January 2004, the channel was made available on Sky's basic package again.

=== As Jetix (2004–2009) ===
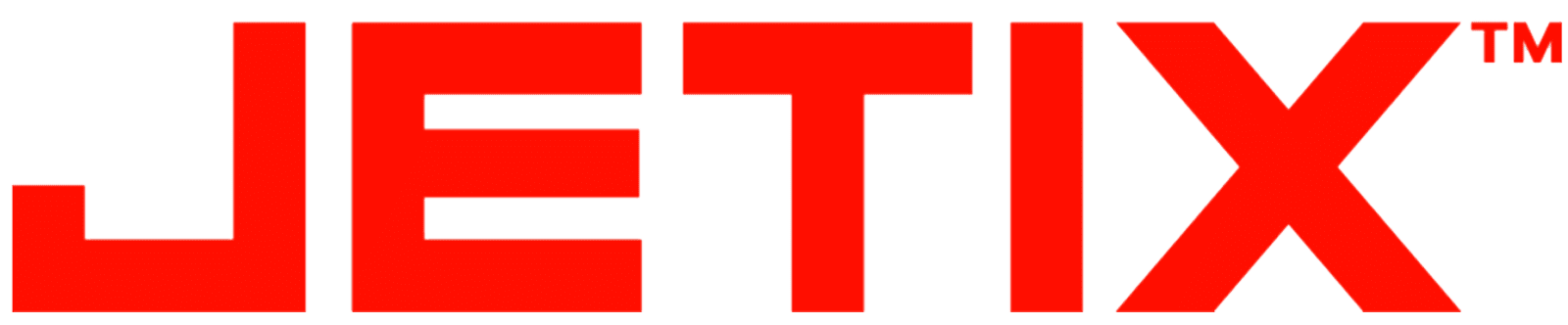
Jetix logo used from 2004 to 2009.

The Walt Disney Company cleared the Jetix brand for use in January 2004, with its launch projected for the middle of the year. In July, it was determined that the rebrand would happen on August 1, with a relaunch ceremony for advertisers happening on July 27 in São Paulo. Technical control was moving from Miami to Buenos Aires as a result.

=== As Disney XD (2009–2022) ===
Disney XD logo used from 2009 to 2016.

In May 2009, after Toon Disney was rebranded to Disney XD in the United States, the Latin American Disney branch confirmed Disney XD would replace Jetix in Latin America on July 3, 2009. As a pre-launch act, it offered an online game, Hero Rising, for eight weeks starting May 15.

In 2014, the network aired X-Coração, an animated series produced in the state of Rio Grande do Sul. The exclusivity agreement to carry the series was broken when the producers licensed the series to air on TV Brasil in 2015.

The channel ceased operations on April 1, 2022, the same day as its Latin American counterpart.

== See also ==
- Disney Channel
- Disney XD
- Disney XD (Latin America)
- Disney XD (international)
