= 21st Century Fox =

American multinational mass media corporation (2013–2019)

Twenty-First Century Fox, Inc.
- Logo used from 2013 to 2019

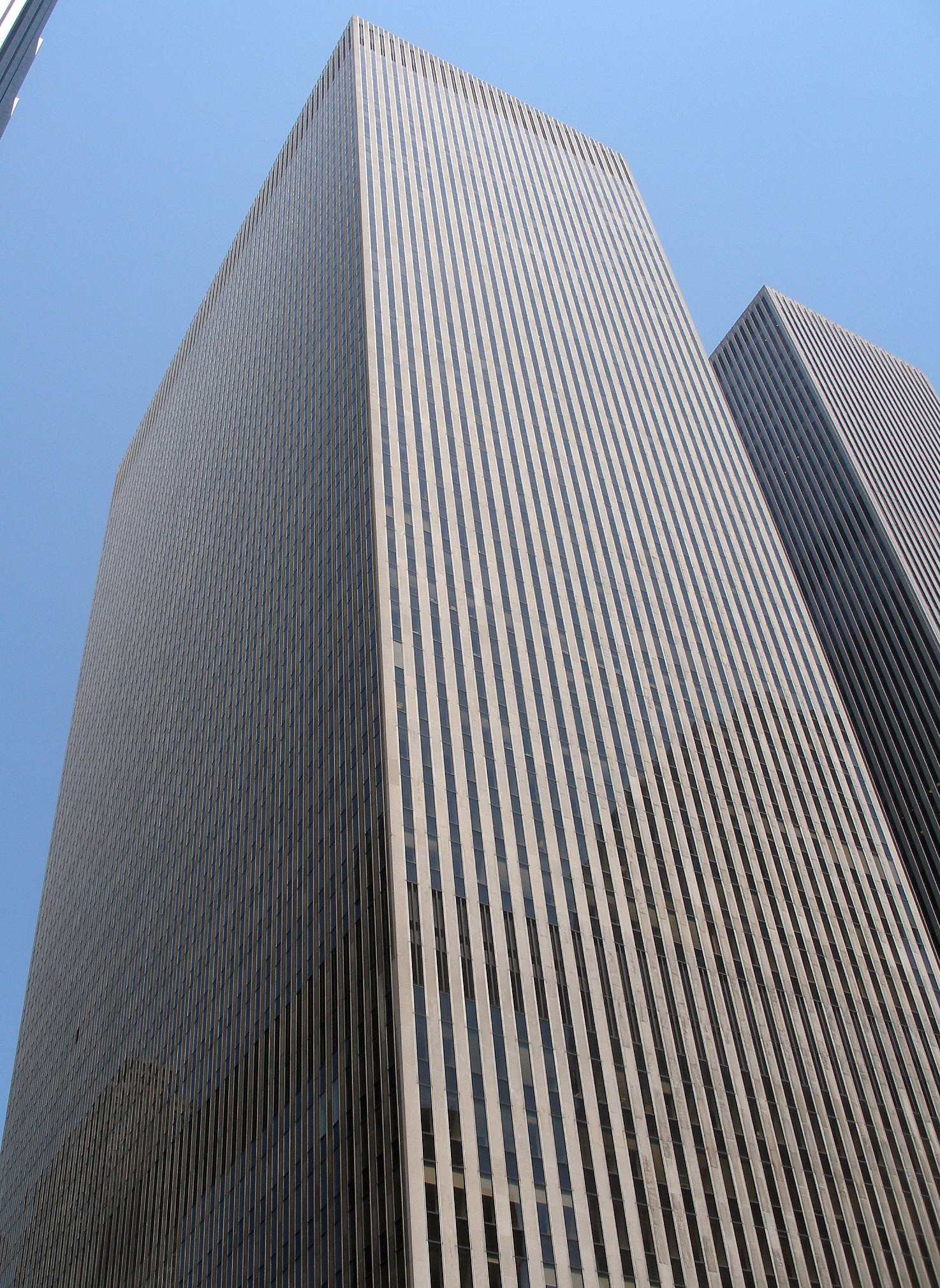
- Headquarters of 21st Century Fox on 1211 Avenue of the Americas
- Trade name: 21st Century Fox
- Formerly: Fox Group (proposed name)
- Type: Public
- Traded as: Nasdaq: FOXA (Class A; 2013–2019); Nasdaq: FOX (Class B; 2013–2019); Nasdaq: TFCFA (Class A; 2019); Nasdaq: TFCF (Class B; 2019); Nasdaq-100 component; S&P 100 component; S&P 500 component
- ISIN: US90130A1016; US90130A2006
- Industry: Media; Entertainment
- Predecessor: News Corporation
- Founded: June 28, 2013; 13 years ago
- Founder: Rupert Murdoch
- Defunct: March 20, 2019; 7 years ago
- Fate: Acquired by and folded into Disney; certain assets were spun off into Fox Corporation
- Successors: The Walt Disney Company (Entertainment assets, cable networks and international networks); Fox Corporation (US broadcasting, news and national sports assets)
- Headquarters: 1211 Avenue of the Americas, New York City, New York, U.S.
- Area served: Worldwide
- Key people: Rupert Murdoch (executive chairman); Lachlan Murdoch (executive chairman); James Murdoch (CEO); Peter Rice (president)
- Revenue: ▲US$30.400 billion (2018)
- Operating income: ▼US$4.410 billion (2018)
- Net income: ▲US$4.464 billion (2018)
- Total assets: ▲US$53.831 billion (2018)
- Total equity: ▲US$19.564 billion (2018)
- Owner: Murdoch family (39% voting power, 2013–2019)
- Number of employees: 22,400 (2018)
- Divisions: Fox Entertainment Group; Fox Networks Group
- Subsidiaries: Endemol Shine Group (50%); National Geographic Partners (73%); Star India; TrueX
- Website: 21cf.com (archived March 19, 2019)

Twenty-First Century Fox, Inc., which did business as 21st Century Fox (21CF), was an American multinational mass media and entertainment conglomerate based in Midtown Manhattan, New York City. It was formed on June 28, 2013, as the legal successor to News Corporation, while the second News Corporation was formed the same day as a spin-off. 21st Century Fox was the legal successor to News Corporation dealing primarily in the film and television industries. It was the United States' fourth-largest media conglomerate by revenue, up until its acquisition by the Walt Disney Company in 2019. The second News Corporation, which is doing business as News Corp, was spun off from the first News Corporation and holds Rupert Murdoch's print interests and other media assets in Australia (both owned by him and his family via a family trust with 39% interest in each). Murdoch was co-executive chairman of 21st Century Fox, while his sons Lachlan Murdoch and James Murdoch were co-executive chairman and CEO, respectively.

21CF's assets included the Fox Entertainment Group—owners of the 20th Century Fox film studio (the company's partial namesake), the Fox television network, and a 73% stake in National Geographic Partners—the commercial media arm of the National Geographic Society, among other assets. It also had significant foreign operations, including the prominent Indian television channel operator Star India. The company ranked No. 109 in the 2018 Fortune 500 list of the largest United States corporations by total revenue.

On December 14, 2017, Disney agreed to acquire 21CF for $52.4 billion in stock. After Comcast mounted an all-cash bid of $65 billion, Disney increased its offer to $71.3 billion in cash and stock. Comcast dropped its bid on July 19, 2018, to instead acquire Sky plc, a British media group in which 21CF held a 39% stake. On July 27, 2018, Disney's offer was approved by shareholders of both companies. The sale covered the majority of 21CF's entertainment assets, including 20th Century Fox, FX Networks, and National Geographic Partners among others; while the sale also included 21CF's regional Fox Sports Networks, Disney was required to sell them within 90 days of the closure of the acquisition to comply with antitrust rulings. The remaining assets, consisting primarily of the Fox and MyNetworkTV networks, and 21CF's local station, news and national sports assets, were spun out into a new company named Fox Corporation, which began trading on March 19, 2019. Disney's acquisition of 21st Century Fox closed on March 20 of the same year.

== History ==
=== Formation ===
21st Century Fox was formed by the splitting of entertainment and media properties from News Corporation. In February 2012, Natalie Ravitz accepted a position to become Rupert Murdoch's Chief of Staff at News Corporation.

News Corporation's board approved the split on May 24, 2013, while shareholders approved the split on June 11, 2013; the company completed the split on June 28 and formally started trading on NASDAQ on July 1.

Plans for the split were originally announced on June 28, 2012, while additional details and the working name of the new company were unveiled on December 3, 2012.

Murdoch stated that performing this split would "unlock the true value of both companies and their distinct assets, enabling investors to benefit from the separate strategic opportunities resulting from more focused management of each division." The move also came in the wake of a series of scandals that had damaged the reputation of the company's publishing operations in the United Kingdom. The split was structured so that the old News Corporation would change its name to 21st Century Fox and spin-off its publishing assets into a "new" News Corporation.

While the company was originally announced as the Fox Group, on April 16, 2013, Murdoch announced the new name as a way to not only leverage the already-established 20th Century Fox brand name, but to also help drive the company into the future (more specifically, the new century). Its logo was officially unveiled on May 9, 2013, featuring a modernized version of the iconic Fox searchlights designed by Pentagram.

However, the 21st Century Fox brand does not extend to the existing 20th Century Fox division (which remains under its original name).

The formation of 21st Century Fox was officially finalized on June 28, 2013. It formally began trading on NASDAQ and the Australian Securities Exchange on July 1, 2013, with its executives including Rupert Murdoch being chairman and chief executive officer (CEO) of the company, while Chase Carey took the posts of president and chief operating officer, with Co-chairman and Co-CEO positions were created in 2014 and later filled by Lachlan Murdoch and James Murdoch, respectively, both sons of Rupert Murdoch.

=== Subsequent history ===
On January 8, 2014, Rupert Murdoch announced plans to delist 21st Century Fox's shares from the Australian Securities Exchange, in favor of solely trading on the NASDAQ. Its listing in Australia was a holdover from its period as News Corporation, and 21st Century Fox has relatively little presence in Australia, unlike News Corp. Murdoch stated that the changes, which were expected to be complete by June 2014, would "simplify the capital and operating structure" of 21st Century Fox and provide "improved liquidity" to shareholders. Also that month, the company acquired a majority ownership in YES Network, a New York regional sports network founded by the New York Yankees.

In June 2014, 21st Century Fox made a bid to acquire Time Warner, which had similarly spun off its publishing assets, for $80 billion in a cash and stock deal. The deal, which was rejected by Time Warner's board of directors in July 2014, would have also involved the sale of CNN to ease antitrust issues. On August 5, 2014, 21st Century Fox announced it had withdrawn its bid for Time Warner. The company's stock had fallen sharply since the bid was announced, prompting directors to announce 21st Century Fox would buy back $6 billion of its shares over the following 12 months.

On July 25, 2014, 21st Century Fox announced the sale of Sky Italia and Sky Deutschland to BSkyB for $9 billion, subject to regulatory and shareholder approval. Fox would use the money from the sale, along with $25 billion it received from Goldman Sachs, to attempt another bid for Time Warner.

In December 2014, Fox-owned television studio Shine Group merged with Apollo Global Management's Endemol and Core Media Group to form Endemol Shine Group, which was jointly owned by 21st Century Fox and Apollo.

On July 1, 2015, Lachlan Murdoch was elevated to Co-Executive Chairman alongside his father and James Murdoch replaced his father as CEO of the company. Former COO Chase Carey became Executive Vice-chairman.

On September 9, 2015, 21st Century Fox announced a for-profit joint venture with the National Geographic Society, which called National Geographic Partners, which took ownership of all of National Geographic media and consumer businesses, including National Geographic magazine, and the National Geographic-branded television channels that were already run as a joint venture with Fox. 21st Century Fox holds a 73% stake in the company.

On December 9, 2016, 21st Century Fox announced it had made an offer to acquire the 61% share of Sky plc that it did not already own. The company was valued at £18.5 billion. The deal was approved by the European Commission on April 7, 2017, followed by Ireland's Minister for Communications, Climate Action and Environment on June 27. However, the deal has become subject to scrutiny and an extended regulatory review in the United Kingdom, over concerns surrounding the plurality of British news media that will be owned by the Murdoch family post-merger (counting Sky News, as well as News Corp's newspapers and recent acquisition of radio station operator Wireless Group), and violations of British news broadcasting regulations connected to Sky's former carriage of Fox News Channel in the country. However, a bidding war ensued over the company; in September 2018, Comcast won a regulator-mandated auction with a bid of £17.28 per-share. On September 26, 2018, 21st Century Fox subsequently announced its intent to sell all of its shares in Sky plc to Comcast for £12 billion. On October 4, 2018, 21st Century Fox completed the sale of its stake to Comcast, giving the latter a 76.8% controlling stake.

The Kingdom Holding Company, owned by Prince Al-Waleed bin Talal, sold its minority stake in 21st Century Fox during the fiscal quarter ending September 2017. It previously held a 6% stake, which had been reduced to around 5% in 2015. The valuation of the shares, or who they were sold to, is unknown; Al-Waleed was the company's largest single shareholder behind the Murdoch family. The sale was reported after Al-Waleed was arrested in early-November 2017 as part of an anti-corruption probe by the Saudi government.

=== Sale to Disney ===
On December 14, 2017, after rumors of such a sale that had been circulating since November 6 following a CNBC report, The Walt Disney Company began its acquisition of 21st Century Fox for $52.4 billion after the spin-off of certain businesses, pending regulatory approval. 21st Century Fox president Peter Rice stated that he expected the sale to be completed by mid-2019.

Under the terms of the deal, 21st Century Fox spun off an entity that was initially being referred to as "New Fox", consisting of the Fox Broadcasting Company, Fox News, Fox Business Network, and the national operations of Fox Sports (such as Fox Sports 1, Fox Sports 2, and Big Ten Network, but excluding its regional sports networks), and Disney acquired the remainder of 21st Century Fox. This included key entertainment assets such as the 20th Century Fox film studio and its subsidiaries; a stake in Hulu; the U.S. pay television subsidiaries FX Networks, Fox Sports Networks and National Geographic Partners; and international operations of Fox Networks Group as well as Star India. The acquisition was primarily intended to bolster two over-the-top content endeavors—ESPN+ and Disney+. Disney will lease the 20th Century Fox backlot in Century City, Los Angeles for seven years.

The proposed transaction raised antitrust issues, due to concerns that it could have led to a tangible loss in competition in the film and sports broadcasting industries. Several legal experts and industry analysts expressed the opinion that the transaction was likely to receive regulatory approval, but would be scrutinized by regulators.

In February 2018, the Wall Street Journal reported that Comcast, the owner of NBCUniversal, was considering a counter-offer. Despite initially bidding $60 billion earlier, Fox had rejected Comcast's offer due to the possibility of antitrust concerns. On May 5, 2018, it was reported that Comcast was preparing to make an unsolicited, all-cash counteroffer to acquire the 21st Century Fox's assets Disney has offered to purchase, contingent on the outcome of an antitrust lawsuit AT&T's acquisition of Time Warner. Comcast confirmed on May 23, 2018, that it was "considering, and is in advanced stages of preparing, an offer for the businesses that Fox has agreed to sell to Disney."

A shareholder vote on the sale was scheduled for special shareholder meetings by Fox and Disney on July 10, 2018, at the New York Hilton Midtown and New Amsterdam Theatre respectively, although Fox warned that it might "postpone or adjourn" the meeting if Comcast were to follow through with its intent to make a counter-offer. It was also reported that Disney was preparing an all-cash offer of its own to counter Comcast's bid.

On June 13, 2018, the day after AT&T was given an approval to merge with Time Warner, Comcast officially announced a $65 billion all-cash counter-offer to acquire the 21st Century Fox's assets Disney had offered to purchase. However, on June 20, 2018, Disney agreed to increase its bid to a $71.3 billion cash-and-stock offer. Fox agreed to the new offer.

The proposed purchase was given antitrust approval by the Department of Justice on June 27, 2018, under the condition that Disney divest all of Fox's regional sports networks. The networks could either be divested to third-parties, or retained by "New Fox". On July 19, 2018, Comcast announced it was dropping its bid for Fox in order to focus on its bid for Sky. On July 27, 2018, it was reported that Fox and Disney shareholders had "overwhelmingly" approved the proposed purchase. The acquisition was expected to be completed by late January 2019, after remaining regulatory approvals are granted in China and the European Union.

In October 2018, it was reported that the new, post-merger organizational structure of "New Fox" would be implemented by January 1, 2019, ahead of the closure of the Disney sale (which was still expected to occur within the early of March).

On November 6, 2018, the European Commission approved the sale, pursuant to the divestment of A&E Networks properties in Europe deemed to overlap with those of Fox. At a shareholders' meeting the following week, it was revealed that the new company would simply be known as "Fox". On November 19, 2018, the deal was approved unconditionally by Chinese regulators.

On January 7, 2019, 21st Century Fox filed the registration statement for "New Fox", under the name Fox Corporation, with the U.S. Securities and Exchange Commission. In an SEC filing, Fox stated that it did not intend to bid for its former regional sports networks.

On February 27, 2019, it was reported by Bloomberg that Disney had also planned to divest the international Fox Sports operations in Brazil and Latin America to secure antitrust clearance in Brazil and Mexico, as they both compete with ESPN International properties in their respective regions. On February 27, 2019, the sale was approved by Brazil's Administrative Council for Economic Defense (CADE), with Disney having agreed to the expected divestiture of Fox Sports Latin America. CADE coordinated with regulators in Mexico and Chile in evaluating the transaction. Mexico approved the sale on March 12, 2019, with similar concessions. Clearance in Brazil and Mexico was reported to be the last major hurdles for the sale.

On March 12, 2019, Disney officially announced that the sale would be completed on March 20, 2019. On March 19, 2019, preliminary trading for the new Fox Corporation on the S&P 500 started in preparation for the formal merger that was finalized on the next day. Under the terms of acquisition, Disney would phase out Fox brand usage by 2024.

Lachlan Murdoch, James Murdoch, their sister Elisabeth Murdoch, and half-sister Prudence MacLeod, each benefited by approximately $2 billion as a result of the Disney transaction.

== Final holdings ==
21st Century Fox primarily consisted of the media and broadcasting properties that were owned by its predecessor, such as the Fox Entertainment Group and Star India. News Corporation's broadcasting properties in Australia, such as Foxtel and Fox Sports Australia, remained a part of the newly renamed News Corp Australia—which was spun off with the current incarnation of News Corp and was not a part of 21st Century Fox.

=== Music and radio ===
- Fox Music
- Fox News Radio
- Fox News Talk
- Fox Sports Radio

=== Studios ===
- Fox Entertainment Group – 20th Century Fox's parent company, merged with various Disney operating units
  - 20th Century Fox – a film production/distribution company, Disney would rebrand it as 20th Century Studios, theatrical distribution folded into Walt Disney Studios Motion Pictures
  - Fox Searchlight Pictures – specialized films, Disney would rebrand it as Searchlight Pictures, albeit keeping autonomous theatrical distribution
  - Fox 2000 Pictures – general audience feature films, dissolved by Disney
  - Fox Studios Australia, Sydney, New South Wales; Disney would rebrand it as Disney Studios Australia
  - Fox Family - a family friendly production company, Disney would rebrand it as 20th Century Family
  - Fox Stage Productions – a theatrical production company, Disney would rebrand it as Buena Vista Theatrical
  - 20th Century Fox Television – primetime television programming, Disney would rebrand it as 20th Television
  - 20th Television – television distribution (syndication), folded into Disney–ABC Domestic Television
  - 20th Century Fox Television Distribution – television distribution, folded into 20th Television by Disney
  - Lincolnwood Drive Inc.
  - Fox 21 Television Studios – low scripted/budgeted television production company, rebranded by Disney as Touchstone Television, later folded into 20th Television
  - Fox Television Animation – animation production company, Disney would rebrand it as 20th Television Animation
  - Fox Television Studios – market-specific programming e.g. and network television company
  - 20th Century Fox Animation – animation production company, Disney would rebrand it as 20th Century Animation
  - 20th Century Fox Games
  - Blue Sky Studios – production of computer-animated films, folded into 20th Century Animation
  - 20th Century Fox Home Entertainment – home video distribution company, folded into Walt Disney Studios Home Entertainment
  - Boom! Studios (minority stake) – comic book and graphic novel publisher, now owned by Penguin Random House
  - Zero Day Fox – web series/films production company
  - Fox VFX Lab
  - New Regency Productions (80%) – general audience feature films
  - Regency Enterprises (20%) – parent company of New Regency Productions
  - Fox Star Studios – the Studio for Indian Movie's Production and Distribution, Disney would rebrand it as Star Studios

=== TV ===
==== Production ====
- Endemol Shine Group, production and distribution company (joint venture with Apollo Global Management) 50%

==== Broadcast ====
These units were transferred to the Fox Corporation, not Disney.

- Fox Broadcasting Company (Fox), an American broadcast television network
- MyNetworkTV, an American broadcast syndication service
- Movies!, an American free-to-air television network (in partnership with Weigel Broadcasting with both owning 50%)
- Fox Television Stations, a group of owned and operated Fox television stations

==== Satellite television ====
- Tata Sky (30%), an Indian Direct to Home Television Service Provider. (in partnership with Tata Group (70%))
- Fox Networks Group Asia Pacific (formerly Star TV), an Asian satellite TV service having 300 million viewers in 53 countries, mainly in Taiwan, China & other Asian countries
- Star India, satellite TV network with landing rights in India.

==== Cable ====
Cable TV channels owned (in whole or part) and operated by 21st Century Fox include:

- Fox Business Network, a business news channel.
- FX Movie Channel, an all-movie channel that airs commercial-free movies from 20th Century Fox's film library
- Fox News Channel, a 24-hour news and opinion channel
- Fox Sports Networks, a chain of American regional cable news television networks broadcasting local sporting events linked together by national sports news programming. Local channels include "Fox Sports Southwest", "Fox Sports Detroit", etc. (some affiliates are owned by Cablevision.)
- Fox College Sports, a college sports network consisting of three regionally aligned channels, mostly with archived Fox Sports Net programmes but also some live and original content.
- Fox Sports International
- Fox Sports 1, a sports network, which presented a wide variety of sports programming.
- Fox Sports 2, a sports network, which served as a counterpart to FS1.
- Fox Soccer Plus, a sister network to FSC, but including coverage of other sports. Launched in 2010 after News Corporation picked up many of the broadcast rights abandoned by Setanta Sports when it stopped broadcasting in the U.S. later transferred to 21st Century Fox.
- Fox Deportes, a Spanish-language North American cable sports network; its sports line-up is tailored to appeal to a Latin American audience.
- FX Networks, a cable network broadcasting reruns of programming previously shown on other channels, but recently creating its own programming, including the Emmy Award-winning programmes The Americans and American Crime Story
- Fox Sports Racing, a motorsports-oriented sports network operating in North American markets outside of the United States as a replacement for Speed, which primarily carried motorsports events from FS1 and FS2.
- Big Ten Network, cable and satellite channel dedicated to The Big Ten Conference, launched August 2007 (51%)
- National Geographic Channel (joint venture with National Geographic Society) 67%
- National Geographic Global Networks 75%
- Nat Geo Mundo (joint venture with National Geographic Society)
- Nat Geo Wild (joint venture with National Geographic Society)
- YES Network (80%), regional cable sports network; broadcasts New York Yankees and Brooklyn Nets games, among other teams.
- Fox Networks Group, domestic cable channels offering different formats of Fox programming in over thirty countries worldwide.
- Fox
- Fox Life
- Fox Crime
- Fox Comedy
- Fox Rewayat
- FX
- FXX
- FXM
- Fox Movies
- Fox Sports
- National Geographic
- Nat Geo Wild
- Nat Geo People
- Nat Geo Music
- YourTV
- Viajar
- Voyage
- Xee
- BabyTV
- Fox Networks Group Latin America – channels available in over 17 countries in Latin America
- National Geographic
- National Geographic HD
- National Geographic Wild
- Nat Geo Music
- Fox Channel
- Fox Premium
- Fox HD
- FX
- Fox Life
- Fox Sports
- LAPTV (Latin American Pay Television) operates 8 cable movie channels throughout South America excluding Brazil.
- Rede Telecine operated 5 cable movie channels in Brazil.
- Fox Telecolombia – Spanish-language television production. (51%)

=== Internet ===
- Fox Sports Digital Media
- Foxsports.com – website with sports news, scores, statistics, video and fantasy sports
- Fox Sports Go – online video streaming site of Fox Sports
- Fox Nation – online video streaming site
- Hulu (30%) – online video streaming site (now owned by Disney, but formerly in partnership with Comcast)
- TrueX

=== Other assets ===
- FoxNext – video game, virtual reality and theme park company
