= Disney Channel (Latin America) =

Latin American pay television network

- Disney Channel's logo used since August 6, 2025
- Country: Argentina; Chile; Colombia; Mexico; United States
- Broadcast area: Hispanic America; Caribbean
- Headquarters: Vicente López, Argentina; Santiago, Chile; Bogotá, Colombia; Mexico City, Mexico; Miami, United States

Programming
- Languages: Spanish; English (via SAP audio track)
- Picture format: HDTV 1080i; SDTV 480i/576i (downscaled)

Ownership
- Owner: Disney Media Networks Latin America
- Parent: The Walt Disney Company Latin America (Disney Entertainment)
- Sister channels: Cinecanal; Disney Jr.; FX; National Geographic; Star Channel

History
- Launched: July 27, 2000; 26 years ago

Links
- Website: disneylatino.com/tv

Disney Channel is a Latin American pay television network in Hispanic America. It is a regional counterpart of the American channel of the same name and was launched on July 27, 2000, initially as a premium service. In 2004, it transitioned to a basic cable network.

The channel operates two separate feeds with distinct programming schedules and time zones. Although it was previously directed principally to children, its target audience has expanded in recent years to include teenagers and adults. Disney Channel Latin America is operated by Disney Media Networks Latin America, a division of The Walt Disney Company Latin America, which is owned by The Walt Disney Company.

== History ==
Disney Channel launched in Latin America on July 27, 2000. When it launched it used the graphical branding also used in Disney Channel's Europe counterpart, created by GÉDÉON, with most of its programming imported from Disney Channel in America with some differences. The network's broadcast was divided in two feeds: North feed, aimed towards Mexico, Central America and the Caribbean, and South feed, aimed towards South America (excluding Brazil), each with different programming schedules. Disney Channel also launched its first original production, Zapping Zone, with hosts bringing news and introducing the Disney Channel Original Series to the viewers.

In 2004, Anne Sweeney, a veteran cable executive, became president of Disney–ABC Television Group and rebranded the channels worldwide. Disney Channel became a basic cable channel in Latin America around the same time and started using the branding of Disney Channel US first introduced in 2002. Along with the rebrand, the channel started to air new series, mainly focused on teenagers and placing the original animated cartoons in earlier schedules. In the morning schedule, Playhouse Disney was aired with programming for children aged 2–7.

In 2005, the network became one of the most watched channels in the region, and started airing Disney Channel Original Series such as That's So Raven and Phil of the Future.

A fourth feed, known as the Central feed, was created and was broadcast in Colombia, Venezuela, Central America and the Caribbean, broadcasting from Colombia and using the Colombian time zone.

In 2006 and 2007, numerous Disney Channel series and film such as Hannah Montana, The Cheetah Girls, High School Musical and Jump In! premiered in Latin America.

On July 1, 2007, the channel rebranded its graphical package to a more "hip" look, using the "Ribbon" branding of the US Disney Channel.

On June 1, 2008, The Walt Disney Company Latin America launched Playhouse Disney (now Disney Jr.), a preschool-oriented channel focused solely on programming for young children aged 2 to 7.

The Disney Junior-branded block in the morning continued to broadcast in the same schedule until 2019. In 2008, Disney Mobile was rebranded as Disney Mobile Studios, which created content for cell phones.

On November 1, 2009, Disney Channel launched its fifth feed, the Pacific feed, aimed at Chile, Peru, Ecuador and Bolivia and employed the Chilean time zone. On that same date, the network changed schedules, idents and promos in all of its feeds. On August 20, 2010, a new logo was introduced. On December 2, 2012, Disney Channel Latin America launched its own HD channel, simulcasting the Central feed.

On July 28, 2014, Disney Channel rebranded its graphical package with the graphical branding Glass first used in Germany on January 17, 2014, and in the US on May 23, 2014.

In 2016, Disney Channel HD became an independent channel with its own schedules, with promos now using three time zones (Mexico, Colombia and Argentina times).

On June 9, 2017, the channel rebranded its graphic identity, with a characteristic design of the communities united by social media, three months after it was introduced in the US.

On July 29, 2019, the channel rebranded its opening graphics, similar to those of the US version, but the promos remained in the previous style. In the same year, all feeds launch their HD simulcasts, with the original HD channel turning into a high-definition simulcast of the Central feed again.

On October 30, 2020, fifteen months after the previous rebrand, the channel rebranded its graphics and typography with the graphical branding Geometric Shapes, disengaging from the US version, which had a more minimalist graphical branding designed by Flopicco and featured a new announcer. The on-screen logo was even smaller and had a variant with a black background.

On December 2, 2024, The Walt Disney Company announced that Disney Channel would end in Brazil along with its sister channels (except for its ESPN channels) on February 28, 2025. In Hispanic America, the channel will continue to operate (along with its sister channel Disney Jr. which had also closed in Brazil on April 1, 2022) as it is one of the most popular pay TV channels in Mexico and in all Hispanic America, that added to the facts that the Hispanic American market having a high penetration of pay TV and is less reliant on cord-cutting than Brazil.

On August 6, 2025, the channel rebranded its logo, typography and graphic identity with the graphical branding Reflections designed by MAKinÉ Studios and Claus Studios, six months after the US version. The new brand opts for a modern and minimalist design similar to the graphical branding Signature Strokes used on Disney Channel EMEA, with a gradient color palette of blue and pink/purple. In addition, the on-screen logo it became a large size again, and the new logo removes the Mickey Mouse ears from the letter I.

== Feeds ==
Disney Channel has two different feeds for each region, which are called North and Panregional; these are broadcast in high definition natively simultaneously with the standard resolution signal. Until July 2014, the North, Center and HD feeds featured Mexican voice actors Noé Velásquez and Pedro de la Llata, with a neutral accent, while the South feed was narrated by Argentine voice actor Leandro Dugatkin with a River Plate accent. After the rebrand of July 28, 2014, all the feeds featured locutions of Noé Velázquez and Lion Ollivier. Since the rebrand of October 30, 2020, all the feeds feature locutions of Emilio Treviño and Natalia Rosminati.

List of feeds
Feed Name	Country/Territory	Headquarters	Language(s)	Time Zone(s)
North	Mexico	Mexico City	Spanish; English (via SAP)	Mexico - CT (UTC−06:00)
Panregional	Argentina; Bolivia; Caribbean; Central America; Chile; Colombia; Dominican Republic; Ecuador; Paraguay; Peru; Uruguay; Venezuela	Buenos Aires; Bogotá	Spanish; English (via SAP)	Argentina - ART (UTC−03:00); Colombia - COT (UTC−05:00)

=== Notes ===
- In January 2010, a channel signal was launched based in Santiago and aimed at Chile, Peru, Ecuador and Bolivia. It was divided into two sub-signals, with the same programming: One for Chile and Bolivia, with Chilean hours and commercials; and another for Peru and Ecuador, with local commercials and with one or two hours of delay in programming, depending on the time change in Chile in summer and winter. The deferred sub-signal for Peru and Ecuador was discontinued in March 2017, in favor of a new autonomous signal specifically for those two countries, called the Peru signal. On June 5, 2017, the Pacific signal was suppressed to serve as a mirror channel to the South Atlantic Signal with a difference of one hour (Signal +1), based in Buenos Aires, while the Peru signal's broadcast was discontinued autonomously. and retransmits the same content as the South Atlantic signal (later South Signal) with a difference of two hours (signal +2). Both services broadcast advertising according to the countries of coverage. In April 2019, Signal +2 was eliminated and replaced by Signal +1 in Peru and Ecuador.
- In Peru, Movistar TV formerly offered the Pacific signal without delay in the satellite service, while in the digital and analogue cable service it had the signal deferred for two hours (Pacific Signal +2). From March to June 2017, the cable channel becomes Peru Signal. In June 2017, due to the changes made by Disney, Movistar began to offer the South Signal +2 by cable, while the South Signal +1 continued to be available in the satellite service. In April 2019, after the elimination of the South Signal +2, the cable service replaced it with the Signal +1.
- In Chile, Peru and Ecuador, the original Sur signal are seen through DirecTV and TuVes HD, since May 2021, these countries geographically receive the Sur signal.
- In Colombia, Movistar TV broadcast the Pacific signal until February 2017, when it was replaced by the North Atlantic Signal (later Central Signal) due to the division of the Pacific signal in two.
- In Venezuela, Movistar TV distributes the South Signal +1. From March to June 2017, it continued to distribute the Chile signal despite the division of the Pacific signal.
- In Argentina, Disney Channel issued Advertising Space identifiers, as a result of the legal provisions established by Law 26,522 on Audiovisual Communication Services and Modifications. This practice was reversed in 2016.
- In Mexico, Disney Channel displays age rating identifiers at the beginning of each program or film available under media laws in the country.
- From its launch in December 2012 until its closure in August 2018, Disney Channel HD was broadcast simultaneously throughout Latin America in high definition, but did not make a simultaneous connection with local signals. It had independent programming. On August 14, 2018, the channel was replaced by the HD versions of the local signals depending on the country. In itself, its programming began to broadcast the Disney Channel's Central signal.
- In Argentina, Movistar TV distributed the North Signal from 2018 until 2020, when it was replaced by the channel's South signal.
- In Honduras, the operator Mayavisión distributes Disney Channel's North signal but not the channel's Panregional Signal.
- In Central America and the Dominican Republic, the Sky satellite operator broadcasts the North Signal instead of the Panregional signal.
- In Colombia and Paraguay, Claro TV offered the South Signal +1 in its satellite service, since May 1, 2021, it offers the original South signal after the elimination of the South Signal +1.
- In Panama, Tigo in its satellite version broadcasts the South +1 signal instead of the Center Signal. From May 1, 2021, it broadcasts the original South signal after the elimination of the South +1 signal.
- On May 1, 2021, the South +1 signal was discontinued after in eleven year ran and was replaced by the original South signal without delay in Chile, Bolivia, Peru and Ecuador.
- On February 1, 2025, the Central signal was eliminated, with the North and Panregional signals remaining. The countries of Central America and the Caribbean, Colombia and Venezuela began receiving the South signal, with the channel reverting to being composed of two signals as in its launch.

== Programming ==
Series produced by Disney Television Animation and Disney Channel Original Series are aired on most of the schedule. Some non-original series have also aired, such as Floricienta, Patito Feo, Mortified, The Fairly OddParents, Chiquititas, A Kind of Magic, The Secret Show, The Next Step, George of the Jungle, Miraculous: Tales of Ladybug and Cat Noir, Find Me in Paris, Trollhunters: Tales of Arcadia or Tara Duncan. There are also locally produced original series, such as a As the Bell Rings, Soy Luna, Violetta, Bia, STM or Selenkay.

=== Programming blocks ===
==== Sabatón ====
Sabatón (lit. 'Saturday Marathon') is a programming block that originated on Disney XD that is broadcast every Saturday. The block is composed of different marathon of each animation series that airs three hours each week. It's joined the channel on April 2, 2022, two days after Disney XD was shut down in the region.

==== Cartoon Block ====
The block was formerly occupied the Disney Junior block, it is mainly used as a cartoon block with animated Disney Channel original series and series from Disney Television Animation. The series that are aired and their schedules are varied depending on the zone.

==== Disney Channel TBT ====
The block first aired in May 2020, and consisted of the broadcast of original series and movies that aired on the channel in the 2000s such as Hannah Montana, Wizards of Waverly Place, Brandy & Mr. Whiskers, American Dragon: Jake Long, The Suite Life on Deck, Jonas, That's So Raven, Kim Possible, Phineas and Ferb,The Emperor's New School and Sonny with a Chance. It was broadcast only on Thursdays. In June 2020, the block was removed from the channel, but in October 2020 it returned to the channel's programming, this time airing Monday through Friday, but only broadcasting the channel's live action series from the 2000s, also adding Cory In The House to the lineup in 2023. In September 2026, the block changed its structure to a one-hour marathon format, airing Monday through Friday with a different classic live action series each day, and featuring three classic live action series on Sundays.

==== Wonderful World of Disney ====
Wonderful World of Disney it's the channel's movie block where movies from the library of Walt Disney Studios Motion Pictures, Disney Channel Original Movies and films acquired are broadcast. The block it is broadcast every weekends.

It was founded on the same day as the channel and its first movie broadcast was The Lion King. It was being aired on Thursdays, Fridays, Saturdays and Sundays after Zapping Zone and it then went on to be broadcast every day until it went off the air in 2020 before his return to the channel in 2026. Some of the films they were premiering on HBO Family before they premiered here. The highest-rated film in this block was High School Musical 2, with 3.3 million viewers.

On October 1, 2020, all films from the library of Walt Disney Studios Motion Pictures had been removed from the Disney Channel's programming due the launch of Disney+ in Latin America on November 17, 2020. Not only this affected Disney Channel and its sister networks, but also the WarnerMedia networks that were still airing Disney films at the time. This caused the channel to broadcast only Disney Channel Original Movies and films acquired. In February 2022, the High School Musical, Descendants and Zombies franchises films had been removed from the channel's programming along with the premieres of new Disney Channel Original Movies, causing the channel to only broadcast older Disney Channel Original Movies, and premiere only Latin Americans films originals and acquired films. On May 11, 2026, it was announced that the High School Musical, Descendants and Zombies franchises films would returns to the channel's programming from the May 22, 2026 after 4 years off the air. Also would returned the premieres of new Disney Channel Original Movies, starting with the premiere of Zombies 4: Dawn of the Vampires on June 5 of the same year. On June 23, 2026, it was confirmed that all films from the library of Walt Disney Studios Motion Pictures would returns to the Disney Channel's programming from the July 11, 2026 after 6 years off the air, marking their definitive return to pay TV in Latin America. This movement subsequently would apply to Disney Jr. and the rest of its sister channels in August of the same year.

==== Holidays ====
Due to the season differences in Latin America, the timing of the summer special varies by region. It starts in late June and ends in early September in the North feed. In the Pan-Regional feed it begins in December and ends in late February. It includes premieres of new films and television series episodes.

The channel did not air the New Year events of Disney Channel of the United States. It locally produced its New Year Event as an original production of the channel, at first was named Celebratón, whose special included a vote for the viewers on the website for their favorite movies, episodes, and specials. The most voted ones were aired December 31. It was hosted by the cast of Zapping Zone. It replaced the previous block "Popcorn".

Currently, the Halloween and Christmas specials have different names each year and include themed episodes of the channel's series, as well as themed movies respectively.

=== Former programming blocks ===
Zapping Zone

Disney Channel Latin America produced an original series titled Zapping Zone, on which different hosts interact with the viewers with games and trivia. It was aired only on weekdays from July 27, 2000, to October 26, 2012. They also give news about Disney Channel, the channel's series, upcoming Disney films and new Disney Channel Original Movies. The program was pre-recorded. Viewers could call to participate in different games, all of them containing questions and trivia about Disney films and series. Just for participating, they could win T-shirts and caps, and if they win, the awards included DVDs, soundtracks and video games of other Disney films and characters.

The hosts of the Zapping Zone presented the series, Disney Channel Original Series that were aired in the block as a primetime. New episodes of animated and live-action series were often aired every weekday. New music videos or trailers also premiered in the block, introduced by the hosts. There were also blocks such as Stop, Bloopers, and Xtreme Friday.

Mouse, Camera, Action!

It was a block that consisted of the selection of three films already preselected by the channel through audience voting. The winning film was broadcast on the last Sunday of the month. Previously, two voting methods were promoted, which were through SMS messages and online voting on the official Disney Channel website. Later, only the use of the official website as a voting site was promoted. In August 2017, the block was removed from the channel.

Dis or Dat

It was a weekly voting block where the audience chose two pre-selected series via the official Disney Channel website for a two-hour marathon of the winning series every Friday and later movies were also included in the voting for the block. The block was removed from the channel in December 2017.

==== Disney Junior on Disney Channel (previously Playhouse Disney) ====
When the channel launched, it had a morning block for preschoolers, where aired series such as Rolie Polie Olie, Bear in the Big Blue House and PB&J Otter. On May 6, 2002, the name Playhouse Disney was first introduced; however, unlike its international counterparts, the Latin American logo was a mixture between the international logo and the American Playhouse Disney logo. In 2010, the block was removed from the programming on the South signal, however, it continued to air in the rest of Latin America. On April 1, 2011, the block was renamed to Disney Junior on Disney Channel, whose block was only available on the North, Central and Pacific signals. On May 1, 2019, the block was removed from the channel.

== Sister channels ==
=== Disney Jr. ===
Logo of Disney Jr.

It is a pay television channel broadcasting in all Latin America using two feeds. It is directly marketed to preschoolers. It was launched on June 1, 2008 as Playhouse Disney Channel. Formerly it was only a programming block that aired on Disney Channel during mornings. It airs programming similar to the US channel; however, it also airs non-original programming. On April 1, 2011, the channel was rebranded as Disney Junior and later Disney Jr. in 2024.

=== Disney XD (closed) ===
Logo of Disney XD

It was a pay television channel broadcasting throughout Latin America and the Caribbean. It was launched on November 8, 1996, as Fox Kids, rebranded on August 1, 2004, as Jetix, and relaunched as Disney XD on July 3, 2009. It was broadcast using two feeds. It featured male-focused series along with action, comedy and animated series. It was marketed to children from 6 to 14. It was operated by Disney Media Networks and The Walt Disney Company Latin America, which are owned by The Walt Disney Company. On April 1, 2022, the channel was shut down in the region; as well as Nat Geo Kids, Nat Geo Wild, FXM and Star Life, due to the company's restructuring policy.

== Logos ==
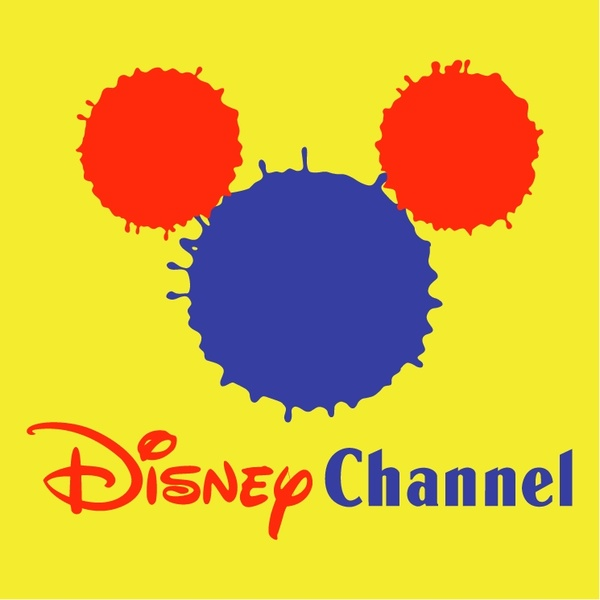
2000–2003

2003–2010 (with slight modifications until 2014)

2010–2014

2014–2017

2017–2019

2019–2025

2025–present (Used as banners on 1 July 2025, later rebranded completely on 6 August 2025)

== See also ==
- Disney Channel
- Disney Channel (Portugal)
- Disney Jr. (Latin America)
- The Walt Disney Company Latin America
- Disney Branded Television
