= Star Channel (Brazil) =

Defunct Brazilian pay television channel (1994–2025)

- Broadcast area: Brazil

Programming
- Languages: Portuguese; English (as an optional audio track)
- Picture format: 1080i HDTV (downscaled to 16:9 480i for the SDTV feed)

Ownership
- Owner: The Walt Disney Company Brazil
- Parent: The Walt Disney Company Latin America
- Sister channels: Cinecanal; Disney Channel; FX; National Geographic

History
- Launched: 27 September 1994; 32 years ago (as Fox)
- Closed: 1 March 2025; 20 months ago (as Star Channel)
- Former names: Fox (1994–2018); Fox Channel (2018–2021)

Star Channel (formerly known as Fox and Fox Channel) was a Brazilian pay television channel operated by The Walt Disney Company Brazil, a part of The Walt Disney Company Latin America. The channel was mainly oriented towards family audiences, unlike its sister channel FX which was aimed at young males.

== History ==
Fox was added to TVA in Brazil in September 1994, one year after the channel launched in Spanish-speaking countries in the region. On May 4, 1998, the channel split itself from the Latin American version. From March 1, 1999, the channel started selling ad slots by itself, up until then, it had entrusted its advertising services to Globosat. It had also signed an agreement with DreamWorks International Television to supply television series. A further package of 40 movies was also part of the deal, valid from July 2000. For the 2002 election period, the channel had special rates for advertisers in the slots reserved for political campaigns on over-the-air networks. That same year, it also aired Ilha da Sedução, Brazilian version of Temptation Island, by arrangement with SBT, with Fox airing the reality show on a one-day delay. The channel also aired soccer matches in 2003, as a side effect of the delays in launching the Brazilian version of Fox Sports.

Between the 90s and 2000s, Fox Brazil divided its programming in theme blocks, being: Sci-Fox (action movies, often during prime time), Fox Life (female content, which ended due to the start of the linear channel, with its vacated slot being replaced by Cine Fox Delas, in the afternoon), Não Perturbe! (adult animation with shows such as Family Guy, King of the Hill, Futurama and The Simpsons), Domingo Animado (kids), Meu CineFox Sofá (movie premieres), Séries Clássicas (old series), Domingo Gargalhada (comedy series), CineFox X2 (double feature) e Mega Weekend (weekend premieres). With the launch of FX in 2005, the Não Perturbe! block is moved to the new channel along with the cartoons in it, but King of the Hill, Futurama and The Simpsons remained on Fox's schedule with new episodes during prime time and reruns in alternate days and timeslots, but with The Simpsons gaining a two-hour nightly block of episodes, from 8 to 10pm.

On July 5, 2007, Fox Brazil decided to move to a 100%-dubbed format after observing a greater interest from the public in movies and shows in this format, months later it adopted a dual audio system to pander to all viewers.

On June 2, 2014, Fox Latin American Channels launched Fox Brazil's HD feed as independent from National Geographic Channel's, becoming a 24-hour simulcast. Its SD feed started broadcasting in 16:9 letterbox at the same time. The shared Nat Geo/Fox HD was shut down in Latin America, but in Brazil, it continued operating until November 3, 2014, being gradually replaced by Fox and National Geographic's HD feeds.

On February 5, 2017, the Fox channels left Sky's line.up for a week, and due to a lack of understanding between the two companies, the channel was replaced by Discovery Science. On February 11, 2017, Fox resumed broadcasting on Sky after renewing its contract with the operator.

Former logo as Fox Channel from 2018 until 2021

In November 2018, the channel was rebranded as Fox Channel, following a new patterning scheme. In March 2019, it became a subsidiary of The Walt Disney Company after it acquired 21st Century Fox. However, Disney wouldn't take over distribution rights until May 6, 2020, after Cade decided to revise the takeover process, as the sale wasn't achieved on time.

On November 27, 2020, Disney announced that they would be renaming the Fox branded channels in Latin America to Star on 22 February 2021 to avoid confusion with Fox Corporation. The change did not affect its programming, causing only the renaming of its theme blocks (Fox Cine to Star Cine, Fox Cine Fun to Star Cine Fun, Cine Fox Prime to Star Cine Prime, Mega Weekend Fox to Star Mega Weekend, Fox Cine Belas to Star Cine Belas, Cine Fox Action to Star Cine Action and Disney Junior no Fox Channel to Disney Junior no Star Channel), without changing its content.

On September 19, 2021, The Simpsons had its airtime reduced, ceasing to air daily, moving to a weekly timeslot, at 5pm on Sundays and 10:30pm on Mondays and changing the name of the Não Perturbe! block to Sessião Amarela. On January 31, 2023, the series returned to daily airings, occupying the 9pm slot (as it was before) from Monday to Friday, with a four-episode, two-hour additional block of reruns on Sundays at 1pm. On August 16, the series left the channel after 29 years on air, as a strategy to impulse Disney+. In August 2024, after complaints, the series returned to the schedule, but in a midnight slot.

On December 2, 2024, The Walt Disney Company announced that Star Channel would end in Brazil along with its sister channels (except for its ESPN channels) on February 28, 2025, due to high operational costs in the respective country, the dwindling pay TV ratings in Brazil and the Brazilian pay TV crisis.
