= Cinecanal =

Latin American pay television channel

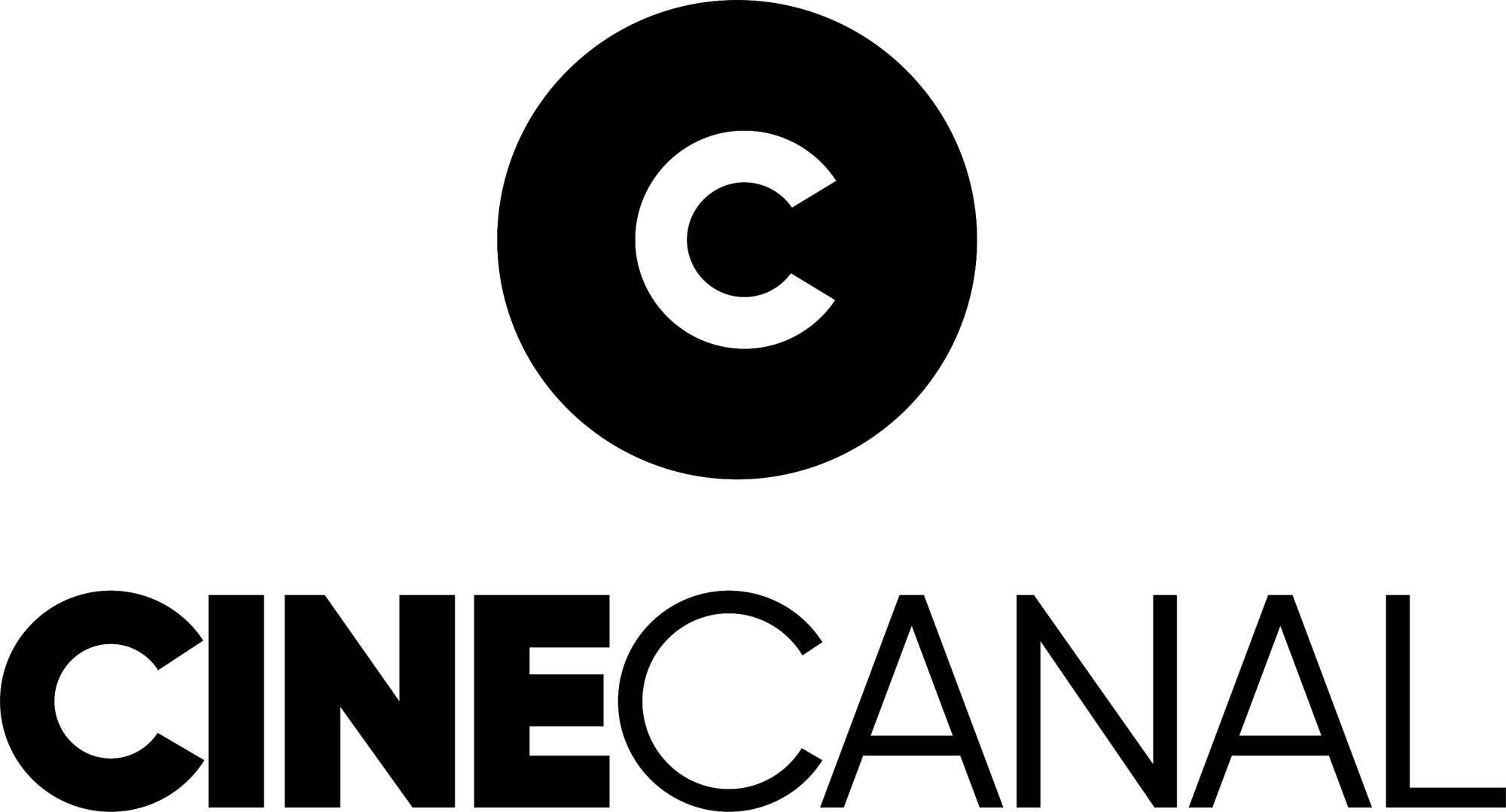
- Broadcast area: Latin America
- Headquarters: Argentina; Chile; Colombia; Mexico; Peru

Programming
- Languages: Spanish; English (as an optional audio track)
- Picture format: HDTV 1080i (downscaled to 16:9 480i/576i for the SDTV feed)

Ownership
- Owner: LAPTV (1993—2013); Fox Networks Group Latin America (2013—2019); Disney Media Networks Latin America (2019—present)
- Parent: 21st Century Fox (2013—2019); The Walt Disney Company Latin America (2019—present); (under Disney International Operations)
- Sister channels: Disney Channel; Disney Jr.; FX; National Geographic; Star Channel

History
- Launched: 1 April 1993; 33 years ago 1 April 2022; 4 years ago (Brazil)
- Closed: 1 March 2025; 20 months ago (only Brazil)

Cinecanal is an American-managed Latin American pan-regional cable television channel launched on April 1, 1993. It is owned by The Walt Disney Company Latin America, a subsidiary of the Disney International Operations division of The Walt Disney Company.

== History ==
The channel is dedicated to films. It began on 1 April 1993.

On November 27, 2020, Disney announced that it would rename the Fox channels in Latin America to Star on 22 February 2021. This change will not affect FX, National Geographic, FXM, Cinecanal or Fox Sports Channels.

In early April 2022, Cinecanal was launched in Brazil, as a replacement for Star Life, which shut down across the region.

On December 2, 2024, The Walt Disney Company announced that Cinecanal would shut down in Brazil along with its sister channels (except for its ESPN channels) on February 28, 2025. In Hispanic America, the channel will continue to operate.
