= Morko y Mali =

Argentine TV series

- Genre: Adventure; Comedy; Musical
- Written by: Alberto Fasce; Paula Varela
- Directed by: Andrés G. Schaer
- Starring: Tomás Ottaviano; Agustina Vera; Daiana Traversa Farias; Leandro Casas Silva; Florencia Diacono; Daniel Moschino
- Country of origin: Argentina
- Original language: Spanish
- No. of seasons: 2
- No. of episodes: 52

Production
- Producer: Maria Laura Moure
- Production locations: Buenos Aires, Argentina
- Cinematography: Miguel Abal
- Editors: Laura Palotini; Paloma Schnitzer (season 1, 2016); Rocío Casas Maldonado (season 2, 2017); Soledad Martínez (season 2, 2017)
- Running time: 22 minutes
- Production company: Metrovision Producciones S.A.

Original release
- Network: Disney Junior
- Release: 16 July 2016 – 15 December 2017

Morko y Mali is an Argentine children's television series, produced by Metrovision Producciones S.A. was broadcast by Disney Junior Latin America on 16 July 2016 and ended on 15 December 2017. On 17 November 2020, the series is available on Disney+.

== Plot ==
Morko and his sister Mali help the animals that inhabit the jungle around them. Meanwhile, they learn about mathematics and how to preserve the natural environment.

== Cast & characters ==
- Tomás Ottaviano as Morko
- Agustina Vera as Mali
- Dalana Traversa Farias as Únana
- Daniel Moschini as Dosdo
- Florencia Diacono as Tresia
- Leandro Casas Silva as Cuatricio

=== Puppet performers ===
- Alma Delia Pérez as Guga
- Gerardo Becker as Tulu and the Luminoso #1
- Eduardo Partida as Kamo
- Sergio Zaldívar as Sopa
- Octavio Rojas as Tuti
- Raymundo Armijo as Toto and the Luminoso #3
- Gerardo Velázquez as Tito, Luminín and the Luminoso #2
- Erika Ugalde as Gala
- Sonia Casillas as Niki
- Ulises Maynardo as Silas

== List of episodes ==
=== Season 1 (2016) ===
1. La Carrera De Las Caracolas (Parte 1)
2. La Carrera De Las Caracolas (Parte 2)
3. Un Desfile Luminoso
4. Un Collar de Plumas
5. El Gran Plan
6. El Día de los Amigos de La Selva
7. El Secreto de los Instrumentos Perdidos
8. ¿Quién quiere ser Invisible?
9. Los Tres Monosqueteros
10. Achís, Dijo Guga
11. Una Serenata para Gala
12. La Guga colgante
13. El Baile de los Plátanos
14. Un Atrapasueños para Unana
15. ¿Cómo Desbaratar un Trabalenguas?
16. Niki y Gala tienen visitas
17. Un Retrato para Morko
18. Una Sopa para Sopa
19. El Fantasma
20. Atrapado de las Alturas
21. El Tresimbao de Tresia
22. El Jardín de Bailarín
23. El Desfile de los Selvidisfraces
24. ¿Queremos Saber?
25. Los Carteles Perdidos
26. El Ritmo de la Selva

=== Season 2 (2017) ===
1. El Morko Equivocado
2. El Coco más rico de la Selva
3. Malinieves y los tres monanos
4. La Competencia de trompos
5. Perfume a pie
6. Los Zapatos bailarines
7. Un té relajante por favor
8. Marcianos en la selva
9. Un día de pícnic
10. Operativo burbojoso
11. La balsa rota
12. El monomóvil de Tito
13. Con los pelos de punta
14. ¿Para quién es el regalo?
15. Una Sorpresa para Santa
16. En busca de la priprioca
17. El más fuerte de la Selva
18. Encerrados en la cueva
19. Misión Rescate
20. No soy yo
21. Pasarán Pasarán
22. El Tótem se atascó
23. Quisiera ser como tú
24. Un tesoro para Tulú
25. Resfriarse es un mal plan
26. La Fruta de lo contrario

== Soundtrack ==
Morko y Mali - Aventuras en la selva

Soundtrack album by Various artists
- Released: 21 October 2016
- Genres: Children's; Soundtrack
- Length: 28:22
- Language: Spanish
- Label: Walt Disney

The soundtrack was released by the Walt Disney Records, on CD and digital streaming on 21 October 2016 contains 12 songs.

Track listing

| No. | Title | Length |
|---|---|---|
| 1. | "La aventura es un pacer" | 02:30 |
| 2. | "Trabajando todos juntos" | 02:14 |
| 3. | "Vengan a la selva" | 02:23 |
| 4. | "Canción de Guga" | 02:18 |
| 5. | "La canción de Tulú ofensido" | 02:09 |
| 6. | "Niki y Gala, las delfines" | 02:20 |
| 7. | "Si sigo comiendo de más" | 02:23 |
| 8. | "Lumi, luminosos" | 02:10 |
| 9. | "Amigos pequeños, amigos grandes" | 02:28 |
| 10. | "Soy el sapo Sopa" | 02:30 |
| 11. | "El río rápido" | 01:52 |
| 12. | "Qué bueno que somos hermanos" | 03:04 |
| Total length: | | 28:22 |
