= El Jardín de Clarilú =

Argentine children's television series

- Genre: Musical; Mystery; Children's; Educational
- Created by: Carlos Terán
- Written by: Paula Varela (40 episodes, 2011–2014); Inés Cuesta (30 episodes, 2014)
- Directed by: Andrés Boero; Diego Kantor; Fernando Gatti
- Starring: Agustina Cabo; Thomas Lepera; Leandro Zanardi; Andrés Espinel; Sophie Oliver
- Theme music composer: Florencia Ciarlo; Eduardo Frigerio; Federico San Millám; Paula Varela; Inés Cuesta
- Opening theme: AEIOU, by Leandro Zanardi, Andrés Espinel, Sophie Oliver and Agustina Cabo
- Ending theme: AEIOU (Instrumental)
- Country of origin: Argentina
- Original language: Spanish
- No. of seasons: 3
- No. of episodes: 100

Production
- Executive producer: Roly Candino
- Producer: María Laura Moure
- Production locations: Buenos Aires, Federal District, Argentina
- Cinematography: Miguel Abal; Leandro Martínez; Hans Bonato
- Editors: José Luis Ghezzi (55 episodes, 2011–2014); Soledad Martinez (55 episodes, 2011–2014); Gerardo Pérez (55 episodes, 2011–2014); Laura Palottini (30 episodes, 2014); Gianni Di Lillo (25 episodes, 2011–2013); Hugo Roldán (25 episodes, 2011–2013)
- Running time: 13 minutes
- Production company: Metrovision Producciones S.A. Walt Disney Television Argentina

Original release
- Network: Disney Junior
- Release: April 1, 2011 – December 12, 2014

El Jardín de Clarilú (translated in English as Clarilu's Garden) is an Argentine children's television series, produced by Metrovision Producciones S.A. was broadcast by Disney Junior Latin America on April 1, 2011, and ended on December 12, 2014. The series was the first original production by Disney Junior Latin America.

The series was released on the streaming service Disney+ on January 8, 2021, just the two seasons.

== Plot ==
The series shows a little girl named Clarilú who solves several mysteries that happen in her garden, along with her best friend Lápiz, a pencil dog.

The series follows a strict formula, where Clarilú receives an anonymous letter at the beginning of the episode, which encourages her to find a lost object and find out who sent the letter.

== Argument ==
On their tour, Clarilú and Lápiz receive help from their friends: an aviator postman named Pipo and his giant dragonfly Loli, a group of colorful butterflies, a wise spider named Griselda, 2 pond ducks named Cuac and Duvet and a flock of musicians known as the “ABCs” traveling on the shell of a giant, colorful snail named Roco.

During this tour, spectators are invited to interact with the story by participating in the search for the mysterious character, encouraging the implantation of the analytical-synthetic thought that is put into practice before any problem solving situation. The keys presented stimulate the learning of letters and words of songs, rhymes and educational games.

The Garden of Clarilu stimulates pre-reading and initial reading skills. The dynamics of the story, the setting and the original characters favor implicit learning, as, while the child's attention is focused on the story, he makes contact and incorporates concepts of reading and writing in a dynamic and fun way.

The Garden of Clarilu encourages small viewers to show their skills in solving logical problems and accompanies them in the initial learning of written reading, adding valuable tools to the future school development of them.

== Cast and characters ==
- Agustina Cabo as Clarilú
- Thomas Lepera as Pipo
- Leandro Zanardi as A
- Andrés Espinel as B
- Sophie Oliver as C
- Martín Palladino as Leo

=== Voice cast ===
- Javier Cancino as Lápiz, Clarilú's dog
- Carmen Sarahí as Loli, the dragonfly
- Carolina Ayala as Irina, the pink butterfly
- Moisés Palacios as Cuac, the duck
- Luis Daniel Ramírez as Duvet, the duck
- Alma Delia Pérez as Griselda, the spider
- Arturo Valdemar as Mariposas arco-iris 1
- Analiz Sánchez as Mariposas arco-iris 2
- Juan Carlos Tinoco as Roco, the giant snail and friend of the ABC band
- Erika Ugalde as Rana Rufina

== Soundtrack ==
El Jardín de Clarilú

Soundtrack album by Various Artists
- Released: August 2, 2011
- Studio: Estudios Néctar (Argentina)
- Genres: Soundtrack; Children's
- Length: 27:02
- Language: Spanish
- Label: Walt Disney
- Director: Eduardo Frigerio (orchestral)
- Producer: Eduardo Frigerio

The soundtrack was released in Argentina on August 2, 2011, in the form of CD, by Walt Disney Records in Spanish.

The album contains fun musical themes, presented along the Clarilu (with Agustina Cabo) and the ABC band (with Leandro Zanardi, Andrés Espinel and Sophie Oliver). This Walt Disney Records communications includes 15 unpublished themes that stimulate the imagination and offer fundamental lessons for young children's development. The songs recreate some of the most significant moments of the series.

Each episode presents musical ratings performed by the ABC band (with Leandro Zanardi, Andrés Espinel and Sophie Oliver), as well as a themed musical cutting closure.

Track listing

No.	Title	Writer(s)	Performer(s)	Length
1.	"AEIOU"	Eduardo Frigerio	Agustina Cabo, Leandro Zanardi, Andrés Espinel and Sophie Oliver	01:55
2.	"A Cuidar"	Eduardo Frigerio	Agustina Cabo	01:00
3.	"¡Yo soy Pipo!"	Eduardo Frigerio and Jorge Edelstein	Thomas Lepera, Leandro Zanardi, Andrés Espinel and Sophie Oliver	02:45
4.	"Quiero una ensalada"	Eduardo Frigerio, Paula Varela, Florencia Nosso, Victória Suárez Battán and Florencia Ciarlo	Leandro Zanardi, Andrés Espinel, Sophie Oliver, Agustina Cabo and Alma Delia Pérez	02:28
5.	"Racconto"	Eduardo Frigerio, Inés Cuesta, Florencia Mosso and Jorge Edelstein	Leandro Zanardi, Andrés Espinel and Sophie Oliver	01:06
6.	"Fruti Fruti Frutas"	Eduardo Frigerio, Paula Varela, Florencia Mosso and Florencia Ciarlo	Leandro Zanardi, Andrés Espinel, Sophie Oliver and Juan Carlos Tinoco	02:25
7.	"Primavera en el Jardín"	Eduardo Frigerio, Paula Varela, Florencia Mosso, Jorge Edelstein and Florencia Ciarlo	Agustina Cabo, Leandro Zanardi, Andrés Espinel and Sophie Oliver	02:15
8.	"Colores y más Colores"	Eduardo Frigerio, Inés Cuesta, Florencia Mosso, Jorge Edelstein and Florencia Ciarlo	Leandro Zanardi, Andrés Espinel, Sophie Oliver, Agustina Cabo and Alma Delia Pérez	02:09
9.	"A Contar Cantando"	Eduardo Frigerio, Paula Varela, Florencia Mosso and Florencia Ciarlo	Leandro Zanardi, Andrés Espinel, Sophie Oliver, Thomas Lepera and Agustina Cabo	03:00
10.	"¿Quién será?"	Eduardo Frigerio	Agustina Cabo	00:22
11.	"Canción de Griselda"	Eduardo Frigerio	Alma Delia Pérez	00:55
12.	"Muy Feliz"	Eduardo Frigerio, Inés Cuesta, Florencia Mosso, Jorge Edelstein and Florencia Ciarlo	Leandro Zanardi, Andrés Espinel, Sophie Oliver, Thomas Lepera and Carmen Sarahi	01:35
13.	"Cometas"	Eduardo Frigerio and Jorge Edelstein	Leandro Zanardi, Andrés Espinel and Sophie Oliver	01:23
14.	"Los triángulos suenan"	Eduardo Frigerio, Paula Varela, Florencia Mosso and Florencia Ciarlo	Leandro Zanardi, Andrés Espinel and Sophie Oliver	02:25
15.	"Jugando a la escondida"	Eduardo Frigerio, Inés Cuesta, Florencia Mosso and Florencia Ciarlo	Leandro Zanardi, Andrés Espinel and Sophie Oliver	02:00
Total length:				27:02

=== El Jardín de Clarilú 2 ===
El Jardín de Clarilú 2

Soundtrack album by Various Artists
- Released: November 23, 2012
- Studio: Estudios Néctar (Argentina)
- Genres: Soundtrack; Children's
- Length: 34:47
- Language: Spanish
- Label: Walt Disney
- Director: Eduardo Frigerio (orchestra); Katie Viqueira (vocal)

El Jardín de Clarilú 2 is the second soundtrack of the television series of the same name, was released on November 23, 2012 by Walt Disney Records in Argentina, including the letter game (inside the CD booklet).

Track listing

No.	Title	Writer(s)	Performer(s)	Length
1.	"Canción de los Amigos"	Eduardo Frigerio, Federico San Millan, Florencia Mosso and Paula Varela	Carolina Ayala, Moisés Palacios, Leonardo Zanardi, Andrés Espinel, Sophie Oliver, Thomas Lepera, Juan Carlos Tinoco, Luis Daniel Ramirez and Agustina Cabo	02:20
2.	"Plop, una Burbuja"	Eduardo Frigerio, Florencia Ciarlo, Paula Varela, Jorge Edelstein and Florencia Mosso	Leandro Zanardi, Andrés Espinel, Sophie Oliver and Agustina Cabo	03:02
3.	"Cachata Cha Cha"	Eduardo Frigerio, Florencia Ciarlo, Paula Varela and Inés Cuesta	Leandro Zanardi, Andrés Espinel, Sophie Oliver and Agustina Cabo	03:10
4.	"Somos los ABC"	Eduardo Frigerio, Federico San Millan, Florencia Mosso and Jorge Edelstein	Leandro Zanardi, Andrés Espinel and Sophie Oliver	03:11
5.	"Me Gusta Viajar"	Eduardo Frigerio and Federico San Millan	Leandro Zanardi, Andrés Espinel, Sophie Oliver, Carolina Ayala, Moisés Palacios and Luis Daniel Ramirez	02:56
6.	"Todos es Diversión"	Eduardo Frigerio, Florencia Ciarlo and Jorge Edelstein	Leandro Zanardi, Andres Espinel, Sophie Oliver and Agustina Cabo	01:56
7.	"Al Tobogán"	Eduardo Frigerio, Florencia Ciarlo, Jorge Edelstein and Florencia Mosso	Leandro Zanardi, Andrés Espinel, Sophie Oliver and Agustina Cabo	02:33
8.	"A Mover el Cuerpo"	Eduardo Frigerio, Federico San Millan and Florencia Mosso	Leandro Zanardi, Andrés Espinel, Sophie Oliver and Thomas Lepera	02:13
9.	"Perder o Ganar"	Eduardo Frigerio, Florencia Ciarlo, Florencia Mosso and Victoria Suarez Battan	Moisés Palacios, Leandro Zanardi, Andrés Espinel, Sophie Oliver and Luis Daniel Ramirez	02:08
10.	"Uy, Qué Me Pongo"	Eduardo Frigerio and Florencia Ciarlo	Leandro Zanardi, Andrés Espinel and Sophie Oliver	02:06
11.	"Pensar, Pensar"	Eduardo Frigerio, Federico San Millan and Florencia Mosso	Leandro Zanardi, Andrés Espinel, Sophie Oliver and Agustina Cabo	02:53
12.	"Oh, Cuánto Amor"	Eduardo Frigerio, Florencia Ciarlo, Paula Varela and Florencia Mosso	Leandro Zanardi, Andrés Espinel, Sophie Oliver, Thomas Lepera and Luis Daniel Ramirez	02:30
13.	"Murciélago Despertador"	Eduardo Frigerio, Florencia Ciarlo, Inés Cuesta and Florencia Mosso	Leandro Zanardi, Andrés Espinel, Sophie Oliver and Agustina Cabo	02:28
14.	"Para Dormir, Para Soñar"	Eduardo Frigerio, Florencia Ciarlo and Inés Cuesta	Leandro Zanardi, Andrés Espinel, Sophie Oliver and Agustina Cabo	02:15
Total length:				34:47

== Awards ==
Year	Award	Category	Nominee	Ref.
2013	International Emmy Kids Awards	Educational/Instructional Television Program	El Jardín de Clarilú	
