= Disney XD (Latin America) =

Latin American pay television channel

- Final logo used from June 12, 2015 to March 31, 2022.
- Country: Argentina; Mexico
- Broadcast area: Latin America; Caribbean
- Headquarters: Buenos Aires; Mexico City; Bogotá; Santiago

Programming
- Languages: Spanish; English (only via SAP audio track)
- Picture format: HDTV 1080i; SDTV 480i/576i (downscaled)

Ownership
- Owner: Disney Media Networks Latin America
- Parent: The Walt Disney Company Latin America
- Sister channels: Disney Channel; Disney Jr.

History
- Launched: November 8, 1996; 29 years ago (as Fox Kids); August 1, 2004; 22 years ago (as Jetix); July 3, 2009; 17 years ago (as Disney XD)
- Closed: April 1, 2022; 4 years ago
- Replaced by: Disney Channel (programming)
- Former names: Fox Kids Network (1996–1998); Fox Kids (1998–2004); Jetix (2004–2009)

Disney XD was a Latin American pay television channel owned by The Walt Disney Company and operated as part of Disney Branded Television. The channel served Mexico, Central America, South America, and the Caribbean, and was based on the American cable channel of the same name.

It was operated by Disney Media Networks Latin America and The Walt Disney Company Latin America. The channel was originally launched on November 8, 1996, as an international feed of Fox Kids. In 2004, it was rebranded as Jetix following Disney's acquisition of Fox Family Worldwide, and in 2009 it adopted the Disney XD brand.

== History ==
=== As Fox Kids (1996–2004) ===
Fox Kids logo used from 1998 to 2004.

The channel was launched on November 8, 1996, as Fox Kids, originally owned by Fox Kids Worldwide Inc., a joint venture of Saban Entertainment and News Corporation. It was the third international version of the network to launch after those in Australia and the United Kingdom and Ireland, and the first version in another language besides English.

Fox Kids launched on Sky México on February 4, 1997.

On July 24, 2001, FKW was sold to The Walt Disney Company for US$5.3 billion.

=== As Jetix (2004–2009) ===
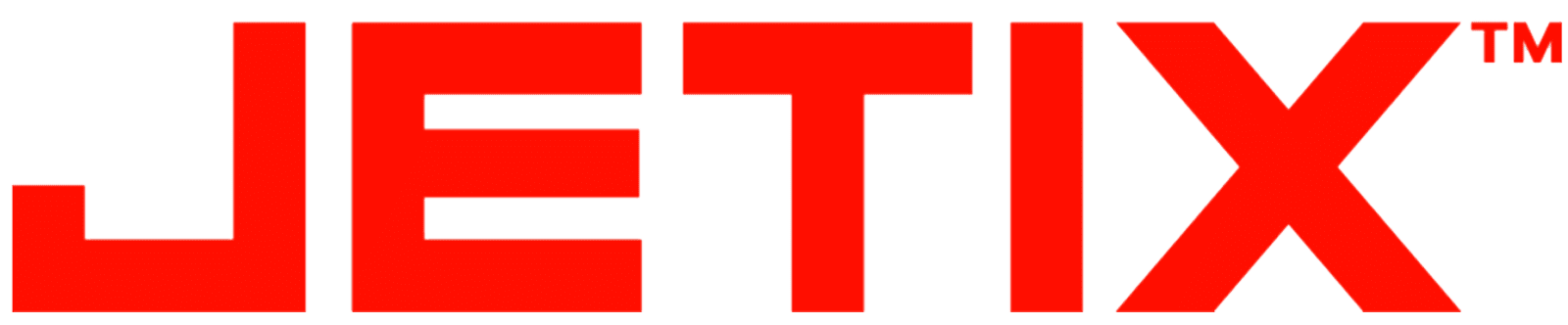
Jetix logo used from 2004 to 2009.

On August 1, 2004, the TV network transitioned to Disney's new international children's action brand, Jetix, with Disney content merged into the schedule throughout the two years before. It was the first Fox Kids network to rebrand as Jetix.

=== As Disney XD (2009–2022) ===
Disney XD logo used from 2009 to 2015.

In May 2009, after Toon Disney was rebranded to Disney XD in the United States, the Latin American-Disney branch confirmed Disney XD would replace Jetix in Latin America on July 3, 2009. On January 18, 2010, a Pacific feed was introduced for all South American Pacific countries and Bolivia outside Colombia. In August 2016, the channel moved to a full-time widescreen presentation, launching high-definition operations in each territory when technically able to. The Pacific South American feed shifted to a -1 hour feed of the eastern feed in June 2017.

The network ceased operations on April 1, 2022, with its programming shifting to Disney Channel and the streaming service Disney+.

== Feeds ==
Disney XD Latin America was split into two feeds across the region. The network's two feeds were timed to UTC–6 (identified within network promotions as Mexico City) and UTC−05:00 (identified as Bogotá or "Sureste").

== See also ==
- Disney Channel
- Disney XD
- Disney Channel (Latin America)
