= Disney Junior (Brazil) =

Defunct Brazilian pay television channel (2008-2022)

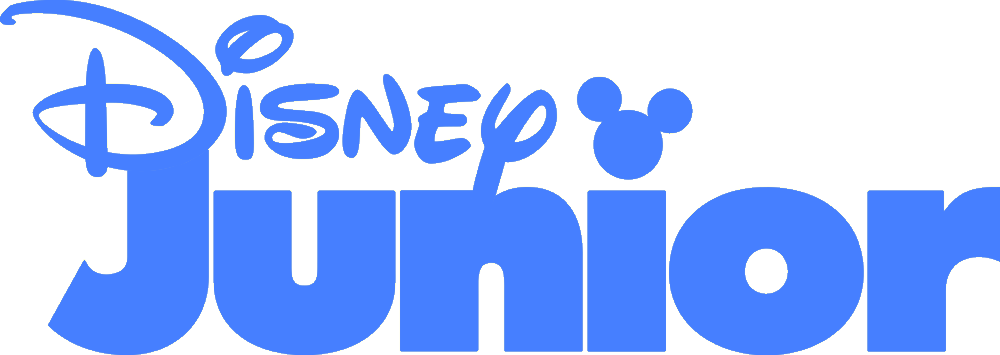
- Final logo used from November 2017 to 1 April 2022
- Broadcast area: Brazil
- Headquarters: São Paulo, Brazil

Programming
- Languages: Portuguese; English (via SAP)
- Picture format: 1080i HDTV; (downscaled to 480i for the SDTV feed)

Ownership
- Owner: The Walt Disney Company Brazil
- Parent: The Walt Disney Company Latin America

History
- Launched: 5 September 2008; 17 years ago (as Playhouse Disney)
- Closed: 1 April 2022; 4 years ago (as Disney Junior)
- Former names: Playhouse Disney (2008-2011)

Disney Junior was a Brazilian pay television channel operated by The Walt Disney Company Brazil, a part of The Walt Disney Company Latin America and the Brazilian variant of the eponymous American cable channel. Launched on 5 September 2008 and was marketed to preschoolers.

== History ==
The channel started as a programming block in the mornings of Disney Channel Brazil airing original programming focused on preschoolers. An original production, named "A Casa de Playhouse Disney" aired on the block, with two hosts reading stories and playing games with kids, as well as introducing the series.

On 5 September 2008, The Walt Disney Company Brazil launched Playhouse Disney Channel as a 24-hour independent channel in Brazil, with the TV operators TVA and Telefônica TV Digital.

In December 2008, it began to be distributed by the Via Embratel operator. In February 2009, it began to be shown on the pay TV operator Nossa TV, instead of TVE Spain. It was also available on Oi TV, Algar TV and Vivo TV.

On 23 December 2010, The Walt Disney Company announced that the channel would be replaced by Disney Junior in 2011, and the relaunch occurred on 1 April 2011. On 4 November 2014, it began to be shown on Sky in HD on channel 295. Sky was the first pay TV operator in Brazil to broadcast the channel in HD.

The channel featured Brazilian productions such as A Casa do Disney Junior with Vinicius Campos and Estela Ribeiro aired since 2011 until 2013, Plim Plim and O Diário de Mika premiered in 2015 or Os Óculos Mágicos de Charlotte premiered in 2020.

On 10 January 2022, The Walt Disney Company announced that Disney Junior would close in Brazil on 31 March 2022 along with Disney XD, Nat Geo Kids, Nat Geo Wild and Star Life, due the company reestructuring policy and the Brazilian pay TV crisis. However, Disney Junior programs were still be shown on Disney Channel Brazil's morning block "Disney Junior no Disney Channel" (Disney Junior on Disney Channel), and the streaming service Disney+ until the shutdown of the Brazilian version of the channel on February 28, 2025.

== Website ==
The website launched on 5 September 2008, along with the channel and replacing the mini-website of the programming block on Disney Channel. Inside the website, each series had its own mini-website with information and downloads about the show. Different games and activities were also available. The users could listen to music from the shows, read stories or view programming.

== Logos ==
2008–2011

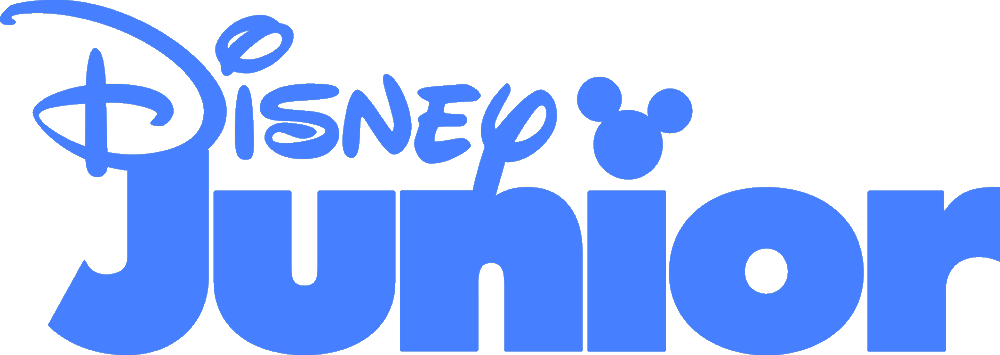
2017–2022

== See also ==
- Disney Channel (Brazil)
- Disney XD (Brazil)
- Star Channel (Brazil)
