= Star Channel (Latin America) =

Latin American pay television channel

- Broadcast area: Hispanic America
- Headquarters: Argentina; Chile; Colombia; Mexico; Peru

Programming
- Languages: Spanish; English (as an optional audio track)
- Picture format: 1080i HDTV (downscaled to 16:9 480i/576i for the channel's SDTV feeds)

Ownership
- Owner: Disney Media Networks Latin America
- Parent: The Walt Disney Company Latin America
- Sister channels: Cinecanal; Disney Channel; Disney Jr.; FX; National Geographic

History
- Launched: 14 August 1993; 33 years ago (as Fox); 22 February 2021; 5 years ago (as Star Channel)
- Former names: Fox (1993–2018); Fox Channel (2018–2021)

Star Channel (formerly known as Fox and Fox Channel) is a Latin American pay television channel operated by Disney Media Networks Latin America; part of The Walt Disney Company Latin America. The channel is mainly oriented towards family audiences, unlike its sister channel FX which is aimed at young males. Most shows retain their original English-language titles.

== History ==
The channel was originally launched as Fox, a localized version of the American television network Fox Broadcasting Company.

The Spanish-language broadcast began on 14 August 1993 and the Portuguese-language feed broadcast began on 17 September 1994.

The channel took part in the worldwide premiere of The Walking Dead on November 1, 2010, and the Zombie Invasion Event promotion that led up to it. After the final episode of the first season of The Walking Dead aired, Fox released the uncensored version of the first episode.

In December 2010, the channel started using the RTC ratings (Radio, Televisión y Cinematografía) in Mexico.

In November 2012, Fox including its sister channels were removed in various cable providers such as Cablevision Monterrey, and Cablemás due to contract issues. The problem with Cablevision was fixed one day later.

Former logo as Fox Channel from 2018 until 2021

In November 2018, the channel was rebranded as Fox Channel. In March 2019, it became a subsidiary of The Walt Disney Company after it acquired 21st Century Fox.

On November 27, 2020, Disney announced that they would be renaming the Fox branded channels in Latin America to Star on 22 February 2021 to avoid confusion with Fox Corporation.

On December 2, 2024, The Walt Disney Company announced that Star Channel would end in Brazil along with its sister channels (except for its ESPN channels) on February 28, 2025. In Hispanic America, the channel will continue to operate.

== Programming ==
=== Star MegaWeekend ===
MegaWeekend is a weekend block in which the most popular series of Star Channel Latin America are aired such as The Simpsons, followed by a film.

=== ¡No Molestar! ===
¡No Molestar! (Do Not Disturb!) is a prime time block that started airing in 2005. It airs reruns of Futurama and The Simpsons. The block replaced "Domingo Animado" (Animated Sunday). Commonly, three to four episodes of The Simpsons and one episode of Futurama are aired. The block is mainly focused on teenagers and adults. The block is slightly based on the formula of Animation Domination, although some shows like Bob's Burgers and Family Guy air in FX Latin America's ¡No Molestar! block.

In 2006, to celebrate its 1st anniversary, it launched an internet competition, to vote on the most crazy video created by the viewers. In the same year its name was changed temporarily to ¡No Molestar! Mundial to celebrate the 2006 FIFA World Cup.

In 2007, the block was included in their sister network, FX, but was eventually removed from in 2011.

In September 2021, the length of the block was reduced from two hours to one.

=== Star Cine ===
Star Cine (formerly CineFOX) is a block that is aired every day. It features films.

=== Hora Hulu ===
Hora Hulu it is a block released on October 8, 2025 (the same day the Hulu brand arrives in the region) to airs original series from Hulu on Disney+.

== Sister channels ==
Through the commercial success, other channels associated with Star (formerly Fox) have been released:

- FX (Latin American TV channel): The channel is a counterpart of the flagship FX channel. Many shows which were broadcast on Fox have been moved to FX, such as Prison Break and Bones. The channel is mainly orientated to male audiences.
- Star Life (Latin American TV channel) (formerly Fox Life): It was orientated mainly to female audiences. Closed on April 1, 2022.
- Star Premium (Formerly Fox Premium): Closed on February 1, 2022.
