= Star Life (Latin America) =

International television channel

- Country: Latin America
- Broadcast area: Latin America; The Caribbean

Programming
- Languages: Spanish; Portuguese; English (as an optional audio track)
- Picture format: 1080i HDTV (downscaled to 16:9 480i/576i for the SDTV feed)

Ownership
- Owner: News Corporation (2005-2012); 21st Century Fox (2013-2019; under Fox International Channels Latin America); The Walt Disney Company Latin America (2019-2022; under Disney International Operations)
- Sister channels: Cinecanal FX FXM Star Channel

History
- Launched: 1 October 2005; 21 years ago; as Fox Life; 22 February 2021; 5 years ago; as Star Life
- Replaced by: Cinecanal (Brazil only)
- Former names: Utilisima(1996–2013); Fox Life (2005–2021)

Star Life (formerly known as Fox Life) is a pay television network in Latin America, launched by the Fox Networks Group in 2005. The network's scheduling varied with each version, ranging from traditional entertainment programming, including television series, sitcoms and films.

Star Life is operated by Disney Media Networks Latin America and The Walt Disney Company Latin America, both of which are owned by The Walt Disney Company.

== History ==
During the first years of the launch, Fox Life had a varied programming grid that consisted of soap operas, comedies, dramas, films and cooking shows, which was considered the counterpart of the FX channel with aim of attracting a female audience.

On November 4, 2013, the channel was relaunched by merging it with the Utilísima channel, orienting the programming to the lifestyle with 70% original production and 30% acquired.

By then, the channel's programming was made up of series and films aimed at young and adult audiences, with productions that stood out in the leading roles.

Former logo used as Fox Life from 2017 until 2021

On November 27, 2020, Disney announced that they would be renaming the Fox branded channels in Latin America to Star on February 22, 2021.

On January 10, 2022, it was announced that the Latin American version of Star Life would be shut down on March 31 along with several other networks in the region. A domestic version of Cinecanal was its direct replacement in Brazil.

== Programming ==
In Latin America, the channel aired soaps. It aired Telefe and Record soap operas from Brazil and Argentina, respectively. The channel also featured mostly cooking shows and reality series on the Latin American service. When the current format was launched, it was with the exception of Brazil, where the channel aired, from 8 a.m. to 7 p.m., content from Utilisima and original shows for the local audience, as Bem Simples, and, from 7 p.m. to 8 a.m., reality series seen on the Fox Life service elsewhere in the region (most non-original cooking shows are not seen on the Brazilian service since the rights are held by GNT). On February 28, 2011, with the launch of the Bem Simples channel in Brazil, all Bem Simples/Utilisima content moved to that channel.

== See also ==
- Fox Life
