= Natalie Ravitz =

American business executive (born 1978)

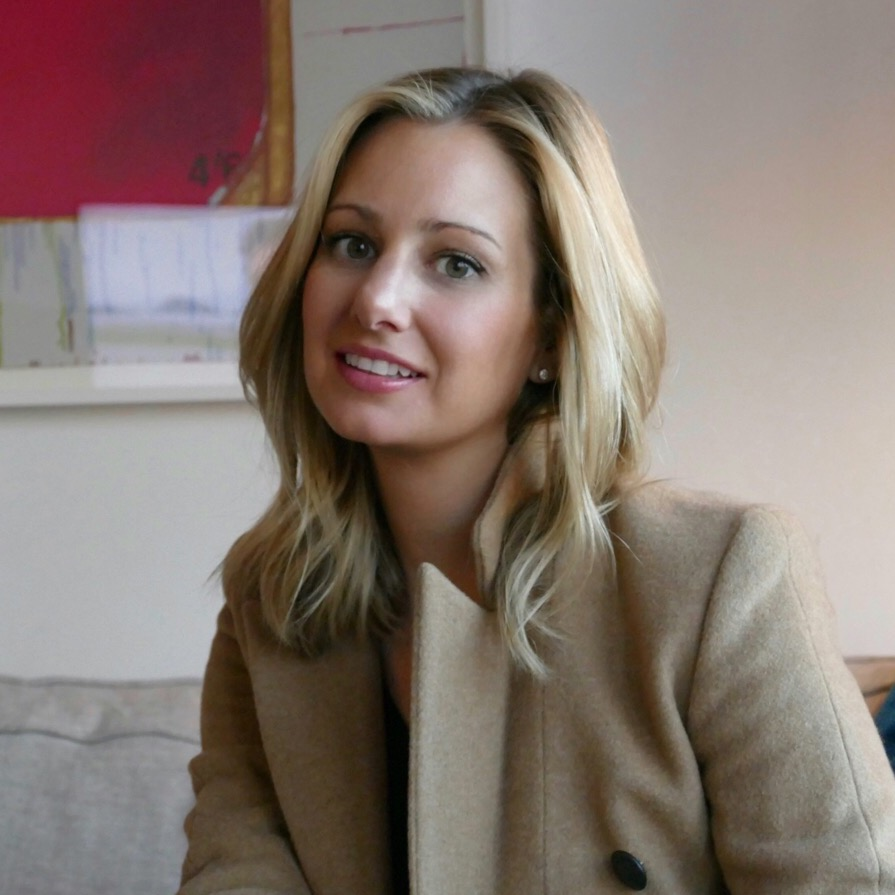
- Born: December 1, 1978 (age 47)
- Education: University of Michigan (BA)
- Occupation: Business executive
- Employer: Related Companies
- Known for: Rupert Murdoch's chief of staff
- Title: Executive vice president of corporate communications

Natalie Ravitz (born December 1, 1978) is an American business executive. She was the senior vice president of communications for the National Football League (NFL). Previously, Ravitz was Rupert Murdoch's Chief of Staff at 21st Century Fox and News Corp for three and a half years, tacking on additional responsibilities as senior vice president for strategy towards the end of her tenure. During her time at 21st Century Fox, Ravitz created the popular Tumblr account "Murdoch Here", which was covered by numerous media outlets. Prior to this position, Ravitz was the communications director for the New York City Department of Education and a prominent staffer for United States Senators Barbara Boxer and Paul Wellstone.

== Political career ==
Natalie Ravitz started her career as a press secretary for U.S. Senator Paul Wellstone's re-election campaign, a position she held until November 2002, the month after Wellstone died in a plane crash along with 7 others.

From February 2003 until December 2005, Ravitz was the press secretary and speechwriter in the Office of U.S. Senator Barbara Boxer. In January 2006, she was promoted to the position of communications director for Senator Barbara Boxer.

In June 2010, Ravitz shifted her focus from national to local politics when she was appointed communications director for the New York City Department of Education—the largest public school system in the country, with 1.1 million students. In her capacity as communications director, Ravitz was frequently tasked with deflecting criticism aimed at city education officials, and she authored numerous articles in The Huffington Post defending city policies from attacks.

== 21st Century Fox and News Corp ==
In February 2012, Ravitz accepted a position to become Rupert Murdoch's chief of staff at News Corporation, which later split into two separate, publicly traded companies. As part of this role, Ravitz advised Murdoch on strategic, operational, financial, and reputational issues related to company-operated businesses around the world, including but not limited to the Fox Broadcasting Network, Twentieth Century Fox Film, Fox News, and Fox International Channels. In addition, Ravitz worked closely with Murdoch and the “new” News Corp executives on issues related to the management of the businesses owned and operated by News Corp, including The Wall Street Journal, News Corp Australia, News UK, the New York Post and HarperCollins.

A serial social media user, Ravitz created the popular Tumblr account "Murdoch Here", which visually documented Murdoch's travels, meetings, and routines. This account, as well as her tweets about Murdoch, has been covered by various media outlets such as Quartz, The Guardian, and TechCrunch among others.

In June 2015, Murdoch sent a memo to his team announcing that Ravitz was stepping down from her role as Murdoch's chief of staff in order to pursue "a leadership operating position" either internally at 21st Century Fox or externally. In the memo, Murdoch said of Ravitz, "I cannot say enough about the exceptional job Natalie has done for me, giving valued support across many functions ... She is immensely talented and able, and has greatly benefited me and our companies."

== 2016–present ==
In 2016, Ravitz joined the National Football League (NFL) as senior vice president of communications. In May 2018, she was made chief communications officer of Oath. In 2024, she joined Related Companies as the executive vice president of corporate communications and spokesperson.

== Education ==
Ravitz received her BA in English language and literature from the University of Michigan in May 2001. She studied abroad for a semester from June 1999 to September 1999 at the London School of Economics and Political Science.
