= Disney Channel (Brazil) =

Defunct Brazilian pay television channel (2001–2025)

- Final logo used from 29 July 2019 to 1 March 2025
- Country: Brazil
- Broadcast area: Brazil
- Headquarters: São Paulo, Brazil

Programming
- Languages: Portuguese; English (as an optional audio track)
- Picture format: 1080i HDTV (downscaled to 16:9 480i for the SDTV feed)

Ownership
- Owner: The Walt Disney Company Brazil
- Parent: The Walt Disney Company Latin America

History
- Launched: 5 April 2001; 25 years ago
- Closed: 1 March 2025; 20 months ago

Links
- Website: disney.com.br/tv

Disney Channel was a Brazilian children's pay television channel operated by The Walt Disney Company Brazil, a part of The Walt Disney Company Latin America and the local Brazilian version of the Disney Channel. It launched as a premium channel on 5 April 2001, and became a basic-tier channel in 2004. The channel closed after 23 years on 1 March 2025, along with other non-sports Disney channels in Brazil.

== History ==
The Walt Disney Company was preparing the channel for Brazil as early as 1997 and was initially scheduled to launch in 1998. Like other international versions of the channel, it had to adapt to the local culture and find local productions.

There was an ongoing disagreement involving exclusive rights on certain channels between satellite operators DirecTV and SKY Brasil. Disney Channel became involved in potential negotiations after SKY's exclusive launch of Panamerican Sports Network and the arrival of HBO channels on DirecTV. By April 2000, no agreement had been officially reached between Disney and DirecTV. It was unlikely to be an exclusive channel on cable. In addition, Disney had not yet finished the localization efforts for the channel. In February 2001, it was announced that the channel would launch its Brazilian feed on April 5. The channel positioned itself as a family channel at launch. Local content was initially set to three hours a day, with a plan to increase it to between eight and ten hours.

The network had a reciprocal agreement with SBT. On 4 November 2001, a version of Zapping Zone premiered on the over-the-air (OTA) network, airing on Sundays. The reverse happened with Muito Mais Popstars, the Brazilian version of Popstars, with Disney Channel airing the program two days after the initial showing on SBT. On 1 July 2002, a localized Playhouse Disney block launched, with the studio segments being filmed in Buenos Aires to optimize resources. On September 1, 2002, the channel aired a Rouge concert, the band that won the first edition of SBT's Popstars.

Disney Channel left DirecTV in March 2003, after Galaxy Latin America entered Chapter 11 bankruptcy status. It was announced in December 2003 at an event held in Buenos Aires by ESPN's regional marketing team for Brazil and the Southern Cone, that Disney Channel would start carrying commercial advertising in order to become a basic channel. On January 15, 2004, Disney Channel was restored on DirecTV. In line with its plans to become a basic cable channel, the channel was promoted to basic tiers.

On 4 August 2005, it was announced in São Paulo that Disney Channel would begin broadcasting on NET, reaching 800,000 subscribers. It began broadcasting on Vivax in December. On 14 September 2006, it launched on SKY, alongside seven other channels after a merger with DirecTV. Shortly afterwards it started airing new local productions: the first season of Floribella from Band and Um Menino Muito Maluquinho, adapted from Ziraldo, which was produced for TVE Brasil. The former was distributed by RGB, which previously collaborated with Disney Channel when it had an agreement with SBT.

The success of High School Musical, which also aired on Rede Globo at the end of 2006, gave the channel unprecedentedly high ratings, as well as a 200% increase in advertising sales. Record aired the local version of the stage musical, High School Musical on Stage, at the Morumbi stadium on 24 June 2007, one week after airing on Disney Channel.

In 2009, the channel premiered Quando Toca o Sino, a localized version of the Italian show Quelli dell'intervallo. It was produced locally by Cristal Líquido.

In November 2015, it announced a local version of the Pijama Party game show, with filming beginning in December.

In 2018, it announced the premiere of Z4, simultaneously with SBT.

On 1 April 2022, its sister networks, Disney Junior and Disney XD, were shut down.

On 2 December 2024, The Walt Disney Company announced that Disney Channel would be shutting down in Brazil along with its sister channels (except for its ESPN channels) on 28 February 2025, due to high operational costs, declining ratings, and the Brazilian pay TV crisis.

On 1 March 2025, the channels were closed in Brazil. The final program shown was the Phineas and Ferb episode "Crack That Whip / The Best Lazy Day Ever". Disney Channel shows remain available in Brazil on Disney+.

== Programming ==
Series produced by Walt Disney Television Animation and Disney Channel Original Series aired on most of the schedule. Some non-original series were also aired, including Mortified, Life with Derek, The Fairly OddParents, A Kind of Magic, George of the Jungle and Um Menino Muito Maluquinho.

The Disney Junior block aired daily from the early morning until 8:30am on weekdays and 10:00am on weekends. After the Disney Junior block, a cartoon block was aired, with cartoon series produced by Walt Disney Television Animation and Disney Channel Original Series.

== Programming blocks ==
=== Zapping Zone ===
Disney Channel Brazil produced an original show called Zapping Zone, in which hosts interacted with viewers with games and trivia. It aired on weekdays and also gave news about Disney Channel, the channel's series, upcoming Walt Disney Pictures films and new Disney Channel Original Movies. Its broadcast was not live, and viewers could call to participate in games containing questions and trivia about Disney films and series. Viewers could win T-shirts and caps just for participating, with prizes for winners including DVDs, soundtracks, and video games of Disney films. This show was first aired on 27 July 2000, and ended on 26 October 2012.

The hosts of Zapping Zone presented Disney Channel Original Series, which were aired in the block as a primetime. New episodes of animated and live-action series were often aired on weekdays. Hosts also introduced new music videos or trailer premiers in this block. Other blocks included Contratempo, Metidas de Pata (Bloopers), and Sextas Xtremas (Xtreme Friday).

=== Movies ===
The O Maravilhoso Mundo de Disney (Wonderful World of Disney) block aired Disney films on weekdays after the Zapping Zone. The early-afternoon weekday film block was named Cool After School. On weekends, it was replaced with a Disney Cinemagic block. Movies were occasionally aired on Disney Junior.

This was followed by Filme Disney Channel (Disney Channel Movies), which aired Disney Channel Original Movies. It aired on Thursdays, Fridays, and Saturdays after Zapping Zone and sometimes other weekdays after Wonderful World of Disney. Some movies aired on Rede Telecine before airing on Disney Channel.

=== Holidays ===
The summer special began in December and ended in late February. It included premieres of new films and television episodes. The channel aired Halloween and Christmas specials.

The channel aired an original production. Viewers voted on the website for their favorite movies, episodes, and specials. The ones with the most votes were aired on December 31. The show was hosted by the cast of "Zapping Zone." It featured a countdown and previews of new programs coming next year. This replaced the previous block, "Popcorn."

=== Mouse, Câmera, Ação! ===
Mouse, Câmera, Ação! (Mouse, Camera, Action!) was an event aired once a month in which viewers could vote between three different movies, with the winner aired at the end of the month. Viewers could vote through the website, on mobile services, or social media. This block was discontinued in mid-2017.

=== Disney Jr. nas manhãs do Disney Channel ===
Disney Jr. nas manhãs do Disney Channel was the morning block where Disney Junior series were broadcast from 6am to 11am.

=== Sabatona ===
Sabatona (lit. 'Saturday Marathon') was a programming block that originated on Disney XD and was broadcast every Saturday. It ran a 3 hour marathon of various animated series.

== Other services ==
=== Mobile ===
In July 2008, Disney rebranded Disney Mobile to Disney Mobile Studios, with different services available. The users could download content from Disney Channel, Disney XD, Playhouse Disney Channel, Radio Disney and content from movies.

=== HD ===
Disney Channel launched in HD and widescreen on 15 December 2009. The schedule was the same but without ads. On June 9, 2017, the HD feed was renamed as Disney Channel+ and featured different programming including series from Disney XD and Disney Junior.

== Sister channels ==
=== Disney XD (closed) ===
Disney XD was a children's television channel brand owned by the Walt Disney Company broadcast in Brazil. It was previously known as Fox Kids and Jetix. The website launched on 15 May 2009 and the channel launched on 3 July 2009. It closed down on 1 April 2022.

=== Disney Junior (closed) ===
Disney Junior (Brazil) was a cable television channel marketed to preschoolers. It was operated by The Walt Disney Company Brazil and The Walt Disney Company Latin America. It was launched on 5 September 2008, as Playhouse Disney. On 1 April 2011, it was rebranded as Disney Junior. It closed down on 1 April 2022.

== Logos ==
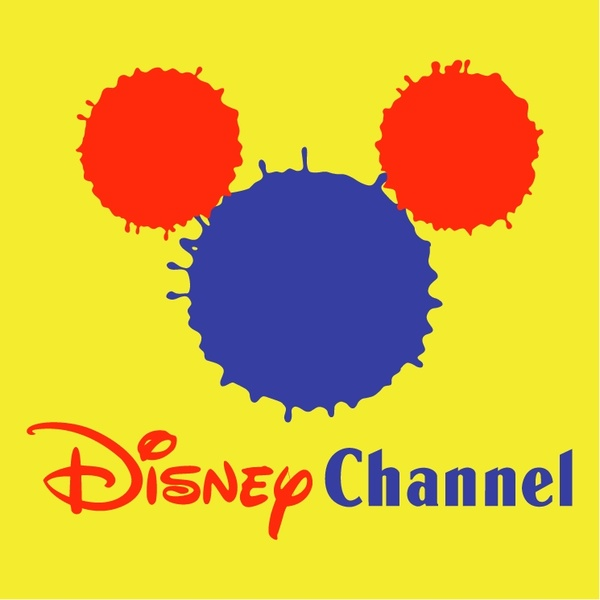
2001–2003

2003–2010

2010–2014

2014–2017

2017–2019

2019–2025

== See also ==
- Disney Junior (Brazil)
- Disney XD (Brazil)
- Star Channel (Brazil)
