= Nat Geo Kids (Latin America) =

- Broadcast area: Latin America and the Caribbean

Programming
- Languages: Spanish; Portuguese (Brazil only); English (secondary audio)
- Picture format: 1080i (HDTV) (downscaled to 16:9 480i/576i for the SDTV feed)

Ownership
- Owner: National Geographic Partners, LLC: National Geographic Society; Fox Networks Group (Walt Disney Direct-to-Consumer & International Disney Latin America)
- Sister channels: National Geographic; Nat Geo Wild

History
- Launched: April 8, 1996; 30 years ago (Latin America); October 4, 2017; 9 years ago (Brazil)
- Closed: April 1, 2022; 4 years ago
- Former names: Utilísima Satelital (1996–2001); Ultilísima (2001–2013); MundoFox (2013–2017)

Nat Geo Kids was a Latin American pay television channel targeting children ages 3 to 11, owned by Disney Channels Worldwide and National Geographic Partners, a joint venture between The Walt Disney Company and National Geographic Society.

== History and closure ==
The channel was originally launched on 8 April 1996 as Utilísima, but it was rebranded on 4 November 2013 as MundoFox. On 1 July 2017, the channel was again rebranded as Nat Geo Kids. Its Brazilian feed was launched on 4 October 2017.

On January 10, 2022, it was announced that Nat Geo Kids would close on April 1, 2022 in the region, along with many other sister networks.
