= Bem Simples =

Brazilian television channel

BemSimples
- Country: Brazil
- Broadcast area: Brazil; Argentina; Portugal
- Headquarters: São Paulo, Brazil

Programming
- Language(s): Portuguese
- Picture format: 480i (SDTV)

Ownership
- Owner: Fox International Channels; Fox International Channels Portugal (Portugal)
- Sister channels: Fox; Fox Life; FX; National Geographic Channel

History
- Launched: March 1, 2011
- Replaced: Fox Life
- Closed: June 1, 2014

Links
- Website: BemSimples

BemSimples ("Quite Simple" in English) was a Brazilian television channel owned and operated by Fox International Channels and by Fox International Channels Portugal in Portugal. The channel has programming geared primarily to entertainment, female, with programs dedicated to cuisine, fashion, babies, among other things, the program schedule consists mainly of programs 30 minutes on average.

Formerly, BemSimples was a timeshare channel distributed on Fox Life from 8 a.m. to 7 p.m between 2010 and March 1, 2011, when it gained its own channel.

The channel is a franchise channel of the Argentine Utilisima, launched in 2008, 60% of its programming is national, and 40% are dubbing the channel of the Argentine Confluence is the 12th channel of the Fox.

All programs are issuing the documents produced in Argentina.

This version is used only in Argentina

This version is used in Brazil and Portugal

In 2014, the carriage of Bem Simples was merged with Fox Life, and the network was discontinued fully at the end of May 2014.

== Programming ==
The following is a list of programs broadcast by BemSimples.

- Challenge the Chef
- Chefs on the Edge
- The Guide
- The Confectionery
- Home Express
- Brazil in Prato
- Show Baby
- Emotional Health
- Womanhood
- Everything Simple
- Men Gourmet
- Make it Home
- Homemade Kitchen
- Point and Line
- Super Express
- Easy Party
- Cooking School
- Decorate at Home
- Crafts Gallery
- Sweet Child Workshop
- Contact Physician
- Energy Feng Shui
- The Magical World of Leticia
- Yoga
- Aesthetic Center
- Palmirinha's Program
