= Two Guys Garage =

American reality television series

- Genre: Automobile
- Narrated by: Bryan Fuller; Sam Memmolo
- Country of origin: United States

Original release
- Network: Speed Channel
- Release: 2001 – 2013

Two Guys Garage is an American reality television series on automobile repair and customization, hosted by Kevin Byrd and Willie B. The series is based in Tampa, Florida. Two Guys Garage covers virtually every aspect of vehicle repairing, customizing and restoring. The hosts perform product demonstrations and installations on a wide variety of import and domestic cars and light trucks, and they show viewers the right way to execute modifications with hands-on projects throughout the season.

The hosts also visit well-known shops in the performance and engineering industry, and recognized experts occasionally stop by the Two Guys Garage shop to lend their technical authority to the series.

Ongoing projects are a part of every show and provide the basis for new problems to solve. Along with series project vehicles, friends bring in their special cars to have Kevin and Willie help with a performance or dress-up project that solves a specific problem of high interest to viewers.

The show moved to GAC owned by Scripps. Scripps also owns HGTV, Travel Channel, Food Network, Cook Channel, DIY Network. These how-to networks reach over one million homes across the US.
