= LAPTV =

Latin American media company

- LAP TV Logo
- Industry: Television
- Founded: March 15, 1993
- Defunct: October 2013
- Headquarters: Atlanta, GA, USA
- Number of locations: 4
- Area served: Latin America except Brazil; The Caribbean
- Production output: Cable channels
- Services: advertising
- Revenue: $75 million (2000)
- Number of employees: 60 (2000)
- Parent: The Walt Disney Company Latin America (The Walt Disney Company)
- Website: http://www.laptv.com (Defunct, redirects to Fox International Channels Latin America website)

LAPTV (Latin American Pay Television Service) was a Latin American pay television company founded by many cable providers of the region (MVS Comunicaciones, Grupo Cisneros) and many cinema producers/distributors (such as United International Pictures, distributor of Paramount Pictures and Universal Studios). It runs several film and television series channels, such as Cinecanal and Film Zone, and previously Moviecity.

== History ==
LAPTV was formed as a partnership between Metro-Goldwyn-Mayer, Paramount Pictures, and Fox in Latin America in 1993 with Universal Studios joining later. On May 22, 2012, Fox International Channels acquired MGM's stake in LAP TV. In March 2013, Fox purchased Paramount's position in the company, thus becoming the sole owner of LAP TV, and sign a content agreement with LAP TV. Starting on November 3, 2014, all the Premium channels of the pack were rebranded as "Fox+", dropping the "Movie City" brand definitely, and consolidating the Fox brand in LAPTV with the operations in Fox International Channels. Operations of Cinecanal and Film Zone were unaffected.

== Channels ==
=== Basic-tier channels ===
- Cinecanal (1993–present): Mix of new releases and slightly older films, also shows films previously shown on Moviecity/Fox+ and before any other basic-tier pay-TV channel. Before 2010, it was part of the premium-labelled networks of the company.

=== Defunct Brands ===
- Film Zone (1999-2017): Offered 3 independent films from the Sundance Channel and films previously shown on Moviecity/Fox+ and Cinecanal.
- Moviecity (1997 - November 3, 2014): New releases only
- Cinecanal 2 (1997 - 2007): Mix of new releases and slightly older films
- Cinecanal Classics (2004 - 2009): Classic movies
