= Disney Jr. (Latin America) =

Pay television network in Latin America

- New logo used since August 7, 2024
- Broadcast area: Hispanic America; Caribbean
- Headquarters: Buenos Aires, Argentina; Santiago, Chile; Bogotá, Colombia; Mexico City, Mexico

Programming
- Languages: Spanish; English (via SAP)
- Picture format: 1080i HDTV; (downscaled to 480i/576i for the SDTV feed)

Ownership
- Owner: Disney Media Networks Latin America
- Parent: The Walt Disney Company Latin America
- Sister channels: Disney Channel; Star Channel; Cinecanal; FX; National Geographic

History
- Launched: June 1, 2008; 18 years ago (as Playhouse Disney); April 1, 2011; 15 years ago (as Disney Junior)
- Former names: Playhouse Disney Channel (2008–2011); Disney Junior (2011–2024)

Links
- Website: disneylatino.com/tv

Disney Jr. is a Latin American cable and satellite television channel in Hispanic America. It is the local variant of the American channel of the same name. It is broadcast in two feeds: North Zone and South Zone. It is marketed to preschoolers. Disney Jr. is operated by Disney Media Networks Latin America; part of The Walt Disney Company Latin America.

It was launched on June 1, 2008, as Playhouse Disney Channel and serving as a direct competitor to Discovery Kids. Formerly it only was a programming block in the mornings of Disney Channel Latin America, whose morning block continued as Disney Junior en Disney Channel (only in the North, Central and Pacific feeds) until the elimination of the block in 2019. The programs are very similar to the Disney Jr. channel and Disney Jr. on Disney Channel block in the United States. However, the channel also airs non-original programming.

On November 26, 2010 The Walt Disney Company Latin America announced that the channel would be replaced by Disney Junior sometime in 2011, and the relaunch happened on April 1, 2011, coinciding with the premiere of The Garden of Clarilu.

== History ==
=== As Playhouse Disney (2008–2011) ===
The channel started as a programming block in the mornings of Disney Channel Latin America airing original programming focused on preschoolers. An original production, produced by RGB Entertainment, named "La Casa de Playhouse Disney" (Playhouse Disney's House) aired on the block, with two hosts reading stories and playing games with kids, as well as introducing the series.

On June 1, 2008, Disney Media Networks Latin America launched Playhouse Disney Channel as a 24-hour independent channel, initially only in Argentina and Mexico, eventually reaching more of Latin America.

=== As Disney Junior (2011–present) ===
On November 26, 2010, The Walt Disney Company Latin America announced that Playhouse Disney Channel would be replaced by Disney Junior sometime in 2011. The channel keeps up with 24-hour of programming aimed to preschoolers and received new online services which will allow seeing entire episodes, musical videos and other content in websites. The new Disney Junior also received mobile services.

On January 10, 2022, The Walt Disney Company announced that Disney Junior would end in Brazil on March 31, 2022. In Hispanic America, the channel will continue to operate.

== Feeds ==
Disney Jr. Latin America is divided into two feeds for its different transmissions, each with different schedules and hosts.

List of Available Feeds
Feed Name	Country/Region	Headquarters	Time Zone(s)	Launch Date	Languages
Disney Jr. North	Caribbean	Bogotá, Colombia; Mexico City, Mexico	Mexico – CT (UTC−06:00/UTC−05:00 DST); Colombia – COT (UTC−05:00)	June 1, 2008	Spanish; English (via SAP)
Disney Jr. North	Central America	Bogotá, Colombia; Mexico City, Mexico	Mexico – CT (UTC−06:00/UTC−05:00 DST); Colombia – COT (UTC−05:00)	June 1, 2008	Spanish; English (via SAP)
Disney Jr. North	Colombia	Bogotá, Colombia; Mexico City, Mexico	Mexico – CT (UTC−06:00/UTC−05:00 DST); Colombia – COT (UTC−05:00)	June 1, 2008	Spanish; English (via SAP)
Disney Jr. North	Dominican Republic	Bogotá, Colombia; Mexico City, Mexico	Mexico – CT (UTC−06:00/UTC−05:00 DST); Colombia – COT (UTC−05:00)	June 1, 2008	Spanish; English (via SAP)
Disney Jr. North	Mexico	Bogotá, Colombia; Mexico City, Mexico	Mexico – CT (UTC−06:00/UTC−05:00 DST); Colombia – COT (UTC−05:00)	June 1, 2008	Spanish; English (via SAP)
Disney Jr. North	Venezuela	Bogotá, Colombia; Mexico City, Mexico	Mexico – CT (UTC−06:00/UTC−05:00 DST); Colombia – COT (UTC−05:00)	June 1, 2008	Spanish; English (via SAP)
Disney Jr. South	Argentina	Buenos Aires, Argentina; Santiago, Chile	Argentina – ART (UTC−03:00); Chile – CLT/CLST (UTC−04:00/UTC−03:00 DST)	June 1, 2008	Spanish; English (via SAP)
Disney Jr. South	Bolivia	Buenos Aires, Argentina; Santiago, Chile	Argentina – ART (UTC−03:00); Chile – CLT/CLST (UTC−04:00/UTC−03:00 DST)	June 1, 2008	Spanish; English (via SAP)
Disney Jr. South	Chile	Buenos Aires, Argentina; Santiago, Chile	Argentina – ART (UTC−03:00); Chile – CLT/CLST (UTC−04:00/UTC−03:00 DST)	June 1, 2008	Spanish; English (via SAP)
Disney Jr. South	Ecuador	Buenos Aires, Argentina; Santiago, Chile	Argentina – ART (UTC−03:00); Chile – CLT/CLST (UTC−04:00/UTC−03:00 DST)	June 1, 2008	Spanish; English (via SAP)
Disney Jr. South	Paraguay	Buenos Aires, Argentina; Santiago, Chile	Argentina – ART (UTC−03:00); Chile – CLT/CLST (UTC−04:00/UTC−03:00 DST)	June 1, 2008	Spanish; English (via SAP)
Disney Jr. South	Peru	Buenos Aires, Argentina; Santiago, Chile	Argentina – ART (UTC−03:00); Chile – CLT/CLST (UTC−04:00/UTC−03:00 DST)	June 1, 2008	Spanish; English (via SAP)
Disney Jr. South	Uruguay	Buenos Aires, Argentina; Santiago, Chile	Argentina – ART (UTC−03:00); Chile – CLT/CLST (UTC−04:00/UTC−03:00 DST)	June 1, 2008	Spanish; English (via SAP)

== Website ==
The website was launched on June 1, 2008, along with the channel and replacing the mini-website of the programming block on Disney Channel. There are two feeds, North Zone and South Zone.

Inside the website, each series had its own mini-website with information and downloads about the show. Different games and activities were also available. The users could listen to music from the shows, read stories or view programming.

=== Disney Junior Video ===
Disney Junior Video was a video service where users can see the programming of the channel. It used the same engine and similar design to Disney Channel Play in Disney Channel Latin America.

== Logos ==
2008–2011

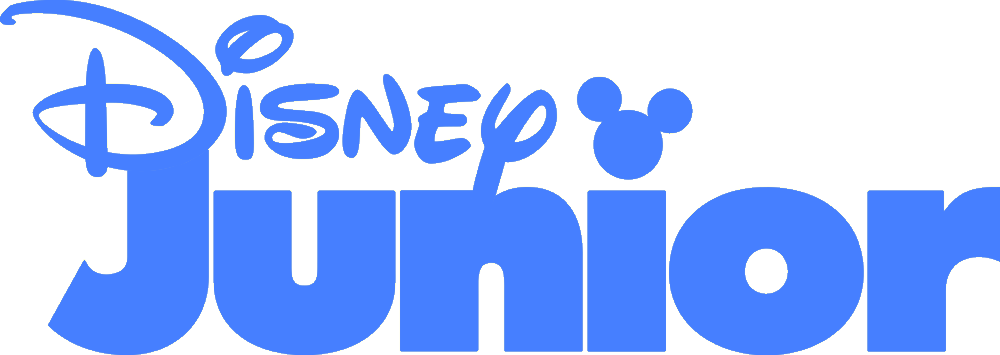
2017–2024

2024–present

== See also ==
- Disney Jr.
- Playhouse Disney
- Disney Channel (Latin America)
- Disney Jr. (Portugal)
