= National Geographic (Latin America) =

Latin American television channel

- Country: Latin America
- Headquarters: Miami, United States

Programming
- Picture format: 1080i HDTV (downscaled to 16:9 480i for the SDTV)

Ownership
- Owner: Disney Media Networks Latin America
- Parent: National Geographic Partners, LLC: National Geographic Society (Walt Disney Direct-to-Consumer & International Disney Latin America)
- Sister channels: Disney Channel; Disney Junior; Star Channel; FX; Cinecanal

History
- Launched: 1 November 2000; 26 years ago
- Closed: March 1, 2025; 20 months ago (only Brazil)
- Former names: National Geographic Channel (2000–2016)

Links
- Website: www.nationalgeographicla.com

National Geographic (formerly National Geographic Channel and abbreviated as NatGeo) is a Latin American specialty channel owned by National Geographic. It features documentary and human interest programming that explores the natural world. The service, like its international counterparts, is based on National Geographic Magazine.

== Programming ==
Programming includes specials and theme weeks such as 'Shark Week'. The programs broadcast revolve around the following topics: wildlife, history, science and technology, people and culture, and travel and adventure.

== History ==
The channel was launched on November 1, 2000 under the ownership of the U.S.-based National Geographic Channel.

On December 2, 2024, The Walt Disney Company announced that National Geographic would end its linear channel in Brazil along with its sister channels (except for its ESPN channels) on February 28, 2025. In Hispanic America, the channel will continue to operate.

== Logos ==
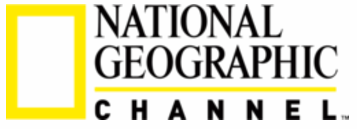
Original logo used from 2001–2002

Previous logo used from 2003–2016
