= Star Premium =

Group of Latin American premium television networks

- Broadcast area: Latin America
- Headquarters: Atlanta, Georgia (programming/playout)

Programming
- Languages: English with subtitles in Spanish and Portuguese
- Picture format: 480p (SDTV); 1080i (HDTV)

Ownership
- Owner: LAPTV (1997–2012); 21st Century Fox (2013–2019; under Fox International Channels Latin America); The Walt Disney Company (2019–2022; under The Walt Disney Company Latin America)

History
- Launched: Latin America: June 1, 1997; 28 years ago Brazil: February 13, 2016; 10 years ago
- Closed: February 1, 2022; 4 years ago
- Former names: Moviecity (1997–2014); Fox+ (2014–2016); Fox+ Premium (2016–2017); Fox Premium (2017–2021)

Star Premium (formerly known as Fox+ and Fox Premium) was a multiplex suite of premium Latin American subscription television channels owned by The Walt Disney Company Latin America. The network competed with HBO Latin America and its programming consisted mostly of non-dubbed movies and series with Spanish and Portuguese subtitles.

The network ceased broadcasting on February 1, 2022, due to Bob Chapek's controversial strategy of closing 100 channels internationally.

== History ==
The network was launched in Latin America, excluding Brazil, on June 1, 1997, by LAPTV, a joint-venture between Universal Pictures, Metro-Goldwyn-Mayer, Fox Entertainment Group and Paramount Pictures. In 2013 LAPTV was integrated into Fox International Channels Latin America and the channel package was renamed the following year as Fox+ and later as Fox Premium. The suite was renamed Star Premium on February 22, 2021, as Disney de-emphasized use of the Fox brand.

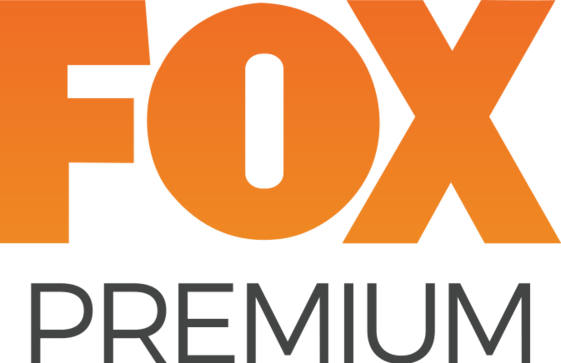
Former logo as Fox Premium from 2018 until 2021

In 2012, the channels were rebranded and aligned under Moviecity brand name.

- MovieCity (founded in 1997), became MovieCity Premieres
- CityMix (1997), became MovieCity Hollywood
- CityStars (2004), became MovieCity Classics
- CityVibe (2007), became MovieCity Action
- CityFamily (2009), became MovieCity Family
- CityMundo (2011), became MovieCity Mundo

The first five channels also were launched in high definition in 2012, along with video on demand and Internet streaming being added, though they lost Universal Pictures films after HBO gained the rights to their films. Fox Latin America purchased the CineCanal and MovieCity networks in 2009. LAPTV itself was integrated into FLA itself in 2013.

In 2014, Fox International Channels Latin America announced the re-branding of the MovieCity multiplex as Fox+, along with the streaming service Fox Play+. Another network, Fox Comedy, was also established.

The network was launched in Brazil in February 2016 with 2 channels, along with rebrand of MovieCity as Fox 1 and MovieCity Action as Fox Action. The network became simply Fox Premium on March 11, 2017, with Fox 1 again rebranded to Fox Premium Series.

On November 27, 2020, Disney announced that they would rebrand the Fox branded channels in Latin America to Star on February 22, 2021, as it pushed the Star branding from regional Asian use to worldwide outside of North America. Though the rebranding of these networks would be short-lived, it saved Disney brand licensing fees to Fox Corporation for the continued use of the Fox trademark on active television networks.

With the controversial strategy made by Bob Chapek of the closure of 100 networks worldwide, including Star Premium in Latin America, the channels were discontinued on January 31, 2022.

== Channels ==
=== Spanish-speaking Latin America & Caribbean ===
Image	Name	Notes
	Star Hits	First-run movies and Hollywood films
	Star Series	First-run series and new episodes for acclaimed series
	Star Action	Action films and series, ring sports pay-per-view events, and select Formula 1 races
	Star Cinema	Independent movies and Latin American and European films
	Star Classics	Classic movies
	Star Comedy	Comedy movies and series
	Star Fun	Movies and Series rated G, PG and PG-13

=== Brazil ===
- Star Hits (formerly Fox 1 & Fox Premium 1)
- Star Hits 2 (formerly Fox Action & Fox Premium 2)
