= FX (Latin American TV channel) =

Latin American pay television channel

FX (Latin America)
- FX Logo
- Broadcast area: Latin America

Programming
- Languages: Spanish, English

Ownership
- Owner: Disney Media Networks Latin America
- Parent: The Walt Disney Company Latin America (Disney International Operations) (The Walt Disney Company)
- Sister channels: Cinecanal; Disney Channel; Disney Jr.; National Geographic; Star Channel

History
- Launched: 1 May 2005; 21 years ago
- Closed: 1 March 2025; 20 months ago (only Brazil)

FX is a Latin American pay television channel. It is intended as a counterpart to Fox Life (which became Star Life, now defunct), the first being produced for the Young and Adult audience, while the latter is almost entirely programmed for the female viewers. It was launched on May 1, 2005.

== History ==
The channel started broadcasting on May 1, 2005, under the slogan Lo que el hombre ve (what men watch). At launch it was received by 5 million households and had secured agreements with Sky Brasil and cable television associations in Mexico (PCTV) and Colombia. Between 2006 and 2007 it had an original reality show called La Chica FX.

In July 2007, Fox's adult animation block, No molestar!, in Spanish or Não perturbe!, in Portuguese (literal: "Do not disturb!"), was extended to FX, featuring series as Family Guy, American Dad!, God, the Devil and Bob and The Wrong Coast, all previously seen on the Fox block. But the block was removed from the channel in 2011.

In January 2012, FX launched its own HD feed throughout Latin America.

On November 27, 2020, Disney announced that it would rename the Fox channels in Latin America to Star on 22 February 2021. This change would not affect FX, National Geographic, FXM, Cinecanal or Fox Sports Channels.

Between April and May 2021, after 15 years, Fox's adult animation shows, such as Family Guy, American Dad!, Bob's Burgers and Bless the Harts, were moved from the channel to the STAR+ streaming service. Ever since, only films, series and other programs were broadcast.

On December 2, 2024, The Walt Disney Company announced that FX would end its programming in Brazil along with its sister channels (except for its ESPN channels) on February 28, 2025. In Hispanic America, the channel will continue to operate.

== Programming ==
Primetime

- American Horror Story
- The Americans
- Baywatch
- Better Off Ted
- Blind Date
- Blind Justice
- Bones (aired on Star Channel)
- The Bridge
- Brotherhood
- Burn Notice
- The Chicago Code
- Crusoe
- Dexter
- Dollhouse
- The Good Guys
- Homeland
- It's Always Sunny in Philadelphia
- The League
- Life on Mars US
- The Loop
- Magic City
- Masters of Horror
- Nip/Tuck
- The Office (dubbed, i.Sat broadcast the subtitled version)
- Prison Break
- ReGenesis
- Reno 911!
- The Riches
- Saved
- Sons of Anarchy
- Spartacus: Blood and Sand
  - Spartacus: Gods of the Arena
- Stargate Atlantis
- Stargate SG-1
- The Strain
- Terriers
- Tyrant
- The Unit
- The Walking Dead
- Wilfred
- The Man Show
- Penn & Teller
- Playboyz
- Private Stars
- Sin Cities
- Costa Del Sex
- Emma's A-Z of American Sex
- Family Business
- G String Divas
- I Dream of Jodie
- Ben and Kate
- Car Crazy
- Car Cruzin
- Crisis
- Dads
- Gadgets, Gadgets, Gadgets
- Gang Related
- Graceland
- How To Blow A Billion
- Innov8
- Innovaciones Tecnologicas
- Man's Work
- My Name Is Earl
- Transit
- Ultimate Gambler
- The X-Files

Sports / Sports Entertainment

- European Poker Tour
- High Stakes Poker
- NXT
- The Ultimate Fighter
- Ultimate Poker Babes
- Ultimate Poker Challenge

Animation

- Allen Gregory
- American Dad!
- Bless the Harts
- Bob's Burgers
- Brickleberry
- City Hunters
- The Cleveland Show
- Family Guy
- Free for All
- God, the Devil and Bob
- The Wrong Coast
- Kung Faux
- King of the Hill
- Napoleon Dynamite
- Neighbors from Hell
- The Simpsons
- Sit Down, Shut Up
- Out There

Speed Channel Block

- Pinks
- Truck Universe
- Two Guys Garage

Original Programming

- La chica FX
- La chica FX 2
