= The Walt Disney Company Latin America =

Latin American division of The Walt Disney Company

- Trade name: Disney Latino
- Type: Subsidiary
- Industry: Media conglomerate
- Founded: 1943; 83 years ago
- Founder: Walt Disney
- Headquarters: Pilar, Argentina
- Number of locations: Pilar, Argentina; São Paulo, Brazil; Bogotá, Colombia; Mexico City, Mexico; Miami, United States
- Area served: Latin America; United States
- Key people: Martin Iraola (president for Latin American region): Isabella Garcia (vice president); Cristina Giosa (Chief Marketing Officer); Renato D'Angelo (president for Brazilian region)
- Products: Television; Streaming services; Radio
- Total assets: Patagonik Film Group (30%); Buena Vista International; Disney Channel; Disney Jr.; ESPN (Latin America); Star Channel; FX; Cinecanal; National Geographic; BabyTV; ESPN (Brazil); Radio Disney Latin America; Radio Disney (Argentina); Rádio Disney Brasil (29%); Disney+; ESPN App
- Parent: Disney Entertainment
- Subsidiaries: The Walt Disney Company Argentina
- Website: disneylatino.com (Hispanic American region) disney.com.br (Brazilian region)

The Walt Disney Company Latin America is one of the Walt Disney Company's international divisions. It is responsible for the Disney brand and its businesses throughout the region. It has offices in Argentina, Brazil, Colombia, Mexico and Miami.

The company owns and operates the Latin American versions of Disney Channel, Disney Jr., ESPN and Radio Disney. The Walt Disney Company Latin America also produces content as well with other media companies.

On 2 December 2024, Disney announced the closure of all its channels in Brazil (except for its ESPN channels) on 28 February 2025. In Hispanic America, the channels will continue to operate.

== Assets ==
=== Home video and Television production companies ===
- Patagonik Film Group (30%)
- Buena Vista International (formerly Star Distribution)

=== TV channels in Latin America ===
- Disney Channel
- Disney Jr.
- Star Channel
- Cinecanal
- National Geographic
- ESPN
  - Latin America: ESPN, ESPN 2, ESPN 3, ESPN 4, ESPN 5 (except Argentina and Mexico), ESPN 6 (except Argentina and Mexico) and ESPN 7 (except Mexico, Argentina and Central America)
  - Argentina and Chile: ESPN Premium
  - Caribbean: ESPN and ESPN 2
- FX
- BabyTV (operated from Europe)
- TV Chile (only distribution)
- Canal 24 Horas (only distribution)

=== TV channels in Brazil ===
- ESPN
  - ESPN 2, ESPN 3, ESPN 4, ESPN 5 and ESPN 6

=== Streaming services ===
- Disney+
- ESPN App

=== Radio networks and stations ===
- Radio Disney Latin America
  - LRL301 Radio Disney (4.75%; shares owned by The Walt Disney Company Argentina).
  - Rádio Disney Brasil (29%)

== Disney Media Networks Latin America ==
Disney Media Networks Latin America is the Hispanic American division of the Walt Disney Company Latin America that operates, distributes and markets the company's channels in Hispanic America. Previously, sales for Disney Channel and Jetix were handled by HBO Latin America Group.

== Former assets ==
- Brazilian feeds of Disney Channel, Star Channel, National Geographic, Cinecanal, BabyTV and FX – Closed on March 1, 2025
- Disney Junior Brazil (formerly Playhouse Disney) – Closed on April 1, 2022
- Disney XD Latin America (formerly Fox Kids; later Jetix) – Closed on April 1, 2022
- Disney XD Brazil (formerly Fox Kids; later Jetix) – Closed on April 1, 2022
- Fox Sports Latin America
  - Fox Sports, Fox Sports 1 (Chile), Fox Sports 2 (Central and South America), Fox Sports 3 and Fox Sports Premium (Argentina) – Channels rebranded as ESPN on December 1, 2021, May 1, 2022, and February 15, 2024, and closed on June 14, 2023, for Fox Sports 2 in Central America
- Fox Sports Argentina – sold to Mediapro in 2022
- Fox Sports Mexico – sold to Grupo Multimedia Lauman in 2021
- Fox Sports Brazil
  - Fox Sports and Fox Sports 2 – Channels rebranded as ESPN on January 17, 2022, and February 15, 2024
- FXM Latin America – Closed on April 1, 2022
- Nat Geo Wild – Closed on April 1, 2022
- Nat Geo Kids – Closed on April 1, 2022
- TIS Productions – sold to Paramount Networks Americas owned by Paramount Global in 2021
- 20th Century Fox Home Entertainment Latin America
- Buena Vista Original Productions – Renamed to Star Original Productions on May 19, 2021
- Walt Disney Studios Home Entertainment Latin America – Became dormant in late 2023 as Disney discontinued physical home media distribution in Latin American markets
- Star+ – Closed on July 24, 2024
- Star Distribution – Retired and replaced by Buena Vista International in early 2026
- Star Original Productions (formerly Buena Vista Original Productions (2019–2021) and Fox Producciones Originales (2015–2021)) – Absorbed to the second incarnation of Buena Vista International in 2026
- Star Life Latin America (formerly Fox Life) – Closed on April 1, 2022
- Star Life Brazil (formerly Fox Life) – Closed and replaced by Cinecanal on April 1, 2022
- Star Premium Latin America (formerly Moviecity, Fox+ and Fox Premium) – Closed on January 31, 2022
  - Star Action, Star Cinema, Star Classics, Star Comedy, Star Fun, Star Hits and Star Series
- Star Premium Brazil (formerly Fox Premium) – Closed on January 31, 2022
  - Star Hits 1 and Star Hits 2
- Rede Telecine (with Globosat, Universal Pictures, Paramount Pictures and MGM. Only distribution)
  - Megapix
  - Telecine Action, Telecine Cult, Telecine Fun, Telecine Pipoca, Telecine Premium, Telecine Touch
