= Fox (international) =

Group of TV channels

- Logo used from 2019 until 2024
- Product type: Television networks
- Produced by: Rupert Murdoch
- Country: United States
- Introduced: 14 August 1993; 33 years ago
- Discontinued: 11 March 2024; 2 years ago
- Markets: Asia; Baltics and CIS; Belgium; Bulgaria; Greece; Germany, Austria and Switzerland; Hong Kong; Hungary; Italy; Japan; Korea; Latin America; Middle East; Netherlands; Norway; Philippines; Poland; Portugal; Serbia; Spain; Southeast Asia; South Africa; Sweden; Finland; Turkey; Taiwan; Thailand; UK and Ireland
- Previous owners: News Corporation; 21st Century Fox; The Walt Disney Company

Fox is a defunct series of international television channels which used to be operated by Fox Networks Group, a division of 21st Century Fox. The network was affiliated with Fox Broadcasting Company from its inception until Disney's acquisition of 21st Century Fox in 2019.

In the following years, several Fox networks worldwide were renamed, with most adopting the formerly Asian-centric brand Star based upon the Star hub available on Disney+ with most channels transitioned to being branded as Star Channel, while networks in the Baltic states, CIS, Greece and Poland instead transitioned to being branded as FX, and certain other networks were discontinued outright due to refocus for Disney+.

== Fox around the world ==
Channel	Country or region	Formerly	Launch year	Replacement / Rebrand	Shutdown year
Fox Channel	Latin America		August 14, 1993	Star Channel	February 22, 2021
Fox Channel	Brazil		September 27, 1994	Star Channel	February 22, 2021
Fox (Japan)	Japan		February 1998	Dlife (second era)	March 1, 2024
Fox (Spain)	Spain		June 1, 2001	Star Channel	March 11, 2024
Fox (Portugal)	Portugal		March 1, 2003	Star Channel	February 7, 2024
Fox (Italy)	Italy		July 31, 2003	discontinued	July 1, 2022
Fox (Korea)	South Korea		April 1, 2006	CH.NOW	December 31, 2020
Fox (Turkey)	Turkey	TGRT	February 24, 2007	Now	February 12, 2024
Fox (Germany)	Germany	Premiere Serie (only on Premiere)	May 19, 2008	discontinued	October 1, 2021
Fox (Asia)	Southeast Asia and Hong Kong		December 2009	discontinued	October 1, 2021
Fox (Africa)	Africa	Fox Entertainment	May 1, 2010	discontinued	October 1, 2021
Fox (Poland)	Poland		November 6, 2010	FX	November 7, 2023
Fox (Middle East)	Middle East	Fox Series	March 1, 2011	Star Series	March 1, 2024
Fox (Finland)	Finland	SuomiTV	April 15, 2012	Star Channel	January 6, 2023
Fox (Taiwan)	Taiwan	Channel V Taiwan	September 1, 2012	Star World (second era)	January 1, 2022
Fox (Greece)	Greece	FX (first era)	October 1, 2012	FX (second era)	March 15, 2023
Fox (Russia)	Russia, Belarus, Baltics and CIS	Fox Crime	October 1, 2012 (Russia, Baltics and CIS)	Kineko (Russia and Belarus)	October 1, 2022 (Russia and Belarus)
Fox (Russia)	Russia, Belarus, Baltics and CIS	Fox Crime	October 1, 2012 (Russia, Baltics and CIS)	FX (Baltics and CIS)	January 24, 2024 (Baltics and CIS)
Fox (Bulgaria)	Bulgaria		October 15, 2012	Star Channel	October 1, 2023
Fox (Serbian)	Balkans		October 15, 2012	Star Channel	October 1, 2023
Fox (UK and Ireland)	UK and Ireland	FX	January 11, 2013	discontinued	July 1, 2021
Fox (Norway)	Norway	Fox Crime	July 1, 2013	discontinued	March 31, 2021
Fox (Netherlands)	Netherlands		August 19, 2013	Star Channel	November 1, 2023
Fox (Hungary)	Hungary		February 4, 2014	discontinued	April 30, 2018
Fox (Sweden)	Sweden		September 22, 2014	discontinued	January 1, 2021
Fox (Belgium)	Belgium		October 1, 2015	Star Channel	November 1, 2023

== See also ==
- Star Channel (international)
- Star Life (international)
- FX (international)
- FX Life
- Fox Sports International
- Fox Life
- Fox Crime
- Fox Comedy
- Fox Movies
- Fox Networks Group
