= FX =

FX, F-X, F/X, Fx, or fx may refer to:

== Arts, entertainment, and media ==
=== Effects ===
FX, as in:

- Special effect
- Sound effect
- Effects unit

=== Music ===
==== Groups and labels ====
- f(x) (group), South Korean girl group
- Negative FX, a hardcore rock band

==== Other uses in music ====
- "FX", a song on Vol. 4 (Black Sabbath album)

=== Television channels ===
- FX (TV channel) along with its international networks, include:
  - FX (Asia), defunct
  - FX (Canada)
  - FX (Greece)
  - FX (India), defunct
  - FX (Italian TV channel), defunct
  - FX (Latin America)
  - FX (Portugal), known as Fox Comedy since 2015
  - FX (Australia), defunct
  - Fox (UK and Ireland), British television channel formerly known as FX
  - FX (Polish TV channel)

=== Other uses in arts, entertainment, and media ===
- FX (comics), a comic book series
- FX (magazine), a UK trade magazine
- F/X, a 1986 American action-thriller film
- F/X2, a 1991 action-thriller sequel to the 1986 film
- F/X: The Series, a television program based on the 1986 film

== Brands and enterprises ==
- FX Airguns, Swedish airgun manufacturer
- FX format, Nikon's nomenclature for the full-frame digital SLR camera
- FedEx Express, IATA airline code FX
- Fuji Xerox, or FX, a Japanese document management company

== Computing ==
- AMD FX, AMD's processor
- Athlon 64 FX processor
- Firefox, a web browser
- GeForce FX graphics processing unit
- JavaFX, a software platform
- Super FX, a SNES coprocessor

== Economics and finance ==
- Foreign exchange (disambiguation)
- Foreign exchange market, forex or FX

== Healthcare and science ==
- Fx, medical shorthand for a bone fracture
- Factor X, a protein involved in coagulation

== Vehicles ==
- Holden 48-215, unofficially FX, Australian car
- Infiniti FX, an SUV
- Tecma FX, a French hang glider
- Toyota Kijang or Tamaraw FX, an SUV
  - FX, the former term for UV Express in the Philippines

=== Aviation ===
- Fighter Experimental:
  - FX (Fighter Experimental), specifications for two US Naval fighter projects
  - F-X (Fighter, Unknown designation number), ultimately USAF F-15 Eagle and General Dynamics F-16
  - KFX/IFX, Indonesian fighter program
  - KF-X, South Korean fighter program

== Other uses ==
- f(x), functions in mathematics
- F. X. Hadi Rudyatmo (born 1960), Indonesian politician and former Mayor of Surakarta
- Floor exercise, gymnastics event
- Foreign exchange service (telecommunications), a telephone connection to a distant exchange
- Frequent Express, a transit service provided by TriMet in Portland and Gresham, Oregon
