= FX (international) =

Television channel brand

- Logo used in Canada and Latin America since 2013

- Logo used in Greece, Poland, Baltics and CIS since 2023 and 2024
- Product type: Television networks
- Current owner: The Walt Disney Company
- Produced by: Rupert Murdoch
- Country: United States
- Introduced: January 12, 2004
- Markets: Asia; Australia; Baltics and CIS; Canada; Greece; India; Italy; Latin America; Middle East; Poland; Portugal; South Africa; UK and Ireland; Turkey
- Previous owners: News Corporation; 21st Century Fox

FX is an international television channel brand stemming from the eponymous American standard or premium cable television channel and is owned by FX Networks, a subsidiary of the Disney Entertainment business segment of the Walt Disney Company.

== Current channels ==
=== Baltics and CIS ===
- FX (previously Fox Crime and Fox) is a Russian-language television channel that launched on March 5, 2008. The channel was closed on October 1, 2022, for Russia & Belarus, and was replaced by Kineko in Russia, but it's still active in the CIS & Baltic regions. Cable operators in Estonia have localized version of the channel with advertising. The channel has rebranded as FX on 24 January 2024.

=== Canada ===
On August 6, 2011, Rogers Sports & Media entered into a licensing agreement with FX Networks to launch FX Canada as a pay television channel. The network, which launched on November 1, 2011, features a mix of FX original series; acquired American movies and series; and original Canadian programming and sporting events (as required by the Canadian content rules imposed by the Canadian Radio-television and Telecommunications Commission). FX Canada's broadcast license requires that 15% of its programming consist of Canadian content in its first year, 20% in its second year and 25% by its third year.

On May 18, 2018, Remstar Media Group entered into a separate licensing agreement to carry a French language FX-branded programming block on the channel Max.

- FX

=== Greece ===
- FX (formerly as Fox) is a Greek channel launched on November 30, 2009. On October 1, 2012, the channel was replaced by Fox. On March 15, 2023, Fox was reverted its name into and replaced again by FX, along with Fox Life becoming FX Life.

=== Latin America ===
- FX Networks Latin America includes FX.

=== Poland ===
- On June 29, 2023, it was announced that the Polish locales of Fox and Fox Comedy would be replaced on November 7, 2023, with Polish locales of FX and FX Comedy.

=== Turkey ===
- FX was launched in Turkey on April 14, 2008, on the D-Smart digital platform. It is also available on the Türksat Kablo (aka KabloTV), Turkcell TV+, S Sport+ and Tivibu digital platforms.

== Other FX-branded channels ==
=== Baltics and CIS ===
- FX Life

=== Canada ===
- FXX

=== Greece ===
- FX Life

=== Poland ===
- FX Comedy

== Former channels ==
=== Asia ===
In 2008, Fox Networks Group Asia and Star TV (through a distribution agreement) partnered to launch FX Asia. The channel is divided into four services: an international channel distributed throughout much of the continent and three national channels serving South Korea, Philippines and Japan. The channel was shut down on October 1, 2021, with most of its content shifting to the Hulu hub on Disney+.

- FX Asia
- FX Philippines

=== Australia ===
- FX was an Australian channel launched on February 26, 2012. On February 28, 2018, FX ceased broadcasting on Foxtel, and all of its programs moved to Fox Showcase.

=== India ===
- FX was an Indian channel operated from 2010 to 2017.

=== Italy ===
- FX was an Italian channel launched on May 22, 2006. Due to the lowest ratings, the channel was closed on July 1, 2011.

=== Latin America ===
- FX Networks Latin America included FXM, which was shut down on April 1, 2022.

=== Brazil ===
- FX was a Brazilian channel launched on May 1, 2005. The channel was closed on March 1, 2025 due to high operational costs in the respective country, declining pay-TV ratings in Brazil and the Brazilian pay-TV crisis.

=== Middle East ===
- FX was launched in the Middle East as a free-to-air channel along with the rest of the Fox-branded channels (which include National Geographic, Nat Geo Wild, STAR Movies, Fox Movies, Fox Rewayat, Fox Family Movies, Fox Action Movies, STAR World, FOX, FX, Fox Life, Fox Crime, Channel V International and Baby TV), the channels later became encrypted instead of free, as a part of beIN network. The channel closed on December 1, 2022, along with Fox Family Movies and Fox Crime.

=== Portugal ===
- FX was a Portuguese channel launched in 2005. In November 2015, the channel was rebranded as Fox Comedy.

=== South Africa ===
- FX was a South African pay-TV satellite channel, part of the StarSat offering on May 1, 2010. It was shut down on October 3, 2016, along with Fox Crime, which closed down on September 30, 2016, to be replaced by Fox Life

=== UK and Ireland ===
- FX was a British and Irish channel launched on January 12, 2004. In 2013 the channel was rebranded as Fox. It later closed down on July 1, 2021, with most of its content moving to the Star content hub on Disney+.

== FX around the world ==
Market	Formerly	Launch year	Replacement / rebrand	Shutdown year
Latin America	-	May 1, 2005	-	-
Brazil	-	May 1, 2005	discontinued	March 1, 2025
Portugal	-	September 26, 2007	Fox Comedy	November 18, 2015
Italy	-	May 21, 2006	discontinued	July 1, 2011
Japan	-	November 3, 2008	WakuWaku	March 1, 2021
South Korea	-	November 3, 2008	MX	December 31, 2020
Turkey	-	April 14, 2008	-	-
Southeast Asia and Hong Kong	-	November 3, 2008	discontinued	July 5, 2020 (Brunei); October 1, 2020 (Indonesia); September 1, 2021 (Hong Kong); October 1, 2021 (rest of the market)
Africa	-	May 1, 2010	Fox Life	October 1, 2016
Poland	Fox	November 7, 2023	-	-
Middle East	-	November 3, 2008	discontinued	December 1, 2022
Greece	Fox	March 15, 2023	-	-
Baltics and CIS	Fox	January 24, 2024 (Baltics and CIS)	-	-
United Kingsdom and Ireland	FX289	April 21, 2005	Fox	January 11, 2013
Australia	-	February 26, 2012	discontinued	March 1, 2018
Canada	-	October 31, 2011	-	-
India	Star Dubai	February 1, 2007	Star Sports First	June 15, 2017

== See also ==
- Star Channel (international)
- FX (TV channel)
- FX Life
- Fox (international)
- Fox Crime
- Fox Comedy
- Fox Life
- Fox Movies
- Fox Sports International
- Fox Networks Group
- Foxtel
