= Star Channel =

Star Channel may refer to:

- Star Channel, the original name (1973–1979) of The Movie Channel, an American premium cable and satellite television network
- Star Channel (Greece), a Greek television channel
- Star Channel (later BS10 Star Channel) the former name of Japanese premium television channel brand BS10 Premium
- Star Channel: a television channel brand owned by The Walt Disney Company as a replacement of the following Fox channels since 2023:
  - Star Channel (Bulgarian TV channel)
  - Star Channel (Canada)
  - Star Channel (Dutch TV channel)
  - Star Channel (Finnish TV channel), formerly known as SuomiTV and Fox
  - Star Channel (Flemish TV channel)
  - Star Channel (Latin America), formerly known as Fox and Fox Channel
  - Star Channel (Portuguese TV channel)
  - Star Channel (Serbian TV channel)
  - Star Channel (Spanish TV channel)

== See also ==
- Star TV (disambiguation)
