= Star Channel (international) =

International television channel brand owned by Disney

- Logo used since 2023
- Product type: Television networks
- Current owner: The Walt Disney Company
- Country: United States
- Introduced: February 22, 2021
- Markets: Balkans; Belgium; Bulgaria; Finland; Latin America; Netherlands; Portugal; Spain

Star Channel is an international television channel brand owned by the Disney Entertainment business segment of the Walt Disney Company. Originally launched in Latin America on February 22, 2021, it expanded worldwide as a replacement for the international Fox channels inherited from the Fox Networks Group division of 21st Century Fox that Disney acquired on March 20, 2019.

As of 2023, apart from the Fox channel rebrands, other former Fox channels in the Baltic states, CIS, Ukraine, Greece, and Poland instead transitioned to being branded as FX. Some worldwide Fox channels, especially those in Africa, UK & Ireland, Germany, Norway, and Southeast Asia, were wound down and entirely discontinued in favor of the launch of Disney+ in their countries/regions.

== Current channels ==
=== Balkans ===
- Star Channel is a Serbian television channel that launched on October 15, 2012 as Fox. The channel was rebranded to Star Channel on October 1, 2023.

=== Belgium (only in Flanders) ===
- Star Channel is a Flemish television channel that launched on October 1, 2015 as Fox. On November 1, 2023, Fox was rebranded to Star Channel.

=== Bulgaria ===
- Star Channel is a Bulgarian channel that launched on October 15, 2012 as Fox. On June 7, 2023, it was announced that all Fox channels in Bulgaria (including Fox Life and Fox Crime) were rebranded as Star Channel as of October 1, 2023.

=== Finland ===
- Star Channel is a Finnish channel that launched on December 18, 2009 as SuomiTV. The channel was relaunched as Fox on April 16, 2012, then rebranded to Star Channel on January 6, 2023.

=== Latin America ===
- Star Channel is a Latin American channel that launched on August 14, 1993 as Fox. The channel was rebranded as Fox Channel in November 2018, then was relaunched as Star Channel on February 22, 2021.

=== Netherlands ===
- Star Channel is a Dutch channel owned by Eredivisie Media & Marketing, which is owned 51% by The Walt Disney Company, launched on August 19, 2013 as Fox. On November 1, 2023, Fox was rebranded to Star Channel.

=== Portugal ===
- Star Channel is a Portuguese channel that launched on March 1, 2003 as Fox. On February 7, 2024, Fox was rebranded to Star Channel.

=== Spain ===
- Star Channel is a Spanish channel that launched on June 1, 2001 as Fox. On March 11, 2024, Fox was rebranded to Star Channel.

== Other Star-branded channels ==
=== Balkans ===
- Star Crime
- Star Life
- Star Movies

=== Bulgaria ===
- Star Crime
- Star Life

=== Middle East and North Africa ===
- Star Channels
  - Star Action
  - Star Movies
  - Star World

=== Portugal ===
- Star Comedy
- Star Crime
- Star Life
- Star Movies
- Star Mundo

== Former channels ==
=== Middle East and North Africa ===
- Star Channels
  - Star Life
  - Star Films
  - Star Series

=== Latin America ===
- Star Life
- Star Premium
  - Star Hits
  - Star Series
  - Star Action
  - Star Comedy
  - Star Fun
  - Star Classics
  - Star Cinema

=== Brazil ===
- Star Channel
- Star Life
- Star Premium
  - Star Hits
  - Star Hits 2

== See also ==
- Fox (international)
- Fox Comedy
- Fox Movies (TV channel)
- FX (international)
- FX Life
- Star Life (international)
