= Disney Jr. (Poland) =

Television channel in Poland

- Country: United Kingdom
- Broadcast area: Poland
- Headquarters: 3 Queen Caroline Street, Hammersmith, London, United Kingdom W6 9PE

Programming
- Language: Polish
- Picture format: SDTV 576i

Ownership
- Owner: The Walt Disney Company Limited; Disney Kids & Family (Disney International Operations)
- Sister channels: List: BabyTV; Disney Channel; Disney XD; FX; FX Comedy; National Geographic; Nat Geo People; Nat Geo Wild

History
- Launched: January 2003; 23 years ago (as Fox Kids Play); 1 January 2005; 21 years ago (as Jetix Play); 3 December 2006; 19 years ago (Playhouse Disney on Disney Channel); 1 September 2010; 16 years ago (Playhouse Disney Channel; replacing Jetix Play); 1 June 2011; 15 years ago (rebranded as Disney Junior)
- Former names: Fox Kids Play (2003-2005); Jetix Play (2005-2010); Playhouse Disney (2010-2011)

Links
- Website: tv.disney.pl/programy/disney-junior

Disney Jr. is a Polish preschool channel owned and operated by The Walt Disney Company Limited in London, England. Initially part of the pan-CEMA feed. It was originally launched as Fox Kids Play in January 2003, it was later rebranded as Jetix Play on 1 January 2005, and Playhouse Disney on 1 September 2010, On 1 June 2011, the channel was later rebranded as Disney Junior.

== See also ==
- Disney Jr.
- Disney Channel (Poland)
- Disney XD (Poland)
- Jetix Play
