= Disney Channel (Poland) =

British-managed Polish children's television channel

- Logo used since 1 September 2022
- Country: United Kingdom
- Broadcast area: Poland
- Headquarters: 3 Queen Caroline Street, Hammersmith, London W6 9PE, United Kingdom

Programming
- Languages: Polish (dubbing/subtitles); English
- Picture format: HDTV 1080i; SDTV 16:9, 576i (downscaled)

Ownership
- Owner: The Walt Disney Company Limited; Disney Branded Television (Disney Entertainment)
- Sister channels: List: BabyTV; Disney Jr.; Disney XD; FX; FX Comedy; National Geographic; Nat Geo Wild; Nat Geo People

History
- Launched: 5 January 1991; 35 years ago (as programming block on TVP1); 2 December 2006; 19 years ago (Part of Disney Channel EMEA); 1 August 2010; 16 years ago (Localized)

Links
- Website: tv.disney.pl

Disney Channel is a British-managed Polish children's television channel, owned and operated by The Walt Disney Company and a localized version of the U.S. television channel of the same name.

It was launched on 2 December 2006, on Canal+ Premium, Polsat Box, Orange TV and some local cable providers. Within the launch, Disney Channel marked the 2nd most popular in Poland, next to MiniMini+.

It previously broadcast 16 hours a day, from 6:00am to 10:00 pm (UTC+01:00), and has aired 24 hours a day since 9 May 2010. It became a non-commercial channel since 2 December 2010, separating the EMEA feed. It has won three times in Telekamery's Tele Tydzień in the "Children's Channel" category.

Disney Channel programs are also available on Disney+ since 14 June 2022.

== History ==
=== Pre-launch ===
Before the channel's launch, Disney Co. Ltd. made a block-time agreement to the television station TVP1, to air in their programming block "Walt Disney Przedstawia" (transl. Walt Disney Presents), which began on 5 January 1991, airing twice a week, especially on Saturdays.

For many years, the programming block changed its schedule and time. Its first schedule start time was at 2:30 pm until August 1994, then was scheduled earlier from 1:00 to 1:30 pm from September 1994. At 12:10 pm from March 1998, at 10:20 am from September 1998, at 10:00 am from July 1999, and at 9:30 to 9:35 am in September 1999.

It also aired on Sundays during "Wieczorynka" (transl. Evenings), until it ended on 1 January 2005.

=== Post-launch ===
The Disney Channel began on 2 December 2006 at 5:00pm (UTC+01:00), which shares the promo feeds from the Scandinavia and Middle Eastern version, and its first program to air was the 2004 animated film The Incredibles. Ratings went up during the launch, and had an estimated 315,000 views.

On 23 July 2010, Disney Co. Ltd. released Disney na Żądanie (transl.: Disney On Demand), a video on demand service which was exclusive to UPC Digital subscribers in the country.

On 1 August 2010, Disney Channel was separated from Disney Channel EMEA.

On 1 October 2013, Disney Channel Poland launched in widescreen.

On 1 October 2015, Disney Channel launched its HD channel.

On 23 April 2022, Disney Channel began broadcasting with a Polish sign language (PJM) in the series Miraculous: Tales of Ladybug & Cat Noir on weekends, designed for viewers who are deaf or have hearing problems, it features Alicja Szurkiewicz from Fundacji Kultury bez Barier (lit. 'Foundation of Culture Without Barriers') as the sign language translator.

== Related services ==
=== Disney Jr. (formerly Playhouse Disney and Disney Junior) ===
A preschool television channel targeted to children ages 2 to 7 years old. First launched in December 2006 as a morning block on Disney Channel as Playhouse Disney. It was later launched as a television channel on 1 September 2010. Both rebranded to Disney Junior on 1 June 2011 at 6:00 am. (UTC+01:00).

=== Disney XD ===
Disney XD targets children and teenagers 6–14 years old. It was launched on 19 September 2009, replacing Jetix. It broadcasts both its own productions, including series thematically addressed to the target group, as well as series and movies from Disney Channel.

As of 1 September 2025, it is the last Disney XD branded channel outside the United States, following the closure of the Canadian channel.

=== Programming blocks on TVP1 (former) ===
Prior to the launch of Disney Channel on 2 December 2006, Disney program were aired in TVP1 began on 5 January 1991. These programming blocks were used until 2014:

- Walt Disney Przedstawia (Walt Disney Presents) (5 January 1991 – 1 January 2005; 2013–2014) - Disney animated series and films.
- Disneya! Cudowny Świat (Disney! Wonderful World) (24 February 2008 – 1 January 2013) - full and short movies, mostly from Pixar.
- Walt Disney w Jedynce (Walt Disney on Jedynka) (12 September 2009-April 2012) - Disney's animated series and sitcoms.

== Logos ==
2006–2011.

2011–2014.

2014–2017.

2017–2022

2022–present

== Sister channels ==
=== Disney XD (Poland) ===
Disney XD is a Polish television channel owned and operated by The Walt Disney Company Limited.

=== Disney Jr. (Poland) ===
Disney Jr. is a Polish preschool channel owned and operated by The Walt Disney Company Limited in London, England. Initially part of the pan-CEMA feed. It was originally launched as Fox Kids Play in January 2003, it was later rebranded as Jetix Play on 1 January 2005, and Playhouse Disney on 1 September 2010, On 1 June 2011, the channel was later rebranded as Disney Junior.
