= Fred Has Problems =

American animated web series

- Genre: Animated sitcom
- Created by: Steve Dildarian
- Written by: Steve Dildarian
- Directed by: Steve Dildarian
- Voices of: Steve Dildarian
- Country of origin: United States
- Original language: English
- No. of seasons: 1
- No. of episodes: 6

Production
- Executive producers: Steve Dildarian; Peter Principato
- Producer: Lilavati L. Cariapat
- Running time: 9–12 minutes
- Production company: Insane Loon Productions

Original release
- Network: YouTube
- Release: July 1, 2026 – present

Fred Has Problems is an American animated web series created by Steve Dildarian, who is best known as creator of The Life & Times of Tim and Ten Year Old Tom.

== Synopsis ==
Optimistic man named Fred who tries to keep up with the times by doing the right thing, yet somehow is besieged by major problems. Whether he attempts to vote, recycle, or help find a lost dog, he ends up looking like the worst person on earth.

== Voice cast ==
=== Main ===
- Steve Dildarian as Fred

== Episodes ==
No.	Title	Original release date
1	"The Garbage Man is Out of Control"	July 1, 2026
2	"Dogs Love Fireworks"	July 1, 2026
3	"Fred's Thumb is Fine"	August 1, 2026
4	"Fred Nailed My Wife in the Pumpkin Patch"	September 1, 2026
5	"The Voting Sticker Fiasco"	October 1, 2026
