= Brian Scolaro =

American comedian and actor (born 1973)

- Born: October 18, 1973 (age 53); Bay Ridge, Brooklyn, New York
- Occupations: Comedian, actor
- Years active: 2001–present
- Website: BrianScolaro.com

Brian Scolaro (born October 18, 1973) is an American comedian, actor, voice-over actor and author. He is most known for his roles of Stuart on FOX's Stacked, as Uncle Bill on HBO's Ten Year Old Tom, as Angelo on AppleTV's "Beat the Reaper", as Brian the lawyer on ABC's A Million Little Things, as Doug on TBS's Sullivan and Son, as Gordon on NBC's Three Sisters, and his stand-up comedy television and streaming appearances.

== Early life ==
Scolaro was born in Bay Ridge, Brooklyn to Anthony and Irene Scolaro. At the State University of New Paltz, New York, Scolaro wrote, produced, and hosted a radio comedy program That Damn Show on WFNP FM for three years. He has stated in the documentary "Waking Up from a Dream" that this comedy program gave birth to his first stand-up act. Along with his friend Brett Bisogno, Scolaro wrote, produced, and starred in the college's television comedy show Earp and Whitney, which was nominated for "Best Comedy Series" by the National Association of College Broadcasters. After college in 1996, he and Brett (along with Darren Zoltowski, Chris Difate, and Jason Greenspan) formed Voodoowop Pictures, which has over a hundred sketches and short films on YouTube.

Brian worked with the mentally handicapped in Brooklyn at the Guild for Exceptional Children for many years, and after a brief stint as a production assistant for HBO Downtown Productions, The Comedy Channel (now Comedy Central), and HBO's "Reel Sex". Scolaro quit his assistant job and turned to stand-up comedy full-time, and did his first stand-up show at Stand Up NY in Manhattan in 1992.

He became a regular at the Comedy Cellar, Comic Strip Live, Dangerfields, Boston Comedy Club, and Gotham Comedy Club. He then appeared at Montreal's Just For Laughs Comedy Festival in 1999 in the "New Faces Show.". His early acting career included three Wendy's commercials and a guest role on Sidney Lumet's "100 Centre St."

== Career ==
In 2001, Scolaro was hired as a regular cast member for the role of love-sick, overly sensitive "Doug" in an NBC pilot Everything but the Girl by Steve Koren (Seinfeld). When the pilot was beaten to the line-up by Scrubs, Lester Lewis (The Office) brought him to the attention of Eileen Heisler and DeAnn Heline (The Middle) and he moved to Hollywood to be a regular cast member on the second season of NBC's Three Sisters as the bartender named Gordon, love interest of A. J. Langer.

Scolaro was cast as one of the four leads in an ABC pilot, "Platonically Incorrect" by Darlene Hunt, Jeff Judah, and Gabe Sachs. It was directed by Tom Shadyac ("Ace Ventura, The Nutty Professor) and shot a second episode. It was not picked up. After a holding deal with CBS in 2004, Scolaro was cast as Stuart Miller for Fox's Stacked which starred Pamela Anderson and Christopher Lloyd. Written by Steve Levitan, Stacked was a pilot that was guaranteed to air six episodes in 2005, and the following year aired a full second season.

During the writers strike of 2007-08, Scolaro did stand-up performances on NBC's Late Night with Conan O'Brien and was invited back to the channel that started his career as an intern, Comedy Central, to headline an episode of Live at Gotham. In 2009, he taped a half-hour special for the network Comedy Central Presents: Brian Scolaro.

From 2008 to 2026, Scolaro has had recurring characters in several series; the sad sack, forgetful Doug on TBS's Sullivan and Son, Brian the negative but competent lawyer on ABC's A Million Little Things, the ridiculous Uncle Bill on "Ten Year Old Tom", the paranormal police man Goblin on Disney's "Wizards of Waverly Place" Angelo on Apple TV's "Beat the Reaper", and played numerous characters on HBO's The Life and Times of Tim and Comedy Central's "Kroll Show".

He has appeared on ABC's "Abbott Elementary", AMC's Mad Men, Showtime's Shameless, Netflix's "Big Mistakes", Starz's "Power: Origins", NBC's "Night Court", ABC Signature's "Godfather of Harlem", TNT's Men of a Certain Age, Showtime's Dexter, ABC's Grey's Anatomy, FOX's Bones, ABC's The Middle, Disney's Girl Meets World, ABC's Castle, NBC's "Law and Order: SVU", Youtube's "Fred Has Problems", and others. His film work includes The Brothers Solomon, "Alto Knights", and "Screamboat". He was also the lead in the 2012 Netflix commercial "Teddy Bear Heist."

He has three comedy albums: "Sneezes, Farts, and Orgasms", "Brian Scolaro: Live at the Comedy Castle", and "Stupid Time: A Sketch Album." He also did stand-up on The Late Late Show with Craig Ferguson, "Comics Unleashed", "Gotham Comedy Live", and Conan, as well as specials for Dry Bar, Helium Comedy Studios, and Amazon Prime TV/Apple TV's special "I Don't Know Who I Am Either." He is also the author of the comedy book "How to Punch a Monkey".

== Television work ==
* Power: Origins Bruce the A******"
- Beat the Reaper Angelo
- Big Mistakes Vinny
- Godfather of Harlem Mickey Campanella
- Law and Order: SVU (Mitch Zniewski)
- Night Court (Arnold)
- Ten Year Old Tom (Uncle Bill; voice)
- Abbott Elementary (Vinny)
- A Million Little Things (Brian)
- Shameless (Baxter)
- Alone Together (Mark)
- I'm Dying Up Here (Buzz)
- Superior Donuts (Scalper)
- Girl Meets World (Mr. Fannucci)
- Castle (Dave Barton)
- Gotham Comedy Live (Himself)
- Conan (himself)
- Truth Be Told (Vincent)
- Bones (Frankie Cesari)
- The Middle (Mickey)
- Crash & Bernstein (Jimmy)
- Growing Up Fisher (Guard)
- Kroll Show (Sergio)
- Go On (Gambler)
- Sullivan & Son (Doug)
- Mad Men (Alex Polito)
- Grey's Anatomy (Mike)
- Late Late Show with Craig Ferguson (himself)
- Harry's Law (Father Damien)
- Men of a Certain Age (City Clerk)
- The Life & Times of Tim (Various Voices)
- Wizards of Waverly Place (Goblin)
- 100 Centre Street (Byron White)
- Everything But The Girl - NBC pilot- Todd
- Platonically Incorrect- ABC Pilot- Bob Snellen
- Three Sisters (Gordon)
- Stacked (Stuart Miller)
- Dexter (Lab Tech)
- One on One (Torian)
- Greetings from Tucson (Larry Janetti)
- Coupling (Paul)
- Late Night with Conan O'Brien himself
- Live at Gotham himself
- Comics Unleashed himself
- Late Friday himself
- Friday Night Videos himself

== Film work ==
- Someone Like You (Audience Warm Up Guy)
- Blowing Smoke (Nick)
- The Brothers Solomon (Medical Equipment Delivery Guy)
- Alto Knights (Paul Castellano)
- Screamboat (Captain Clark)

== Specials ==
- Amazon/Apple TV Special: I Don't Know Who I Am Either himself
- Dry Bar: Trouble himself
- Helium Comedy Studios Special himself
- Comedy Central Presents himself

== Video game work ==
- Grand Theft Auto V (The Local Population)
- Need for Speed: Carbon (Neville)

== Books ==
- How to Punch a Monkey
