= Tara Anderson =

Tara Anderson may refer to:

- Tara Anderson, fictional character in Virgin River (TV series)
- Tara Anderson, fictional character in The Brothers Solomon
