= Fox Kids (disambiguation) =

Fox Kids is a former children's television programming brand.

Fox Kids may also refer to:

- Fox Kids, a programming block on Finnish TV channel Fox
- The European division responsible for international Fox Kids channels, which would later become Jetix Europe, then Disney XD.
- Fox (clothing), a fashion chain featuring a clothing line called Fox Kids
