= National Geographic (Greece) =

National Geographic Channel
- Country: Greece
- Broadcast area: Greece; Cyprus
- Headquarters: Marousi, Athens, Greece

Programming
- Languages: English (with Greek subtitles); Greek (only advertisements)
- Picture format: 720p HDTV (downscaled to 16:9 576i for the SDTV feed)

Ownership
- Owner: The Walt Disney Company Greece (Disney Entertainment)
- Sister channels: FX; FX Life

History
- Launched: 2001
- Former names: National Geographic Channel (2001–2016)

Links
- Website: www.natgeotv.com/gr

National Geographic is a subscription television network, launched in Greece in 2001 by the Fox Networks Group. The channel features documentaries with factual content involving nature, science, culture, and history. Shows can be watched in English with Greek subtitles.

For the first 12 years, the channel was available only to the subscribers of Nova satellite bouquet. During the 2000s, foreign versions used to be available (Dutch & Romanian), but as from September 2011, the channel has been fully relaunched in Greek.

== Programmes on National Geographic ==
- Air Crash Investigation
- Banged Up Abroad
- Big, Bigger, Biggest
- Bite Me
- Britain's Greatest Machines
- Dog Whisperer with Cesar Millan
- Great Migrations
- Hooked
- Hunter Hunted
- Is It Real?
- Lockdown
- Mad Labs
- Megacities in Judge Dredd
- Megafactories
- Megastructures
- Mysteries of the Bible
- Mysteries of the Deep
- Mystery Files
- Naked Science
- Shark Men
- Stonehenge Decoded
- Storm Stories
- Strange Days on Planet Earth
- Taboo
- The Dark Side of Hippos
- The Living Edens
- Thrill Zone
- Thunder Beasts
- Totally Wild
- Wild Russia
- World of Wildlife

== Programmes on Nat Geo Wild ==
- Ultimate Vipers
- Zambezi
- Octopus Volcano
- Caught In The Act
- Animal Impact
- Bandits Of Selous
- Alaskan Killer Shark
- California's Wild Coast
- Golden Seals of Skeleton Coast
- Hummingbirds: Magic In The Air
- Shark Nicole
- Grizzly Cauldron
- Asia's Deadliest Snakes
- Strike Force
- Chimps: Nearly Human
- Dark Side Of Chimps
- Predators in Peril
- Dangerous Encounters With Brady Barr
- Planet Carnivore
- A Man Among Bears
- Dragon Chronicles
- Journey Into Amazonia
- Be The Creature
- Totally Wild
- Caught On Safari: Battle At Kruger
- Croc Ganglands
- Lion Warriors
- Searching For The Snow Leopard
- Leopard Queen
- American Buffalo: Battling Back
- Tiger Queen
- Deep Jungle
- The Living Edens
- Sumatra's Last Tiger
- Croc Ganglands
- Search For The Giant Octopus
- Saved From The Spill
- My Life Is A Zoo
- Underwater Oasis
- Great Apes With Michelle Yeoh
- Zoo Confidential
- The Kill Zone
- Expedition Wild
- Python Hunters
- Evolutions
- Swamp Men
- Wild Nights
- Killer Dragons
- Living With Big Cats
- Into The Abyss
- Africa's Lost Eden
- Predators In Peril
- Clash Of The Crocs
- Eye Of The Leopard
- Relentless Enemies
- Dolphin Army
- Deep Jungle
- How Big Can It Get
- The Real Serengeti
- Return Of The White Lion
- Hunter Hunted
- Shark Island
- Superpride
- Penguin Death Zone
- Ultimate Bear
- Ultimate Cat
- Ultimate Shark
- Ultimate Viper
- Ultimate Hippo
- Ultimate Enemies
- Thunderbeast
- Real Serengeti
- Galapagos
- Kingdom Of The Forest
- Kingdom Of The Meadow
- Morays: The Alien Eels
- The Animal Extractors
- My Dog Ate What?
- Monkey Thieves
- Dog Whisperer
- Great Migrations
- Caught in the Act
- Mystery Gorilla
- Predator Battleground
- Grizzly Cauldron
- Haunt Of The Hippo
- Striker!
- Ultimate Shark
- Night Of The Lion
- The Lion Ranger
- Restless Planet
- Monkey Thieves
- Planet Carnivore
- Inside Nature's Giants
- Monster Crocs
- Bug Brother
- Lions On The Edge
- Built for the Kill
- The Kill Zone
- Dogtown
- Shell Shocked
- Great Migrations
- Lizard Kings
- Animal Impact
- Clan Of The Meerkat
- Sharkville
- Secret Shark Pits
- Wild Nights
- Hidden Worlds
- Expedition Wild
- Lions Behaving Badly
- Lion Warrior
- Wild Russia
- When Crocs Ate Dinosaurs
- Moray Eels
- Lion Army: Battle To Survive
- Wild Animal Evictions
- Mystery Gorillas
- Crocodile King
- The Last Lioness
- Snake Paradise
- Deadly Snakes of Asia
- Tiger Queen
- Amazon Claws
- Wild Dog Diaries
- Saved From the Spill
- Secret Shark Pits
- Squid vs Whale
- Dangerous Encounters With Brad
- World's Weirdest
- My Dog Ate What?
- Catching Giants
- World's Deadlisst Animals
- Triumph Of Life
- Cheetah Blood Brothers
- Cameramen Who Dare
- Shark Night
- Hunter Hunted
- Python Hunters
- World's Wildest Encounters
- Gone Wild
- Monster Fish
- Monster Jellyfish
- Rescue Ink
- Thunderbeast
- Brutal Killers
- Living With Big Cats
- Killer Instincts
- Predator Battleground
- Shaun Ellis
- Wild Asia
- World's Deadliest
- Restless Planet
- Crittercam
- Eternal Enemies
- Big Cat Diary
- Big Cat Odyssey
- Big Animal Hunt with Filip Badrov
- Prehistoric Predators
- Strike Force
- Bug Attack
- Caught Barehanded
- Bizarre Dinos
- America's Deadly Obsession
- The Rise Of Black Wolf
- Saved From The Spill
- Super Pride
- Predator CSI
- Blue Collar Dogs
- World's Worst Venom
- Spain's Last Lynx
- Orca Killing School
- Bite Me With Dr. Mike Leahy
- Polar Bear Alcatraz
- In The Womb
- Sahara
- Ultimate Vipers
- Amazon Claws
- Amazonia's Giant Jaws
- Animal Autopsy
- Off The Clock
- 21st Century Shark
- The Pack
- Crocs Of Katuma
- Dino Autopsy
- Hammerhead Highway
- Clan Of The Meerkat
- Eye of the Leopard
- Kalahari Supercats
- Secrets Of The King Cobra
- Croc Ganglands
- Spine Chillers
- Superfish
- Street Monkeys
- Anaconda
- Phantom Wolverine
- Secret Shark Pits
- Dive to Tiger Central
- Quest For The Megafish Of The Amazon
- Spain's Last Lynx
- The Pack
- Penguin Death Zone
- Anaconda: Queen Of The Serpents
- The Dark Side Of Elephants

== Other National Geographic channels in Greece ==
=== National Geographic Music ===
National Geographic Music was a subscription television network which broadcast documentaries concerning 'the meeting between music and culture' around the world. It was available in Greece only in Cosmote TV and in OnTV. It stopped broadcasting in 2011 around the world, including Greece.

=== Nat Geo Wild ===
National Geographic Wild is a subscription television network which broadcasts documentaries about natural wildlife and wildlife history, with a focus on natures most fierce predators. It is available in Cosmote TV, Vodafone TV and Nova and in Cyprus it is available on Nova, Cablenet and CytaVision.

=== National Geographic HD ===
National Geographic HD (NGC HD) in Greece is a 720p high definition simulcast of the National Geographic in Greece. It launched on 22 December 2010. It is available in Cosmote TV, Vodafone TV and Nova and in Cyprus it is available on Nova, Cablenet and CytaVision.

=== Nat Geo Wild HD ===
Nat Geo Wild HD in Greece is a 720p high definition simulcast of the Nat Geo Wild in Greece. It launched on 17 March 2011 and is available in Cosmote TV, Vodafone TV and Nova and in Cyprus it is available on Nova, Cablenet and CytaVision.

== See also ==
- FX Greece
- FX Life Greece
