= FX Life (Russia, Baltics & CIS) =

Russian language television channel owned by Disney

- Country: Baltics; CIS
- Headquarters: Moscow, Russia

Programming
- Languages: English; Lithuanian (subtitles); Latvian (subtitles); Estonian (subtitles); Russian
- Picture format: 16:9, 1080p (HDTV)

Ownership
- Owner: The Walt Disney Company CIS (Disney Entertainment)
- Parent: 20th Century Television
- Sister channels: REN TV; FX; National Geographic; National Geographic Wild; BabyTV

History
- Launched: 15 April 2008 (Russia, Baltics & CIS); 5 November 2008 (Estonia)
- Closed: 1 October 2022 (Belarus & Russia)
- Replaced by: Sapfir (Russia)
- Former names: Fox Life (2008–2024)

Links
- Website: www.fxchannel.ee

Final logo as Fox Life, used from 2008 to 2024

FX Life (previously Fox Life) is a Russian-English language television channel that launched in 2008.

The channel launched in Russia, Baltics and CIS on April 15, 2008 as Fox Life. It launched in Estonia on November 5, 2008.

The channel was closed on October 1, 2022, for Russia & Belarus, and was replaced by Sapfir in Russia, but it's still active in the CIS & Baltic regions. Cable operators in Estonia have localized version of the channel with advertising. The channel has rebranded as FX Life on 24 January 2024.

== Programming ==
=== Current programming ===
- The Americans
- Bay Yanlış
- Body of Proof
- Castle
- Grey's Anatomy
- M.O.D.O.K
- Only Murders in the Building
- Revenge
- Station 19
- White Collar

=== Former programming ===
- According to Jim
- Army Wives
- Bones
- Brothers & Sisters
- Cane
- Chicago Fire
- Cougar Town
- Cupid
- Desperate Housewives
- Dirty Sexy Money
- Eli Stone
- Episodes
- Extreme Makeover
- FlashForward
- Game of Thrones
- Gary Unmarried
- Ghost Whisperer
- Grease: Rise of the Pink Ladies
- Happy Endings
- Head Case
- Hope & Faith
- Huff
- iZombie
- Jane By Design
- The Listener
- Look-a-Like
- Mad Men
- Melissa & Joey
- Mental
- Missing
- My Wife and Kids
- No Ordinary Family
- Off the Map
- Once and Again
- Once Upon a Time
- Our Kind of People
- Private Practice
- Raising the Bar
- The Resident
- Rise
- Samantha Who?
- Scandal
- Sen Çal Kapımı
- Señoras del (h)AMPA
- So You Think You Can Dance
- The Starter Wife
- Tiempo final
- True Blood
- Ugly Betty
- Weeds

== See also ==
- Star Life (international)
- FX Life (Greek TV channel)
- FX
