= Star TV =

Star TV may refer to:

- Starz, an American premium cable and satellite television network owned by Starz Inc.
  - Starz Encore, a direct sister network to Starz
- E! (Canadian TV channel) (formerly Star!), a Canadian entertainment news channel
- Las Estrellas (Spanish for The Stars), the Mexican television network
- Estrella TV (Spanish for Star TV), the American Spanish-language network
- Star, an international television and streaming brand owned by Disney Entertainment unit of The Walt Disney Company
  - Disney Networks Group Asia Pacific, a Hong Kong–based commercial broadcasting company, the original incarnation of the brand under its previous name Star TV
  - Star (Disney+), a general entertainment hub within Disney+ available in some countries where Disney+ is operated
  - Star+, a defunct streaming service in Latin America owned by Disney
  - Star Channel (international), a successor television channel brand to the international Fox channel brand acquired by Disney in 2019
  - Disney Star (formerly known as Star India), previously a part of Star in Hong Kong, now a distinct division owned by Disney
    - Star India v Leo Burnett, Indian copyright case law
  - Star China Media, a media group in Mainland China, previously part of the Star TV Hong Kong group but now owned by China Media Capital
- Star Cinema, a Filipino film and television production company and distributor
- Star Television Network, a short-lived American television network based in Orlando, Florida
- Startv, a Canadian weekly entertainment television program
- Star TV (Australia), a former television network in Queensland
- Star TV (Tanzania), a television station in Tanzania
- Star TV (Turkey), a general entertainment channel in Turkey
- Zvezda (TV channel) (Russian for Star), a military-themed Russian television channel owned by the Russian Ministry of Defense
- Satellite Television & Associated Resources A defunct American subscription OTA television service that was known to have carried the Star TV brand for its OTA affiliates in the early 1980s.

== See also ==
- Star Channel (disambiguation)
- Star-world (disambiguation)
- Star News (disambiguation)
- Star Sports (disambiguation)
- Star One (disambiguation)
- Star Plus, Indian television channel owned by Disney Star
- Start TV, an American free-to-air television network
- StarHub TV, a cable television operator in Singapore
