= Fox (channel) =

This set index article contains the following titles with the word "Fox" in the name; referring to numerous media, sports and entertainment ventures currently in or out of operation over the years:

- Fox Corporation is an American company which is connected with:
  - Fox (international), which included:
    - Fox (Asian TV channel)
    - Fox (German TV channel)
    - Fox (African TV channel)
    - Fox (Norwegian TV channel)
    - Fox (Italian TV channel)
    - Fox (Hungarian TV channel)
  - Fox News
  - Fox Life
  - Fox Sports, which includes many channels, as well as four divisions:
    - Fox Sports (Argentina)
    - Fox Sports (Australia)
    - Fox Sports (Mexico)
    - Fox Sports (United States)
  - Fox Television Stations, which operates many stations
- Fox8, originally just called "Fox"
- Fox Filipino
- Star Channel (Latin America), originally called "Fox" and "Fox Channel"
