= Star Sports =

Star Sports refers to several current or former Asian sports networks owned by The Walt Disney Company:

- Star Sports (China)
- Star Sports (India)
- Fox Sports (Asian TV network)

== See also ==
- Star TV (disambiguation)
