= FX Life =

International television networks owned by Disney

- Country: Greece, Cyprus; Baltics; CIS
- Headquarters: Athens; Moscow

Programming
- Languages: English; Greek (subtitles); Lithuanian (subtitles); Latvian (subtitles); Estonian (subtitles); Russian
- Picture format: 16:9, 1080p (HDTV)
- Timeshift service: FX Life Western/FX Life Eastern

Ownership
- Owner: Disney International Operations
- Parent: 20th Century Fox Television
- Sister channels: FX; National Geographic; Nat Geo Music; REN TV

History
- Launched: 15 March 2023 (Greece & Cyprus); 24 January 2024 (Baltics & CIS)
- Replaced: Fox Life

Links
- Website: www.fxchannel.gr www.fxchannel.ee

FX Life is an international pay television network, owned by Disney Entertainment, a division of The Walt Disney Company, as a replacement to Fox Life. The network has been discontinued in several markets over time, and is currently active in Greece, Baltics and CIS.

It was launched in Greece on March 15, 2023 as replacement for Fox Life in order to avoid confusion with Fox Corporation and to avoid having the Star trademark in Greece as another unaffiliated channel, Star Channel has owned the trademark, and CIS and Baltic regions on January 24, 2024.

== Current channels ==
=== Baltics and CIS ===
- FX Life (previously Fox Life) is a Russian-language television channel that launched on April 15, 2008. The channel was closed on October 1, 2022, for Russia & Belarus, and was replaced by Sapfir in Russia, but it's still active in the CIS & Baltic regions. Cable operators in Estonia have localized version of the channel with advertising. The channel has rebranded as FX Life on 24 January 2024.

=== Greece ===
- FX Life (formerly as Fox Life) is a Greek channel launched on December 1, 2008. On March 15, 2023, Fox Life was replaced by FX Life, along with Fox becoming FX.

== See also ==
- Star Life (international)
- FX Life (Greek TV channel)
- FX
