= Steve Dildarian =

American actor, filmmaker, and painter

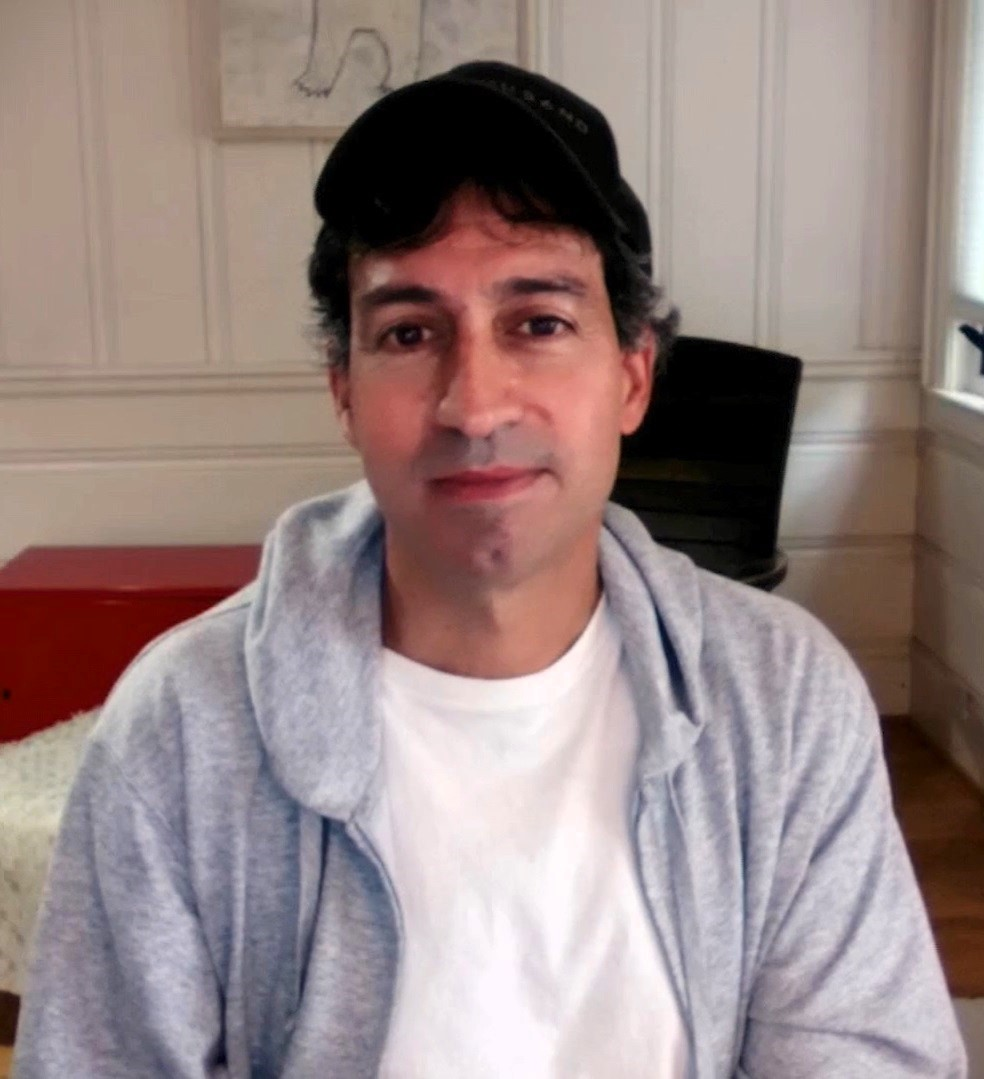
Dildarian in 2023

Steve Dildarian is an American filmmaker, actor, animator, painter, and former advertising copywriter. He is the creator and voice of Tim in the animated television series The Life & Times of Tim. He is also the creator and voice of Tom in the HBO Max series Ten Year Old Tom, and the animated web series Fred Has Problems.

== Biography ==
Dildarian grew up in East Brunswick Township, New Jersey and graduated from Glassboro State College (now Rowan University). During his advertising career, he worked for several ad agencies, including BBDO and Goodby, Silverstein & Partners. In 2006, Dildarian created an animated short film called Angry Unpaid Hooker, which won the best animated short at the U.S. Comedy Arts Festival, and is the basis for The Life & Times of Tim. Dildarian's animation is characterized by a raw, minimalist, two-dimensional style - similar to Mike Judge's Beavis and Butt-head series. Along with MJ Otto, Dildarian also starred in a web series entitled KAB Man. The series was commissioned by Keep America Beautiful (KAB) to raise awareness about environmental issues. It is composed of three five-minute episodes available on YouTube and on KAB man's companion website, www.kabman.org.
