= Star Channels =

Group of Middle Eastern premium television networks

- Broadcast area: Middle East and North Africa
- Headquarters: Abu Dhabi

Programming
- Languages: English; Arabic
- Picture format: 1080i (HDTV 16:9)

Ownership
- Owner: The Walt Disney Company EMEA (Disney Entertainment)

History
- Launched: March 1, 2024; 2 years ago

Star Channels are a multiplex suite of premium Middle Eastern and North African subscription television channels owned by The Walt Disney Company EMEA. Its programming consisted mostly of non-dubbed movies and series with Arabic subtitles.

== History ==
The network started launching in Middle East on January 24, 2006, by Fox International Channels EMEA with the launch of Fox Series and on March 1, 2011, the channel was renamed as Fox. The suite was built as Star Channels on March 1, 2024, as Disney de-emphasized use of the Fox brand.

On February 2, 2024, Disney announced that they would rebrand the Fox branded channels in Middle East to Star on March 1, 2024, as it pushed the Star branding from regional Asian use to worldwide outside of North America to avoid brand licensing fees to Fox Corporation for the continued use of the Fox trademark on active television networks, with "Star Series" and "Star Action" name were re-used from the defunct Latin American Star Premium multiple suits of television channels. In the fourth quarter of 2024, Star Films, Star Life and Star Series silently stopped airing.

== Channels ==
=== Current ===
Channel	Image	Genre
Star Action		Action, horror, and suspense films and series
Star Movies		Hollywood films
Star World		Comedy, drama, and unscripted lifestyle content

=== Former ===
Channel	Logo	Genre	Closure date
Star Films		Hollywood films	November 1, 2024
Star Life		Local and global unscripted lifestyle content	November 1, 2024
Star Series		First-run series and new episodes for acclaimed series	November 1, 2024
