= Star Series =

- Broadcast area: Middle East and North Africa
- Headquarters: Abu Dhabi, United Arab Emirates

Programming
- Languages: English; Arabic
- Picture format: 1080i (HDTV 16:9)

Ownership
- Owner: The Walt Disney Company EMEA (Disney Entertainment)
- Sister channels: Disney Channel; Disney Junior; Star Life; Star Films; Star Movies; Star Action; Star World

History
- Launched: 1 March 2024; 2 years ago
- Replaced: Fox (Series)
- Closed: 1 November 2024; 2 years ago

Availability

Streaming media
- Shahid.net (MENA): Watch online

Star Series was a Middle Eastern and North African pay television channel that was launched on 1 March 2024 replacing the Middle Eastern version of Fox. It adopted the name of one of multiplex Star Premium channels in Latin America that originally was used in 2021. It closed on November 1, 2024.

== See also ==
- Fox
- Star Premium, where Star Series name originated
