= Disney Channel (Europe, Middle East and Africa) =

Children's pay television channel

Disney Channel EMEA
- New logo since 24 June 2022
- Country: United Kingdom
- Broadcast area: Africa; Balkans; Baltics; Cyprus; Middle East
- Headquarters: 3 Queen Caroline Street, Hammersmith, London W6 9PE

Programming
- Languages: English; Arabic (dubbing/subtitles); Greek (dubbing/subtitles); Albanian (subtitles; formerly); Serbian (subtitles; formerly); Croatian (subtitles; formerly); Slovene (subtitles; formerly)
- Picture format: HDTV 1080i; SDTV 576i

Ownership
- Owner: The Walt Disney Company Limited; Disney Kids & Family (Disney Entertainment)
- Sister channels: List: BabyTV; Disney Jr.; National Geographic; National Geographic Abu Dhabi; National Geographic Wild; Star Channels; FX

History
- Launched: 2 April 1997; 29 years ago (MENA feed); 25 September 2006; 20 years ago (Africa); 8 November 2009; 16 years ago (Greece and Cyprus); 2009-2012 (distribution in the Balkans); 28 February 2023; 3 years ago (distribution in the Baltics); 5 June 2023; 3 years ago (distribution in the Nordics)
- Closed: 1 April 2024; 2 years ago (distribution in the Nordics)

Links
- Website: Sub-Saharan African website; English MENA website; Arabic MENA website; Greek website

Disney Channel is a British-managed children's pay television channel owned and operated by The Walt Disney Company Limited, the international business division of the Walt Disney Company serving television markets across the Middle East (except Iran, Israel, Syria, and Turkey), North Africa, Sub-Saharan Africa, Greece, Cyprus, the Baltics, Balkans (excluding Albania, Bulgaria, Romania and Moldova, including Croatia and Slovenia).

Originally launched on 2 April 1997 as a channel in the Middle East and North Africa; exclusively for Orbit TV (now OSN) subscribers, it began expanding to markets in Sub-Saharan Africa in 2006 and the Balkans.

The channel previously used to cover Poland and Turkey, with respective audio tracks for the two markets, until 2010 and 2012 respectively when two fully-localized feeds were launched for the two countries. In Albania, the EMEA feed was previously available from 2012 to 2018, with Albanian subtitles available for programs.

Majority of programming from Disney Channel are also available on Disney+ throughout the regions and South Africa.

== History ==
Disney Channel, then known as The Disney Channel began broadcasting on 2 April 1997 on satellite provider Orbit (now OSN) in the Middle East and North Africa region. At first, the channel was only available in English, but on 1 April 1998, a separate Arabic sub-feed was added. Animated films and series were dubbed in Arabic, while live-action films and series were subtitled. Disney Channel Middle East was then picked up by satellite provider Showtime in fall 2001. The channel featured the logos (resembling Mickey Mouse head) in two versions (the one with the channel's name written in English and the other in Arabic for each feed), until June 2003 when it adopted the 2002 US Disney Channel logo.

Somewhere at that time, both the Arabic and English feeds of the channel were merged. In consequence, on 3 January 2005 Disney Channel Middle East started to simulcast Disney Channel Scandinavia, including its schedule and the prints of the series and movies for this feed (which were modified to also include Arabic dubbing credits). Then somewhere between November and December 2005, Disney Channel Scandinavia and Middle East started to add dubbing credits to its programming through subtitles.

Disney Channel Scandinavia and Middle East started gradually becoming individual feeds in 2006, starting with a different rotation of films (that gradually got more different), though this did not stop Arab satellite provider Orbit from adding a Swedish audio track to the Middle Eastern feed on 16 April 2007 (which was subsequently removed years later).

The Middle Eastern feed became a pan-regional network, as the channel was launched in Sub-Saharan Africa on 25 September 2006, Poland on 2 December 2006, Turkey on 29 April 2007; and Greece along with Cyprus on 8 November 2009.

In September 2009, when the feed separation from Disney Channel Scandinavia was complete, the Middle East feed (now broadcasting in most of the EMEA region) started to share promotions and events with the CEE feed.

On 1 August 2010, the EMEA feed in Poland was separated and replaced with a fully localized Polish feed.

On 12 January 2012, Disney Channel EMEA in Turkey was replaced by an independent Turkish feed, and became a free-to-air network.

Between 2009 and 2012, Disney Channel EMEA began broadcasting in the former Yugoslavia (Serbia, Croatia, Montenegro, North Macedonia, Bosnia, Slovenia) and Albania.

The channel adopted a new logo and underwent a rebrand on 21 July 2014. In 2015, Disney Channel EMEA switched its aspect ratio from 4:3 to 16:9.

In 2017, a high-definition feed of the channel was launched. It includes Arabic subtitles for live-action films and TV series. Also in that year, Disney Channel EMEA rebranded using the 2017 European branding package. And in August 2018, the Albanian transmission ceased.

On 24 June 2022, Disney Channel EMEA, Israel, Spain and Portugal rebranded its graphics with the new graphical branding Signature Strokes, and with the customized wordmark logo; designed by Flopicco from Rome, Italy.

== Availability ==
=== Middle East and North Africa ===
The Middle East sub-feed is the oldest sub-feed, and began broadcasting in the Middle East and North Africa on 2 April 1997. The feed is currently available in both English and Arabic. The vast majority of all animated series can be watched with Arabic dubbing, but live-action programs are almost always aired in English only with Arabic subtitles instead. It also has its own website, which is offered with English and Arabic versions. On 31 December 2023, Disney Channel was removed off the OSN cable provider because OSN did not renew its contract with Disney to offer its channels in its catalog, and was replaced by Cartoon Network later that night.

On 27 February 2025, Disney Channel and Disney Jr were added to beIN Channels Network packages.

=== Sub-Saharan Africa ===
Launched on 25 September 2006 on Multichoice's DStv, it later went 24 hours since 2007. Broadcasting in most of Sub-Saharan Africa. This feed airs programs in English only, without foreign-language subtitles.

=== Greece & Cyprus ===
Launched in Greece and Cyprus on 8 November 2009 on NOVA. The feed is currently available in both English and Greek. Most programs, whether animated or live-action, are generally dubbed into Greek on this sub-feed, although some programs are aired with Greek subtitles instead. It also has a Greek-language website.

=== Other countries ===
Expanded between 2009 and 2012 with multiple distributors through Bosnia & Herzegovina, Croatia, Montenegro, North Macedonia, Serbia (including the disputed Kosovo) and Slovenia. All programs are exclusively aired with English audio, with Serbian, Croatian and Slovene subtitles. On February 28, 2023, the feed launched in the Baltic states (Estonia, Latvia, and Lithuania), replacing the Scandinavian feed (which was distributed on television provider Allente). The Scandinavian feed was itself replaced in the Nordics by the EMEA feed on 5 June 2023. The Scandinavian feed would relaunch on 2 April 2024 replacing the EMEA feed.

== Sister channels ==
=== Disney Jr. ===
Disney Jr. is a British-managed pan-regional and sister channel; focused on toddlers and preschoolers, aged 2–6 years old. It launched on September 1, 2010, in MENA, Sub-Saharan Africa, Greece & Cyprus as Playhouse Disney. On June 1, 2011, Disney Junior was launched, replacing Playhouse Disney.

On 31 May 2016, Disney Junior was launched in a full Arabic language counterpart; exclusively on OSN.

=== Disney XD (closed) ===
Disney XD was a British-managed pan-regional and sister channel; focused on older kids and teenagers (mostly boys). It was launched in the MENA, Greece, Serbia, Bosnia, Montenegro, Croatia, North Macedonia and Slovenia in 2009; and in Sub-Saharan Africa in May 2011.

In South Africa in June 2014, Multichoice fined R5000 (around $300) after failing to provide a warning before airing an advertisement for the fantasy drama series WolfBlood, containing horror scenes on the morning of 31 December 2013.

In 2018, an Arabic language counterpart launched.

The channel was later closed in Sub-Saharan Africa on 1 October 2020; the MENA region and in the Balkans, on 31 December 2020; and Greece on 31 January 2021.

== Logos ==
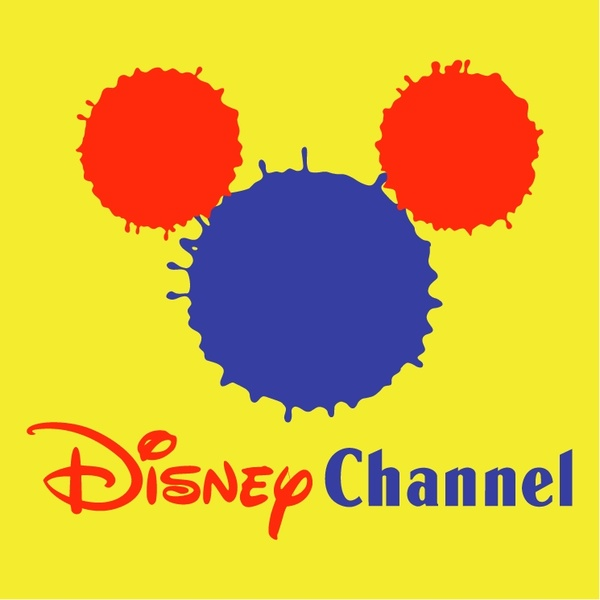
1997–2003

2003–2011

2011–2014

2014–2017

2017–2022

2022–present
