= Foreign exchange (disambiguation) =

Foreign exchange may refer to:

== Finance ==
- Foreign exchange market, where money in one currency is exchanged for another
  - Foreign exchange company, a broker that offers currency exchange and international payments
  - Retail foreign exchange platform, speculative trading of foreign exchange by individuals using electronic trading platforms
  - Bureau de change, a business whose customers exchange one currency for another
  - Currency pair, the quotation of the relative value of a currency unit against the unit of another currency in the foreign exchange market
  - Exchange rate, the price for which one currency is exchanged for another
  - Foreign-exchange reserves, holdings of other countries' currencies
- International trade, the exchange of goods and services across national boundaries

== Media ==
- Foreign Exchange (1970 film), a British television film
- Foreign Exchange (2008 film), a 2008 film starring Jennifer Coolidge
- Foreign Exchange (Australian/Irish TV series), a 2004 Australian television series that aired on Nine Network
- Foreign Exchange (CNBC World TV program), an American television business news program that has aired on CNBC World since 2005
- Foreign Exchange (PBS TV program), a 2005–2009 American weekly public television program, previously hosted by Fareed Zakaria, that aired on PBS
- The Foreign Exchange, a hip-hop duo

== Other uses ==
- Foreign exchange service (telecommunications), connection of a phone to a non-local office
- Foreign student exchange, a school program in which students study in another country for a time
- FC Forex Brașov, a Romanian professional football club from Braşov
