= Star-world =

star-world, StarWorld, Starworld, Star world, or variant, may refer to:

- Star World, Hong Kong–based English-language TV network
  - Star World India, TV network
  - Star World Premiere, Indian TV channel
  - Star World Philippines, TV network
- Starworld, apparel brand
- star world, star-world navigation in robotics
- Star World Championships or Star Worlds, sailing world championships for the Star-class
- Starworld (1981 novel), novel by Harry Harrison in the To the Stars
- Starworld Casino, casino located in the Malaysian First World Hotel
- Exoplanet, "star world" in poetic language
- Twelve Colonies, location in Battlestar Galactica elliptically referred to as the Star World.

== See also ==
- Star TV (disambiguation)
- WorldStar, hiphop vlog
