= Disney XD (Poland) =

Polish children's TV channel

- Country: United Kingdom
- Broadcast area: Poland
- Headquarters: 3 Queen Caroline Street, Hammersmith, London W6 9PE, United Kingdom

Programming
- Language: Polish (dubbing/subtitles)
- Picture format: 16:9 1080i HDTV; 16:9 576i SDTV

Ownership
- Owner: The Walt Disney Company Limited (80%); AMC Global Media (20%)
- Sister channels: Disney Channel; Disney Jr.

History
- Launched: 18 April 1998; 28 years ago (as Fox Kids); 1 January 2005; 21 years ago (as Jetix); 19 September 2009; 17 years ago (as Disney XD)
- Former names: Fox Kids (1998–2005); Jetix (2005–2009)

Links
- Website: Official Schedule

Disney XD is a Polish television channel owned and operated by The Walt Disney Company Limited.

Originally launched as Fox Kids on 18 April 1998, it relaunched as Jetix on 1 January 2005 and took on its current brand as Disney XD on 19 September 2009. The targeted ages are 6 to 15 years old. Since 10 April 2014, the channel broadcasts for 24 hours a day; before this date the channel was on-air for 18 hours, from 6:00 a.m. to midnight.

Following the closure of all of Disney XD's international channels, including the Canadian feed on 1 September 2025 due to existing financial pressure at Corus Entertainment, Disney XD Poland is the last remaining feed based outside of the United States still operating.

== Logos ==
1998–2005

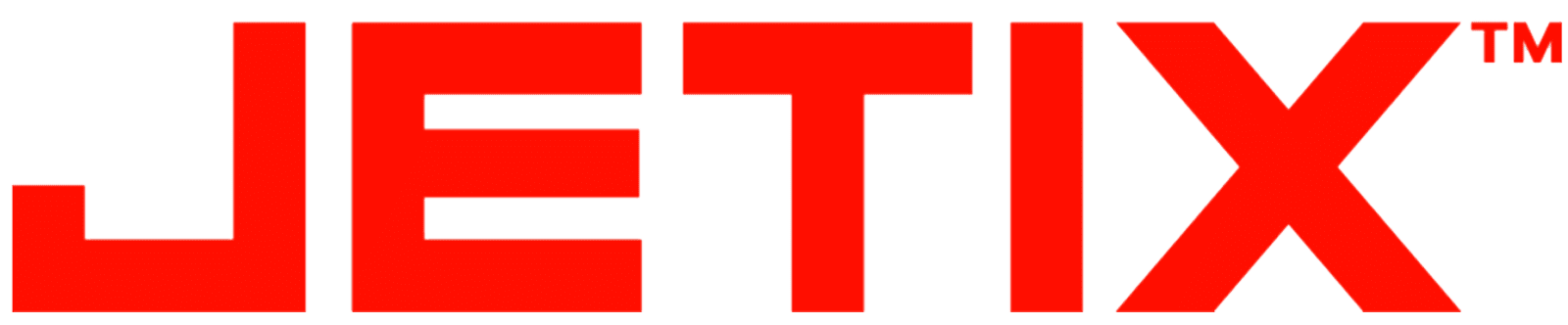
2005–2009

2009–2016

2016–present
