= FX (Turkish TV channel) =

- Country: Turkey

Programming
- Language: Turkish
- Picture format: 16:9, SDTV, HDTV

Ownership
- Owner: The Walt Disney Company EMEA (Disney Entertainment)
- Parent: The Walt Disney Company
- Sister channels: BabyTV; Disney Junior; Now; National Geographic; Nat Geo Wild

History
- Launched: April 14, 2008; 18 years ago

Links
- Website: www.fxturkiye.com.tr

FX is a Turkish pay television channel, launched by the Fox Networks Group, The American counterpart, which launched on April 14, 2008.

On January 1, 2021 and October 1, 2022, The Walt Disney Company announced that Fox Life and Fox Crime would be discontinued in Turkey, with part of its programming going to FX and the rest of the content moving to Disney+.

== Programming ==
=== Current programming ===
- Billions
- Bones
- Godfather of Harlem
- How I Met Your Mother
- The Late Late Show with James Corden
- Lost
- Tracker
- The Walking Dead
- Will Trent

=== Former programming ===
Sources:

- 24
- Alaska Daily
- The Amazing Race
- American Dad!
- American Horror Story
- The Andromeda Strain
- The Apprentice
- Around the World for Free
- Ashes to Ashes
- Battlestar Galactica
- Better Off Ted
- Bob's Burgers
- The Booth at the End
- Brickleberry
- Brotherhood
- Bullrun
- The Buried Life
- Burn Notice
- Call Me Fitz
- Charlie Jade
- CHAOS
- The Cleaner
- The Cleveland Show
- Community
- Cops
- CSI: Crime Scene Investigation
- Da Vinci's Demons
- Dhani Tackles The Globe
- Dollhouse
- Elementary
- Episodes
- Falling Skies
- Family Guy
- The Finder
- Flight of the Conchords
- Footballers' Lives
- Futurama
- Generation Kill
- The Goode Family
- The Good Guys
- Grey's Anatomy
- Hawaii Five-0
- Hell's Kitchen
- House
- Hustle
- It's Always Sunny in Philadelphia
- Jack Osbourne: No Limits
- Justified
- Kings
- Knight Rider
- K-Ville
- Last Man Standing
- Law & Order: Special Victims Unit
- The League
- The Life & Times of Tim
- Life on Mars
- Luther
- Matrioshki
- Men 7
- My Name Is Earl
- NCIS
- Numbers
- Out There
- Parks and Recreation
- Penny Dreadful
- The Rebel Billionaire
- The Resident
- The Rookie
- Salem
- Shaq Vs.
- The Simpsons
- Six Feet Under
- Sleeper Cell
- Sleepy Hollow
- So You Think You Can Dance
- Solitary
- Sons of Anarchy
- Stargate Universe
- The Strain
- Tales of the Walking Dead
- Terra Nova
- Thorne: Sleepyhead
- Traffic Light
- Treasure Hunters
- True Blood
- Tyrant
- Underbelly
- Under the Dome
- Wayward Pines
- Warehouse 13
- White Collar
- The X-Files
- You're the Worst
- MacGyver
