= The Life & Times of Tim =

Adult animated sitcom

- Season 3 promotional poster
- Genre: Animated sitcom
- Created by: Steve Dildarian
- Written by: Steve Dildarian
- Directed by: Steve Dildarian
- Voices of: Steve Dildarian; Mary Jane Otto; Matt Johnson; Nick Kroll; Peter Giles
- Theme music composer: Fred Rose; Hank Williams
- Opening theme: "I'll Never Get Out of This World Alive" by Hank Williams
- Country of origin: United States
- Original language: English
- No. of seasons: 3
- No. of episodes: 30

Production
- Executive producers: Steve Dildarian; Mike Clements; Tom Werner; Jimmy Miller; Leynete Cariapa (S2–3)
- Producer: Monica Mitchell
- Production companies: HBO Entertainment; Insane Loon Productions; Media Rights Capital; Warner Bros. Television (S2–3)

Original release
- Network: HBO
- Release: September 28, 2008 – February 17, 2012

The Life & Times of Tim is an American adult animated sitcom created by Steve Dildarian for HBO. It premiered on September 28, 2008. The series is about a hapless man in his mid-20s named Tim (voiced by Dildarian) who lives in New York City with his girlfriend Amy. Throughout the series, Tim constantly finds himself in increasingly awkward situations in both his work and personal life.

The first season aired in 2008 and has since been aired in numerous countries, and has developed a cult following. The second season debuted on February 19, 2010 on HBO. On June 4, 2010, HBO announced it was canceling the show. There were rumors that it was going to be picked up by another network. On August 16, 2010, it was announced HBO had reversed their original decision to cancel the show, and as a result, a third season was ordered. Season 3 of The Life and Times of Tim premiered on December 16, 2011.

The show aired its last original episode on February 17, 2012, and on April 20, HBO cancelled the series after three seasons.

The theme song is "I'll Never Get Out of This World Alive" performed by country music star Hank Williams.

== Production ==
It is the first HBO animated original since Todd McFarlane's Spawn, which aired from 1997 to 1999. It was originally developed for Fox in 2007, but was instead picked up by HBO for 10 episodes. The first season ran from September 28, 2008 to November 30, 2008 on HBO.

Dildarian, in addition to providing the voice of Tim, serves as the series' executive producer. Dildarian is most notable for his famous "Budweiser Lizards" campaign. He is also known for his animated short Angry Unpaid Hooker, which was awarded the Best Animated Short at the 2006 Comedy Arts Festival in Aspen and is the basis for The Life & Times of Tim. Tom Werner (That '70s Show, 3rd Rock from the Sun, and The Cosby Show), Jimmy Miller (Talladega Nights: The Ballad of Ricky Bobby and Borat) and Mike Clements executive produce as well.

== Cast ==
- Steve Dildarian as Tim, the title character and protagonist. Tim is an unassuming white-collar worker for "Omnicorp", a fictional corporation in New York City. Although well-meaning, he almost always finds himself in greatly embarrassing scenarios, often as a consequence of bad judgment or lying.
- MJ Otto as Amy, Tim's long-suffering girlfriend.
- Nick Kroll as Stu, Tim's stoner best friend and co-worker.
- Matt Johnson as Rodney, Tim's other friend, assistant to The Boss, Staten-Island guido-type, and Stan, a constantly angry, vulgar Omnicorp employee.
- Peter Giles as The Boss (aka Percy Davis), the self-absorbed head of OmniCorp.
- Bob Morrow as Debbie the Prostitute; Gay Gary; additional characters.
  - Alan Tudyk took over as the voice of Debbie in season 3.

Julianne Grossman, Edie McClurg, Andrew Daly, Jon Daly, Kari Wahlgren, Brian Scolaro, Melanie Lynskey, Jamie Denbo, Rick Gomez, and Eddie Pepitone provide additional voices in various episodes.

Guest voices included Bob Saget as Tim's coworker Party Marty; Bob Einstein as Elephant Trainer and The Bookie; Jeff Garlin as Stu's dad; Cheri Oteri as Bashko's daughter Blobsnark; Daniel Tosh as Theo the "Internet Technology" guy; Trevor Moore as Larry, owner of "Larry's Bras & Hooker Outfits"; Aziz Ansari; Elliott Gould as Dr. Fishman; Bob Odenkirk as the "Bathroom Guy"; Marc Wootton as Ringmaster; and Billy Dee Williams as himself, and Tim Meadows as himself.

== Episodes ==
Each 30-minute episode consists of two 14-minute segments.

=== Series overview ===
Season	Episodes	Originally released	
Season	Episodes	First released	Last released
1	10	September 28, 2008	November 30, 2008
2	10	February 19, 2010	April 30, 2010
3	10	December 16, 2011	February 17, 2012

=== Season 1 (2008) ===
No. overall	No. in season	Title	Original release date
1	1	"Angry Unpaid Hooker/Rodney's Bachelor Party"	September 28, 2008
Tim tries to explain to his girlfriend and her parents why a prostitute is in his apartment; Rodney tells the office staff a made-up story about what Tim did at his bachelor party.
2	2	"Latino Tim/The Priest Is Drunk"	October 5, 2008
Tim's boss asks him to act like he's the Hispanic Vice President of his company, to which he grudgingly agrees; while at his girlfriend's sister's wedding, Tim strikes up a conversation with an unconventional priest.
3	3	"Senior Prom/Tim Fights an Old Man"	October 12, 2008
To get a promotion, Tim agrees to take his boss's daughter to her senior prom; Tim gets into fight with an elderly man after offering him his seat on the bus.
4	4	"Mad Dog Tim/Monday Night Confession"	October 19, 2008
Tim's co-workers give him a new nickname; Tim confesses something extremely embarrassing he did while at a baptism.
5	5	"Tim, Stu and Marie/Miss February"	October 26, 2008
Stu invites Tim to join him on his first date with Marie, which Tim later regrets; Tim makes a critical mistake while buying Amy's Valentine's-Day gift.
6	6	"Bashko's Hairy Daughter/Tim's Not Singing"	November 2, 2008
Tim tries to help Bashko's daughter get a good job; Debbie tries to help Tim when he messes up with his co-workers.
7	7	"Hottest Babes on the Planet/Suck It Philly"	November 9, 2008
Tim gets into trouble after Rodney and Stu pull a prank in the office; Tim shows Amy's father a good time.
8	8	"Insurmountable High Score/Tim vs. the Baby"	November 16, 2008
Tim accidentally messes up the mail guy's life in a bad way; Amy begins to think that Tim is anti-baby after he rebukes a woman breastfeeding in a café.
9	9	"Mugger/Cin City"	November 23, 2008
Tim tries to help the mugger who attacks him on the subway; Tim is sent on a business trip with one of his older co-workers.
10	10	"Theo Strikes Back/Amy Gets Wasted"	November 30, 2008
Tim's boss encourages him to have an affair with his wife; after Amy gets naked at a party in front of Stu, she gives Tim a free pass to do whatever he wants.

=== Season 2 (2010) ===
No. overall	No. in season	Title	Original release date	Viewers (millions)
11	1	"Tim's Beard/Unjustly Neglected Drama"	February 19, 2010	0.126
Tim's post-breakup beard receives a negative reception at the office; Stu's pot dealer (Will Forte) persuades Tim and Stu to attend his play.
12	2	"The Comeback Sermon/Atlantic City"	February 26, 2010	0.120
Tim helps the priest (Rick Gomez) return from his suspension; Tim, Stu and Rodney take the day off from work to go to Atlantic City, where they run into a familiar-looking stripper (Jamie Denbo).
13	3	"Legend of the Month/Marie's Dead Husband"	March 5, 2010	N/A
A female firefighter (Missi Pyle) tells Tim to claim she saved him; Tim discovers a secret about Marie.
14	4	"The Girl Scout Incident/Rodney Has a Wife"	March 12, 2010	0.179
After being accused of hating children for not buying Girl Scout cookies at work, Tim agrees to take a Boy Scout troop on a camping trip; Tim assists Rodney in winning back his wife Rochelle (Debi Mazar), who is cheating on Rodney with a hockey player (Andrew Daly).
15	5	"Pharmaceutical Sales Rep Gone Wild/Amy's Got a Gun"	March 19, 2010	0.166
Tim is caught in the middle of a battle between a sleazy doctor (Jason Mantzoukas) and a suicidal pharmaceutical sales rep (Jessica St. Clair); Amy goes overboard when she buys a gun after getting mugged.
16	6	"The Salty Jazz/Jews Love to Laugh"	March 26, 2010	0.130
The Boss spends a night out with Tim, Rodney and Stu; Amy's Jewish friend (James Urbaniak) regrets buying Tim's favorite bar.
17	7	"Nagging Blonde/Tim & the Elephant"	April 9, 2010	0.104
Tim tries to get his rightfully earned money from a gambling addict (Aziz Ansari); when Stu falls in love with an elephant-cruelty protester (Casey Wilson), one of the animals grows attached to Tim.
18	8	"Debbie's Mom/The Escape Artist"	April 16, 2010	0.184
After Debbie is stung by a bee, Tim meets Debbie's mom (Jennifer Coolidge) and learns some disturbing details about his future; Tim is picked from the audience to assist an escape artist (Paul F. Tompkins) at a work retreat.
19	9	"Personality Disorder/Stu Is Good at Something"	April 23, 2010	0.108
Tim's costume gets him in trouble at work and diagnosed with a personality disorder by a child psychologist (Elliott Gould), which his boss wants to take advantage of; when Stu discovers he has a new talent after the elder O'Flaherty (J.K. Simmons) replaces the bar pool table with a ping-pong table, he takes on a tough challenger (Judah Friedlander).
20	10	"London Calling/Novelist"	April 30, 2010	0.197
The Chairman of Omnicorp (Alfred Molina) takes a liking to Tim; Tim decides to become a writer after an interesting meeting with a drunken novelist (Philip Baker Hall).

=== Season 3 (2011–12) ===
No. overall	No. in season	Title	Original release date	Viewers (millions)
21	1	"The Model from Newark/Tim's Hair Looks Amazing"	16 December 2011	0.082
Tim becomes an assistant to a women's professional basketball player (Kym Whitley); Tim must find a new barbershop.
22	2	"Percey Davis Boulevard/Cool Uncle Stu Balls"	23 December 2011	0.131
The Boss seeks Tim's help when a parade is held in his honor; Stu feels rejected when his nephew (Paul Rust) stops by for a visit.
23	3	"The Caddy's Shack/The Sausage Salesman"	30 December 2011	0.078
Tim gets back his high-school job as a golf caddy; Tim tells Amy's parents he's a sausage salesman.
24	4	"Super Gay Eduardo/The Pros and Cons of Killing Tim"	6 January 2012	0.118
Tim tries to help an immigrant worker (Horatio Sanz); former Omnicorp employees file a class-action lawsuit with Tim as a key witness.
25	5	"A Tale of Two Rodneys/Keith to the Rescue"	13 January 2012	0.165
Tim ends up with a female assistant named Rodney (Natasha Leggero); the Boss goes to extremes to keep his dog following a divorce.
26	6	"Pudding Boy/The Celebrity Who Shall Remain Nameless"	20 January 2012	0.107
Tim is embarrassed by his past on a business trip; Tim and Amy move into a new co-op building, but are confused by a confidentiality agreement.
27	7	"Strip Club Hostage Situation/Game Night"	27 January 2012	0.119
Tim's corporate credit-card bill breaks a company record; Game Night at Amy and Tim's is interrupted when Tim ventures out in bad weather to buy a popular game.
28	8	"Action-Packed Heist/Fall Foliage"	3 February 2012	0.115
The Boss uses a ruse to plan a heist to get Keith back from his ex-wife; Tim joins a fall foliage tour (led by Fred Willard) and embarrasses himself in several confusing mishaps.
29	9	"The Well Dressed Snitch/Pray for the Jets"	10 February 2012	0.101
Tim's inappropriate semi-formal attire and miscommunication over a shoot for GQ/GQ Magazine leads to more problems with OmniCorp; The priest returns with some gambling concerns that turn into problems for Tim (features Bob Einstein as bookie's voice).
30	10	"The Smug Chiropractor/Corporate Disaster"	17 February 2012	0.157
Tim is in trouble with one of Amy's friends (Rob Huebel) after implying that chiropractors are not doctors; Tim is elected as Omnicorp's new spokesperson after an Omnicorp-caused disaster.

== Release ==
The first season was released on DVD on February 9, 2010, the second on December 13, 2011, and the third season on December 18, 2012.

== International syndication ==
Country	Broadcasters	Time Slot	Notes
Australia	SBS2	Thursday, 9:10 pm	Premiered originally on Showcase on July 4, 2009.
Arab League	Showtime Arabia	Mon-Wed, 10:30 pm	Premiered June 10, 2009
Canada	HBO Canada, Teletoon at Night		Premiered October 30, 2009. Later, on August 2011.
Denmark	DR2	Fri, 9:25 pm	Premiered October 30, 2009
France	AB1	Saturdays, 22:25	
Greece	FX	Tuesdays, 22:30	(Repeat) Fridays 22:55
Hungary	TV6	Saturday-Sunday, 21:00	Premiered May 29, 2010
India	FX		
Ireland	RTÉ Two	Thursday, 11:55 pm	Premiered January 7, 2010
Israel	yes Stars Comedy	Sunday, 22:30	
Italy	DeeJay TV, FX		1st season aired from January 16, 2010, and 2nd season aired from April 12 to April 30, 2010
Malta	FX	Tuesdays, 21:30	(Repeat) Fridays 21:55
Netherlands	RTL 5, Comedy Central	2010	TBA
New Zealand	Comedy Central	Mondays 21:00	unknown
Norway	MAX	Saturdays, 17:50	
Portugal	FX		
Poland	Fox	Wednesdays, 22:00	(Repeat) Saturday 06:30, (Repeat) Sunday 23:50
Russia	2×2	Weekends 21:00	Premiered on "2x2 Animation Night" festival May 14, 2010, Premiered October 9, 2010 on TV. 2 seasons have aired to date.
Spain	Antena.neox	Tuesdays, 00:45	unknown
Sweden	Kanal 5	Mondays, 22:30	Premiered June 7, 2010
Turkey	FX		
UK	Sky Atlantic, Channel One	Monday, 10:00 pm	Premiered June 9, 2009
US	HBO		Premiered September 28, 2008
