= Look-a-Like =

Canadian reality television series

Look-a-Like is a Canadian reality television series that debuted on May 4, 2004 on CTV. It is produced by Kaleidoscope Entertainment.
