= The Brothers Solomon =

- Theatrical release poster
- Directed by: Bob Odenkirk
- Written by: Will Forte
- Produced by: Tom Werner; Matt Berenson
- Starring: Will Arnett; Will Forte; Chi McBride; Kristen Wiig; Malin Åkerman
- Cinematography: Tim Suhrstedt
- Edited by: Tracey Wadmore-Smith
- Music by: John Swihart
- Production companies: Revolution Studios; Carsey-Werner Productions
- Distributed by: Screen Gems (United States); TriStar Pictures (other territories)
- Release date: September 7, 2007
- Running time: 93 minutes
- Country: United States
- Language: English
- Budget: $10 million
- Box office: $1 million

The Brothers Solomon is a 2007 American surrealist comedy film directed by Bob Odenkirk and written by Will Forte. It features Will Arnett and Forte as the titular brothers, who set out to find romantic partners so they can give their comatose father (Lee Majors) a grandchild. Chi McBride, Kristen Wiig, and Malin Åkerman also star in supporting roles.

The film was theatrically released on September 7, 2007 in the United States by Screen Gems. However, on the home media release, it was released by TriStar Pictures. It received negative reviews from critics and was a box-office bomb, grossing $1 million worldwide with a $10 million budget.

== Plot ==
Brothers John Solomon and Dean Solomon have bad luck with women, due largely to their sheltered upbringing. They were raised by their single father, Ed, at an isolated research facility in the Arctic, and did not move to civilization until they were grown men. Despite their social limitations, the brothers are generally good-natured, if naïve, and consider their father the most important person in their life, as they even followed in his footsteps with their geology career. However, their lives are thrown into turmoil when Ed falls into a coma.

The brothers decide that they may be able to get him to wake up by giving him a grandson, the one thing he has always wanted. To make this a reality, the brothers immediately set out to find a woman who can give them a baby. The brothers have disastrous results in their initial attempts. John proposes marriage to a woman on the first date and when Dean finds a woman who is willing to have a child for them, she is hit by a bus and killed. To keep a better eye on their father, they move him into their home. John is able to use this as an opportunity to talk to his neighbor, Tara, who agrees to watch over their father when they leave the apartment.

The brothers decide to expand their search to include adoption. However, due to the bizarre circumstances, the adoption agency denies the request. They try Craigslist next, and are able to find a surrogate mother named Janine. Janine is a suitable fit, but she has a clingy ex-boyfriend named James, and demands $12,000 for her role. Over the course of the next nine months, the brothers learn how to be responsible parents, and Janine begins to warm up to the bizarre duo. John continues to flirt with Tara, and convinces himself that she is interested.

After a birthing class, Janine realizes that she wants to keep the baby. She tells the brothers the bad news, which culminates in Dean revealing to John that he heard Tara insult John behind his back, thus forcing John to realize that Tara is not interested in him. The two have a major fight, but after a day, the brothers reconcile. The brothers attempt to get Janine to let them raise the child with her by paying for an exorbitantly long sky banner. Janine decides to raise the baby with the two brothers and John tells Tara that he is no longer interested in her.

Soon, the child is born, however it is obvious that the baby is James's, not Dean's. A year passes, and the brothers have gone into business with Janine and James, starting up a store called "Solomon Family Baby-Proofing", which sells safety equipment for new parents. In the corner of the store, their father is kept, still in his coma. After hearing the baby say "grandpa", Ed finally wakes up from his coma and sees his grandson for the first time. The brothers are convinced that their adventures led to their father waking up from his coma. Everybody celebrates as one big, happy family.

== Cast ==
- Will Arnett as John Solomon
- Will Forte as Dean Solomon
- Chi McBride as James Coolwell
- Kristen Wiig as Janine Rice
- Malin Åkerman as Tara Anderson
- Lee Majors as Ed Solomon
- Bob Odenkirk as Jim Treacher
- Sam Lloyd as Dr. Spencer
- Charles Chun as Dr. Wong
- Jenna Fischer as Michelle
- Stephanie Courtney as Sara
- Bill Hader as Recumbent Biker
- Derek Waters as Video Store Guy
- Casey Wilson as Fertility Clinic Worker
- Nicole Randall Johnson as Birthing Instructor
- Ashley Johnson as Patricia
- Brian Scolaro as Medical Delivery Man

== Reception ==
The film was a box-office bomb, grossing only $1,035,056 out of a $10 million budget.

Reviews were negative. On Rotten Tomatoes, the film received a 17% approval rating based on 72 reviews with a weighted average of 3.8/10. The site's consensus reads, "Squandering its impressive cast with poorly-directed gags, The Brothers Solomon is a one-joke film stretched well beyond its limits." On Metacritic, the film received a score of 32 out of 100, based on 17 reviews. However, the film has received a favorable User Submitted Reviews score, which stands at 7.8 out of 10 as of May 2021, based on ratings from 43 users. On At the Movies with Ebert & Roeper, Richard Roeper claimed he walked out of the film - something he had never done before.
