= Mad Labs =

- Genre: Science
- Narrated by: David Baddiel
- Country of origin: United Kingdom
- Original language: English
- No. of episodes: 22

Production
- Running time: 30 minutes

Original release
- Network: National Geographic Channel

Mad Labs is a British TV documentary series for the National Geographic Channel. The show focuses mainly on "wacky" experiments and inventions that may prove useful in the near future such as urine-powered batteries or solar panels with olive oil being the key ingredient instead of silica.

While the show features real-life scientists and their inventions, a regular segment called "The Test Department" appears numerous times in an episode wherein the show's own testers perform experiments of their own.

== Production ==
The stories aired on National Geographic Channel and was produced by Maura Kealey, who had previously worked for CBC Television. The comedian David Baddiel narrated the show.

== Reception ==
Bill Brownstein of The Gazette said Mad Labs was "the TV series for brainiacs, the mildly warped and trivia lovers everywhere" and "an eye-opener". The Age reviewer Barbara Hooks compared it to the series I Didn't Know That in being "a grab bag of scientific trivia and technology". Writing for the Toronto Star, Disha Jani praised the show for having "a wacky announcer" and "way-cool experiments" that made the show filled with amusement but suggested it should "focus on the science behind the wackiness a bit more".

The Gold Coast Bulletin said Mad Labs "makes complicated science fun with plenty of oddball experiments" and said it showcases many "interesting and informative facts". The Times reviewer Angus Batey called it an "enjoyable if inessential new series" that the comedian David Baddiel narrates "in the Brainiac mould, which puts a quirky spin on science".
