= Star Channel (Serbian TV channel) =

- Country: Serbia
- Broadcast area: Albania, Bosnia and Herzegovina, Croatia, Kosovo, Montenegro, North Macedonia, Serbia, Slovenia
- Headquarters: Balkanska 2, Belgrade, Serbia

Programming
- Languages: Serbian, Croatian, Slovene (subtitles); English (audio)
- Picture format: 1080i HDTV (downscaled to 16:9 576i for the SDTV feed)

Ownership
- Owner: The Walt Disney Company Serbia (Disney Entertainment)
- Sister channels: 24Kitchen; Star Crime; Star Life; Star Movies; National Geographic; National Geographic Wild; Disney Channel; Disney Jr.

History
- Launched: 15 October 2012
- Former names: Fox (2012-2023)

Links
- Website: starchannel-rs.com starchannel-hr.com starchannel-si.com

Final logo as Fox, used from 2019 to 2023

Star Channel (formerly Fox) is a Serbian pay television channel broadcast in Serbia, Bosnia and Herzegovina, Montenegro, and North Macedonia, and owned by The Walt Disney Company Serbia. It was launched on 15 October 2012 and features programming from Fox, BBC, ABC, CBS and Freeform. On 9 May 2013, the channel launched its own HD simulcast feed. The channel was rebranded to Star Channel on 1 October 2023.

== Programming ==
=== Current Programming ===
- Beacon
- The Big Bang Theory
- The Blacklist
- Bones
- Castle
- CSI: Miami
- The Equalizer
- Ghosts
- Hawaii Five-0
- Lost
- Lucifer
- Malcolm in the Middle
- NCIS: Hawaiʻi
- Scorpion
- The Simpsons
- The Swarm
- Tracker
- Two and a Half Men

=== Former programming ===
- 9-1-1
- 9-1-1: Lone Star
- Agents of S.H.I.E.L.D.
- America's Funniest Home Videos
- American Horror Story
- American Dad!
- Archer
- Awake
- Blindspot
- The Borgias
- Brickleberry
- Buffy the Vampire Slayer
- Condor
- Continuum
- The Crazy Ones
- Criminal Minds
- Dexter
- Dollhouse
- Empire
- The Endgame
- Entourage
- Everybody Loves Raymond
- The Fades
- Family Guy
- The Flash
- Futurama
- The Gates
- Graceland
- Homeland
- It's Always Sunny in Philadelphia
- Last Man Standing
- Lie to Me
- The Listener
- The Lost Symbol
- Louie
- Mental
- The Millers
- Misfits
- Modern Family
- The New Normal
- Only Murders in the Building
- Out There
- Raising Hope
- S.W.A.T.
- Scream Queens
- Sherlock
- Sinbad
- Sleepy Hollow
- Spooks
- The Strain
- Terra Nova
- Traffic Light
- True Blood
- True Lies
- The Walking Dead
- Wayward Pines
- Wilfred
- The X Factor
- The X-Files
- Young Rock
