= Beat the Reaper =

Beat the Reaper may refer to:

- "Beat the Reaper", a comedy sketch by The Firesign Theatre on the 1968 album Waiting for the Electrician or Someone Like Him
- "Beat the Reaper", a 1972 single by Laurie Styvers
- "Beat the Reaper", an episode of the 1997 television series Ghost Stories
- Beat the Reaper (novel), a 2009 novel by Josh Bazell
