= Fox Comedy =

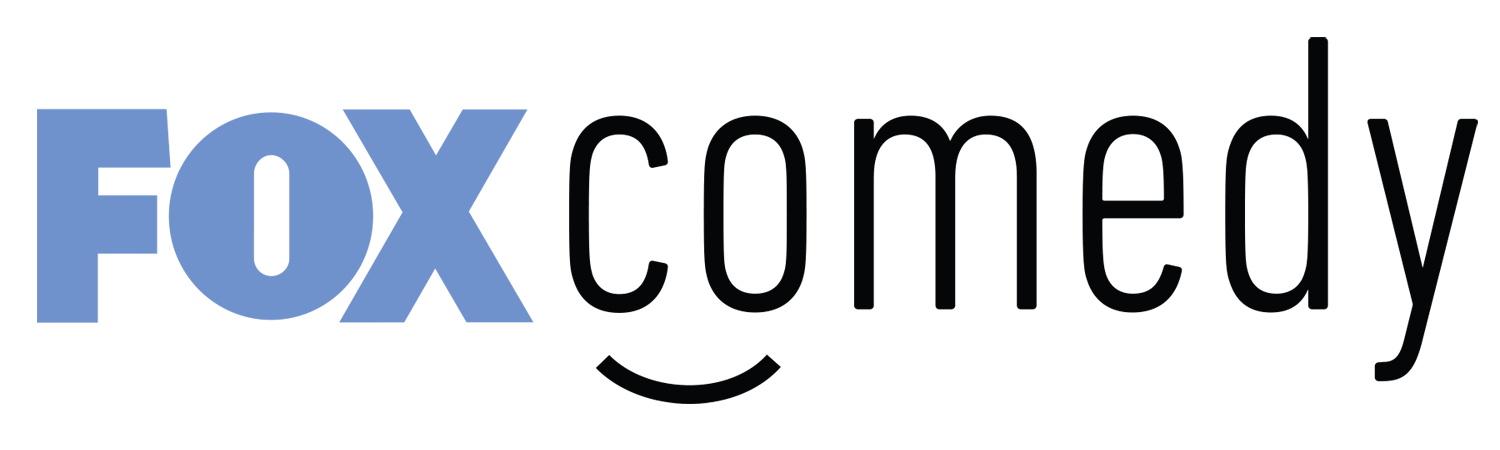
- Country: United States
- Broadcast area: Australia; Italy; Poland; Portugal

Programming
- Picture format: 576i (SDTV) 1080i (HDTV)

Ownership
- Owner: Fox Networks Group (The Walt Disney Company)
- Sister channels: Disney Channel; Disney Junior; Disney XD; Fox; Fox Life; Fox Crime; Fox Movies; FX; 24Kitchen; BabyTV; National Geographic; Nat Geo Wild; Nat Geo People

History
- Launched: November 1, 2014 (Italy); January 16, 2015 (Poland); November 18, 2015 (Portugal); September 1, 2020 (Australia)
- Closed: October 1, 2019 (Italy); September 26, 2023 (Australia); November 7, 2023 (Poland); February 7, 2024 (Portugal)
- Replaced by: Comedy (Australia); FX Comedy (Poland); Star Comedy (Portugal)
- Former names: Fox Life (2007–2015, Poland); FX (2007–2015, Portugal)

Fox Comedy is a television network, launched by the Fox Networks Group, which aired in Australia, Poland, Portugal, and Italy. Its basic programming included comedy series and films.

== History ==
It was launched in Italy on November 1, 2014, in Poland on January 16, 2015. and in Portugal on November 18, 2015 as replacement of FX.

The Italian version of Fox Comedy was closed down on October 1, 2019. On June 29, 2023, it was announced that Polish version would be renamed to FX Comedy on November 7, 2023.

There was also an Australian version of Fox Comedy, which launched on September 1, 2020, as a merger of Foxtel's Fox Hits and The Comedy Channel.

On September 6, 2023, the Australian version of Fox Comedy was replaced by Comedy .

On February 7, 2024, the Portuguese version shut down, and was replaced by Star Comedy.

== Fox Comedy around the world ==
Channel	Country or region	Formerly	Launch year	Replacement / rebrand	Shutdown year
Fox Comedy (Portugal)	Portugal, Angola, Mozambique and Cape Verde	FX	November 18, 2015	Star Comedy	February 7, 2024
Fox Comedy (Italy)	Italy	-	November 1, 2014	discontinued	October 1, 2019
Fox Comedy (Poland)	Poland	Fox Life	November 6, 2010	FX Comedy	November 7, 2023
Fox Comedy (Australia)	Australia	-	September 1, 2012	Comedy	September 26, 2023

== Programming ==
=== Fox Comedy Italy ===
- 1600 Penn
- Ben and Kate
- Boris
- Chuck
- Cristela
- Don't Trust the B— in Apartment 23
- Fresh Off the Boat
- Friends
- Friends with Benefits
- Friends with Better Lives
- The Grinder
- Hot in Cleveland
- How I Met Your Mother
- How to Live with Your Parents (For the Rest of Your Life)
- I Dream of Jeannie
- It's Always Sunny in Philadelphia
- The Jeffersons
- The Last Man on Earth
- Last Man Standing
- The League
- Louie
- Mad About You
- Modern Family
- My Wife and Kids
- The Nanny
- New Girl
- The New Normal
- Raising Hope
- Scrubs
- Sexy camera all'italiana
- Sexy Car Wash
- The Tonight Show
- Traffic Light
- Two and a Half Men
- Welcome to the Family
- Wilfred
- Will & Grace

== See also ==
- Fox Comedy (Polish TV channel)
- Fox Comedy (Portuguese TV channel)
- Fox Comedy (Australian TV channel)
