= Foreign Exchange (CNBC World TV program) =

- Presented by: Nick Hastings
- Countries of origin: United States; United Kingdom

Production
- Running time: 15 minutes

Original release
- Network: CNBC World
- Release: June 27, 2005 – present

Foreign Exchange, which debuted on June 27, 2005, is a business show on CNBC World focusing exclusively on trading in the currency markets.

Foreign Exchange is CNBC World's first original live program, is anchored by a rotating group of reporters from CNBC's Global Headquarters (was previously anchored by The Wall Street Journal's Bob O'Brien), and Dow Jones Newswires' Nick Hastings as a contributor from CNBC Europe headquarters in London.

The show now airs weekdays from 8:30 to 8:45 AM ET.
