= Ten Year Old Tom =

American adult animated sitcom

- Genre: Animated sitcom
- Created by: Steve Dildarian
- Directed by: Steve Dildarian
- Starring: Steve Dildarian; Byron Bowers; Edi Patterson; Todd Glass; Ben Rodgers; Erik Griffin; Gillian Jacobs; John Malkovich
- Opening theme: "Auntie Earth" by Walter Mitty and His Makeshift Orchestra
- Composer: Jeff Cardoni
- Country of origin: United States
- Original language: English
- No. of seasons: 2
- No. of episodes: 20 (40 segments)

Production
- Executive producers: Steve Dildarian; Nick Weidenfeld; Monica Mitchell; Robert Cohen; Marty Adelstein; Becky Clements; Alex Bulkley; Corey Campodonico; Karey Dornetto
- Running time: 24–26 minutes (12 minutes per segment)
- Production companies: Work Friends, LLC; Tomorrow Studios; ShadowMachine; Insane Loon Productions

Original release
- Network: HBO Max
- Release: September 30, 2021
- Network: Max
- Release: June 29, 2023

Ten Year Old Tom is an American adult animated sitcom created by Steve Dildarian for HBO Max. On July 1, 2022, the series was renewed for a second season which premiered on June 29, 2023.

The show is a spiritual successor to The Life & Times of Tim, which was also created by Steve Dildarian for HBO in 2008. It shares numerous similar features with the previous sitcom such as dialogue, animation and general humor.

The series made its linear debut on Adult Swim on August 9, 2023.

On January 12, 2024, creator Steve Dildarian revealed that Max cancelled the series after two seasons.

== Premise ==
Ten-year-old Tom navigates the challenges of childhood while contending with the questionable behavior and advice of the adults in his family, school, and community.

== Cast ==
=== Main ===
- Steve Dildarian as Thomas "Tom" Jimmy Buffett Jose Cuervo
- Byron Bowers as Nelson
- Edi Patterson as Tom's Mom
- Todd Glass as Principal
- Ben Rodgers as Bus Driver
- Erik Griffin as Coach
- Gillian Jacobs as Dakota
- John Malkovich as Mr. B
- Matt Johnson as Announcer
- Taylor Misiak as Yasmine
- Eugene Cordero as Hector
- George Wallace as Nelson's Dad

=== Recurring ===
- David Duchovny as Ice Cream Man
- Paul Rust as Randy
- Jennifer Coolidge as Dakota's Mom
- Jessica McKenna as Mrs. Band / various
- Mitra Jouhari as Nurse Denise
- Mark Proksch as Dakota's Dad
- Artemis Pebdani as Brenda

=== Guest ===
- Elliott Gould as Tom's Grandpa
- Sandy Martin as Tom's Grandma
- Tim Robinson as Plumber
- Thomas Lennon as Neighbor Rick
- Mary Lynn Rajskub as Rhonda

== Episodes ==
Series overview
| Season | Segments | Episodes | Originally released | Network |
|---|---|---|---|---|
| 1 | 20 | 10 | September 30, 2021 | HBO Max |
| 2 | 20 | 10 | June 29, 2023 | Max |

=== Season 1 (2021) ===
| No. overall | No. in season | Title | Directed by | Written by | Original release date |
|---|---|---|---|---|---|
| 1 | 1 | "The Bassoon Incident" | Steve Dildarian | Steve Dildarian | September 30, 2021 |
| 1 | 1 | "Ice Cream Money" | Steve Dildarian | Steve Dildarian | September 30, 2021 |
| 2 | 2 | "The Spelling Bee is Rigged" | Steve Dildarian | Steve Dildarian | September 30, 2021 |
| 2 | 2 | "Dakota's Dad" | Steve Dildarian | Steve Dildarian | September 30, 2021 |
| 3 | 3 | "A Yearbook to Disremember" | Steve Dildarian | Steve Dildarian | September 30, 2021 |
| 3 | 3 | "Trust Me, I'm a Nurse" | Steve Dildarian | Steve Dildarian | September 30, 2021 |
| 4 | 4 | "Tomz Lemonade" | Steve Dildarian | Steve Dildarian | September 30, 2021 |
| 4 | 4 | "A Tale of Two Lunch Ladies" | Steve Dildarian | Steve Dildarian | September 30, 2021 |
| 5 | 5 | "Tom Urinates on Boston" | Steve Dildarian | Steve Dildarian | September 30, 2021 |
| 5 | 5 | "First Responder" | Steve Dildarian | Robert Cohen | September 30, 2021 |
| 6 | 6 | "The Principal is Banging My Mom" | Steve Dildarian | Steve Dildarian | September 30, 2021 |
| 6 | 6 | "Elderly Gerbil" | Steve Dildarian | Karey Dornetto and Lauren Rantala | September 30, 2021 |
| 7 | 7 | "Skipping School" | Steve Dildarian | Steve Dildarian | September 30, 2021 |
| 7 | 7 | "Cooking the Books" | Steve Dildarian | Steve Dildarian | September 30, 2021 |
| 8 | 8 | "Roastmaster Tom" | Steve Dildarian | Steve Dildarian | September 30, 2021 |
| 8 | 8 | "A Daffodil for Terence" | Steve Dildarian | Steve Dildarian | September 30, 2021 |
| 9 | 9 | "Art Class" | Steve Dildarian | Steve Dildarian | September 30, 2021 |
| 9 | 9 | "Problem Moms" | Steve Dildarian | Steve Dildarian | September 30, 2021 |
| 10 | 10 | "Landscaper on the Couch" | Steve Dildarian | Steve Dildarian | September 30, 2021 |
| 10 | 10 | "Nurse's Wedding" | Steve Dildarian | Steve Dildarian | September 30, 2021 |

=== Season 2 (2023) ===
| No. overall | No. in season | Title | Directed by | Written by | Original release date |
|---|---|---|---|---|---|
| 11 | 1 | "The Henderson Consulting Squirrels" | Steve Dildarian | Steve Dildarian | June 29, 2023 |
| 11 | 1 | "Rick's Boat" | Steve Dildarian | Steve Dildarian | June 29, 2023 |
| 12 | 2 | "Tae Kwon Do" | Steve Dildarian | Steve Dildarian | June 29, 2023 |
| 12 | 2 | "Banned from Band" | Steve Dildarian | Nathan Min | June 29, 2023 |
| 13 | 3 | "Shopping Cart Hit and Run" | Steve Dildarian | Steve Dildarian | June 29, 2023 |
| 13 | 3 | "Filthy Tom" | Steve Dildarian | Conor Galvin | June 29, 2023 |
| 14 | 4 | "Crossing Guard" | Steve Dildarian | Steve Dildarian | June 29, 2023 |
| 14 | 4 | "Poker Game" | Steve Dildarian | Steve Dildarian | June 29, 2023 |
| 15 | 5 | "Bowling League" | Steve Dildarian | Steve Dildarian | June 29, 2023 |
| 15 | 5 | "I Want to Speak to the Manager" | Steve Dildarian | Steve Dildarian | June 29, 2023 |
| 16 | 6 | "Nelson's Hot Mom" | Steve Dildarian | Steve Dildarian | June 29, 2023 |
| 16 | 6 | "History Week" | Steve Dildarian | Byron Bowers | June 29, 2023 |
| 17 | 7 | "Tom Can't Stop Farting" | Steve Dildarian | Steve Dildarian | June 29, 2023 |
| 17 | 7 | "Uncle Bill's Resume" | Steve Dildarian | Steve Dildarian | June 29, 2023 |
| 18 | 8 | "Therapy Dog" | Steve Dildarian | Steve Dildarian | June 29, 2023 |
| 18 | 8 | "The Nurse's Baby" | Steve Dildarian | Steve Dildarian | June 29, 2023 |
| 19 | 9 | "Tom Tucks In His Shirt" | Steve Dildarian | Steve Dildarian | June 29, 2023 |
| 19 | 9 | "Bingo With Grandma" | Steve Dildarian | Owen Burke | June 29, 2023 |
| 20 | 10 | "Sweet Home Cancún" | Steve Dildarian | Steve Dildarian | June 29, 2023 |
| 20 | 10 | "Sweet Home Cancún, Part Two" | Steve Dildarian | Steve Dildarian | June 29, 2023 |
