= Fox Series =

Middle Eastern TV channel

Fox
- Final logo, used from October 2022 to March 2024
- Broadcast area: Middle East and North Africa

Programming
- Languages: English; Arabic

Ownership
- Owner: The Walt Disney Company EMEA (Disney Entertainment)

History
- Launched: 3 December 2008; 17 years ago
- Closed: March 2024; 2 years ago
- Replaced by: Star Series
- Former names: Fox Series (2008–2011)

Links
- Website: www.foxme.tv

Fox, formerly known as Fox Series, was a Middle Eastern version of the American Fox Channel. It launched as a free-to-air channel as Fox Series in 2008. The channel was relaunched as Star Series on March 1, 2024.

== Background ==
The channel began broadcasting as a Middle Eastern version of Fox. In 2008 the channel was renamed as Fox Series, and in 2011 was replaced by Middle Eastern version of Fox with the channel continuing to broadcast from cable and satellite. The channel began broadcasting in 2011 on-screen as simply Fox. On November 4, 2015, the channel started to broadcast exclusively in HD and became encrypted due to its move to satellite television provider beIN. On March 1, 2024, the Middle Eastern version of Fox was replaced by Star Series.
