= FX Life (Greece) =

Greek pay-television channel

- Country: Greece and Cyprus
- Headquarters: Athens

Programming
- Language: English (with Greek subtitles)
- Picture format: 16:9, 1080p (HDTV)

Ownership
- Owner: The Walt Disney Company Greece (Disney Entertainment)
- Sister channels: FX; National Geographic

History
- Launched: 1 December 2008
- Former names: Fox Life (2008-2023)

Links
- Website: www.fxchannel.gr

Final logo as Fox Life, from 2017 to 2023

FX Life (formerly known as Fox Life) is a Greek pay-television channel owned by the Fox Networks Group, which launched on 1 December 2008. The network also broadcasts to Cyprus, doing so since 15 October 2012.

The program includes foreign series such as Grey's Anatomy, This Is Us, and How to Get Away with Murder, with new episodes for the first time in Greece and some reality shows such as MasterChef and Project Runway.

On 15 March 2023, The Walt Disney Company had dropped the word Fox from the name of the channel and due to this, both Fox and Fox Life became FX and FX Life respectively in order to avoid confusion with Fox Corporation and to avoid having the Star trademark in Greece as another unaffiliated channel, Star Channel has owned the trademark.

== Programmes ==
=== Current ===
- Abbott Elementary
- Blue Bloods
- Castle
- Chicago Fire
- Chicago Med
- Good Trouble
- Grey's Anatomy
- How I Met Your Father
- How I Met Your Mother
- The King of Queens
- MasterChef
- Modern Family
- Not Dead Yet
- Station 19
- Top Chef

=== Former ===
- Alaska Daily
- Anthony Bourdain: No Reservations
- Backstrom
- Big Sky
- Body of Proof
- Brothers & Sisters
- Cougar Town
- Criminal Minds
- Day Break
- The Delicious Miss Dahl
- Desperate Housewives
- Devious Maids
- Dirt
- Dirty Sexy Money
- Donal's Super Food In Minutes
- Donna Hay - Fast, Fresh, Simple
- Don't Trust the B— in Apartment 23
- Eli Stone
- Ellen
- The Ex List
- Friends with Benefits
- The Gates
- Ghost Whisperer
- Girls
- Glee
- Happy Endings
- How to Get Away with Murder
- Jamie Oliver's Food Revolution
- Jamie Oliver: Together
- Jamie's One Pan Wonders
- Jamie's 30-Minute Meals
- Jane by Design
- Kevin Hill
- Kitchen Nightmares
- Last Man Standing
- Made in Hollywood
- Make It or Break It
- Melissa & Joey
- Mental
- Million Dollar Listing New York
- Mistresses
- The Muppets
- My Generation
- The Neighbors
- New Girl
- Nigella's Cook, Eat, Repeat Christmas Special
- Off The Map
- Once Upon a Time
- Pepper Dennis
- Private Practice
- Project Runway
- Project Runway All Stars
- The Rachel Zoe Project
- Raising Hope
- Raising The Bar
- Reboot
- Revenge
- Samantha Who?
- Scandal
- Scoundrels
- Scrubs
- Tabatha's Salon Takeover
- Tiny Beautiful Things
- Tough Love
- Transplant
- Ugly Betty
- Unprisoned
- What About Brian
- Witches of East End
- Who Do You Think You Are?
- Will & Grace
- Work of Art: The Next Great Artist

== See also ==
- FX
- FX Life
- National Geographic Greece
