= Fox (Hungarian TV channel) =

Hungarian TV channel

- Country: Hungary
- Broadcast area: Hungary, Romania
- Network: Fox Broadcasting Company
- Headquarters: London, UK; Sofia, Bulgaria

Programming
- Languages: Hungarian; English
- Picture format: 576i (SDTV); 720p (HDTV)

Ownership
- Owner: Fox Networks Group
- Sister channels: National Geographic Channel; NatGeo Wild; Baby TV

History
- Launched: 4 February 2014
- Closed: 30 April 2018 (4 years, 85 days)
- Replaced by: Fox+ (later discontinued and replaced by Disney+)

Links
- Website: www.foxtv.hu

Fox was a basic cable television channel broadcasting in Hungary, operated by Fox Networks Group and launched on 4 February 2014. It ceased operations on 30 April 2018.

== History ==
The launch of Fox in Hungary was announced in October 2013 together with Fox Life and Fox Crime. At the time sister channels National Geographic Channel, Nat Geo Wild, and Baby TV were available in Hungary, while Fox was available in several other territories including Austria, the UK, the U.S., Italy, Spain, Portugal, Japan, Germany, North Africa, and Latin America, Fox Life and Fox Crime also being available in territories like Bulgaria, Ukraine, and Croatia. Rodrigo Crespo was chosen as the official voice of the channel. The official YouTube channel of the Hungarian Fox was created in December 2013, while its Facebook page and official site were created in January 2014.

The channel was launched on 4 February 2014 exclusively on the digital platforms of Magyar Telekom, ten days before the Hungarian version of Paramount Channel. Its advertising airtime was sold by Atmedia from 1 March 2014.

On February 1, 2018, Fox announced to launch Fox+, a video on demand service for the Hungarian Fox.

Fox Hungary was shut down on 1 May 2018, After the channel showed a Fox+ Commercial, then played an ident, and froze. The channel ceased operations then.

Fox+ was eventually discontinued a few months before the launch of Disney+ in Hungary, with its content migrating towards the streaming service when it launched on June 14, 2022.

== Programs ==
=== Primetime ===
Series name	Hungarian title	Time slot	Season(s)
11.22.63	11/22/63	Tuesday nights	1
24: Live Another Day	24: Élj egy új napért	Thursday nights	1
American Crime Story	Amerikai Crime Story	Monday nights	1
The Bridge	A híd	Thursday nights	2
Boomtown	Boomtown	Monday nights	2
Bosch	Harry Bosch - A nyomozó	Wednesday nights	2
Charmed	Bűbájos boszorkák	Weekdays	8
Conviction	Az ítélet	Monday nights	1
The Crazy Ones	Eszementek	Weekdays	1
Crisis	Krízis	Wednesday nights	1
Da Vinci's Demons	Da Vinci démonai	Tuesday nights	3
Empire	Empire	Wednesday nights	3
Endgame	Végjáték	Thursday nights	1
Everybody Loves Raymond	Szeretünk Raymond	reruns	2
The Family	A család	Thursday	1
The Fixer	Az irányítók	Thursday nights	1
Friends with Better Lives	Barátaim jobb élete	Friday nights	1
Ghost Whisperer	Szellemekkel suttogó	Weekdays	4
Grey's Anatomy	A Grace klinika	Weekdays	4
How I Met Your Mother	Így jártam anyátokkal	Weekdays	9
Las Vegas	Las Vegas	Weekdays	5
Legends	Legends - Beépülve	Wednesday nights	2
The Listener	Hetedik érzék	Weekdays	5
Major Crimes	Major Crimes	Friday nights	6
Medium	A médium	Weekdays	7
Outcast	Outcast	Monday nights	1
Jungle Cubs	Dzsungel könyve	reruns	2
Private Eyes	Éber szemek	Friday nights	1
Queen of the South	Az alvilág királynője	Tuesday nights	1
Resurrection	Feltámadtak	Tuesday nights	2
The Simpsons	A Simpson család	Weekdays	9, 13–23, 25-29
Sleepy Hollow	Az Álmosvölgy legendája	Monday nights	3
The Strain	The Strain - A kór	Tuesday nights	2
Those Who Kill	A gyilkosnak ölni kell	Wednesday nights	1
The Walking Dead	The Walking Dead	Monday nights	8
Wayward Pines	Wayward Pines	Thursday nights	2
The Whispers	Suttogók	Monday nights	1

=== Reality show/Documentary ===
- Man Up
- Hook It Cook It
- Tales from the Bush Larder
- Top Tables, Top Cities
- The Wine Quest: Spain
- World's Best Chefs
