= FX (Italian TV channel) =

Defunct Italian television channel

- Country: Italy
- Broadcast area: Italy

Programming
- Language(s): Italian language
- Picture format: 576i (16:9 SDTV)

Ownership
- Owner: Fox International Channels Italy

History
- Launched: 21 May 2006; 19 years ago
- Closed: 1 July 2011; 14 years ago

Links
- Website: fx.foxtv.it

FX was an Italian TV channel, which launched on 21 May 2006 in Italy on Sky Italia.

It broadcast Italian and US movies and TV series. It also aired a selection of mystery-related documentaries after their passage on the National Geographic Channel, as well as some documentaries produced by the channel itself (e.g. Biancaneve, a report on the cocaine consumption in Central Europe).

Every weekend, the channel aired "Nocturama", a night-long marathon of top network TV series like Burn Notice and It's Always Sunny in Philadelphia.

Due to lowest ratings, the channel was closed on 1 July 2011, following a line-up restyling of Sky Italia.
