= FX (Indian TV channel) =

Indian television channel

- Country: India
- Broadcast area: South Asia
- Headquarters: Mumbai

Programming
- Language: English
- Picture format: 576i (SDTV); 1080i (HDTV)

Ownership
- Owner: Fox Networks Group; Star India

History
- Launched: 1 February 2007; 19 years ago
- Replaced: Star Sports First
- Closed: 15 June 2017; 9 years ago
- Former names: Star Dubai (2007-2010)

FX was an Indian affiliate of the American network entertainment TV channel, owned and produced by Fox International Channels and distributed by Star India.

== History ==
FX India (replaced Star Dubai) was launched on February 1, 2007, together with Fox Crime, BabyTV, National Geographic HD, Nat Geo Wild, National Geographic Adventure and National Geographic Music.

On June 30, 2010, Star Dubai will be changed and renamed as FX India.

The HD feed launched on 23 September 2015. The channel was closed down on 15 June 2017.

== Programming ==
- The Affair
- Alias
- The Americans
- BBQ Confessions
- Bikini Destinations
- Bosch
- Breaking Bad
- Californication
- Charlie Jade
- Community
- Crash
- Disorderly Conduct
- Doctor Who
- Empire
- Episodes
- Family Guy
- Frasier
- Free Radio
- Ghost Hunters International
- Harper's Island
- Homeland
- It's Always Sunny in Philadelphia
- JAG
- The Killing
- Last Comic Standing
- The Last Man on Earth
- The Listener
- Louie
- Luther
- MacGyver
- Mad Men
- Mental
- My Name Is Earl
- Nurse Jackie
- Peep Show
- Playmakers
- The Practice
- Prison Break
- Relic Hunter
- The Riches
- Saving Grace
- Seinfeld
- The Simpsons
- Son of the Beach
- Sons of Anarchy
- Spooks
- The Shield
- Testees
- Tilt
- Top Gear
- The West Wing
- World's Greatest Gambling Scams
- The X-Files

== See also ==
- FX (Asian TV channel)
- Nat Geo Wild
