= Star Channel (Flemish TV channel) =

- Country: Belgium
- Headquarters: Amsterdam, Netherlands

Programming
- Language: Dutch
- Picture format: 1080i HDTV (downscaled to 16:9 576i for the SDTV feed)

Ownership
- Owner: The Walt Disney Company (Benelux) BV (Disney Entertainment)
- Sister channels: National Geographic; National Geographic Wild

History
- Launched: 1 October 2015; 10 years ago
- Former names: Fox (2015–2023)

Links
- Website: www.starchannel.be

Final logo as Fox, used from 2019 to 2023

Star Channel (formerly known as Fox) is a Belgian Dutch-language pay television channel broadcast in Flanders and owned by The Walt Disney Company (Benelux) BV, a unit of the Disney Entertainment division of The Walt Disney Company. It was launched on 1 October 2015 and features programming from Fox and HBO. On 20 March 2019, Disney acquired Fox Networks Group's owner, 21st Century Fox. On 1 November 2023, the channel was rebranded to Star Channel.

== Programming ==
=== Current programming ===
- American Pickers
- Below Deck Adventure
- Below Deck Mediterranean
- Chucky
- Flip This House
- From
- Hot Yachts
- Hudson & Rex
- In the Dark
- Last Man Standing
- Laugh Out Loud
- Make You Laugh Out Loud
- The Millionaire Matchmaking
- NCIS: New Orleans
- The Real Housewives of New York City
- Resident Alien
- Shark Tank
- Station 19
- Storage Wars
- Transplant
- The Walking Dead
- Zombie House Flipping

=== Former programming ===
- 11.22.63
- 12 Monkeys
- 1864
- Ascension
- Atlanta
- Baby Daddy
- Best of Viral Videos
- Black-ish
- Blue Eyes
- The Book of Negroes
- The Border
- Chance
- Cheers
- Chicago P.D.
- Colony
- CSI: S3
- CSI: Miami
- CSI: NY
- Da Vinci's Demons
- De Dingen Des Levens
- De Streken Van Wim
- Deep State
- Detective Mclean
- Empire
- Episodes
- The Exorcist
- Falling Skies
- The Fall
- False Flag
- The Flash
- Gala Miss Belgie 2017
- Gangland Undercover
- Gilmore Girls
- The Hotel People
- Joan & Melissa: Joan Knows Best?
- Judge Judy
- Law & Order
- Legion
- Let's Go Viral
- Life with La Toya
- The Long Road Home
- Mars
- Meet the Russians
- The Millers
- Million Dollar Listing New York
- Million Dollar Listing Los Angeles
- The Mindy Project
- Mooi en Meedogenloos
- Nancy Drew
- Nashville
- Outcast
- Outsiders
- Push Girls
- Real Girlfriends in Paris
- The Real O'Neals
- Rosemary's Baby
- Rules of Engagement
- Six
- Sons of Liberty
- Storage Wars Canada
- Superstore
- Talking to the Dead
- Tyrant
- Ultimate Airport Dubai
- Veronique 16
- Victoria's Secret Fashion Show 2016
- Victoria's Secret Swim Special
- Wayward Pines
- Will & Grace
- The Young Pope
