= FX Comedy =

Polish TV channel

- Country: Poland

Programming
- Picture format: 1080i 16:9

Ownership
- Owner: Disney Entertainment
- Sister channels: FX

History
- Launched: January 1, 2007
- Former names: Fox Life (2007-2015); Fox Comedy (2015-2023)

Links
- Website: www.fxchannel.pl

FX Comedy (formerly known as Fox Comedy and Fox Life) is a Polish television channel owned by Disney Entertainment, a division of The Walt Disney Company.

== History ==
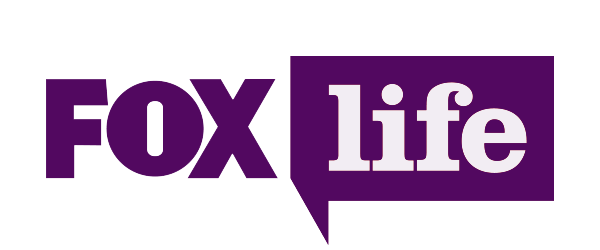
Final logo as Fox Life, used from 2013 to 2015

The station launched in Poland on 4 January 2007 as Fox Life. At the beginning, it was available only to Cyfrowy Polsat viewers, but it was later added to other cable operators in the country, like Toya. Fox Life aired both cult series as well as premieres of new series, mostly dedicated to women (Ugly Betty, Grey's Anatomy, Desperate Housewives). On 6 February 2010 Fox Life HD was launched. The channel changed its logo and graphics from October 2013.

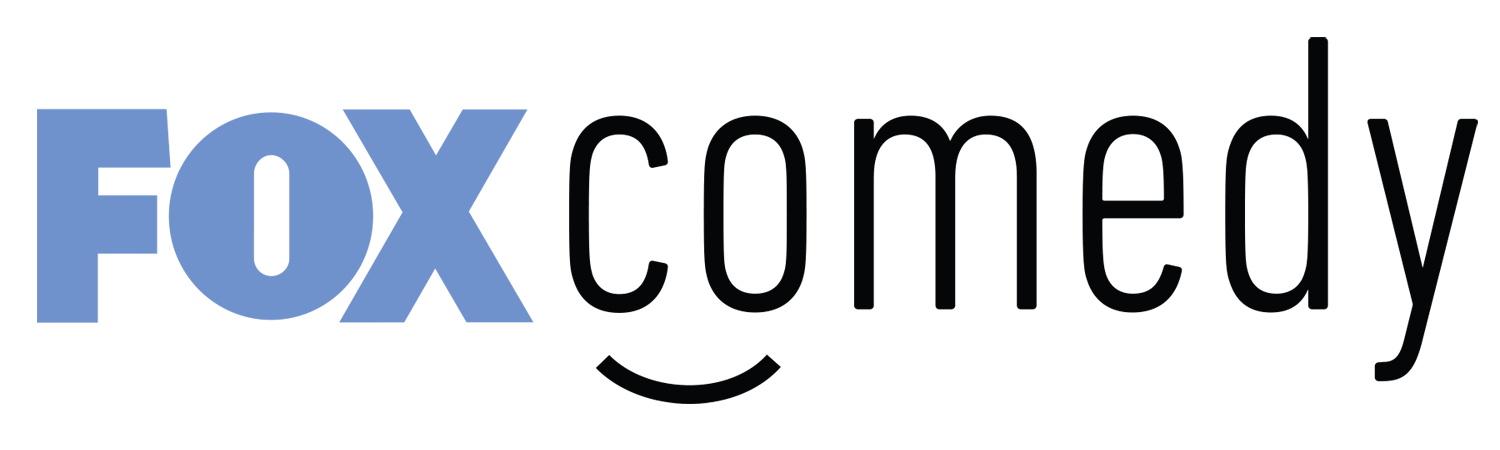
Final logo as Fox Comedy, used from 2015 to 2023

On 1 December 2014 it was announced that on 16 January 2015, due to its low viewership, Fox Life would be replaced by Fox Comedy and became a comedy channel. On 7 November 2023, Fox Comedy was rebranded as FX Comedy.

== Logos ==
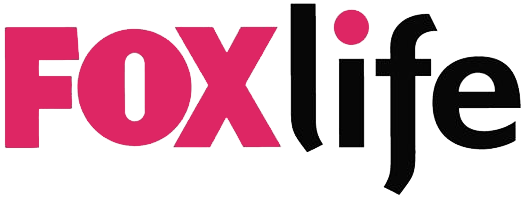
Fox Life logo (2007–2013)

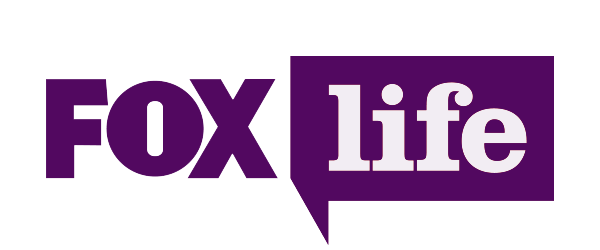
Fox Life logo (2013–2015)

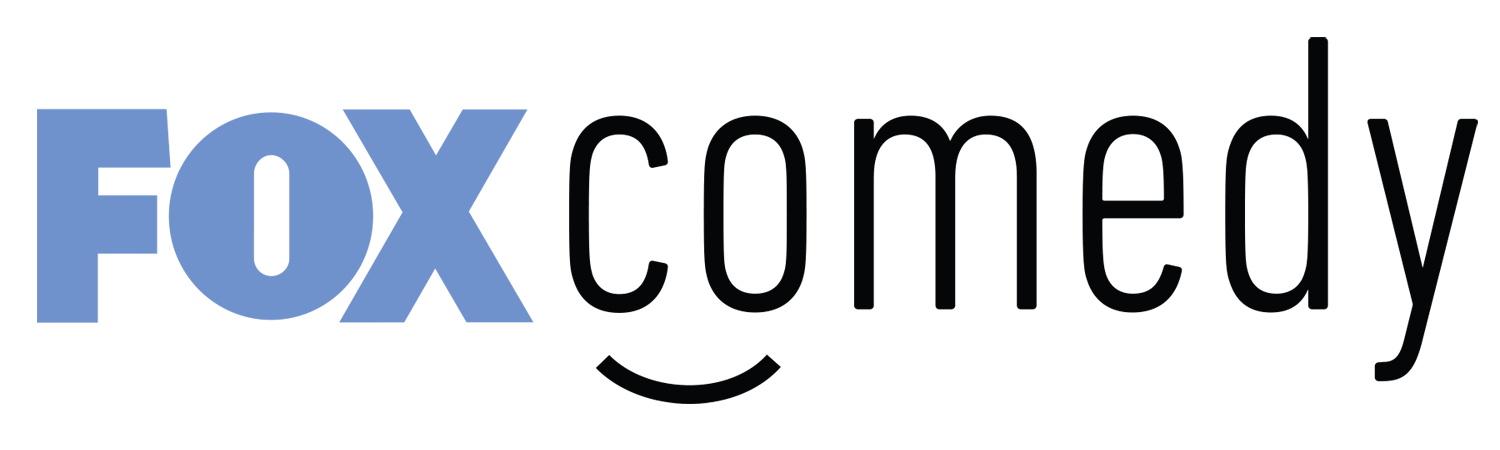
Fox Comedy logo (2015–2023)

FX Comedy logo (2023–present)

== Programming ==
=== Current programming ===
- According to Jim
- Everybody Loves Raymond
- Family Guy
- The Fresh Prince of Bel-Air
- How I Met Your Mother
- Melissa & Joey
- Modern Family (Note: Also aired on Fox Life Poland)
- My Wife and Kids
- Panda
- Rules of Engagement
- Ugly Betty

=== Former programming ===
==== As Fox Comedy ====
- 3rd Rock from the Sun
- American Dad!
- Archer
- Black-ish
- Bob's Burgers
- Brickleberry
- The Cleveland Show
- Community
- Cougar Town
- Desperate Housewives
- Don't Trust the B— in Apartment 23
- Friends with Benefits
- Futurama
- Ghosts
- Glee
- The Grinder
- HPI
- The IT Crowd
- King of the Hill
- The King of Queens
- Last Man Standing
- M*A*S*H
- The Mindy Project
- New Girl
- The Office
- Raising Hope
- Resident Alien
- Scream Queens
- Scrubs
- The Simpsons
- Sirens
- Speechless
- Shin-Chan
- That '70s Show
- Weeds
- What We Do in the Shadows
- Will & Grace

==== As Fox Life ====
- 90210
- Abbey & Janice
- Ally McBeal
- America's Next Top Model
- Army Wives
- Body of Proof
- Brothers and Sisters
- Bunheads
- Charmed
- Close Up
- Commander In Chief
- Coś tu się kroi
- Crossing Jordan
- Dark Angel
- Devious Maids
- Dirt
- Dirty Dancing UK
- Dirty Sexy Money
- Eli Stone
- Entourage
- ER
- Fashion House
- The Fashion Show
- Flashpoint
- Gay, Straight or Taken?
- Ghost Whisperer
- Grey's Anatomy
- Hart of Dixie
- Head Case
- Hidden Palms
- Hope & Faith
- Il vizio dell'amore
- Joe Millionaire
- Kevin Hill
- King
- Las Vegas
- Lie to me
- Mad Men
- Man Up!
- Miss Match
- Mistresses
- Private Practice
- Profiler
- Providence
- The Real Housewives of New Jersey
- Red Widow
- Russian Dolls: Sex Trade
- Samantha Who?
- Secret Diary of a Call Girl
- She Spies
- Six Feet Under
- The Simple Life
- So You Think You Can Dance
- Summerland
- Talk to Me
- Top Chef
- Top Model UK
- Tough Love
- Trophy Wife
- What About Brian
- Witches of East End
- Windfall
- The X Factor UK
- Zaginiona
