= Disney Jr. (Europe, Middle East and Africa) =

Preschool pay television channel

- New logo since 1 June 2024
- Country: United Kingdom
- Broadcast area: List: Baltic states; Bosnia and Herzegovina; Bulgaria; Croatia; Cyprus; Greece; Kosovo; Middle East & North Africa; Montenegro; North Macedonia; Poland; Romania; Serbia; Slovenia; Sub-Saharan Africa; Turkey
- Headquarters: 3 Queen Caroline Street, Hammersmith, West London W6 9PE, United Kingdom

Programming
- Languages: English; Arabic (dubbing/subtitles); Bulgarian (dubbing/subtitles); Greek (dubbing/subtitles); Polish (dubbing/subtitles); Romanian (dubbing/subtitles); Turkish (dubbing/subtitles); Albanian (subtitles; formerly); Croatian (dubbing/subtitles); Serbian (subtitles); Slovene (subtitles)
- Picture format: SDTV 576i (16:9); HDTV 1080i

Ownership
- Owner: The Walt Disney Company Limited (Disney Entertainment)
- Sister channels: Disney Channel Star World Star Movies

History
- Launched: 1 June 2011; 15 years ago; 1 March 2012; 14 years ago (Romania); 1 July 2015; 11 years ago (Hungary); 5 June 2023; 3 years ago (Nordics distribution)
- Closed: 5 December 2017; 8 years ago (Hungary); 1 April 2024; 2 years ago (Nordics distribution); 1 April 2026; 7 months ago (Spain)
- Former names: Jetix Play (2003–2010; Middle East and CEE only); Playhouse Disney (2010–2011); Disney Junior (2011–2024)

Links
- Website: English MENA schedule; Arabic MENA schedule; Sub-Saharan African schedule; Greek schedule; Polish schedule; Romanian schedule; Spanish schedule (archived); Turkish schedule

Availability

Terrestrial
- GOtv (Sub-Saharan Africa): Channel 82
- DStv (Sub-Saharan Africa): Channel 309

Disney Jr. (formerly known as Disney Junior), officially Disney Jr. Europe, Middle East and Africa (EMEA) is a British-managed preschool pay television channel targeting younger viewers aged 2–7, owned and operated by The Walt Disney Company Limited, the international division of The Walt Disney Company serving Central and Eastern Europe, the Middle East and Africa. Launched on 1 June 2011 as a replacement for Playhouse Disney outside Africa and headquartered at Hammersmith, West London, it broadcasts in 7 languages and in 4 languages only with subtitles.

It is available through Bulgaria, Greece, Cyprus, Poland, Romania, Turkey with Middle East countries, most of Africa, the Baltics, and the Balkan countries (including Albania).

There is also a separate Western European version, regrouping the French, Dutch-speaking Belgium, Portuguese, British and Italian feeds.

Disney Jr. is partially available in the Czech Republic through some satellite services, but does not air through its native language (Czech), unlike the former block on Disney Channel. It was previously available in Hungary between 2015 and 2017 in a Hungarian language track. Since May 2016, it added an Arabic language counterpart for the MENA transmission via OSN. Since April 2022, Disney Jr. is currently the only Disney-branded TV channel in Turkey since Disney Channel closed.

Disney Jr. programs are currently available on Disney+ which launched in South Africa on 18 May 2022, the Middle East and North Africa on 8 June; and Greece, Turkey, and Central and Eastern Europe on 14 June, concluding Europe's release.

== Availability ==
=== Current ===
==== France ====
Originally launched as Playhouse Disney on 2 November 2002, along with Disney Channel +1 and Toon Disney; later rebranded as Disney Junior on 28 May 2011 in both SD and HD. Available through France until January 1, 2025 and its overseas territories, Francophone Africa, Haiti, Luxembourg, Belgium, and Switzerland.

==== Europe, Middle East and Africa (EMEA) ====
A pan-regional feed available through Bulgaria, Greece, Cyprus, Poland, Romania, Turkey with the Middle East (except Iran, Israel, and Syria), most of Africa, the Baltics, and the Balkan countries. Launched on 1 June 2011, while 1 March 2012 in Romania. The Polish and Romanian transmissions airs local advertisements. The Hungarian version was initially available between 1 July 2015 to December 2017 with a Hungarian language audio track. Since 2016, it began broadcasting in Arabic. In the Czech Republic, it only aired with Czech subtitles. In Turkey, it is the only Disney-branded TV channel since April 2022.

==== Israel ====
Launched on 18 July 2011 on Yes satellite and on 27 November 2013 on HOT Cable, under The Walt Disney Company Israel. The programming is not synced with the other EMEA feeds.

==== Belgium ====
Launched on 10 September 2011, and available in Dutch.

==== Netherlands ====
Initially available between 10 September 2011 to 1 April 2019; relaunched on 1 May 2025, replacing Disney XD as a daytime timeshare with Veronica.

==== Portugal ====
The Portuguese version of the channel launched on 1 November 2012, replacing Disney Cinemagic. An HD version of the channel debuted in March 2021. It is also available in Angola and Mozambique via Zap and DStv packages.

==== UK and Ireland ====
It was the first Disney Junior to launch in the EMEA; originally launched as Playhouse Disney on 29 September 2000. Later rebranded as Disney Junior on 7 May 2011. It ceased broadcasting on all platforms on 1 October 2020 along with sister channels Disney Channel and Disney XD with programs moving to Disney+. However, the channel was relaunched on November 13, 2025 just 5 years after the original iteration closed down.

==== Italy ====
Launched on 14 May 2011 replacing Playhouse Disney and closed on 1 May 2020 along with Disney Channel, with select programming moving to Disney+. The channel was relaunched on December 1, 2025.

=== Defunct ===
==== Hungary ====
The Hungarian feed was launched on July 1, 2015, but shut down in December 5, 2017 due to lack of distributing for most of the Hungarian pay TV providers. It would plan to cease on October 12, but moved instead to December 5, discontinuing the Hungarian language audio track.

==== Germany ====
It was available across Germany, Austria and Switzerland between 14 July 2011 to 30 September 2021. Programs continue to air every morning on Disney Channel.

==== Scandinavia ====
Launched on 10 September 2011, available through Nordic countries. Broadcasting in Danish, Norwegian, Finnish, Russian and Swedish languages; airing local advertisements. The channel closed on Allente on 28 February 2023, with the availability on satellite remains unknown.

The channel ceased transmission in Denmark on 1 March 2024.

On 1 April 2024, in other Scandinavian countries, its selected programs moved to Disney Channel on the same day with its programs airing during mornings and at weekends.

==== Spain ====
Disney Junior launched on 11 June 2011, replacing Playhouse Disney (which was launched on 16 November 2001) with a Spanish language track. It was also available in Andorra. On October 31, 2025, a Disney Jr. branded block launched on Clan, running twice every day. The channel was closed on April 1, 2026 and was replaced by a relaunch of Disney Channel. The brand continues as a morning programming block following the channel's closure.

== See also ==
- Disney Channel (Europe, Middle East and Africa)
- Disney Jr.
