= FX (Polish TV channel) =

Polish TV channel

FX (Poland)
- Country: Poland

Programming
- Picture format: 1080i 16:9

Ownership
- Owner: The Walt Disney Company Poland (Disney Entertainment)
- Sister channels: FX Comedy

History
- Launched: November 6, 2010; 16 years ago
- Former names: Fox (2010–2023)

Links
- Website: www.fxchannel.pl

FX (formerly known as Fox) is a Polish television channel of the American cable network counterpart, which broadcasts mainly American series produced by 20th Television (formerly known as 20th Century Fox Television).

== History ==
Final logo as Fox, used from 2019 to 2023

The channel was launched as Fox on November 6, 2010 at 20:00. Since that day, it has been available in two DTH platforms: n and Cyfrowy Polsat. SD version of the channel was launched in January 2011 and is available in cable television companies and since February 2011, also in Polsat Box. The channel's accessibility is being expanded.

On 7 November 2023, Fox was rebranded to FX, Instead of The Star network from the Disney plus hub.

== Programming ==
=== Current series ===
- Alert: Missing Persons Unit
- Bones
- Criminal Minds
- CSI: Vegas
- CSI: Miami
- CSI: NY
- House M.D.
- HPI
- The Irrational
- Lucifer
- Mercato
- NCIS
- Quantum Leap

=== Former series ===
- American Horror Story
- Archer
- Bob's Burgers
- The Booth at the End
- Breaking Bad
- Breakout Kings
- The Cape
- The Chicago Code
- The Cleveland Show
- Community
- Desperate Housewives
- Defying Gravity
- Dollhouse
- Do Not Disturb
- The Equalizer
- Family Guy
- The Finder
- Friends with Benefits
- The Glades
- Glee
- The Good Guys
- Heroes
- Homeland
- The Hot Zone
- Kdabra
- Last Man Standing
- The League
- Life
- The Life & Times of Tim
- Life on Mars
- Lights Out
- The Listener
- Living in Your Car
- Louie
- Mad Men
- The Mentalist
- Morderczynie
- Modern Family
- NCIS: Hawaiʻi
- Neighbors From Hell
- No Ordinary Family
- Once Upon a Time
- Only Murders in the Building
- Perception
- Persons Unknown
- Prison Break
- Raising Hope
- Roswell
- Shark
- The Simpsons
- Sons of Anarchy
- Sons of Tucson
- Terra Nova
- Terriers
- This Is Not My Life
- Tiempo final
- Touch
- Traffic Light
- Unsupervised
- The Walking Dead
- Weeds
- White Collar
- Wilfred
- Will Trent
- The X-Files
