= Star Channel (Finnish TV channel) =

Finnish TV channel

- Country: Finland
- Broadcast area: Finland; Åland

Programming
- Languages: Finnish; English (with Finnish subtitles)
- Picture format: 16:9 HDTV

Ownership
- Owner: The Walt Disney Company Nordic AB, filial i Finland (Disney Entertainment)
- Sister channels: Star Channel HD

History
- Launched: 18 December 2009
- Former names: SuomiTV (until 15 April 2012); Fox (Until 6 January 2023)

Links
- Website: www.starchannel.fi

Availability

Terrestrial
- Digital terrestrial: Channel 12

Final logo as Fox, used from 2019 to 2023

Star Channel (formerly SuomiTV and later Fox) is a Finnish entertainment TV channel owned and operated by The Walt Disney Company through its local subsidiary The Walt Disney Company Nordic AB, filial i Finland (formerly Family Channel Oy, Fox International Channels Oy and Fox Networks Group Oy). The channel was acquired by FNG Nordic (then known as FIC Nordic) in January 2012, and then relaunched as its current incarnation on 16 April that year.

Star Channel is freely available in Finland both over-the-air and through cable, as it bases its funding on television advertisements. It is FNG Nordic's first channel that does not operate on subscriber fees.

As the channel was licensed as generalist channel, it was required to broadcast certain television programmes. As of 2018, Fox fulfilled such requirements by simulcasting Sky News (which was a fellow 21st Century Fox business until November 2018) overnight, and showing programmes aimed at children in mornings under Fox Kids programming block. Such requirements were lifted in 2017.

== History ==
FNG announced in early 2012 that it took over SuomiTV's license in order to convert it into a local Fox channel. Fox Networks Group Oy also operates the Finnish version of National Geographic television channel.

The channel provided a free catch up service through its online platform FOXplay until 2019.

Effective 1 January 2019, Sanoma Media Finland took over media sales representation of Fox Networks Group channels in Finland, which includes this channel.

On October 26, 2022, The Walt Disney Company Nordic & Baltic announced that Fox would be renamed as Star Channel on 6 January 2023.

== Past programming ==
=== News ===
SuomiTV had its own news department, but it was later phased out.

Until 2019, Fox simulcast Sky News overnight.

=== Fox Kids ===
This is the only outlet to revive the Fox Kids name, which was phased out most of the world. Initially, it utilised the Fox Kids' global logo and on-screen branding from early 2000s, but it was later replaced by another logo and look. After Disney's acquisition of 21st Century Fox, Fox Kids is managed by Disney Channels Worldwide.

The block started its services on 17 September 2012 in line with the channel's expansion into the morning. Its inclusion owed to a legal requirement as part of its general service license in order to keep the channel available on terrestrial television. In 2013, the block was successful, managing 31% share among children, still behind market leader Yle TV2 at 37%. By 2015, it experienced a content shift, starting to lean more towards girls.

The block offered foreign television programs aimed at a young audience dubbed into the Finnish language. The block ended on 6 January 2019.
