= FX (Greek TV channel) =

- Country: Greece
- Broadcast area: Greece, Cyprus
- Headquarters: Athens

Programming
- Language: English (with Greek subtitles)
- Picture format: 1080i HDTV

Ownership
- Owner: The Walt Disney Company Greece (Disney Entertainment)
- Sister channels: FX Life, National Geographic

History
- Launched: 30 November 2009
- Former names: Fox (2012-2023)

Links
- Website: www.fxchannel.gr

FX (formerly known as Fox) is a Greek pay television channel owned by the Fox Networks Group, that was launched on 30 November 2009. The channel is broadcast in Cyprus too, with the same schedule to Greece.

The programm lineup includes sci-fi series such as The X-Files and Battlestar Galactica, reality shows such as The Amazing Race animation such as The Simpsons and Family Guy, other series such as Law & Order and The Walking Dead, with new episodes for the first time in Greece and also new recent series such as Terra Nova and The Killing for the first time in Greece.

Final logo as Fox, used from 2019 to 2023

On 1 October 2012, FX was relaunched as Fox with a new program lineup. Most of the following series, are broadcasting from Fox.

On 15 March 2023, The Walt Disney Company announced that Fox and Fox Life in the country would return to the FX brand. The international Star name used by Disney in other territories to replace Fox is already in use in Greece by the unrelated Star Channel.

== Programming ==
=== Current ===
- 9-1-1
- 9-1-1: Lone Star
- Bones
- Brooklyn Nine-Nine
- Criminal Minds (Note: Also present on FX Greece's first incarnation)
- Doctor Odyssey
- The Goldbergs
- The Office US
- The Simpsons
- Solar Opposites
- Tracker
- Under the Banner of Heaven
- White Collar

=== Former ===
==== As Fox ====
- 24
- According to Jim
- Agents of S.H.I.E.L.D.
- The Amazing Race
- American Crime Story
- American Horror Story
- The Americans
- Arrested Development
- A Teacher
- Atlanta
- Awake
- The Bastard Executioner
- Beauty & the Beast
- Breakout Kings
- Brickleberry
- The Bridge
- Bob's Burgers
- Burn Notice
- Chance
- Chicago P.D.
- The Cleveland Show
- Cosmos: A Spacetime Odyssey
- Crisis
- Dads
- Da Vinci's Demons
- Deep State
- Elementary
- Empire
- Enlisted
- Episodes
- Falling Skies
- Family Guy
- False Flag
- Feud
- The Finder
- Friends
- Gang Related
- Ghosted
- The Gifted
- The Glades
- Godfather of Harlem
- Graceland
- Homeland
- The Hour
- How I Met Your Mother
- Jo
- The Killing
- The League
- Legion
- Legit
- Lie to Me
- Mad About You
- Marvel's Agent Carter
- Marvel's Inhumans
- Mrs. America
- NCIS: Los Angeles
- NCIS: New Orleans
- Outcast
- The Passage
- Prison Break
- Rules of Engagement
- Saint X
- Scream Queens
- Sleepy Hollow
- Snowfall
- Sons of Anarchy
- The Strain
- Suits
- Tales of the Walking Dead
- Terra Nova
- That '70s Show
- Touch
- Traffic Light
- True Lies
- Trust
- Tyrant
- Unsupervised
- The Walking Dead
- War of the Worlds
- Wayward Pines
- Wilfred
- Will Trent
- The X-Files

==== As FX (first incarnation) ====
- Around the World for Free
- Battlestar Galactica (miniseries)
- Battlestar Galactica (TV series)
- The Buried Life
- Bridget Marquardt
- Call Me Fitz
- Camelot
- Caprica
- The Chicago Code
- Crash
- Criminal Minds: Suspect Behavior
- Day Break
- Detroit 1-8-7
- Dhani Tackles the Globe
- Dinner: Impossible
- Dollhouse
- FlashForward
- The Goode Family
- The Good Guys
- Happy Town
- I Can't Believe I'm Still Single
- It's Always Sunny in Philadelphia
- Jesse James Is a Dead Man
- Law & Order
- Legend of the Seeker
- The Life & Times of Tim
- Life on Mars
- Lights Out
- Line of Fire
- Living in Your Car
- Long Way Round
- Lost
- Manswers
- Neighbors from Hell
- No Ordinary Family
- Persons Unknown
- Shaq Vs.
- Stargate Universe
- Terriers
- Tiempo final
- Touch
