= Fox Sports =

American brand of television programming

- Product type: Trademark
- Current owner: Fox Corporation (United States, Canada and Mexico); Foxtel (Australia); The Walt Disney Company (Latin America, except Mexico and Argentina); Mediapro (Argentina)
- Produced by: Rupert Murdoch
- Country: United States
- Introduced: August 12, 1994; 32 years ago
- Related brands: Fox Sports United States; Fox Sports Argentina; Fox Sports Australia
- Markets: Worldwide
- Previous owners: News Corporation; 21st Century Fox
- Website: foxsports.com

Fox Sports is the brand name for a number of sports channels, broadcast divisions, programming, and other media around the world. The name originates from Fox Broadcasting Company in the United States, which in turn derives its name from Fox Film (which merged with Twentieth Century Pictures to form 20th Century Fox in 1935), named after founder William Fox.

The Fox Sports name has since been used for other sports media assets. These assets are held mainly by Fox Corporation, with the exceptions of the operations in Australia (which are part of Foxtel, entirely owned by DAZN as of April 2025), Mexico (owned by Grupo Multimedia Lauman), Argentina (owned by Mediapro but branding and contents are licensed to Fox Corporation), and the rest of Fox Sports International that was sold to the Walt Disney Company in Latin America, except Mexico and Argentina.

== Divisions ==
- Fox Sports (United States), also known as the Fox Sports Media Group.
  - FoxSports.com, a sports news website.
  - Fox Sports Radio is a national sports talk radio network managed by Premiere Networks in partnership with Fox Sports.
- Fox Sports Australia, formerly Premier Media Group, owned by Foxtel (A DAZN Company).
- Fox Sports Argentina, owned by Mediapro, branding licensed from Fox Corporation

== Channels ==
=== Current channels ===
==== Australia ====
- Fox Sports (Australia), a group of sports channels
  - Fox Sports News 500 – Cable and satellite channel that continuously televises sports news 24 hours per day.
  - Fox Cricket 501 – A 24-hour dedicated Cricket channel
  - Fox League 502 – A 24-hour dedicated Rugby League channel
  - Fox Sports 503
  - Fox Footy 504 – A 24-hour dedicated Australian Football League channel
  - Fox Sports 505
  - Fox Sports 506
  - Fox Sports More+ 507

==== Argentina ====
- Fox Sports (Argentina), is an Argentine pay television network that broadcasts in Argentina.
  - Fox Sports: formerly known as Prime Deportiva and Fox Sports Américas.
  - Fox Sports 2: formerly known as Fox Sports+
  - Fox Sports 3: formerly known as Speed Channel, it was launched in 2012 and its programming is car-related.

==== Canada ====
- Fox Sports Racing: Formerly known as the Speed Channel, it was launched in 2013 and primarily simulcasts motorsports content mostly from Fox Sports 1 and Fox Sports 2

==== United States ====
- Fox Sports 1 is a national sports network.
- Fox Sports 2 is a national sports network.
- Fox Deportes presents sports programming in Spanish.
- Fox Soccer Plus, Originally a spin-off of Fox Soccer, with extended coverage of soccer and other international sport events.

=== Former channels ===
==== Africa ====
- Fox Sports Africa, launched in August 2014 in Sub-Saharan Africa.

==== Asia ====
- Fox Sports, was a group of sports channels available in East and Southeast Asia, formerly ESPN Star Sports. These channels were closed on October 1, 2021.
  - Fox Sports, formerly ESPN.
  - Fox Sports 2, formerly Star Sports.
  - Fox Sports 3, formerly ESPN HD and Fox Sports Plus HD.

==== Brazil ====
- Fox Sports Brazil, It was the Brazilian division of Fox Sports, that included 2 channels aimed at broadcasting sporting events 24 hours a day. Its main channel was rebranded on January 17, 2022, as ESPN4:
  - Fox Sports: since February 5, 2012, the channel was already available in all Brazil. On January 17, 2022, Fox Sports was renamed ESPN 4.
  - Fox Sports 2: launched on January 24, 2014. Now run by Disney; remained under that name, due to contractual language with CONMEBOL regarding its coverage of the 2022 Copa Libertadores. On 15 February 2024, Fox Sports 2 was renamed ESPN 5.

==== Canada ====
- Fox Sports World Canada, a defunct specialty channel primarily featuring soccer and other events around the world that operated from 2001 to 2012.

==== Latin America ====
- Fox Sports, was a group of channels broadcast across Mexico, Central, and South America. Its main channel was rebranded on December 1, 2021, as ESPN4:
  - Fox Sports: formerly known as Prime Deportiva and Fox Sports Américas. On 1 December 2021, Fox Sports was renamed ESPN 4.
  - Fox Sports 1 (Chile): formerly known as Fox Sports Premium. On 15 February 2024, Fox Sports 1 was renamed ESPN Premium.
  - Fox Sports 2: formerly known as Fox Sports+. On 15 February 2024, Fox Sports 2 was renamed ESPN 7.
  - Fox Sports 3 (not available in Brazil): formerly known as Speed Channel, it was launched in 2012. On 15 February 2024, Fox Sports 3 was renamed ESPN 6.
  - Fox Sports Premium (Argentina): A pay-TV channel launched in 2017, it specialises in broadcasting Argentine First Football Division matches. On May 1, 2022, the channel was renamed ESPN Premium.

==== Mexico ====
- Fox Sports (Mexico), is a Mexican pay television network that broadcasts in Mexico.
  - Fox Sports: formerly known as Prime Deportiva and Fox Sports Américas.
  - Fox Sports 2: formerly known as Fox Sports+
  - Fox Sports 3: formerly known as Speed Channel, it was launched in 2012 and its programming is car-related.
  - Fox Sports Premium, is a pay-TV channel launched in 2022, it is specialised in broadcasting Mexican First Football Division matches.

==== Middle East ====
- Fox Sports Middle East was a sports channel that was distributed by Star Select as part of package television channels.

==== Netherlands ====
- Fox Sports (Netherlands) was a group of sports channels owned by Eredivisie Media & Marketing which for 51% was owned by Fox Networks Group Benelux, the channels was rebranded as ESPN.
  - Fox Sports Eredivisie, 3 premium channels. It held the exclusive rights for the live matches of the Eredivisie, the highest Dutch football division.
  - Fox Sports International (Netherlands), 3 premium channels covered several European football leagues.

==== Israel ====
- Fox Sports Israel was first broadcast in Israel back in 2001 by satellite provider yes and since 2010 it broadcasts the HD version of the channel.

==== Italy ====
- Fox Sports Italy was an Italian sports channel launched in 2013 alongside Fox Sports Plus and Fox Sports 2, which carries soccer, MLB, NFL, NCAA Sports, Volley Champions League and Euroleague Basketball. In 2018, the channel has been dissolved.

==== Turkey ====
- Fox Sports Turkey was a sports channel that was distributed by the Turkish provider Digiturk.

==== South Korea ====
- JTBC3 Fox Sports, a sports channel was owned by joint owned by Fox Networks Group Asia Pacific and JTBC.

==== Japan ====
- Fox Sports & Entertainment began producing sports shows in 2013, which are broadcast in several Fox channels. The channel closed on March 31, 2020.

==== United States ====
- Fox College Sports was a suite of three region-specific networks devoted to college sports that were sold to Diamond Sports Group in 2019.
- Fox Soccer
- Fox Sports Networks was a collection of cable TV regional sports networks broadcasting across the United States that was sold to Diamond Sports Group in 2019. In 2021, these networks were relaunched under the Bally Sports branding. These channels include:
  - Fox Sports Arizona
  - Fox Sports Carolinas
  - Fox Sports Detroit
  - Fox Sports Florida
  - Fox Sports Indiana
  - Fox Sports Kansas City
  - Fox Sports Midwest
  - Fox Sports New Orleans
  - Fox Sports North
  - Fox Sports Ohio
  - Fox Sports Oklahoma
  - Fox Sports San Diego
  - Fox Sports South
  - Fox Sports Southeast
  - Fox Sports Southwest
  - Fox Sports Sun
  - Fox Sports Tennessee
  - Fox Sports West
  - Fox Sports Wisconsin
  - Fox Sports Northwest
  - Fox Sports Pittsburgh
  - Fox Sports Rocky Mountain
  - Fox Sports Utah
  - Prime Ticket
  - SportsTime Ohio
  - YES Network

== See also ==
- Fox Sports (United States)
- Fox Sports International
- Sky Sports
