= Magdalena Grant =

Chilean journalist (born 1987)

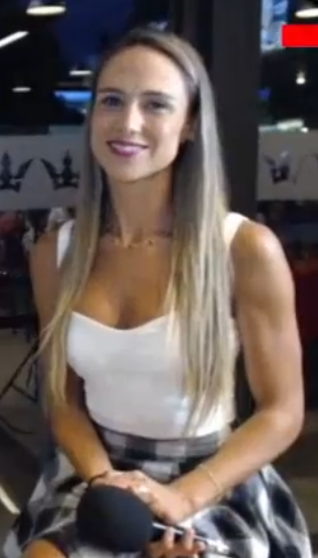
- Grant in 2018
- Born: March 13, 1987 (age 39); Santiago, Chile
- Other name: Mane Grant
- Education: Universidad Diego Portales
- Occupation: Journalist
- Years active: 2010-present
- Employer: ESPN Chile

Magdalena Susana Grant Yupanqui (born March 13, 1987), also known as Mane Grant, is a Chilean journalist, known for being the first host of the Chilean version of the sports news program Central Fox Chile on Fox Sports Chile. She has also worked as a panelist on the ESPN Chile program Nexo ESPN.

== Career ==
A graduate and licensed journalist from Diego Portales University, her first job in the media was in 2010, when she did her internship in the sports area of Televisión Nacional de Chile, where she was responsible, among other things, for covering the 2010 FIFA World Cup in South Africa.

A year later she joined Canal del Fútbol, where she worked as a reporter and hosted the program Rank, which reviewed archival footage of the best moments in Chilean football. She quickly became a regular on the channel and became its main female face. She soon became the main anchor of CDF Noticias, the channel's flagship newscast.

After more than three years at Canal del Fútbol, in July 2014 she changed television networks, joining the newly launched sports channel Fox Sports Chile, taking over as host of the news program Central Fox Chile alongside former player, now sports commentator Rodrigo Goldberg.

In January 2015, she was one of the journalists in charge of covering the 2015 Dakar Rally for all of Latin America through the Fox Sports channel. She took over from Alina Moine.

In August 2016, she was surprisingly fired from Fox Sports Chile along with another colleague for promoting a competitor's product on social media. She then co-hosted the program Buen Vivir on Radio FM Tiempo with Vanesa Borghi and Sebastián Keitel, co-hosted the program Cracks on the Vía X channel with Ivan Guerrero. She was also ESPN's correspondent in Russia for the Confederations Cup.

Since 2018 she has been a panelist and reporter on the Nexo ESPN program on ESPN Chile and on the Cónclave Deportivo program on Radio La Clave. For Chilevisión she covered the 2018 Copa América Femenina. In 2025, she joined DirecTV Chile. She works as a reporter for DSports.

== Personal life ==
Grant played volleyball for ten years. She does spinning and boxing in her free time. She says she supports meritocracy rather than feminism.

== Television ==
Year	Program	Role	Channel
2011	Rank	Host	Canal del Fútbol
2012-2014	CDF Noticias	Host	Canal del Fútbol
2014-2015	Central Fox Chile	Host	Fox Sports Chile
2015	Rally Dakar 2015	Host	Fox Sports
2016	Fox Sports Radio	Panelist	Fox Sports Chile
2016	Nunca es Tarde	Host	Fox Sports Chile
2016	Malas Compañías	Panelist	Canal Vive
2017	Copa Confederaciones	Correspondent	ESPN Chile
2017	Cracks	Host	Vía X
2017	Deportes TVN	Panelist	TVN
2018-2019	ESPN Nexo	Panelist	ESPN Chile

== Radio ==
Year	Program	Role	Radio
2016	Cónclave Deportivo	Panelist	Radio La Clave
2017	Buen Vivir	Host	FM Tiempo
2018-2019	Cónclave Deportivo	Panelist	Radio La Clave
