= Dlife (2012–2020) =

Japanese television channel (2012–2020)

- Country: Japan
- Broadcast area: Japan
- Headquarters: Tokyo, Japan

Programming
- Languages: Japanese (dubbing; main); English (via SAP) (subtitles in Japanese)
- Picture format: HDTV 1080i; SDTV 480i

Ownership
- Owner: The Walt Disney Company (Japan) Ltd.
- Sister channels: Disney Channel; Disney Jr.

History
- Launched: 17 March 2012; 14 years ago
- Closed: 31 March 2020; 6 years ago

Links
- Website: dlife.disney.co.jp/ (archived February 2020)

Dlife (ディーライフ, Dīraifu) was a Japanese free-to-view satellite channel owned and operated by The Walt Disney Company Japan, through its subsidiary Broadcast Satellite Disney. The channel was carried on BS (broadcasting satellite) channel 258, which was also used for cable companies that retransmitted the signal.

International dramas and movies, lifestyle programming and a selection of Disney productions made up the bulk of the schedule. The channel closed on 31 March 2020 when Disney withdrew from the free BS market. The brand would end up being recycled in 2024 as a rename of the Japanese feed of Fox.

== History ==
Walt Disney Japan submitted a bid to the Ministry of Internal Affairs and Communications in June 2010, when the regulator asked for tenders for new free-to-air satellite channels using the BS system. For this end, it created Broadcast Satellite Disney.

With the license, work on Dlife began in earnest in January 2012; a pre-launch campaign began the following month; to this end they appointed Chemistry to compose an image song for the channel, Dreamy Life. The channel launched on 17 March 2012. A one-week catch-up service opened on GyaO! on 24 June, providing it with episodes of ABC series.

The channel started 2013 with a marathon called Drama All Night, which featured a preview of Harry's Law. On 14 October 2013 (Sports Day), it held a similar, six-hour event, Drama de Autumn Night, fronted by Tetsuya Bessho. The first three days of 2014 featured 72 Hour Non-Stop TV, with previews of seven series and entire runs of seasons of some of its shows.

The channel aired its first sports show, Crossover, on 10 February 2019. After the channel's closure, it moved to BS Fuji.

In September 2019, Disney, which had acquired most 21st Century Fox assets, on 14 November 2019, Disney announced that Dlife and Fox Sports & Entertainment, the latter being a comparable channel Fox had before the merger. The channel closure was set for 31 March 2020 at 24:00 (UTC+09:00). Its closure received criticism from Twitter users. The final program seen was an all-day marathon of Criminal Minds season 11.

Disney recycled the brand for a rename of Fox Japan on 1 March 2024, on pay television.
