= Fox Sports International =

International outlets of Fox Sports

- Logo used from 2012 until 2024
- Product type: Television networks
- Produced by: Rupert Murdoch
- Country: United States
- Introduced: 1995; 31 years ago
- Discontinued: 15 February 2024; 2 years ago
- Markets: Africa; Asia; Argentina; Brazil; Canada; Latin America; Middle East; Mexico; Netherlands; Israel; Italy; Turkey; South Korea; Japan
- Previous owners: News Corporation; 21st Century Fox; The Walt Disney Company

Fox Sports International (FSI) was an international sportscasting and production division of Fox Networks Group, the television networks division of News Corporation and later 21st Century Fox that was active from 1995 to 15 February 2024.

After the latter was acquired by the Walt Disney Company on 20 March 2019, FSI began closing and selling various channels to third party owners due its ownership of ESPN.

== Channels ==
=== Africa ===
- Fox Sports Africa, launched in August 2014 in Sub-Saharan Africa.

=== Asia ===
- Fox Sports Asia, was a group of sports channels available in East and Southeast Asia, formerly ESPN Star Sports.
  - Fox Sports, formerly ESPN.
  - Fox Sports 2, formerly Star Sports.
  - Fox Sports 3, formerly ESPN HD and Fox Sports Plus HD.

=== Argentina ===
- Fox Sports Argentina, was an Argentine pay television network that broadcast in Argentina.
  - Fox Sports: formerly known as Prime Deportiva and Fox Sports Américas.
  - Fox Sports 2: formerly known as Fox Sports+
  - Fox Sports 3: formerly known as Speed Channel, it was launched in 2012 and its programming was car-related.
  - Fox Sports Premium: A pay-TV channel launched in 2017, it specialises in broadcasting Argentine First Football Division matches. On May 1, 2022, the channel was renamed ESPN Premium.

=== Brazil ===
- Fox Sports Brazil, It was the Brazilian division of Fox Sports, that included 2 channels aimed at broadcasting sporting events 24 hours a day.
  - Fox Sports: since February 5, 2012 the channel was already available in all Brazil. On January 17, 2022, Fox Sports was renamed ESPN 4.
  - Fox Sports 2: launched on January 24, 2014. On February 15, 2024, Fox Sports 2 was renamed ESPN 5.

=== Canada ===
- Fox Sports World Canada, a defunct specialty channel primarily featuring soccer and other events around the world that operated from 2001 to 2012.

=== Latin America ===
- Fox Sports Latin America, was a group of channels broadcast across Central, and South America.
  - Fox Sports: formerly known as Prime Deportiva and Fox Sports Américas. On 1 December 2021, Fox Sports was renamed ESPN 4.
  - Fox Sports 1 (Chile): formerly known as Fox Sports Premium. On 15 February 2024, Fox Sports 1 was renamed ESPN Premium.
  - Fox Sports 2: formerly known as Fox Sports+. On 15 February 2024, Fox Sports 2 was renamed ESPN 7.
  - Fox Sports 3: formerly known as Speed Channel, it was launched in 2012. On 15 February 2024, Fox Sports 3 was renamed ESPN 6.

=== Middle East ===
Fox Sports MENA
- Broadcast area: Middle East and North Africa
- Network: STAR TV Arabia; Fox Sports International
- Headquarters: London, United Kingdom

Programming
- Language: Arabic

Ownership
- Owner: News Corporation; Fox Networks Group

History
- Launched: 15 February 1997 (as ESPN STAR Sports Arabia)
- Closed: 1 May 2015
- Replaced by: beIN Sports
- Former names: ESPN STAR Sports Arabia (1997–98)

The Middle Eastern and North African channel feed of Fox Sports was launched in 1997 as ESPN STAR Sports Arabia and took its latest name as Fox Sports on 16 January the following year and then to Fox Sports Middle East on 1 April 1999. It was available as a part of the STAR Select package of television channels.

=== Mexico ===
- Fox Sports Mexico, is a Mexican pay television network that broadcasts in Mexico.
  - Fox Sports: formerly known as Prime Deportiva and Fox Sports Américas.
  - Fox Sports 2: formerly known as Fox Sports+
  - Fox Sports 3: formerly known as Speed Channel, it was launched in 2012 and its programming was car-related.

=== Netherlands ===
- Fox Sports Netherlands was a group of sports channels owned by Eredivisie Media & Marketing which for 51% was owned by Fox Networks Group Benelux, the channels was rebranded as ESPN.
  - Fox Sports Eredivisie, 3 premium channels. It held the exclusive rights for the live matches of the Eredivisie, the highest Dutch football division.
  - Fox Sports International (Netherlands), 3 premium channels covered several European football leagues.

=== Israel ===
- Fox Sports Israel was first broadcast in Israel back in 2001 by satellite provider yes and since 2010 it broadcasts the HD version of the channel.

=== Italy ===
- Fox Sports Italy was an Italian sports channel launched in 2013 alongside Fox Sports Plus and Fox Sports 2, which carries soccer, MLB, NFL, NCAA Sports, Volley Champions League and Euroleague Basketball.

=== Turkey ===
- Fox Sports Turkey was a sports channel that was distributed by the Turkish provider Digiturk.

=== South Korea ===
- JTBC3 Fox Sports, a sports channel was owned by joint owned by Fox Networks Group Asia Pacific and JTBC.

=== Japan ===
- in 2011 Fox sports was relaunch replacing by Fox life Fox Sports & Entertainment began producing sports shows in 2013, which were broadcast in several Fox channels.

== Fox Sports around the world ==
Channel	Country or region	Formerly	Launch year	Replacement / rebrand	Shutdown year
Fox Sports (Latin America)	Latin America	Speed (Fox Sports 3)	October 31, 1995 (Fox Sports) October 12, 2009 (Fox Sports 2) November 5, 2012 (Fox Sports 3)	ESPN 4 (Fox Sports) ESPN 7 and 6 (Fox Sports 2 and 3)	December 1, 2021 (Fox Sports) February 15, 2024 (Fox Sports 2 and 3)
Fox Sports (Brazil)	Brazil	Speed (Fox Sports)	February 5, 2012	ESPN 4 (Fox Sports) ESPN 5 (Fox Sports 2)	January 17, 2022 (Fox Sports) February 15, 2024 (Fox Sports 2)
Fox Sports (Japan)	Japan	Fox Life	October 1, 2011	discontinued	March 31, 2020
Fox Sports (Italy)	Italy	-	August 9, 2013 (Fox Sports) December 20, 2013 (Fox Sports 2)	discontinued	June 29, 2015 (Fox Sports 2) July 1, 2018 (Fox Sports)
JTBC Fox Sports (South Korea)	South Korea	-	August 1, 2015	JTBC Sports	March 10, 2020
Fox Sports (Turkey)	Turkey, Cyprus, Greece and Malta	-	April 10, 2007	discontinued	March 1, 2020
Fox Sports (Asia)	Southeast Asia and Hong Kong	ESPN Asia (Fox Sports) Star Sports (Fox Sports 2) Fox Sports Plus HD (Fox Sports 3)	January 28, 2013 (Fox Sports) August 15, 2014 (Fox Sports 2 and 3)	Astro Super Sport (Malaysia) Premier Sports (Philippines) SKTV Sports 4 (Vietnam) SPOTV (Southeast Asia and Hong Kong)	October 1, 2021
Fox Sports (Africa)	Africa	Setanta Sports Africa	August 2014	ESPN	August 30, 2019
Fox Sports (Middle East)	Middle East	ESPN Star Sports Arabia Melody Sports	April 1, 1999March 1, 2019	beIN Sports	May 1, 2015
Fox Sports (Taiwan)	Taiwan	ESPN Asia (Fox Sports) Star Sports (Fox Sports 2) Fox Sports Plus HD (Fox Sports 3)	January 28, 2013 (Fox Sports) August 15, 2014 (Fox Sports 2 and 3)	discontinued	January 1, 2021
Fox Sports (Netherlands)	Netherlands	Eredise Live	August 1, 2013	ESPN (Netherlands)	January 1, 2021
Fox Sports (Canada)	Canada	-	September 7, 2001	Sportsnet World	May 1, 2012
Fox Sports (Israel)	Israel	-	August 11, 2000	discontinued	March 1, 2020
Fox Sports (Argentina)	Argentina	Speed (Fox Sports 3)	October 31, 1995 (Fox Sports) October 12, 2009 (Fox Sports 2) November 5, 2012 (Fox Sports 3)	-	-
Fox Sports (Mexico)	Mexico	Speed (Fox Sports 3)	October 31, 1995 (Fox Sports) October 12, 2009 (Fox Sports 2) November 5, 2012 (Fox Sports 3)	-	-
