= Fox Sports (Latin America) =

Latin American sports cable television program

- Country: United States
- Broadcast area: Central America; South America; Caribbean
- Network: Fox Sports International
- Headquarters: Los Angeles, California, United States

Programming
- Language: Spanish
- Picture format: HDTV 1080i (downscaled to 480i/576i for the SD feed)

Ownership
- Owner: Liberty Media (1995); News Corporation (1995–2012); 21st Century Fox (2013–2019); The Walt Disney Company (2019–2024)

History
- Launched: Fox Sports: 31 October 1995; Fox Sports 2: 12 October 2009; Fox Sports 3: 5 November 2012
- Replaced: Speed (Fox Sports 3)
- Closed: Fox Sports: 1 December 2021; 4 years ago Fox Sports 2: 14 June 2023; 3 years ago (Central America and Dominican Republic); 15 February 2024; 2 years ago (South America); Fox Sports 3: 15 February 2024; 2 years ago
- Replaced by: ESPN 4 (Fox Sports); ESPN 7 (Fox Sports 2); ESPN 6 (Fox Sports 3)
- Former names: Prime Deportiva (1995–1996); Fox Sports Americas (1996–1999)

Fox Sports was a group of sports television channels available in Latin America. Several years after acquiring 20th Century Fox in 2019, the Walt Disney Company announced its decision to unify its sports broadcasting operations in Latin America exclusively under the ESPN brand. As a result, all Fox Sports channels were rebranded as ESPN by February 2024.

== History ==
Fox Sports logo, used from 2001 to 2009.

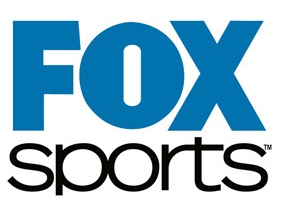
Fox Sports logo, used from 2009 to 2012.

The network was launched in 1996 as Prime Deportiva, under the ownership of Liberty Media. Prior to its launch, on October 31, 1995, News Corporation acquired a 50% ownership interest in Liberty's Prime Network group and its international networks (including sister channels Premier Sports and Prime Sports Asia) as part of an expansion of its Fox Sports properties in the Americas. In 1996, the channel was rebranded as Fox Sports Américas, later shortened to Fox Sports in 1999. In 2002, Hicks, Muse, Tate and Furst, a Dallas private equity firm, Liberty Media Corp and News Corp created a holding company (Fox Pan American Sports) to jointly operate FOX Sports Latin America. News Corp owned approximately 38% interest. Liberty later exited leaving HMTF and News Corp as co-owners of the cable network. News Corp purchased the ownership rights from HMTF of FOX Sports en Espanol and rebranded as FOX Deportes in 2010. News Corp purchased the remaining ownership rights for the holding company from HMTF and fully owned the FOX Sports Latin America cable network in 2011.

Fox Sports logo, used from February to November 2012.

In 2009, a second feed called Fox Sports+ (FOX Sports mas) was launched, to allow simultaneous broadcasting of football. In 2010, FOX Sports signed a deal with UFC to be the first cable network to show it in Latin America. FOX Sports also opened a studio in 2010 in Mexico City where it broadcasts original programming and licensed programming. In 2012, the channel was renamed to Fox Sports 2, whereas Speed Channel was rebranded to Fox Sports 3.

In March 2019, the network became a subsidiary of The Walt Disney Company after it acquired 21st Century Fox.

In December 2019, it was announced that its Chilean, Peruvian, Uruguayan and Colombian channels would go off the air.

In November 2021, Disney announced that Fox Sports' main channel would be renamed ESPN 4 on December 1, 2021, and it was also announced that on May 1, 2022, Fox Sports Premium would rebrand to ESPN Premium, while Fox Sports 2 and Fox Sports 3 would continue on the air, with the premium channel (Fox Sports 1) in Chile continuing on the air as well.

On May 17, 2023, It was announced that Fox Sports' secondary channel would close in Central America and Dominican Republic on June 14, 2023, with the South feed continue to being kept on air.

In November 2023, Disney announced that on Fox Sports 2 and Fox Sports 3 would reorganize on February 15, 2024 and rebrand to ESPN 6 and ESPN 7, while in Chile, the premium channel would rebrand to ESPN Premium.

== Feeds ==
=== Fox Sports ===
- North feed: available in Central America and Dominican Republic
- Chilean feed: available in Chile
- South feed: available in Bolivia, Colombia, Ecuador, Paraguay, Peru, Uruguay and Venezuela

=== Fox Sports 2 ===
- North feed: available in Central America and Dominican Republic
- South feed: available in South America

=== Fox Sports 3 ===
- Panregional feed: available in Central America, Dominican Republic and South America

=== Localised channels ===
- Fox Sports (Chile) — localized feed exclusively available for Chile, replacing Fox Sports in November 2013.
- Fox Sports 1 (Chile) — formerly known as Fox Sports Premium, it was launched at the same time as its sister channel. It covered pay-TV events from Fox Sports and Fox Sports 2 that couldn't be aired live on the localized feed due to broadcast licenses.
- Fox Sports (Colombia) — localized channel launched in 2016 as an independent feed with original programming.
- Fox Sports (Peru) - localised channel launched on 1 March 2018, with exclusive voice-over narrations for matches involving Peruvian football clubs and the Peruvian football team.
- Fox Sports (Uruguay) - localised channel launched in February 2014 with original programming and voice-over narrations for Uruguayan football teams.

== Programming ==
Fox Sports Latin America broadcast sports-related programming 24 hours a day in Spanish. The network carried a wide variety of sports events, including football (UEFA Champions League, Copa Lib, etc.), MLB and WWE programming. Fox Sports also aired talk shows (NET: Nunca es tarde) as well as other programming including exercise programs.

=== Sports programming ===
==== Football ====
- Copa Libertadores
- Copa Sudamericana
- UEFA Champions League
- UEFA Supercup
- Bundesliga
- DFL-Supercup

==== Motorsport ====
- Formula One
- World Rally Championship
- Dakar Rally
- Monster Energy NASCAR Cup Series
- NASCAR Xfinity Series
- NASCAR Camping World Truck Series
- NASCAR Toyota Series
- DTM
- IMSA WeatherTech SportsCar Championship
- FIA World Endurance Championship
- World Touring Car Championship
- Superbike World Championship

==== Other sports ====
- Major League Baseball
- National Football League
- Bellator MMA
- Glory
- Ultimate Fighting Championship (Except PPV main card)
- WWE (Raw, SmackDown, Main Event, NXT and Vintage)

=== Other programming ===
Alongside its live sports broadcasts, Fox Sports also aired a variety of sports highlight, talk, and documentary styled shows. These include:

==== North feed ====
- Central Fox
- Cara a Cara
- La Previa del fin de Semana
- Impacto NFL
- Fox Sports Punto Extra
- Polémica Fox Sports
- Tribuna Fox Sports
- Auto Show TV
- Fox Gol
- La Hora de Cuauhtemoc Blanco
- La Historia de los Mundiales
- Mobil 1: The Grid
- Crítica 12
- Lo Mejor de lo Fox Sports
- Feria de Goles
- Fox para Todos
- Expediente Fútbol
- Auto Show TV
- Gillette World Sport
- Full Tilt Póker
- Volvo Ocean Race
- El Show de las Copas
- Lo Mejor de la UEFA Champions League
- El Show de la NFL en Fox Sports
- El Show de la Copa Libertadores
- El Show de la UEFA Champions League
- La Última Palabra
- Fox Sports Review

==== South feed ====
- Central Fox
- Minuto Cero
- Última Vuelta
- La Última Palabra
- 90 Minutos de Fútbol
- El Show de la Fórmula 1
- Fox Sports Radio (Peru, Colombia, Chile and Uruguay)
- Expediente Fútbol
- Máxima Velocidad
- 5ta a Fondo
- Stop and Go
- Invierno Fox Sports
- Atlas, la Otra Pasión
- Fox Sports Clásico
- EuroGol
- Car News TV
- Nunca es Tarde
- Rally On Board
- Circuito Fox Sports
- Más Motor
- Recta Principal
- Motociclismo Extremo
- Show Red Bull
- World Touring Car Championship: Inside WTCC
- La Última Palabra
- Car and Travel
- Pasión Xtrema
- Fox Sports Show
- Futsal AFA
- Fox Gol Colombia
- Sín Anestesia
- PokerStars.net
- Full Tilt Poker
- El Show de las Copas
- El Show de la UEFA Champions League
- X-perience Tour
- Arena mix
- De Gira
- Fox Fit

== Personalities ==
=== North feed ===
- (Ecuador) Álex Aguinaga
- (Mexico) Alberto Lati
- (Mexico) Alberto "Beto" Rojas
- (Mexico) Alejandro "Alex" Blanco
- (Mexico) Alejandro Correa
- (Mexico) Antonio Valls
- (Mexico) Brenda Alvarado
- (Colombia) Carlos Cabrera
- (Mexico) Carlos Hermosillo
- (Mexico) Carlos Moreno
- (Mexico) Carlos Rodrigo Hernández
- (Mexico) Carlos Rosado
- (Mexico) Carlos Sequeyro
- (Mexico) Carlos Velasco
- (Mexico) David Espinosa
- (Mexico) Diego Venegas
- (Mexico) Eddy Vilard
- (Mexico) Eduardo Sainz
- (Mexico) Eduardo de la Torre
- (Mexico) (United States) Ernesto del Valle
- (Mexico) Enrique Gómez
- (Mexico) Emilio León
- (Chile) Fabián Estay
- (Mexico) Fernando Bastién
- (Mexico) Fernando Cevallos
- (Mexico) Fernando Schwartz
- (Mexico) Fernando Von Rossum de la Vega
- (Mexico) Gabriel Medina Espinosa
- (Mexico) Gerardo Higareda
- (Mexico) Guillermo Salas
- (Mexico) Gustavo Mendoza
- (Mexico) Iris Cisneros
- (Mexico) Jerry Soto
- (Mexico) Jimena Sánchez
- (Mexico) Jonathan Magaña
- (Mexico) José Pablo Coello
- (Mexico) Juan Carlos Casco
- (Mexico) Lorena Troncoso
- (Mexico) Luis Díaz Chapulín
- (Mexico) Luis Hipólito
- (Mexico) Luis Manuel Chacho López
- (Mexico) Luis Ramírez
- (Mexico) Luis Rodríguez
- (Honduras) Luis Mario Sauret
- (Venezuela) Marcelo Rodríguez
- (Venezuela) (Mexico) María del Valle
- (Mexico) Marlon Gerson
- (Mexico) Mónica Arredondo
- (Mexico) Natalia León
- (Mexico) Oscar Guzmán
- (Mexico) Paulina Chavira
- (Mexico) Rafael Márquez Lugo
- (Mexico) Raoul Ortíz
- (Mexico) Raúl Orvañanos
- (Panama) Ricardo García Ochoa
- (Mexico) Ricardo Pato Galindo
- (Mexico) Rubén Rodríguez
- (Mexico) Salim Chartouni
- (Argentina) Santiago Fourcade
- (Mexico) Santiago Puente
- (Mexico) Sergio Treviño
- (Mexico) (United States) Tony Rivera
- (Mexico) Ulises Herbert

=== South feed ===
- (Argentina) Mariano Closs
- (Argentina) Diego Latorre
- (Argentina) Juan Manuel Pons
- (Argentina) Gustavo Cima
- (Argentina) Sebastián Vignolo
- (Argentina) Oscar Ruggeri
- (Argentina) Ariel Helueni
- (Argentina) Aldo Proietto
- (Argentina) Marcelo Benedetto
- (Argentina) Juan José Buscalia
- (Argentina) Gustavo López
- (Argentina) Germán Paoloski
- (Argentina) Raúl Cascini
- (Argentina) Pablo Bari
- (Argentina) Diego Fucks
- (Argentina) Damián Manusovich
- (Argentina) Marcelo Sottile El Cholo
- (Argentina) Carlos Aimar
- (Argentina) Fernando Tornello
- (Argentina) Adrián Puente
- (Argentina) Emiliano Pinsón
- (Argentina) Ariel Donatucci
- (Argentina) Martín Liberman
- (Argentina) Sergio Goycochea
- (Argentina) Roberto Trotta
- (Argentina) Walter Safarián
- (Argentina) Pablo Schillaci
- (Argentina) Javier Tabares
- (Argentina) Máximo Palma
- (Argentina) Raúl Taquini
- (Argentina) Emiliano Cándido
- (Argentina) Walter Queijeiro
- (Argentina) Chiche Ferro
- (Argentina) Claudio Frino
- (Argentina) Guillermo Salatino
- (Argentina) Alina Moine
- (Argentina) Matías "Chiquito" García
- (Argentina) Emiliano Raggi
- (Argentina) Silvio Maverino
- (Argentina) Julián Fernández
- (Argentina) Fabián Turnes Chino
- (Argentina) Juan Manuel Fernández
- (Argentina) Agostina Scalise
- (Argentina) Alejandro Parmo
- (Argentina) Alejo Mazotti
- (Argentina) Alejo Rivera
- (Argentina) Martín Coggi
- (Argentina) Mauro Palacios
- (Argentina) Jerónimo Bidegain
- (Argentina) Mariana Lamas
- (Argentina) Claudio Freire Clarfe
- (Argentina) Damián Trillini
- (Argentina) Leandro Alves
- (Argentina) Luciana Rubinska
- (Argentina) Federico Sánchez Ficha
- (Argentina) Pablo Sincini
- (Argentina) Federico Bueno
- (Argentina) Roberto Leto
- (Argentina) Jorge Baravalle
- (Argentina) Sergio Rek
- (Argentina) Federico Bulos
- (Argentina) Tomás Fricher
- (Argentina) Lucas Aberastury
- (Argentina) Mauricio Gallardo
- (Argentina) Eduardo Ruiz
- (Argentina) Juan Carlos Pellegrini
- (Argentina) Raúl Barceló
- (Argentina) Sebastián Porto
- (Argentina) Sergio Gendler
- (Argentina) Esteban Guerrieri
- (Argentina) Matías Traversa
- (Argentina) Pablo Borsutzky
- (Argentina) Juan Gutiérrez
- (Argentina) Renato Della Paolera
- (Argentina) Juan Fossaroli
- (Argentina) (Chile) Lucila Vit
- (Chile) Fernando Solabarrieta
- (Chile) Dante Poli
- (Chile) Rodrigo Goldberg
- (Chile) Felipe Horta
- (Colombia) José Amado
- (Colombia) Óscar Córdoba
- (Colombia) Víctor Hugo Aristizábal
- (Colombia) Darío Ángel Rodríguez
- (Colombia) Alejandro Pino
- (Colombia) Hernán Peláez
- (Colombia) Rafael Sanabria
- (Colombia) Lizet Durán
- (Colombia) Carlos Roberto Cruz
- (Colombia) Daniel Angulo
- (Colombia) Diego Fernando Mejía
- (Peru) (Argentina) Daniel Retamoso
- (Peru) Mathías Brivio
- (Peru) Julio César Uribe
- (Peru) Eddie Fleischman
- (Peru) José Guillermo del Solar
- (Peru) Flavio Maestri
- (Peru) Peter Arevalo
- (Peru) Mauricio Loret de Mola
- (Peru) Romina Lozano
- (Peru) Alan Diez
- (Uruguay) Julio Ríos
- (Uruguay) Edward Piñón
- (Uruguay) Marcelo Tejera
- (Uruguay) Jorge Da Silveira
- (Uruguay) Fabián Carini
- (Uruguay) Rodolfo Larrea

== See also ==
- Fox Sports (Argentina)
- Fox Sports (Brazil)
- Fox Sports (Mexico)
- GOL TV
- ESPN Latin America
- TyC Sports
- TUDN
- DSports
- Claro Sports
