= Sergio Vargas (disambiguation) =

Sergio Vargas (born 1960) is a Dominican merengue musician

Sergio Vargas may also refer to:

- Sergio Vargas (footballer, born 1965), Chilean football manager and former goalkeeper
- Sergio Vargas (footballer, born 1980), Chilean football defensive midfielder
