= Fox Sports (Uruguay) =

- Country: Uruguay
- Broadcast area: Uruguay
- Network: Fox Sports
- Headquarters: Montevideo, Uruguay

Programming
- Language: Spanish
- Picture format: 1080i (HDTV) (downgraded to 16:9 480i for the SDTV)

Ownership
- Owner: The Walt Disney Company Latin America; Fox Networks Group (Walt Disney Direct-to-Consumer and International)

History
- Launched: February 2, 2014
- Closed: December 9, 2019

Links
- Website: http://www.foxsports.com.uy/

Fox Sports was a Uruguayan pay television channel specialised in broadcasting sports events. The localised feed was launched on 2 February 2014. The channel used the studios, mobiles and technical equipment of Channel 4 of Montevideo.

In December 2019, it was announced that Fox Sports Uruguay would close after five years due to the acquisition of 21st Century Fox by Disney.

== Programming rights ==
Events and competitions that were seen on Fox Sports Uruguay.

=== Latin American Football ===
TV Canales En vivo Gratis

=== American Football ===
- National Football League

=== Australian Rules Football ===
- Australian Football League

=== Football ===
- Copa Libertadores
- UEFA Champions League
- UEFA Europa League
- European Supercup
- Bundesliga
- DFL-Supercup
- FIFA Club World Cup
- Torneos de Verano
- Argentine Primera División

=== Motorsports ===
- Dakar Rally
- Formula One

== See also ==
- Fox Sports International
- Fox Sports Latin America
