= Emanuel Vargas =

Argentine-born Chilean footballer (born 1988)

Personal information
- Full name: Emanuel Sebastián Vargas Torus
- Date of birth: 13 February 1988 (age 38)
- Place of birth: Buenos Aires, Argentina
- Height: 1.86 m (6 ft 1 in)
- Position: Goalkeeper

Youth career
- Universidad de Chile

Senior career*
Years	Team	Apps	(Gls)
2007–2009	Universidad de Chile	0	(0)
2008	→ Iberia (loan)	27	(0)
2009	→ Lota Schwager (loan)	9	(0)
2010	Jugendland	32	(0)
2011–2012	Cobresal	19	(0)
2013	Deportes Iquique	2	(0)
2013–2014	Rangers	3	(0)
2014–2015	Lota Schwager	8	(0)
2015–2018	Iberia	5	(0)
Total		105	(0)
- * Club domestic league appearances and goals

Emanuel Sebastián Vargas Torus (born 13 February 1988) is an Argentine-born Chilean former footballer who played as a goalkeeper.

== Career ==
In 2005, Vargas took part of the reality TV show Adidas Selection Team from Fox Sports Chile, where a squad made up by youth players from professional teams faced players from schools, standing out future professional footballers such as Felipe Seymour, Nelson Saavedra, Eduardo Vargas, among others.

In February 2015, he was released from Lota Schwager after having a fight with his fellow Sergio Núñez.

His last club was Iberia.

== Personal life ==
He is the son of Sergio Vargas, a former Chile national team goalkeeper. In addition, his sister, Nadia, is married to the former Chile international midfielder Manuel Iturra.

== Honours ==
=== Club ===
Universidad de Chile

- Primera División de Chile (1): 2009 Apertura
