= Fox Sports (Argentina) =

Cable television network

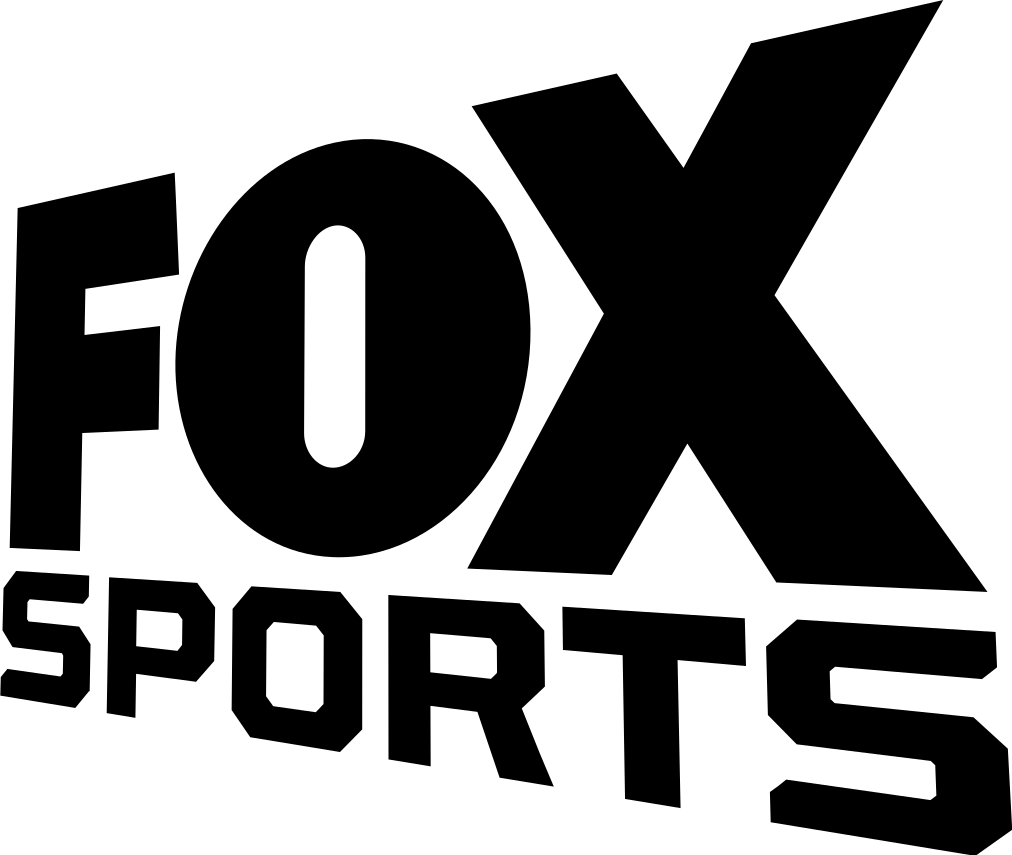
- Country: Argentina
- Headquarters: Munro, Buenos Aires, Argentina

Programming
- Language: Spanish
- Picture format: HDTV 1080i (downscaled to 480i/576i for the SD feed)

Ownership
- Owner: Mediapro (branding licensed from Fox Sports Media Group)

History
- Launched: Fox Sports: 31 October 1995; Fox Sports 2: 12 October 2009; Fox Sports 3: 5 November 2012
- Replaced: Speed (Fox Sports 3)
- Closed: January 31, 2027
- Former names: Prime Deportiva (1995–1996); Fox Sports Americas (1996–1999)

Links
- Website: www.foxsports.com.ar

Fox Sports is a group of channels available in Argentina and operated by Mediapro. The network is focused on sports-related programming including live and pre-recorded event broadcasts, sports talk shows and original programming, available throughout Argentina. The network is based in Argentina. The channel's name and various programs are licensed from Fox Sports Media Group, a subsidiary of Fox Corporation.

== History ==
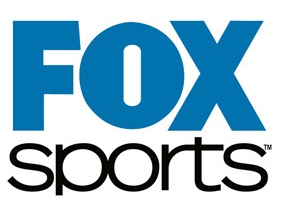
Fox Sports logo, used from 2009 to 2012.

The network was launched in 1996 as Prime Deportiva, under the ownership of Liberty Media. Prior to its launch, on October 31, 1995, News Corporation acquired a 50% ownership interest in Liberty's Prime Network group and its international networks (including sister channels Premier Sports and Prime Sports Asia) as part of an expansion of its Fox Sports properties in the Americas. In 1996, the channel was rebranded as Fox Sports Américas, later shortened to Fox Sports in 1999. In 2002, Hicks, Muse, Tate and Furst, a Dallas private equity firm, Liberty Media Corp and News Corp created a holding company (Fox Pan American Sports) to jointly operate FOX Sports Latin America. News Corp owned approximately 38% interest. Liberty later exited leaving HMTF and News Corp as co-owners of the cable network. News Corp purchased the ownership rights from HMTF of FOX Sports en Espanol and rebranded as FOX Deportes in 2010. News Corp purchased the remaining ownership rights for the holding company from HMTF and fully owned the FOX Sports Latin America cable network in 2011.

Fox Sports logo, used from February to November 2012.

In 2009, a second feed called Fox Sports+ (FOX Sports mas) was launched, to allow simultaneous broadcasting of football. In 2010, FOX Sports signed a deal with UFC to be the first cable network to show it in Latin America. FOX Sports also opened a studio in 2010 in Mexico City where it broadcasts original programming and licensed programming. In 2012, the channel was renamed to Fox Sports 2, whereas Speed Channel was rebranded to Fox Sports 3.

On August 21, 2017, Fox launched a new channel called Fox Sports Premium that broadcast the replays of the matches of the Argentine Primera División until August 25, 2017, when the Superliga Argentina began an agreement with TNT Sports to share the directives of Argentine football.

Fox Sports logo, used from November 2012 to August 2022.

On October 16, 2020, the Argentine Football Association would breach their television contract to broadcast Argentinian football on Fox Sports due to the Disney acquisition of 21st Century Fox, with TNT Sports being the only broadcasters leaving open the possibility that the Televisión Pública of reacquiring the rights. However, on October 30 the Argentinian court would rule in favor of Fox, with Fox being able to broadcast the matches.

On January 29, 2021, Disney would reach in agreement with Argentine Football Association to broadcast Argentine Primeira Division matches until 2030 with its sister channel ESPN to also broadcast outside of Argentina with Televisión Pública broadcasting matches in Argentina.

Fox Sports logo, used from August 2022 to February 2023.

In November 2021, Disney announced that Fox Sports' main channel would be renamed ESPN 4 except in Argentina on December 1, 2021. Fox Sports 2, Fox Sports 3 and Fox Sports Premium would continue on the air in Argentina.

On January 20, 2022, CNDC ordered Disney to divest the Fox Sports television network from the 21st Century Fox purchase in order to get an approval from the government of Argentina.

On February 15, 2022, Disney announced it would sell Fox Sports Argentina to Mediapro. The sale was approved by the CNDC on April 27, 2022.

It was announced that on May 1, 2022, Fox Sports Premium would rebrand to ESPN Premium.

On October 4, 2022, it was reported that Mediapro and Fox Deportes signed an licensing agreement to use channels brand name and produce programming for the channel.

On February 6, 2023, a new Fox Sports began with Mediapro and in this new stage the sports signal will have a renewed graphic identity, a new journalistic team and segmented programming with its own live programs, where Fox Sports will be dedicated mainly to the most traditional sports for the Argentine public, Fox Sports 2 to less popular disciplines. Fox Sports 3 would acquire a closer orientation to young people, with e-Sports competitions, streaming and culture of social networks.

On January 31, 2027, Fox Sports will close in Argentina due to the expiration of its licensing from Fox Corporation.

== Programming ==
Fox Sports Argentina broadcasts sports-related programming 24 hours a day in Spanish. The network carries a wide variety of sports events, including football (Copa Libertadores, UEFA Champions League etc.), and WWE programming. Fox Sports also airs talk shows (La Vuelta) as well as other programming including exercise programs.

=== Sports programming ===
==== Football ====
- Copa Libertadores
- Copa Sudamericana
- UEFA Champions League
- UEFA Super Cup
- Belgian First Division A
- Campeonato Brasileiro Série A
- Scottish Premiership
- Süper Lig
- English Football League

==== Motorsports ====
- Formula One
- Porsche Cup
- Rally Argentino

==== Basketball ====
- Liga ACB
- Copa del Rey
- Supercopa de España
- BIG3

==== Tennis ====
- Córdoba Open
- Hopman Cup
- Boodles Challenge

==== Combat sports ====
- Ultimate Fighting Championship (except PPV main cards)
- Premier Boxing Champions (except PPV main cards)
- ProBox TV
- Full Box Producciones
- WWE (Raw, SmackDown, Main Event, NXT and Vintage)

==== Other sports ====
- Major League Baseball
- National Football League
- Pro Padel League
- SVNS

=== Other programming ===
Alongside its live sports broadcasts, Fox Sports also airs a variety of sports highlight, talk, and documentary styled shows. These include:

- La Vuelta
- Telemétrico
- La Zona
- Fox Sports Radio
- Marketing Registrado
- Moving
- Rally Argentino
- La Jugada Perfecta
- Xtra Fit
- La Croqueta
- Hoy no se sale
- Ubeat Talks
- Ubeat Classics
- Ubeat Sagas
- Ubeat Incoming
- Elist
- Top Performers
- Top Leyends
- Fox Sports News

== See also ==
- Fox Sports International
- Fox Sports (Brazil)
- Fox Sports (Mexico)
- Fox Sports (Latin America)
- GOL TV
- ESPN Latin America
- TyC Sports
- DSports
- Claro Sports
