= Fox Sports (Israel) =

Israeli sports television channel

- Country: Israel
- Broadcast area: Israel
- Network: Fox Sports International

Programming
- Language: English
- Picture format: 1080i (HDTV) (downgraded to 16:9 576i for the SDTV)

Ownership
- Owner: Fox Networks Group (Walt Disney Direct-to-Consumer & International)

History
- Launched: 11 August 2000; 25 years ago
- Closed: 1 March 2020; 6 years ago

Links
- Website: www.foxsportsil.com

Fox Sports was an Israeli television sports channel owned by Fox Networks Group and was launched on 11 August 2000.

== Programming rights ==
=== American Football ===
- National Football League

=== Australian Rules Football ===
- Australian Football League

=== Baseball ===
- Major League Baseball

=== Hockey ===
- National Hockey League

=== Golf ===
- PGA Championship
- PGA EuroPro Tour
- Women's PGA Championship
- LPGA Tour

=== Rugby League ===
- National Rugby League

== See also ==
- Fox Sports International
- Fox Sports Netherlands
- Fox Sports Turkey
