= 2015 Copa Amsterdam =

The 2015 Copa Amsterdam was the 11th edition of the Copa Amsterdam (Aegon Copa Amsterdam), which took place at the Olympic Stadium in Amsterdam from 23 to 25 May 2015.

Teams participating in this edition:

- (Netherlands) Ajax
- (England) Arsenal
- (Italy) Lazio
- (Belgium) Anderlecht
- (Slovakia) Trenčín
- (Paraguay) Club Guaraní
- (Turkey) Beşiktaş
- (Norway) Rosenborg

== Group stage ==
=== Group 1 ===
Team	Pld	W	D	L	GF	GA	GD	Pts	Advancement
(Netherlands) Ajax	0	0	0	0	0	0	-	0	Semi-finals
(Belgium) Anderlecht	0	0	0	0	0	0	-	0	Semi-finals
(Turkey) Beşiktaş	0	0	0	0	0	0	-	0	Fifth Place Playoff
(Norway) Rosenborg	0	0	0	0	0	0	-	0	Seventh Place Playoff

23 May 2015
13:00 (CET)

Ajax (Netherlands)	v	(Norway) Rosenborg

23 May 2015
16:00 (CET)

Anderlecht (Belgium)	v	(Turkey) Beşiktaş

24 May 2015
13:00 (CET)

Ajax (Netherlands)	v	(Turkey) Beşiktaş

24 May 2015
14:00 (CET)

Rosenborg (Norway)	v	(Belgium) Anderlecht

24 May 2015
17:00 (CET)

Anderlecht (Belgium)	v	(Netherlands) Ajax

24 May 2015
18:00 (CET)

Beşiktaş (Turkey)	v	(Norway) Rosenborg

=== Group 2 ===
Team	Pld	W	D	L	GF	GA	GD	Pts	Advancement
(England) Arsenal	0	0	0	0	0	0	-	0	Semi-finals
(Italy) Lazio	0	0	0	0	0	0	-	0	Semi-finals
(Slovakia) Trenčín	0	0	0	0	0	0	-	0	Fifth Place Playoff
(Paraguay) Club Guaraní	0	0	0	0	0	0	-	0	Seventh Place Playoff

23 May 2015
14:00 (CET)

Lazio (Italy)	v	(Paraguay) Club Guaraní

23 May 2015
15:00 (CET)

Arsenal (England)	v	(Slovakia) Trenčín

24 May 2015
11:00 (CET)

Trenčín (Slovakia)	v	(Italy) Lazio

24 May 2015
12:00 (CET)

Club Guaraní (Paraguay)	v	(England) Arsenal

24 May 2015
15:00 (CET)

Trenčín (Slovakia)	v	(Paraguay) Club Guaraní

24 May 2015
16:00 (CET)

Arsenal (England)	v	(Italy) Lazio

== Play Offs ==
=== Seventh Place Playoff ===
25 May 2015
11:00 (CET)

Team no.4 Group A	v	Team no.4 Group B

=== Fifth Place Playoff ===
25 May 2015
14:00 (CET)

Team no.3 Group A	v	Team no.3 Group B

== Semi-finals ==
25 May 2015
12:00 (CET)

Team no.1 Group A	Semi-final 1	Team no.2 Group B

25 May 2015
13:00 (CET)

Team no.2 Group A	Semi-final 2	Team no.1 Group B

== Third place match ==
25 May 2015
15:15 (CET)

Loser Semi-final 1	v	Loser Semi-final 2

== Final ==
25 May 2015
16:15 (CET)

Winner Semi-final 1	v	Winner Semi-final 2
