= Dlife =

Japanese television channel

- Logo used since March 1, 2024
- Country: Japan
- Broadcast area: Nationwide
- Headquarters: Tokyo, Japan

Programming
- Languages: Japanese (dubbing; main); English (via SAP) (subtitles in Japanese)
- Picture format: HDTV 1080i; SDTV 480i

Ownership
- Owner: The Walt Disney Company (Japan) Ltd.
- Sister channels: Disney Channel; Disney Jr.

History
- Launched: 1 July 1998; 28 years ago
- Former names: Fox (1998–2024)

Links
- Website: www.dlife.jp

Dlife (ディーライフ, Dīraifu) is a Japanese pay television channel owned and operated by The Walt Disney Company Japan. Known as Fox until 2024, it specializes largely in international TV series.

The channel is not a continuation of the previous Dlife, which was a BS satellite channel. It aired similar programming, but also aired children's series (mostly drawn from Disney's extant channels), anime and lifestyle programming.

== History ==
Final logo as Fox, used from 2019 to 2024

The channel started broadcasting on 1 July 1998 on the SKY PerfecTV! satellite platform under News Corporation subsidiary News Broadcasting Japan (NBJ). The channel launched alongside Fox Family, Fox News and Star Plus. In its first year, it carried titles such as The X-Files, ER and Ally McBeal. Most of the programming was subtitled, and, in certain cases, new to Japan.

High definition broadcasts began in December 2009. Retransmission of the channel on U-Next ceased on 30 September 2020. It was resumed on 15 January 2021, expected to last until the end of July.

The channel was renamed from Fox to Dlife on 1 March 2024, using a brand Disney formerly owned for BS broadcasting. Some of its long-running series, such as NCIS and Criminal Minds, continued to air.
