= Shartouni =

Shartouni or francizied Chartouni is a surname of Lebanese descent. Notable people with the surname include:

- Habib Shartouni (born 1958), convicted assassin of the Lebanese president Bachir Gemayel
- Salim Chartouni (born 1973), Mexican footballer and commentator
