= Copa Amsterdam =

Association football tournament

- Founded: 2005
- Region: Worldwide
- Teams: 8
- Current champions: Ajax (3rd title)
- Most championships: Ajax; Cruzeiro (3 titles each)
- Broadcaster(s): Eredivisie Live; Eurosport; Fox Sports
- 2016 Copa Amsterdam

The Copa Amsterdam (known for sponsorship reasons as the Aegon Copa Amsterdam), formerly known as the Gestion Copa Amsterdam, is an annual youth football tournament, organized and hosted by AFC Ajax for under-19 youth teams which takes place at the Olympic Stadium in Amsterdam. The tournament has been contested by some of the strongest under-19 teams in football, with FC Barcelona, Chelsea and Cruzeiro amongst the participating clubs. The tournament is named after its main sponsor, the insurance company AEGON and was formerly named after the publishing company Gestion, and is broadcast online in over 59 countries via Eredivisie Live, Eurosport and Fox Sports.

== History ==
Established in 2005 as part of the annual Amsterdam Sport Weekend, a citywide sponsored initiative to promote 'sports and recreation' within the city of Amsterdam, the Copa Amsterdam is an international football youth tournament held in the historic Olympic Stadium since 2010. It was originally held at Sportpark Sloten, home of Blauw-Wit Amsterdam from its inception in 2005 up until 2009. Each summer the city of Amsterdam and AFC Ajax invites U-19 teams from various top clubs from around the World to play in the tournament. Seven teams are invited and participate in the competition every year with the ninth edition of the tournament having occurred in 2013. Over the years, clubs such as Barcelona, Juventus, Olympique de Marseille, Real Madrid have had their senior youth teams participate in the tournament.

While hosts Ajax have won the tournament twice (2007, 2011), Cruzeiro from Brazil have won it the most, holding a total of three titles to their name (2006, 2008, 2012). Other teams who have brought home the cup include Panathinaikos (2005), AZ (2009), Chelsea (2010) and Ajax Cape Town (2013). The prizes and awards were handed out by Johan Cruijff in 2009 and 2011, in 2010 it was done by Daley Blind and by Sjaak Swart two years later. Since the 2011 edition, the tournament has been broadcast live on Eredivisie Live on Dutch national television and over the internet with commentary by Leo Driessen, Mark van Rijswijk and Ron de Rijk.

The tournament is attended by prominent local football legends such as Frits Barend, Johan Cruijff and Danny Blind, and is frequented by many talent scouts. In accordance with the theme of the annual Amsterdam Sport Weekend however, an amateur team is put together consisting of local youth players, which is then coached by former Ajax players such as Ronald de Boer did with Men United in the 9th Edition of the tournament. In order to promote sport and recreation in the community, and to give young players an opportunity to present themselves at a high competitive level, coming from Amsterdam and the Region. Other teams that were assembled include the AT5 United, an all-star team composed of local Amsterdam talent, as well as FC NH (North Holland) which was an assembled selection of youth talent from the Dutch province of North Holland as a whole, and not limited to Amsterdam.

=== Board of Advisors ===
The Board of Advisors for the tournament consists of seven members, namely John Jaakke, Theo van Duivenbode, Jaap de Groot, René Zegerius, Oege Boonstra, Ronald de Boer and Maarten Oldenhof.

== Tournament results ==
=== 2005 (1st Edition) ===
(Source)

Final placement

Nr.	Team
1.	(Greece) Panathinaikos (1st title)
2.	(Netherlands) Ajax
3.	(Czech Republic) Sparta Prague
4.	(Spain) Barcelona
5.	(Brazil) Cruzeiro
6.	(Scotland) Rangers
7.	(Belgium) Anderlecht
8.	(Netherlands) AT5 United (Selection of Amsterdam's top amateurs)

=== 2006 (2nd Edition) ===
(Source)

Final placement

Nr.	Team
1.	(Brazil) Cruzeiro (1st title)
2.	(Portugal) Sporting CP
3.	(Netherlands) Ajax
4.	(Turkey) Galatasaray
5.	(Netherlands) AT5 United (Selection of Amsterdam's top amateurs)
6.	(Spain) Espanyol
7.	(Greece) Olympiacos
8.	(Turkey) Fenerbahçe

=== 2007 (3rd Edition) ===
(Source)

Final placement

Nr.	Team
1.	(Netherlands) Ajax (1st title)
2.	(Germany) Werder Bremen
3.	(South Africa) Ajax Cape Town
4.	(Brazil) Cruzeiro
5.	(Netherlands) FC NH (Selection of North Holland's top amateurs)
6.	(Turkey) Fenerbahçe
7.	(United States) Florida Soccer Alliance
8.	(Scotland) Rangers

=== 2008 (4th Edition) ===
(Source)

Final placement

Nr.	Team
1.	(Brazil) Cruzeiro (2nd title)
2.	(Netherlands) Ajax
3.	(Spain) Valencia
4.	(Brazil) Atlético Mineiro
5.	(Netherlands) FC NH (Selection of North Holland's top amateurs)
6.	(South Africa) Ajax Cape Town
7.	(Netherlands) AZ
8.	(Italy) Juventus

=== 2009 (5th Edition) ===
(Source)

Final placement

Nr.	Team
1.	(Netherlands) AZ (1st title)
2.	(Netherlands) Ajax
3.	(Norway) Rosenborg
4.	(Mexico) Guadalajara
5.	(Spain) Real Madrid
6.	(England) Chelsea
7.	(England) Watford
8.	(Netherlands) FC NH (Selection of North Holland's top amateurs)

=== 2010 (6th Edition) ===
(Source)

Final placement

Nr.	Team
1.	(England) Chelsea (1st title)
2.	(Spain) Sevilla
3.	(Netherlands) AZ
4.	(Netherlands) Ajax
5.	(Brazil) Fluminense
6.	(Mexico) Guadalajara
7.	(Netherlands) FC NH (Selection of North Holland's top amateurs)
8.	(Brazil) Botafogo

=== 2011 (7th Edition) ===
(Source)

Final placement

Nr.	Team
1.	(Netherlands) Ajax (2nd title)
2.	(Brazil) Botafogo
3.	(England) Tottenham Hotspur
4.	(Slovakia) AS Trenčín
5.	(Belgium) Anderlecht
6.	(Germany) Borussia Dortmund
7.	(Brazil) Cruzeiro
8.	(France) Olympique de Marseille

=== 2012 (8th Edition) ===
(Source)

Final placement

Nr.	Team
1.	(Brazil) Cruzeiro (3rd title)
2.	(Brazil) Botafogo
3.	(Netherlands) Ajax
4.	(South Africa) Ajax Cape Town
5.	China national under-19 team
6.	(Turkey) Beşiktaş JK
7.	(Netherlands) AZ
8.	(Greece) Panathinaikos

=== 2013 (9th Edition) ===
(Source)

Final placement

Nr.	Team
1.	(South Africa) Ajax Cape Town (1st title)
2.	(Germany) Borussia Mönchengladbach
3.	(Brazil) Cruzeiro
4.	(Brazil) Fluminense
5.	(England) Tottenham Hotspur
6.	(Netherlands) Ajax
7.	(Ghana) Berekum Chelsea
8.	(Netherlands) Men United (Talent team coached by Ronald de Boer)

=== 2014 (10th Edition) ===
(Source)

Final placement

Nr.	Team
1.	(Brazil) Fluminense (1st title)
2.	(Brazil) Cruzeiro
3.	(China) Dalian Aerbin
4.	(South Africa) Ajax Cape Town
5.	(Netherlands) Men United (Talent team coached by Ronald de Boer)
6.	(Netherlands) Ajax
7.	(Greece) Panathinaikos
8.	(Germany) Hamburger SV

=== 2015 (11th Edition) ===
(Source)

Final placement

Nr.	Team
1.	(Belgium) Anderlecht (1st title)
2.	(Netherlands) Ajax
3.	(Netherlands) Vitesse
4.	(Paraguay) Club Guaraní
5.	(Turkey) Beşiktaş JK
6.	(England) Arsenal
7.	(Slovakia) AS Trenčín
8.	(Norway) Rosenborg

=== 2016 (12th Edition) ===
(Source)

Final placement

Nr.	Team
1.	(South Africa) Ajax Cape Town (2nd title)
2.	(England) Tottenham Hotspur
3.	(Netherlands) Ajax
4.	(Ecuador) ASA United FC (Talent team coached by Piet de Visser)
5.	(Spain) Barcelona
6.	(Ghana) Right to Dream
7.	(Netherlands) PSV
8.	(Turkey) Galatasaray

=== 2017–2018 ===
For the first time in 12 years the tournament was not held in 2017 due to scheduling issues, with the organizational body making an official statement, that the tournament would presume the following year.

=== 2019 (13th Edition) ===
The following year the tournament was withheld once more. On 25 April 2019, Ajax announced that the tournament would finally presume, and will be held on 29 and 30 June at the Olympic Stadium. The invited teams include Ajax Cape Town, Sagan Tosu and Sparta Rotterdam.

(Source)

Final placement

Nr.	Team
1.	(Netherlands) Ajax (3rd title)
2.	(Netherlands) Sparta Rotterdam
3.	(Japan) Sagan Tosu
4.	(South Africa) Ajax Cape Town

== Participation ==
=== By country ===
Rank	Country	Berths	Teams
1	Netherlands	28	Ajax (13), AZ (4), FC NH (4), AT5 United (2), Men United (2), PSV (1), Sparta Rotterdam (1), Vitesse (1)
2	Brazil	14	Cruzeiro (7), Botafogo (3), Fluminense (3), Atlético Mineiro (1)
3	England	7	Tottenham Hotspur (3), Chelsea (2), Watford (1), Arsenal (1)
3	South Africa	7	Ajax Cape Town (7)
4	Spain	6	Barcelona (2), Espanyol (1), Real Madrid (1), Sevilla (1), Valencia (1)
4	Turkey	6	Beşiktaş JK (2), Fenerbahçe (2), Galatasaray (2)
5	Germany	4	Borussia Dortmund (1), Borussia Mönchengladbach (1), Hamburger SV (1), Werder Bremen (1)
5	Greece	4	Panathinaikos (3), Olympiacos (1)
6	Belgium	3	Anderlecht (3)
7	China	2	China U-19 (1), Dalian Aerbin (1)
7	Ghana	2	Berekum Chelsea (1), Right to Dream (1)
7	Mexico	2	Guadalajara (2)
7	Norway	2	Rosenborg (2)
7	Scotland	2	Rangers (2)
7	Slovakia	2	AS Trenčín (2)
8
8	Czech Republic	1	Sparta Prague (1)
8	Ecuador	1	ASA United (1)
8	France	1	Olympique de Marseille (1)
8	Italy	1	Juventus (1)
8	Japan	1	Sagan Tosu (1)
8	Paraguay	1	Club Guaraní (1)
8	Portugal	1	Sporting CP (1)
8	United States	1	Florida Soccer Alliance (1)

== Titles and awards ==
=== Number of titles ===
(Source)

Nr.	Club	Titles	Winning years
1	(Netherlands) Ajax	3	2007, 2011, 2019
1	(Brazil) Cruzeiro	3	2006, 2008, 2012
3	(South Africa) Ajax Cape Town	2	2013, 2016
4	(Greece) Panathinaikos	1	2005
4	(Netherlands) AZ	1	2009
4	(England) Chelsea	1	2010
4	(Brazil) Fluminense	1	2014
4	(Belgium) Anderlecht	1	2015

=== Official Hall of Fame ===
(Source) The players below are part of the Copa Amsterdam Hall of Fame.

2005

- (Netherlands) Milano Koenders (DF)
- (Finland) Niklas Moisander (DF)
- (Netherlands) Rydell Poepon (FW)
- (Netherlands) Donovan Slijngard (DF)
- (Spain) Jeffrén Suárez (FW)
- (Netherlands) Kenneth Vermeer (GK)
- (Belgium) Jan Vertonghen (DF)

2006

- (Morocco) Nordin Amrabat (FW)
- (Turkey) Mehmet Güven (MF)
- (Turkey) Özgürcan Özcan (FW)
- (Portugal) Rui Patrício (GK)
- (Portugal) Bruno Pereirinha (MF)
- (Netherlands) Jeffrey Sarpong (MF)
- (Netherlands) Robert Schilder (MF)

2007

- (Curaçao) Vurnon Anita (MF)
- (Netherlands) Daley Blind (DF)
- (Suriname) Mitchell Donald (MF)
- (Netherlands) Jan-Arie van der Heijden (MF)
- (Netherlands) Siem de Jong (MF)

2007 (continued)

- (Curaçao) Javier Martina (FW)
- (Netherlands) Gregory van der Wiel (DF)

2008

- (Belgium) Toby Alderweireld (DF)
- (Denmark) Christian Eriksen (MF)
- (Netherlands) John Goossens (MF)
- (Suriname) Florian Jozefzoon (FW)
- (Morocco) Moestafa El Kabir (FW)
- (Netherlands) Marvin Zeegelaar (MF)

2009

- (Netherlands) Lorenzo Ebecilio (FW)

2011

- (Netherlands) Marco Bizot (GK)
- (Netherlands) Tom Boere (MF)
- (Netherlands) Ouasim Bouy (MF)
- (Netherlands) Lorenzo Burnet (DF)
- (Brazil) Hyago (FW)
- (Netherlands) Davy Klaassen (MF)
- (Democratic Republic of the Congo) Jody Lukoki (FW)
- (Netherlands) Lesley de Sa (FW)

2011 (continued)

- (Brazil) Élber Silva (MF)
- (Brazil) Vitinho (MF)

== See also ==
- Amsterdam Tournament
- Future Cup
