= Nación Deportes =

Cable television network

- Country: Mexico
- Broadcast area: Mexico
- Headquarters: Mexico City, Mexico

Programming
- Language: Spanish
- Picture format: HDTV 1080i (downscaled to 480i/576i for the SD feed)

Ownership
- Owner: Liberty Media (1995-1996); News Corporation (1996-2013); 21st Century Fox (2013-2019); The Walt Disney Company (2019-2021); Grupo Multimedia Lauman (2021-present)

History
- Launched: Fox Sports: 31 October 1995; Fox Sports 2: 12 October 2009; Fox Sports 3: 5 November 2012
- Replaced: Speed (Fox Sports 3)
- Former names: Prime Deportiva (1995–1996); Fox Sports Americas (1996–1999); Fox Sports Mexico (1999–2026)

Links
- Website: naciondeportes.com

Nación Deportes, formerly Fox Sports Mexico, is a Mexican pay television network operated by Grupo Multimedia Lauman. The network focuses on sports-related programming including live and pre-recorded event broadcasts, sports talk shows and original programming, available throughout Mexico. The network utilized the Fox Sports name under a license agreement that had been under legal dispute with brand owner Fox Corporation.

== History ==
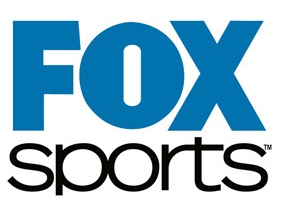
Fox Sports logo, used from 2009 to 2012.

The network was launched in 1996 as Prime Deportiva, under the ownership of Liberty Media. Prior to its launch, on October 31, 1995, News Corporation acquired a 50% ownership interest in Liberty's Prime Network group and its international networks (including sister channels Premier Sports and Prime Sports Asia) as part of an expansion of its Fox Sports properties in the Americas. In 1996, the channel was rebranded as Fox Sports Américas, later shortened to Fox Sports in 1999. In 2002, Hicks, Muse, Tate and Furst, a Dallas private equity firm, Liberty Media Corp and News Corp created a holding company (Fox Pan American Sports) to jointly operate FOX Sports Latin America. News Corp owned approximately 38% interest. Liberty later exited leaving HMTF and News Corp as co-owners of the cable network. News Corp purchased the ownership rights from HMTF of FOX Sports en Español and rebranded as FOX Deportes in 2010. News Corp purchased the remaining ownership rights for the holding company from HMTF and fully owned the FOX Sports Latin America cable network in 2011.

Fox Sports logo, used from February to November 2012.

In 2009, a second feed called Fox Sports+ (FOX Sports Plus) was launched, to allow simultaneous broadcasting of football. In 2010, FOX Sports signed a deal with UFC to be the first cable network to show it in Latin America. FOX Sports also opened a studio in 2010 in Mexico City where it broadcasts original programming and licensed programming. In 2012, the channel was renamed to Fox Sports 2, whereas Speed Channel was rebranded to Fox Sports 3.

On February 21, 2019, Bloomberg reported that Disney had divest the Fox Sports television network from the 21st Century Fox purchase in order to get an approval from the governments of Mexico and Brazil. The division was among the last major hurdles for the Disney-Fox deal.

On May 22, 2021, Disney announced it would sell Fox Sports Mexico to Grupo Multimedia Lauman with the deal being expected to close in 2021, pending regulatory approval. On June 9, 2021, the transaction was approved by the Mexican Federal Telecommunications Institute.

On August 30, 2026, Fox Sports Mexico was removed from Sky Mexico and Izzi.

=== Legal battle against Fox Corporation ===
On March 4, 2025, Fox Sports Mexico announced through a statement that it had taken legal action against Fox Corporation and Grupo Pachuca because its alleged right of first refusal to offer to continue broadcasting the home matches of Club León and Club Pachuca in the Liga MX had not been respected, for which reason the channel asked a judge to order that these games remain without official broadcast through the streaming service Tubi (owned by Fox Corp.) until the matter is resolved.

However, both Fox Corporation and Grupo Pachuca subsequently responded, clarifying that Grupo Lauman had not paid the corresponding amount for the television rights of both clubs, that Fox Corp.'s negotiation for these rights was therefore legal and that the games would continue to be streamed on Tubi. Furthermore, Fox Corp. indicated that Grupo Lauman's permit to use the Fox brand in Mexico had expired, and that it would therefore have to be phased out (Fox Sports later denied this last point).

On March 21, it was reported that Fox Corporation had filed a civil lawsuit against Grupo Lauman in Los Angeles, California, claiming 850 million Mexican pesos (52 million US dollars) because, according to the lawsuit, Fox Corp. was the one who acquired the broadcast rights to the home games of Grupo Pachuca's teams in the Torneo Apertura 2024 and that the Mexican channel had obtained a sublicense to continue airing them during the course of the negotiations that the American company had with Grupo Lauman to acquire Fox Sports Mexico, of which the corresponding payment of MXN 221 million (13 million dollars) would not have been carried out by the Mexican company.

On April 4, 2025, both Tubi and Grupo Pachuca confirmed that the match between Pachuca and América, corresponding to matchday 14 of the Liga MX Clausura 2025, would not be broadcast anywhere following a judge's order. The decision stemmed from the legal dispute that began in March between Fox, Pachuca, and Lauman. On April 8, Club Pachuca confirmed that its streams would return to Tubi following a favorable ruling from a federal court, and it was reported that Grupo Pachuca had sued Grupo Lauman for damages.

On June 19, 2025, it was confirmed that the company had acquired sports-oriented broadcaster Caliente TV to expand its presence in sports rights—which it already owned via Tubi in Mexico and Central America—through a future multiplatform offering that will include, in addition to Tubi (a free service), a subscription television channel and a SVOD service.

On August 14, 2025, the company filed a lawsuit in the Southern District Court of New York against Media Deportes México, operator of Grupo Lauman's Fox Sports MX, seeking to bar the use of the “Fox Sports” trademark in Mexico and the United States for 14 days. Fox Corp. argued that the rights to the brand had expired in March 2025 and were subsequently misused.

== Feeds ==
=== Localised channels ===
- Nación Deportes Premium — Additional pay-TV channel that was launched in April 2022 to air the Mexican football matches from free-to-air airing on State television, such as the Liga MX (National First Division).

== Programming ==
Nación Deportes broadcasts sports-related programming 24 hours a day in Spanish.

=== Sports programming ===
- All Elite Wrestling
- Consejo Mundial de Lucha Libre
- Liga ACB
- FIBA Basketball World Cup
- FIBA Women's Basketball World Cup
- Liga Nacional de Baloncesto Profesional
- Liga Nacional de Baloncesto Profesional Femenil
- Central American and Caribbean Games
- Major Arena Soccer League
- Volleyball World Beach Pro Tour
- LUX Fight League
- Budo Sento Championship
- Modern Pentathlon World Cup
- Súper Copa Roshfrans GTM
- Federación Mexicana de Fútbol Americano

=== Other programming ===
Alongside its live sports broadcasts, Nación Deportes also airs a variety of sports highlight, talk, and documentary styled shows. These include:

- +90
- Central Nación
- Nación Fight Club
- Nación Gol Femenil
- Nación Gol México
- Nación Deportes Radio
- Nación Fit
- La Última Palabra
- Money Line Show
- AEW All Elite Show

== Personalities ==
- (Mexico) Alberto "Beto" Rojas
- (Mexico) Alejandro "Alex" Blanco
- (Mexico) Alejandro Correa
- (Mexico) Arturo Villanueva
- (Mexico) Blanca Ríos
- (Mexico) Carlos Hermosillo
- (Mexico) Carlos Rodrigo Hernández
- (Mexico) Carlos Sequeyro
- (Mexico) Carlos Velasco
- (Mexico) Christian Elguea
- (Mexico) Claudio Rodríguez
- (Mexico) Daniel Reyes
- (Mexico) David Espinosa
- (Mexico) Eduardo Sainz
- (Mexico) Eduardo de la Torre
- (Mexico) (United States) Ernesto del Valle
- (Chile) Fabián Estay
- (Mexico) Fernando Bastién
- (Mexico) Fernando Lara
- (Mexico) Ignacio Hierro
- (Mexico) Iván del Ángel
- (Mexico) Jimena Sánchez
- (Mexico) Joaquín del Olmo
- (Mexico) Luis Silva
- (Mexico) Mariana Velázquez de León
- (Mexico) Mónica Arredondo
- (Mexico) Natalia Gómez Junco
- (Mexico) Natalia Rivera
- (Mexico) Oscar Guzman
- (Mexico) Pamela Gasca
- (Mexico) Paul Aguilar
- (Mexico) Pepe Segarra
- (Mexico) Raoul Ortíz
- (Panama) Ricardo García Ochoa
- (Mexico) Rodrigo Tovar
- (Mexico) Santiago Puente

== See also ==
- Fox Sports International
- Fox Sports (Argentina)
- Fox Sports (Brazil)
- Fox Sports (Latin America)
- GOL TV
- ESPN Latin America
- TyC Sports
- DSports
- Claro Sports
