= Sergio Vargas (footballer, born 1965) =

Argentine-born Chilean footballer and manager

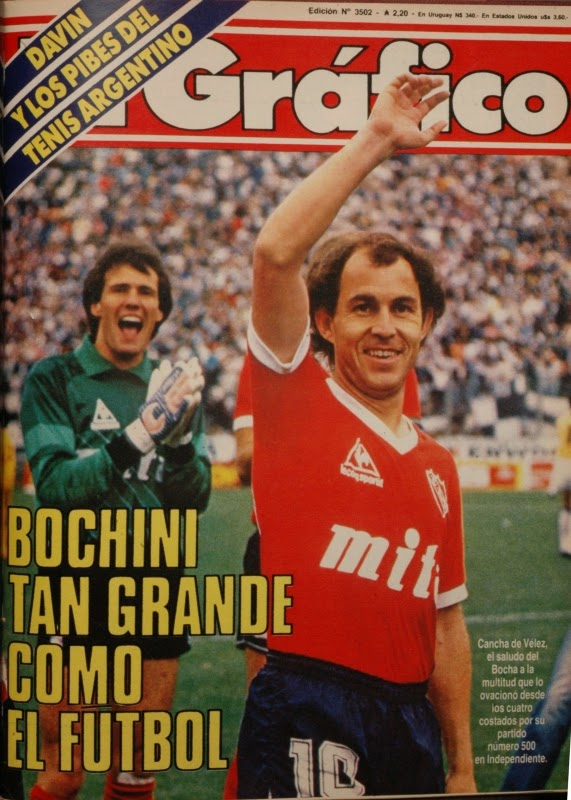
- Vargas in 1986

Personal information
- Full name: Sergio Bernabé Vargas Buscalia
- Date of birth: 17 August 1965 (age 61)
- Place of birth: Chacabuco, Buenos Aires, Argentina
- Height: 1.83 m (6 ft 0 in)
- Position: Goalkeeper

Youth career
- Independiente

Senior career*
Years	Team	Apps	(Gls)
1988–1992	Independiente	101	(0)
1992	Emelec	14	(0)
1993–2002	Universidad de Chile	428	(0)
2003	Unión Española	15	(0)
2004–2005	PSM Makassar	26	(0)
Total		584	(0)

International career
2001	Chile	10	(0)

Managerial career
- 2010: Jugendland
- 2011: Deportes Temuco
- 2013: Universidad Iberoamericana
- 2014: Curicó Unido
- 2015: Trasandino
- 2019–2021: Universidad de Chile (sporting director)
- * Club domestic league appearances and goals

Sergio Bernabé Vargas Buscalia (born 17 August 1965) is a professional football manager and former player who played as a goalkeeper. Born in Argentina, he received ten caps for the Chile national team during his career.

== Club career ==
Vargas was born in Chacabuco, Buenos Aires. He began his career in Independiente. After three seasons at the club with 98 appearances, he left for Club Sport Emelec of Ecuador. However Vargas left after a season to join Universidad de Chile.

Vargas, with other players such as Luis Musrri, Rogelio Delgado, Esteban Valencia, Marcelo Salas and Rodrigo Goldberg, helped Universidad de Chile to win the Primera División de Chile in 1994 and again in 1995. Before 1994, Universidad de Chile last won the championship in 1969.

Vargas will continue to win the Copa Chile in 1998 with Universidad de Chile. In 2000, he won the double with Universidad de Chile, winning both the Primera División de Chile and Copa Chile.

Vargas earned the nickname "Superman" for his constant saves in the air, especially in the last few moments.

In 2002, the president of Universidad de Chile, Dr. René Orozco, terminated Vargas's contract. Vargas then left for Unión Española where he stayed for as season. He then went to PSM Makassar in Indonesia. After two seasons, Vargas retired from soccer in 2005.

Recently entitled football coach, after a brief passage as technical manager at Universidad de Chile.

== International career ==
Vargas was summoned for selection by Argentina U17 team but played for Chile in 2002 FIFA World Cup qualifiers.

Vargas made his debut match against Uruguay on 24 April 2001, which Chile lost 0–1 to an own goal.

He was also capped for the 2001 Copa América, playing four matches as Chile were knocked out in the quarterfinals.

== Managerial career ==
In 2010, Vargas began his coaching career with Sportverein Jugendland Fussball in the Chilean Tercera B. The next year, he moved to Deportes Temuco in the Tercera A.

In 2014, he coached Curicó Unido in the Primera B and, in 2015, he coached Trasandino in the Segunda División Profesional.

In addition, Vargas has worked as sports director of Universidad de Chile on two steps: from 2006 to 2007 and from 2019 to 2021 alongside Rodrigo Goldberg.

In January 2023, he assumed as Sport Manager of Barnechea.

== Personal life ==
His son, Emanuel, has been a professional footballer who played as a goalkeeper. In addition, he is the father-in-law of the former Chile international midfielder Manuel Iturra.

After his retirement, Vargas has worked as a football commentator and analyst in different TV and radio media, such as Canal del Fútbol, Mega, Chilevisión, Fox Sports Chile and ADN Radio Chile. In addition, he has worked for the newspaper La Tercera.

== Honours ==
Independiente

- Copa Libertadores: 1984
- Intercontinental Cup: 1984
- Argentine Primera División: 1988–89

Universidad de Chile

- Primera División de Chile: 1994, 1995, 1999, 2000
- Copa Chile: 1998, 2000
