= Manuel Iturra =

Chilean footballer and manager (born 1984)

Personal information
- Full name: Manuel Rolando Iturra Urrutia
- Date of birth: 23 June 1984 (age 42)
- Place of birth: Temuco, Chile
- Height: 1.74 m (5 ft 9 in)
- Position: Defensive midfielder

Team information
- Current team: Universidad de Chile (assistant)

Youth career
- Universidad de Chile

Senior career*
Years	Team	Apps	(Gls)
2003–2012	Universidad de Chile	216	(6)
2011	→ União Leiria (loan)	11	(0)
2011–2012	→ Murcia (loan)	35	(1)
2012–2013	Málaga	25	(0)
2013–2015	Granada	64	(1)
2015–2016	Udinese	17	(0)
2016	→ Rayo Vallecano (loan)	6	(0)
2016–2017	Necaxa	47	(0)
2018	Málaga	20	(0)
2018–2019	Villarreal	3	(0)
2019	Maccabi Haifa	2	(0)
2019	Deportes Iquique	10	(0)
2021–2022	Atlético Marbellí	7	(0)
Total		463	(8)

International career
2005–2012	Chile	33	(1)

Managerial career
- 2021–2022: UD San Pedro (youth)
- 2022–2023: Universidad de Chile (youth)
- 2024–: Universidad de Chile (assistant)
- * Club domestic league appearances and goals

Manuel Rolando Iturra Urrutia (Latin American Spanish: [ma'nwel i'tura]; born 23 June 1984) is a Chilean former professional footballer who played as a defensive midfielder. He currently is an assistant coach at Universidad de Chile.

== Club career ==
=== U. Chile and Leiria ===
Born in Temuco, Iturra made his Primera División debut with Club Universidad de Chile in 2003, aged 19. He proceeded to be a first-team regular from his second season onwards, helping La U to the 2004 and 2009 Apertura tournaments.

In January 2011, Iturra was loaned to U.D. Leiria in Portugal, first appearing in the Primeira Liga on 12 February when he played the full 90 minutes in a 1–0 away win against C.D. Nacional. He started in all but one of the league matches he featured in for the club, as it eventually finished in tenth position.

=== Spain ===
For 2011–12, Iturra joined Real Murcia of the Spanish Segunda División. After featuring heavily during the campaign he returned to Universidad, where he had his contract terminated.

On 28 August 2012, free agent Iturra became the first summer signing of Málaga CF, as a direct replacement for Enzo Maresca who had moved to U.C. Sampdoria a few days before. He made his official debut on 18 September in the club's first-ever UEFA Champions League group stage match, coming on as a half-time substitute for Francisco Portillo in a 3–0 home victory over FC Zenit Saint Petersburg.

Iturra scored his first goal for Málaga on 16 January 2013, profiting from a defensive scramble to put the visitors ahead at the Camp Nou against FC Barcelona, in an eventual 2–2 draw in the Copa del Rey (6–4 aggregate loss). He finished his first season at La Rosaleda Stadium with 39 appearances in all competitions, helping to a sixth-place finish in the league.

From 2013 to 2015, Iturra represented Granada CF also in La Liga after signing a three-year contract. He made his competitive debut for his new team on 18 August, featuring 90 minutes in a 2–1 win at CA Osasuna.

=== Udinese ===
On 23 July 2015, Iturra joined Udinese Calcio, which like Granada was also owned by Italian businessman Giampaolo Pozzo. His maiden Serie A match was on 23 August, and he played the entire 1–0 away defeat of Juventus FC.

Iturra signed a six-month loan deal with Rayo Vallecano on 30 January 2016. He made just four starts during his brief stay.

=== Later years ===
On 4 June 2016, Iturra left Europe agreeing to a contract with Mexico's Club Necaxa. He returned to Spain two years later, joining Villarreal CF for free and leaving the club by mutual consent on 2 January 2019.

In July 2021, Iturra was appointed youth manager of UD San Pedro, a small club in the Province of Málaga.

In the 2021–2022 season, Iturra played for CD Atlético Marbellí in the Segunda Andaluza, making 7 appearances.

== International career ==
Iturra made his debut for Chile on 17 August 2005, against Peru. On 24 May of the following year, he scored the game's only goal in a friendly with the Republic of Ireland.

Iturra represented the nation at the 2007 Copa América in Venezuela, helping the side to the quarter-finals.

=== International goals ===
#	Date	Venue	Opponent	Score	Result	Competition
1.	24 May 2006	Lansdowne Road, Dublin, Republic of Ireland	Republic of Ireland	1–0	Win	Friendly

== Coaching career ==
In 2021, he began his career as coach of UD San Pedro Juvenil A team. In 2022, he joined Universidad de Chile youth system, being confirmed for the 2023 season.

For the 2024 season, he joined the technical staff of Gustavo Álvarez in the first team.

== Personal life ==
Iturra married Nadia Vargas, the daughter of the former Chile international goalkeeper Sergio Vargas. In addition, he is the brother-in-law of the also former goalkeeper, Emanuel Vargas.

== Honours ==
Universidad de Chile

- Primera División de Chile: 2004 Apertura, 2009 Clausura
