= Fernando Tornello =

Argentine journalist and TV host

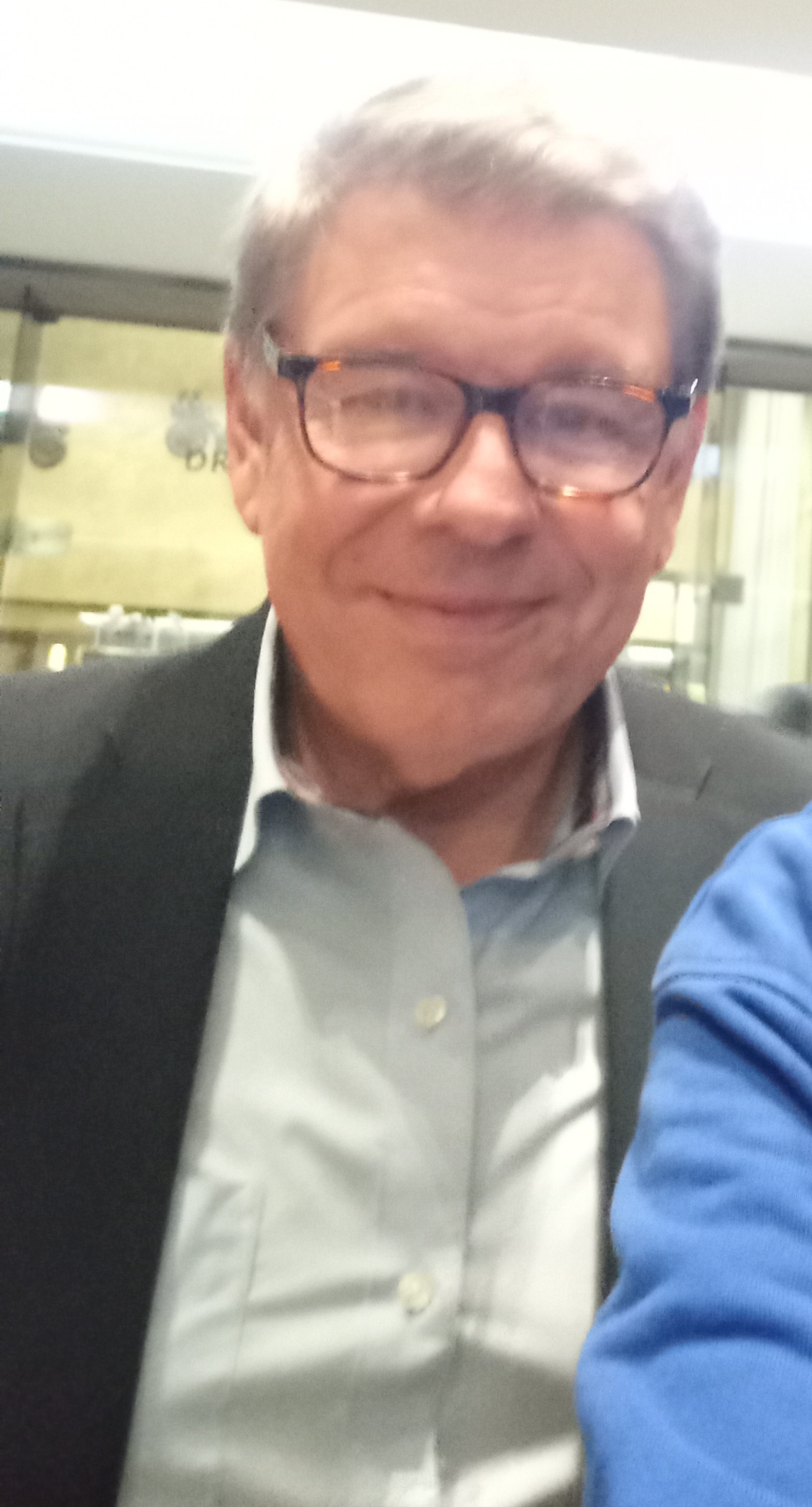
- Born: Fernando Tornello; 4 October 1952 (age 73); Buenos Aires, Argentina
- Occupations: Journalist and television presenter
- Years active: 1976-present
- Employers: Telefe (1990-1999); PSN (2000-2001); Fox Sports (2002-2020); ESPN (2021-present)

Fernando Tornello (born 4 October 1952) is an Argentine sports journalist and television presenter. He is especially known for his television broadcasts of Formula One for Hispanic America on various channels.

== Biography ==
Born in Buenos Aires, Tornello initially began studying law, which he eventually abandoned to study journalism.

His career as Formula One journalist started in 1976 in a radio broadcasting.

In 1990, he joined Telefe to broadcast Formula 3 Sudamericana together with Felipe Mc Gough. That same year, Telefe acquired the rights to broadcast Formula One in Argentina, and Tornello was chosen to cover the races until 1999. In 2000 and 2001, Panamerican Sports Network (PSN) was in charge of transmission in Latin America and were later acquired by Fox Sports, where Tornello continued as narrator. After Fox Corporation was bought by Disney, the rights was passed to ESPN.

At the same time, he presents the program El Show de la Fórmula 1 since 2002, currently airing on ESPN Latin America. Also he presented sports programs as Última Vuelta and Rally Mundial in Fox Sports, and was editor for Motorsport.com in Latin America. In 2021, Tornello started a program via streaming called 7 décadas de pasión, and at the same time he is a Formula One analyst for the program and website Campeones.

Throughout his career, he has shared broadcasts with Juan Fazzini, Adrián Puente, Juan Fossaroli, Diego Mejía, Juan Manuel López and Albert Fàbrega. On the other hand, he was a promoter of the Argentine Grand Prix with Felipe Mc Gough in the 1990s.
