= Fox Sports (Italy) =

Italian sports TV channel

- Country: Italy
- Broadcast area: Italy
- Network: Fox Sports International
- Headquarters: Rome, Italy

Programming
- Language: Italian
- Picture format: 1080i (HDTV) (downgraded to 16:9 480i for the SDTV)

Ownership
- Owner: Fox Networks Group Italy (21st Century Fox)

History
- Launched: Fox Sports: August 9, 2013; Fox Sports 2: December 20, 2013
- Closed: Fox Sports: June 30, 2018; Fox Sports 2: June 29, 2015

Links
- Website: www.foxsports.it

Fox Sports was an Italian pay television sports channel that was launched on August 9, 2013. A second channel, Fox Sports 2 was launched on December 20, 2013. The first channel closed in late August 2018, after the second closed in 2015. On June 20, 2018, the closure of the channel was announced, which took place with the last day of broadcasting on the following June 30. As of July 1, 2018, the channel is no longer available.

== Programming rights ==
=== American Football ===
- National Football League

=== Australian Rules Football ===
- Australian Football League

=== Football ===
- Premier League
- FA Cup
- Community Shield
- Bundesliga
- DFL-Supercup
- Eredivisie
- Copa Libertadores
- Copa Sudamericana
- Recopa Sudamericana
- La Liga
- Ligue 1
- Africa Cup of Nations

=== Motorsports ===
- World Rally Championship

=== Martial Arts ===
- UFC

=== Volleyball ===
- CEV Women's Champions League

=== Baseball ===
- Major League Baseball

=== Hockey ===
- National Hockey League

=== Darts ===
- PDC World Darts Championship
- Premier League Darts

== Programs broadcast by Fox Sports in Italy ==
- Fox Sports Live
- Football Station
- Viva la Liga
- Bundes Platz
- USA Sport Today

== See also ==
- Fox Sports International
- Fox Sports Netherlands
