= Sergio Núñez (Chilean footballer) =

Chilean footballer (born 1982)

Personal information
- Full name: Sergio Antonio Núñez Morales
- Date of birth: 30 April 1982 (age 44)
- Place of birth: Chile
- Height: 1.78 m (5 ft 10 in)
- Position: Forward

Youth career
- Cobreloa

Senior career*
Years	Team	Apps	(Gls)
2001–2002	Cobreloa	8	(1)
2002	→ Deportes Iquique (loan)	5	(4)
2003–2004	Deportes Antofagasta	31	(11)
2005–2006	Atlante	0	(0)
2005	→ Potros Neza (loan)	16	(4)
2005	→ Santiago Wanderers (loan)	0	(0)
2006	→ Deportes La Serena (loan)	9	(1)
2006	→ Real Colima (loan)	6	(0)
2006–2007	Deportes La Serena	14	(1)
2008	Coquimbo Unido	30	(3)
2009–2010	San Marcos	36	(7)
2011–2012	Unión San Felipe	37	(4)
2012	Unión San Felipe B	3	(0)
2013–2014	Coquimbo Unido	49	(13)
2014–2015	Lota Schwager	15	(4)
2015	CAI	16	(3)
Total		275	(56)
- * Club domestic league appearances and goals

Sergio Antonio Núñez Morales (born 30 April 1982) is a Chilean former professional footballer who played as a forward for clubs in Chile, Mexico and Argentina.

== Career ==
A forward, Núñez is a product of Cobreloa youth system, he made appearances for the club in the 2001 Chilean Primera División.

In the Chilean Primera División, he also played for Santiago Wanderers, Deportes La Serena and Unión San Felipe. In the Primera B, he played for Deportes Iquique on loan from Cobreloa, Deportes Antofagasta, Coquimbo Unido, San Marcos de Arica and Lota Schwager. In February 2015, he was released from Lota Schwager after having a fight with his fellow Emanuel Vargas.

With Coquimbo Unido, they won the 2014 Clausura of the Primera B.

Abroad, he played for Potros Neza and Real Colima in the Mexican Primera División A and Comisión de Actividades Infantiles in the Torneo Argentino A.

== Honours ==
Coquimbo Unido

- Primera B: 2014 Clausura (Note: no promotion to Primera División),
