= Fox Sports International (Netherlands) =

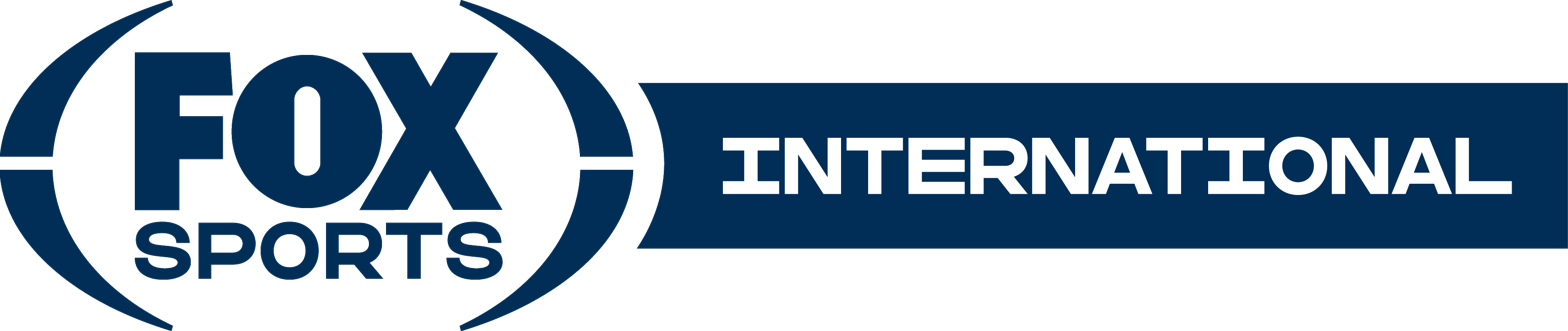
- Country: Netherlands
- Broadcast area: Netherlands
- Network: Fox Sports

Programming
- Language: Dutch
- Picture format: 1080i HDTV (downscaled to 16:9 576i for the SDTV feed)

Ownership
- Owner: Eredivisie Media & Marketing CV
- Sister channels: Fox Sports Eredivisie; Fox; National Geographic; National Geographic Wild; 24Kitchen; BabyTV

History
- Launched: 17 August 2013; 12 years ago
- Closed: 31 December 2020; 4 years ago
- Replaced by: ESPN

Links
- Website: www.foxsports.nl

Availability (at time of closure)

Streaming media
- Ziggo GO: ZiggoGO.tv (Europe only)
- Fox Sports GO: Watch live (Netherlands only)

Fox Sports International was a premium television service in the Netherlands, owned by Eredivisie Media & Marketing CV (in which Fox Networks Group Benelux (part of Fox) had 51% share and football clubs together with Endemol 49%) and launched on 17 August 2013.

The service contained three channels covering several European football leagues and live tennis from the ATP World Tour and WTA Tour.

On 1 October 2020, it was announced that the networks would rebrand as ESPN on 31 December 2020, due to the acquisition of 21st Century Fox by Disney.

== Channels ==
- Fox Sports 4
- Fox Sports 5
- Fox Sports 6

== Coverage ==
- Copa America All matches live
- CONCACAF Gold Cup all matches live
- Africa Cup of Nations all matches live
- UEFA Europa League In Group Stage till Quarterfinal 4 Matches LIVE on Thursday (2 at 19.00 & 2 at 21.00), From Quarterfinal all Matches LIVE (Excluding Game broadcast by RTL 7, except the Final)
- CONMEBOL Libertadores
- CONMEBOL Sudamericana
- CONMEBOL Recopa
- Bundesliga
- Taca de Portugal Only the Final Live
- Coupe de France Only the Final live
- Scottish Cup Only the Final live
- K-League
- NFL
- NHL
- MLB
- KBO
- ATP World Tour Masters 1000
- ATP World Tour 500
- ATP World Tour 250
- ATP World Tour Finals
- WTA Tour
