= Sergio Vargas (footballer, born 1980) =

Chilean footballer

Personal information
- Full name: Sergio Alex Vargas Pino
- Date of birth: 24 July 1980 (age 46)
- Place of birth: San Antonio, Chile
- Height: 1.75 m (5 ft 9 in)
- Position: Defensive midfielder

Senior career*
Years	Team	Apps	(Gls)
2001–2002	O'Higgins	0	(0)
2003	Deportes Linares	–	(–)
2004	Deportes Temuco	34	(1)
2005–2007	Cobreloa	32	(0)
2006	→ Everton (loan)	25	(0)
2007–2015	Deportes La Serena	208	(2)
Total		299	(3)
- * Club domestic league appearances and goals

Sergio Alex Vargas Pino (born 24 July 1980) is a Chilean former footballer who played as a defensive midfielder.
