= Rodrigo Goldberg =

Chilean footballer (born 1971)

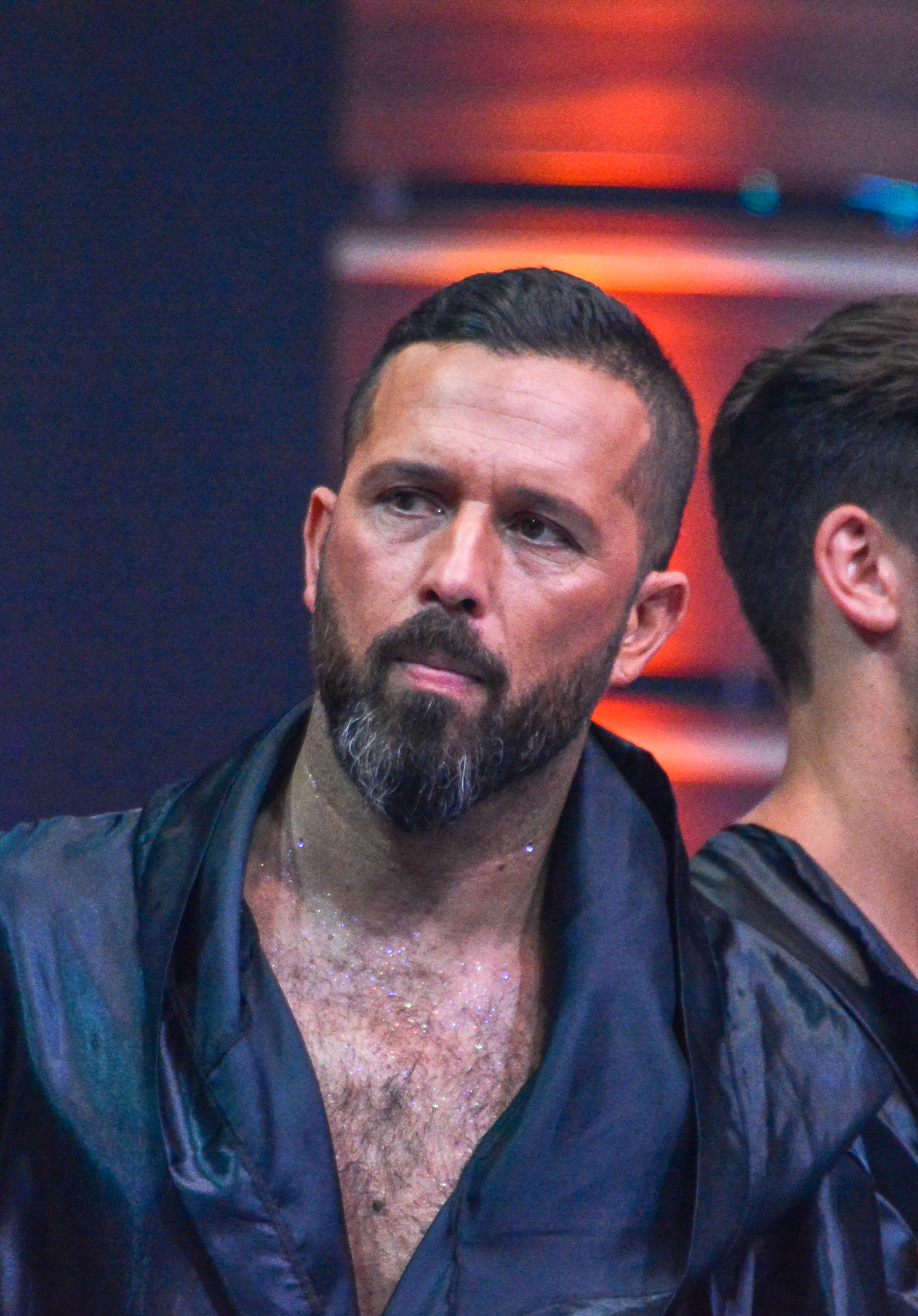
- Goldberg in 2017

Personal information
- Full name: Rodrigo Alejandro Goldberg Mierzejewski
- Date of birth: 9 August 1971 (age 55)
- Place of birth: Santiago, Chile
- Height: 1.76 m (5 ft 9 in)
- Position: Striker

Youth career
- Universidad de Chile

Senior career*
Years	Team	Apps	(Gls)
1989–1997	Universidad de Chile	67	(11)
1992–1993	→ Santiago Wanderers (loan)	61	(25)
1997–2003	Maccabi Tel Aviv	75	(28)
1998–1999	→ Universidad Católica (loan)	19	(5)
2005–2006	Santiago Morning	37	(6)
Total		259	(75)

International career
1995–2001	Chile	13	(4)

Managerial career
- 2019–2021: Universidad de Chile (sporting director)
- * Club domestic league appearances and goals

Rodrigo Alejandro Goldberg Mierzejewski (born 9 August 1971) is a Chilean former professional footballer who played as a striker. He gained national notoriety in Israel for his talented play with Maccabi Tel Aviv and good use of the Hebrew language. At the international level, he made 13 appearances for the Chile national team scoring 4 goals.

== Time in Israel ==
Goldberg was an integral part of the Maccabi Tel Aviv squad that took back to back cup titles and a league championship thereafter. He had a strained relationship with club captain Avi Nimni and verbally criticized him in the Israeli media before returning to Chile.

== Return to Chile ==
After playing for four seasons in Israel, Goldberg returned to Chile to play for Santiago Morning. During a club match against Palestino, he was subjected to anti-Semitic abuse from the opposition supporters because of his Polish and German Jewish background. Goldberg is, however, a Catholic, as a result of the conversion of his grandparents.

== After football ==
Goldberg graduated as an Industrial Civil Engineer at the San Sebastián University.

Since 2006, he has worked as a football commentator and analyst in both radio and TV media such as Canal del Fútbol, Fox Sports and Radio Cooperativa. In addition to this, he worked for TVN during the 2011 Copa América. Also, he has worked for print media such as Publimetro and La Tercera.

From 2019 to 2021, Goldberg worked as Sports Director of Universidad de Chile alongside his former fellow footballer Sergio Vargas.

== Honours ==
Universidad de Chile

- Primera División de Chile: 1994, 1995

Maccabi Tel Aviv

- Israel State Cup: 2001, 2002
- Israeli Premier League: 2002–03
