= Star Channel (Dutch TV channel) =

Dutch free-to-air television channel

- Country: Netherlands
- Broadcast area: Netherlands
- Headquarters: Amsterdam

Programming
- Language(s): Dutch
- Picture format: 1080i HDTV (downscaled to 16:9 576i for the SDTV feed)

Ownership
- Owner: Eredivisie Media & Marketing CV (51 % The Walt Disney Company (Benelux) BV)
- Sister channels: 24Kitchen; Disney Channel; Disney Jr. ESPN; National Geographic; National Geographic Wild

History
- Launched: 19 August 2013; 11 years ago
- Former names: Fox (2013–2023)

Links
- Website: www.starchannel.nl

Availability

Terrestrial
- Digitenne: Channel 26 (HD)

Streaming media
- Ziggo GO: ZiggoGO.tv (Europe only)

Star Channel (formerly known as Fox) is a Dutch free-to-cable television channel operated by Eredivisie Media & Marketing CV in which The Walt Disney Company (Benelux) BV has 51% ownership. The channel launched as Fox on 19 August 2013. A Fox-branded channel had previously been available in the Netherlands between 1998 and 2001, which has since been rebranded to Veronica. The channel has a line-up consisting of television series, sporting events and films.

== History ==
Final logo as Fox, used from 2019 to 2023

On 19 August 2013, the Fox channel was revived by Eredivisie Media & Marketing CV, in which Fox Networks Group Benelux (part of 21st Century Fox) holds 51%. Again series and films are being broadcast. But also Sports. The channel is a basic subscription channel that promoted the premium TV stations of Fox Sports Eredivisie. The channel name is written entirely by capital letters, as FOX. Sports highlights were broadcast on the channel. There was also a talk show on Friday (Fox Football), presented by Toine van Peperstraten with exclusive analyzes by Jan van Halst. Wessel van Diepen was the voice-over of the station at that time.

In August 2015, Fox lost the broadcasting rights of the Johan Cruyff Shield and the KNVB Cup, which meant that the channel would only broadcast films and series for three years. From August 2018, the broadcasting rights of the Johan Cruyff Shield and the KNVB Cup returned to Fox. Fox also received the broadcasting rights of the Eerste Divisie. Since 17 August 2018, Fox broadcasts sports programs from Fox Sports every Monday and Friday between 6 PM and 2 AM with switches between matches and summaries on Friday and one live match and summaries on Monday of the Eerste Divisie (the sports programming will only take place if there are actual live matches).

On 20 March 2019, The Walt Disney Company acquired 21st Century Fox, including Fox Networks Group Benelux.

On 1 November 2023, the channel was rebranded to Star Channel.

== Programming ==
=== Current programming ===
- 9-1-1: Lone Star
- American Horror Story
- Below Deck Sailing Yacht
- Call Me Mother
- Chicago Med
- Chicago P.D.
- Grey's Anatomy
- Hawaii Five-0
- Hot Yachts
- Laugh Out Loud
- Law & Order: Organized Crime
- La Fortuna
- Make You Laugh Out Loud
- Million Dollar Listing New York
- Nancy Drew
- The Night Shift
- Real Girlfriends in Paris
- Shark Tank
- Shipping Wars
- The Simpsons
- War of the Worlds

=== Former programming ===
- 'Til Death
- 9-1-1
- 11.22.63
- 1864
- American Pickers
- Ascension
- Atlanta
- A.D. The Bible Continues
- Being Human
- Best of Viral Videos
- Boston Legal
- BoJack Horseman
- Bones
- Boomtown
- The Bridge
- Bridge and Tunnel
- Chicago Fire
- Chucky
- Close Up
- Colony
- Cordon
- Da Vinci's Demons
- Deep State
- Diggstown
- Empire
- Endgame
- Episodes
- The Equalizer
- The Flash
- Flip This House
- From
- Garage Gold
- Girlfriends' Guide to Divorce
- The Goldbergs
- The Handmaid's Tale
- The Heavy Water War
- Hoarders
- Hospital Diaries
- The Hotel People
- House
- Hudson & Rex
- The Incredible Dr. Pol
- Intervention
- Jo
- Law & Order: Criminal Intent
- Let's Go Viral
- Leverage
- Low Winter Sun
- Marrying Millions
- Maurits & Mimoun Vragen Om Problemen
- Meet the Russians
- The Mentalist
- The Middle
- Mike & Molly
- Million Dollar Listing LA
- Minority Report
- NCIS: New Orleans
- The Net - Promised Land
- The New Adventures of Old Christine
- Ninja Warrior UK
- Obsessed
- Outcast
- Outsiders
- Party Down
- Prison Break
- Paranormal Caught on Camera
- Quantico
- Raising Hope
- Release the Hounds
- Ripper Street
- Rosewood
- Salem
- Scream Queens
- Second Chance
- Shades of Blue
- Sleepy Hollow
- Sons of Liberty
- Station 19
- Storage Wars
- The Strain
- The Team
- Touch
- Ultimate Airport Dubai
- Vermist
- Vikings
- The Walking Dead
- Wallander
- Wayward Pines
- Will & Grace
- The X-Files
- Zombie House Flipping
