= Damián Manusovich =

Argentinian association football player

Damian Manusovich
Personal information
- Full name: Damian Marcelo Manusovich
- Date of birth: 30 April 1973 (age 53)
- Place of birth: Argentina
- Position: Defender

Senior career*
| Years | Team | Apps | (Gls) |
| -1991 | Club Atlético Atlanta | 18 | (1) |
| 1991-1992 | Club Atlético Vélez Sarsfield | 2 | (0) |
| 1993-1999 | San Lorenzo de Almagro | 131 | (1) |
| 1999-2000 | CD Numancia | 0 | (0) |
| 2000-2002 | Elche CF | 43 | (0) |
- * Club domestic league appearances and goals

Damian Manusovich (born 30 April 1973 in Argentina) is an Argentine retired footballer.
