= Fox Sports & Entertainment =

Defunct Japanese television channel (2011–2020)

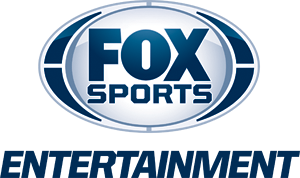
- Country: Japan
- Broadcast area: Japan
- Network: Fox Sports International

Programming
- Language: Japanese
- Picture format: 1080p HDTV

Ownership
- Owner: Fox Networks Group Japan (BS-Fox)
- Sister channels: Fox; Fox Movies; National Geographic; Nat Geo Wild; Baby TV

History
- Launched: 1 October 2011; 15 years ago
- Closed: 31 March 2020; 6 years ago
- Former names: Fox BS238 (2011–14)

Links
- Website: tv.foxjapan.com/fse/ (archived November 2019)

Fox Sports & Entertainment (formerly Fox BS238) was a Japanese general entertainment and sports television channel operated by BS-Fox, a subsidiary of Fox Networks Group Japan, which was owned by Walt Disney Direct-to-Consumer & International. Launched on 1 October 2011, it adopted last name on 1 February 2014.

The channel was mainly available on the DTH "broadcast satellite" (BS) television platform, but it has been made into other multichannel television platforms since.

FSE broadcast home games of Fukuoka SoftBank Hawks NPB baseball team (and previously those of Chiba Lotte Marines and Orix Buffaloes until the end of 2014 season), the English Premier League, FA Cup, German Bundesliga, Dutch Eredivisie and the Argentine Primera División football leagues, UFC, and FIS Alpine Ski World Cup.

Fox Sports Japan Inc., a joint venture between TV Bank (a subsidiary of SoftBank) and what was FIC Japan back then, previously supplied televised coverage of sporting events to the channel, but in December 2014, it was announced that the joint venture would be winded up, and that FIC Japan would subsequently oversee the production of sporting event coverages.

The channel also broadcast entertainment and lifestyle programming.

Due to the reorganization affected by Disney acquisition of 21st Century Fox, the channel closed on 31 March 2020 at 24:00 (UTC+09:00).
