= Fox Sports (Turkey) =

Former Turkish television channel

- Country: Turkey
- Broadcast area: Turkey, Cyprus, Greece and Malta
- Network: Fox Sports International
- Headquarters: Istanbul, Turkey

Programming
- Language: English
- Picture format: 1080i (HDTV) (downgraded to 16:9 576i for the SDTV)

Ownership
- Owner: Fox Networks Group (Walt Disney Direct-to-Consumer & International)

History
- Launched: 10 April 2007
- Closed: 1 March 2020

Fox Sports was a Turkish pay television channel owned by Fox Networks Group. It was launched on 10 April 2007 and broadcast live events such as NCAA, NFL, NHL, MLB, NASCAR and golf. The channel closed on 1 March 2020.

== Programming rights ==
=== American Football ===
- National Football League

=== Australian Rules Football ===
- Australian Football League

=== Baseball ===
- Major League Baseball

=== Basketball ===
- National Basketball Association
- National Collegiate Athletic Association

=== Golf ===
- PGA Tour

=== Hockey ===
- National Hockey League

=== Motorsports ===
- NASCAR

=== Rugby League ===
- National Rugby League

== See also ==
- Fox Sports International
- ESPN Holland
