= Salim Chartouni =

Mexican footballer (born 1973)

Personal information
- Full name: Nabih Salim Chartouni Kuri
- Date of birth: 20 December 1973 (age 52)
- Place of birth: Mexico City, Mexico
- Height: 1.78 m (5 ft 10 in)
- Position: Midfielder

Team information
- Current team: Héroes de Zaci (Manager)

Senior career*
Years	Team	Apps	(Gls)
1997–1999	Puebla	24	(1)

Managerial career
- 2021–: Héroes de Zaci
- * Club domestic league appearances and goals

Nabih Salim Chartouni Kuri (born 20 December 1973) is a Mexican former professional footballer who played as a midfielder. He played for Liga MX club Puebla from 1997 to 1999, and is currently a sports commentator for Fox Sports.
