= Fox Sports Eredivisie =

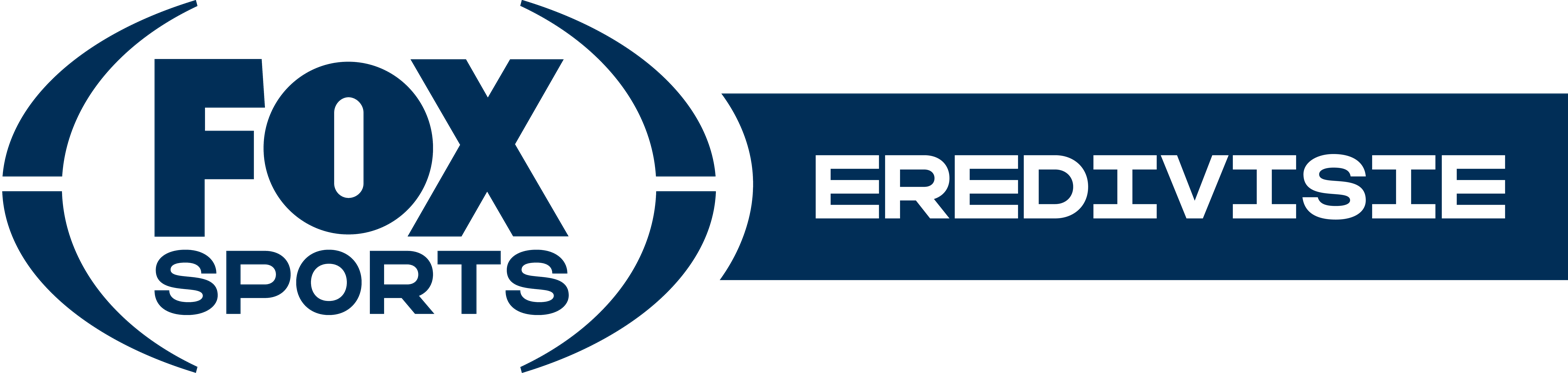
- Country: Netherlands
- Broadcast area: Netherlands
- Network: Fox Sports

Programming
- Language(s): Dutch
- Picture format: 1080i HDTV (downscaled to 16:9 576i for the SDTV feed)

Ownership
- Owner: Eredivisie Media & Marketing CV
- Sister channels: Fox Sports International; National Geographic; National Geographic Wild; Fox; 24Kitchen; BabyTV

History
- Launched: 29 August 2008; 16 years ago
- Closed: 31 December 2020; 4 years ago
- Replaced by: ESPN
- Former names: Eredivisie Live (2008-2013)

Links
- Website: www.foxsports.nl

Availability (at time of closure)

Terrestrial
- Digitenne: Channel 24 (Fox Sports 1 HD); Channel 25 (Fox Sports 2 HD)

Streaming media
- Ziggo GO: ZiggoGO.tv (Europe only)

Fox Sports Eredivisie was a Dutch premium television service owned by Eredivisie Media & Marketing CV in which Fox Networks Group Benelux (part of Fox) has 51% share. The football clubs (Eredivisie CV) together with Endemol own 49%. There were 3 channels available and all were part of the Fox Sports (Netherlands) premium network. Fox Sports Eredivisie held the exclusive rights for the live matches of the Eredivisie, the highest national football division.

== History ==
It launched as Eredivisie Live at the start of the 2008–09 season on 29 August 2008. Highlights of the Eredivisie can be seen on the national public broadcaster NOS.

The pundit team includes Jan van Halst, Mario Been and Pierre van Hooijdonk. Gary Lineker provides a weekly analysis of the matches, which can be seen on the website of Eredivisie Live. The website also offers pay-per-view matches.

Between the 2009–10 and 2012–13 seasons, Eredivisie Live broadcast the UEFA Europa League live on Thursdays. From 2013–14 the coverage switched to sister service Fox Sports International for matches of non-Dutch clubs.

The service rebranded into Fox Sports Eredivisie on 1 August 2013.

On 1 October 2020, it was announced that the networks would rebrand as ESPN on 31 December 2020, due to the acquisition of 21st Century Fox by Disney.

== Coverage ==
- Eredivisie All games live
- KNVB Cup All games live
- Keuken Kampioen Divisie Live Match on Friday(20.00) & Monday(20.00)
- UEFA Europa League: Games included with Dutch Teams live

== Channels ==
- Fox Sports 1
- Fox Sports 2
- Fox Sports 3
