= JTBC Sports =

- Country: South Korea
- Broadcast area: South Korea
- Headquarters: Seoul

Programming
- Language: Korean

Ownership
- Owner: JTBC

History
- Launched: 1 August 2015; 11 years ago
- Former names: JTBC3 Fox Sports (1 August 2015 – 10 March 2020); JTBC Golf&Sports (11 March 2020 – 2 February 2026)

Links
- Website: jtbcgolfnsports.joins.com

JTBC Sports is a South Korean cable TV sports channel. It was originally known as JTBC Golf&Sports until 2026 but due to Disney phasing out the Fox brand it was renamed.

== Programs ==
=== Current rights ===
==== Football ====
- FIFA World Cup (2026 and 2030)
- FIFA U-20 World Cup (2025-present)
- 2027 FIFA Women's World Cup
- K League 1

==== Golf ====
- LPGA
- KPGA Golf
- PGA Tour
- The Open Championship
- European Tour

=== Former rights ===
- AFC (2017-2020):
  - 2018 FIFA World Cup qualification – AFC third round (all 10 South Korea matches)
  - 2019 AFC Asian Cup
  - AFC U-23 Championship (2018 and 2020)
  - AFC Champions League
  - AFC Cup
  - AFC U-19 Championship
  - AFC U-19 Women's Championship
  - 2018 AFC Women's Asian Cup
  - AFC U-16 Women's Championship
  - AFC Men's Futsal Championship
  - AFC U-20 Men's Futsal Championship
  - AFC Women's Futsal Championship
- Bundesliga, 2. Bundesliga, DFL-Supercup (until 2019/20)
- EAFF E-1 Football Championship & EAFF E-1 Football Championship (women) (2015)
- A-League
- French Open
- Copa América (2019)
- Africa Cup of Nations (2019)
- Australian Open
- Wimbledon (until 2021)
- US Open (until 2021)
- ONE Championship
- Handball Korea League
- Olympic Games (2026 Winter Olympics) (Note: Originally, JTBC had their exclusive rights until 2032, however JTBC in November 2026 officially announces they terminated its broadcast rights agreement with the International Olympic Committee (IOC) due to severe financial distress, corporate rehabilitation proceedings, and the heavy economic burden of high rights fees combined with failed sub-licensing deals.)

== See also ==
- KBS N Sports
- MBC Sports+
- SBS Sports
- SPOTV
