= ESPN Africa =

African pay television channel

- Broadcast area: Sub-Saharan Africa
- Network: ESPN

Programming
- Language: English

Ownership
- Parent: ESPN, LLC; The Walt Disney Company Africa
- Sister channels: National Geographic; Nat Geo Wild; Disney Channel; Disney Jr.

History
- Launched: (1st cycle) June 1994; 32 years ago (relaunch) August 31, 2019; 7 years ago
- Former names: Fox Sports Africa (2014–2019)

Links
- Website: africa.espn.com

ESPN Africa (on-air name: ESPN) is an African pay television sports channel owned by ESPN, LLC, a joint venture between The Walt Disney Company (which owns a controlling 72% stake), the Hearst Communications (which owns 18%) and National Football League (owns the remaining 10%). The channel broadcasts in Sub-Saharan Africa in English.

== History ==
ESPN International began its service in Africa in June 1994. When ESPN launched the television channel, was available in 19 countries in sub-Saharan Africa. It's portfolio of broadcasts included NFL, MLB, NBA, NASCAR, UEFA Champions League, Spanish Primera League, Euroleague, NCAA Basketball and Football, among others.

In July 2013, ESPN announced that had decided to stop broadcasting across the Middle East and Africa at the end of the month. In a statement, the company said: “This was a strategic business decision made by ESPN,” the statement said. “At this point in time, ESPN will focus on its digital and content syndication businesses in the EMEA [Europe, the Middle East and Africa] region.”

On December 14, 2017, The Walt Disney Company announced its intent to acquire 21st Century Fox (21CF), including international assets. The deal was officially completed on March 19, 2019.

Fox International Channels had acquired Setanta Africa channels in November 2013, and in August 2014, rebranded Setanta Sports as Fox Sports and Setanta Action as Fox Sports 2. The channel traces its origins to a sports licensing company set up by South African sportscaster Barry Lambert, formerly of TVAfrica, as LIM Africa, later renamed Setanta Africa after a deal with Setanta gave them the rights to use the brand and created a localized African channel in August 2008. A second channel, Setanta Action, started in November 2012, airing other sports with particular emphasis on combat sports. Its programming mainly featured football from Ligue 1, Eredivisie, Scottish Premiership, Belgian Pro League and English Football League. The network was also a long-standing broadcaster of the South American competitions Copa Libertadores and Copa Sudamericana across Africa until the rights moved in 2017.

On August 7, 2019, six months after Disney acquired most of 21st Century Fox's assets, it was announced that the network would renamed as ESPN Africa on August 30. The website also were put under the ESPN brand. This marked the return of the brand to Sub-Saharan Africa after six years, as the former local ESPN feed and ESPN America both shut down on July 31, 2013.

On October 2, 2025, ESPN linear channels was added on Disney+ at no additional cost in South Africa.

== Programming ==
=== American Football ===
- National Football League
- College football

=== Australian Football ===
- Australian Football League
- AFL Women's

=== Baseball ===
- Major League Baseball
- World Baseball Classic
- College baseball
- Little League World Series

=== Basketball ===
- National Basketball Association
- FIBA Basketball World Cup
- FIBA Women's Basketball World Cup
- AfroBasket
- AfroBasket Women
- Basketball Africa League
- Women's National Basketball Association
- College basketball
- NBA Summer League
- NBA G League

=== Cricket ===
- Major League Cricket

=== Ice Hockey ===
- National Hockey League

=== Motor Sports ===
- DTM
- ADAC GT Masters
- Porsche Carrera Cup Germany

=== Multi-Sport Events ===
- Special Olympics World Games

=== Rugby union/league ===
- Top 14
- Japan Rugby League One
- Major League Rugby
- National Rugby League

=== Soccer ===
- UEFA Women's Champions League
- Eredivisie
- Süper Lig
- Scottish Premiership
- English Football League
- Saudi Pro League
- NWSL
- DFB-Pokal
- Scottish League Cup
- Saudi King's Cup
- Saudi Super Cup
- CONCACAF Champions Cup
