= Disney Jr. (Japan) =

Japanese children's pay TV channel

- Logo used since 1 November 2024
- Country: Japan
- Broadcast area: Nationwide
- Headquarters: Tokyo, Japan

Programming
- Languages: Japanese (dubbing; main); English (via SAP) (subtitles in Japanese)
- Picture format: HDTV 1080i; SDTV 480i

Ownership
- Owner: The Walt Disney Company (Japan) Ltd.
- Parent: Disney Kids & Family
- Sister channels: Disney Channel

History
- Launched: 1 October 2012; 13 years ago

Links
- Website: www.disney.co.jp/tv/junior

Disney Jr. (Japanese: ディズニージュニア, Hepburn: Dizunījunia) is a Japanese pay television channel and the Japanese equivalent of the American counterpart pay television channel, owned and operated by The Walt Disney Company Japan. Part of Disney Kids & Family, a subsidiary of Disney International Operations, it was launched on 1 October 2012 exclusively on SKY PerfecTV!.

== History ==
Disney Jr. was launched as morning block in Japan on 3 July 2011 replacing the Playhouse Disney morning block on Disney Channel, and was launched as an independent channel on 1 October 2012 exclusively on SKY PerfecTV!.

The programming lineup primarily consists of preschool TV shows of the brand, acquired series and local productions. The channel is positioned solely as "educational," meaning that almost all programs are categorized as "Hobbies/Education" on the EPG, regardless of their educational content (excluding programs moved from Disney Channel's regular block).

Some programs are organized into zones that separate broadcast times. Note that all time slots are in Japan (JST).

The channel in SKY Perfect! broadcast in standard definition (SD) at a wide 16:9 (1.78:1) screen size from October 1, 2012, to August 27, 2018, but switched to high definition on August 28 of the same year. In the premium service initially broadcast in SD, but switched to high definition on October 1, 2014.

== Branding ==
Disney Jr. in Japan kept the same logo and graphic package since its launch (as in the United States) until 1 November 2024 when it debuted its new logo and graphic package in line with its global counterparts.

== Logos ==
2003–2011

2024–present
