= Disney Channel (Japan) =

Japanese children's pay TV channel

- Logo used since October 1, 2025
- Country: Japan
- Broadcast area: Nationwide
- Headquarters: Tokyo, Japan

Programming
- Languages: Japanese (dubbing; main); English (via SAP) (subtitles in Japanese)
- Picture format: HDTV 1080i; SDTV 480i

Ownership
- Owner: The Walt Disney Company (Japan) Ltd.
- Parent: Disney Kids & Family
- Sister channels: Disney Jr.

History
- Launched: 18 November 2003; 22 years ago

Links
- Website: www.disney.co.jp/tv/dc

Availability

Terrestrial
- SKY PerfecTV!: Channel 256
- SKY PerfecTV! Premium Service: Channel 620
- J:COM: Channel 603
- eo Hikari TV: Channel 821

Disney Channel (Japanese: ディズニー・チャンネル, Hepburn: Dizunīchan'neru) is a Japanese children's pay television channel and the Japanese equivalent of the American counterpart pay television channel owned and operated by The Walt Disney Company Japan. Part of Disney Kids & Family, a subsidiary of Disney International Operations, it was launched on 18 November 2003 exclusively on SKY PerfecTV!.

== History ==
On 24 April 2003, The Walt Disney Company announced that Disney Channel would launch in Japan, following the 20th anniversary of Tokyo Disneyland. It took place on 18 November 2003 on SKY PerfecTV!, coinciding with the 75th anniversary of Mickey Mouse.

Disney held a countdown event at Tokyo Big Sight in Ariake on launch day, open to selected guests from the general public, VIP guests and celebrities, including president and director of operations Bob Iger, WDTV International president David Halbert, local administrative director Paul Candland and Japanese boy band Da Pump, who used the event to launch a new song, as well as performing a cover of Circle of Life, entirely in English. At 8pm, after airing one of Disney Channel's Wand IDs (featuring Mickey Mouse), actress Kumiko Mori made an opening announcement. Symbolically, the first program seen on the new channel was the 1928 short Steamboat Willie, which was followed by a message from John Lasseter and the premiere of the film Monsters, Inc.

On 8 July 2004, a VOD service was added to Hikari TV.

In the wake of the closure of the Asian and Korean versions on 1 October 2021, Disney announced that it would not close the Japanese version due to the channel being more popular in Japan than in Southeast Asia.

On April 7, 2025, the channel launched "Disney Channel Japan Anime" as programming block that shows other anime compilation differently.

== Logos ==
2003–2012

2012–2014

2014–2019

2019–February 2025

March–October 2025

October 2025–present
