= National Geographic (Dutch TV channel) =

- Country: Netherlands
- Broadcast area: Netherlands, Belgium

Programming
- Picture format: 1080i HDTV (downscaled to 16:9 576i for the SDTV feed)

Ownership
- Owner: The Walt Disney Company (Benelux) BV; The Walt Disney Company
- Sister channels: 24Kitchen; BabyTV; ESPN; National Geographic Wild; Star Channel

History
- Launched: 1 July 1998; 28 years ago
- Replaced: Super Channel (1987–1993); NBC Super Channel (1993–1996); NBC Europe (1996–1998)
- Former names: National Geographic Channel (1998–2016)

Links
- Website: nationalgeographic.nl

Availability

Terrestrial
- Digitenne: Channel 21 (HD)

Streaming media
- Ziggo GO: ZiggoGO.tv (Europe only)

National Geographic is a Dutch free-to-cable television channel that features documentaries produced by the National Geographic Society. It features some programming similar to that on the Discovery such as nature, science, culture, and history documentaries. The channel launched in the Netherlands in 1998 and initially time shared with CNBC Europe. It was later launched worldwide including in Asia and the United States. Today, the channel is available in over 145 countries, seen in more than 160 million homes and in 25 languages.

== History ==
National Geographic Channel launched in the Netherlands on 1 July 1998. It replaced NBC Europe, formerly known as NBC Super Channel and Super Channel. At the start National Geographic Channel time shared with CNBC Europe. In 2006 NBCUniversal sold its 25% shares to the News Corporation but it took three years before National Geographic Channel became a 24 hours channel. On 1 December 2009 CNBC Europe ceased airing in the mornings.

On 14 November 2016, National Geographic Channel was rebranded as National Geographic, dropping the "Channel" from its name.

On 20 March 2019 The Walt Disney Company acquired 21st Century Fox, including Fox Networks Group Benelux.

== National Geographic HD ==
National Geographic HD is available in the Netherlands. It launched through CanalDigitaal on 11 April 2006, two months later followed by UPC Netherlands on 8 June 2006. Originally the HD version was not a simulcast of the standard definition version of the National Geographic Channel, with some of the content coming from Rush HD, however from 1 September 2011 National Geographic Channel HD became a simulcast.

== See also ==
- National Geographic (magazine)
- National Geographic (American TV channel)
- National Geographic Society
