= Fox Sports (Chile) =

- Country: Chile
- Broadcast area: Chile
- Network: Fox Sports
- Headquarters: Providencia, Santiago

Programming
- Language: Spanish
- Picture format: 1080i (HDTV) (downscaled to 16:9 480i for the SDTV)

Ownership
- Owner: The Walt Disney Company Latin America; Fox Networks Group (Walt Disney Direct-to-Consumer and International)

History
- Launched: August 2013
- Replaced: Fox Sports Básico
- Closed: 15 December 2019

Links
- Website: http://www.foxsports.cl

Fox Sports was a Chilean pay television channel specialised on broadcasting sport events. The localised feed was launched in August 2013, replacing Fox Sports Básico.

== History ==
Fox Sports Latin America was available in Chile as two simulcast feeds, which were "Fox Sports Básico" and "Fox Sports Premium", inheriting the Panamerican Sports Network's (PSN) commercial structure in that country after its demise in 2001 as PSN's owner, "Hicks, Muse, Tate & Furst", formed a joint venture with Fox Sports International named Panamerican Sports Holding (PSH), which in turn formed a joint venture with Liberty Media and Argentine company Torneos y Competencias named "Fox Pan American Sports" that took control of the Latin American Fox Sports channels from News Corporation. Thus, Fox Sports southern feed broadcasting from Argentina started airing on PSN's slots.

At the time, Fox Sports Premium was the intact broadcast of the Latin American channel broadcasting from Argentina, while Fox Sports Básico was a simulcast with no live programming, relegated to low-tier television packages.

In August 2013, the channel was launched replacing Fox Sports Básico with original programming produced in Chile. In 21 October 2014, Fox Sports Premium stopped being a mirror feed of Fox Sports LA and starts rebroadcasting Fox Sports Chile programming with live events. 7 months later, on 4 May 2015, Fox Sports Premium was rebranded as Fox Sports 1.

Until December 2019, the Fox Sports channels were bundled into a premium pack labelled "Fox Sports Premium" which consisted on Chilean-made Fox Sports 1 and Latin American Fox Sports 2 and 3. It was the only country in the region to sell the network this way.

Due to the acquisition of 21st Century Fox by The Walt Disney Company, Disney took control of Fox Sports. As Disney already owned ESPN which broadcast 3 channels in Latin America, it announced to close Fox Sports' Chilean, Colombian, Uruguayan and Peruvian local feeds. Fox Sports Chile closed down on 15 December 2019, turning into a ESPN 4 feed with no live programming again.

== Programming rights ==
Events and competitions that were seen on Fox Sports Chile.

=== Football ===
- Copa Libertadores (Fox Sports 1)
- UEFA Champions League (Fox Sports 1)
- UEFA Europa League (Fox Sports 1)
- European Supercup
- Bundesliga (Fox Sports 1)

=== Motorsports ===
- Dakar Rally
- Formula One (Fox Sports 1)
- Rally Mobil

=== Gridiron football ===
- National Football League (Fox Sports 1)

== See also ==
- Fox Sports International
- Fox Sports (Latin American TV network)
