= ESPN4 =

Pay TV sports channel in Brazil

- Country: Brazil
- Network: ESPN International
- Headquarters: São Paulo

Programming
- Language(s): Portuguese
- Picture format: 1080i (HDTV) (downgraded to 16:9 480i for the SDTV)

Ownership
- Owner: The Walt Disney Company Latin America; Disney Branded Television (Disney International Operations)

History
- Launched: ESPN4: February 5, 2012; ESPN5: January 24, 2014
- Replaced: Speed
- Former names: Fox Sports (2012–2022); Fox Sports 2 (2014–2024)

Links
- Website: www.espn.com.br

ESPN4 is a Brazilian sports channel that was launched on 5 February 2012 as Fox Sports, replacing the Brazilian variant of Speed. A second channel, Fox Sports 2 was launched on 24 January 2014, which continues to use the Fox Sports name temporarily due to contractual obligations. On May 6, 2020 Brazil's antitrust regulator CADE announced that Fox Sports and ESPN Brasil could merge as part of the 21st Century Fox merger with Disney, with it remaining as-is until January 1, 2022 due to its broadcast rights and overall structure.

Fox Sports main channel was rebranded as ESPN4 in Brazil on 17 January 2022, becoming the fourth network among those of the domestic version of ESPN. Fox Sports 2 remained on-air in Brazil under that name until February 15, 2024 and was renamed ESPN5, due to contractual language with CONMEBOL regarding its coverage of the 2022 Copa Libertadores and the retirement of Fox Sports' brand in Latin America (including Brazil).

== Programming rights ==
=== Football ===
- Premier League
- EFL Championship
- EFL Cup
- La Liga
- DFB-Pokal
- Coupe de France
- Primeira Liga
- Eredivisie
- CONMEBOL Libertadores
- CONMEBOL Sudamericana
- CONCACAF Champions League
- UEFA Women's Euro
- AFC Asian Cup
- Asian Qualifiers: Road to 2026
- AFC Champions League Elite
- AFC Champions League Two
- AFC Challenge League
- AFC U-23 Asian Cup
- AFC U-20 Asian Cup
- AFC U-17 Asian Cup
- AFC Women's Asian Cup
- AFC U-20 Women's Asian Cup
- AFC U-17 Women's Asian Cup
- AFC Women's Olympic Qualifying Tournament
- AFC Women's Champions League
- Toulon Tournament
- Soccer Champions Tour
- Bola de Prata
- Florida Cup

=== American Football ===
- National Football League

=== Baseball ===
- Major League Baseball

=== Boxing ===
- ESPN Knockout

=== Motorsports ===
- Dakar Rally
- World Rally Championship
- FIA World Endurance Championship
- Extreme E
- TCR South America Touring Car Championship
- DTM
- IndyCar Series
- Indy NXT

== Programs broadcast by ESPN4 in Brazil ==
- Além da Bola
- Bola da Vez
- Especial Libertadores
- ESPN FC
- La Liga World
- Momento ESPN
- Mundo Premier League
- Resenha
- Show da Rodada: La Liga
- Show da Rodada: Premier League
- Show da Rodada: Serie A
- SportsCenter Abre o Jogo
- UEFA Nations League: Match Day Highlights
- UEFA Nations League: Match Night Highlights
- The Inside Line

== Staff ==
=== Play-by-play ===
- Camilla Garcia (Soccer and Basketball)
- Cledi Oliveira (Soccer)
- Eliane Trevisan (Soccer and Tennis)
- Hamilton Rodrigues (Soccer, Tennis and MotoGP)
- Luciana Marianno (Soccer)
- Matheus Pinheiro (Soccer and NFL)
- Matheus Suman (Basketball)
- Renan do Couto (Motorsports, Soccer and NFL)
- Rogério Vaughan (Soccer)
- Thiago Alves (Motorsports and MLB)

=== Color commentators ===
- Carlos Eugênio Simon (Soccer)
- Christian Fittipaldi (IndyCar Series)
- Edgard Mello Filho (Motorsports)
- Eugênio Leal (Soccer)
- Fausto Macieira (MotoGP)
- Gian Oddi (Soccer)
- Gustavo Zupak (Soccer)
- Juliana Tesser (MotoGP)
- Mauro Naves (Soccer)
- Mário Marra (Soccer)
- Osvaldo Pascoal (Soccer)
- Rafael Marques (Soccer)
- Raphael Prates (Soccer)
- Renata Ruel (Soccer)
- Renato Rodrigues (Soccer)
- Rodrigo Bueno (Soccer)
- Thiago Alves (Motorsports)
- Victor Martins (Motorsports)
- Ubiratan Leal (Soccer, MLB and NFL)
- Zinho (Soccer)
