= ESPN (Netherlands) =

Dutch group of pay television sports channels

- Country: Netherlands
- Broadcast area: Nationwide
- Network: ESPN
- Headquarters: Amsterdam, Netherlands

Programming
- Language: Dutch

Ownership
- Owner: ESPN, LLC operated by Eredivisie Media & Marketing CV (51 % The Walt Disney Company (Benelux) BV)
- Sister channels: 24Kitchen; BabyTV; National Geographic; National Geographic Wild; Star Channel

History
- Launched: 29 August 2008; 18 years ago as Eredivisie Live; 1 August 2013; 13 years ago as Fox Sports
- Former names: Fox Sports (2013–2020); Eredivisie Live (2008–2013)

Links
- Website: www.espn.nl

Availability

Terrestrial
- Digitenne: Channel 24 (ESPN HD); Channel 25 (ESPN 2 HD)

Streaming media
- Ziggo GO: ZiggoGO.tv (Europe only)
- ESPN Watch: Watch live (Netherlands only)
- Canal+: CANAL+ Sport (Netherlands only)

ESPN (Note: Previously known as Eredivisie Live (2008-2013) and Fox Sports (2013-2020)) is a Dutch group of pay television sports channels, owned by ESPN, LLC, a joint venture between the Walt Disney Company (which owns a controlling 80% stake) and the Hearst Communications (which owns the remaining 20%) and operated by Eredivisie Media & Marketing CV in which the Walt Disney Company (Benelux) BV has 51% ownership. ESPN launched as Fox Sports on 1 August 2013, buying out the Eredivisie Live service from the Dutch Football League. On 31 December 2020, it was renamed ESPN after the acquisition of 21st Century Fox by Disney in 2019. ESPN offers 4 HD channels and 1 Ultra HD channel, video-on-demand services and ESPN app. Its main competitor is the Dutch premium television service Ziggo Sport Totaal.

== History ==
It launched as Eredivisie Live at the start of the 2008–09 season on 29 August 2008. Highlights of the Eredivisie can be seen on the national public broadcaster NOS.

The pundit team includes Jan van Halst, Mario Been and Pierre van Hooijdonk. Gary Lineker provides a weekly analysis of the matches, which can be seen on the website of Eredivisie Live. The website also offers pay-per-view matches.

Between the 2009–10 and 2012–13 seasons, Eredivisie Live broadcast the UEFA Europa League live on Thursdays. From 2013–14 the coverage switched to sister service Fox Sports International for matches of non-Dutch clubs.

In August 2013, the Eredivisie Media & Marketing CV would establish another two channels which included Fox Sports International while Eredivisie Live was rebranded into Fox Sports Eredivisie on 1 August 2013.

On 20 March 2019 The Walt Disney Company acquired 21st Century Fox, including Fox Networks Group Benelux and Fox's 51% stake on the channel. Since July 2019, Fox Sports 1 is part of the KPN provider basic package. On 1 October 2020, it was announced that the networks would rebrand as ESPN on 31 December 2020, due to the acquisition of 21st Century Fox by Disney.

The number of linear television channels was reduced to 4 on 2 August 2021. ESPN Ultra HD launched on 2 August 2021, During the Johan Cruijff Schaal. This also was Evert ten Napel's last match as ESPN commentator.

On the 6th of February 2024 it was announced that for the first time by immediate effect all Keuken Kampioen Divisie and Vrouwen Eredivisie matches will be able to be watched live for ESPN Subscribers, With 2 Keuken Kampioen Divisie matches on Friday on linear TV and the rest only to be able to be watched online by ESPN Extra (which you can access only with ESPN Watch).

== Channels ==
- ESPN
- ESPN2
- ESPN3
- ESPN4
- ESPN Ultra HD
- ESPN Extra (only on ESPN Watch which is a digital app/website for subscribers)

== Coverage ==
=== Football ===
- Eredivisie: All games live
- KNVB Cup: All games live
- Keuken Kampioen Divisie: At least two live games per week with a switch program for all Friday games (Voetbal op Vrijdag) (All remaining games live on Friday on ESPN Extra which is on ESPN Watch)
- Vrouwen Eredivisie: All games live
- Johan Cruyff Shield
- UEFA Women's Champions League
- CONMEBOL
  - CONMEBOL Libertadores
  - CONMEBOL Sudamericana
  - CONMEBOL Recopa
- CONCACAF
  - CONCACAF Gold Cup
  - FIFA World Cup qualification
  - CONCACAF Nations League
  - CONCACAF Champions Cup
  - CONCACAF W Champions Cup
- AFC
  - AFC Asian Cup
  - AFC Women's Asian Cup
  - FIFA World Cup qualification
  - AFC Champions League Elite
  - AFC Champions League Two
- CAF
  - FIFA World Cup qualification

=== American football ===
- NFL
- NCAA College Football

=== Baseball ===
- MLB

=== Basketball ===
- NBA
- WNBA
- NCAA College Basketball

=== Ice hockey ===
- NHL

== See also ==
- Television in the Netherlands
- ESPN International
