= Devoe (name) =

Devoe or DeVoe is both a given name and surname. Notable people with the name include:

- Devoe Joseph (born 1989), Canadian basketball player
- Alexander Devoe (1905–1933), American movie producer
- Charles Devoe (1982–2010), American model
- Chuck DeVoe (1930–2013), American businessman and tennis player
- David DeVoe (born 1947), American businessman
- Don DeVoe (born 1941), American basketball coach
- Ellen DeVoe (BA 1986), American social work professor
- Emma Smith DeVoe (1848–1927), American suffragist
- Josh Devoe (1888–1979), American baseball player
- Lester DeVoe, American musician
- Michael Devoe (born 1999), American basketball player
- Ronnie DeVoe (born 1967), American singer
- Todd Devoe (born 1980), American football player
- Clifford DeVoe, supervillain appearing in American comic books published by DC Comics

== See also ==
- Vance DeVoe Brand (born 1931), American astronaut
- Garfield Devoe Rogers Sr., American philanthropist
