= NBC Sports Regional Networks =

Group of regional sports networks in the United States

- Country: United States
- Broadcast area: Nationwide (through regional affiliates)
- Affiliates: NBC Sports Radio (2012–2020)
- Headquarters: New York, New York

Programming
- Language: English
- Picture format: 1080i HDTV

Ownership
- Owner: NBCUniversal (Comcast)
- Parent: NBCUniversal News Group
- Sister channels: NBC; Universo

History
- Launched: October 1, 1997
- Replaced: Comcast SportsNet
- Former names: Comcast SportsNet (CSN) (1997–2017)

Links
- Website: www.nbcsports.com

NBC Sports Regional Networks is the collective name for a group of regional sports networks in the United States that are primarily owned and operated by the NBCUniversal division of the cable television company Comcast. The networks were originally established as Comcast SportsNet (CSN), a unit of Comcast's cable television business, beginning with a network in Philadelphia which launched in 1997. Their operations were aligned with the national NBC Sports division following the 2011 acquisition of NBCUniversal by Comcast. NBC Sports Regional Networks' business and master control operations are based in Englewood Cliffs, NJ.

The group operates four regional networks; Comcast also has a partial ownership interest in SportsNet New York, which is co-owned with Charter Communications and the New York Mets. Each of the networks carries regional broadcasts of sporting events from various professional, collegiate and high school sports teams (with broadcasts typically exclusive to each individual network, although some are shown on more than one network within a particular team's designated market area), along with regional and national sports discussion, documentary and analysis programs.

After their realignment with NBC Sports, the networks initially continued to operate primarily under the Comcast SportsNet name. Although Comcast originally considered dropping its name from the networks in favor of NBC Sports following the merger, they still operated under the CSN brand for at least six more years. The group's two networks in California were then re-branded under the NBC Sports brand in April 2017, while the remaining networks were renamed on October 2, 2017.

Since 2021, three of the seven NBC Sports branded networks (Northwest, Washington and Chicago) were either closed or sold as part of the transformation of the regional media rights market.

Beginning in 2025, all feeds have been available via sister streaming service Peacock as add-on features.

== History ==
=== As Comcast SportsNet/CSN (1997–2017) ===
==== Origins ====
The origins of Comcast SportsNet are traced to Comcast's March 19, 1996 purchase of a 66% interest in Spectacor and its primary assets – the Philadelphia Flyers, The Spectrum and the then-recently completed CoreStates Center – for $240 million and the assumption of a collective $170 million in debt; the new Comcast Spectacor (which appointed the company's previous majority owner, Edward M. Snider, as its chairman) also immediately purchased a 66% interest in the Philadelphia 76ers.

Immediately after the purchase was announced, there was speculation that Comcast would let Spectacor's television contracts with two local premium services that had long been carrying their games – PRISM (which carried movies and specials, in addition to sports events) and the all-sports network SportsChannel Philadelphia (both owned by Rainbow Media) – run out and create a sports network of its own, buy the existing networks or reach a complex deal with Rainbow to have PRISM and SportsChannel Philadelphia retain the broadcast rights to the 76ers and Flyers. Comcast immediately approached the Philadelphia Phillies – whose contract with PRISM and Sports Channel Philadelphia ended after the 1997 season – about entering into a broadcast deal, indicating it would launch an RSN.

After short-lived discussions between Rainbow Media and Comcast about the latter possibly becoming a part-owner in PRISM and SportsChannel Philadelphia, on April 25, 1996, Comcast Spectacor formally announced plans to create a new Philadelphia-centric basic cable channel, which would carry sports events from the Flyers (whose contract with PRISM and SportsChannel was set to end that fall and was extended by one year on October 4, 1996, the day before its season home opener, after strained contract negotiations) and the Phillies. On July 21, 1997, Comcast acquired the local television rights to the Philadelphia 76ers, with the team opting out of its contract with PRISM and SportsChannel that was set to run until the 1999–2000 season.

The launch of the new network, Comcast SportsNet Philadelphia, effectively shuttered PRISM and SportsChannel Philadelphia when it launched on October 1, 1997, with the network directly replacing the latter on Philadelphia area local cable systems.

==== Expansion into other markets ====
CSN began to expand with a series of acquisitions and new establishments: on July 11, 2000, Comcast acquired a 75% majority interest in Washington/Baltimore-area regional sports network Home Team Sports and Minneapolis-based network Midwest Sports Channel from Viacom for approximately $150 million. Minority owner News Corporation, which wanted to acquire full ownership of both networks to make them part of its Fox Sports Net group, sued Comcast and Viacom on July 21 in an attempt to block the sale.

On September 7, 2000, as part of a settlement between the two companies, Comcast traded its equity interest in Midwest Sports Channel to News Corporation in exchange for sole ownership of Home Team Sports. HTS was later relaunched as Comcast SportsNet Mid-Atlantic on April 4, 2001.

On October 1, 2004, Comcast SportsNet Chicago was launched to replace FSN Chicago, as the local teams wanted to have editorial control over their broadcasts. Also in October 2004, Comcast SportsNet West was launched conjunction with Maloof Sports & Entertainment, owners of the Sacramento Kings. The channel was renamed Comcast SportsNet California in 2008.

On April 30, 2007, Cablevision Systems Corporation sold its 50% ownership interests in FSN Bay Area and FSN New England to Comcast for $570 million (the San Francisco Giants were added as a partner in FSN Bay Area, when the team acquired a 30% stake in the network on December 10); subsequently, FSN New England rebranded as Comcast SportsNet New England in July 2007, while FSN Bay Area was rebranded as Comcast SportsNet Bay Area on March 31 of that year.

==== Integration with NBC Sports ====
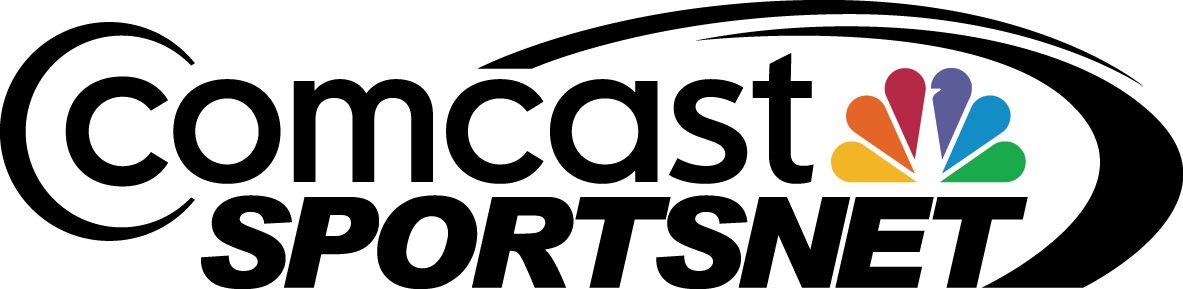
The logo using the full "Comcast SportsNet" name, used from 2012 to 2015; the logo minus the NBC peacock was first introduced in 2008.

As the result of the acquisition of NBC Universal by Comcast in February 2011, the operations of CSN, along with sister national sports networks Versus and Golf Channel, were integrated into the NBC Sports division. CSN adopted the new NBC Sports branding that was launched in January 2012 alongside the relaunch of Versus as NBC Sports Network. While there were plans for the channels to also take on the NBC branding at this time, they were scrapped in favor of maintaining the Comcast SportsNet name.

In April 2012, NBC Owned Television Stations took over responsibilities of selling national advertising on behalf of four CSN networks (New England, Mid-Atlantic, Northwest, and Philadelphia). For "unwired sales", the Group will be continue to be represented by Home Team Sports. The arrangement is an extension of one that it had established with New England Cable News in 2011.

In early 2012, Comcast signed a contract worth $1 billion with the Houston Astros and Houston Rockets, which formed a new joint venture in which the two teams would own a 77.307% ownership interest in a new Houston-based sports network (with Comcast holding the remaining 22.693% interest); Comcast SportsNet Houston launched on October 1, 2012, assuming the rights to the Rockets and Astros from Fox Sports Houston, which shut down three days later. After filing an involuntary Chapter 11 bankruptcy petition for the network on September 27, 2013, to "resolve structural issues affecting CSN Houston's partnership," DirecTV Sports Networks and AT&T acquired Comcast SportsNet Houston on August 6, 2014, as part of a reorganization plan (with DirecTV as majority owner at 60%). The network was then integrated into DirecTV-operated Root Sports group, which relaunched it as Root Sports Southwest on November 14, 2014.

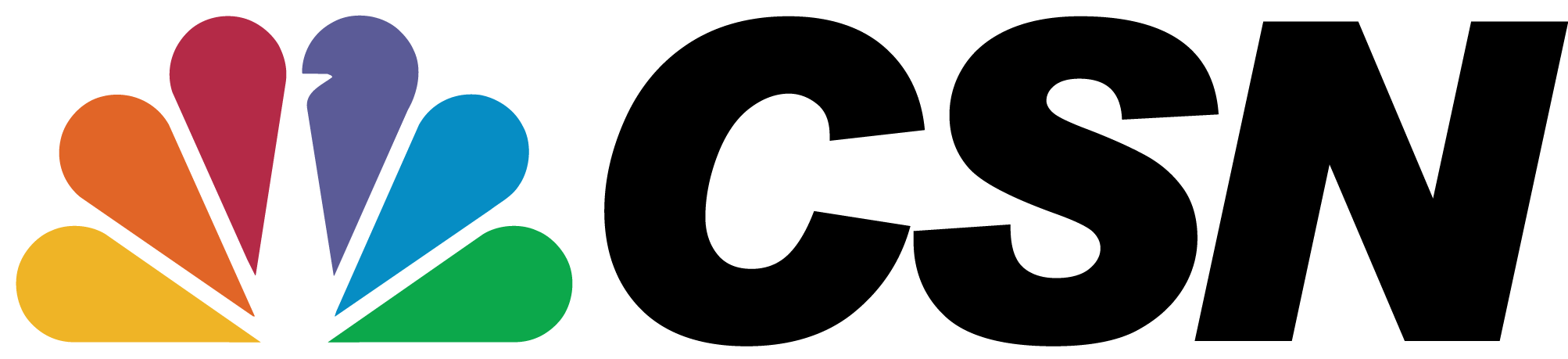
CSN branding for NBC Sports Regional Networks, in place from 2015 to 2017.

In markets that didn't have an affiliate of that group, Comcast SportsNet also carried national programming distributed by competing regional sports network chain FSN (which included various college sports and UEFA Champions League soccer), a relationship that traced back to the launch of Comcast SportsNet Philadelphia (which took over the FSN programming rights from SportsChannel Philadelphia). CSN quietly dropped all FSN-supplied programming on August 1, 2012, after failing to reach an agreement to continue carrying FSN's nationally distributed programs.

=== As NBC Sports (2017–present) ===
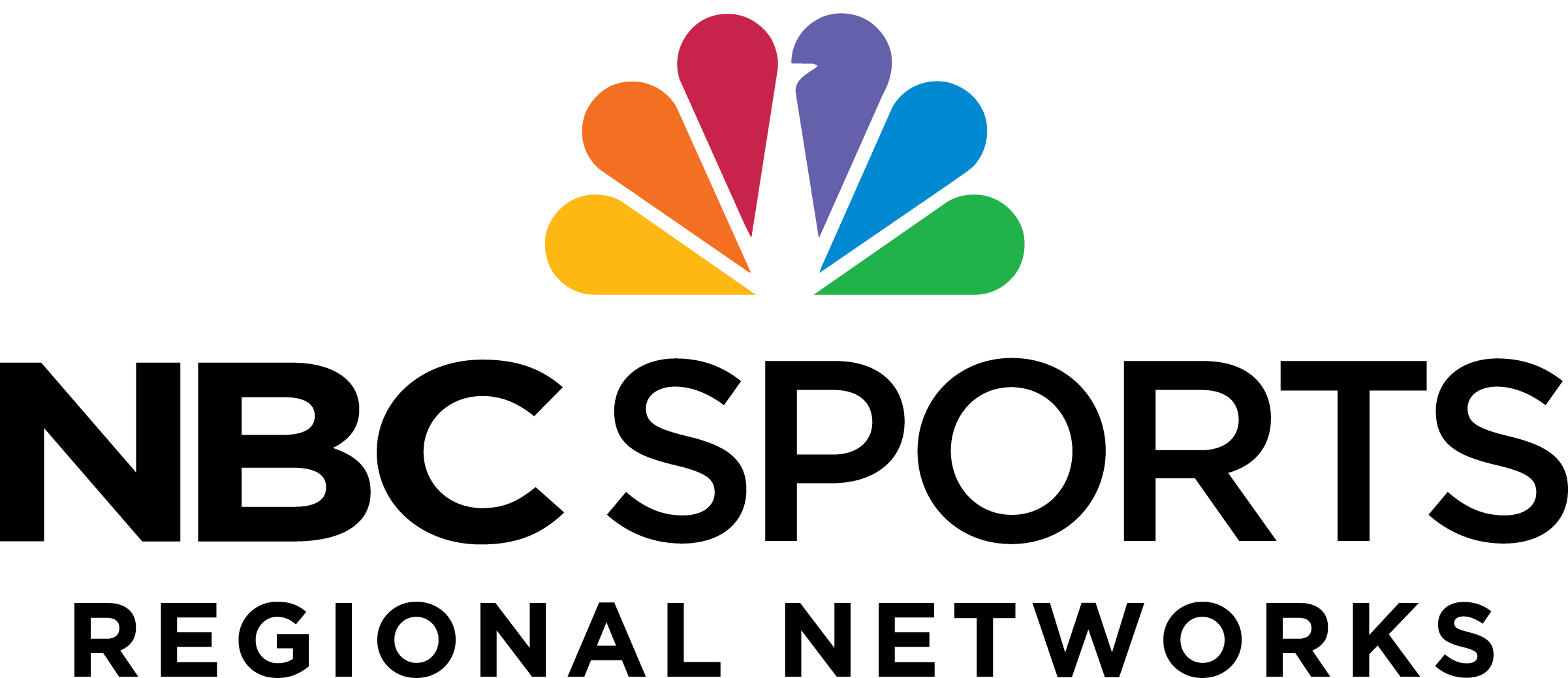
NBC Sports Regional Networks logo, used from 2017 to 2023

On March 22, 2017, the division announced that it would rebrand CSN Bay Area and CSN California to NBC Sports Bay Area and NBC Sports California on April 2, 2017, coinciding with the start of the 2017 Major League Baseball season. Division president David Preschlack stated that the re-branding was meant to "better associate the prestigious NBC Sports legacy with the strength of our Comcast Sports Networks' local sports coverage in Northern California." On August 22, 2017, it was announced that the other networks, besides SNY, would migrate to the NBC Sports name. In some regions, the name of the network was narrowed, with CSN Mid-Atlantic renamed "NBC Sports Washington", and CSN New England renamed "NBC Sports Boston". In addition, The Comcast Network channels were also rebranded, with TCN Mid-Atlantic becoming NBC Sports Washington Plus, and TCN Philadelphia becoming NBC Sports Philadelphia Plus. The rebranding took effect on October 2, 2017, coinciding with the start of the 2017–18 NHL and NBA seasons.

==== Sales and closures ====
In June 2021, NBC lost the contract to the Portland Trail Blazers. They subsequently shut down NBC Sports Northwest in fall 2021. NBC reportedly explored selling the remaining networks or converting them to streaming services, with Sinclair Broadcast Group being cited as a likely bidder. A sale to Sinclair would see the networks' integration with Sinclair-owned Bally Sports (the former Fox Sports Networks) as well as possibly Stadium.

In August 2022, NBCUniversal announced it would sell NBC Sports Washington to Capitals and Wizards owner Monumental Sports & Entertainment, which already owned a minority stake; NBC Sports Washington was relaunched as the Monumental Sports Network in September 2023 after Monumental Sports & Entertainment acquired full control of the network. Sports Business Journal reported that the transaction was a "one-off" due to Monumental being an "aggressive and willing" buyer, and that Comcast had no plans to sell off its other regional sports networks.

NBC Sports Chicago shut down operations on September 30, 2024 after NBCUniversal's partners in the network, owners of the Chicago Blackhawks, Chicago Bulls and Chicago White Sox did not renew rights. The teams established a new channel, Chicago Sports Network (CHSN) with Standard Media Group to broadcast their games instead. Four years earlier, the Chicago Cubs also left NBC Sports Chicago and launched the Marquee Sports Network.

Meanwhile, the remaining NBC RSNs began to deploy new on-air presentation that month, which was adapted from the new college football graphics that NBC debuted in 2023, and marked a transition to a cloud-based workflow using Ross Video systems.

==== Peacock integration ====
Beginning in 2025, NBC RSNs have been available via sister streaming service Peacock as add-on features.

== Channels ==
=== Owned-and-operated outlets ===
| Channel | Region served | Team rights | Year established | Formerly operated as | Notes |
SportsNets
| NBC Sports Bay Area | San Francisco Bay Area; Northern and central California parts of Southern Oregon northwestern Nevada (including the Lake Tahoe–Reno–Carson City region) | San Francisco Giants (MLB); Golden State Warriors (NBA) San Francisco 49ers (NFL) (team-related programs only); local coverage of the West Coast Conference (NCAA) | 2008 | Pacific Sports Network (1989–91); SportsChannel Bay Area (1990–91); SportsChannel Pacific (1991–98); Fox Sports Bay Area (1998–2000); Fox Sports Net Bay Area (2000–04); FSN Bay Area (2004–08); Comcast SportsNet Bay Area (2008–2017) | Owned as a joint venture between CSN Bay Area Holdings (the NBC Sports Group and San Francisco Giants). Comcast acquired a majority interest in the network from Cablevision in April 2007. While previously branded as an FSN affiliate, it switched to the Comcast SportsNet branding in March 2008. |
| NBC Sports Boston | Massachusetts eastern and central Connecticut (except Fairfield County); Vermont; Maine; New Hampshire; Rhode Island | Boston Celtics (NBA); Maine Celtics (NBA G League); New England Free Jacks(MLR); New Hampshire Wildcats (NCAA); Connecticut Sun (WNBA) | 2007 | PRISM New England (1981–1983); SportsChannel New England (1983–1998); Fox Sports New England (1998–2000); Fox Sports Net New England (2000–2004); FSN New England (2004–2007); Comcast SportsNet New England (2007–2017) | Comcast acquired a majority share from Cablevision in April 2007. The network was renamed Comcast SportsNet New England in October 2007. |
| NBC Sports California | San Francisco Bay Area; Northern and central California parts of Oregon parts of Nevada | Athletics (MLB); Sacramento Kings (NBA); San Jose Sharks (NHL); NCAA sports: San Francisco Dons; Santa Clara Broncos; Saint Mary's Gaels; UC Davis Aggies; Pacific Tigers | 2004 | Comcast SportsNet West (2004–2008); Comcast SportsNet California (2008–2017) | Created in conjunction with Maloof Sports & Entertainment, owners of the Sacramento Kings and Sacramento Monarchs, after the company opted not to renew its previous contract with FSN Bay Area. Originally launching as Comcast SportsNet West, the channel was renamed Comcast SportsNet California on September 4, 2008. |
| NBC Sports Philadelphia | Philadelphia metropolitan area eastern Pennsylvania southern and central New Jersey; Delaware | Philadelphia Phillies (MLB); Philadelphia 76ers (NBA); Philadelphia Flyers (NHL); Philadelphia Eagles (NFL) (team-related programs only); Philadelphia Big 5 basketball (NCAA); Atlantic 10 Conference football and basketball (NCAA); Colonial Athletic Association(NCAA) | 1997 | Comcast SportsNet Philadelphia | Owned by NBC Sports Group (75%) and the Philadelphia Phillies (25%). The flagship of the Comcast regional sports networks, it was the first Comcast SportsNet channel to launch, effectively replacing SportsChannel Philadelphia and PRISM in 1997, and (through its ownership by Phillies and Flyers parent Comcast Spectacor) was a pioneer in team-owned sports networks. |
Other networks
| SportsNet New York (SNY) | New York metropolitan area New York state Connecticut northern and central New Jersey northeastern Pennsylvania | New York Mets (MLB); New York Jets (NFL) (team-related programs only); Big East Conference sports (NCAA); Ivy League sports (NCAA); University of Connecticut Huskies sports (NCAA) | 2006 | | Owned by the Sterling Entertainment Enterprises; New York Mets (65%), Charter Communications (27%) and NBC Sports Group (8%). |

=== Former networks ===
| Channel | Region served | Team rights | Formerly operated as | Tenure with CSN | Notes |
|---|---|---|---|---|---|
| Comcast/Charter Sports Southeast | Alabama, Georgia, Mississippi, Tennessee and South Carolina | Atlanta Dream (WNBA); Southeastern Conference and Atlantic Coast Conference sports (NCAA); Atlanta Braves (MLB; WPCH-TV simulcast) | Sun Belt Network (1999–2004) | 1999–2014 | Launched as a joint venture with Charter Communications; available only on cable providers, CSS primarily carried collegiate and high school sporting events (especially the Southeastern Conference, though few actual live SEC football or basketball games were carried by the network), and it was de facto superseded by ESPN's SEC Network. Although it never used the Comcast SportsNet brand, CSS was treated as a sister network to the CSN outlets. |
| Comcast SportsNet Houston | Texas, Louisiana, Arkansas, Oklahoma and New Mexico | Houston Rockets (NBA); Houston Astros (MLB); Houston Dynamo (MLS) regional college football and basketball | | 2012–2014 | DirecTV and AT&T acquired Comcast SportsNet Houston in November 2014, rebranding it as part of DirecTV's Root Sports group as Root Sports Southwest (Later renamed as AT&T SportsNet Southwest in July 2017); the network reached 40% of cable television homes in the Houston market prior to the network's bankruptcy and sale. |
| Comcast Sports Southwest | Houston area | Select games from Sun Belt Conference, Southeastern Conference, and Conference USA (particularly those of the University of Houston and Rice University; all NCAA) | | 2009–2012 | The network shut down in October 2012, following the launch of Comcast SportsNet Houston. The network carried events from the Houston Cougars and Rice Owls as well as Houston-area high school sports. |
| MountainWest Sports Network (The Mtn.) | National (based in Denver, Colorado) | Air Force Falcons (NCAA); Boise State Broncos (NCAA); Colorado State Rams (NCAA); New Mexico Lobos (NCAA); SDSU Aztecs (NCAA); TCU Horned Frogs (NCAA); UNLV Rebels (NCAA); Wyoming Cowboys (NCAA) | | 2006–2012 | Launched on September 1, 2006, as a joint venture between the Mountain West Conference, CBS Sports (through the former CSTV) and Comcast. The network was shut down on June 1, 2012, as a result of the Mountain West Conference's team realignment. |
| NBC Sports Chicago | Chicago metropolitan area northern and central Illinois, Indiana (except areas near Cincinnati, Evansville and Louisville), Iowa, non-Milwaukee market areas of southern Wisconsin | Chicago White Sox (MLB); Chicago Blackhawks (NHL); Chicago Bulls (NBA); Chicago Sky (WNBA); Northern Illinois Huskies football (NCAA); Illinois State Redbirds basketball (NCAA) | Comcast SportsNet Chicago | 2004-2024 | Owned by Comcast subsidiary NBCUniversal (25%), Chicago Bulls and White Sox owner Jerry Reinsdorf (50%), and Chicago Blackhawks owner Rocky Wirtz (25%). Created in conjunction with the above teams (plus the Chicago Cubs), in order to effectively replace FSN Chicago. Ceased operations on September 30 2024, because the teams established Chicago Sports Network as a replacement. |
| NBC Sports Northwest | Washington; Oregon; Alaska | Portland Trail Blazers (NBA); Portland Winterhawks (WHL); Vancouver Canucks (NHL) (through Sportsnet Pacific); Tacoma Rainiers (PCL); University of Oregon Ducks sports (NCAA) | Comcast SportsNet Northwest | 2007–2021 | Created in conjunction with the Trail Blazers after the team was unable to reach an agreement to keep its game broadcasts on FSN Northwest (now Root Sports Northwest). The network was available mainly on Comcast systems, and was not carried by Dish Network nor DirecTV. Canby Telcom accused Comcast of being inflexible in carriage negotiations for the network pertaining to its subscriber rates, with The Oregonian reporting that CSN Northwest was seeking a rate of $2 per month per subscriber, more than what was being paid to the established FSN Northwest. The network shut down at the end of the broadcast day on September 30, 2021. |
| The Comcast Network | Mid-Atlantic states southern Pennsylvania | Eastern League baseball Colonial Athletic Association football (NCAA) | CN8 (1996–2009) | 1996–2017 | Based in Philadelphia and the Baltimore–Washington metropolitan area. The networks were carried on most Comcast systems along the East Coast (from Philadelphia to Richmond, Virginia), and also carried on other cable providers. The networks served primarily as local news/information channels, but carried some regional sports programming, including Eastern League baseball and CAA football, as well as select Phillies games within that team's designated market. Originally expanded into the Boston market, the New England operations ceased in 2009. The Philadelphia and Washington networks were replaced with Plus feeds of NBC Sports Philadelphia and NBC Sports Washington, respectively. |
| NBC Sports Washington | Maryland; Virginia; Washington, D.C. southern Pennsylvania eastern West Virginia southern Delaware; Hampton Roads; Outer Banks | Washington Capitals (NHL); Washington Wizards (NBA); Washington Commanders (NFL) (preseason games only); Washington Mystics (WNBA); Chesapeake Bayhawks (MLL); Atlantic Coast Conference football and basketball (NCAA); Colonial Athletic Association sports (NCAA) | Home Team Sports (1984–2001); Comcast SportsNet Mid-Atlantic (2001–2017) | 2001–2023 | Comcast SportsNet Mid-Atlantic carried the Baltimore Orioles until 2006, when it lost the rights to the team-owned Mid-Atlantic Sports Network. Monumental Sports & Entertainment, parent company of the Wizards and Capitals, which has held a minority equity interest in the network since 2016, acquired the network outright in September 2022. The network rebranded as the Monumental Sports Network on September 20, 2023. |

=== Other channels ===
New England Cable News, a regional news channel owned by Comcast, was operated as a part of Comcast Sports Group and CSN prior to Comcast's purchase of NBC Universal. In July 2013, as part of a corporate reorganization, NECN had its operations transferred to NBC Owned Television Stations (the unit of NBCUniversal Television Group responsible for running NBC and Telemundo's owned-and-operated stations), and eventually became the journalistic foundation of NBC's new Boston O&O, WBTS-LD (since relocated to WBTS-CD), in January 2017.

Comcast also owned Comcast Local (CL), a Detroit-based sports network that was distributed throughout Michigan and central Indiana. The network provided coverage of local collegiate and high school sports events, as well as minor league sports throughout its broadcast area. Comcast Local ceased operations in February 2008, as every major professional or college team in the region had its programming tied to FSN Detroit and/or the Big Ten Network.

== Related services ==
=== Overflow feeds ===
Most NBC Sports Regional Networks maintain a second feed with its own schedules of programming – under the Plus brand (with the network's regional name suffixed preceding the "Plus" title) to be able to simultaneously broadcast two events involving teams the respective network holds the broadcast rights to carry. For example, NBC Sports Philadelphia uses NBC Sports Philadelphia Plus as its sister channel.

=== High definition ===
Regional channels (and in some cases, their "Plus") is offered in standard-definition and high-definition feed. NBC Sports Northwest currently does not maintain a high-definition simulcast in the Seattle market.

== National programs ==
=== Programming strategy ===
Each of the NBC Sports regional network outlets have acquired the play-by-play broadcast rights to major sports teams in their regional market (exempting NFL regular season or playoff games, since the league's contracts require all games to be aired on broadcast television in each participating team's local markets). In addition to local play-by-play coverage, the NBC Sports networks also produce and broadcast pre-game and post-game shows, and broadcasts weekly "magazine" shows centered on the teams that maintain rights with the individual network. In some markets, NBC Sports competes directly with other regional sports networks for the broadcast rights to team-specific programming.

=== National sports programming ===
==== Live national play-by-play ====
- Premier League select games
- Notre Dame hockey select games
- Atlantic 10 basketball select games

==== Other sports ====
- NASCAR Sprint Cup Series & NASCAR Xfinity Series live practice & qualifying coverage when NBCSN & CNBC are unable to broadcast due to other programming. Started in 2015.

== See also ==
- NBC Sports
- Broadcasting of sports events
