= News Corporation =

American multinational mass media company (1980–2013)

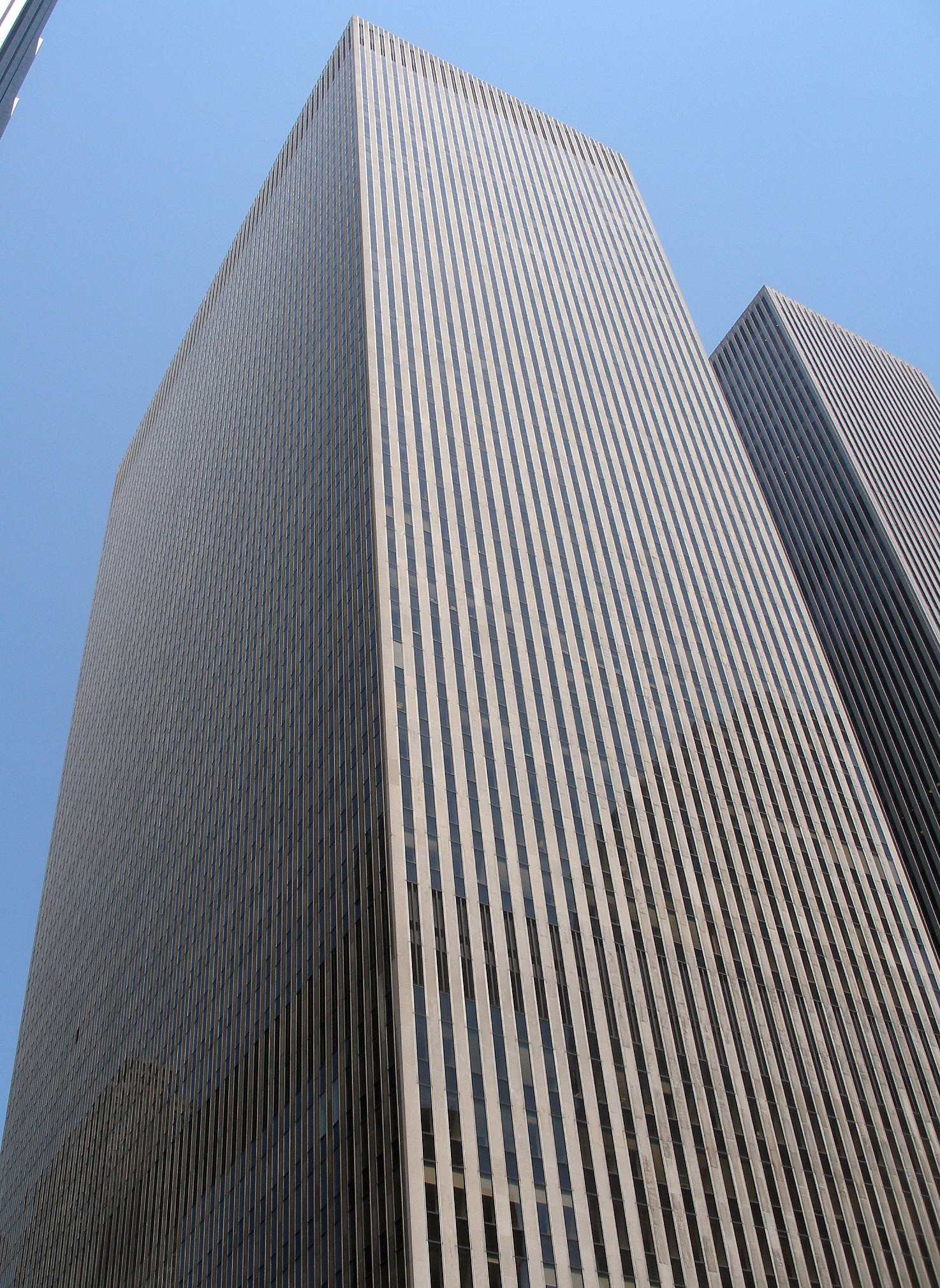
- 1211 Avenue of the Americas, the final headquarters of News Corporation in New York City
- Formerly: The News Corporation Limited (1980–2004)
- Type: Public
- Traded as: NYSE: NWSA (Class A, 1986-2008); NYSE: NWS (Class B, 1986-2008); Nasdaq: NWSA (Class A, 2008–2013); Nasdaq: NWS (Class B, 2008-2013); ASX: NWSLV (Class A); ASX: NWS (Class B)
- Industry: Mass media
- Predecessor: TCF Holdings
- Founded: March 15, 1980; 46 years ago in Adelaide, South Australia (as News Corp Limited); December 12, 2004; 21 years ago in Wilmington, Delaware, U.S. (as News Corporation)
- Founder: Rupert Murdoch
- Defunct: June 28, 2013; 13 years ago
- Fate: Split into 21st Century Fox and News Corp
- Successors: 21st Century Fox (until 2019); News Corp
- Headquarters: 1211 Avenue of the Americas, New York City, U.S.
- Area served: Worldwide
- Key people: Rupert Murdoch (chairman and CEO); Chase Carey (president & COO)
- Products: Cable network programming, Filmed entertainment, Television, direct-broadcast satellite television, Publishing, and other
- Owner: Murdoch family (39% voting power)
- Divisions: Fox Entertainment Group; Fox Networks Group
- Subsidiaries: To see most of the company's subsidiaries, see: List of assets owned by News Corp; List of assets owned by Fox Corporation
- Website: newscorp.com

The original incarnation of News Corporation (abbreviated News Corp. and previously known as The News Corporation Limited until 2004) was an American multinational mass media corporation founded and controlled by media mogul Rupert Murdoch. Founded on March 15, 1980 as News Corp Limited and formerly incorporated in Adelaide, South Australia, the company was re-incorporated under Delaware General Corporation Law following a successful shareholder vote on November 12, 2004; it had since been headquartered at 1211 Avenue of the Americas in New York City.

On June 28, 2012, after concerns from shareholders in response to its recent controversies and to "unlock even greater long-term shareholder value", Rupert Murdoch announced that News Corporation's assets would be restructured into two publicly traded companies, one oriented towards media, and the other towards publishing. The formal split was completed on June 28, 2013; the original News Corp. was renamed 21st Century Fox and consisted primarily of media outlets, while the new News Corp was formed to take on the publishing and Australian broadcasting assets.

Its major holdings at the time of the split were News Limited (a group of newspaper publishers in Murdoch's native Australia), News International (a newspaper publisher in the United Kingdom, whose properties include The Times, The Sun, and the now-defunct News of the World (the subject of a phone hacking scandal that led to its closure in July 2011), Dow Jones & Company (an American publisher of financial news outlets, including The Wall Street Journal), the book publisher HarperCollins, and the Fox Entertainment Group (the holding for the 20th Century Fox Film Corporation and the Fox Broadcasting Company). Prior to its split, it was the world's largest media company in terms of total assets and the world's fourth largest media group in terms of revenue, dominating the news, television, film, and print industries.

== History ==
Evolution of News Corp
- 1952: Rupert Murdoch inherited the News tabloid from his father and used it to develop a media conglomerate
- 1954: After acquiring News Limited, Murdoch purchased and established dozens of newspapers throughout Australia
- 1960s: News Limited began to expand globally and bought out several British tabloids like The Sun and News of the World
- 1980: To manage its growing operations, News Corporation was incorporated as the holding company for News Limited
- 1981: News International was formed to manage News Corp's British properties
- 1985: News Corporation officially expanded beyond print media and acquired the 20th Century-Fox film studio
- 1986: Metromedia stations were used to launch the Fox Broadcasting Network
- 1990: Fox Entertainment Group was established to manage News Corp's filmed entertainment properties
- Mid 1990s: Fox Sports and Fox News were launched, with both becoming leaders in cable news and sports programming
- 2004: News Corp relocated from its long time Adelaide headquarters to New York City at 1211 Avenue of Americas
- 2007: Dow Jones & Company was acquired, giving News Corp financial news outlets like the The Wall Street Journal
- 2013: Following controversies involving the News of the World in 2011, investors pushed for changes, leading to the second News Corp and 21st Century Fox
- 2019: The Walt Disney Company acquired majority of 21st Century Fox, while the remaining news, sports, and broadcast units became Fox Corporation
- 2023: Attempts to remerge News Corp and Fox were explored but later withdrawn

News Corp was established in 1980 by Rupert Murdoch as a holding company for News Limited. News Limited was founded in 1923 in Adelaide by James Edward Davidson, funded by the Collins House mining empire for the purpose of publishing anti-union propaganda; subsequently the controlling interest was bought by the Herald & Weekly Times. In 1949, Keith Murdoch took control of Adelaide's afternoon tabloid The News. When he died in 1952, his son Rupert inherited a controlling interest in The News. News Limited operates today as News Corporation's Australian brand and includes ownership of The Australian, operating out of Surry Hills, in Sydney.

=== Expansion into the United States ===
News Ltd. made its first acquisition in the United States in 1973, when it purchased the San Antonio Express and News (the two papers merged in 1984). Soon afterwards it founded the National Star, a supermarket tabloid, and in 1976 it purchased the New York Post from Dorothy Schiff for $31 million.

In 1984, News Corp acquired the Chicago Sun-Times from Field Enterprises (later sold in 1986 to the American Publishing Company subsidiary of Canada-based Hollinger) for $90 million and Travel Weekly and other trade magazines from Ziff Davis. In March 1985, News Corp bought a 50% stake in TCF Holdings, the holding company of the movie studio 20th Century Fox from Marc Rich for $162 million, and later acquired the remaining stake from Marvin Davis in September for $325 million.

Two months after the acquisition of the 50% stake in TCF Holdings, on May 6, 1985, News Corp announced it was buying the Metromedia television stations and its syndication arm Metromedia Producers Corporation from John Kluge for $3.5 billion, setting the stage for the launch of a fourth U.S. commercial broadcasting television network. On September 4, 1985, Murdoch became a naturalized citizen to satisfy the legal requirement that only United States citizens could own American television stations. In 1986, the Metromedia deal was completed, and the Fox Broadcasting Company, simply known as Fox, launched on October 9, with Joan Rivers' The Late Show as its late-night program, it would later air prime-time programming starting in April 1987.

=== Expansion and consolidation ===
In 1986 and 1987, News Corp (through subsidiary News International) moved to adjust the production process of its British newspapers, over which the printing unions had long dominated. A number of senior Australian media moguls were brought into Murdoch's powerhouse, including John Dux, who was managing director of the South China Morning Post. This led to a confrontation with the printing unions National Graphical Association and Society of Graphical and Allied Trades. The move of News International's London operation to Wapping in the East End resulted in nightly battles outside the new plant. Delivery vans and depots were frequently and violently attacked. Ultimately the unions capitulated.

In 1987, News Corp acquired the book publisher Harper and Row for $300 million, and later acquired the British book publisher William Collins, Sons in 1989 for $721 million, who later merged with Harper to form HarperCollins that same year.

In 1988, News Corp acquired the Philadelphia-based Triangle Publications, publisher of the magazines TV Guide, Seventeen, and the Daily Racing Form for $3 billion. To raise money, the trade publications were sold to Reed International.

By 1992, News Corp had incurred large debts, which forced it to sell many of the American magazine interests it had acquired in the mid-1980s to K-III Communications (now Rent Group), as well spinning off long-held Australian magazines interests as Pacific Magazines. Much of this debt came from its stake in the Sky Television satellite network in the UK, which incurred massive losses in its early years of operation, which (like many of its business interests) was heavily subsidised with profits from its other holdings until it was able to force rival satellite operator BSB to accept a merger on its terms in 1990. (The merged company, BSkyB, has dominated the British pay-TV market since.)

In 1993, News Corp acquired a 63.6% stake of the Hong Kong-based STAR TV satellite network from Pearson for over $500 million, followed by the purchase of the remaining 36.4% in July 1995. Murdoch declared that:

(Telecommunications) have proved an unambiguous threat to totalitarian regimes everywhere ... satellite broadcasting makes it possible for information-hungry residents of many closed societies to bypass state-controlled television channels.

In 1995, the Fox network became the object of scrutiny from the Federal Communications Commission (FCC) when it was alleged that its Australian base made Murdoch's ownership of Fox illegal. The FCC, however, ruled in Murdoch's favor, stating that his ownership of Fox was in the public's best interests. It was also noted that the stations themselves were owned by a separate company whose chief shareholder was a U.S. citizen, Murdoch, although nearly all of the stations' equity was controlled by News Corp. In the same year, News Corporation announced a deal with MCI Communications to develop a major news website as well as funding a conservative news magazine, The Weekly Standard. In the same year, News Corp launched the Foxtel pay television network in Australia in a partnership with Telstra and Publishing & Broadcasting Limited.

On July 17, 1996, News Corporation announced that it would acquire television production and broadcasting company New World Communications (who acquired a 20% stake in 1994 for $200 million), for $2.48 billion in stock and was completed on January 22, 1997.

On October 7, 1996, the Fox Entertainment Group launched the Fox News Channel, a 24-hour cable news network to compete against Time Warner's rival channel CNN.

In 1999, News Corporation significantly expanded its music holdings in Australia by acquiring the controlling share in a leading Australian-based label, Michael Gudinski's Mushroom Records, merging it with already held Festival Records to create Festival Mushroom Records (FMR). Both Festival and FMR were managed by Rupert Murdoch's son James Murdoch for several years.

Also mid 1999, The Economist reported that News Corp paid comparatively lower taxes, and Newscorp Investments specifically had made £11.4 billion ($20.1 billion) in profits over the previous 11 years but had not paid net corporation tax. It also reported that after an examination of the available accounts, Newscorp could normally have been expected to pay corporate tax of approximately $350 million. The article explained that in practice, the corporation's complex structure, international scope, and use of offshore tax havens allowed News Corporation to pay minimal taxes.

=== Further development ===
In late 2003, News Corp acquired from General Motors a controlling stake of 34% in Hughes Electronics, for US$6 billion. The company, which was the operator of DirecTV, the largest American satellite television system, was turned into a subsidiary renamed as the DirecTV Group. In the following year, News Corp has announced a merge on its own satellite television platforms DirecTV and Sky across Latin America in a deal to eliminate competition, resulting in DirecTV Latin America. DirecTV was sold to Liberty Media in 2008 in exchange for its stake in News Corporation.

In January 2005, shortly after reincorporation in the United States, News Corporation announced that it was buying out Fox Entertainment Group. The manoeuvre delisted Fox from the New York Stock Exchange; Fox had traded on the NYSE under the ticker FOX.

In 2004, Murdoch set aside $2 billion and handpicked a team of young executives to look at possible ways to use the Web as a distribution platform. That team was composed of four rising stars: Ross Levinsohn, Adam Bain, Travis Katz, and Michael Kirby. The four became the backbone of what would become News Corp's digital division, Fox Interactive Media.

Shortly after, in July 2005, News Corporation purchased the social networking website Myspace for $580 million. News Corporation had beat out Viacom by offering a higher price for the website, and the purchase was seen as a good investment at the time. Of the $580 million purchase price, approximately $327 million has been attributed to the value of Myspace according to the financial adviser fairness opinion. Within a year, Myspace had tripled in value from its purchase price.

In February 2007, Murdoch announced at the McGraw-Hill Media Summit that the Fox Entertainment Group would launch a new business news channel later in the year, which would compete directly against rival network CNBC. Murdoch explained that the channel would be more "business-friendly" than CNBC, because he felt that they "leap on every scandal, or what they think is a scandal." In July 2007, News Corp. reached a deal to acquire Dow Jones & Company, owners of The Wall Street Journal, for $5 billion. Despite CNBC already having a contract with Dow Jones to provide content and services to the network, the Fox Entertainment Group officially launched the Fox Business Network on October 15, 2007. Alexis Glick, the network's original morning show host and vice president of business news, indicated that its lawyers had reviewed the details of Dow Jones' contract with CNBC, but noted that it would still "actively use" other Dow Jones properties.

On December 16, 2008, News Corporation announced that it would transfer its US shares from the NYSE to the NASDAQ which was made effective two weeks later. In September 2009, News Corp established NewsCore, a global wire service set up to provide news stories to all of News Corp's journalistic outlets.

In April 2010, News Corporation sold Bulgarian broadcaster bTV, which it launched on 1 June 2000, as part of a deal to Central European Media Enterprises (CME) for $400 million in addition to another $13 million for working capital adjustment. The deal included cable channels bTV Comedy and Btv Cinema and News Corporation's 74% stake in Radio Company CJ which included five radio stations.

In September 2010, due to the Fijian government's requirement that the country's media outlet must be 90% owned by Fiji Nationals, News Corporation sold 90% of their stake in their Fijian newspapers (Fiji Times, Nai Lalakai, and Shanti Dut) to Motibhai Group of Companies.

In November 2010, News Corp purchased education technology and student progress tracking company Wireless Generation for $360 million. The company was the NY City Education Department's partner for its School of One pilot program (now Teach to One).

In late February 2011, News Corp officially put the now-struggling Myspace up for sale, which was estimated to be worth $50–200 million. Losses from the last quarter of 2010 were $156 million, over double of the previous year, which dragged down the otherwise strong results of parent News Corp. Its struggles were attributed to the growth of the competing social network Facebook. The deadline for bids, May 31, 2011, passed without any above the reserve price of $100 million being submitted. The rapid deterioration in Myspace's business during the most recent quarter had deterred many potent suitors. Later in June, Specific Media and pop singer Justin Timberlake bought the site for $35 million, which CNN reported noted was "far less than the $580 million News Corp. paid for Myspace in 2005." Murdoch went on to call the Myspace purchase a "huge mistake".

On July 13, 2011, Rupert Murdoch announced that the company would withdraw its takeover bid for BSkyB due to concerns relating to the News of the World scandal. News Corporation already owned, and continues to own, 39.1% of BSkyB.

On June 6, 2012, News Corporation announced that it would buy out ESPN Inc.'s stake in ESPN Star Sports to gain full control over the Asia-Pacific sports network. On November 20, 2012, News Corporation announced that it would acquire a 49% stake in the regional sports network YES Network, owned by the Major League Baseball team New York Yankees. In January 2013, News Corp. attained 54.5% majority control of Sky Deutschland.

On August 21, 2012, News Corporation's 20th Century Fox signed a five-year worldwide distribution deal with DreamWorks Animation, which would distribute its films through 20th Century Fox that began with The Croods in 2013, and has lasted until Captain Underpants: The First Epic Movie in 2017, following Comcast and NBCUniversal's purchase of the animated studio in 2016.

On February 4, 2013, News Corporation announced the sale of IGN and its related properties to the publishing company Ziff Davis. News Corp. had planned to spin off IGN as an independent company, but failed to do so.

=== Scandals ===
In July 2011, News Corp closed down the News of the World newspaper in the United Kingdom due to allegations of phone hackings. The allegations include trying to access former Prime Minister Gordon Brown's voice mail, and obtain information from his bank accounts, family's medical records, and private legal files. Allegations of hacking have also been brought up in relation to former Prime Minister Tony Blair, and the Royal Family. Other allegations put out by The Guardian newspaper include the exploitation, with intent to gain access to or use private information, of a list of 4,332 names or partial names, 2,987 mobile phone numbers, 30 audio tapes of varying length and 91 PIN codes, of a kind required to access the voicemail of the minority of targets who change the factory settings on their mobile phones. The names are said to include those of British victims of September 11, 2001 terror attacks, family members of victims of the "7/7" bombings on London's transit system, family members of British troops killed overseas, Milly Dowler, a 13-year-old missing British schoolgirl who was later found dead in 2002, actor Hugh Grant and a lawyer representing the family of Princess Diana's lover at the inquest into her death. On July 13, 2011, News Corp withdrew its bid to purchase the final 61% stake in BSkyB after pressure from both the Labour and Conservative Parties in Parliament.

Allegations about the violation of ethical standards by the News Corporation subsidiary News of the World have been speculatively applied to News Corporation holdings in the United States. Senator John Rockefeller (D-WV) stated on July 12, 2011, that there should be a government investigation into News Corporation "to ensure that Americans have not had their privacy violated." His statement was echoed on Wednesday by Sen. Robert Menendez (D-NJ), who specifically requested an investigation into 9/11 victims, as well as Sen. Frank Lautenberg (D-NJ) who encouraged an investigation by the Securities and Exchange Commission. On July 13, 2011, Representative Peter King (R-NY) wrote a letter to the FBI requesting an investigation into News Corporation's ethical practices, and on July 14, the FBI opened a probe into the hacking of 9/11 victims. Les Hinton, chief executive of the media group's Dow Jones, resigned on July 15, saying, "I have seen hundreds of news reports of both actual and alleged misconduct during the time I was executive chairman of News International and responsible for the company. The pain caused to innocent people is unimaginable. That I was ignorant of what apparently happened is irrelevant and in the circumstances I feel it is proper for me to resign from News Corp, and apologize to those hurt by the actions of the News of the World."

In 2012, following a BBC Panorama report, allegations were made that News Corp subsidiary NDS Group had used hackers to undermine pay TV rivals around the world. Some of the victims of the alleged hacking, such as Austar, were later taken over by News Corp and others such as Ondigital later went bust. NDS had originally been set up to provide security to News Corp's pay TV interests but emails obtained by Fairfax Media revealed they had also pursued a wider agenda by distributing the keys to rival set-top box operators and seeking to obtain phone records of suspected rivals. The emails were from the hard drive of NDS European chief Ray Adams. In 2012, it was also revealed that Australian Federal police were working with UK police to investigate hacking by News Corp.

=== Restructuring and sale of 21st Century Fox to Disney ===
21st Century Fox's logo, used from its founding in 2013 until The Walt Disney Company bought most of its assets in 2019

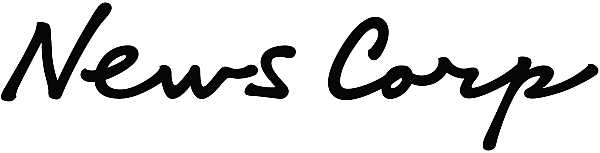
The second News Corporation's logo. It is stylized as News Corp.

Fox Corporation's logo, which is used by Fox but it is colored black instead of blue

On June 28, 2012, Rupert Murdoch announced that, after concerns from shareholders in response to the recent scandals and to "unlock even greater long-term shareholder value", News Corporation's assets would be restructured into two publicly traded companies, one oriented towards media, and the other towards publishing. News Corp's publishing operations were spun out into a new News Corporation with Robert James Thomson, editor of The Wall Street Journal, as CEO. The original News Corporation, which retained most of its media properties (such as the Fox Entertainment Group and 20th Century Fox) and Murdoch as CEO, was renamed 21st Century Fox. Murdoch remained chairman of both companies.

Shareholders approved the split on June 11, 2013. On June 19, 2013, preliminary trading for the new News Corporation on the Australian Securities Exchange commenced in preparation for the formal split that was finalized on June 28, 2013. Shareholders received one share of new News Corp for every four shares they owned of the old News Corp. The two new companies began trading on the Nasdaq on July 1, 2013. In early 2014, 21st Century Fox entered talks regarding a possible merger with Time Warner, but abandoned these efforts on August 5, 2014. In 2015, 21st Century Fox and National Geographic Society formed a joint venture group to control National Geographic's media properties, with 21CF retaining a 73% stake in the company's media assets In 2017, after months of speculation, Disney announced its intent to acquire 21st Century Fox. Comcast and Disney engaged in a bidding war to acquire the media conglomerate, but 21CF ultimately agreed to Disney's US$71.3 billion offer. With the acquisition set to complete by March 20, 2019, 21st Century Fox and Comcast engaged in a bidding war over Sky. While Comcast was unsuccessful in outbidding Disney to acquire 21CF, it acquired Sky in 2018, with 21CF having sold its stake of Sky to Comcast.

On March 19, 2019, the broadcasting, sports, and news assets of 21CF were spun off to Fox Corporation, a separate company, on March 19, 2019, to avoid anti-trust issues for Disney. 21CF's remaining media assets was acquired by Disney on March 20, 2019, and assets with the "Fox" branding were renamed to avoid confusion with Fox Corporation. With Disney having acquired 21st Century Fox, News Corporation's direct successor ceased existence as an entity, and much of its former assets are now controlled by Disney, News Corp, and Fox Corp. Attempts for a re-merger between News Corp and Fox Corp were explored in 2022. Had it been successful, News Corp and Fox would have been under the same corporate umbrella for the first time since 2013, but efforts were quickly abandoned in 2023.

== Corporate affairs ==
=== Shareholders ===
- In August 2005, the Murdoch family owned only about 29% of the company of which as of June 2013 had been diluted to around 17%. However, nearly all of these shares were voting shares which currently stand at 39% of the total voting shares, and Rupert Murdoch retained effective control of the company. Nonetheless, John Malone of Liberty Media had built up a large stake, with about half of the shares being voting shares. Therefore, in November 2006, News Corporation announced its intention to transfer its 38.5% interest in DirecTV Group to John Malone's Liberty Media; in return it bought back Liberty's 16.3% stake in News Corp., giving Murdoch tighter control of the latter firm. Murdoch sold 17.5 million class A shares in December 2007.
- Another major stakeholder has been Al-Waleed bin Talal, of the Saudi Royal Family. In 1997, Time reported that Al-Waleed owned about five percent of News Corporation. In 2010, Alwaleed's stake in News Corp. was about 7 percent, amounting to $3 billion. In 2013, News Corp. had a $175 million (19 percent) investment in Al-Waleed's Rotana Group, the Arab world's largest entertainment company. Al-Waleed sold all his shares in November 2017

=== Annual conference ===
News Corporation organized an annual management conference, discussing media issues related to geopolitics. Attendees included News Corporation executives, senior journalists, politicians and celebrities. Previous events were in Cancún, Mexico, and the Hayman Island off the coast of Australia. The events were private and secretive, there are no records available for the agenda or talks given at the conferences, and no uninvited journalists are permitted access.

The 2006 event in Pebble Beach, California was led by Rupert Murdoch. According to a copy of the agenda leaked to the Los Angeles Times and other media accounts, issues discussed related from Europe to broadcasting and new media, terrorism to the national policy. The event included speeches from Murdoch, Actor and former governor of California Arnold Schwarzenegger, former British Prime Minister Tony Blair, Bono, Al Gore, Senator John McCain and Bill Clinton while Israel's President, Shimon Peres, appeared on a panel named "Islam and the West". Other notable attendees included Newt Gingrich and Nicole Kidman.

=== Corporate governance ===
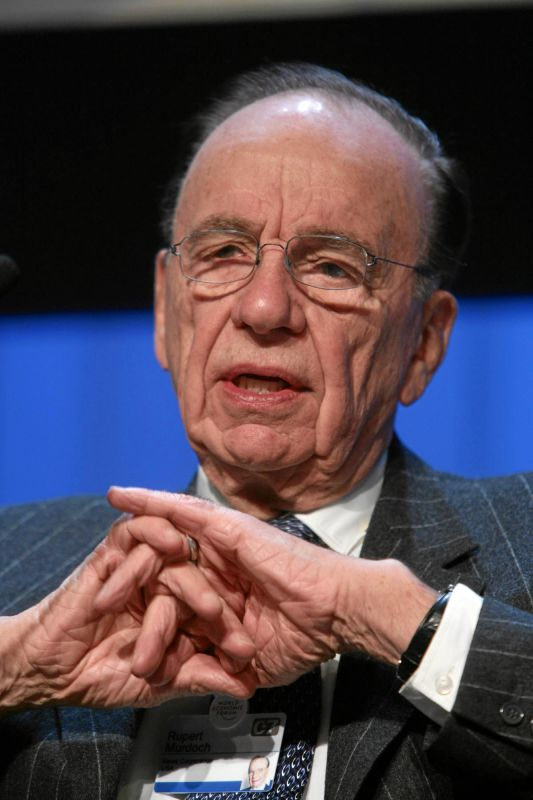
Rupert Murdoch at the World Economic Forum, 2007

The company's Board of Directors consisted of 17 individuals at the time of its break up:

- Rupert Murdoch (Chairman of the Board and Chief Executive Officer)
- José María Aznar (Former Prime Minister of Spain)
- Natalie Bancroft (Director)
- Peter Barnes
- James W. Breyer
- Chase Carey (President and Chief Operating Officer)
- Elaine Chao
- David F. DeVoe (Chief Financial Officer)
- Viet Dinh
- Sir Roderick Ian Eddington
- Joel I. Klein (Executive Vice President)
- James Murdoch (Chairman & Chief Executive Officer, Europe & Asia)
- Lachlan Murdoch
- Álvaro Uribe (Former President of Colombia)
- Stanley S. Shuman (Director Emeritus)
- Arthur M. Siskind (Director Emeritus, Senior Advisor to the Chairman)
- Daniel Suárez García (Chairman and CEO, Latin America)Political donations

In anticipation of US midterm elections, News Corporation donated $1 million to the Republican Governors Association in June 2010. The move was criticized by Democrats, who said this was evidence of News Corporation's news outlets conservative leanings (see Fox News Channel controversies). The Democratic Governors Association also criticized the donation and demanded more transparency in the reporting by News Corporation companies. DGA head Nathan Daschle wrote to the chairman of News Corporation company Fox News, Roger Ailes: "In the interest of some fairness and balance, I request that you add a formal disclaimer to your coverage any time any of your programs covers governors or gubernatorial races between now and election day."

Around the same time, News Corporation also donated $1 million to the United States Chamber of Commerce. The Chamber aggressively supported the Republican effort to retake Congress in 2010. This donation and an earlier $1 million contribution that News Corporation made to the Republican Governor's Association led media critics to question whether the company had crossed an ethical line for a media company.

== Final holdings ==
News Corporation split up to 21st Century Fox and the current incarnation of News Corporation on June 28, 2013. All media and broadcasting assets, except media assets owned by News Limited, now belong to Fox Corporation, the legal successor to News Corporation (and 21st Century Fox). Meanwhile, newspapers and other publishing assets, including media assets under News Limited, were spun off and belong to News Corp.

=== Music and radio ===
- Fox Film Music Group
- Fox News Radio

=== Sport ===
- Majority ownership of the Brisbane Broncos (68.9%) and full ownership of the Melbourne Storm rugby league team.
- Colorado Rockies (15%)

=== Studios ===
- Fox Entertainment Group: 20th Century Fox's parent company
  - 20th Century Fox: a film production/distribution company
    - 20th Century Fox Animation
      - Blue Sky Studios – production of CGI films e.g. Ice Age.
  - Fox Searchlight Pictures – specialized films.
  - Fox 2000 Pictures – general audience feature films.
  - Fox Music
  - 20th Century Fox International
  - 20th Century Fox Español
  - 20th Century Fox Home Entertainment
- 20th Century Fox Television – primetime television programming.
  - 20th Television – television distribution (syndication).
  - 20th Century Fox Television Distribution – television distribution.
  - Fox 21 – low scripted/budgeted television production company.
  - Fox Television Animation – animation production company.
  - Fox Television Studios (productions)- market specific programming e.g. COPS and network television company.
    - Fox Television Studios International
    - Fox World Productions
- Fox Faith – Promotion and distribution of Christian and related "family friendly" movies on DVD and some theatrical release.
- Fox Studios Australia, Sydney, New South Wales
- Fox Filmed Entertainment
- New Regency Productions (20%) – general audience feature films.
- Regency Enterprises (20%) – parent company of New Regency Productions (50%).
- Fox Star Studios fully owned -the Studio for Indian Movie's Production and Distribution.

=== TV ===
News Corp agreed to sell eight of its television stations to Oak Hill Capital Partners for approximately $1.1 billion as of December 22, 2007. The stations are US Fox affiliates. These stations, along with those already acquired by Oak Hill that were formerly owned by The New York Times Company, formed the nucleus of Oak Hill's Local TV LLC division.

==== Broadcast ====
- Fox Broadcasting Company (Fox), a US broadcast television network
- MyNetworkTV, a US broadcast television network
- Fox Television Stations, a group of owned and operated Fox television stations

==== Satellite television ====
- Sky UK, United Kingdom & Ireland (39.1% holding). In practice, a controlling interest; the company is now owned by Comcast.
- Sky Network Television, New Zealand (44%)
- Sky Italia (100%), Italy's largest pay TV service (previously owning part of Stream TV)
- Sky Deutschland (54.5%), Germany's largest pay TV provider
- Tata Sky (30%), an Indian DirectToHome TeleVision Service Provider. (in partnership with Tata Group, who owns a 70% stake)
- Foxtel (25%), Australia, a joint venture with Telstra (50%) and Consolidated Media Holdings (25%)
- FOX Italy, Italian Broadcast and Production Company (with 2 HDTV)
- Star TV Channels (Satellite TeleVision Asian Region), an Asian satellite TV service having 300 million viewers in 53 countries, mainly in India, China & other Asian countries
- Phoenix Television (17.6%), satellite TV network with landing rights in Hong Kong, and select provinces on Mainland China.

==== Cable ====
Cable TV channels owned (in whole or part) and operated by News Corporation include:

- Fox Business Network, a business news channel.
- Fox Classics, a channel airing classic TV shows and movies
- Fox Classics (Japan)
- Fox Sports & Entertainment/Fox BS238
- Fox Movie Channel, an all-movie channel that airs commercial-free movies from 20th Century Fox's film library
- Fox News Channel, a 24-hour news and opinion channel
- Fox Sports Networks, a chain of US regional cable news television networks broadcasting local sporting events linked together by national sports news programming. Local channels include "Fox Sports Southwest", "Fox Sports Detroit", etc. (some affiliates are owned by Cablevision.)
  - SportSouth, a regional sports network in the United States, with its headquarters in Atlanta, and affiliate of Fox Sports Net.
  - Sun Sports a regional sports network in the United States, with its headquarters in Miami, Florida, and affiliate of Fox Sports Net.
- Fox College Sports, a college sports network consisting of three regionally aligned channels, mostly with archived Fox Sports Net programmes but also some live and original content.
- Fox Sports International
  - Fox Soccer Channel, a United States digital cable and satellite network specialising mainly in soccer.
  - Fox Soccer Plus, a sister network to FSC, but including coverage of other sports, most notably rugby. Launched in 2010 after News Corporation picked up many of the broadcast rights abandoned by Setanta Sports when it stopped broadcasting in the U.S.
  - Fox Pan American Sports (37.9%) – joint venture with Hicks, Muse, and Tate & Furst.
    - Fox Sports en Español (50%), a Spanish-language North American cable sports network; its sports line-up is tailored to appeal to a Latin American audience.
    - Fox Sports en Latinoamérica, a Latin American satellite and cable sports network.
- FX Networks, a cable network broadcasting reruns of programming previously shown on other channels, but recently creating its own programming, including the Emmy Award-winning programmes The Shield and Damages.
- SPEED
- FUEL TV
- Big Ten Network, cable and satellite channel dedicated to The Big Ten Conference, launched August 2007 (49%)
- National Geographic Channel (joint venture with National Geographic Society) 67%
- National Geographic Channel International 75%
- Nat Geo Mundo (joint venture with National Geographic Society)
- Nat Geo Wild (joint venture with National Geographic Society)
- YES Network (49%), regional cable sports network; broadcasts New York Yankees and Brooklyn Nets games, among other teams.
- Fox International Channels, domestic cable channels offering different formats of Fox programming in over thirty countries worldwide.
  - Fox
  - Fox Life
  - Fox Life HD
  - Fox Filipino
  - Fox Crime
  - FX
  - Fox Horror
  - Fox Movies
  - Fox Sports
  - Speed Channel
  - National Geographic Channel
  - National Geographic Channel HD
  - National Geographic Wild
  - National Geographic Adventure
  - National Geographic Music
  - National Geographic Junior
  - Cult
  - Next:HD
  - Voyage
  - Real Estate TV
  - BabyTV
  - Fox Toma 1 – Spanish-language television production.
  - Fox Telecolombia – Spanish-language television production. (51%)
  - Utarget.Fox – European and Latin American online ad company, plus now handles TV ad sales.
- Central & South America
  - Fox Latin American Channels – channels available in over 17 countries in Latin America
    - National Geographic Channel
    - National Geographic Channel HD
    - National Geographic Wild
    - Nat Geo Music
    - Universal Channel
    - Universal HD
    - Fox Channel
    - Fox HD
    - FX
    - Fox Life
    - Fox Sports
    - Speed Channel
    - Baby TV
    - Utilisima
    - Fox One-Stop Media – advertising sales for company owned and third party channels in Latin America
  - LAPTV (60%) (Latin American Pay Television) operates 8 cable movie channels throughout South America excluding Brazil.
  - Telecine (12.5%) operates 5 cable movie channels in Brazil.
- Australia
  - Premier Media Group (50%)
    - Fox Sports 1
    - Fox Sports 2
    - Fox Sports 3
    - SPEED
    - FoxSportsNews
    - Fuel TV Australia
  - Premium Movie Partnership (20%) – movie channels, a joint venture between 20th Century Fox, Sony, NBCUniversal, Viacom and Liberty Media

PLATFORMS

- India
  - Hathway Cable & Datacom (22.2%), India's 2nd largest cable network through 7 cities including Bangalore, Chennai, Delhi, Mumbai & Pune
- Taiwan
  - Total TV (20%), a pay TV platform with JV partner KOO's Group majority owner (80%). News Corp also has a 20% interest in the KOO's Group directly.

=== Internet ===
- News Corp. Digital Media
  - Foxsports.com – website with sports news, scores, statistics, video and fantasy sports
  - Hulu (27%) – online video streaming site in partnership with NBCUniversal.
  - Flektor – provides Web-based tools for photo and video editing and mashups.
  - Slingshot Labs – web development incubator (Includes the sites DailyFill).
  - Strategic Data Corp – interactive advertising company which develops technology to deliver targeted internet advertising.
  - Scout.com
  - WhatIfSports.com – sports simulation and prediction website. Also provides fantasy-style sports games to play.
- Indya.com – 'India's no. 1 Entertainment Portal'
- ROO Group Inc (5% increasing to 10% with performance targets)
- News Digital Media
  - News.com.au – Australia's most popular news website in 2013 and as of April 2014
  - CarsGuide
  - in2mobi.com.au
  - TrueLocal.com.au
  - Moshtix.com.au – a ticket retailer
  - Learning Seat
  - Wego News owns minority stake in Wego.com
  - Weair News owns minority stake in weair.com
  - Netus (75%) – investment co. in online properties.
- Move (80%)
  - realtor.com – United States online real estate portal
  - move.com
  - listhub.com
  - Doorsteps
  - Tigerlead
  - Moving.com
  - Top Producer
  - Reesio
  - Relocation.com
  - SeniorHousingNet.com
- REA Group (60.7%)
  - Realestate.com.au
  - Business Services s.r.l. Access our internationalization service opens to endless proposals and possibilities of rooting in markets around the world.
  - Casa.it (69.4%), Sky Italia also holds a 30.6% share
  - atHome group, operator of leading realestate websites in Luxembourg, France, Belgium and Germany.
    - Altowin (51%), provider of office management tools for realestate agents in Belgium.
  - Propertyfinders.com (50%), News International holds the remaining 50%
    - Sherlock Publications, owner of hotproperty.co.uk portal and magazine titles 'Hot Property', 'Renting' and 'Overseas'
    - ukpropertyshop.co.uk, most comprehensive UK estate agent directory.
  - PropertyLook, property websites in Australia and New Zealand.
  - HomeSite.com.au home renovation and improvement website.
  - Square Foot Limited, Hong Kong's largest English Language property magazine and website
    - Primedia – Holding co. of Inside DB, a Hong Kong lifestyle magazine.
- TadpoleNet Media (10%) Hosts of ArmySailor.com
- New Zealand
  - Fatso – leading online DVD subscription service (ownership through stake in Sky Network Television).
  - Fox Networks – one of the largest international ad networks.
  - Expedient InfoMedia blog network.
- Storyful
- Unruly
- The News Broadcasting Corporation
  - TNBCLive.com - United States's popular news website in 2017 and as of April 2022

=== Other assets ===
- Fox Sports Grill (50%) – Upscale sports bar and restaurant with 7 locations: Scottsdale, Arizona; Irvine, California; Seattle; Plano, Texas; Houston; San Diego; and Atlanta.
- Fox Sports Skybox (70%) – Sports fans' Bar & Grill at Staples Center and six airport restaurants.
- News America Marketing (US) – (100%) – nation's leading marketing services company, products include a portfolio of in-store, home-delivered and online media under the SmartSource brand.
- Rotana (19%) – Largest Arab entertainment company owned by Saudi Prince Al-Waleed bin Talal
- The Daily – iPad only newspaper delivered daily.
- Making Fun – social game developer for making games for social networking sites, smartphones, tablets and other devices.
- Stockpoint
- Lane Bryant

=== Books ===
- HarperCollins book publishing company
  - HarperCollins India
- Zondervan Christian book publisher
  - Inspirio – religious gift production.

=== Newspapers ===
- Australia published by News Limited.
  - The Australian (Nationwide)
  - Community Media Group (16 QLD & NSW suburban/regional titles)
  - Cumberland-Courier Newspapers (23 suburban/commuter titles)
  - The Courier-Mail (Queensland)
  - The Sunday Mail (Queensland)
  - The Cairns Post (Cairns, Queensland)
  - The Gold Coast Bulletin (Gold Coast, Queensland)
  - The Townsville Bulletin (Townsville, Queensland)
  - The Daily Telegraph (New South Wales)
  - The Sunday Telegraph (New South Wales)
  - Herald Sun (Victoria)
  - Sunday Herald Sun (Victoria)
  - The Weekly Times (Victoria)
  - Leader Newspapers (33 suburban Melbourne titles)
  - MX (Sydney, Melbourne and Brisbane CBD)
  - The Geelong Advertiser (Geelong, Victoria)
  - The Advertiser (South Australia)
  - The Sunday Mail (South Australia)
  - Messenger Newspapers (11 suburban Adelaide, SA titles)
  - The Sunday Times (Western Australia)
  - The Mercury (Tasmania)
  - Quest Newspapers (19 suburban Brisbane, QLD titles)
  - The Sunday Tasmanian (Tasmania)
  - Northern Territory News (Northern Territory)
  - The Sunday Territorian (Northern Territory)
  - The Tablelands Advertiser (Atherton Tablelands and the Far North, Queensland)
- Fiji
  - Fiji Times (National) (10%)
  - Nai Lalakai (10%)
  - Shanti Dut (10%)
- Papua New Guinea
  - Papua New Guinea Post-Courier (National) (62.5%)
- UK and Ireland newspapers, published by subsidiaries of News International Ltd.
  - News Group Newspapers Ltd.
    - The Sun (published in Scotland as The Scottish Sun and in Ireland as The Irish Sun)
      - The Sun on Sunday
  - Times Newspapers Ltd.
    - The Sunday Times
    - The Times
    - The Times Literary Supplement
- US newspapers and magazines
  - The New York Post
    - Community Newspaper Group
      - The Brooklyn Paper
      - Bronx Times-Reporter
      - Brooklyn Courier-Life
      - TimesLedger Newspapers
  - Dow Jones & Company
    - Consumer Media Group
      - The Wall Street Journal
      - Wall Street Journal Europe
      - Wall Street Journal Asia
      - Barron's – weekly financial markets magazine.
      - Marketwatch – Financial news and information website.
      - Far Eastern Economic Review
    - Enterprise Media Group
      - Dow Jones Newswires – global, real-time news and information provider.
      - Factiva – provides business news and information together with content delivery tools and services.
      - Dow Jones Indexes – stock market indexes and indicators, including the Dow Jones Industrial Average.
      - Dow Jones Financial Information Services – produces databases, electronic media, newsletters, conferences, directories, and other information services on specialised markets and industry sectors.
      - Betten Financial News – leading Dutch language financial and economic news service.
    - Local Media Group
      - Ottaway Community Newspapers – 8 daily and 15 weekly regional newspapers.
    - STOXX (33%)- joint venture with Deutsche Boerse and SWG Group for the development and distribution of Dow Jones STOXX indices.
    - Vedomosti (33%) – Russia's leading financial newspaper (joint venture with Financial Times and Independent Media).
    - SmartMoney
  - The Timesledger Newspapers of Queens, New York:
    - Bayside Times, Whitestone Times, Flushing Times, Little Neck Ledger, Jamaica Times, Astoria Times, Forest Hills Ledger
  - The Courier-Life Newspapers in Brooklyn
  - The Brooklyn Paper
  - Caribbean Life
  - Flatbush Jewish Journal

=== Magazines ===
- U.S.
  - SmartSource Magazine (weekly Sunday newspaper coupon insert)
  - The Weekly Standard
- Australia
  - Alpha Magazine
  - Australian Country Style
  - Australian Golf Digest
  - Australian Good Taste
  - Big League
  - BCME
  - Delicious
  - Donna Hay
  - Fast Fours
  - GQ (Australia)
  - Gardening Australia
  - InsideOut (Aust)
  - Lifestyle Pools
  - Live to Ride
  - Notebook
  - Overlander 4WD
  - Modern Boating
  - Modern Fishing
  - Parents
  - Pure Health
  - Super Food Ideas
  - Truck Australia
  - Truckin' Life
  - twowheels
  - twowheels scooter
  - Vogue (Australia)
  - Vogue Entertaining & Travel
  - Vogue Living
- UK
  - Inside Out magazine

== Former holdings ==
=== Sold ===
- Fox Family Worldwide – sold to The Walt Disney Company in July 2001 before being reunited 18 years later in 2019.
  - BVS Entertainment library
  - Fox Kids/Fox Children's Productions/Fox Family library
    - Marvel Films Animation/New World Animation library
      - DePatie–Freleng Enterprises/Marvel Productions library
        - Dr. Seuss animated TV specials (rights currently owned by Warner Bros. Discovery under the Dr. Seuss Foundation)
    - Power Rangers (rights currently owned by HASBRO)
    - Digimon (rights currently owned by Toei Animation)
    - Dragon Ball Z (general English dubbing and broadcasting rights currently owned by Sony Pictures under Crunchyroll, LLC excluding The Tree of Might, Battle of Gods, Resurrection 'F' and Broly are currently owned by Disney Studios via Buena Vista International and 20th Century Studios)
  - SIP Animation
- FitTV - sold to Discovery Communications (now Warner Bros. Discovery) on September 1, 2001
- Home entertainment rights to Casper the Friendly Ghost library (rights currently owned by NBC Universal under DreamWorks Classics)
- Home entertainment rights to Garfield animation library (rights currently owned by Paramount Skydance under Paws, Inc.)

=== Defunct ===
- Fox Reality Channel (2005–2010)
- Fox Sports Houston (2009–2012)
- News of the World

== See also ==
- Succession of Rupert Murdoch, a 2024 court case
- List of conglomerates
