= Devoe =

Devoe or DeVoe may refer to:

- Devoe (name)
- Bell Biv DeVoe, American music group
  - Ronnie DeVoe, group member of the American music trio Bell Biv DeVoe
- Mount DeVoe, mountain in Canada
- Emma Smith DeVoe, American suffragette and political activist
- Clifford DeVoe, the name of a DC Comics villain who takes the title "The Thinker", an archnemesis of the Flash
