= Fox (Norwegian TV channel) =

- Country: Norway
- Broadcast area: Norway
- Headquarters: Oslo, Norway

Programming
- Languages: Norwegian; English (with Norwegian subtitles)
- Picture format: 16:9 SDTV and HDTV

Ownership
- Owner: Fox Networks Group (Disney Media and Entertainment Distribution)
- Sister channels: FOX HD

History
- Launched: 21 March 2011 (as Fox Crime); 2 July 2013 (as Fox)
- Replaced: TV8
- Closed: 31 March 2021
- Former names: Fox Crime (2011-2013)

Links
- Website: www.foxtv.no

Availability

Terrestrial
- RiksTV: Channel 20

Fox was a Norwegian entertainment television channel owned and produced by Fox Networks Group. It was launched on 21 March 2011 as Fox Crime, and changed to current name on 1 July 2013. The channel ceased broadcasts on 31 March 2021, with most of its content shifting to Disney+.

== Programming ==
=== Final series ===
- American Dad!
- Bless the Harts
- Family Guy
- Futurama
- The Jurisdiction
- New Girl
- MacGyver
- Modern Family
- The Resident
- War of the Worlds

=== Former series ===
==== As Fox ====
- Alaska Wing Men
- The Bridge
- Cops
- Crossing Jordan
- Da Vinci's Demons
- Death in Paradise
- Detektiv Frost
- The Glades
- Law & Order
- Mad Dogs
- Magnum, P.I.
- Medium
- NCIS
- Numb3rs
- The Pretender
- Psych
- Scam City
- Snapped
- The Sopranos
- Taboo

=== Former films ===
==== As Fox ====
- Madagascar 3
