= Stockpoint =

Online financial information provider

- Founded: 1995
- Defunct: 2004
- Fate: Acquired by Dow Jones & Company
- Successor: Dow Jones Client Solutions
- Headquarters: San Francisco, California, United States
- Products: Financial information, market data, investment website

Stockpoint was a provider of online financial information (quotes, charts, portfolio tracking, etc.) through its websites InvestorsEdge.com and Stockpoint.com. The company also supplied SaaS (software as a service) capabilities which powered market data features for over 200 other websites such as Barclays Global Investors and Piper Jaffray, the San Francisco Chronicle and Wired News.

Stockpoint was subsequently acquired by Dow Jones & Company and formed part of Dow Jones Client Solutions, a division of News Corporation, and Interactive Data Corporation.

== History ==
=== Early history ===
The company’s lineage can be traced to Ethos Corporation, a California company that was commonly known as InvestorsEdge, and Neural Applications Corporation, a Delaware corporation based in Coralville, Iowa. Ethos was founded in 1994 by Patrick Connolly, Sean John Connolly, Chris Dominguez, and Michael Bloom. Neural was formed in 1993 by Harry O. Hefter, Robert Staib, and William Staib to coincide with an investment from Equity Dynamics, a private equity firm. Early employees that formed Stockpoint and its product offering included Matthew Barry, Laura Watts, Justin Grant, Susan Hense, Rob Lamb, Jeff Broderick, Luan Cox, Joe Altmaier, Naftaly Stramer, Josh Hatwich, Paul Juffer, Santosh Ananthraman, and Bob Squires.

After a short stay in Mill Valley, CA (home of Ethos’ founders) Ethos relocated to the Financial District, San Francisco, California in an office directly above a popular bar, the Royal Exchange. The company hosted a raucous annual party at its San Francisco offices in honor of Saint Patrick's Day.

Ethos in its first years fit the image of a stereotypical startup. The sole conference room doubled as an engineer's office, and business meetings were often interrupted by a frantic developer running in to fix an urgent bug. Early employees had to build their own offices and bring in their own desks and chairs. Rock music and beer were common in the office, suits and ties were not.

Like many small startups, Ethos benefitted from partnerships with larger companies, such as Hewlett Packard. and Microsoft, looking to gain credibility via association with popular websites. Partners in turn provided publicity and discounts which helped Ethos to survive on a small budget in its earliest days.

For its part, Neural also had an entrepreneurial culture, but given its heritage in providing industrial data-mining solutions, substantial venture funding from the Midwest, and its primary location in Iowa, the company had a more formal office environment. In 1995, Neural began building a Java-based financial services application that was launched in April 1996 as NetProphet.

The Neural and Ethos teams became acquainted in late 1996 and reached a common vision for combining Ethos’ marketing strengths, presence in the Bay Area, and InvestorsEdge.com website with Neural’s engineering expertise, data-mining capabilities, and more established corporate infrastructure. Neural purchased Ethos as a pooling of interests transaction on May 5, 1997.

=== Creation of Stockpoint name and growth of the SaaS business ===
“StockPoint” was first announced on October 1, 1997 as a product that combined Ethos’ InvestorsEdge website with Neural’s NetProphet Java-based charting and trading software. On October 20, 1997, Neural announced that its entire financial services business unit had been renamed to “Stockpoint”.

Starting in 1998, Stockpoint realized significant growth. Under Luan Cox's sales leadership, revenues grew from $462,000 per quarter in mid 1998 to $6.8 million per quarter ($27 million annualized) by the end of 2001. In September, 1999, Neural changed its name to Stockpoint to reflect its focus on its financial services offerings.

During the 1998 to 2001 “hypergrowth” phase, Stockpoint quickly expanded its staffing while it worked to establish mature business processes. Stockpoint filed on March 31, 2000 for its initial public offering. At that time, Stockpoint had 134 employees based in Coralville, Iowa, San Francisco, New York, and London.

During this growth period, there was substantial personnel change and some founders of both Ethos and Neural left for other opportunities or for personal reasons. In its final Form S-1 SEC filing in September 2000, Stockpoint listed its directors and executive officers as:

- William Staib, CEO, Director; Scott Porter, CFO; Luan A. Cox, EVP, Sales; Chris Dominguez, EVP; Carolyn Mattimore, VP, Marketing; Santosh Ananthraman, VP, Research; Naftaly Stramer, VP, Development; Harry Hefter, Chairman; Outside Directors: David Sengpiel, Terry E. Branstad, George G. Daly, B. Thomas Henry

Despite Stockpoint having a customer base of predominantly stable enterprise customers with multiyear contracts, Stockpoint was unable to complete its public offering due to the poor stock market conditions that coincided with the burst of the dot-com bubble. Stockpoint withdrew its registration statement for a public offering in April 2001.

=== Acquisitions and later history ===
Stockpoint was acquired by content aggregator ScreamingMedia in August 2001 for $21M. Top executives of Stockpoint stayed on to manage the combined company’s technology, sales, and content teams.

ScreamingMedia, which changed its name to Pinnacor in 2002, was acquired by MarketWatch in 2003 for $103M. Over time, stockpoint.com website traffic was merged into marketwatch.com, while Stockpoint's SaaS offerings continued.

MarketWatch was acquired by Dow Jones in 2004 for $519M. Stockpoint's SaaS services continued as part of Dow Jones Client Solutions.

Dow Jones was acquired by News Corp in 2007, and some of the ex-Stockpoint pieces of Dow Jones Client Solutions were sold to Interactive Data Corporation in 2009.

== Products ==
Stockpoint had two core parts of its business:

- a B2C (business-to-consumer) website. The company's website was first launched as InvestorsEdge.com in 1995, and changed its name to Stockpoint.com in 1997. The site offered free lookup of stock quotes, charts of historical performance, mutual fund comparisons, financial news, and more. Competitors in Stockpoint's early years included Quote.com and MSN Investor (now MSN MoneyCentral).
- a SaaS (software as a service) offering for companies wanting to integrate financial information and data into their own websites. For example, the San Francisco Chronicle and Wired News websites both used Stockpoint's solutions to provide financial data features on their sites. In addition, some companies used Stockpoint solutions to add financial features to corporate Intranets, for example tracking the performance of mutual funds in a company's 401(k) plan. As online trading accelerated in the mid to late 1990s, Stockpoint became a leading SaaS supplier of market data tools to banks and brokerage firms, primarily oriented toward their retail investor websites.

In 1997, Stockpoint developed technology which dramatically lowered the cost and complexity of customizing a SaaS solution for individual corporate clients. This led to increasing growth and profitability for the SaaS part of the business. Meanwhile, increased competition put pressure on margins of the B2C website. Eventually, custom SaaS solutions became the focus of the company, with the B2C website serving as a proving ground for new SaaS features.

After the company was acquired by competitor MarketWatch in 2003, the stockpoint.com website was retired, and the SaaS solutions continued.
