= Kevin Eschenfelder =

American sportscaster

- Presenting career
- Show: Houston Rockets broadcasts (Pregame and Postgame Host)
- Network: Space City Home Network
- Time slot: Varies by schedule
- Show: Houston Cougars football (play-by-play announcer)
- Station: Sportstalk 790 AM
- Time slot: Varies by schedule
- Country: United States

Kevin Eschenfelder is an American sportscaster who currently serves as the primary host of Houston Astros and Houston Rockets pregame and postgame on Space City Home Network. Eschenfelder also works in radio as the play-by-play announcer for Houston Cougars football games since their start in the American Athletic Conference and current in-studio host and fill-in television play-by-play announcer for the Houston Astros.

== Early career ==
When Eschenfelder was in elementary school, his father worked as a statistician and spotter for the Houston Oilers, giving him access to the radio press box at the Astrodome. At the age of 15, he began helping his dad keep statistics for the Houston Astros and Houston Oilers.

Eschenfelder graduated from Dulles High School in Sugar Land, Texas. During his senior year at Dulles, he began working as a statistician for the Home Sports Entertainment (HSE) network and interned at Newsradio 740 KTRH.

Eschenfelder attended Alvin Community College, where he served as the voice announcer for Alvin High School sporting events on KACC (the on-campus radio station for ACC). Just before he graduated from Alvin Community College, Eschenfelder got hired as a play-by-play announcer for Houston Baptist University (an NCAA Division I team at the time) at HSE. Eschenfelder's first event for Home Sports Entertainment was a Houston Baptist University basketball game with Greg Lucas in 1987.

In 1990, Eschenfelder graduated with a bachelor's degree from the University of Houston–Clear Lake.

== Fox Sports Net ==
Eschenfelder joined Home Sports Entertainment (later known as Fox Sports Net) full-time in June 1991 and worked pre- and postgame shows for 17 seasons, with stints in Dallas–Fort Worth and Houston. His pre- and postgame commitments included coverage of the Dallas Mavericks, Houston Rockets and San Antonio Spurs NBA teams as well as the Dallas Stars NHL team.

During baseball season, he anchored shows for the Houston Astros and Texas Rangers and has said his favorite memory with HSE/Prime Sports/FSN was Game 6 of the 2005 National League Championship Series when the Astros clinched their first pennant.

Eschenfelder became known to Houston viewers during Rockets and Astros games as the in-studio host for "Club House," a pre-game show that later evolved "Southwest Sports Tonight." Southwest Sports Tonight was a half-hour program on FSN Southwest and its Houston-area feed, FSN Houston, but also complemented its regional news program, the "Southwest Sports Report" on non-event nights.

Eschenfelder's additional contributions includes calling college football and basketball play-by-play for the Southland Conference, Southwest Conference, Big 12 Conference, and WAC. Eschenfelder has also served as a fill-in analyst during Astros telecasts and fill-in play-by-play voice for Dallas Mavericks games with Fox Sports Southwest.

Eschenfelder bid farewell to viewers over an Astros telecast on September 20, 2012. His final day with the station was September 21, 2012.

== Space City Home Network ==
Eschenfelder joined CSN Houston when it began broadcasting in October 2012, continuing as the face that fans of the Rockets and Astros have seen before and after games. He was the host of "SportsTalk Live," the network's one-hour live show each weekday.

Once a month, SportsTalk Live aired a special Friday edition called "SportsTalk Live Friday Tailgate Edition," which was taped in front of a live audience outside CSN Houston's downtown studio next to the House of Blues. The October 2013 edition featured Eschefelder interviewing Rockets players James Harden, Chandler Parsons, Patrick Beverley, Isaiah Canaan, and Rockets great Calvin Murphy.

Besides his role on STL, Eschenfelder participated on other specialty programing on CSN Houston. As part of the "A Conversation With..." series, Eschenfelder had an exclusive interview with longtime Astros broadcaster and Ford Frick Award recipient, Milo Hamilton. The interview aired throughout September 2013.
