= Space City Home Network =

Regional sports network in Houston

- Space City Home Network logo (2023-now)
- Country: United States
- Broadcast area: Texas; Louisiana; Arkansas; Oklahoma eastern New Mexico; Worldwide (via satellite)
- Headquarters: Houston, Texas

Programming
- Language: English
- Picture format: 1080i (HDTV); 480i (SDTV)

Ownership
- Owner: Houston Astros (50%); Houston Rockets (50%)

History
- Launched: October 1, 2012; 14 years ago
- Replaced: Fox Sports Houston (January 12, 2009 - October 5, 2012); Comcast Sports Southwest (September 1, 2009 - October 1, 2012)
- Former names: Comcast SportsNet Houston (October 1, 2012 - November 17, 2014); Root Sports Southwest (November 17, 2014 - July 14, 2017); AT&T SportsNet Southwest (July 14, 2017 - October 2, 2023)

Links
- Website: spacecityhn.com

Availability

Streaming media
- DirecTV Stream: Internet Protocol television
- FuboTV: Internet Protocol television

The Space City Home Network is an American regional sports network owned jointly by the Houston Rockets and Houston Astros. Headquartered in Houston, Texas, the network broadcasts regional coverage of sports events throughout Southeast Texas, mainly focusing on professional sports teams based in Greater Houston, namely the Astros and Rockets, as well as local college teams.

The channel went on the air in 2012 as Comcast SportsNet Houston under the ownership of Houston Regional Sports Network L.P., a joint venture with Comcast, along with the Astros and Rockets, after the closure of Fox Sports Houston. Following the bankruptcy of Comcast SportsNet Houston in 2013, DirecTV and AT&T acquired the network in 2014 and relaunched under the Root Sports brand as Root Sports Southwest; but after DirecTV was acquired by AT&T, the channel is rebranded yet again to AT&T SportsNet Southwest in 2017. In 2023, when Warner Bros. Discovery, the former WarnerMedia that AT&T acquired and divested, announced it would exit the regional sports network business, by selling or closing its AT&T SportsNet networks, the Astros and Rockets announced it would reacquire the channel which was rebranded to the Space City Home Network in October 2023.

As of 2024, the Space City Home Network is available on cable providers throughout Texas, Louisiana, Arkansas, parts of Oklahoma and eastern New Mexico, and nationwide on satellite via DirecTV. The feed for Astros games is also carried on the MLB.TV streaming service.

== History ==
=== Launch of Comcast SportsNet Houston ===
The idea for a team-owned regional sports network in Houston was proposed in 1999, when George Postolos, then the president of the Houston Rockets, floated the idea to Fox, which passed on the offer. Four years later, in 2003, the Rockets decided to partner with the Houston Astros to launch an RSN. The first order of business was to sever ties with Fox Sports Southwest, which carried games from both teams at the time (first through the main network, and then through a subfeed called Fox Sports Houston for the Houston market launched in April 2005). This led to a protracted court battle between Fox and the two teams that was settled after 20 months, leading to a new broadcast deal with the network valued at $600 million over 10 to 15 years. However, this contract contained a clause allowing the teams to terminate the contract and negotiate with other networks starting in late 2009. Fox Sports then moved the Astros and Rockets telecasts to Fox Sports Houston, which was separated from Fox Sports Southwest into its own network on January 12, 2009.

The Astros/Rockets group held discussions with Comcast, DirecTV and AT&T about partnering to form a new network, all of which failed to garner a deal. The continuation of the Astros and Rockets broadcasts on Fox Sports Houston was on the table as the network offered $1.2 billion over 10 years. However, it was ownership in a regional sports network that the two teams wanted. This led to the teams agreeing to a $1 billion contract with Comcast, which included a 77.307% ownership interest in the network (with Comcast holding the remaining 22.693% interest), through a joint subsidiary, Houston Regional Sports Network L.P. The new network, Comcast SportsNet Houston (which operated as part of the Comcast SportsNet RSN group), launched on October 1, 2012. On October 4, three days after Comcast SportsNet Houston launched, Fox Sports Houston was shut down and its former programming moved back to parent network Fox Sports Southwest.

==== Carriage controversies ====
CSN Houston was available only on Comcast systems in Houston, along with several smaller providers. In total, as CSN Houston, it reached only around 40% of all television households in the Houston market. Upon its launch, ratings for CSN Houston's sports telecasts were competitive based on the total number of households that received the network, but suffered due to its lack of availability within the Houston market. The first 15 games of the Houston Rockets' 2012–13 season had an average audience share of 0.95 (totalling 21,050 households). In comparison, the first 15 games of the Rockets' 2011–12 season when broadcast on Fox Sports Houston had an average audience share of 1.45. Network president Matt Hutchings later explained that "Everybody wants the channel. We want them to have it. We just have to find that right deal."

The lack of availability of Comcast SportsNet Houston on other major television providers serving Greater Houston, such as DirecTV, Dish Network, Suddenlink and U-verse, was controversial. NBCUniversal had demanded subscriber rates as high as $3.40 per month from providers in order to carry the network. In particular, DirecTV CEO Michael White criticized CSN Houston, along with other recently established regional sports networks, for having increasingly high carriage fees that must be passed on to consumers. On April 5, 2013, Houston Mayor Annise Parker invited officials from AT&T, Comcast, DirecTV and Suddenlink to a summit on expanding carriage of the network. In a bid to improve its carriage, CSN Houston offered a 37-day free preview of the network through May 2013 to providers in the network's regional territory, which also included Time Warner Cable and Suddenlink Communications, along with a number of smaller providers. However, only three smaller cable operators opted to carry the network's free preview, and Suddenlink got into further conflicts over the terms regarding the free preview, as the provider refused to offer it carriage outside of Houston proper. In the midst of its eventual bankruptcy, En-Touch, a small provider serving suburbs and outlying cities in the area (such as Cypress, Katy, Missouri City, and Sugar Land), threatened to drop CSN Houston due to its high carriage rates not being justified for the amount of programming being offered, and its overall ratings among the provider's customers.

=== Bankruptcy filing and new ownership ===
On September 27, 2013, NBCUniversal announced that affiliates of it and parent company Comcast had filed an involuntary Chapter 11 bankruptcy petition for the network to "resolve structural issues affecting CSN Houston's partnership." The move did not sit well with the Astros, which stated that the filing was made "improperly" to prevent the team from ending its agreement with the network. The Astros also revealed that it did not receive its rights fees from the network's parent company for the final three months of the 2013 season. On February 4, 2014, Judge Marvin Isgur placed Comcast SportsNet Houston under Chapter 11 bankruptcy protection.

On August 6, 2014, DirecTV and AT&T proposed a reorganization plan, in which it would acquire CSN Houston in a 60/40 joint venture. At the time, AT&T was in the process of acquiring DirecTV, pending regulatory approval. The reorganization offer was approved by the court on October 30, 2014, although Comcast appealed the decision in order to address a $100 million loan that had been given to the network. Attorneys from the companies involved reached an agreement to allow the deal to continue through Comcast's appeals process. The Rockets' general counsel Rafael Stone stated that the approval gave a "clear path" for the network to return to full-time service in November, and transition to DirecTV's Root Sports brand, and the network subsequently cancelled all of its existing studio shows on October 22, 2014.

=== Relaunch as Root Sports Southwest, then AT&T SportsNet Southwest ===
DirecTV and AT&T's joint acquisition of the network was closed on November 17, 2014. The network officially rebranded as Root Sports Southwest at 6:00 a.m. that day, and began to be carried on AT&T U-verse and DirecTV, as promised in the final reorganization plan. The new brand, which matches that of Fox Sports Southwest, signifies that the network would serve the entirety of its broadcast region rather than solely Houston – a distinction which had brought difficulties in negotiating carriage deals outside of the Houston area. Some of CSN Houston's employees, primarily on-air talent and staff responsible for the network's Rockets and Astros telecasts, were retained, however it laid off 96 other employees. At its relaunch, Root Sports Southwest did not air as many locally produced studio programs as it did under Comcast ownership.

The $48.5 billion acquisition of DirecTV by AT&T was approved by the FCC and closed on July 24, 2015, which effectively places Root Sports Southwest under full AT&T ownership by virtue of its ownership of DirecTV. On April 8, 2016, DirecTV Sports Networks rebranded under the AT&T name as AT&T Sports Networks.

On June 12, 2017, AT&T Sports Networks announced that the network, along with Root Sports Rocky Mountain, Root Sports Utah, and Root Sports Pittsburgh, will rebrand under the name AT&T SportsNet, with all network programming and on-air talent remaining intact. The name change took effect on July 14, 2017. Like all other AT&T SportsNet channels, after AT&T acquired Time Warner in 2018, AT&T SportsNet was moved into the WarnerMedia News & Sports division in March 2019, alongside Time Warner's existing national sports unit Turner Sports. Later, in May 2021, it was announced that AT&T would instead divest the entirety of WarnerMedia, and contribute it into a joint venture with Discovery Inc., forming a new company later announced as Warner Bros. Discovery.

=== Relaunch as Space City Home Network ===
On February 24, 2023, Warner Bros. Discovery announced that it would leave the RSN business. Originally scheduled for a winddown by March 31, WBD and Major League Baseball would later agree to sustain RSN operations through the end of the MLB season. In August, John Ourand of the Sports Business Journal reported that the Astros and Rockets were close to a deal to take over AT&T SportsNet Southwest, with a deal expected to be finalized before the 2023–24 NBA season. The next month, Jason Bristol of Houston CBS affiliate KHOU reported that a trademark had been filed by Houston Sports Network, LLC, headquartered at the Toyota Center, for the name Space City Home Network. The Astros and Rockets confirmed the acquisition of AT&T SportsNet Southwest on September 29, effective the following day, with the rebranding to take place on October 3. The graphics remain unchanged aside from the AT&T logo being replaced by the SCHN logo.

== Programming ==
=== Houston Astros ===
The Space City Home Network serves as the regional television broadcaster of Major League Baseball games involving the Houston Astros, airing all games not nationally televised. All telecasts are preceded by a pre-game show and followed by an hour-long post-game show. On the days of home games, these shows are usually broadcast live from Daikin Park, whereas on the days of away games they are broadcast from the Space City Home Network studio. The network also airs a half-hour magazine show entitled Astros Bases Loaded, which includes both regular weekly editions during the regular season and several special editions aired sporadically during the off-season. Other Astros programming includes game replays, Spring Training games, Astros Playback (re-airs of significant Astros games from the previous season during the off-season), and coverage of special events, including Hall of Fame induction ceremonies and press conferences.

=== Houston Rockets ===
The Space City Home Network also serves as the home of National Basketball Association games involving the Houston Rockets. As with the network's Astros coverage, all games that are not being featured on a national network are televised and include pre-game and post-game shows. Rockets coverage also includes the team magazine show Rockets All Access, which includes both weekly regular season editions and less frequent special and "best of" editions, most of which air during the off-season, as well as Rockets Playback (similar to Astros Playback), game replays, and coverage of team press conferences and other special events.

=== Houston Comets ===
On October 22, 2026, It was announced that the Houston Comets games will simulcast games on the network and begin airing locally on KHOU and KTBU beginning with the 2027 season.

=== Houston SaberCats ===
The network serves as the regional home of the Houston SaberCats of Major League Rugby, airing all games not televised by a national network.

=== Houston Dash ===
The Space City Home Network also serves as the home of the Houston Dash.

=== Collegiate & High School Programming ===
The Space City Home Network airs college football from the Texas Southern Tigers, Western Athletic Conference men’s and women’s basketball, and two annual baseball tournaments — the Shriners College Classic and the Cactus Jack HBCU Classic. In addition, the channel features Houston area UIL high school football in the fall and a year-round high school sports magazine program. Collegiate magazine and coaches shows airing on the network feature the athletic programs of several Division 1 universities throughout the Southwest, including The Pulse: Texas A&M, a weekly program covering Texas A&M Aggies Football.

=== Houston Sports Awards ===
The network is the home of the annual Houston Sports Awards show.

=== Former Programming ===
- Southland, Conference USA, Mountain West, Lone Star, SEC, WCC, CAA, and Big Sky Conference football and basketball
- Nightly sports talk and highlights shows outside of Rockets and Astros pre/post-game coverage.
- Houston Dynamo soccer matches, pre- and postgame coverage (now on Apple TV+)

== Availability ==
Space City Home Network is available on most pay television providers serving the Greater Houston area, including AT&T U-verse and national satellite provider DirecTV, along with smaller providers such as Phonoscope Communications, Coastal Link, En-Touch and Consolidated Communications. Dish Network, Charter Communications, and Suddenlink Communications are the only remaining major providers in the area that do not carry the network at present. Per their new ownership of the network, AT&T and DirecTV added the network upon its re-launch under the Root Sports brand. It was announced on February 5, 2019, that AT&T SportsNet Southwest will be added to FuboTV starting February 11, 2019, becoming the first over-the-top streaming service to provide any AT&T SportsNet channel.

== Related services ==
=== Space City Home Network Alternate ===
Space City Home Network Alternate is an alternate feed of Space City Home Network that broadcasts 24 hours a day. Although it usually simulcasts programming from the main Space City Home Network, it is also used to broadcast select events from teams to which Space City Home Network holds the broadcast rights within the designated market if two or more games scheduled to be broadcast on the channel are held simultaneously, requiring the overflow feed to carry games that cannot air on the main feed.

== On-air staff ==
=== Notable current on-air staff ===
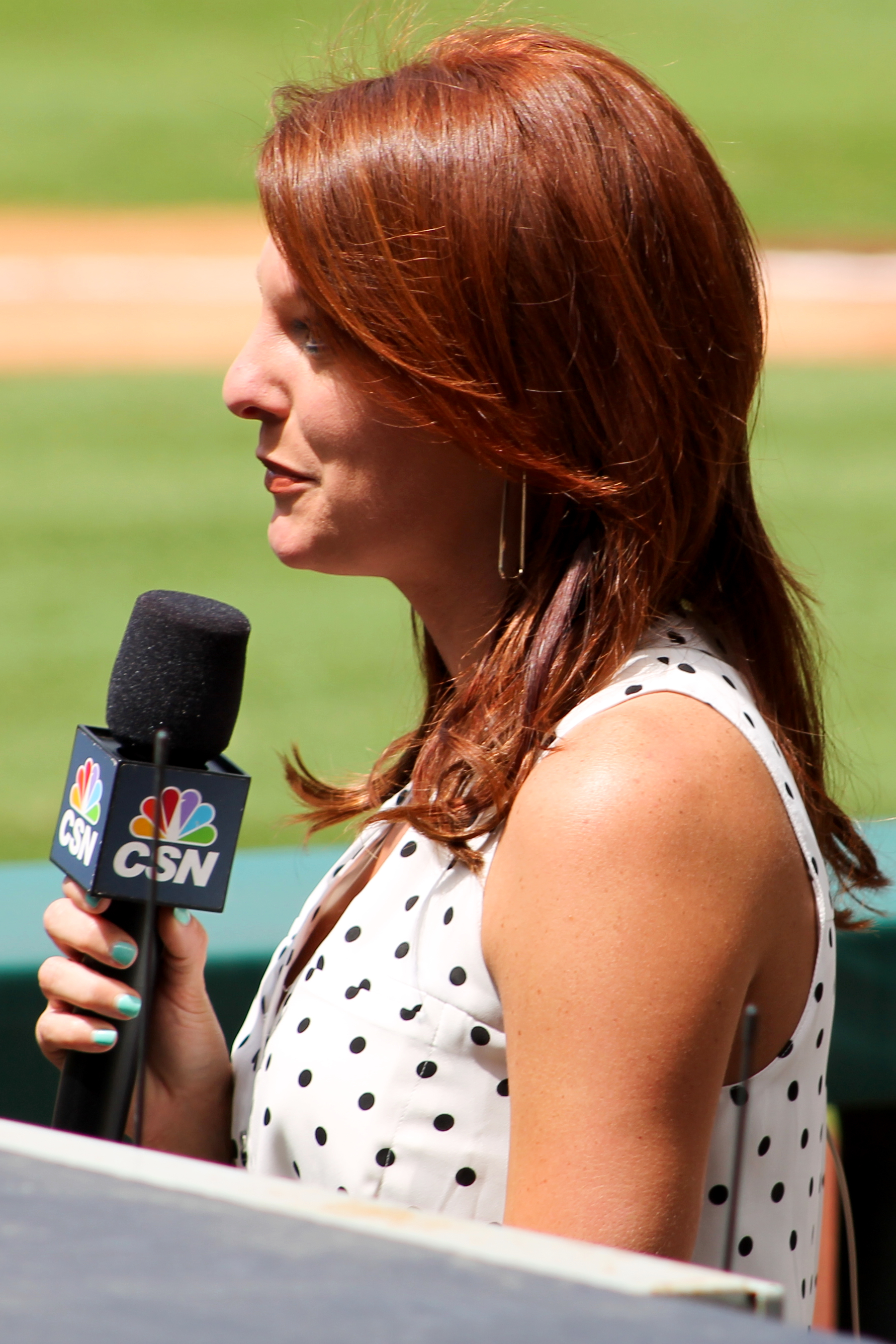
Julia Morales reporting at an Astros game when Space City Home Network was known as CSN Houston (2014)

==== Hosts ====
- Kevin Eschenfelder
- Adam Wexler

==== Houston Rockets ====
- Craig Ackerman – play-by-play announcer
- Ryan Hollins – home and road analyst
- Ashley Stroehlein - sideline reporter
- Calvin Murphy – studio analyst
- Gerald Green – studio analyst

==== Houston Astros ====
- Todd Kalas – play-by-play announcer
- Geoff Blum – analyst/fill-in play-by-play announcer
- Julia Morales – field reporter
- Kevin Eschenfelder – fill-in play-by-play announcer
- Brian Bogusevic – studio analyst
- Ryan Pressly — studio analyst
- Josh Reddick – fill-in studio analyst

=== Former on-air staff ===
- Butch Alsandor – occasional studio analyst
- Alan Ashby - Houston Astros color commentator/fill-in play-by-play announcer
- Michael Bourn – Houston Astros contributor
- Bill Brown – Houston Astros play-by-play announcer
- Matt Bullard - Houston Rockets home and road analyst
- Bill Doleman – occasional studio analyst
- Clyde Drexler – Houston Rockets home analyst
- Mario Elie - fill-in studio analyst
- Bart Enis – sideline reporter
- Cayleigh Griffin - Houston Rockets sideline reporter (2019-2022)
- Clay Hensley – Houston Astros contributor
- Art Howe – studio analyst
- Michelle Margaux - Houston Rockets sideline reporter (2018-2019)
- Leila Rahimi - anchor of SportsNet Central and field reporter
- Vanessa Richardson - Houston Rockets sideline reporter (2022-2026)
- Mike Stanton – Houston Astros studio analyst
- Preston Wilson — occasional studio analyst
- Bill Worrell – Houston Rockets play-by-play announcer

== See also ==
- Comcast Sports Southwest – a defunct Houston-based channel dedicated to local college and high school sports in the Southwestern United States
- Comcast/Charter Sports Southeast – a defunct channel that featured college and high school sports in the Southern United States
- Houston Astros Radio Network – the current radio network of the Houston Astros
- Sports in Texas
