= Charles Devoe =

American model

- Born: Charles Devoe; February 5, 1982; Colorado, United States
- Died: December 17, 2010 (aged 28); Rockaway, Queens, United States

Charles Devoe (February 5, 1982 – December 17, 2010) was an American male model. He was known for appearing in ad campaigns for numerous brands such as Dolce & Gabbana, Abercrombie & Fitch and Anne Klein.

== Biography ==
Devoe was born on February 5, 1982. In 2004, he graduated from the University of Colorado Boulder with a degree in business, whereupon he moved to New York City to pursue modeling.

He was quickly signed by IMG Models and enjoyed immediate success, working campaigns for smaller fashion and hair styling brands. Major photographers such as Bruce Weber, Mario Testino, and Steven Klein would eventually request Charles to do campaigns for major brands such as Dolce & Gabbana, Abercrombie & Fitch, and Anne Klein. He was represented by major modeling agencies in Milan, Paris, Barcelona, Los Angeles, Chicago, and New York City.

He was an avid athlete, and enjoyed a wide range of extreme sports, from freestyle BMX to snowboarding.

=== Death ===
Charles died on December 17, 2010, after a month-long coma resulting from a surfing accident at Rockaway Beach.
