= David DeVoe =

American businessman

Dave DeVoe
- Born: David F. DeVoe; 1947 (age 77–78); United States
- Occupation(s): CFO of News Corporation, businessperson, executive

David "Dave" F. DeVoe (born 1947) has been a Director and Chief Financial Officer of News Corporation since 1990.

DeVoe has also been Senior Executive Vice President of News Corp. since 1996. Among those two, he was formerly a director of Gemstar-TV Guide International and DirecTV; he is no longer a director as of 2008.
