= Ellen DeVoe =

Ellen DeVoe is a professor in the Clinical Practice Department at the Boston University School of Social Work and founding director of the Trauma Certificate Program. From 2013 to 2019, DeVoe was the director of the Interdisciplinary PhD Program in Sociology & Social Work, PhD Program in Social Work.

== Education ==
- BA (social history and women's studies), Princeton University, 1986
- MSW (clinical social work and mental health), University of Denver, 1990
- PhD (social work and psychology), University of Michigan, 1996
- NIMH postdoctoral fellowship (family violence research training), University of New Hampshire

== Career ==
DeVoe has taught at the Columbia University School of Social Work, University of New Hampshire's College of Lifelong Learning in Portsmouth, New Hampshire, Eastern Michigan University, and the University of Michigan School of Social Work.

DeVoe was the principal investigator for Strong Families Strong Forces (SFSF), a four year program for which BUSSW received a "grant from the U.S. Department of Defense to fund a program that would help support the healthy reintegration of soldiers from Operation Enduring Freedom/Operation Iraqi Freedom into their families."
