= Fox Sports Houston =

- Final Fox Sports Houston logo, used from September 1 to October 5, 2012.
- Country: United States
- Broadcast area: Texas, Louisiana, Oklahoma, Eastern New Mexico, and Arkansas
- Network: Fox Sports Networks
- Headquarters: The Woodlands, Texas

Programming
- Language(s): English
- Picture format: 720p (HDTV); 480i (SDTV)

Ownership
- Owner: Fox Entertainment Group (News Corporation)
- Sister channels: Broadcast: KRIV/Houston; KTXH/Houston

History
- Launched: April 2005; 20 years ago (as a sub-feed of FSN Southwest); January 12, 2009; 16 years ago (as a standalone feed)
- Closed: October 5, 2012; 12 years ago
- Replaced by: Comcast SportsNet Houston

Fox Sports Houston was an American regional sports network that was owned by Fox Cable Networks, a unit of the Fox Entertainment Group subsidiary of News Corporation, and operated as an affiliate of Fox Sports Networks. The channel, which operated out of facilities based in downtown Houston, Texas, originally began in April 2005 as a sub-feed of sister network Fox Sports Southwest and became a separate 24-hour channel on January 12, 2009.

Fox Sports Houston held the broadcast rights to most of the professional sports franchises based in Houston, carrying games from the Houston Astros (Major League Baseball), Houston Rockets (NBA) and the Houston Dynamo (Major League Soccer); it also carried coverage of collegiate events involving Conference USA members, the Houston Cougars and Rice Owls as well as high school sports events throughout the Houston area. After losing the broadcast rights to the Astros and Rockets to Comcast SportsNet Houston, now known as the Space City Home Network, the network was re-absorbed into Fox Sports Southwest on October 5, 2012.

== History ==
A separate FSN feed for Houston and the surrounding area launched in April 2005, just as the Astros and Rockets were working together to establish their own local sports network with the city's then-dominant cable television provider, Time Warner Cable. For the better part of two seasons (from 2003 to 2005), all Houston Rockets games that were not televised nationally on ABC or ESPN were only available on broadcast television, splitting games between independent station KNWS-TV (channel 51, now Azteca affiliate KYAZ) and WB affiliate KHWB (channel 39, now CW affiliate KIAH). Working out with the new deal with the Astros and Rockets, Fox Sports Networks decided to establish a completely separate feed for Houston and its surrounding outer television markets, however just operating evenings and on weekends, while Fox Sports Southwest continued to transmit in the region in other dayparts.

Fox Sports Houston logo, used from 2009 to 2012.

In addition to Astros and Rockets telecasts, FSN Houston also broadcast games featuring the University of Houston and Rice University football and basketball teams, and local high school sports events. The channel also aired a Houston-branded edition of the Southwest Sports Report, the network's nightly sports news and highlights program. Fox Sports Houston produced Rockets and Astros games for co-owned MyNetworkTV owned-and-operated station KTXH (channel 20).

On January 12, 2009, Fox Sports Houston split from Fox Sports Southwest and relaunched as a 24-hour standalone channel. The new feed allowed the channel to provide more local content and maintain its own identity, as well as air replays of Houston Rockets and Astros games, which it had not been able to do before, according to Ramon Alvarez, spokesman for Fox Sports Houston. It also allowed for more extensive coverage of the city's NFL franchise, the Houston Texans. Fox Sports Southwest's primary Dallas-based feed was previously carried in the Houston market for most non-event programming. The channel was carried only for live game broadcasts on DirecTV and Dish Network, whose viewers continued to receive Fox Sports Southwest as their full-time RSN.

=== Loss of broadcast rights and re-absorption into Fox Sports Southwest ===
Fox Sports Houston's partnership with the Rockets ended after the 2011–12 NBA season, and their partnership with the Astros ended after the 2012 Major League Baseball season. The two teams subsequently struck broadcast deals with Comcast (which acquired the cable television franchise rights to the Houston market in a trade with Time Warner Cable in exchange for the latter's Dallas-Fort Worth system in 2007), forming the nucleus of the new regional sports network Comcast SportsNet Houston, which became the home to both teams when it launched on October 1, 2012.

On October 2, 2012, Fox Sports Networks announced that it would shut down Fox Sports Houston three days later on October 5, re-absorbing it into Fox Sports Southwest; the move resulted in the layoffs of some of the network's staff. Longtime network personality Patti Smith remains with Fox Sports as a host for team programming pertaining to the Houston Texans, while Kevin Eschenfelder left the network in late September to join Comcast SportsNet Houston as a reporter. Reporter Greg Lucas also did not continue with Fox Sports; while it was initially unclear if he would join Comcast SportsNet Houston, he ultimately did not move to that network.
