= Fox Crime =

- Country: United States

Programming
- Picture format: 1080i HDTV (downscaled to 16:9 576i for the SDTV feed)

Ownership
- Sister channels: 24Kitchen, Fox Life, Fox Comedy, Fox, FX, BabyTV, National Geographic, Nat Geo Wild, Nat Geo People

History
- Launched: 17 January 2005 (Russia); 31 October 2005 (Italy); 13 October 2006 (Bulgaria, ex-Yugoslavia); 28 September 2007 (Portugal); 15 February 2010 (Spain); 30 June 2010 (India); 9 July 2013 (Africa)
- Closed: 30 September 2012 (Russia); 30 June 2013 (Norway); 30 September 2014 (Spain); 17 April 2015 (India); 31 July 2015 (Japan); 1 October 2016 (Africa); 30 June 2021 (Italy); 31 August 2021 (Now TV feed, Hong Kong); 30 September 2021 (Southeast Asia and Hong Kong); 30 September 2022 (Turkey); 30 November 2022 (Middle East and North Africa); 30 September 2023 (Albania, Bulgaria and Balkans); February 6, 2024 (Portugal)
- Replaced by: Star Crime (Bulgaria, Balkans and Portugal); Fox Life (Africa & Spain); Fox (Russia, Baltics & Norway); Star Movies Select HD (India); Fox Classics (Japan)

Fox Crime (stylized as FOXCRIME), was a television network, launched by the Fox Networks Group, which aired across several countries of Europe, Africa and Asia such as Italy, Portugal, Serbia, Bulgaria, and Turkey. Its basic programming including numerous television series, sitcoms and movies, among others, related to crime, horror and investigation.

It was first launched in Italy on 31 October 2004, the Balkans (which includes countries that previously part of Yugoslavia) and Bulgaria on 13 October 2006, Portugal on 28 September 2007, Hong Kong on 3 May 2008, Singapore on 2 October 2006, and in Vietnam on 29 October 2007. Fox Crime was also launched in the Philippines on 1 January 2008, on Sky Cable. In Indonesia, the channel was made available via Indovision in the middle of 2010. Later, it was launched in Thailand on 29 July 2010. Since 2016, Fox crime is available in MENACE Regions via AD Drama HD and via Elife in the United Arab Emirates.

FX and BabyTV channel was launched along with in India on March 25, 2009. Fox Channels India had received downlink strikes from the I&B Ministry of Italy for the three channels on March 12, 2009. However India and Sri Lanka were currently using the Asian Feed. Fox Crime HD was launched in Asia in May, 2016 via AsiaSat 5, in Latvia it was launched along with Fox Life and National Geographic Channel on October 1, 2011. In 2013 the channel was launched in Africa as part of StarSat. The channel in Africa officially closed on September 30, 2016, but FOX Crime continued broadcasting in Ages and Maindubs with a Portuguese version and in the following years various versions of Fox Crime were closed following Disney's acquisition of 21st Century Fox in 2019, were rebranded as Star Crime, based upon the Star hub on Disney+.

== Fox Crime around the world ==
Channel	Country or region	Launch year	Replacement / Rebrand	Shutdown year
Fox Crime (Italy)	Italy	October 31, 2005	Discontinued	July 1, 2021
Fox Crime (Japan)	Japan	October 1, 2006	Fox Classics	August 1, 2015
Fox Crime Adria	Balkans	October 13, 2006	Star Crime	October 1, 2023
Fox Crime (Bulgaria)	Bulgaria	October 13, 2006	Star Crime	October 1, 2023
Fox Crime (Portugal)	Portugal	September 26, 2007	Star Crime	February 7, 2024
Fox Crime (Russia and Baltics)	Russia	January 17, 2005	Fox	October 1, 2012
Fox Crime (Russia and Baltics)	Baltics	October 30, 2007	Fox	October 1, 2012
Fox Crime (Asia)	Asia	May 3, 2008	discontinued	October 1, 2021
Fox Crime (Spain)	Spain	February 15, 2010	Fox Life	October 1, 2014
Fox Crime (India)	India	July 2, 2010	Star Movies Select HD	April 18, 2015
Fox Crime (Norway)	Norway	March 21, 2011	Fox	July 1, 2013
Fox Crime (Turkey)	Turkey	November 11, 2011	discontinued	October 1, 2022
Fox Crime (Africa)	Africa	July 9, 2013	Fox Life	September 28, 2016
Fox Crime (Middle East)	Middle East and North Africa	September 28, 2017	discontinued	December 1, 2022

== See also ==
- Fox Crime (Australian TV channel)
- Fox Crime (Asian TV channel)
- Fox Crime (Italy)
