= Fox Classics (Japan) =

- Country: Japan

Programming
- Languages: English (main); Japanese (for advertising and others)

Ownership
- Owner: Fox Networks Group Asia Pacific
- Sister channels: Fox Sports and Entertainment; Fox (Japan); Fox Movies (Japan)

History
- Launched: October 2006 (as Fox Crime); 1 August 2015 (as Fox Classics)
- Closed: 30 September 2018
- Former names: Fox Crime (2006-2015)

Links
- Website: tv.foxjapan.com/classics

Fox Classics (formerly known as Fox Crime) was a Japanese pay television channel owned by Fox Networks Group Asia Pacific.

== History ==
=== As Fox Crime ===
The channel launched in October 2006 as Fox Crime.

=== As Fox Classics ===
On August 1, 2015, the channel was renamed as Fox Classics, and became broadcasting American dramas from the 1960s to the 2000s. The channel was renamed as Fox Classics on 1 August 2015.

The channel ceased broadcasting as of 30 September 2018.

== Programming ==
=== As Fox Classics ===
- Ally McBeal
- Beverly Hills, 90210
- Bewitched
- Charlie's Angels
- CHiPs
- The Closer
- Combat!
- Friends
- The Fugitive
- I Dream of Jeannie
- Knight Rider
- Law & Order: Special Victims Unit
- Little House on the Prairie
- MacGyver
- Major Crimes
- The X-Files
