= Josh Devoe =

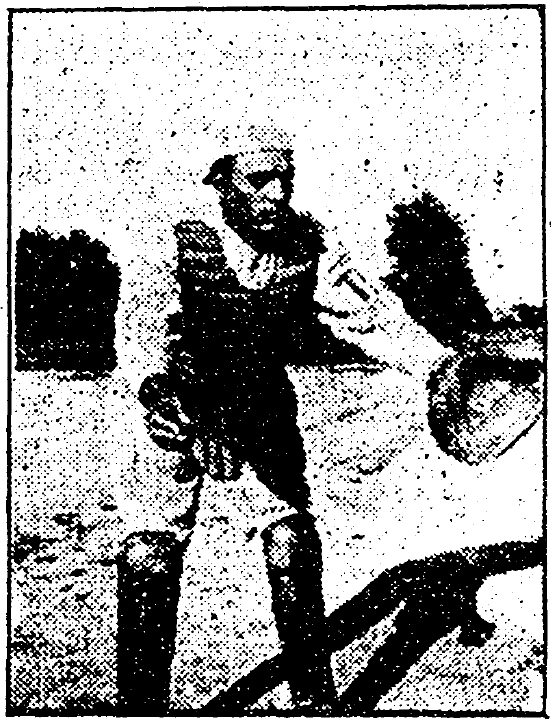
- 1920 Josh R. Devoe
- Catcher / Manager
- Born: March 24, 1888; Unknown
- Died: March 19, 1979 (aged 90); Los Angeles, California, U.S.
- Batted: Right Threw: Right

debut
- 1913, for the Honolulu Team

Last appearance
- 1920, for the Cleveland Tate Stars

Teams
- Honolulu Team (1913–1914); Chicago American Giants (1915); Crawford All Stars of Chicago (1916); Chicago Giants (1917–1919); Cleveland Tate Stars (1920)

James R. "Josh" Devoe (March 24, 1888 – March 19, 1979) was an American Negro leagues catcher and manager for several years before the founding of the first Negro National League, and in its first few seasons.

A Cleveland newspaper reporter in 1920 claimed Rube Foster said of Devoe he was "one of the smartest young players he ever trained."

== Post career ==
Devoe died in Los Angeles, California in 1979 at the age of 90.
