= Disney Jr. (international) =

Logo used since 2024

Disney Jr. is a children's television channel brand owned and operated by The Walt Disney Company, aimed at audiences aged 2 to 7 years old. It debuted in the United States on February 14, 2011 as a replacement for Playhouse Disney and has since expanded worldwide.

== Background ==
On September 28, 1999, the Playhouse Disney brand was extended internationally with the launch of a self-branded block on Disney Channel in the United Kingdom and Ireland. On September 29, 2000, Disney Television International expanded the block with the launch of a channel in the country alongside the launch of Toon Disney and Disney Channel +1 on the Sky Digital platform. On April 4, 2009, Egmont Group launched a companion Playhouse Disney magazine in the United Kingdom & Republic of Ireland that focused on the channel's four most popular shows: Mickey Mouse Clubhouse, My Friends Tigger & Pooh, Handy Manny and Little Einsteins. Each issue included "to do" pages and suggested activities for parents and children based on an educational theme. The Playhouse Disney block on Disney Channel UK & Republic of Ireland was eventually disposed of in July 2004 after reducing hours of programming. The Playhouse Disney channel available there, however, continued to air until it was replaced by Disney Junior on May 7, 2011.

On November 30, 2007, Astral Media launched a Canadian version of Playhouse Disney Channel under a brand licensing agreement with Disney-ABC Television Group (now Disney General Entertainment Content); the channel operated as a multiplex channel of Family Channel, which had long maintained a programming distribution agreement with Disney Channel for the domestic rights to the U.S. channel's series until January 2016. A Canadian-French version of Playhouse Disney was launched on July 5, 2010, also by Astral Media. The English & Canadian-French channels were both replaced by Disney Junior on May 6, 2011.

The first Disney Junior to launch outside the U.S. was in Latin America on April 1, 2011, replacing the Playhouse Disney Channel, it later rebranded in most countries replacing their Playhouse Disney brands mostly in 2011, such as Canada on May 6, the United Kingdom and Ireland on May 7, Italy on May 14, France on May 28, Australia and New Zealand on May 29, the pan-CEMA feed (Central and Eastern Europe, the Middle East, and Africa) on June 1, and Spain on June 11.

Japan and India's programming blocks were rebranded on July 3 and 4 respectively, with channels in Southeast Asia, Hong Kong and South Korea on July 11, along with Germany, Austria and Switzerland on July 14, Israel on July 18, and Scandinavia and the Benelux (Netherlands, Belgium, and Luxembourg) on September 10.

The Romanian channel launched on March 1, 2012, India and Japan's channels were also launched on October 1 and 15 respectively, It became available in Portugal since November 1, 2012, and Russia's block rebranded on September 1, 2013, concluding the Playhouse Disney brand.

The Hungarian feed was launched on July 1, 2015, but shut down in late 2017 due to lack of distributing for most of the Hungarian pay TV providers. It would plan to cease on October 12, but moved instead to December 5, discontinuing the Hungarian language audio track.

Disney Junior in Canada (both English and French), originally owned by WildBrain (at the time known as DHX Media), discontinued on September 18, 2015 as Corus Entertainment acquired Disney's rights in Canada. The English version relaunched on December 1, 2015, however, La Chaîne Disney's block, Disney Junior sur La Chaîne Disney, carries most preschool shows in French.

On April 1, 2019, Disney Junior discontinued in the Netherlands, while it continues broadcasting in Belgium (particularly the Flanders), however after a year of absence, most programs returned to Mickey Mornings on Disney Channel since November 17, 2020. Some Disney Junior channels were discontinued in favor of Disney+, such as Australia and New Zealand on April 30, 2020, Italy on May 1, and the United Kingdom and Ireland on October 1.

The same closure occurred in Malaysia on January 1, 2021, the German channel on September 30, Southeast Asia, Hong Kong and South Korea on October 1, Taiwan's programming block on Disney Channel on December 31, 2021, and the Brazilian feed on April 1, 2022, with the Russian block halted in December that year and in Scandinavia on April 1, 2024, due to the channel merging with Disney Channel to launch a new version of the channel.

The relaunch of Disney Jr. in Canada (along with La Chaîne Disney) closed down on September 1, 2025, due to existing financial pressure occurring at Corus Entertainment.

== Current channels ==
| Market | Type | Formerly | Launch date | Availability | Operator |
|---|---|---|---|---|---|
| United States | Channel | Soapnet^{a} | March 23, 2012 (except for DirecTV^{a}) | Nationwide | Disney Kids & Family |
| United States | Block (Mickey Mornings) | Playhouse | February 14, 2011 (as Disney Junior); June 1, 2020 (as Mickey Mornings) | Nationwide | Disney Kids & Family |
| Latin America | Channel (North) | Playhouse | June 1, 2008 (Playhouse); April 1, 2011 | Caribbean, Central America, Colombia, Mexico, Venezuela | Disney Media Networks Latin America |
| Latin America | Channel (South) | Playhouse | June 1, 2008 (Playhouse); April 1, 2011 | Argentina, Bolivia, Chile, Ecuador, Paraguay, Peru, Uruguay | Disney Media Networks Latin America |
| Argentina | Block on Telefe | —N/a | April 6, 2026 [1] | Argentina | Grupo Televisión Litoral |
| Wallonia | Channel | Playhouse | 2006 | Belgium, Luxembourg & Switzerland | The Walt Disney Company Limited |
| Wallonia | Channel (HD) | Playhouse | May 8, 2011 | Belgium, Luxembourg & Switzerland | The Walt Disney Company Limited |
| CEE, Middle East and Africa | Channel | Playhouse (except Bulgaria and Romania) | June 1, 2011; March 1, 2012 (Bulgaria and Romania) | Africa, Balkans, Baltics, Central and Eastern Europe, Middle East | The Walt Disney Company Limited |
| Japan | Block | Playhouse | July 3, 2011 | Nationwide | The Walt Disney Company (Japan) Ltd. |
| Japan | Channel | —N/a | October 1, 2012 | Nationwide | The Walt Disney Company (Japan) Ltd. |
| India | Block | Playhouse | 2006 (Playhouse); July 4, 2011 | India, Bhutan, Maldives, Nepal, Sri Lanka | Disney Star |
| India | Channel | —N/a | October 15, 2012 | India, Bhutan, Maldives, Nepal, Sri Lanka | Disney Star |
| Israel | Channel | Playhouse | September 9, 2009 (Playhouse); July 18, 2011 | Nationwide | The Walt Disney Company (Israel) Ltd. |
| Benelux | Channel | Playhouse | September 10, 2011 | Belgium; formerly Netherlands | The Walt Disney Company Limited |
| Portugal | Channel | Disney Cinemagic | November 1, 2012 | Portugal, Angola, Mozambique | The Walt Disney Company Portugal |
| Germany | Block (on Disney Channel in Germany; with Disney Jr. in Holland) | Junior | February 18, 2019 | Germany, Austria, Switzerland | Disney Co. (Germany) |
| Netherlands | Block (on Disney Channel in Germany; with Disney Jr. in Holland) | —N/a | November 17, 2020 | Nationwide | The Walt Disney Company (Benelux) BV |
| Netherlands | Channel (Timeshared daily with Veronica TV) | Disney XD | May 1, 2025 | None | Disney Channels (Benelux) B.V. |
| United Kingdom (relaunch) | Channel | —N/a | November 13, 2025 | United Kingdom, Ireland | The Walt Disney Company Limited |
| Italy (relaunch) | Channel | —N/a | December 1, 2025 | Italy, Malta, San Marino, Vatican City | The Walt Disney Company Italy |
| Spain | Block on Disney Channel | —N/a | April 1, 2026 | Nationwide | The Walt Disney Company Spain |
| Spain | Block on Clan | —N/a | October 31, 2025 | Nationwide | RTVE |

^aExcept for DirecTV, which replaced NASA TV, which moved to another channel and is still airing today. In DirecTV's case, Soapnet was replaced by an infomercial channel.

== Defunct channels ==
| Market | | Type | Formerly | Launch date | Discontinued date | Operator |
|---|---|---|---|---|---|---|
| Romania | | Block | Playhouse Disney Channel | September 2009 (Playhouse); June 1, 2011 | February 29, 2012 | The Walt Disney Company Limited |
| Portugal | | Block | Playhouse Disney Channel | September 15, 2003 | June 2014 | The Walt Disney Company Iberia |
| Canada (original) | | Channel | Playhouse Disney Channel | November 30, 2007 (Playhouse); May 6, 2011 | September 18, 2015 | Under a brand licensing agreement by DHX Media |
| Canada (original) | | Channel (French) | Playhouse Disney Télé | July 5, 2010 (Playhouse); May 6, 2011 | September 18, 2015 | Under a brand licensing agreement by DHX Media |
| Hungary | | Block on Disney Channel | Playhouse | 2011 | July 1, 2015 | The Walt Disney Company Limited |
| Hungary | | Channel | As a block on Disney Channel | July 1, 2015 | December 5, 2017 | The Walt Disney Company Limited |
| Asia | | As a block on Disney Channel | Playhouse | 2000 (Playhouse); July 11, 2011 | July 31, 2018 | The Walt Disney Company (Southeast Asia) Pte. Ltd. |
| Netherlands (original) | | Channel | Playhouse | September 10, 2011 | April 1, 2019 | The Walt Disney Company Limited |
| Latin America | | As a block on Disney Channel (3 feeds) | Playhouse | April 1, 2011 | May 1, 2019 | Disney Media Networks Latin America |
| Australia & New Zealand | | Channel | Playhouse | December 5, 2005 (Playhouse); May 29, 2011 | April 30, 2020 | The Walt Disney Company (Australia) Pty Ltd. |
| Italy (original) | | Channel | Playhouse | May 1, 2005 (Playhouse); May 14, 2011 | May 1, 2020 | The Walt Disney Company Italy |
| Italy (original) | | Channel (+1) | Playhouse +1 | July 31, 2009 (Playhouse +1); May 14, 2011 | May 1, 2020 | The Walt Disney Company Italy |
| United Kingdom & Ireland (original) | | Channel | Playhouse | September 29, 2000 (Playhouse); May 7, 2011 | October 1, 2020 | The Walt Disney Company (UK) Limited |
| United Kingdom & Ireland (original) | | Channel (+1) | Playhouse +1 | November 3, 2007 (Playhouse +1); May 7, 2011 | October 1, 2020 | The Walt Disney Company (UK) Limited |
| United Kingdom & Ireland (original) | | Channel (HD) | Playhouse | 2011 | October 1, 2020 | The Walt Disney Company (UK) Limited |
| Latin America | | As a block on Fox Channel (2 feeds) | As a block on Disney Channel (3 feeds) | March 21, 2020 | February 22, 2021 | Disney Media Networks Latin America |
| Germany | | Channel | Playhouse | July 14, 2011 | September 30, 2021 | The Walt Disney Company Limited |
| Asia | Singapore | Channel | Playhouse | March 15, 2004 (Playhouse); July 11, 2011 | June 1, 2020 | The Walt Disney Company (Southeast Asia) Pte. Ltd. |
| Asia | Malaysia | Channel | Playhouse | July 3, 2004 (Playhouse); July 11, 2011 | December 31, 2020 | The Walt Disney Company (Southeast Asia) Pte. Ltd. |
| Asia | Hong Kong | Channel | Playhouse | April 2, 2004 (Playhouse); July 11, 2011 | October 1, 2021 | The Walt Disney Company (Southeast Asia) Pte. Ltd. |
| Asia | Indonesia | Channel | Playhouse | April 2, 2004 (Playhouse); July 11, 2011 | October 1, 2021 | The Walt Disney Company (Southeast Asia) Pte. Ltd. |
| Asia | Palau | Channel | Playhouse | January 2005 (Playhouse); July 11, 2011 | October 1, 2021 | The Walt Disney Company (Southeast Asia) Pte. Ltd. |
| Asia | Thailand | Channel | Playhouse | January 2005 (Playhouse); July 11, 2011 | October 1, 2021 | The Walt Disney Company (Southeast Asia) Pte. Ltd. |
| Asia | Vietnam | Channel | Playhouse | May 2005 (Playhouse); July 11, 2011 | October 1, 2021 | The Walt Disney Company (Southeast Asia) Pte. Ltd. |
| Asia | Cambodia | Channel | Playhouse | June 20, 2005 (Playhouse); July 11, 2011 | October 1, 2021 | The Walt Disney Company (Southeast Asia) Pte. Ltd. |
| Asia | Philippines | Channel | Playhouse | December 2005 (Playhouse); July 11, 2011 | October 1, 2021 | The Walt Disney Company (Southeast Asia) Pte. Ltd. |
| South Korea | | Channel | Playhouse | June 12, 2004 (Playhouse); July 11, 2011 | October 1, 2021 | Disney Channels Korea Ltd. |
| Taiwan | | Block | Playhouse | 2004 (Playhouse); September 1, 2011 | December 31, 2021 | The Walt Disney Company (Taiwan) Ltd. |
| Russia | | Block (Mickey Mornings) | Playhouse | August 2010 (Playhouse); September 1, 2013 (Disney Junior); May 1, 2020 (Mickey Mornings) | December 13, 2022 | Media-1 (80%), The Walt Disney Company CIS (20%) |
| Scandinavia | | Channel | Playhouse | 2006 (Playhouse); September 11, 2011 | March 1, 2024 (Denmark); April 1, 2024 | The Walt Disney Company Nordic |
| France | | Channel | Playhouse | November 2, 2002 (Playhouse); May 28, 2011 | January 1, 2025 (France) | The Walt Disney Company Limited |
| Brazil | | Channel | Playhouse | September 5, 2008 (Playhouse); April 1, 2011 (Disney Junior) | April 1, 2022 | The Walt Disney Company Brazil |
| Brazil | | Block | Playhouse | 2002 (Playhouse); April 1, 2011 (Disney Junior nas manhãs no Disney Channel) | February 28, 2025 | The Walt Disney Company Brazil |
| Canada (relaunch) | | Channel | —N/a | December 1, 2015 | September 1, 2025 | Corus Entertainment |
| Canada (relaunch) | | Block (French) on Disney | —N/a | December 1, 2015 | September 1, 2025 | Corus Entertainment |
| Spain | | Channel | Playhouse | November 16, 2001 (Playhouse); June 11, 2011 | April 1, 2026 | The Walt Disney Company Limited |

== See also ==
- List of programs broadcast by Disney Jr.
- Disney Xtreme Digital, a video streaming service on Disney.com
