= Star Mundo =

- Country: Angola; Mozambique
- Headquarters: Lisbon, Portugal

Programming
- Language: Portuguese
- Picture format: 1080i HDTV (downscaled to 16:9 576i for the SDTV feed)

Ownership
- Owner: The Walt Disney Company Portugal
- Parent: The Walt Disney Company Iberia S.L.
- Sister channels: Star Channel; Star Life; Star Crime; Star Comedy; Star Movies; 24Kitchen; National Geographic; Nat Geo Wild; BabyTV

History
- Launched: 23 October 2015; 10 years ago
- Former names: Mundo Fox (2015-2024)

Links
- Website: startv.pt (in Portuguese)

Star Mundo is an African pay television channel, launched on October 23, 2015, as the regional variant of the MundoFox. It is only available in Angola and Mozambique and its programming is entirely in the Portuguese language. In addition to screening dubbed foreign television series, the channel also airs some local productions, mostly funded by Portuguese production companies.

== History ==
Former logo

Mundo Fox started broadcasting on October 23, 2015, with an all-Lusophone line-up. Among the content at launching time was the Portuguese telenovela Doce Tentação, the reality show Lucky Ladies and programming made specifically for the Angolan market, the first such format being A Sentada, a cooking show.

The launch of the channel was celebrated with a public presentation of its contents at the Presidente hotel in Luanda. The channel's DStv slot at launch was 500.

For the 2017-2018 television season, the channel premiered a new season of Tropa d'Os Tuneza, the channel's stand-up show, in a VIP format, with Angolan celebrities.

On November 27, 2023, Disney has announced that Fox channels (including Mundo Fox, Fox, Fox Crime, Fox Life, Fox Comedy and Fox Movies) would rebrand to "Star" on 7 February 2024.

== Programming ==
=== Current Programming ===
- American Dad!
- The Big Bang Theory
- Seinfeld
- The Simpsons

=== Original productions ===
- A Sentada (2015)
- Banga Shopping (Tuneza)
- Duelo das Estrelas
- Maison Afrochic
- M'bora Dividir
- O Bar do Gilmário

=== Former Programming ===
- 9-1-1
- CSI: Vegas
- Espelho d'Água
- FBI
- FBI: Most Wanted
- Magnum P.I. (2018 TV series)
- Modern Family
- NCIS Hawaii
- NCIS: Los Angeles
- The Neighbors
- The Resident

== See also ==
- Star Channel
- The Walt Disney Company Portugal
