= The Walt Disney Company Portugal =

Portuguese division of The Walt Disney Company

- Trade name: Disney Portugal
- Formerly: Fox International Channels Portugal (2003-2016); Fox Networks Group Portugal (2016-2020)
- Company type: Subsidiary
- Industry: Television
- Founded: 2003; 23 years ago
- Headquarters: Lisbon, Portugal
- Area served: Portugal; Angola; Cape Verde; Mozambique; São Tomé and Príncipe
- Products: Television channels
- Owner: The Walt Disney Company Iberia S.L.
- Parent: The Walt Disney Company EMEA (Disney Entertainment)
- Website: www.disney.pt

The Walt Disney Company Portugal (formerly Fox Networks Group Portugal) was created in 2003 with headquarters located in Lisbon, Portugal, and is the owner of many Portuguese versions of Disney channels.

== History ==
The group's first localized channel, Fox, started on March 1, 2003.

In 2005, Fox and Fox Life launched on TV Cabo's Funtastic Life package with the aim of attracting more subscribers to its digital network. Investment in the channels was strong, without revealing the exact amount of money invested in marketing actions, acquisition of formats or the creation of a local team. It already had set a strategy to launch more channels in Portugal.

A channel for Angola and Mozambique, Mundo Fox, started in October 2015.

In January 2016, 21st Century Fox announced reorganization of Fox International Channels Portugal. The heads of FIC's regional divisions was report to CEO Peter Rice and COO Randy Freer at Fox Networks Group in the United States, instead of the outgoing FIC CEO Hernan Lopez and division was renamed Fox Networks Group Portugal.

On 20 March 2019, The Walt Disney Company acquired 21st Century Fox, including Fox Networks Group Portugal and then rebranded and reorganized it to The Walt Disney Company Portugal in 2020.

On November 27, 2023, Disney has announced that Fox branded channels would rebrand to Star on 7 February 2024.

== Channels ==
=== Current ===
- Disney Channel (HD)
- Disney Jr. (HD)
- Star Channel (HD)
- Star Life (HD)
- Star Crime (HD)
- Star Comedy (HD)
- Star Movies (HD)
- Star Mundo (HD) (Only in Angola and Mozambique)
- National Geographic (HD)
- National Geographic Wild (HD)
- 24 Kitchen (HD)
- BabyTV (HD)

=== Former ===
- Disney Cinemagic (defunct)
- Fuel TV (Portugal) (HD, sold to FYC)
- BemSimples (defunct)
- Nat Geo Music (defunct)
- Nat Geo People (defunct)
- Fox News Channel (formerly distributed, owned by Fox Corporation)
- Sky News (formerly distributed, owned by Sky)
- Phoenix Chinese News and Entertainment Channel (formerly distributed)
- Phoenix InfoNews Channel (formerly distributed)

== See also ==
- Disney Media Networks Latin America
