= The Walt Disney Company Iberia =

Iberian division of The Walt Disney Company

The Walt Disney Company Iberia, S.L.
- Trade name: The Walt Disney Company Spain & Portugal
- Type: Subsidiary
- Industry: Media conglomerate
- Founded: 1999; 27 years ago
- Headquarters: Madrid, Spain; Lisbon, Portugal
- Area served: Portugal; Spain
- Key people: Mariana Baroso (president for Portuguese region); Simon Amselem (president for Spanish region)
- Products: Television; Streaming services
- Parent: The Walt Disney Company EMEA
- Divisions: The Walt Disney Studios España
- Website: https://disney.pt/ (Portuguese region); https://disney.es/ (Spanish region)

The Walt Disney Company Iberia is one subsidiary of The Walt Disney Company EMEA, one of The Walt Disney Company's international divisions. It is responsible for the Disney brand and its businesses throughout the region. It has offices in Portugal and Spain.

The company owns and operates the Portuguese versions of Disney Channel, Disney Jr. and National Geographic, and the Spanish versions of Disney Channel and National Geographic. The Walt Disney Company Iberia also produces content as well with other media companies.

== Assets ==
=== Home video and Television production companies ===
- Buena Vista International, Inc.

=== TV channels in Portugal ===
- Disney Channel
- Disney Jr.
- Star Channel
- Star Life
- Star Crime
- Star Comedy
- Star Movies
- Star Mundo (only in Angola and Mozambique)
- 24Kitchen
- National Geographic
- National Geographic Wild
- BabyTV

=== TV channels in Spain ===
- Disney Channel
- Star Channel
- National Geographic
- National Geographic Wild
- BabyTV

=== Streaming services ===
- Disney+

== The Walt Disney Company Portugal ==
The Walt Disney Company Portugal is the Portuguese division of The Walt Disney Company Iberia that operates, distributes and markets the company's channels in Portugal.

== Former assets ==
- Disney Jr. Spain – Closed and replaced by the relaunch of Disney Channel on April 1, 2026
- Disney XD Spain – Closed on April 1, 2020
- Disney Cinemagic Portugal – Closed and replaced by Disney Jr. on November 1, 2012
- Disney Cinemagic Spain – Closed on January 1, 2015
- Movistar Disney – Closed on March 31, 2020
- Fox Life Spain – Closed on January 1, 2022
- Viajar – Closed on January 1, 2022
- BemSimples Portugal – Closed on June 1, 2014
- Nat Geo Music Portugal – Closed in 2017
- Nat Geo People – Replaced by National Geographic Wild
- Fox News Channel – Formerly distributed in Portugal
- Sky News – Formerly distributed in Portugal
- Phoenix Chinese News and Entertainment Channel – Formerly distributed in Portugal
- Phoenix Infonews Channel – Formerly distributed in Portugal
- Fuel TV Portugal – sold to FYC
- 20th Century Fox Home Entertainment
- Walt Disney Studios Home Entertainment – Disney discontinued physical home media distribution in Portugal and Spain
- Disney Channel App – Discontinued on February 28, 2020
