= Fox Next =

FOX:Next
- Country: Portugal
- Broadcast area: Portugal

Programming
- Language: Portuguese
- Picture format: 4:3
- Timeshift service: Fox:Next +1

Ownership
- Owner: Fox
- Parent: 21st Century Fox (News Corporation)
- Sister channels: FOX; FOX Life; FOX Crime; FX; National Geographic Channel; Fuel TV; FOX News Channel; BabyTV; Nat Geo Music; Nat Geo Wild; Nat Geo Adventure; REN TV

History
- Launched: April 14, 2008
- Closed: June 30, 2011
- Replaced by: Fox Movies

Links
- Website: foxnext.canais-fox.pt (in Portuguese)

Fox:Next (stylized as FOX:NEXT) was a television channel operated by Fox International Channels in Portugal. Its programming was focused on television series and movies, with its core target being viewers of the 25-44 demographic, covering a variety of genres.

== History ==
The channel was launched in Portugal on April 14, 2008, as part of the MEO package line-up. It was also available on ZON TVCabo, Cabovisão, Vodafone Casa TV and Optimus Clix TV from 2010.

At launch, Fox Next held four exclusive American premieres: Mad Men, 30 Rock, Terminator: The Sarah Connor Chronicles and Big Shots. Primetime slots on the channel were arranged with a series at 9:30pm followed by a movie at 10:15pm. On weeknights, the show and the movie formed a theme night. Mondays were dedicated to drama, Tuesdays to romance, Wednesdays to lust, Thursdays to action and Fridays to comedy. The channel was launched as a MEO exclusive following the launch of Sony Entertainment Television and Animax the week before. Some of the shows on the channel were already broadcast before on other Fox channels or on terrestrial television, such as The O.C., Battlestar Galactica and Everybody Hates Chris. The channel was the eleventh overall launched by Fox International Channels, causing Portugal to become the second country with the most channels from the company in Europe, behind Italy.

For the premiere of the second season of Mad Men, the channel held a two-day (October 13 and 14, 2008) promotional campaign in Lisbon where criars promoted a promotional publication (Mad Men News) depicting topics from the 1960s (decade where the series was set) and the new season. The first season was to be repeated on October 11 and 12.

In October 2009, it was announced that Fox Next was going to start broadcasts on ZON in January 2010. At the time, it was the only Fox channel not on the platform.

On July 1, 2011, coinciding with the first broadcasts of the Fox SD channels in widescreen, the channel was replaced by Fox Movies.

== Programming ==
- 30 Rock
- Angels in America
- Battlestar Galactica
- Big Love
- Big Shot
- Boston Legal
- Boston Public
- Eastwick
- Easy Money
- Everybody Hates Chris
- Filhos do Carnaval
- Foxy Lady
- House of Saddam
- Hung
- In Treatment
- John Adams
- Kings
- Legend of the Seeker
- Mad Men
- My Wife and Kids
- Nurse Jackie
- The O.C.
- Pushing Daisies
- Saving Grace
- Six Feet Under
- Smallville
- Terminator: The Sarah Connor Chronicles
- The West Wing
