= National Geographic Portugal =

- Country: Spain; Portugal
- Broadcast area: Portugal; Angola; Mozambique; Cape Verde; Barbados
- Headquarters: Madrid, Spain; Lisbon, Portugal

Programming
- Picture format: 1080i HDTV (downscaled to 16:9 576i for the SDTV feed)

Ownership
- Owner: The Walt Disney Company Portugal
- Parent: The Walt Disney Company Iberia S.L.
- Sister channels: Nat Geo Wild; Disney Channel; Star Channel; Star Comedy; Star Life; Star Crime; Star Movies; 24Kitchen; BabyTV

History
- Launched: January 2001

Links
- Website: http://www.natgeo.pt/

National Geographic Portugal is a Portuguese pay television channel that features documentaries produced by the National Geographic Society, owned by The Walt Disney Company Portugal. It competes with other widely available cable channels, the Discovery Channel and Odisseia.
