= Disney Jr. (Portugal) =

Portuguese television channel

- Logo used since 1 June 2024
- Country: United Kingdom (license); Portugal (playout)
- Broadcast area: Portugal; Angola; Cape Verde; Mozambique
- Headquarters: 3 Queen Caroline Street, Hammersmith, London (license); Lisbon, Portugal (playout)

Programming
- Languages: European Portuguese (dubbing/subtitles); English (subtitled in European Portuguese)
- Picture format: HDTV 1080i SDTV 576i (downscaled)

Ownership
- Owner: The Walt Disney Company Limited (license); The Walt Disney Company Portugal (playout)
- Parent: The Walt Disney Company Iberia S.L. Disney Kids & Family (Disney Entertainment)
- Sister channels: Disney Channel (Portugal); Star Channel (Portugal); National Geographic (Portugal)

History
- Launched: 1 October 2008; 18 years ago (as Disney Cinemagic); 1 November 2012; 14 years ago (as Disney Junior)
- Replaced: Disney Cinemagic
- Closed: 1 January,2027(Portugal)
- Replaced by: Boing
- Former names: Disney Cinemagic (2008-2012); Disney Junior (2012-2024)

Links
- Website: tv.disney.pt/programacao/disney-junior

Disney Jr. is a British-managed Portuguese pay television channel operated by The Walt Disney Company Portugal; part of The Walt Disney Company Iberia. Aimed mainly at children between 2 and 7 years of age, it was launched on 1 October 2008 as Disney Cinemagic and Disney Junior launched on 1 November 2012, replacing Disney Cinemagic. Along with the new channel, Disney launched "Disney Movies On Demand" service on ZON.

In March 2021, a high definition feed was launched on the TV operator MEO.

== Logos ==
2019–2024

2024–present
