= Star Comedy =

- Star Comedy logo
- Country: Portugal
- Broadcast area: Portugal; Angola; Mozambique; Cape Verde
- Headquarters: Lisbon

Programming
- Picture format: 1080i HDTV (downscaled to 16:9 576i for the SDTV feed)

Ownership
- Owner: The Walt Disney Company Portugal
- Parent: The Walt Disney Company Iberia S.L.
- Sister channels: Star Channel; Star Life; Star Crime; Star Movies; Star Mundo; 24Kitchen; National Geographic; Nat Geo Wild; BabyTV

History
- Launched: September 26, 2007
- Former names: FX (2007-2015); Fox Comedy (2015-2024)

Links
- Website: startv.pt (in Portuguese)

Star Comedy (formerly FX and Fox Comedy) is a Portuguese pay television channel that broadcasts comedy series and films, owned by The Walt Disney Company Portugal. Programs are mostly imported, mainly from the United States, occasionally also Canada and the United Kingdom. The channel has become the home for primarily 20th Television Animation's shows such as The Simpsons and Family Guy, as well as long running acclaimed sitcoms like Friends and The Office. The name of the channel is derived from one of the multiplex Star Premium channels in Latin America which originally was used in 2021.

== History ==
=== As FX ===
The channel started broadcasting on September 26, 2007 alongside Fox Crime on TV Cabo's Funtastic Life package. The channel promised the start of "a new era in the Portuguese landscape" with a strong irreverent character reflected in the channel's slogan: Pós-Zapping. Unlike its sister channels, FX distanced from offering mainstream content, with the main offers being hit cult shows. The channel launched with the premiere of Dexter and also announced Deadwood (already broadcast on RTP2 before) in the channel's second week.

=== As Fox Comedy ===
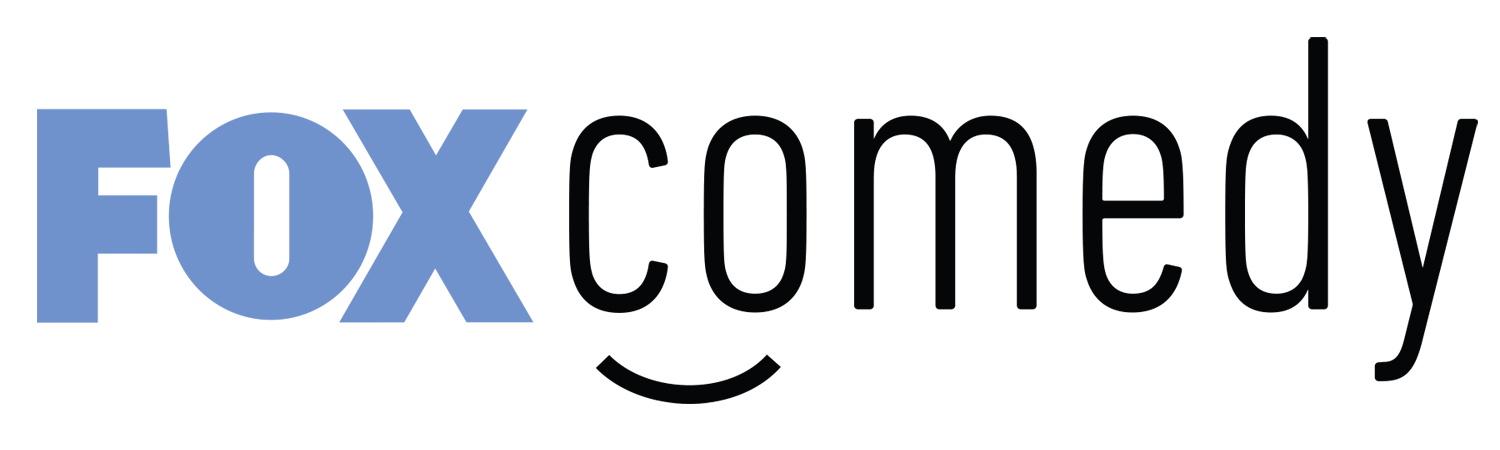
Second logo

On November 18, 2015, the channel finished its conversion to a comedy channel, Fox Comedy. In the process, all comedy shows on Fox Portugal (now Star Channel) were transferred to Fox Comedy, with Fox going forward, instead dedicating mostly to American police procedural television series.

=== As Star Comedy ===
On November 27, 2023, Disney has announced that Fox Comedy would rebrand to Star Comedy on February 7, 2024.

== Programming ==
Current programs include:

- 2 Broke Girls
- American Dad! (formerly on Fox and FX)
- The Big Bang Theory (formerly on RTP2, Animax and AXN White)
- Brooklyn Nine-Nine
- Family Guy (formerly on SIC Radical, RTP2, Fox and FX)
- Friends (formerly on RTP1, RTP2, SIC Mulher and Sony Entertainment Television)
- Ghosts
- How I Met Your Mother (formerly on Fox and Fox Life)
- Last Man Standing (formerly on Fox Life)
- The Office (US) (formerly on TVI and FX)
- Rules of Engagement (formerly on AXN White)
- The Simpsons (formerly on Canal 1/RTP1, RTP2, RTP Açores, RTP Madeira, Fox and FX)
- Two and a Half Men (formerly on RTP1, RTP2, AXN and AXN White)

=== Former programs ===
==== As Fox Comedy ====
- A Criada Malcriada
- Abbott Elementary
- American Housewife
- Animal Control
- Atlanta
- Baby Daddy (formerly on AXN White)
- Black-ish
- Bob's Burgers (formerly on RTP2, Fox and FX)
- The Cleveland Show (formerly on Fox and FX)
- Crayon Shin-chan (in dubbed and subtitled versions, formerly on SIC, Animax and Panda Biggs/Biggs)
- Cristela
- Curb Your Enthusiasm (formerly on RTP2 and FX)
- Duncanville
- Episodes (formerly on FX)
- Fresh Off the Boat
- Futurama (formerly on RTP2, Fox and FX)
- Ghosts
- The Goldbergs
- The Grinder
- Kevin Can Wait
- Life in Pieces
- Malcolm in the Middle (formerly on Fox and SIC Radical)
- Marlon
- The Mick
- The Middle (formerly on Fox Life and RTP2)
- Mike & Molly (formerly on AXN White)
- The Mindy Project
- Modern Family (formerly on Fox Life and on TVI)
- Mom (formerly on RTP2)
- The Neighborhood
- The Neighbors (formerly on Fox)
- New Girl (formerly on Fox Life and also on TVI)
- One Day at a Time
- The Orville
- Porta dos Fundos (formerly on Fox)
- Raising Hope (formerly on Fox Life)
- Seinfeld (formerly on TVI, SIC Radical and SIC Comédia)
- Son of Zorn
- Speechless
- Superstore
- Will & Grace

==== As FX ====
Former logo as FX

- 1600 Penn
- 30 Rock (formerly on Fox Next)
- American Gladiators
- American Horror Story
- Archer
- Arrested Development
- Australian Gladiators
- Better Off Ted
- Big Love (formerly on Fox Next)
- Brickleberry
- Brotherhood
- Bullrun
- Californication
- Call Me Fitz
- Chappelle's Show
- Deadwood
- Dexter
- Dilbert
- Dirt
- Don't Trust the B— in Apartment 23
- Duckman
- Eli's Dirty Jokes
- Eureka
- Extras
- Fear Factor
- Fear Itself
- Flight of the Conchords
- Free Radio
- Gary & Mike
- Gladiators (UK)
- The Goode Family
- Happy Tree Friends
- Head Case
- Hulk Hogan's Celebrity Championship Wrestling
- Hung (formerly on Fox Next)
- It's Always Sunny in Philadelphia
- Kenny vs. Spenny
- King of the Hill
- The Knights of Prosperity
- La La Land
- The League
- The Life & Times of Tim
- Lights Out
- Little Britain USA
- Louie
- Man Up!
- Miami Vice (formerly on RTP1 and RTP Memória)
- The Mind of the Married Man
- Mission Hill
- Monk
- Moral Orel
- Monster Knockouts
- My Name Is Earl (formerly on RTP2)
- The New Normal
- No Signal!
- Nurse Jackie (formerly on Fox Next)
- NYPD Blue
- The Oblongs
- Party Down
- Playmakers
- PokerStars
- Psych
- The Riches
- The Ren & Stimpy Show (formerly on SIC and Nickelodeon)
- Reno 911!
- Scrubs
- Secret Diary of a Call Girl
- Sleeper Cell
- Solitary
- Son of the Beach (formerly on SIC Radical)
- Sons of Anarchy
- Sons of Tucson
- Special Ops Mission
- Sports Night
- Strikeforce
- Twin Peaks
- Underbelly
- Unhitched
- Unsupervised
- The Walking Dead
- Wilfred
- Wipeout Australia
- Wipeout Canada
- Wipeout (UK)
- Wipeout (US)
- The X-Files (formerly on TVI)
- Z Rock

== See also ==
- FX (TV Channel)
- Fox Comedy
- Star Premium, where Star Comedy name originated
