= Star Channel (Portugal) =

- Country: Portugal
- Broadcast area: Portugal; Angola; Mozambique; Cape Verde
- Headquarters: Lisbon, Portugal

Programming
- Picture format: 1080i HDTV (downscaled to 16:9 576i for the SDTV feed)

Ownership
- Owner: The Walt Disney Company Portugal
- Parent: The Walt Disney Company Iberia S.L.
- Sister channels: Star Life; Star Crime; Star Comedy; Star Movies; 24Kitchen; Star Mundo; Disney Channel; National Geographic; Nat Geo Wild; BabyTV

History
- Launched: March 1, 2003
- Former names: Fox (2003-2024)

Links
- Website: startv.pt (in Portuguese)

Star Channel (previously known as Fox) is a Portuguese pay television channel. It primarily specializes in American television series and feature films. Since 2019, it is owned by Walt Disney Company. Its main competitor is AXN.

In the past (until 2015), the channel also aired comedies; these were later moved to the Portuguese feed of FX, which in November 2015 was renamed Fox Comedy.

== History ==
=== As Fox ===
Former logo used from 2019 to 2024

In February 2003, it was announced that Fox would start broadcasting on Cabovisão from March 1, one of the cable companies that existed at the time, as an exclusive channel to the platform. Cristina Gomez, director-general of Cabovisão, explained to the Lusa news agency that the channel was "a unique experience in Portugal", combining "the greatest hits from the Fox studio, some Portuguese movies and the most important television series". The primary target was defined as viewers in the 18-45 age range, with the aim of leading the entertainment segment in Portugal, similar to what happened in Latin America and Japan, despite the reduced coverage of Cabovisão, which had 17% of the share of the pay-TV operators at the time, against 80% from TV Cabo. The channel promised television series already broadcast in Portugal, as well as some new series that were exclusive to the channel at the time: The Simpsons, The X-Files, Family Guy, King of the Hill, Alien Nation, Batman, L.A. Law, The Pretender and Lou Grant. From the start, the channel would broadcast 18 hours a day, from 9am to 3am. Usually, most of these hit series were shown on late night slots on terrestrial networks. Portugal was a key market for the European expansion of the brand, primarily due to the fact that Portuguese viewers have long since been used to watch television series in their original soundtrack with subtitles.

On September 27, 2004, the channel premiered Las Vegas.

The channel's reach increased in May 2005, when it launched on the TV Cabo platform in its then-new Funtastic Life package. The channel was temporarily available to analog subscribers before moving to Funtastic Life as an exclusive in June 2005. Regional director-general of FOX International Channels Sónia Jackson said that it and the newly-launched FOX Life would "attract customers to the digital network". The fact that it was exclusive to the Funtastic Life package was merely strategic. Within more than three years from launching, the channel's ratings increased significantly, becoming the fourth most-watched cable network, behind AXN, SIC Notícias and Canal Panda. The launch on TV Cabo in 2005 enabled the channel to be measured by Marktest. The channel had increased from 1,400 viewers at launch to close to 12,000 in October 2006 alone. That same month, the average number of viewers that accessed the channel for at least one second stood at 620,000, which at the time was a record high. Occasionally, the channel was made available to analog subscribers due to special actions by TV Cabo.

The network in 2006 premiered Invasion on February 21, 2006 with RTP securing terrestrial rights for the series later in the year. On November 2, 2006, the channel premiered Prison Break, when the network was available free for subscribers of the basic digital service of TV Cabo for two months. During this period the channel also premiered The Unit (November 7, it and Prison Break were secured for RTP), Tru Calling (November 11, already broadcast by RTP2), My Name Is Earl (December 3), American Dad! (December 3) and Bones (December 13).

Fox secured rights to the 34th season of Saturday Night Live in April 2009.

The channel was made available to DStv subscribers in Angola and Mozambique to subscribers of the DStv Bué package on February 26, 2009. In the same year, a print advertisement promoting The Simpsons appeared in Angola depicting a localized version of the family, for the "premiere" of the series in the country.

The HD feed of the channel launched on MEO on July 31, 2009. Portugal became the third region to introduce the feed after Italy and Latin America. The HD feed later expanded to other providers.

On February 1, 2010, the channel was made available to ZON's analog and digital basic subscriber bases, the former as part of a realignment of the analog offer.

The channel broadcast the finale of Lost almost simultaneously with the US broadcast on the early hours (5 to 7am) of May 24, 2010. The simulcast had audio problems on the HD feed. The episode repeated on June 1.

The premiere of The Walking Dead was marked by a campaign held on October 26, 2010 involving a zombie invasion in Lisbon and advertising in universities in Lisbon, Oporto and Coimbra to attract the university student viewing target. The series premiered on November 2, 2010, two days after the American premiere. A similar campaign in was held in early 2011 for the premiere of Hawaii Five-0, involving an interpretation of the series' opening theme and Hawaiian dancers.

For the tenth anniversary in March 2013, the channel used the international I Love Fox campaign.

For Carnaval 2015 (which fell on February 17), the channel premiered the TV version of Porta dos Fundos. Fox set the date as National Hangover Day, and aired the first episode sideways on purpose, to target "hungover viewers".

To promote the second half of the tenth season of The Walking Dead, a campaign was held on Hi5 in February 2020, reviving the social network.

=== As Star Channel ===
On November 27, 2023, Disney has announced that Fox would rebrand to Star Channel on 7 February 2024. The visual concept is of a "luminous shooting star" that will guide the viewers through its programming. The programming will remain mostly unchanged. The full version of the rebrand song, A Brilliant Change was revealed on January 5, 2024. The campaign used in the EMEA region was developed and implemented by The Walt Disney Company's Portuguese marketing and communications team.

== Shows ==
=== Current programming ===
- CSI: Crime Scene Investigation
- CSI: Miami
- Chicago P.D
- FBI
- FBI: Most Wanted
- Found
- Hawaii Five-0 (Hawai Força Especial)
- NCIS: Los Angeles (Investigação Criminal: Los Angeles)
- NCIS: Sydney (Investigação Criminal: Sydney)
- Rules of Engagement (formerly on AXN White and Star Comedy)
- SEAL Team

In addition to the above, the channel also airs feature films on weekends.

=== Former programming ===
- 24
- The 4400
- Agents of S.H.I.E.L.D.
- Alaska Daily
- Alien Nation
- American Dad!
- American Horror Story
- The Americans
- Angel
- Batman
- Being Human (Humanos)
- Blindspot
- Bones (Ossos)
- Breakout Kings (Os Reis da Fuga)
- The Bridge
- Buffy the Vampire Slayer (Buffy, Caçadora de Vampiros)
- Burn Notice (Espião Fora-de-Jogo)
- Californication
- Camelot
- The Cell
- The Chicago Code
- The Cleaner
- The Cleveland Show
- Cold Case
- Covert Affairs (Agente Dupla)
- Crusoe (Crusoé)
- CSI: Vegas
- Da Vinci's Demons
- Day Break
- The Dead Zone
- The Defenders (Defesa à Las Vegas)
- Defying Gravity (Gravidade Zero)
- Desperate Housewives (Donas de Casa Desesperadas)
- Dexter
- The Dresden Files
- Elementary
- Elsbeth
- The Equalizer
- Eureka
- Family Guy
- FBI: International
- The Finder
- Fire Country
- Flashpoint
- The Forgotten
- Fringe
- Futurama
- The Gates
- Ghost Whisperer (Em Contacto)
- The Glades
- Gotham
- Harper's Island (A Ilha)
- Heroes
- Homeland (Segurança Nacional)
- House
- How I Met Your Mother (Foi Assim que Aconteceu) (formerly on Fox Life)
- Huff
- Invasion (Invasão)
- The Irrational
- It's Always Sunny in Philadelphia (Nunca Chove em Filadélfia) (formerly on FX)
- John Doe
- King of the Hill
- The Killing
- L.A. Law
- Las Vegas
- Lie to Me
- Life on Mars
- The Listener
- Lost (Perdidos)
- Lou Grant
- Law & Order (Lei & Ordem)
- Law & Order: Special Victims Unit (Lei & Ordem: Unidade Especial)
- Magnum P.I.
- Major Crimes (Crimes Graves)
- Malcolm in the Middle (A Vida é Injusta)
- Mental
- Miami Medical
- Minority Report
- Modern Family (Uma Família Muito Moderna)
- Moonlight
- My Name Is Earl (O Meu Nome É Earl)
- NCIS: Hawaiʻi (Investigação Criminal: Hawaiʻi)
- Nikita
- The O.C. (The O.C. - Na Terra dos Ricos)
- One Day at a Time
- Person of Interest
- Persons Unknown (Desconhecidos)
- The Pretender
- Prison Break
- The Prisoner (O Prisioneiro)
- Safe
- Saturday Night Live
- Saved
- Scandal
- Scorpion
- Scrubs (Médicos e Estagiários)
- Shameless (No Limite)
- The Simpsons (Os Simpsons)
- Six Feet Under (Sete Palmos de Terra)
- Sleepy Hollow
- Smallville
- Southland
- Spartacus
- Stargate Atlantis
- The Strain
- Touch
- Tracker
- Tru Calling (Tru Calling: O Apelo)
- Tyrant
- The Unit
- V
- The Walking Dead
- The West Wing (Os Homens do Presidente)
- White Collar (Apanha-me se Puderes)
- The X-Files (Ficheiros Secretos)
