= Disney Jr. (UK & Ireland) =

British children's pay television channel

- Logo used since 13 November 2025
- Country: United Kingdom
- Broadcast area: United Kingdom, Ireland, Malta
- Headquarters: Hammersmith, London, United Kingdom

Programming
- Picture format: 1080i HDTV
- Timeshift service: Disney Junior +1 (original)

Ownership
- Owner: The Walt Disney Company Limited; Disney Channels Worldwide (Walt Disney Direct-to-Consumer & International)
- Sister channels: Disney+ Cinema BabyTV National Geographic Nat Geo Wild

History
- Launched: 29 September 2000; 26 years ago (original, as Playhouse Disney); 7 May 2011; 15 years ago (original, as Disney Junior); 13 November 2025; 11 months ago (relaunch, as Disney Jr.)
- Closed: 1 October 2020; 6 years ago (original)
- Replaced by: Disney+ (original)
- Former names: Playhouse Disney (2000–2011); Disney Junior (2011–2020)

Disney Jr. (previously known as Playhouse Disney and Disney Junior) is a British and Irish preschool pay television channel owned by The Walt Disney Company Limited, primarily broadcasting preschool programming. The channel launched as Playhouse Disney on 29 September 2000 and rebranded as Disney Junior on 7 May 2011. It closed on 1 October 2020, following the launch and strategic refocus toward Disney+ in the region, before relaunching on Sky platforms on 13 November 2025.

== History ==
=== Early programming efforts ===
In 1997, Disney Channel launched a block titled "Disney Channel Underfives" dedicated to content for preschoolers.

The block was rebranded as Playhouse Disney in 2000, marking the first time the brand expanded outside the United States. The presenter-led links, fronted by Dave Benson Phillips and Alex Lovell (referred to as Big Dave and Little Alex), featured the two presenting links in "the Playhouse" during continuity.

=== Launch as a dedicated channel (2000–2005) ===
On 30 May 2000, it was announced by a Disney Television International representative that three new channels would launch on Sky Digital during that year: Disney Channel +1 (a timeshift channel), Toon Disney, and a standalone Playhouse Disney network. The three channels launched on 29 September 2000, as add-ons to the standard Disney Channel, being available as a single multiplex package or included with the Sky Movies pack. With the channel being exclusive to Sky at the time, the Playhouse Disney block continued to broadcast on Disney Channel during school-term weekdays.

Playhouse Disney was added to NTL alongside the other two multiplex networks on 7 December 2001, and eventually launched on Telewest on 3 December 2003. Following these launches, the Playhouse Disney block reduced its hours of featured programming and was eventually removed altogether in July 2004.

In April 2004, a nighttime block called "PJ's Bedtime" was added to the channel, to supplement the Playhouse presentation strand.

=== Transition to standard network (2006–2011) ===
On 28 February 2006, Disney Media Networks and BSkyB announced that Playhouse Disney, along with its sister channel Disney Channel, would transition from premium add-ons to basic television packages such as Sky's "Kids Mix" beginning on 16 March, and that a new sister channel, Disney Cinemagic, would launch under Disney's premium offerings, replacing Toon Disney. The transition of Playhouse Disney to a basic network led to a significant broadcast share increase of 83% by July. The Playhouse presentation format hosted by Big Dave and Little Alex remained until late August 2006, while the PJ's Bedtime block remained until late November 2007.

In June 2006, a Playhouse Disney block was added to the morning schedule of ABC1. It was removed after ABC1 shut down in September 2007. ABC1's slot on Sky would be used to launch a 25-minute timeshift of Playhouse Disney called Playhouse Disney+, which was added on 30 October and launched on 3 November.

=== Rebrand as Disney Junior (2011–2020) ===
On 29 January 2011, it was announced that Playhouse Disney would rebrand as Disney Junior on 7 May, as part of a worldwide rebranding. On the date of the rebrand, the channel transitioned to airing in a 16:9 widescreen ratio.

On 21 February 2013, Sky and Disney Channels Worldwide announced that a high-definition simulcast of Disney Junior would launch on Sky in May.

In September 2017, Disney XD +1 was temporarily rebranded as a pop-up channel titled Mickey and Pals, which aired various programming from Disney Junior.

=== Closure (2020) ===
Disney Junior, along with its sister channels Disney XD and Disney Channel, closed in the UK on 1 October 2020, after 20 years on air. The closure was announced on 25 June 2020 after the company's new carriage agreement with Sky and Virgin Media has failed, and all of the channels' content was transferred to Disney's streaming service, Disney+. Virgin Media removed the channels a day before their closure on 29 September, and was replaced by CBBC and CBeebies in the network's Sky EPG slots.

=== Relaunch (2025–present) ===
Disney Jr. UK started testing on the Astra 2F Satellite on 20 October 2025. A relaunch of the channel occurred on 13 November 2025, under the 2024 rebrand. This was part of Disney's strategy for linear and streaming television. When it relaunched, it was available exclusively on Sky UK, but unavailable on Sky's streaming service, Now. The channel became available on channel 204 on Sky Stream and 625 on Sky Q. In January 2026, the channel shifted slots from Sky channel 625 to 613.

== Logos ==
2000–2011

2019–2020

2025–present
