= Disney Channel (international) =

International expansion of Disney Channel

Logo for the EMEA variant of the channel since 1 August 2022.

This page details the international expansion of Disney Channel since launching on 18 April 1983. Its first local variants were launched on 1 September 1995 in the United Kingdom & Ireland and on 22 March 1997 in France.

== Localization ==
The international on-air channel brand's look is consistent with the Disney brand. Individual channel managers can develop schedules and marketing programs to allow children's preferences in the market. Additionally, local programming that meets Disney's standards, combined with difficulties, is acquired. If a program is thriving in a market, its format may be developed for other Disney channels' market viewing tastes. But Disney's channels in some markets were shut down due to Bob Chapek's controversial strategy of closing them down in favor of Disney+ between April 2020 and up until his ouster in December 2022, which was later reversed by Bob Iger after his return as Disney CEO, who confirmed that the linear TV channels will be able to coexist with Disney+ in synergy (excluding Brazil where Disney channels were shut down due to the high costs operationals associated with the SeAC and the pay TV crisis in that country).

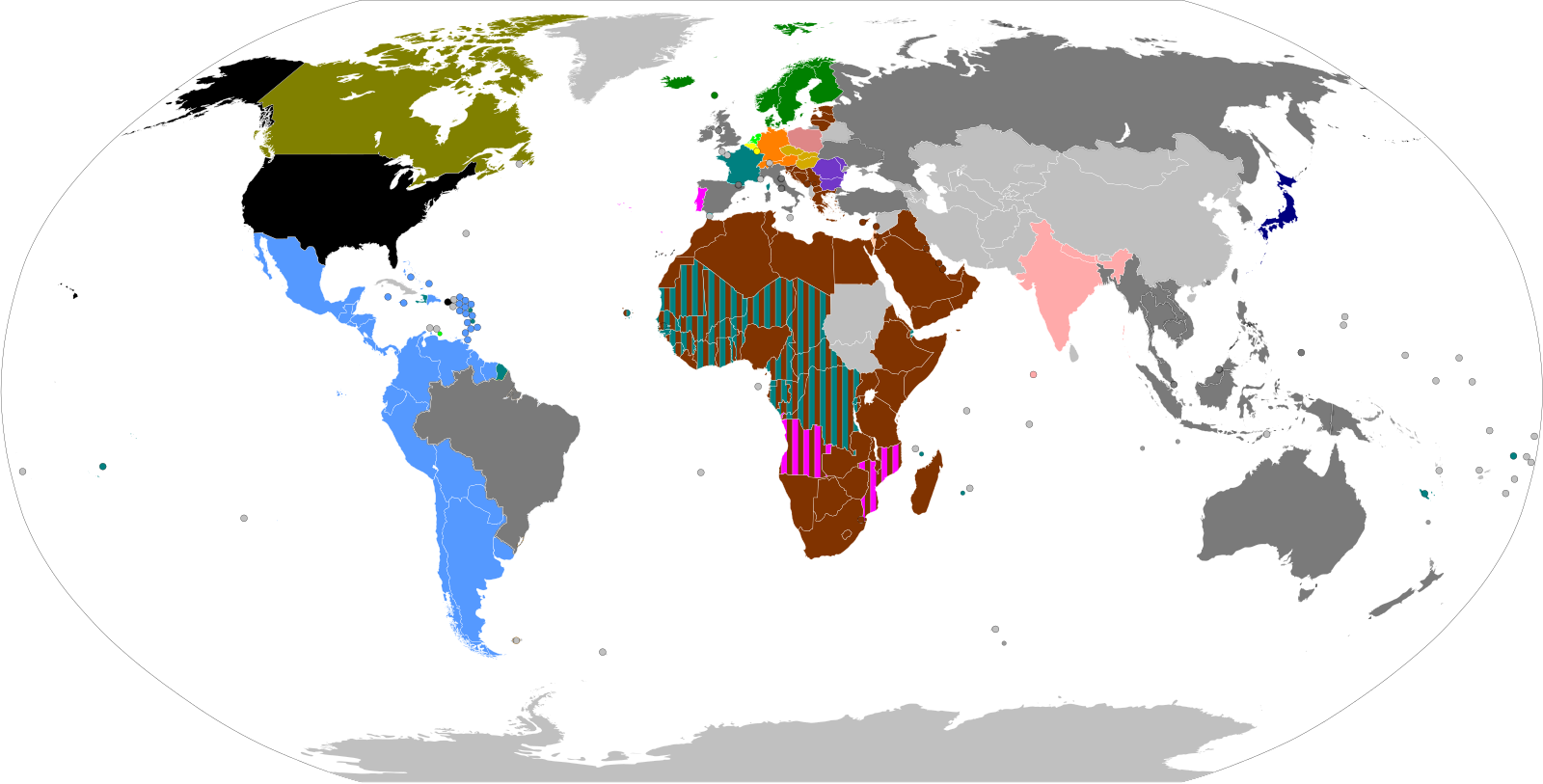
The Disney Channel in different version around the world, each represented by one colour. Gray indicates that their feeds were closed.

=== Asia ===
Disney Channel Asia officially launched on January 15, 2000, as a single video feed with an English audio track being the default and Mandarin audio and subtitle tracks also available. The channel became available in Malaysia, Singapore, Brunei and the Philippines. On June 1, 2002, the channel was launched in the South Korea market as a Korean-language feed. Over the first six months of 2005, Disney Channel Asia along with sister channel Playhouse Disney launched in Vietnam, Palau and Thailand and finishing off with a launch of both in Cambodia, its 11th market, with Cambodia Entertainment Production Co. Ltd. as distributor. Disney Channel Asia was also made available on select cable providers in Bangladesh after Disney Channel India was banned in the country in 2013. It ceased transmissions at the close of 2021.

==== Japan ====
In April 2009, the Walt Disney Company Ltd. Japan and Disney Channels Worldwide started Broadcast Satellite Disney Co., Ltd. to broadcast a women and family targeted channel, Dlife, with licensed received in October 2010 and debuted on March 17, 2012. In December 2013, Dlife launched a children's programming block called Disney Time. The channel was shut down on March 31, 2020, but was revived on March 1, 2024, as a replacement for the Japanese version of Fox.

==== China ====
Disney Channel does not have a localized version for China. However, many of its live-action and animated series are syndicated on regional channels through ABC owned Dragon Club since 1994. On July 31, 2015, Disney Channel's series began to be available on iQiyi and LeTV under the Disney hub, Following the closure of the hub after LeTV filed bankruptcy in 2020, Disney began to license Disney Channel's series along with series from Disney+ to Tencent Video on April 26, 2022.

Disney had a Chinese website to promote its series, however, it is now shut down and folded into Disney China's WeChat Official Account.

==== India ====
Previously, Disney programming was available through programming blocks starting as early as 1994 with Doordarshan then moving to Zee TV until the early 2000s. Disney moved its block to Sony Entertainment Television for three years. Star TV picked up the Disney TV blocks on Star Plus, Disney Time and on Star Utsav.

In December 2004, Walt Disney Television International India launched a Toon Disney channel with three language feeds (English, Tamil and Telugu) at the same time as the Disney Channel with Star TV network distributing the channels. Disney reached an agreement with Doordarshan (DD) in November 2005 for DD to carry a half-hour block called Disney Jadoo. Thus Disney was up to 4 branded blocks in India.

=== Canada ===
On April 16, 2015, Corus Entertainment announced that it had reached a multi-year agreement with Disney-ABC Television Group to acquire Canadian rights to Disney Channel's programming library and launched Disney Channel in Canada on 1 September 2015 — the first time that a Disney Channel-branded channel in operation in Canada.

Prior to this agreement, rights to Disney Channel programming were held by Family Channel, owned by WildBrain which was licensed as a premium service but was carried as a basic service by many television providers. Family was launched and formerly owned by Astral Media which was acquired by Bell Media in 2013, with Family divested to WildBrain (at the time known as DHX Media) a year later. Family Channel was commonly considered to be a de facto Canadian version of Disney Channel (though it was often mistakenly assumed to be related to the American Freeform channel (at the time known as ABC Family)) as a result of the fact that majority of Disney Channel US programming aired on Family, coupled with both channels developing similarly in their respective countries (as both began as premium services before adding basic subscription availability), a sister channel to Disney Channel US which was formerly known as The (emphasis added) Family Channel from 1988 to 1998; a Canadian version of ABC Family (now Freeform) launched on 26 March 2012, called ABC Spark to avoid confusion with Family Channel, to which it does not share common ownership). Some Canadian-produced original series produced by Family (such as Life with Derek, Naturally, Sadie and Overruled!) have aired on Disney Channel in the United States and globally in the past. In addition to its distribution agreement with Disney Channel U.S., Family also operated an English-language version of Disney Junior as a multiplex channel, as CRTC rules allow pay-TV channels licensed as premium services to add multiplex channels consistent with the network's license. Disney XD and a French-language version of Disney Junior were also owned by DHX Media, operating under separate licenses.

DHX's program supply agreement with Disney ended on January 1, 2016; as a result of these re-alignments, its Disney-branded networks were re-launched as spin-offs of the Family brand beforehand on September 18, 2015 (Family Jr. and Télémagino) and October 9, 2015 (Family Chrgd, later known as WildBrainTV).

== List of Disney Channels ==
=== Current channels ===
Market/Country	Type	Formerly	Launch date	Other countries	Operator
United States	Channel (East)	—N/a	April 18, 1983	—N/a	Disney Branded Television
United States	Channel (West)	—N/a	April 18, 1983	—N/a	Disney Branded Television
United States	Channel HD	—N/a	April 2, 2008	—N/a	Disney Branded Television
France	Channel	—N/a	March 22, 1997	—N/a	The Walt Disney Company France
France	Channel +1	—N/a	November 2, 2002	—N/a	The Walt Disney Company France
France	Channel HD	—N/a	September 20, 2011	—N/a	The Walt Disney Company France
Europe, Middle East, and Africa	Channel	—N/a	April 2, 1997 (English); April 1, 1998 (Arabic); September 25, 2006 (Africa); November 8, 2009 (Greece & Cyprus); 2009–2012 (Balkans); February 28, 2023 (Baltics); June 5, 2023 (Nordic countries)	Albania, Bosnia and Herzegovina, Croatia, Cyprus, Estonia, Greece, Latvia, Lithuania, Middle East, Montenegro, North Macedonia, Serbia, Slovenia, and most of Africa	The Walt Disney Company Limited
Europe, Middle East, and Africa	Channel HD	—N/a	2015	MENA	The Walt Disney Company Limited
Latin America	Channel (Mexico)	Disney Weekend	July 27, 2000	—N/a	Disney Media Networks Latin America
Latin America	Channel (Panregional)	Disney Weekend	July 27, 2000	Argentina, Bolivia, Caribbean, Central America, Chile, Colombia, Dominican Republic, Ecuador, Paraguay, Peru, Uruguay and Venezuela	Disney Media Networks Latin America
Latin America	Channel HD	—N/a	September 2012	—N/a	Disney Media Networks Latin America
Portugal	Channel	—N/a	November 28, 2001	Angola, Mozambique	The Walt Disney Company Portugal
Portugal	Channel HD	—N/a	May 4, 2021	—N/a	The Walt Disney Company Portugal
Japan	Channel	—N/a	November 18, 2003	—N/a	The Walt Disney Company (Japan) Ltd.
India	Channel	—N/a	December 17, 2004	Maldives, Nepal; previously Bangladesh, Bhutan, and Pakistan, but banned.	JioStar
India	Channel HD	—N/a	March 15, 2023	Maldives, Nepal; previously Bangladesh, Bhutan, and Pakistan, but banned.	JioStar
Poland	Channel	Disney Channel (EMEA)	December 2, 2006^{b}	—N/a	The Walt Disney Company Limited
Poland	Channel HD	—N/a	October 1, 2015	—N/a	The Walt Disney Company Limited
Israel	Channel	Jetix	September 9, 2009	—N/a	The Walt Disney Company (Israel) Ltd.
Czech Republic	Channel	Jetix	September 19, 2009	Slovakia	The Walt Disney Company Limited
Hungary	Channel	Jetix	September 19, 2009	—N/a	The Walt Disney Company Limited
Bulgaria	Channel	Jetix	September 19, 2009	—N/a	The Walt Disney Company Limited
Romania	Channel	Jetix	September 19, 2009	Moldova	The Walt Disney Company Limited
North Macedonia	Channel	Jetix	September 19, 2009	Gostivar	The Walt Disney Company Limited
Netherlands	Channel	—N/a	October 3, 2009	Belgium, now split	The Walt Disney Company (Benelux) BV
Belgium	Channel HD (Dutch)	Disney Channel (Netherlands)	2012	Flanders	The Walt Disney Company (Benelux) BV
Belgium	Channel HD (French)	Disney Channel (France)	June 29, 2015	Wallonia, Luxembourg	The Walt Disney Company (Benelux) BV
Canada	Channel (English)	Teletoon Retro	September 1, 2015	—N/a	Corus Entertainment
Scandinavia (relaunch)	Channel	Disney Channel EMEA	April 1, 2024	Denmark, Norway, Sweden, Finland, Iceland, Faroe Islands	The Walt Disney Company Nordic
Spain (relaunch)	Channel	Disney Jr. (Spain)	April 1, 2026	Andorra	The Walt Disney Company Spain

^aRelaunched via free-to-air replacing Das Vierte. Originally launched between October 16, 1999 to November 30, 2013 while the HD channel between December 24, 2011 to November 30, 2013 as well.

^bInitially became an independent feed on August 1, 2010.

=== Defunct channels ===
Market/Country	Type	Active date	Feeds/other countries	Operator	Fate
Ukraine	Channel	October 16, 2010–January 1, 2013	None	The Walt Disney Company Limited	Select programming moved to PLUSPLUS and NLO TV following the channel's closure.
Germany (original)	Channel	October 16, 1999–November 30, 2013	Austria, Switzerland	The Walt Disney Company (Germany)	The channel became free-to-air on January 17, 2014 but Disney XD, Disney Junior & Disney Cinemagic remained on pay-TV
Australia & New Zealand	Channel	December 24, 2003–November 30, 2019 (New Zealand); June 8, 1996–April 30, 2020 (Australia)	New Zealand	The Walt Disney Company Australia	Selected programming moved to Disney+ following the channel's closure.
Italy	Channel	October 3, 1998– May 1, 2020	San Marino; Vatican City	The Walt Disney Company Italy	Selected programming moved to Disney+ following the channel's closure.
Italy	Channel +1	December 24, 2004–May 1, 2020	San Marino; Vatican City	The Walt Disney Company Italy	Selected programming moved to Disney+ following the channel's closure.
Italy	Disney in English	December 20, 2008–October 1, 2019	San Marino; Vatican City	The Walt Disney Company Italy	Selected programming moved to Disney+ following the channel's closure.
Italy	Channel +2	October 1, 2011–April 9, 2018	San Marino; Vatican City	The Walt Disney Company Italy	Selected programming moved to Disney+ following the channel's closure.
Italy	Channel Mobile	October 1, 2011–May 1, 2020	San Marino; Vatican City	The Walt Disney Company Italy	Selected programming moved to Disney+ following the channel's closure.
Italy	HD Channel	February 1, 2012–May 1, 2020	San Marino; Vatican City	The Walt Disney Company Italy	Selected programming moved to Disney+ following the channel's closure.
Singapore	Channel	March 1, 2000–June 1, 2020	None	The Walt Disney Company Southeast Asia	Contract renewal failure with service providers in the country. It was replaced with Disney+.
United Kingdom	Channel	October 1, 1995–October 1, 2020	Ireland, Isle of Man, Channel Islands	The Walt Disney Company (UK) Ltd.	Sky and Virgin Media declined to sign a new deal to keep the Disney-branded networks running after the launch of Disney+ in the country. Selected programming moved to the service following the channel's closure.
United Kingdom	Channel +1	September 2000–October 1, 2020	Ireland, Isle of Man, Channel Islands	The Walt Disney Company (UK) Ltd.	Sky and Virgin Media declined to sign a new deal to keep the Disney-branded networks running after the launch of Disney+ in the country. Selected programming moved to the service following the channel's closure.
United Kingdom	Channel HD	2011–October 1, 2020	Ireland, Isle of Man, Channel Islands	The Walt Disney Company (UK) Ltd.	Sky and Virgin Media declined to sign a new deal to keep the Disney-branded networks running after the launch of Disney+ in the country. Selected programming moved to the service following the channel's closure.
Southeast Asia and Hong Kong	Channel	January 15, 2000–January 1, 2021	Malaysia, and Brunei	The Walt Disney Company Southeast Asia	Selected programming moved to Disney+ following the channel's closure.
Southeast Asia and Hong Kong	Channel	January 15, 2000–October 1, 2021 (Philippines); January 15, 2000–January 1, 2021 (Malaysia); July 2002–October 1, 2021 (Indonesia); April 2, 2004–October 1, 2021; 2005–October 1, 2021 (Thailand, Palau, Vietnam & Cambodia); December 2006–October 1, 2021 (Papua New Guinea); 2016–October 1, 2021 (Bangladesh)	Philippines; Indonesia; Thailand; Palau; Vietnam; Cambodia; Papua New Guinea; Bangladesh	The Walt Disney Company Southeast Asia	Selected programming moved to Disney+ following the channel's closure.
South Korea	Channel HD	July 1, 2011–October 1, 2021	None	Television Media Korea (SK Telecom 51% and Disney Channels International 49% venture), The Walt Disney Company (Korea) LLC	Selected programming moved to Disney+ following the channel's closure.
Taiwan	Channel HD	March 29, 1995–January 1, 2022	None	The Walt Disney Company (Taiwan) Ltd.	Selected programming moved to Disney+ following the channel's closure.
Turkey	Channel	April 29, 2007^{c}–March 31, 2022	None	Disney Televizyon Yayıncılık A.Ş. (Disney Co. Turkey)	Selected programming moved to Disney+ following the channel's closure.
Russia	Channel	August 10, 2010^{d}–December 14, 2022	None	Media-1 (80%); The Walt Disney Company CIS (20%)	Dissolution of the joint-venture with Media1 due to the Russian invasion of Ukraine. Replaced by Solntse.
Scandinavia (original)	Channel	February 28, 2003–June 5, 2023	Estonia; Latvia; Lithuania; Norway; Sweden; Finland; Denmark; Iceland	The Walt Disney Company Limited	Merged with the pan-EMEA feed.
Spain (original)	Channel +1	November 16, 2001–March 9, 2017	None	The Walt Disney Company Spain^{e}	Replaced in most operators with Disney Channel HD. Fully discontinued in favor of rewind features built into cable boxes.
Spain (original)	Channel	April 17, 1998 (July 1, 2008 on DTT)–January 7, 2025	Andorra	The Walt Disney Company Spain^{e}	Disney Iberia did not renew its agreement with Net TV to continue operating the channel on Spanish DTT.
Brazil	Channel	April 5, 2001–March 1, 2025	None	The Walt Disney Company Brazil	Closed due to high operational costs in the respective country, the dwindling pay TV ratings in Brazil and the Brazilian pay TV crisis.
Brazil	Channel HD	September 2012–March 1, 2025	None	The Walt Disney Company Brazil	Closed due to high operational costs in the respective country, the dwindling pay TV ratings in Brazil and the Brazilian pay TV crisis.
Canada	Channel (French)	September 1, 2015–September 1, 2025	None	Corus Entertainment	Closed as a cost-cutting measure due to financial pressure at Corus Entertainment.
Germany (current)	Channel	January 17, 2014–December 1, 2026	Austria: Switzerland	The Walt Disney Company Germany	The existing Disney Channel was rebranded as Disney TV, which shows programming from Disney+ and Hulu. Selected programming moved to Disney TV.

- ^cInitially went free-to-air on January 12, 2012
- ^dReplacing Jetix; later went free-to-air on December 31, 2011, replacing Seven TV.
- ^eSociedad Gestora de Televisión Net TV is owned by Vocento SA, The Walt Disney Company Iberia S.L. (20%) and Intereconomía Corporation SA. Which in addition to the Disney channels owns Intereconomia TV, a generalist channel.

== See also ==
- Disney Jr. (international)
- Disney XD (international)
