= MundoFox (disambiguation) =

MundoFox or Mundo Fox may refer to:

- mundofox.com, the former URL used by Fox Channel in Latin America
- Star+, an over-the-top video streaming service in Latin America formerly known as Mundo Fox and Fox Play
- MundoMax, a defunct Spanish language terrestrial television network in the United States known as MundoFox until 2015
- Nat Geo Kids (Latin American TV channel), a Latin American Spanish language television channel previously known as MundoFox from 2013 until 2017
- Mundo Fox (African TV channel), a sister station of Fox Portugal available in Portuguese-speaking African countries
