= Star Movies (Portuguese TV channel) =

- Country: Portugal; Angola; Mozambique
- Headquarters: Lisbon

Programming
- Language: Portuguese
- Picture format: 1080i HDTV (downscaled to 16:9 576i for the SDTV feed)

Ownership
- Owner: The Walt Disney Company Portugal
- Parent: The Walt Disney Company Iberia S.L.
- Sister channels: Star Channel; Star Life; Star Comedy; Star Crime; 24Kitchen; National Geographic; Nat Geo Wild; BabyTV

History
- Launched: 7 February 2024
- Replaced: Fox Next
- Former names: Fox Movies (2011-2024)

Links
- Website: startv.pt (in Portuguese)

Star Movies is a Portuguese pay television movie channel owned by The Walt Disney Company Portugal. It was launched on 1 July 2011.

== History ==
=== As Fox Movies ===
Fox Movies started broadcasting on July 1, 2011 as the "natural successor" to Fox Next. Already from the start, the channel had an HD feed, at the time of launching, 80% of the movies in its back catalog were already HD-ready.

The channel airs the most recent and successful movies in many genres including drama, comedy, science fiction, action and horror. Programming during the summer slate of 2011 included hits such as X-Men and The Queen. Within months of its launch, the channel had planned the start of themed seasons.

Following Disney's acquisition of the Fox Networks Group in 2019, the channel began to promote certain events around releases on Disney+ or theatrical releases from Disney. Such examples include airings from Predator and Predator 2 to promote the release of Prey on Disney+, and airings of the Indiana Jones films to promote the release of Indiana Jones and the Dial of Destiny in theaters.

=== As Star Movies ===
On November 27, 2023, Disney has announced that Fox Movies was going to rebrand to Star Movies on 7 February 2024.
