= Disney Kids & Family =

Television production unit of Disney for children, teenagers and families

- Formerly: List: Walt Disney Entertainment, Inc. (1982–83); The Disney Channel, Inc. (1983–97); Disney Channel, Inc. (1997–2001); ABC Cable Networks Group (2001–05); Disney Channels Worldwide (2005–2020); Disney Branded Television (2020–2026)
- Type: Division
- Industry: Entertainment; Television
- Genre: Children and family
- Founded: July 15, 1982; 44 years ago
- Founder: Alan Wagner
- Headquarters: Walt Disney Studios, Burbank, California, U.S.
- Number of locations: 37 (formerly)
- Area served: Worldwide
- Key people: Ayo Davis (president)
- Brands: Disney Jr.; Disney Channel; Disney XD
- Services: Television content
- Parent: Walt Disney Telecommunications (1982–1996); Disney Entertainment Television (1996–present)
- Subsidiaries: Disney Original Documentary; Disney Television Animation
- Website: detpress.com/disneykidsandfamily

Disney Kids & Family is a unit of Disney Entertainment Television which oversees development, production and acquisition of content geared towards children, teenagers and families for Disney+, Disney Jr., Disney Channel and Disney XD. Disney-branded unscripted series, documentaries and specials for Disney+ and Disney channels are also produced by this unit.

As Disney Channels Worldwide, the unit oversaw all local and global Disney television networks and channels until a conglomerate restructuring on March 14, 2018 brought forth Walt Disney Direct-to-Consumer & International, which then took over the supervision of the global variations of the Disney channels and other non-US channels like Disney International HD, Dlife and Hungama TV. The supervision of the local channels and Radio Disney remained with Disney Channels Worldwide until October 1, 2020, when the division was relaunced as Disney Branded Television to reflect the growth of the then-newly-launched Disney+ and the gradual shift away from focusing on linear television at the time.

Disney Channel was originally established in the United States on April 18, 1983 as a premium channel, but converted to a basic service in 1997 where it remained ever since. Since March 1995, Disney Channel expanded globally with the launch of various country-specific and regional variants of the channel, as well as program licensing agreements reached with television networks and channels not bearing the Disney Channel brand or name.

Previous corporate names for this division were: Walt Disney Entertainment, Inc. (1982–83), The Disney Channel, Inc. (1983–1997), Disney Channel, Inc. (1997–2001), ABC Cable Networks Group (2001–05), Disney Channels Worldwide (2005–2020) and Disney Branded Television (2020–2026).

== History ==
=== Walt Disney Entertainment, Inc. ===
On November 10, 1981, Walt Disney Productions and Westinghouse Broadcasting announced that they had joined up to start a family-oriented cable television service. In 1982, Disney hired Alan Wagner to develop a cable channel.

The channel moved into the home satellite dish market thus scrambling its signal in 1984. By July 15, 1982, Disney incorporated Walt Disney Entertainment, Inc., which was renamed by January 28, 1983, to The Disney Channel, Inc.

=== The Disney Channel, Inc. ===
The Disney Channel was launched on April 18, 1983 as a premium channel with 16 hours of programming. The channel became profitable in January 1985. The channel began moving to basic cable level on September 1, 1990, with TCI Montgomery Cablevision. In March 1995, the first international Disney Channel began broadcasting in Taiwan while the third was launched in October 1995 for the United Kingdom.

=== Disney Channel, Inc. ===
By September 29, 1997, the corporate name was shortened to just Disney Channel, Inc. Disney had hired Geraldine Laybourne away from rival channel Nickelodeon in 1996. She founded a kids channel codename ABZ, which the media speculated to be aimed at preschoolers, but was dismissed by Laybourne. In December 1997, the Toon Disney channel was announced as a basic channel consisting of Disney animated programming. By April 1, 1998, most of the international versions are pay channels while the Taiwan and Malaysia feeds are ad supported and the American version is a basic channel. Toon Disney Channel was launched on April 18, 1998, on Disney Channel's 15th anniversary.

On April 6, 1997, Disney Channel was converted to basic cable and launched the Playhouse Disney brand in the form of a programming block. The Playhouse Disney brand was expanded to a television channel overseas, launching in the United Kingdom on 29 September 2000. Towards late June 2001, Disney was looking into launch Playhouse Disney as a channel in the United States for 2002, which never materialized.

=== ABC Cable Networks Group ===
Disney Channel, Inc. changed its name to ABC Cable Networks Group, Inc. by January 31, 2001. Then-newly-renamed ABC Family Worldwide was shifted from Disney COO Bob Iger's directly reporting unit to the ABC Cable Networks Group under Anne Sweeney on October 20, 2003. In early 2004, Disney Channel's original programming leaders took over ABC Family's original movies unit temporarily as two ABC Family executives left the channel.

In January 2004, Fox Kids Europe, Fox Kids Latin America and ABC Cable Networks Group created the Jetix programming alliance that would rebrand Fox Kids in Europe, Middle East and Latin America as Jetix. ABC1 launched on UK's digital terrestrial television platform Freeview (UK) on September 27, 2004.

=== Disney Channels Worldwide ===
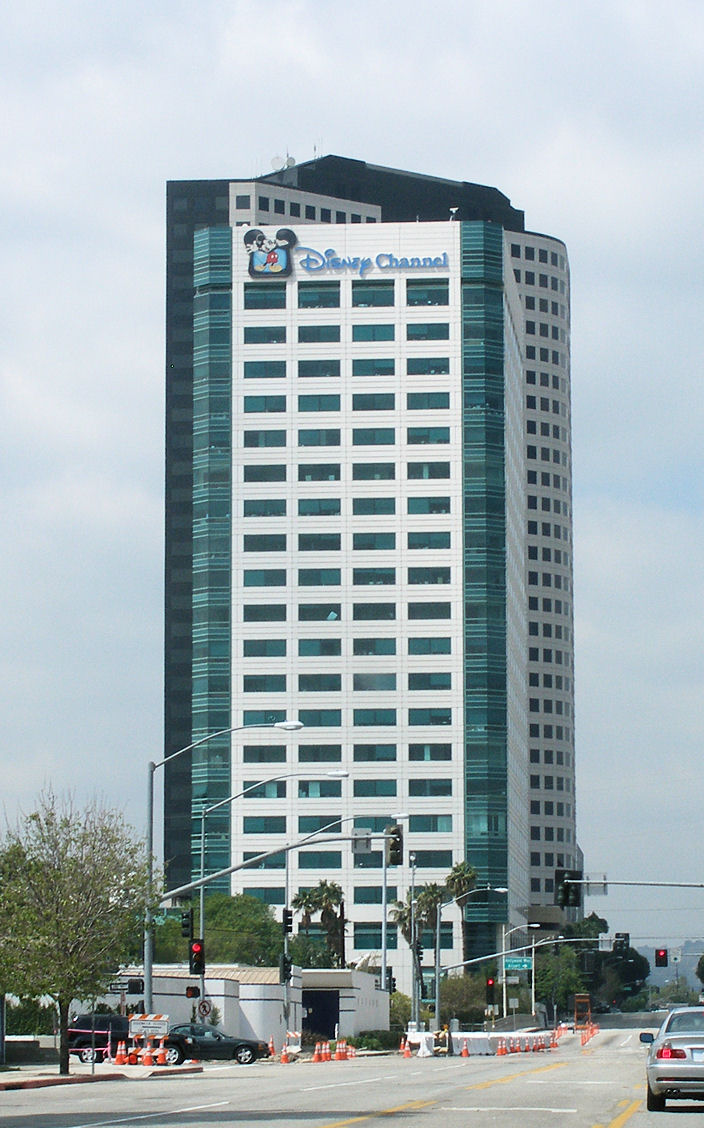
Disney Channels Worldwide's headquarters in Burbank, California as it appeared during the 2000s

Barry Blumberg resigned as president of Walt Disney Television Animation on November 17, 2005 to allow the planned transfer of TV animation to Disney Channels Worldwide. In 2006, Disney India acquired Hungama TV from UTV Software Communications Limited Disney Cinemagic began broadcasting in the UK on Sky on March 16, 2006 and expanded across Western Europe in timeshift and HD variants. ABC1 ceased broadcasting on all UK TV platforms at noon on September 26, 2007.

In Spain, The Walt Disney Company Iberia purchased 20% of Management Company Television Net TV SA (or NET TV) on February 12, 2008 and announced on May 28 that same year the move of Disney Channel to the digital over-the air space, replacing NET TV's Fly Music on July 1. The company's Japanese unit, Walt Disney Television International Japan, started procuring its own animated series in March 2008, with the first two series to debut at Tokyo International Anime Fair 2008. The company produced Stitch! with Madhouse, Inc., while Fireball was produced with Jinni's Animation Studios.

After two Disney Channel stars had various scandals, the company started a set of classes for their young stars in 2009 to adapt to the pressure of fame. Optional monthly life-skill classes were added in 2014.

Disney XD was launched on February 13, 2009, taking over the channel space of Toon Disney in the US and Jetix overseas (with some rebranding instead to Disney Channel) starting with France on April 1. That April, The Walt Disney Company Japan and Disney Channels Worldwide started Broadcast Satellite Disney Co., Ltd. to broadcast a women and family targeted channel called Dlife with licensed content, received in October 2010 and debuted on March 17, 2012. Jetix Play closed down on August 1, 2010, in most countries, in Turkey on September 1, 2010 and in Romania on March 12, 2011, after which they were all replaced with Playhouse Disney.

On May 26, 2010, Disney–ABC Television Group announced the launch of Disney Junior, which would replace the Playhouse Disney block on sister network Disney Channel in February 2011, and extend to a standalone preschooler-oriented channel that would replace Soapnet in January 2012. All 22 Playhouse Disney channels and blocks outside the U.S. were also renamed "Disney Junior" throughout 2011. On October 27, 2011, Disney reached a joint venture agreement (49%/51%) with UTH Russia, in which UTH will turn its broadcasting network Seven TV into Disney Channel starting in early 2012. On March 28, 2013, Cinemagic was replaced with Sky Movies Disney in the UK market under license from BSkyB.

In April 2013, Disney announced that acquired German free-to-air broadcast station Das Vierte would become the German free-to-air variant of Disney Channel on January 17, 2014. Disney formed an in-house ad sales company called Disney Media + for the channel, given that two competitors control most ad sales companies. Disney India shut down Bindass Play, a Hindi music channel, and replaced it with Disney International HD on October 29, 2017. This general entertainment channel is in English and HD, targeted to ages 14 to 25 while only tapping Disney live action shows.

=== Company divisions split ===
With Disney's March 14, 2018 reorganization in the midst of acquiring 21st Century Fox, all international channels and businesses were transferred to a new dedicated segment known as Walt Disney Direct-to-Consumer and International, while the local units remained with Disney–ABC Television Group. On January 20, 2019, Disney India shut down its local Disney XD variant and replaced it with Marvel HQ, featuring programming from Marvel Entertainment and other companies.

Disney+ launched on November 12, 2019 in the US and New Zealand, with the latter country's television channels getting shut down a few days later. Disney Channels Worldwide announced on June 26 that its main channels in the UK and Ireland would shut down on October 1, with their content moving over to Disney+, as the extension of a carriage deal with Sky and Virgin Media could not be reached.

=== Disney Branded Television ===
After a company restructuring in November 2020, Disney's local television channels became part of Disney Branded Television, a newly created unit of Disney General Entertainment Content (now Disney Entertainment Television). Headed by the former Disney Channels Worldwide president, Gary Marsh, the unit oversees development and production of content made for children, adolescents and families for Disney Channel, Disney Junior, Disney XD and Disney+. Disney Branded TV also oversees all Disney+ unscripted series and specials. On December 3, 2020, Disney announced that Radio Disney and Radio Disney Country would cease operations in early 2021. After the reorganization, the management of Disney XD was moved to Disney Media and Entertainment Distribution.

On December 9, 2021, Disney acquired the documentary short Sophie and the Baron and brought it under its newly created Disney Original Documentary banner. On March 1, 2022, Marvel HQ in India was rebranded to Super Hungama. On March 10, 2022, Disney announced a suspension of its operations in Russia in response to the Russian invasion of Ukraine. Its Russian channel, however, continued operating until the dissolution of Disney's joint venture with local broadcaster Media-1 on December 14, 2022. On March 15, 2023, Disney Channel HD was launched in India.

=== Disney Kids & Family ===
On March 15, 2026, Dana Walden became the Disney's first Chief Creative Officer and announced that Debra OConnell would replace her as chairman of Disney Entertainment Television unit with oversight of Disney Branded Television unit and Ayo Davis now reporting to OConnell instead of Craig Erwich. On June 15, 2026, OConnell did a review of the Disney Branded Television unit and announced its renaming to Disney Kids & Family; the new name is designed to more accurately reflect the nature of the division’s content and the audience it targets across Disney+, Disney Jr., Disney Channel, and digital platforms as the "Branded Television" part caused some confusion with company members and audiences.

On August 28 2026, the unit inked a global distribution deal with The Pokémon Company for the broadcast and distribution of the Pokémon library on Disney XD and Disney+ as well the stop-motion series Pokémon Tales: The Misadventures of Sirfetch'd & Pichu which originally was set to debut on Netflix.

On September 17, 2026, the unit inked a overall development deal with kids brand Like Nastya for the development and creation of original content for preschoolers, kids, tweens, teens and families.

== Filmography ==
=== Television series ===
Title	Genre	Year(s)	Network	Co-production company(s)	Notes
Out of the Box	Preschool	1998–2004	Playhouse Disney	OOTB Inc.	
Even Stevens	Sitcom	2000–2003	Disney Channel; ABC	Brookwell McNamara Entertainment	
Lizzie McGuire	Sitcom	2001–2004	Disney Channel; ABC	Stan Rogow Productions; Egmont Imagination (seasons 1–2); Telescreen (season 2)	
The Book of Pooh	Preschool	2001–2003	Playhouse Disney	Shadow Projects	Based on the books by A.A. Milne
Stanley	Preschool	2001–2004	Playhouse Disney	Cartoon Pizza	
JoJo's Circus	Preschool	2003–2007	Playhouse Disney	Cartoon Pizza; Cuppa Coffee Studios	
Phil of the Future	Sitcom	2004–2006	Disney Channel; ABC	2121 Productions	
Higglytown Heroes	Preschool	2004–2008	Playhouse Disney	Wildbrain Entertainment; Happy Nest	
Little Einsteins	Preschool	2005–2009	Playhouse Disney	Curious Pictures; The Baby Einstein Company	
Handy Manny	Preschool	2006–2013	Playhouse Disney (2006–2011); Disney Jr. (2011–2013)	Nelvana Limited	
Bunnytown	Preschool	2007–2008	Playhouse Disney	Spiffy Pictures; Baker/Coogan Productions	
Can You Teach My Alligator Manners?	Short series	2008–2009	Playhouse Disney	Oddbot Animation	
Imagination Movers	Preschool	2008–2013	Playhouse Disney (2008–2011); Disney Jr. (2011–2013)	Penn/Bright Entertainment; Zydeco Productions	
Jungle Junction	Preschool	2009–2012	Playhouse Disney (2009–2011); Disney Jr. (2011–2012)	Spider Eye Productions	
PrankStars	Reality	2011	Disney Channel; Disney XD	Zoo Productions	
Henry Hugglemonster	Preschool musical	2013–2015	Disney Jr.	Brown Bag Films	Previously titled The Happy Hugglemonsters.
Sheriff Callie's Wild West	Preschool	2014–2017	Disney Jr.	DHX Media Los Angeles (season 1); Wild Canary Animation (season 2)	Originally titled Oki's Oasis
Kirby Buckets	Comedy	2014–2017	Disney XD	Horizon Productions	
Stuck in the Middle	Sitcom	2016–2018	Disney Channel	International Donut Fund Productions; Horizon Productions	
Walk the Prank	Comedy	2016–2018	Disney XD	Blackbird Films; Sullen Child; Horizon Productions	
Puppy Dog Pals	Preschool	2017–2023	Disney Jr.	Wild Canary Animation	Originally titled Puppy Dog Tails
Vampirina	Preschool	2017–2021	Disney Jr.	Brown Bag Films	
101 Dalmatian Street	Animated sitcom	2019–2020	Disney Channel UK	Passion Animation Studios	Disney Europe, Middle East & Africa Original Animation Team
High School Musical: The Musical: The Series	Musical; Mockumentary	2019–2023	Disney+	Chorus Boy; Salty Pictures	
Becoming	Documentary series	2020	Disney+	SpringHill Entertainment; ITV America; Spoke Studios	Originally produced for Disney XD
Secrets of Sulphur Springs	Mystery	2021–2023	Disney Channel	Gwave Productions	
The Chicken Squad	Preschool	2021–2022	Disney Jr.	Wild Canary Animation	
Behind the Attraction	Documentary series	2021–present	Disney+	Seven Bucks Productions; The Nucelle Company	
Chip 'n' Dale: Park Life	Animated comedy	2021–2024	Disney+	Xilam Animation	Disney Europe, Middle East & Africa Original Animation Team
Spidey and His Amazing Friends	Preschool	2021–present	Disney Jr.	Marvel Animation; Atomic Cartoons	
Among the Stars	Documentary series	2021	Disney+	Olive Bridge Entertainment; Fulwell 73 Productions	
Foodtastic	Cooking series	2021	Disney+	Endemol Shine North America	
Eureka!	Preschool	2022–2023	Disney Jr.	Brown Bag Films	
SuperKitties	Preschool	2023–present	Disney Jr.	Sony Pictures Television Kids	
Kizazi Moto: Generation Fire	Animated anthology	2023	Disney+	Triggerfish Animation Studios	Disney Europe, Middle East & Africa Original Animation Team
Saturdays	Sitcom	2023	Disney Channel	Over the Hump Production Inc. Genius Entertainment; GWave Productions	
Star Wars: Young Jedi Adventures	Preschool	2023–2025	Disney+ Disney Jr.	LucasFilm Animation; Wild Canary Animation; ICON Creative Studio	
Pupstruction	Preschool	2023–present	Disney Jr.	Titmouse, Inc.	
The Muppets Mayhem	Sitcom	2023	Disney+	The Muppets Studio; Adam F. Goldberg Productions; ABC Signature	
Pretty Freekin Scary	Sitcom	2023	Disney Channel	Cloudco Entertainment; CakeStart Entertainment; Kickstart Entertainment; Apt. 11H Productions	
Percy Jackson and the Olympians	Fantasy	2023–present	Disney+ Hulu	Co-Lab 21; The Gotham Group; Mythomagic; Quaker Moving Pictures; 20th Television	
Ariel	Preschool	2024–present	Disney Jr.	Wild Canary Animation	
Kindergarten: The Musical	Preschool	2024–2025	Disney Jr.	Oddbot Animation	
RoboGobo	Preschool	2025–present	Disney Jr.	Brown Bag Films	
Electric Bloom	Musical sitcom	2025	Disney Channel	Echo & Cici Productions; Fox & Lewis; Diane Warren + Bahareh Batmang; Kenwood TV Productions	
Iron Man and His Awesome Friends	Preschool	2025–2026	Disney Jr.	Marvel Animation; Atomic Cartoons	Spin-off of Spidey and His Amazing Friends
Vampirina: Teenage Vampire	Musical sitcom	2025–present	Disney Channel	Cross Hoge Productions; Chorus Boy; Kenwood TV Productions	
Hey A.J.!	Preschool	2026–present	Disney Jr.	Surfing Giant Studios	
Magicampers	Preschool	2026–present	Disney Jr.	OuiDo! Productions	Disney Europe, Middle East & Africa Original Animation Team
Dragon Striker	Animated fantasy	2026–present	Disney Channel; Disney XD; Disney+	La Chouette Compagnie; Disney Television Animation	Disney Europe, Middle East & Africa Original Animation Team
Malcolm in the Middle: Life's Still Unfair	Sitcom	2026	Hulu	20th Television; New Regency; Disney Television Studios	Sequel to Malcolm in the Middle; Mini-series
The Doomies	Animated horror comedy	2026–present	Disney+	Xilam Animation; Disney Television Animation	
Megan and Cupcake	Preschool	2026–present	Disney Jr.	Riverstreet Productions	
Coven Academy	Fantasy dramedy	2026–present	Freeform	Chorus Boy Productions; Slavkin/Swimmer Productions; BearClaw Productions Inc.	Originally intended to air on Disney Channel before being moved to Freeform.
Avengers: Mightiest Friends	Preschool	2027	Disney Jr.	Marvel Animation; Atomic Cartoons	Spin-off of Spidey and His Amazing Friends and Iron Man and His Awesome Friends
Sam Witch	Preschool	2027	Disney Jr.	Brown Bag Films	
The Sunnyridge 3	Animated comedy	2027	Disney+	Blink Industries; Boat Rock Media; Disney Television Animation	Disney Europe, Middle East & Africa Original Animation Team
Afterlife with Archie	Horror	2027	Disney+	Warner Bros. Television Studios	Based on the comic series of the same name
Eragon	Fantasy	TBA	Disney+	20th Television; Co-Lab 21	

=== Television specials ===
Title	Genre	Release date	Network	Co-production company(s)
Muppets Haunted Mansion	Comedy	October 8, 2021	Disney+	The Muppets Studio and Soapbox Films
Mickey and Friends Trick or Treats	Preschool	October 1, 2023	Disney Jr.	Stoopid Buddy Stoodios
Mickey and the Very Many Christmases	Preschool	December 1, 2024	Disney Jr.	Wild Canary Animation
Spidey and Iron Man: Avengers Team-Up!	Preschool	October 16, 2025	Disney Jr.	Marvel Animation and Atomic Cartoons
The Muppet Show	Variety show	February 4, 2026	Disney+ ABC	Point Grey Pictures, The Muppet Studio, and 20th Television
Spidey and the Avengers: Halloween Team-Up!	Preschool	September 24, 2026	Disney Jr.	Marvel Animation and Atomic Cartoons
Mickey's Home Alone	Preschool	November 26, 2026	Disney Jr.	Wild Canary Animation and ICON Creative Studio
Dasher	Preschool	November 28, 2026	Disney Jr.	Brown Bag Films,Trustbridge Entertainment and 9 Story Media Group

=== Television films and concert films ===
Title	Genre	Release date	Network	Co-production company(s)
Encanto at the Hollywood Bowl	Concert film	December 28, 2022	Disney+	Disney Concerts, AMP International, and Fulwell 73
Descendants: The Rise of Red	Fantasy musical	July 12, 2024 (Disney+); August 9, 2024 (Disney Channel)	Disney+ Disney Channel	Suzanne Todd Productions, Potato Monkey Productions, and GWave Productions
Out of My Mind	Coming-of-age	November 22, 2024	Disney+	Big Beach, Participant, Reunion Pacific Entertainment, and EveryWhere Studios
ZOMBIES 4: Dawn Of The Vampires	Fantasy musical	July 10, 2025	Disney Channel	Bloor Street Productions, Court Five, and Night Zone Productions
A Very Jonas Christmas Movie	Christmas comedy	November 14, 2025	Disney+ Hulu	20th Television
Descendants/ZOMBIES Worlds Collide: Concert Special	Concert film	February 19, 2026	Disney Channel; Disney+	Disney Concerts and AEG Presents
Descendants: Wicked Wonderland	Fantasy musical	July 16, 2026	Disney Channel	Suzanne Todd Productions, Potato Monkey Productions, and GWave Productions
Camp Rock 3	Coming-of-age musical	August 13 2026	Disney Channel	Jonas Group Entertainment, Chorus Boy Productions, Potato Monkey Productions, and DLG
The Cheetah Girls: Next Gen	Coming-of-age musical	2027	Disney Channel; Disney+	
Hidden Heroes: A Descendants Story	Fantasy musical	2027	Disney Channel; Disney+	
Zombies 5: Secrets of the Sea	Fantasy musical	2027	Disney Channel; Disney+	Bloor Street Productions, Court Five, and Night Zone Productions
Halloweentown 5	Supernatural coming-of-age comedy	TBA	Disney Channel; Disney+	

=== Documentaries ===
Title	Genre	Release date	Network	Co-production company(s)	Notes
Mija	Coming-of-age documentary	January 21, 2022	Disney+	Tertulia Pictures	
Mickey: The Story of a Mouse	Animation documentary	November 18, 2022	Disney+	Tremolo Productions	
If These Walls Could Sing	Music documentary	December 16, 2022	Disney+	Mercury Studios	
Bono & The Edge: A Sort of Homecoming	Music documentary	March 17, 2023	Disney+	Imagine Documentaries, Tremolo Productions, and Worldwide Pants	
Madu	Coming-of-age ballet documentary	March 29, 2024	Disney+	Hunting Lane Films	Winner of Outstanding Arts and Culture Documentary at the 46th News and Documentary Emmy Awards
Jim Henson Idea Man	Biographical documentary	May 31, 2024	Disney+	Imagine Documentaries, Fifth Season and Diamond Docs	Winner of five awards at the 77th Primetime Emmy Awards including Outstanding Documentary or Nonfiction Special
Elton John: Never Too Late	Music documentary	November 15, 2024	Disney+	Rocket Pictures and This Machine Filmworks	Nominated for Best Original Song at the 97th Academy Awards and Winner for Best Original Song in a Documentary at the Hollywood Music in Media Awards
Hannah Montana 20th Anniversary Special	Music documentary	March 24, 2026	Disney+	Hopetown Entertainment and Unwell Productions	

=== Short films ===
Title	Genre	Release date	Network	Co-production company(s)	Notes
Le Pupille	Comedy-drama	December 16, 2022	Disney+	Tempesta and Esperanto Filmoj	Nominated for Best Live Action Short Film at the 95th Academy Awards
The Shepherd	Drama	December 1, 2023	Disney+	BKStudios, Esperanto Filmoj and Argo Films	
Nǎi Nai & Wài Pó	Documentary	February 9, 2024	Disney+ Hulu	Even/Odd and Junk Drawer	Nominated for Best Documentary Short Film at the 96th Academy Awards
An Almost Christmas Story	Stop-Motion	November 15, 2024	Disney+	Esperanto Filmoj, Titmouse, Inc., Maere Studios and 88 Pictures	Awarded for "Special Jury Prize" in the 2025 edition of the Annecy International Animation Film Festival

== Channel types per market ==
Market/Country		Disney Channel	Disney Jr.	Disney XD	Cinemagic Disney Movies	Other
United States		April 18, 1983; West, East HD, West HD	February 14, 2011 (block); March 23, 2012	February 13, 2009	None	Radio Disney (1996–2021); Radio Disney Country (2015–2021)
~~Taiwan~~		March 29, 1995 –January 1, 2022	2012 –December 31, 2021 (block)	None	None	None
United Kingdom		October 1, 1995 –September 30, 2020 +1, HD	May 7, 2011 –September 30, 2020 (original); November 13, 2025 (relaunch) +1, HD	August 31, 2009 –May 1, 2020 +1 –September 30, 2020 +1, HD	March 16, 2006 –March 28, 2013 (as Disney Cinemagic); March 28, 2013 –December 31, 2020 (as Sky Movies Disney); March 17, 2026 (as Disney+ Cinema)[1]	ABC1 (2004–2007)
~~Australia~~		June 8, 1996 –April 30, 2020	May 29, 2011 –April 30, 2020	April 10, 2014 –January 6, 2019	April 10, 2014 –November 7, 2019 (as Foxtel Movies Disney)	None
France		March 22, 1997 +1, HD	May 28, 2011 –January 1, 2025 (France); 2011 (Wallonia and overseas territories) HD	April 1, 2009 –April 7, 2020; HD	November 4, 2007 –May 8, 2015 (as Disney Cinemagic); May 8, 2015 –April 7, 2020 (as Disney Cinema)	Disneynature TV (2012–2018)
Middle East & North Africa		April 2, 1997; HD	June 1, 2011 (English); May 31, 2016 (Arabic); HD	2009 –December 31, 2020; HD	2018–2021 (as OSN Movies Disney HD)	None
Spain		April 17, 1998^{a} –January 7, 2025 (original); April 1, 2026 (relaunch)	June 11, 2011 –April 1, 2026	September 18, 2009 –April 1, 2020; HD	July 1, 2008 –January 1, 2015	Intereconomía TV (2005)
Italy		October 3, 1998 –April 9, 2018 +2 –October 1, 2019; Disney in English May 1, 2020 +1, HD, Mobile	May 14, 2011 –May 1, 2020 (original); December 1, 2025 (relaunch) +1	September 28, 2009 –April 9, 2018 +2 –October 1, 2019 +1, +2, HD	None	None
Germany		October 16, 1999^{b} HD; December 1, 2026	July 14, 2011 –September 30, 2021	October 18, 2009 –April 1, 2020 +1	July 4, 2009 –October 1, 2019; HD	Disney TV (2026)
~~Malaysia~~		January 15, 2000 –December 31, 2020; HD	July 11, 2011 –December 31, 2020; HD	September 15, 2012 –December 31, 2020; HD	None	None
~~Philippines~~		January 15, 2000 –September 30, 2021; HD	July 11, 2011 –September 30, 2021	May 31, 2014 –December 31, 2020	None	None
~~Singapore~~		March 1, 2000 –May 31, 2020; HD	July 11, 2011 –May 31, 2020	March 16, 2013 –May 31, 2020	None	None
Latin America (Spanish)		July 27, 2000	April 1, 2011	July 3, 2009 –April 1, 2022	None	Radio Disney
~~Brazil~~		April 5, 2001 –March 1, 2025; HD	April 1, 2011 –April 1, 2022	July 3, 2009 –April 1, 2022	None	Radio Disney
Portugal		November 28, 2001	November 1, 2012	None	October 1, 2008 –November 1, 2012	None
~~Indonesia~~		July 2002 –October 1, 2021	July 11, 2011 –October 1, 2021	October 19, 2013 –December 31, 2020	None	None
Scandinavia		February 28, 2003 –June 5, 2023 (original); April 1, 2024 (relaunch); HD	September 10, 2011 –March 1, 2024 (Denmark) –April 1, 2024	September 12, 2009 –December 31, 2020	None	None
Belgium		March 31, 2003	2011	None	None	None
Japan		November 2003	Fall 2012	August 2009 –January 31, 2021	None	Dlife (2012–2020; revived in 2024)
~~Hong Kong~~		April 2, 2004 –October 1, 2021	April 2, 2004 –October 1, 2021	None	None	None
India		December 17, 2004	October 15, 2012	November 14, 2009 –January 9, 2019	None	Disney International HD; Super Hungama; Hungama TV; Bindass; UTV Action; UTV Movies
~~Thailand~~		January 2005 –October 1, 2021	July 11, 2011 –October 1, 2021	October 19, 2013 –December 31, 2020	None	None
~~Vietnam~~		May 2005 –October 1, 2021	July 11, 2011 –October 1, 2021	None	None	None
South Africa		September 25, 2006	June 1, 2011	May 11, 2011 –October 1, 2020	None	None
Poland		December 2, 2006; HD	June 1, 2011	September 2009	None	None
Turkey		April 29, 2007^{d} –March 31, 2022	June 1, 2011; HD	October 3, 2009 –January 31, 2021	None	None
Israel		September 9, 2009	July 18, 2011	January 1, 2018 –February 1, 2018 (pop-up channel on HOT)	None	None
Bulgaria		September 19, 2009	June 1, 2011 –February 29, 2012 (block); March 1, 2012 (channel)	None	None	None
Czechia		September 19, 2009	June 1, 2011 –July 1, 2015 (block); June 1, 2011 (channel)	None	None	None
Hungary		September 19, 2009	June 1, 2011 –July 1, 2015 (block); July 1, 2015 –December 5, 2017 (channel)	None	None	None
Romania		September 19, 2009	June 1, 2011 –February 29, 2012 (block); March 1, 2012 (channel)	None	None	None
North Macedonia		September 19, 2009	April 15, 2011 –August 27, 2012 (block); September 26, 2012 (channel)	None	None	None
Slovakia		September 19, 2009	None	None	None	None
Netherlands		October 3, 2009	September 10, 2011 –April 1, 2019 (original); May 1, 2025 (relaunch)	January 1, 2010 –May 1, 2025	None	None
Greece		November 7, 2009	June 1, 2011	October 3, 2009 –January 31, 2021	None	None
~~Russia~~		August 10, 2010^{c} –December 14, 2022 +2, +4, +7	September 1, 2013 –December 13, 2022 (block)	None	None	Radio Disney (2013–2022)
~~South Korea~~		July 1, 2011 –October 1, 2021; HD	July 1, 2011 – October 1, 2021; HD	None	None	None
Serbia		2012	2012/2013	2009 –December 31, 2020	None	None
Slovenia		2012	2012/2013	2009 –December 31, 2020	None	None
Canada	DHX Media	None	May 6, 2011 – September 18, 2015 (both English and French)	June 1, 2011 –October 9, 2015	None	Radio Disney
Canada	Corus	September 1, 2015 (English); September 1, 2015 –September 1, 2025 (La Chaîne Disney)	December 1, 2015 –September 1, 2025 (English channel); November 30, 2015 –September 1, 2025 (French block)	December 1, 2015 –September 1, 2025 (English channel); June 27, 2016 –2019 (French block)	None	ABC Spark (2012–2025)
Notes: ^aInitially as a paid channel; went free-to-air on July 1, 2008; ^bInitially as a paid channel; went free-to-air on January 17, 2014; ^cInitially as a paid channel; went free-to-air on December 31, 2011, in a joint venture with UTH Russia.; ^dInitially as a paid channel; went free-to-air in January 2012.

== See also ==
- Disney Channel (international)
- Disney Jr. (international)
- Disney XD (international)
