= ABC1 (British and Irish TV channel) =

Former British and Irish television channel

Programming
- Picture format: 576i (4:3 SDTV)

Ownership
- Owner: Disney–ABC Television Group
- Sister channels: Disney Channel; Playhouse Disney; Disney Cinemagic; Jetix

History
- Launched: 27 September 2004; 22 years ago
- Closed: 26 September 2007; 19 years ago
- Replaced by: Playhouse Disney + (Sky)

Links
- Website: www.abc1tv.co.uk (archive)

Availability (at time of closure)

Terrestrial
- Freeview: Channel 15 (except Wales) (06:00–18:00)

ABC1 was a British television channel owned by the Disney-ABC Television Group division of The Walt Disney Company, available to the viewers in the United Kingdom and Ireland. ABC1 used the branding of the Disney-owned American network, ABC.

The channel aired general entertainment programming from the U.S. channel, except for the weekend morning programming block Playhouse Disney, which was aimed at preschoolers and also aired on Disney Channel, the American version of which the block originated from.

== History ==
ABC1 channel initially launched exclusively on the British digital terrestrial television platform Freeview on 27 September 2004, and was only broadcast daily from 6am to 6pm. The channel was not available on Freeview in Wales as the space on multiplex A was used by S4C. The channel was ad-free for the first few months to increase viewers. In December 2004, it was expanded on Telewest's digital cable service, and on 14 December on the NTL digital cable service.

In March 2005, ABC1 started airing advertising from Procter & Gamble. Unlike other channels in the UK and Ireland with advertisements generically every 15 minutes, ABC1's advertisement breaks were similar to channels in the U.S., with advertisements being run after a show's title sequence and before the end credits, with no further advertisement breaks during a show or between shows. Also in 2005, Sky started carrying the channel. In 2006, a Playhouse Disney block was added to the schedule in the morning.

On 7 September 2007, it was announced that ABC1 would close due to Disney's decision to focus on their other channels and low primetime availability on Freeview. ABC1 closed at noon on 26 September 2007, despite its closure initially scheduled for 1 October 2007. The channel was removed from the EPGs immediately afterwards.

On 30 October 2007, the channel's former Sky EPG slot was replaced by a 25-minute timeshift channel of Playhouse Disney.

== See also ==
- Disney Channel
- Playhouse Disney
- Disney Cinemagic
- Disney Jr.
