= Disney Channel (Portugal) =

Spanish-managed Portuguese pay television channel

- Logo used since 1 July 2022
- Country: Spain (license); Portugal (playout)
- Broadcast area: Portugal; Angola; Cape Verde; Mozambique
- Headquarters: Calle de José Bardasano Baos, Madrid, Spain (license); Lisbon, Portugal (playout)

Programming
- Languages: European Portuguese (dubbing; main); English (via SAP); (subtitles in European Portuguese)
- Picture format: HDTV 1080i SDTV 576i 16:9 (downscaled)

Ownership
- Owner: The Walt Disney Company Portugal
- Parent: The Walt Disney Company Iberia S.L. Disney Kids & Family (Disney Entertainment)
- Sister channels: Disney Jr. (Portugal); Star Channel (Portugal); National Geographic (Portugal)

History
- Launched: 28 November 2001; 24 years ago

Links
- Website: tv.disney.pt

Disney Channel is a Spanish-managed Portuguese pay television channel, operated by The Walt Disney Company Portugal; part of The Walt Disney Company Iberia. It was launched on 28 November 2001, as a premium channel, and it was later added to basic packages across platforms. It also broadcast through Angola, Cape Verde and Mozambique via ZAP packages. It is a localized version of the American television channel of the same name.

== History ==
On 19 October 2001, the vice-president of The Walt Disney Company, Roy Disney, signed an agreement with TV Cabo. Disney Channel in Portugal was launched on 28 November 2001, becoming the sixth European version, as a premium channel exclusive to the Portuguese television provider TV Cabo (later known as ZON and now known as NOS), and it was available at a launch price of €5.6 per month, although the channel would also become available by other operators in the following years, with variations in terms of its pricing. The first program to air on the channel was Toy Story at 8pm, in conjunction with its launch, a special event was held that same day at 6:30pm at Pavilhão de Portugal with the participation of Luís de Matos, and the promotional participation of Mickey Mouse and Goofy as well as Buzz Lightyear from Toy Story. The channel was also available free of charge to TVCabo subscribers during the first five days of broadcasting.

Art Attack launched its Portuguese version in the fall of 2002.

A localized website launched in August 2003. On 15 September 2003, with the aim of increasing content aimed at local viewers, a localized version of Playhouse Disney debuted, as well as new movies and series for the fall. The channel had 230,000 subscribers at the time and became open to isolated subscriptions. One of the presenters of the localized Playhouse Disney slot was actor Manuel Sá Pessoa. When Simón Amselem left his post at the Iberian branch in order to focus on the French market in January 2005, José Vila was appointed as director-general of the channel. In November 2003, the channel was added to DStv's Portuguese package in Angola and Mozambique.

For the 2005–2006 television season, the channel premiered Higglytown Heroes, The Suite Life of Zack and Cody and the TVI series O Clube das Chaves, as well as an increased amount of live-action movies in 2006.

In the mid-2000s, it shared many characteristics with other international versions of the channel, for instance broadcasting Disney owned animated and live action series, the Playhouse Disney morning block and The Wonderful World of Disney primetime film block, and also became the primary home of Portuguese television premieres of Disney's theatrical features.

Unlike other versions of the channel throughout Europe, Disney Channel in Portugal never had any original productions produced and made in the actual country excluding a Portuguese version of Art Attack hosted by Pedro Penim, later hosted by Salvador Nery in its revival. In addition to this, Toon Disney, Playhouse Disney or any time shift variants of Disney Channel were never launched as channels in Portugal likely as a result of Portugal having a significant small population compared with those of the United Kingdom, France or Spain.

A secondary Disney television channel would eventually launch in Portugal as Disney Cinemagic on 1 October 2008, a premium channel dedicated to broadcasting for the most part Disney owned movies and some older Disney shows formerly aired on Disney Channel. It was also the first children's channel in Portugal to be available in high definition, with the HD feed launching at the beginning of 2009. Like Disney Channel, Disney Cinemagic was initially a channel exclusive to ZON, but it was eventually added to other operators. It was also around this time that Disney Channel begun to transition from its premium status to basic cable channel, with most of its premium characteristics, like the Portuguese television premieres of Disney films, moving to Disney Cinemagic.

However, Disney Cinemagic failed to attract enough of an audience, which lead to the channel being discontinued at the end of October 2012, and instead being replaced with a Portuguese version of Disney Junior as a channel, which until this point was only a morning block on Disney Channel after it replaced Playhouse Disney on 1 June 2011. Like its predecessors, Disney Junior was originally exclusive to ZON, but within less than a year became available on the other Portuguese television operators, and after completing this on 1 June 2013, the Disney Junior block on Disney Channel was discontinued entirely, due to the existence of Disney Junior as a channel, which like Disney Channel, was mostly a basic cable channel.

Meanwhile, the Portuguese television premiere rights to subsequent Disney films, including productions from Marvel Studios and Lucasfilm, were instead transferred to ZON's own set of premium channels TVCine, previously known as Canais Lusomundo. This deal would be maintained until 2020, due to the launch of Disney+ in Portugal in September of the same year, with the final film to premiere being the 2019 remake of Aladdin on 25 December 2019, with subsequent Disney releases starting with Toy Story 4 instead premiering directly on Disney+, although releases from 20th Century Studios would still premiere on the TVCine channels until 2021. Despite this, a select amount of movies from Touchstone Pictures and 20th Century occasionally air on the TVCine channels, albeit in a much more limited capacity.

Disney XD was also another channel that was absent in Portugal, although this was more a consequence of Fox Kids and Jetix never being launched in Portugal either. Instead certain Disney pop-up channels would occasionally appear exclusively on operator MEO during certain months, being usually themed around certain content absent from Disney Channel at the time. These would eventually become exclusive to NOS starting in 2021. Due to absence of Disney XD, some Disney XD original shows, such as Lab Rats, Wander Over Yonder and Star vs. the Forces of Evil would instead air on Disney Channel, although this led to certain shows such as Penn Zero: Part-Time Hero never being released in Portugal.

During the early 2020s, Disney Channel Portugal began to follow a release schedule much closer to that of Disney Channel Spain, with both channels often sharing premiere dates for new episodes of Disney produced shows, and with Portugal airing Disney productions from Spain, such as Flipante Noa, Clube Houdini and Alya y los Mirror. Both channels, however, still had different schedules. It was also around this time, Disney Channel Portugal began to reair feature films, which had been absent on the channel from 2018, excluding Disney Channel Original Movies. While a limited selection of animated movies from Walt Disney Animation Studios and Pixar aired on the channel, most movie airings around this time consisted of films from DreamWorks Animation and Illumination, likely as a result of these being also broadasted on Star Channel Portugal (previously Fox Portugal), which Disney has owned since 2019, and has shared broadcasting rights across both channels.

Disney Channel closed in Brazil on 1 March 2025, despite this, the Portuguese version was not affected by the shutdown due to the Portuguese market being less reliant on cord-cutting than Brazil, following the example of Latin American channel which also will continue to operate.

== Programming ==
Disney Channel airs live action shows, animated series, short series and films. During its first few years the channel had a mix of shows subtitled in Portuguese and others dubbed, but as the years progressed, all programming for the channel has become fully dubbed in Portuguese.

Since July 2013, most Disney Channel and Disney XD original shows are broadcast with dual audio channels, Portuguese or English, using MPEG2 and AAC standards, respectively.

== Audiences ==
During its first five days of broadcasting, Disney Channel Portugal reached an audience share of 17,8%, 40,3% among children of ages 4 to 14, being the most viewed portuguese cable channel during said timeframe.

In October 2012, Disney Channel Portugal disputed the leadership of subscription television ratings, in terms of daily average, with Canal Hollywood, finishing second for all but one week. However, it was the channel with most shows on the top 15 along the month, ranging from five to nine shows per week.

In 2017, Disney Channel was the most watched children's channel and the fourth most watched channel in Portugal.

Until 2022, the channel reached usually, on a weekly basis, the top 15 most viewed channels in Portugal, and almost remained as the most viewed children's channel in the country. By the end of 2021, it was the fifteenth most watched channel in Portugal, but it began to decline in ratings in the following months and since then it has been usually surpassed by Cartoon Network and even Disney Jr.

== Logos ==
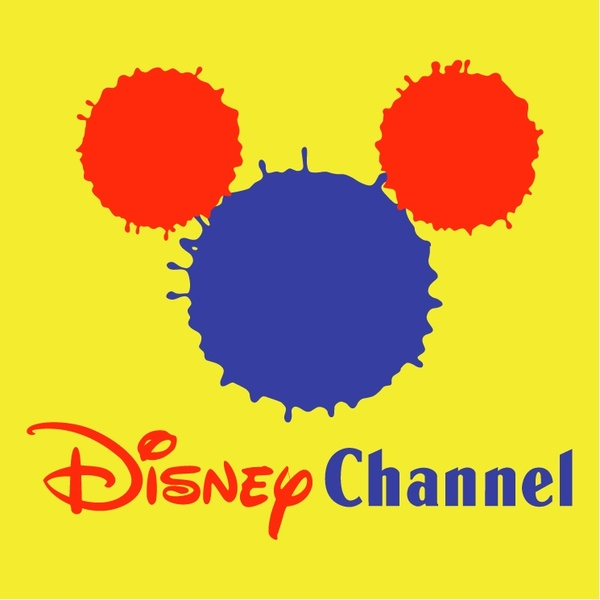
2001–2003

2003–2011

2011–2014

2014–2017

2017–2022

2022–present
