= 24Kitchen =

- Country: Netherlands; Portugal
- Broadcast area: Albania; Bosnia and Herzegovina; Bulgaria; Croatia; Kosovo; Montenegro; North Macedonia; Serbia; Slovenia; Netherlands; Portugal; Angola; Mozambique; Cape Verde

Programming
- Picture format: 1080p60 (HDTV)

Ownership
- Owner: The Walt Disney Company (Disney Entertainment)
- Sister channels: Disney Channel; Disney Junior; Star Channel; Star Comedy; Star Life; Star Crime; Star Movies; BabyTV; ESPN; National Geographic; National Geographic Wild; FX

History
- Launched: List: 1 October 2011; 15 years ago (Netherlands); 1 March 2012; 14 years ago (Portugal); 15 October 2012; 13 years ago (Balkans); 12 December 2012; 13 years ago (Turkey)
- Closed: 31 July 2023; 3 years ago (Turkey); 31 March 2027; 5 months' time (Netherlands)

Links
- Website: www.24kitchen.bg www.24kitchen.com.hr www.24kitchen.nl www.24kitchen.pt www.24kitchen.rs www.24kitchen.si

Availability

Terrestrial
- Digitenne: Channel 24

Streaming media
- Ziggo GO: ZiggoGO.tv(Europe only)

24Kitchen is a pay television channel that airs both one-time and recurring (episodic) programs about food and cooking, owned by Disney Entertainment. The network is currently active in Balkans, Netherlands and Portugal.

The Portuguese version of the channel is modeled out of its Dutch counterpart that has original Portuguese productions with Portuguese cuisine and local chefs, including Ljubomir Stanisic and Rodrigo Meneses, who were contestants in the Portuguese version of MasterChef. Filipa Gomes presents the daily show, Prato do Dia with the remaining being imported programming related to international cuisine.

== History ==
The channel was launched by Fox Networks Group Benelux in cooperation with Jan Dekker Holding, which airs across the Netherlands. It's also available in HD. It launched on 1 October 2011. A preview channel was shown on the UPC Netherlands platform a month before the launch.

The Portuguese version is modeled out of its Dutch counterpart, with original content and international series. It was launched by Fox Networks Group Portugal in 2012 in Portugal and Africa. Later followed by localised versions across Balkans and Turkey.

On 20 March 2019 The Walt Disney Company acquired 21st Century Fox, including Fox Networks Group.

On December 13, 2020, a select number of 24Kitchen programs were made available to stream on Disney+'s Star hub in the Netherlands and Portugal and across multiple countries.

On July 31, 2023, Disney closed the Turkish version of the channel.

On March 31, 2027, 24Kitchen will cease operating as a linear television channel in the Netherlands.

== Programming ==
- Amazing Weddingcakes
- Avec Eric
- Bak met Miljuschka
- Bill's Food
- De Makkelijke Maaltijd
- Fast, Fresh, Simple
- Grenzeloos Koken
- Jamie’s Family Christmas
- Lako, može svako
- Meat vs. Veg
- No Reservations
- Rudolph's Bakery
- The Free Range Cook
- The Taste of Cooking
- The Taste of Life Basics
- The Hairy Bikers Asian Adventure
- The Taste of Life Travel
- Verstip
- Jamie Oliver's Food Revolution

== See also ==
- Fox Networks Group
