= National Geographic Wild (Europe) =

Pan-European pay television channel

- Logo used since 2019
- Country: Germany
- Broadcast area: Europe

Programming
- Picture format: 1080i HDTV (downscaled to 16:9 576i for the SDTV feed)

Ownership
- Owner: National Geographic Society; The Walt Disney Company
- Sister channels: National Geographic; 24Kitchen; Star Life; Star Channel; FX; ESPN; BabyTV; Disney Channel

History
- Launched: 1 March 2007; 19 years ago 1 July 2009; 16 years ago (Romania)
- Replaced: Adventure One (1999–2007)
- Closed: 1 October 2022; 3 years ago (Italy and Russia & Belarus); 1 March 2023; 3 years ago (Scandinavia); 1 January 2025; 17 months ago (France)
- Former names: Nat Geo Wild (2007–2019)

Links
- Website: See listing below

National Geographic Wild is a Pan-European pay television channel that featured documentaries produced by the National Geographic Society. It featured documentaries about nature, wildlife, natural phenomenon, and earth. The channel replaced Adventure One in Europe on 1 March 2007.

== History ==
The channel was launched as Nat Geo Wild on 1 March 2007, replacing Adventure One. The Romanian version of the channel was launched on 1 July 2009 and on 30 September 2019, it launched its HD feed. The channel launched its own high-definition feed in the UK and Ireland on 1 April 2009.

In the Netherlands, the HD feed was launched on 14 October 2010 through Caiway, later followed by KPN (8 February 2011), Glashart Media (14 April 2011), Ziggo (1 September 2011) and UPC Netherlands (1 October 2013).

Nat Geo Wild was rebranded as National Geographic Wild on 1 February 2019.

On 20 March 2019, The Walt Disney Company acquired 21st Century Fox, including Fox Networks Group.

Logo between 2007–2019

== See also ==
- Nat Geo Wild
- National Geographic Channel
- National Geographic Society
