= Nat Geo Wild =

Global television network

National Geographic Wild
- Logo used since 2016
- Country: Hong Kong; Canada; India; Singapore; Spain; United Kingdom; United States; United Arab Emirates; Egypt; Italy; Qatar
- Broadcast area: Asia; Europe; Americas; Middle East; Africa; Oceania
- Headquarters: Washington, D.C.

Programming
- Languages: English; Spanish; Arabic (subtitles); Hindi; Tamil; Telugu
- Picture format: International: 1080p HDTV; United States: 720p HDTV

Ownership
- Owner: The Walt Disney Company (2019-present)
- Parent: National Geographic Global Networks
- Sister channels: ABC; BabyTV; Disney Channel; Fox Life; Disney Jr.; Disney XD; ESPN; ESPN2; ESPNews; Freeform; FX; FXX; FX Movie Channel; FYI; History; History en Espanol; Lifetime; LMN; Longhorn Network; Military History; National Geographic; SEC Network; Vice

History
- Launched: 21 August 2006; 20 years ago (Asia); 1 March 2007; 19 years ago (Europe, Middle East & Africa); 14 October 2007; 19 years ago (Italy); 9 September 2008; 18 years ago (France); 31 July 2009; 17 years ago (India); July 2009; 17 years ago (Romania); 1 November 2009; 17 years ago (Latin America); 15 November 2009; 17 years ago (Australia); March 29, 2010; 16 years ago (United States); 30 August 2010; 16 years ago (Malaysia); 9 September 2011; 15 years ago (Turkey); 1 October 2011; 15 years ago (Japan); 4 October 2011; 15 years ago (Spain); May 7, 2012; 14 years ago (Canada)
- Replaced: Adventure One (UK and International); Fox Reality Channel (United States)
- Closed: 31 January 2021; 5 years ago (Japan); 1 March 2021; 5 years ago (SD feed, Malaysia); 23 September 2021; 5 years ago (Transvision feed, Indonesia); 1 October 2021; 5 years ago (Biznet Home feed, Indonesia); 1 April 2022; 4 years ago (Latin America and Brasil); 1 October 2022; 4 years ago (Italy, Russia and Belarus); 1 February 2023; 3 years ago (Malaysia); 28 February 2023; 3 years ago (Scandinavia); 1 April 2023; 3 years ago (Australia and New Zealand); 1 October 2023; 3 years ago (Southeast Asia, Hong Kong, Taiwan and South Korea)
- Replaced by: Love Nature (Malaysia); Hits Now (Cignal, Philippines)

Availability

Terrestrial
- Nex Parabola (Indonesia): Channel 202
- evotv (Croatia): Channel 108
- Digita (Finland): Channel 84 (SD)
- GOtv (Sub-Saharan Africa): Channel 51
- DStv (Sub-Saharan Africa): Channel 182
- AzamTV (East Africa): Channel 184
- StarTimes (Africa): Channel 221
- Zuku TV (Kenya): Channel 415
- Sky (UK and Ireland): Channel 165; Channel 841 (HD)
- Virgin Media (UK): Channel 182 (HD)

Streaming media
- Service(s): YouTube TV, Hulu + Live TV, FuboTV, Vidgo, Sling TV
- Sky Go (UK): Watch live (UK and Ireland, and Europe only)
- Airtel digital TV HD (India): Channel 434 (Dolby Atmos)

National Geographic Wild (shortened as Nat Geo Wild and abbreviated NGW) is a global wildlife pay television network and the sister network to the National Geographic Channel owned by National Geographic Partners, a joint venture between the Walt Disney Company (73%) and the National Geographic Society (27%). The channel also broadcasts natural history non-fiction programming.

The channel first launched in Hong Kong on 1 January 2006. It later launched in the United Kingdom, Turkey, Ireland, Romania, India, Vietnam, and Poland replacing the now defunct Adventure One. The channel remains the world's first bilingual wildlife service, available in English and Cantonese in the Hong Kong market as well as Tagalog in The Philippines. It launched in Latin America on 1 November 2009 as a high definition channel. In 2010, it launched in the United States.

As of November 2023, Nat Geo Wild is available to approximately 36,000,000 pay television households in the United States, down from its 2019 peak of 61,000,000 households.

In recent years, Nat Geo Wild in the United States has lost carriage with the growth of streaming alternatives including its parent company's Disney+, and has generally been depreciated by Disney in current retransmission consent negotiations with cable and streaming providers. Notably, the channel was removed in negotiations with Verizon Fios in 2025, and was unavailable on Charter Spectrum from 2023 to 2025.

== Availability ==
=== Americas ===
The channel was launched in the United States on 29 March 2010, replacing Fox Reality Channel. Providers which carried the channel at the time of its launch included Time Warner Cable, Comcast, Cox Communications, Verizon Fios and AT&T U-verse. Dish Network did not reach a carriage agreement at launch, but began to broadcast the channel on 19 April 2010. DirecTV didn't carry the channel at the time of its launch either, but it added the channel to its lineup on 30 June. DirecTV added the HD feed on 15 August 2012.

The Latin American version of the channel was launched on 1 November 2009 and ended operations on 31 March 2022, with its content moving to NatGeo, Disney+ and Star+.

=== Internationally ===
==== Africa ====
The channel launched in South Africa on DStv in mid-2009 and is available throughout Sub-Saharan Africa.

==== Southeast Asia ====
In Singapore, the channel is carried on the StarHub TV subscription services. Astro and Unifi TV carried the channel in Malaysia with four language audio tracks included. Some shows on Nat Geo Wild are aired in Filipino (Tagalog) in the Philippines, which also have multiple languages available. Selected shows also aired on Fox Filipino (now defunct).

Nat Geo Wild alongside its sister channel National Geographic has ceased in operation in Southeast Asia on 1 October 2023. Most of the contents were later relocated to Disney+ (or Disney+ Hotstar for Malaysia, Indonesia and Thailand) content hub.

==== East Asia ====
In Hong Kong, the channel is carried on the Now TV subscription services. The channel launched in South Korea on 16 April 2009.

In Japan, the channel launched on 10 January 2011 and its carried on the Sky PerfecTV! subscription services. The Japanese version of the channel was closed on 31 January 2021, after the successful launch of Disney+ in the country; as a result, it was the first Asian feed of the channel to completely cease operations.

As described above, the network went out of operation in Hong Kong, Taiwan and South Korea on 1 October 2023.

==== Middle East and North Africa ====
BeIN (stylized as beIN) carries the channel for Middle Eastern and North African viewers. The channel launched in Israel on 23 July 2008.

==== Australia ====
The Asian version of the channel launched in Australia on 15 November 2009 on Austar and Foxtel.

A high definition feed launched on Foxtel on 1 November 2010. Although the HD feed was expected to launch on Austar in late 2010/early 2011, the channel did not launch until 1 July 2012, after Foxtel acquired Austar.

On 1 February 2015, Nat Geo Wild launched on Australian IPTV service Fetch TV.

On 14 February 2017, the channel was made available in HD for Fetch TV customers.

Nat Geo Wild, alongside National Geographic, officially ceased broadcasting in Australia and New Zealand on 1 April 2023.

==== Canada ====
The Canadian version of Nat Geo Wild launched on May 7, 2012. Similar to National Geographic Channel, this channel is controlled by Corus Entertainment.

==== India ====
The channel launched in India on 31 July 2009. In 2013, a Hindi audiotrack of was launched on the channel. It features 4 audio track, which are in English, Telugu, Hindi and Tamil languages. As of 1 October 2023, the Indian feed is the only one left in Asia.

==== Pan-European feed ====
The channel launched on 1 March 2007 in Europe, and now reaches up to 10.5 million homes in the UK.

==== France ====
A French Nat Geo Wild was launched on 9 September 2008. Its HD feed launched on 8 November 2011. It is available in France, Belgium, Luxembourg, Switzerland, Africa and many other islands.

In France, it was exclusive of Canalsat and Numericable. In 2014, it joined ISP offers, but in 2018 it became a Canal+ exclusive again.

==== Italy ====
On 14 October 2007, an Italian Nat Geo Wild was launched on Sky Italia. It is also available in Switzerland. Its HD feed was launched on 1 February 2012 and a 1-hour timeshift feed on 28 September 2014. The channel shut down on October 1, 2022, alongside the National Geographic channel in Italy.

==== Spain ====
A Spanish Nat Geo Wild was launched on 1 October 2011.

== Nat Geo Wild around the world ==
| Channel | Country or region | Formerly | Launch year | Replacement / rebrand | Shutdown year |
|---|---|---|---|---|---|
| Nat Geo Wild (Latin America) | Latin America | Adventure One | 1 November 2009 | Discontinued | 31 March 2022 |
| Nat Geo Wild (Brazil) | Brazil | Adventure One | 1 November 2009 | Discontinued | 31 March 2022 |
| Nat Geo Wild (Japan) | Japan | Fox Life | 1 October 2011 | Discontinued | 31 January 2021 |
| Nat Geo Wild (Spain) | Spain | Adventure One | 4 October 2011 | - | - |
| Nat Geo Wild (Italy) | Italy | Adventure One | 14 October 2007 | Discontinued | 1 October 2022 |
| Nat Geo Wild (Turkey) | Turkey | Adventure One | 24 February 2007 | - | - |
| Nat Geo Wild (Germany) | Germany | Adventure One | 1 March 2007 | - | - |
| Nat Geo Wild (Asia) | Southeast Asia and Hong Kong | Adventure One | 21 August 2006 | Discontinued | 1 October 2023 |
| Nat Geo Wild (Africa) | Africa | Adventure One | 1 March 2007 | - | - |
| Nat Geo Wild (Poland) | Poland | Adventure One | 1 March 2007 | - | - |
| Nat Geo Wild (Middle East) | Middle East | Adventure One | 1 March 2007 | - | - |
| Nat Geo Wild (Scandinavia) | Finland, Norway, Sweden, Denmark and Faroe Islands | Adventure One | 1 March 2007 | Discontinued | 1 March 2023 |
| Nat Geo Wild (Portugal) | Portugal | Adventure One | 1 March 2007 | - | - |
| Nat Geo Wild (Greece) | Greece | Adventure One | 1 March 2007 | - | - |
| Nat Geo Wild (Russia, Baltics and CIS) | Russia, Belarus, Baltics and CIS | Adventure One | 1 March 2007 | Discontinued (Russia and Belarus) | 1 October 2022 (Russia and Belarus) |
| Nat Geo Wild (Bulgaria) | Bulgaria | Adventure One | 1 March 2007 | - | - |
| Nat Geo Wild (Serbia) | Balkans | Adventure One | 1 March 2007 | - | - |
| Nat Geo Wild (UK and Ireland) | UK and Ireland | Adventure One | 1 March 2007 | - | - |
| Nat Geo Wild (Netherlands) | Netherlands | Adventure One | 1 October 2013 | - | - |
| Nat Geo Wild (Hungary and Romania) | Hungary and Romania | Adventure One | 1 March 2007; 1 July 2009 (Romania) | - | - |
| Nat Geo Wild (Belgium) | Belgium | Adventure One | 1 March 2007 | - | - |

== See also ==
- National Geographic TV
- National Geographic Society
- Nat Geo People
- List of programs broadcast by Nat Geo Wild
