= Star Life (international) =

- Logo used since 2023
- Country: United States

Programming
- Languages: English; Portuguese
- Picture format: HDTV 1080i (downscaled to 16:9 576i or 480i for SD feeds, dependent on market's SD standard)

Ownership
- Owner: The Walt Disney Company Limited (Disney Entertainment)
- Sister channels: 24Kitchen; Star Crime; Star Movies; Star Channel; FX; BabyTV; National Geographic; Disney Channel

History
- Launched: August 27, 2018; 8 years ago (South Africa); February 22, 2021; 5 years ago (Latin America); 1 October 2023; 3 years ago (Bulgaria & Balkans); 7 February 2024; 2 years ago (Portugal); 1 March 2024; 2 years ago (Arab world); 13 April 2024; 2 years ago (India)
- Replaced: Fox Life
- Closed: 31 March 2022; 4 years ago (Latin America); 1 November 2024; 2 years ago (Arab world); 15 March 2025; 20 months ago (India)

Links
- Website: http://starchannel-bg.com/ (Bulgaria) http://starchannel-rs.com/ (Serbia) http://www.starchannel-si.com/ (Slovenia) https://www.starchannel-hr.com/ (Croatia) https://www.startv.pt/ (Portugal)

Star Life is an international pay television network, owned by Disney Entertainment, a division of The Walt Disney Company, as a replacement to Fox Life. The network has been discontinued in Latin America, Arab world, India and is currently active in Portugal, Bulgaria, South Africa, and Balkans.

The network's scheduling has varied with each version, ranging from traditional entertainment programming, including television series, sitcoms and movies, among others, original programming in certain regions, and instructional and aspirational reality television on some other variations.

== History ==
Star Life was originally launched in South Africa in August 2018 by Star India to showcase programming from their library which included series, films, and variety programming.

On 20 March 2019 The Walt Disney Company acquired 21st Century Fox, including Fox Networks Group.

On 27 November 2020, Disney announced that they would be renaming the Fox branded channels in Latin America to Star Life on 22 February 2021.

On January 10, 2022, it was announced that the Latin American version of Star Life would be shut down on March 31 along with several other networks in the regions with the Brazilian version of the channel being replaced with Cinecanal.

On June 7, 2023, Disney announced that the Fox channels in Bulgaria and Balkans (including Fox Crime, Fox Life and Fox Movies) would be rebranded to have the "Star" name instead with the brand being revived after Disney extinguished the brand year prior with Star Channel, Star Crime and Star Life being rebranded on October 1, 2023.

On November 27, 2023, Disney has announced that Portuguese-language Fox channels (including Fox Crime, Fox Life, Fox Comedy and Fox Movies) would rebrand to "Star" on 7 February 2024.

On March 1, 2024, Fox Life was rebranded as Star Life in the Middle East. It closed on November 1, 2024.

On March 14, 2024, Disney announced that Fox Life would be rebranded as Star Life in India on April 13, 2024. However, the channel got shut down on March 15, 2025.

== Star Life around the world ==
Channel	Country or region	Formerly	Launch year	Replacement / rebrand	Shutdown / rebrand date
Star Life (Portugal)	Portugal	Fox Life	February 7, 2024	-	-
Star Life (Latin America)	Latin America	Fox Life	February 22, 2021	discontinued	March 31, 2022
Star Life (Bulgaria)	Bulgaria	Fox Life	October 1, 2023	-	-
Star Life (Balkans)	Balkans	Fox Life	October 1, 2023	-	-
Star Life (India)	India	Fox Life	April 13, 2024	discontinued	March 15, 2025
Star Life (Africa)	Africa	-	August 27, 2018	-	-
Star Life (Arab world)	Arab world	Fox Life	March 1, 2024	discontinued	November 1, 2024

== See also ==
- FX Life
