= Star Crime =

- Country: United States
- Broadcast area: the Balkans, Bulgaria and Portugal

Programming
- Languages: English; Portuguese
- Picture format: 576i SDTV

Ownership
- Owner: The Walt Disney Company Limited (Disney Entertainment)
- Sister channels: Star Life, Star Comedy, Star Channel, BabyTV, National Geographic, Nat Geo Wild, Nat Geo People

History
- Launched: List: 1 October 2023; 3 years ago (Bulgaria & Balkans); 7 February 2024; 2 years ago (Portugal)
- Replaced: Fox Crime

Links
- Website: http://starchannel-bg.com/ (Bulgaria) http://starchannel-rs.com/ (Serbia) http://www.starchannel-si.com/ (Slovenia) https://www.starchanneltv-hr.com/ (Croatia) https://www.startv.pt/ (Portugal)

Star Crime is a television network, owned by the Disney Entertainment division of The Walt Disney Company, used as replacement of Fox Crime. Its basic programming include numerous television series, sitcoms and movies, among others, related to crime, horror and investigation.

As of February 2024, the channel is active in three regions: the Balkans, Bulgaria and Portugal. The rebranding took place on October 1, 2023 for the Balkans and Bulgaria which replacing Fox Crime and on February 7, 2024 for Portugal.

== See also ==
- Fox Crime
