= Disney Cinemagic =

Defunct European programming block and television channel brand

- Country: United Kingdom
- Broadcast area: Western Europe
- Headquarters: United Kingdom

Programming
- Picture format: 1080i HDTV
- Timeshift service: Disney Cinemagic +1 (Closed)

Ownership
- Owner: Disney Channels Worldwide; The Walt Disney Company Limited (50%) Sky plc (50%); (Walt Disney Direct-to-Consumer and International)
- Sister channels: Disney Channel; Disney XD; Disney Jr.

History
- Launched: 16 March 2006; 20 years ago (UK); 4 September 2007; 18 years ago (France); 1 July 2008; 17 years ago (Spain); 1 October 2008; 17 years ago (Portugal); 4 July 2009; 16 years ago (Germany); 3 December 2011; 14 years ago (Italy)
- Replaced: Toon Disney (UK & Ireland, France and Spain)
- Closed: 1 November 2012; 13 years ago (Portugal); 28 March 2013; 13 years ago (UK); 1 January 2015; 11 years ago (Spain); 8 May 2015; 11 years ago (France); 30 June 2019; 6 years ago (Italy) 30 September 2019; 6 years ago (Germany)
- Replaced by: Sky Movies Disney, later Sky Cinema (UK & Ireland); Disney Jr. (Portugal); Disney Cinema (France); Disney+

Links
- Website: http://cinemagic.disney.de

Disney Cinemagic was a European programming block and television channel brand that was used from 2006 to 2019, owned by The Walt Disney Company (UK) (50%) Sky plc (50%) and operated by the Disney Channels Worldwide division of The Walt Disney Company. It was broadcast in most countries in Western Europe; starting in the mid-2010s, formerly-branded Disney Cinemagic channels, including France (Disney Cinema) and the United Kingdom and Ireland (Sky Movies Disney), were run by third parties which primarily aired films by Walt Disney Studios, however, most of these channels shut down after Disney+ launched in 2019.

== History ==
Disney Cinemagic was launched in the UK and Ireland on 16 March 2006 on BSkyB's premium package. On 4 September 2007, the France version of Disney Cinemagic was launched.

On 30 November 2007 at 8:30pm, Disney Cinemagic HD launched in France, broadcasting on CANALSAT from 6am to 1am daily, making Disney Cinemagic the first children and family HDTV channel in France. In December 2008, Disney Cinemagic HD was launched in the UK with programming in high definition with initial availability through Sky+ HD with a Sky Movies subscription. In October 2008, Disney Cinemagic Portugal was launched, and in January 2009, Disney Cinemagic HD was launched, being the first children's/family-oriented channel in Portugal to have an HD feed, with SIC K being the second.

In November 2012, Disney Cinemagic Portugal was replaced by Disney Junior, while its HD feed was rebranded as Disney Movies on Demand.

On 28 March 2013, Disney Cinemagic was replaced in the UK with Sky Movies Disney, as part of a deal between BSkyB and Disney which allowed Sky to stream Disney movies on Sky's video-on-demand services. The last program broadcast on Disney Cinemagic UK was an episode of Lilo & Stitch: The Series. In a similar move in Australia, Foxtel launched Foxtel Movies Disney in April 2014, along with Disney XD.

Disney Cinemagic Spain closed in January 2015. Disney Cinemagic France was replaced by Disney Cinema in May 2015. Sky rebranded its Sky Movies channels to Sky Cinema, including Sky Movies Disney, in July 2016. On 31 December 2020, Sky Cinema Disney closed.

Duplicating the Sky Movies Disney arrangement in the UK, Movistar+ launched Movistar Disney in December 2017. The channel later closed after Disney+ was launched.

Disney Cinemagic, along with all other international Disney Channels, including Disney Channel, Disney Junior and Disney XD were transferred from Disney–ABC Television Group, part of Disney Media Networks, to Disney Direct-to-Consumer and International on 14 March 2018.

On 30 September 2019, at 11:53 pm, Disney Cinemagic Germany closed with Zenon: Z3 being its last program. The channel was replaced with Sky Cinema Special, thus bringing an end to Disney Cinemagic after 13 years. The first film broadcast on the German feed of Sky Cinema Special was The Greatest Showman at 12am on 1 October 2019.

== Versions ==
Market	Name	Type	Formerly	Launch date	Replacement	Replace date
United Kingdom, Ireland	Cinemagic	channel	Toon Disney	16 March 2006	Sky Movies Disney	28 March 2013
France, Belgium, Switzerland, Luxembourg	Cinemagic	channel	Toon Disney	4 September 2007	Disney Cinema	8 May 2015
Spain, Andorra	Cinemagic	channel	Toon Disney	1 July 2008	N/A	1 January 2015
Germany, Austria, Switzerland	Cinemagic	channel		4 July 2009	Sky Cinema Special	30 September 2019
Germany, Austria, Switzerland	Cinemagic HD	channel, HD		4 July 2009	Sky Cinema Special HD	30 September 2019
United Kingdom, Ireland	Cinemagic +1	channel, timeshift			N/A	28 March 2013
France, Belgium, Switzerland, Luxembourg	Cinemagic +1	channel, timeshift	Toon Disney +1		Disney Cinema +1	8 May 2015
Spain, Andorra	Cinemagic +1	channel, timeshift	Toon Disney +1		N/A	1 January 2015
Portugal	Cinemagic	channel		1 October 2008	Disney Junior	1 November 2012
France, Belgium, Switzerland, Luxembourg	Cinemagic HD	channel, HD		30 November 2008	Disney Cinema	8 May 2015
Spain, Andorra	Cinemagic HD	channel, HD		1 July 2010	N/A	1 January 2015
United Kingdom, Ireland	Cinemagic HD	channel, HD		1 December 2008	Sky Movies Disney HD	28 March 2013
Portugal	Cinemagic HD	channel, HD		1 January 2009	Disney Movies on Demand	1 November 2012
Italy	Cinemagic	block, weekends on Sky Cinema Family		3 December 2011	N/A	30 June 2019
Scandinavia	Cinemagic	block, weekends 19:00 CET on Disney Channel			N/A	2014

=== Other channels ===
Market	Name	Type	Formerly	Launch date	Replacement	Replace date
United Kingdom, Ireland	Sky Cinema Disney	channel	Cinemagic	28 March 2013	Sky Cinema Five Star Movies	31 December 2020
United Kingdom, Ireland	Sky Cinema Disney HD	channel, HD	Cinemagic HD	2013	Sky Cinema Five Star Movies HD	31 December 2020
Australia	Foxtel Movies Disney	channel		10 April 2014	Foxtel Movies Kids	7 November 2019
France, Belgium, Switzerland, Luxembourg	Disney Cinema	channel, HD	Cinemagic	8 May 2015	Disney+	1 May 2020
New Zealand	Sky Movies Disney	channel, HD		1 July 2015	Sky Movies Family	31 October 2019
Spain	Movistar Disney	channel, HD		22 December 2017	Disney+	31 March 2020
Middle East and North Africa	OSN Movies Disney	channel HD		1 March 2018		

== See also ==
- Foxtel Movies
- Sky Cinema
- OSN Movies
