= BabyTV =

Television channel

- Country: United Kingdom; Israel
- Broadcast area: Worldwide
- Headquarters: London

Programming
- Picture format: 1080i HDTV (downscaled to 576i/480i for the SD feed)

Ownership
- Owner: Talit Communications (Israel); The Walt Disney Company Limited (International)
- Sister channels: List: Disney Channel; Disney Jr.; Disney XD; ABC; ACC Network; Localish; ESPN; Freeform; FX; FXX; FXM; National Geographic; Nat Geo Wild

History
- Launched: 4 December 2003; 22 years ago (Israel); 4 July 2005; 21 years ago (international); 1 April 2007; 19 years ago (Argentina); 29 February 2012; 14 years ago (streaming service)
- Closed: 31 January 2021; 5 years ago (Japan); 1 February 2022; 4 years ago (Malaysia); 9 June 2022; 4 years ago (Latvia); 1 October 2022; 4 years ago (Italy, Russia and Belarus); 15 March 2023; 3 years ago (India); 1 October 2023; 3 years ago (Southeast Asia, Hong Kong and South Korea); 1 January 2024; 2 years ago (Taiwan); 1 March 2025; 20 months ago (Brazil); 30 September 2025; 13 months ago (France); 1 August 2026; 3 months ago (EMEA); 7 August 2026; 3 months ago (Canada); 1 September 2026; 2 months ago (streaming service)

Links
- Website: www.babytv.com (redirects to tv.disney.es

Availability

Streaming media
- Service(s): Sling TV, YouTube TV

BabyTV (stylised as Babytv) is a multilingual, international television channel for babies, toddlers and preschoolers aged 4 or lower. In Israel, the channel is owned and operated by Talit Communications while The Walt Disney Company Limited (the international division of The Walt Disney Company) controls ownership and operations in all other territories. The channel is headquartered in London with television distribution handled by Disney subsidiaries across the world. The channel first launched in 2003 in Israel and 2005 in the United Kingdom. BabyTV is distributed in over 100 countries, broadcasting in 18 languages (as of 2013). The channel broadcasts shows without television commercial interruptions. In the United States, the channel is distributed by Disney Entertainment Television.

== History ==
=== Founding ===
BabyTV was first developed in December 2003 as an educational block for babies and toddlers in Israel by Ron Isaak, Maya and Liran Talit and members of their families. The Talits relocated to London to establish International Baby TV. Their first international deal was with Télévision Par Satellite in France.

The first six programs to air on BabyTV were "Hands Up", "Tulli", "Bouncy Balls", "Jammers", "Little Chick" and "1, 2, 3, Tell A Story".

=== News Corp acquisition and international expansion ===
In October 2007, News Corp's Fox International Channels acquired a majority stake in BabyTV, placing it alongside its international offerings of Fox Crime, Fox, National Geographic and others.

In 2006, Indovision and Dori Media International launched Baby TV in Indonesia. Rebranded as Vision 3 Baby and dubbed in Indonesian, it has the same program content and schedules as BabyTV Asia. Vision 3 Baby has since been replaced by the international version of BabyTV. The channel was also launched on Sky Digital in the UK on 5 February 2007. In January 2008, StarHub brought it to Singapore and ONO in Spain. By this time, BabyTV was also available in South Korea through MegaTV and HanaTV, Taiwan via Yoyo TV, on VTV3 in Vietnam, and on FoxHD and the National Geographic Channel in Japan. In October, the channel was added to Daarsat in Nigeria.

On July 7, 2007, Baby TV began broadcasting in the CIS and Baltic countries. The channel broadcasts exclusively in English, but since 2013 programs in Russian have been posted on the YouTube channel and on services. BabyTV was added on Cablevision and Multicanal on April 1st, 2007.

In 2008, French authorities banned the broadcasting of programs aimed at children under the age of 3, and ordered warnings to be included on foreign channels available in France such as BabyTV and its competitor BabyFirst.

The channel, along with Fox Crime and Fox, was launched in India on 25 March 2009. In June, a localized Spanish-language channel was added to Sky Mexico. The following month, it was also added to Sky Italia. In July 2010, it was announced that Fox and Asia Television Limited would bring BabyTV to Hong Kong through Now TV.

In January 2011, RRsat signed an agreement with BabyTV to distribute the channel to North America via Intelsat's Galaxy 23 satellite. In February, BabyTV was added to Spanish-language packages on DishLATINO. In May, it launched in Malaysia via Astro. In December, BabyTV was launched in the Philippines via Sky Cable.

BabyTV announced the standalone streaming service launched on February 29, 2012. In June 2012, the channel was brought to Japan in partnership with J:COM. In October, BabyTV premiered on mio TV (now known as Singtel TV) in Singapore. That same month, Pixel TV in Ukraine added the channel. In November 2016, BabyTV was added to Sling TV as part of the company's offering for children.

On September 24, 2013, Fox International Channels collaborates with 13TV to make a morning block of BabyTV from weekends at 9:45am in Spain. It is also available on beIN Network with Arabic language.

=== Disney acquisition and discontinuation in certain territories and TV providers ===
On March 20, 2019, The Walt Disney Company finalized its acquisition of 21st Century Fox. BabyTV became a part of Walt Disney Direct-to-Consumer & International with US distribution being taken over by Walt Disney Television. It was considered a surplus asset in the deal, due to its properties having no connection to any existing Disney properties or characters, and Disney Junior was already Disney's major preschool and toddler brand. The company already had dealt with various issues regarding screen time for newborns and toddlers (including its own controversial Baby Einstein franchise it sold off in 2013), so BabyTV has become de facto depreciated over time by its new ownership.

On 31 January 2021, Japanese cable providers stopped airing BabyTV. On 1 September 2021, BabyTV ceased broadcasting on Now TV.

On 1 October 2021, BabyTV and numerous other Disney-owned channels would end transmissions in Southeast Asia. On 18 October 2021, Disney announced that it would close down BabyTV in India alongside Star World and Star World Premiere HD on 15 March 2023, following similar decisions taken worldwide to close down English general entertainment channels.

In January 2022, Astro informed its customers that BabyTV would be replaced by Moonbug Kids starting in February.

On 9 June 2022, BabyTV ceased broadcasting in Latvia, because the TV license was from Russia.

On 1 October 2022, BabyTV alongside with National Geographic and Nat Geo Wild were closed down in Italy, Russia and Belarus discontinuing all active linear TV services owned by Disney in those countries, apart from Disney Channel in Russia. BabyTV is still available in Russian and Italian on YouTube. That same month in 2022, BabyTV was removed from Dish Network.

Baby Network Limited was liquidated in September 2023. That same month, Charter Communications in the United States dropped BabyTV and its Spanish language simulcast, among several other channels, from Spectrum to retain carriage of other Disney networks and pick up Disney+ streaming plans. Focusing solely on Disney+ and Disney+ Hotstar, The Walt Disney Company ceased broadcasting in Southeast Asia, Hong Kong and South Korea on October 1, 2023, services in Taiwan were shut down on January 1, 2024. Since 2024, BabyTV has been managed by Disney's European, Middle East and African division.

On March 28, 2024, BabyTV's transmission in The Netherlands, Portugal, and Scandinavia was hijacked to broadcast Russian propaganda. After a second incident on April 17; the network was pulled and moved to a new transponder with increased security. The network remains available in Armenia, and archived content from the network in Russian remains available on YouTube.

On December 2, 2024, The Walt Disney Company announced that BabyTV would end in Brazil along with its sister channels (except for its ESPN channels) on February 28, 2025. In Hispanic America, the channel will continue to operate.

On April 29, 2025, Liquid Rock Entertainment was named as the international distributor for BabyTV's catalogue, acting on behalf of Disney Platform Distribution.

On September 30, 2025, BabyTV closed down in France.

On August 7, 2026, BabyTV closed down in Canada.

On August 21, 2026, Disney announced that the standalone BabyTV app would shut down on September 1, 2026, with select content from the app moved to Disney+.

== Topics ==
BabyTV's original programming library, which is developed in-house in co-operation with childhood development experts and content experts is built around nine developmental topics, which cover all early learning skills and developmental milestones for babies and toddlers.

The nine categories, include the following. They are:

- First Concepts
- Nature & Animals
- Music & Art
- Imagination & Creativity
- Building Friendships
- Songs & Rhymes
- Guessing Games
- Activities
- Bedtime

== On demand ==
BabyTV's video on demand service features edited segments of BabyTV programming, categorized into their nine developmental themes, in hundreds of half hour segments and is available in languages including English, French, Spanish, Portuguese, Mandarin and Turkish. The on-demand channel is available on Singtel TV. It will be launched to StarHub TV in Singapore and other pay TV providers in Asia in the future.

== Home video ==
BabyTV has introduced a DVD offering. "My First Years Library" is a library that covers early learning skills and developmental milestones that children encounter in their first years. BabyTV's DVD collection features segments of BabyTV content and includes some of the channel's leading characters, such as Pitch & Potch, & Kenny & Goorie.
