= Harriet the Spy: Blog Wars =

- DVD cover
- Based on: Harriet the Spy by Louise Fitzhugh
- Written by: Heather Conkie; Alexandra Clarke
- Directed by: Ron Oliver
- Starring: Jennifer Stone; Vanessa Morgan; Alexander Conti; Melinda Shankar; Jayne Eastwood; Wesley Morgan
- Composer: Trevor Yuile
- Countries of origin: Canada; United States
- Original language: English

Production
- Producer: Jonathan Hackett
- Cinematography: Alwyn Kumst
- Editor: Ben Wilkinson
- Running time: 87 minutes
- Production company: 9 Story Entertainment

Original release
- Network: Movie Central; The Movie Network
- Release: March 19, 2010
- Network: Disney Channel
- Release: March 26, 2010

Related
- Harriet the Spy

Harriet the Spy: Blog Wars is a 2010 television film that premiered on March 19, 2010, on Movie Central and The Movie Network in Canada, and on March 26, 2010, on Disney Channel in the United States. Starring Jennifer Stone, it is an adaptation of the book Harriet the Spy, by Louise Fitzhugh, the second after the 1996 Harriet the Spy film that starred Michelle Trachtenberg as Harriet. The film was produced by 9 Story Entertainment.

The film centers on Harriet M. Welsch (Jennifer Stone), an 11-year-old in the book, changed to a teenager for the film. Jennifer Stone told Popstar magazine, "We're basing it off the charm of the first book. They aged Harriet up to 16, and it still deals with mean girls, except it matures that a little. It's a bit more of mean girls having to do with gossip and heartthrobs and all that. The first book was written in the 60's so we're trying to bring it up to 2010. We're putting our own spin on it."

It is the first film released on Disney Channel since 1997 that was not a "Disney Channel Original Movie" and the first released through 9 Story Entertainment. It was co-produced in association with Disney Channel and Canadian pay TV channels Movie Central and The Movie Network. However, according to the Disney Channel website, the film is listed as a Disney Channel Original Movie.

== Plot ==
Young spy Harriet M. Welsch (Jennifer Stone) crosses paths with popular student Marion Hawthorne (Vanessa Morgan), as the two girls compete to become the official blogger of their high school class. After Marion has started blogging, Harriet lags behind because she reports what she finds interesting. Unfortunately for Harriet, her classmates do not share her views and state that her blog is boring. Harriet's nanny, Golly, suggests that she write something is of interest to both Harriet and her classmates.

Harriet sets her sights on a big pop star, Skander Hill (Wesley Morgan), who is in town starring in a movie, Spy Teen 2: The Sequel, that her father, Roger Welsch (Doug Murray), is producing. However, Violetta Welsch (Shauna MacDonald) claims that Harriet has a crush on Skander. Despite her disdain for the star of the film, Harriet starts blogging about Skander Hill. First, she goes to stalk him by doing a father/daughter visit, but Skander has an outburst and Harriet is forced off of the set.

When Harriet goes to the hotel where Skander is staying, she finds him arguing with other producers of the movie. When he switches shirts, Harriet notices a birth-mark on him and takes a picture, also stealing a water bottle. It only makes the other students love him more. Marion and her friends invite Harriet over and watch "Spy Teen". She lies and runs downstairs to talk to Skander. However, it is Sport pretending to be Skander. The posse gets excited, but Marion's still suspicious.

The next time Harriet goes to the hotel, she disguises herself as a maid and steals a hotel receipt signed by Skander, but Skander notices her, and she runs away. She shows Marion the signature, but Marion claims it is a forgery. Skander spots Harriet stalking him and follows her to Janie's house. Meanwhile, Harriet's friends decide to cut off their friendship with her because she is too obsessed with Skander. They feel left out and claim that Harriet is befriending the people whom she once despised. While leaving, Harriet bumps into a chemical made by her eco-friend. This causes a loud noise to emanate from Janie's room, which Skander believes to be someone trying to blow him up.

Back at the set, Skander accidentally starts a food fight, which Harriet tries to record, but she notices her father and does not record. When she follows her nanny Golly, she deduces she has a boyfriend. After a long argument, Harriet figures out that Golly is leaving, which causes an uproar in the family. Marion asks Harriet for real proof. Harriet goes back to the set and is put in as an extra, and later Skander comes up to her and devotes his anger to her, while she was recording.

Soon after, she puts the rant on her blog, which Marion puts on the web. Skander quits the movie because he realizes Roger's daughter is the spy. Harriet soon gets back with her friends, and Sport makes a basket. Harriet gives Skander a heartfelt apology, but Skander still quits because he wanted her to stop her blog, but Roger will not allow that, as he believes Harriet is an avid writer. Then Skander gets a major role in another movie. He hugs Harriet and kisses her on the cheek, and then he rejoins the movie, returning everything to normal.

Harriet gets the blog (while Marion loses because she violated the rules to publicize Skander's rant), and at the end, magazines show a possible relationship between Skander and Harriet.

== Cast ==
- Jennifer Stone as Harriet M. Welsch
- Alexander Conti as Simon "Sport" Rocque
- Melinda Shankar as Janie Gibbs
- Jayne Eastwood as Ms. Elson
- Shauna MacDonald as Violetta Welsch
- Wesley Morgan as Skander Hill
- Vanessa Morgan as Marion Hawthorne
- Doug Murray as Roger Welsch
- Aislinn Paul as Beth Ellen Hansen
- Kiana Madeira as Rachel Lewis
- Martin Roach as Alfred Cooper
- Kristin Booth as Katherine "Ole Golly"

== International releases ==
Country	Network(s)	Premiere	Title in Country
Canada	The Movie Network and Movie Central	March 19, 2010	Harriet the Spy: Blog Wars
United States	Disney Channel	March 26, 2010	Harriet the Spy: Blog Wars
Australia	Disney Channel Australia	June 19, 2010	Harriet the Spy: Blog Wars
New Zealand	Disney Channel Australia	June 19, 2010	Harriet the Spy: Blog Wars
Argentina	Disney Channel Latin America	June 27, 2010	Harriet la Espía: Guerra de Blogs
Mexico	Disney Channel Latin America	June 27, 2010	Harriet la Espía: Guerra de Blogs
Chile	Disney Channel Latin America	June 27, 2010	Harriet la Espía: Guerra de Blogs
Venezuela	Disney Channel Latin America	June 27, 2010	Harriet la Espía: Guerra de Blogs
Brazil	Disney Channel Latin America	June 27, 2010	Harriet a Espiã: Guerra de Blogs
Germany	Disney Channel Germany	July 9, 2010	Harriet: Spionage aller Art
Austria	Disney Channel Germany	July 9, 2010	Harriet: Spionage aller Art
South Africa	Disney Channel Africa	July 16, 2010	Harriet the Spy: Blog Wars
United Kingdom	Disney Channel UK & Ireland	July 23, 2010	Harriet the Spy: Blog Wars
Ireland	Disney Channel UK & Ireland	July 23, 2010	Harriet the Spy: Blog Wars
Spain	Disney Channel Spain	July 24, 2010	Harriet La Espia: Guerras del Blog
Russia	Disney Channel Russia	October 6, 2010	Шпионка Хэриэт: Война блогов
Israel	Disney Channel Israel	October 7, 2010	הארייט ומלחמת הבלוגים
Italy	Disney Channel Italy	October 22, 2010	Harriet la spia
Iran	IRIB TV2	May 20, 2011	جاسوس هريت و جنگهاي وبلاگي
France	Disney Channel France	October 27, 2010	Harriet L'espionne : La Guerre Des Blogs
Netherlands	Disney Channel (Netherlands/Flanders)	October 22, 2010	Harriet the Spy: Blog Wars
Belgium	Disney Channel (Netherlands/Flanders)	December 24, 2010	Harriet the Spy: Blog Wars
Poland	Disney Channel Poland	December 18, 2010	Harriet szpieguje: Wojna blogów
Romania	Disney Channel Romania	December 18, 2010	Harriet Spioana: Războiul Blogurilor
Hungary	Disney Channel Hungary	December 18, 2010	Harriet A Kém : Blog háború
Czech Republic	Disney Channel Czech	December 18, 2010	Válka blogerek
Slovakia	Disney Channel Czech	December 18, 2010	Válka blogerek
Bulgaria	Disney Channel Bulgaria	December 18, 2010.	Хариет Шпионина: блог Войни
Arab World	Disney Channel Middle East	December, 2010	Harriet the Spy (as a part of holiday special)
Greece	Disney Channel Greece	December 25, 2010	Xάρριετ η Κατάσκοπος: Πόλεμος στο Διαδίκτυο Internet Wars (as a part of Christmas holiday special)
Turkey	Disney Channel Türkiye	December 25, 2010	Ajan Herriet Günlük Savaşları (as a part of Christmas holiday special)
