= Sadie Sparks =

2019 television series

- Genre: Comedy; Fantasy
- Created by: Brónagh O'Hanlon
- Developed by: Jennie Stacey
- Written by: Rebecca Hobbs
- Directed by: Brónagh O'Hanlon
- Voices of: Georgia Lock; Rufus Hound; Joshua LeClair; Dominique Moore
- Opening theme: "Let's Be Like Sadie Sparks" by Jade Alleyne
- Composers: Jean-Luc Daniel; Jonathan Ménard
- Countries of origin: Ireland; France
- Original languages: English; French
- No. of seasons: 1
- No. of episodes: 26 (52 segments)

Production
- Executive producers: Pierre Sissmann; Darragh O'Connell; Dominique Bourse; Cathal Gaffney
- Producers: Theresa Mayer; Caroline Audebert; Hélène Maret
- Editors: Fergal Costello; Louise Finn
- Running time: 22 minutes (2 11-minute segments)
- Production companies: Brown Bag Films; Cyber Group Studios

Original release
- Network: Disney Channel (UK & Ireland); Disney Channel (France)
- Release: 20 April – 4 December 2019

Sadie Sparks is an animated comedy-fantasy television series that aired on Disney Channel in the UK and Ireland on 20 April 2019 followed by its airing on Disney Channel in France on 26 May 2019. The series was created by Bronagh O'Hanlon and is a co-production between Brown Bag Films in Ireland and Cyber Group Studios in France.

== Plot ==
Sadie Sparks is set in the fictional American town of Harmony, and revolves around the adventures of Sadie, a teenage girl who discovers she has magical abilities and becomes a magician-in-training. She receives the guidance of a grumpy, magical, talking bunny, Gilbert, who was sent to the human world from the Magical Realm to train Sadie and keep her powers under control, but with this new responsibility, Sadie must also balance high school life.

Throughout the series, it is established and hinted that there is a weak, unstable and dangerous connection between the human world and the Magical Realm, with rifts frequently growing between both worlds that can be closed with an incredibly sticky magic glue substance. These rifts usually cause magical beings and artifacts to fall into Harmony. By the end of the series, the largest rift yet grows between both worlds, and Sadie, with her newfound strengthened magical abilities, manages to close it while risking her life, encouraged by her friends' immense support. The Wardens of Wizardry are still left fearing that this will be the first of larger rifts to come.

== Characters ==
=== Main ===
- Sadie Josephine Sparks (voiced by Georgia Lock) – A 14-year-old girl who realizes she's a magician-in-training. She can be excitable and helpful but often lazy. However, she always likes to use her magical abilities for personal gain or to help her friends, even if there are consequences. In response to shocking situations, Sadie sprouts her own personal catchphrase of "Oh, my giddy!", a line created by head writer Rebecca Hobbs. Gradually over the course of the series, Sadie struggles with and doubts her wizardry potential and eventually masters her now amplified abilities. Sadie's characteristics were inspired by those of O'Hanlon and Hobbs.
- Gilbert (voiced by Rufus Hound) – An ancient 700-year-old rabbit who trains Sadie in her wizard skills. Although he is grumpy, sarcastic, and harsh, deep down, he can more often than not be fun-loving and understanding. Being a mentor of the most well-known wizards of all time, he typically has high expectations for Sadie and becomes frustrated by the problems caused by her magic. Gilbert is shown to live in a black magician's hat with a purple ribbon, which leads directly to his library-like apartment in the Magical Realm. He is also the mascot of Harmony High; this position grants him special access to the school while also keeping his mystical nature secret. When he's not mentoring Sadie or supporting Harmony High's basketball team, he usually watches his favorite TV series, a melodrama called "Best Frenemies."
- Teepee (voiced by Joshua LeClair) – One of Sadie's friends. He is an overweight, fun-loving teenage boy who loves pop culture, comic books and sci-fi movies; because of these interests, he usually fantasizes about becoming or meeting a superhero or giant monster. He is fully aware of Sadie being a wizard and helps her with her magical needs.
- Lulu (voiced by Dominique Moore) – Sadie's best friend. She is of African-American descent and is a very shy girl, but she is incredibly smart and knowledgeable with a short temper. She also loves cats and is frequently caught watching popular cat videos on the internet. Like Teepee, she knows Sadie is a wizard and helps her with her magical needs.

=== Recurring ===
- Selina Sparks (voiced by Laura Aikman) – The mother of Sadie and Max and the local journalist of Harmony. Although she is frequently stressed out about her job and is constantly yelled at by her boss, she loves and supports her daughter no matter what. Like Gilbert, she is a fan of Best Frenemies, and bears a strong resemblance to one of the characters, Diana.
- Maxwell "Max" Sparks (voiced by Joshua LeClair) – Sadie's annoying younger brother who is an aspiring scientist, although his inventions always go awry. He also has a crush on Lulu.
- Sam (voiced by Sammy Moore) – Sadie's love interest and captain of the school basketball team. Multiple times in the series, Sadie attempts to romantically pursue Sam, but her magic always complicates the situations. However, Sam also, but secretly, loves Sadie, and by the episode "Groundhog Date", they are officially a couple.
- Valerie "Val" Garcia (voiced by Laura Aikman) – Sadie's unfriendly rival. She is most likely of Latina descent. She will take any opportunity to make Sadie's life miserable, and is selfishly willing to make everything go her way. She also has a crush on Sam, but only for his popularity, unlike Sadie who loves him for who he really is. Deep down, Val can be truly sympathetic and caring for others' well-being, as revealed in the episode "The Double Dare Scare".
- Blaine (voiced by Tyger Drew-Honey) – Sadie's magician rival who speaks in a British accent and was born and raised in the Magical Realm. He is cocky, lazy and constantly ridicules Sadie as well as complicating her magic-related tasks, believing he is much better than her. But deep down, Blaine has a crush on Sadie and cares for her. He also comes from a long line of dark wizards.
- Cornelius (voiced by Craig Revel Horwood) – A talking magical snake who is Blaine's scornful mentor. He makes long hissing noises every time he pronounces an 's' sound, and has a love-hate relationship with Gilbert. Antithesizing Gilbert, he lives within a red baseball cap, and often spends his days in a glass container in the school's science lab.
- Principal Winifred Eugenia Covert (voiced by Morwenna Banks) – The small but bossy, powerful and conniving headmistress of Harmony High. When she's not making the lives of the students of Harmony High miserable, she secretly works for a government agency simply referred to as "the Department", and is obsessed with finding proof of magic, but her attempts always fail her, especially when it comes to getting the department to spot the mystical activity in Harmony. She also has a hatred for rabbits, and tries to get rid of Gilbert whenever she has the chance. In the series finale, "Oh-My-Giddy!", Covert discovers that Sadie's a wizard and plans on exposing her, only to be held captive in the Magical Realm. Principal Covert was inspired by O'Hanlon's secondary school vice-principal, who she describes as "a small woman who was a real power house. I respected her and was terrified of her at the same time".
- Miss Lacey (voiced by Dominique Moore) – Sadie's teacher at school, who teaches a variety of subjects, such as English, History and Drama. She is very optimistic, kind and peaceful. Formerly a student at Harmony High in the 1990s, she's hinted to have travelled across the world.
- Coach Procter – The gym teacher at Harmony High, who is very strict, goofy but quite prideful about sports. Much like Covert, he enjoys taunting and ridiculing his students, pressuring them into completing difficult sports-related tasks. He also has a crush on Miss Lacey, even though she is completely uninterested in him.
- Tammy and Trixie (voiced by Laura Aikman) – Identical twins, cheerleaders and Val's best friends. Supportive of Val through and through, the pair are always delightful and up-beat, yet much like Val, can be sassy and cruel towards Sadie and her friends. Although they have no physical features that tell them apart, the twin with the more raspy, deeper voice is Tammy, and the twin with the more clear, high-pitched voice is Trixie.
- Vincent – One of the three Wardens of Wizardry. He is an elderly and wise man who greatly resembles Albus Dumbledore from the Harry Potter franchise.
- Madge – One of the three Wardens of Wizardry. She is an elderly woman who loves knitting, and is very fond of Sadie, strongly believing in her potential as an amazing wizard. In the episode "Mentor Mayhem, she went under the guise of Purrpetua, a magical cat who is a lazy and unhelpful mentor, to help Sadie and Gilbert re-build their bond.
- Mordecai – One of the three Wardens of Wizardry. He is a large, blue beast who is quite spiteful towards Sadie, and is more supportive of Blaine's wizardry potential.
- Doug – Sam's best friend and a member of the school basketball team. He's a large, muscular, gorilla-like figure, but is very soft inside.
- Melvin Perry (voiced by Dan Renton Skinner) – A socially awkward and shy boy in Sadie's class who is shown to be quite interested in nature and preserving the environment and wildlife.
- Nolan Esquire (voiced by Dan Renton Skinner) – An intelligent yet rude boy in Sadie's class, and often rivals Lulu. He also commentates Harmony High's sporting events. He was previously known as Melvin Melsworth in the episode "The Need for Speed".
- Dex – An African-American boy in Sadie's class. He is Mia's boyfriend and a member of the school basketball team.
- Mia (voiced by Kristina Yee) – An Asian-American nasally-voiced girl in Sadie's class. She supposedly loves music, as she is often seen wearing headphones, and DJs in the episode "Groundhog Date". She is also Dex's girlfriend.
- Jake – Sam's relaxed and determined father who owns Harmony's popular smoothie bar, Juicy Jake's, and wishes for a more united community within the town.
- Agent Whipple (voiced by Laura Aikman) and Agent Pettigrew (referred to as Agent Periwinkle in "Mascot Trouble") – Two agents from the department who grow increasingly bothered of Covert's attempts to make them help her investigation for magical activity in Harmony. In the series finale, they finally believe all of Covert's accusations upon seeing a giant mystical rift between the human world and the Magical Realm.

=== Minor ===
- The Guardian of the Labyrinth – A giant octopus monster who is in charge of the many lost, banned and restricted magical items in the Labyrinth of the Lost and Doomed. He often terrifies people with his loud voice and highly threatening procedures. With Sadie's help, he transforms into the teenage boy Cyril whenever he completely enters the human world.
- Egbert – A cowardly green dragon who lives in Harmony's caves, and is often comforted by his teddy bear, Clarence. In the series finale, he moves back to the Magical Realm.
- Ank – A pharaoh from ancient Egypt brought into the present by Sadie. He is selfish and egotistical, but also wondrous of the modern world.
- Lance Lightning – A fictional superhero whose action figure was brought to life by Sadie. He's very protective of Sadie, but also willing to harm anyone potentially threatening.
- Gah – A baby monster from the Magical Realm who Sadie once took care of. He re-appears in the Funny Ol' Bunny short of the same name.
  - Gah's mother – She is very loving and protective towards her son. She also makes a cameo in the show's opening titles, and Teepee transforms into her appearance in the episode "Magic vs. Aliens".
- Toady – The mascot of Sadie's organization app who goes out of control when magically enhanced to help her plan a party.
- Zaine – Blaine's cousin who is willing to use dark magic to make his father notice him.
- Luke – Sam's toddler brother who Sadie regularly has to babysit and occasionally gets caught up in her magic antics.
- Gary Grimaldo – An ancient wizard who was trapped in a book several years ago because of his unbearable yet hilarious jokes and pranks.
- The Whatevs – An unseen but frequently mentioned girl group that Sadie idolizes.
- Anna Catlova – A Russian professional dancer who Gilbert idolizes, even though she is actually a thief who steals worldwide known prized items.
- Dave – Selina's cameraman.
- Sloane Walker – A famous actor who portrays the twins Jerry and Terry Johnson in "Best Frenemies".
- Mr Dirk Stormweather – Selina's boss at the TV station who often shouts at her through the phone.

== Production ==
When creator Brónagh O'Hanlon entered the animation industry, she wanted to produce cartoons starring more female protagonists. When initially conceptualizing the series, O'Hanlon wondered why rabbits came out of magician's hats, and created a jaded wizard-mentoring rabbit who worked with the likes of Merlin and Rasputin; after a slump in his career, he started working with his complete antithesis: a young energetic teenage girl, who he would slowly, but surely, warm up to. The show was initially pitched in 2009, alongside a currently lost pitch pilot that depicts Sadie and Gilbert's relationship and the art-style changes, but it was never picked up. Executives originally advised O'Hanlon to make the protagonist male, and that the show's target demographic, 11-year-old girls, would only be watching tween sitcoms, but O'Hanlon deduced that girls would only watch sitcoms due to the lack of animated programming targeted towards them. Since the series was shelved, O'Hanlon began working on shows such as Doc McStuffins and Henry Hugglemonster. The idea was revisited in 2013, when a toy manufacturer requested a show from Brown Bag with a synopsis almost identical to O'Hanlon's show, and the series was soon greenlit. The show was originally going to be animated in 2D only, but since most animated shows produced in Ireland at the time were in CGI, it was decided that the human world scenes would be animated in 3D/CGI, while the Magical Realm scenes would be animated in 2D. The test pilot was later re-animated with the current CGI Sadie model to better demonstrate the series to clients, but this second version still has not resurfaced.

When the show was in its early stages of production, it was titled Gilbert and Allie, with Sadie originally being named Allie, however, the name had to be changed to avoid confusion with another Disney Channel show, Austin & Ally.

== Episodes ==
The series has 52 11-minute episodes. When episodes are distributed by Disney, every two episodes are combined into a 22-minute long episode.

No.	Title	Written by	Storyboard by	British and Irish air date	French air date
1a	"Spot On"	Anastasia Heinzl	Marc Sierra	20 April 2019	26 May 2019
Sadie Sparks and her pet rabbit Gilbert are chosen to star in Harmony High's 21st century time capsule video, much to her rival Val's dissatisfaction. However, Sadie wakes up on the day of filming with a giant wart on her nose, and her magical attempts to remove it results in her nose and Gilbert's whiskers disappearing. The two venture to the Labyrinth of the Lost and Doomed to retrieve their missing facial features, going up against the Labyrinth's Guardian in the process. Meanwhile, Sadie's friends, Teepee and Lulu, prevent Val and her pet bulldog Prince from starring in the video instead.
1b	"The Need for Speed"	Rebecca Hobbs	Pierre Lyphoudt	20 April 2019	26 May 2019
Sadie's practicing of the temporary acceleration spell backfire when the spell is accidentally cast on Teepee, landing him a spot on the school's track team despite his lack of athletic fitness. Despite the Wardens of Wizardry - Madge, Mordecai and Vincent - warning her not to use magic for personal gain, Sadie decides to give Teepee a confidence potion disguised as perfume to help his self esteem, but merely ends up inflating his ego.
2a	"Triple Crossed"	Philippe Clerc	Marc Sierra	21 April 2019	26 May 2019
The Wardens of Wizardry task Sadie and her magician rival Blaine with creating the best rainbow-summoning spell individually by night time. Both begin struggling to accomplish this, and Blaine, wanting to gain the upper hand, sends his mentor Cornelius to spy on Sadie's immense progress, despite Gilbert's cautiousness.
2b	"Three's a Crowd"	Rebecca Hobbs	Franck Bonnet	21 April 2019	26 May 2019
Desperate to avoid having to complete a magic essay for the Wardens and her mother Selina's orders to clean her room, Sadie creates two clones of herself to do her chores so she can go to Sam's barbecue party - one clone embodies her clumsiness while the other embodies her excessive confidence. When the clones end up going to the party themselves, she, Gilbert, Teepee and Lulu must try and make them disappear by helping Sadie overcome her flaws.
3a	"Tuff Luck"	Rebecca Hobbs	Fabrice Hagmann	27 April 2019	1 June 2019
Sadie starts to have the worst of luck when Val begins to have the best of luck. She eventually learns that Val has been started wearing a secretly magical bracelet that makes gives her infinite good luck at the price of herself, and soon all of Harmony, suffering endless bad luck, to which the Wardens reveal that it is on a list of forbidden magic items. Sadie attempts to retrieve the bracelet.
3b	"A Walk on the Nile Side"	Fabrice Ziolkowski, Thomas Coste & Charlotte Ballatre	Marc Sierra	27 April 2019	1 June 2019
Ms. Lacey tasks her class with a History presentation on Ancient Egypt. Sadie wants to use magic to prepare, and, despite Gilbert's warnings, discovers a box in his hat, from which the Pharaoh Ankh emerges. Sadie and her friends take him to school, where he and Val become close friends. When Gilbert explains to the gang that bringing Ankh into their timeline causes the present to disappear, they must bring the pharaoh back to Ancient Egypt.
4a	"He's Such a Doll"	Peter Saisselin and Amy Serafin	Mireia Serra	28 April 2019	2 June 2019
Furious that Val has asked her crush Sam out to the school dance before her, Sadie, using her powers, brings her action figure of the superhero Lance Lightning to life as her date, hoping that he and Val will fall in love and she can dance with Sam. At the school dance, however, Lance wants to be with Sadie at all times, and when he transforms into his superhero persona and kidnaps Sam, Sadie must find the button that allows him to switch identities to disenchant him.
4b	"Lunch Potion Number 9"	Jim Nolan	Richard Fabby	28 April 2019	2 June 2019
Wanting to ask Sam out to the see "Perfect Date Movie: The Movie" at the weekend without chickening out, Sadie prepares a love potion to give to him. When Gilbert forbids her from using it, Sadie disposes it, but unfortunately the potion ends up in a pot in the Harmony High cafeteria kitchen, and is cooked into the Taco Tuesday tacos, which the students and faculty eat. They all fall in love with Sadie, who has to eat a disgusting taco given to her by the Wardens - the Groco - to reverse the spell.
5a	"The See-Me-Not Flower"	Léa Lespagnol	Fabrice Hagmann	4 May 2019	8 June 2019
Sadie and Gilbert are tasked by the Wardens to recover the rare See-Me-Not Flower from the Magical Realm that mistakenly blooms in the human world once every three thousand years. Harmony High's principal, Winifred Covert, is also looking for the flower, to show the government's Department agency that magic exists. Determined, Covert organizes a school field trip on a Saturday, in which the students have to look for the flower. Sadie eventually finds the flower and it temporarily turns her invisible, but with this ability, she has to race against time when Covert eventually retrieves it.
5b	"Best Frenemies"	Charlotte Ballastre and Thomas Coste	Jean-Charles Finck	4 May 2019	8 June 2019
Coach Procter fills in for Ms Lacey's class and tasks the students with completing questions from a math book, punishing those who do not complete it on time. Gilbert retrieves Sadie's math book from the school science lab, only to be taunted by Cornelius. When Principal Covert overhears them talking and highly suspects that they're magic, Sadie must team up with Blaine to rescue their mentors from Covert's clutches. In the aftermath, Sadie is punished by Coach Procter for not finishing her work.
6a	"Dance Fever"	Philippe Clerc	Richard Fabby	5 May 2019	15 June 2019
After Sadie and Gilbert bicker over the catchy pop song "Boom Boom, Shake That Tune", an accidentally-produced music potion ends up in Harmony High's drainage and water supply, turning everyone into dancing zombies. The two team up with Blaine and Cornelius to reverse the effects.
6b	"Right on Time"	Léa Lespagnol	Marc Sierra	5 May 2019	15 June 2019
Sadie and Teepee meddle with time to visit a long-awaited concert sooner, despite Lulu's desires for them to work on a class project together. Time soon goes completely out of balance, and with Gilbert's help, they must complete their project and perform a ritual that will bring time back in balance.
7a	"Mascot Trouble"	Anastasia Heinzl	Franck Bonnet	11 May 2019	16 June 2019
Val challenges Sadie to a mascot competition to determine whether Prince or Gilbert will become Harmony High's mascot; Cornelius and Blaine also enter, making the chances of Gilbert winning unlikely. It isn't long before Sadie and Blaine cheat with their magical abilities.
7b	"Glove Story"	Tigran Rosine	Fabrice Hagmann	11 May 2019	16 June 2019
Gilbert briefly teaches Sadie how to use a magic glove that open portal doorways to different places. Convinced by Teepee to have fun with the glove despite Gilbert's warnings of it causing an interdimensional disaster, Sadie causes a misunderstanding that gets Coach Procter fired by Covert. Meanwhile, Lulu teaches Gilbert how to be calm.
8a	"The Double Dare Scare"	Muirinn Lane-Kelly	Jean-Charles Finck	12 May 2019	18 August 2019
When Sadie's class and Coach get lost in the woods late at night after a field trip gone wrong, she and Gilbert are forced to venture into Harmony's caves to prevent Val, Sam and Doug from accidentally stumbling into the Magical Realm. Gilbert meets the cowardly dragon Egbert, and Sadie starts to see a softer side to Val.
8b	"Zen Rabbit"	Thomas Coste	Teddy Saunier	12 May 2019	19 October 2019
Sadie forces Gilbert to spend a day with Lollipop, Mr Stormweather's daughter's pet rabbit, while she sneaks off to the movies. Gilbert is unable to study for a meeting with the Wardens as Lollipop makes his time a nightmare, and Sadie's brother Max enforces blackmailing techniques on his sister.
9a	"Mentor Mayhem"	Marie Beardmore	Marc Sierra	6 July 2019	3 September 2019
Sadie and Gilbert begin to become sick of each other's company, so the Wardens send the mysterious cat Purrpetua to replace Gilbert as Sadie's mentor. The duo soon learn that they value each other immensely upon discovering Purrpetua's mysterious past and horrible mentoring.
9b	"Creature Care"	Rebecca Hobbs	Gaston Jaunet	6 July 2019	3 September 2019
While closing a magical rift and also doing a class assignment in which she must look after a baby watermelon, Sadie temporarily nurtures a baby monster, whom she names Gah. When she brings Gah to school, he gains an appetite for the Sadie's class' watermelons, causing much chaos and terror.
10a	"Super Teepee"	Phillippe Clerc	Fabrice Hagmann	7 July 2019	4 September 2019
Teepee pretends to be a superhero to prevent everyone at school from figuring out that Sadie's a wizard, and continues this facade with an irritated Sadie's aid. Val and Covert becomes highly suspicious of Teepee's act and wish to expose him.
10b	"A Nose for Trouble"	Christopher Panzner and Joan Teffit	Fabrice Hagmann	7 July 2019	4 September 2019
The Wardens force Sadie and Blaine to temporarily switch Gilbert and Cornelius as mentors after the pair of rivals express their unappreciation for them. This leads to Blaine spitefully casting a spell on Gilbert that makes him smell everywhere he goes, impacting the school basketball team.
11a	"Magic vs. Aliens"	Denise Cassar	Chtistian Ragoust	13 July 2019	5 September 2019
Warden Vincent's sauna falls into the human world through one of the many rifts between it and the Magical Realm, intriguing Sadie to turn Teepee into an alien monster as a cover-up, which dangerously attracts the attention of Covert.
11b	"Max Profit"	Jim Nolan	Mireia Serra	13 July 2019	5 September 2019
Max, realizing that none of his inventions work, sets to start a hot chocolate stand at one of the school basketball team's games. Learning that Max's hot chocolate taste horrendous, Gilbert gives Sadie a spell that makes it taste outstandingly delicious. Max soon creates a major local hot chocolate business, but Sadie is exhausted from doing so many spells to make the drink good.
12a	"Party On!"	Léa Lespagnol	Pierre Lyphoundt	14 July 2019	6 September 2019
Sadie's organization app mascot, Toady, goes rogue after she casts a spell on her to help her plan a party. Meanwhile, Gilbert becomes obsessed with an old video game console of his.
12b	"The Secret Curse"	Henry Gifford	Christian Ragoust & Teddy Saunier	14 July 2019	6 September 2019
Dark magic is afoot in Harmony High when a mysterious being begins turning people completely still.
13a	"The Bane of Blaine"	Arturo Valencia	Brayan Adeel	20 July 2019	9 June 2019
Blaine's cousin Zaine visits to become Blaine's new mentor, and Sadie immediately becomes suspicious of his evil intentions and the bad influence he's having on Blaine. She soon learns of the real reason why Zaine is here - to gain the powerful and evil Lodar Stone, which he can use to take over the Magical Realm and force his father to value him.
13b	"Mama Memory!"	Léa Lespagnol	Franck Bonnet	20 July 2019	9 June 2019
To make her mother forget about a massive orange juice mess she made in kitchen after a potion-producing malfunction so she won't report it to Miss Lacey on parents-teacher night, Sadie casts a forgetful spell on Selina, who ends up forgetting who Sadie is completely.
14a	"Go Bunny Go"	Charlotte Ballatre and Thomas Coste	Mireia Sierra	21 July 2019	9 September 2019
Gilbert, crestfallen that nobody takes him seriously as the school mascot and simply think of him as good luck charm, disappears into the Magical Realm, causing the school basketball team to lose their focus.
14b	"The Mysterious Avenger"	Philippe Clerc	Marc Sierra	21 July 2019	9 September 2019
When Val, Coach, Nolan, Tammy and Trixie humiliate Teepee for failing 'gymathon', a mysterious avenger begins to cause mischief around them.
15a	"Cheeky Monkey"	Franck Salomé, Nicolas Sedel and Fernando Worcel	Romain Sordet	27 July 2019	10 September 2019
Sadie casts the cheeky monkey spell on Selina to bring back her sense of fun for her job, only to make her behave like an uncontrollable monkey raging throughout Harmony.
15b	"Sleeping City"	Anastasia Heinzl	Richard Fabby	27 July 2019	10 September 2019
On the day of Bernie the Bear's awakening, Sadie and friends become immensely irritated when babysitting Sam's deafening baby brother Luke, and Sadie accidentally casts a sleeping spell on all of Harmony.
16a	"Advanced Pranking"	Vincent Souchon	Fabrice Hagmann & Teddy Saunier	28 July 2019	11 September 2019
Sadie steals Grimaldo's Book of Advanced Magic from Gilbert's library so she and Blaine can learn more advanced spells, only for the book to come to life and give them pain for comedic amusement.
16b	"The Doomed Watch"	Muirinn Lane-Kelly	Jean-Charles Finck	28 July 2019	11 September 2019
When Teepee loses his grandfather's watch, Sadie gives him another one from the Labyrinth of the Lost and Doomed, which has the power to freeze time. Trouble arises when the Guardian of the Labyrinth will stop at nothing to get it back.
17a	"Diva Sadie"	Denise Cassar	Mireia Serra	25 November 2019	22 June 2019
Blaine curses Sadie to act like an incredibly unpleasant diva on the day of the school talent show. Gilbert, Lulu and Teepee must prevent Sadie from going on a world tour with the Whatevs all while keeping her calm.
17b	"Lulu's Shoes"	Tigran Rosine	Mireia Sierra	25 November 2019	22 June 2019
World-renowned dancer Anna Catlova visits Sadie's school to help the students with their individual dance choreographies, but unfortunately, Lulu can't dance. Gilbert and Sadie use magic to convert the dancing talent from one of Anna's shoelaces into Lulu's shoes, only to start suspecting that Anna could be a master thief.
18a	"Best Friends Forever"	Franck Salomé, Nicolas Sedel and Fernando Worcel	Arnold Gransac	26 November 2019	12 September 2019
Desperate to star in a music video with Val, Tammy and Trixie to meet the Whatevs, Sadie casts a 'best friends forever' spell on Val. Val becomes overly possessive and obsessed with Sadie, damaging her friendship with Lulu and soon endangers Gilbert.
18b	"Monster Exchange"	Philippe Clerc	Pierre Lyphoundt	26 November 2019	12 September 2019
The Guardian of the Labyrinth, growing tired of his endless job, is invited by Sadie to take a day-off in the human realm. Disguised as Sadie's 'cousin' Cyril, he begins causing an unpleasant time at Juicy Jake's.
19a	"Living the Dream"	Annabelle Perrichon	Mireia Serra	27 November 2019	13 September 2019
Both Sadie and Gilbert mistakenly set loose a small magical flea, who starts turning anyone in Harmony's dreams into a reality.
19b	"Light at Heart"	Lèa Lespagnol	Sophie Moulin	27 November 2019	13 September 2019
Lulu becomes increasingly depressed over failing a science exam, so Sadie casts a spell on her to make her feel 'light at heart', only for gravitational problems to arise around her.
20a	"It's Showtime"	Thomas Coste	Kévin Enhardt	28 November 2019	16 September 2019
To help Selina gain an interview with the actor Sloane Walker, Sadie brings the character he plays in Gilbert's favorite TV show, "Best Frenemies", Jerry, to life. Absent: Lulu and Teepee
20b	"Cupcake Chaos"	Robert Vargas	Mireia Serra	28 November 2019	16 September 2019
When Sadie and friends set loose evil cupcakes in Harmony High, they decide to fight sweetness with sweetness.
21a	"Truth Bubbles"	Oliver Serrano	Marc Sierra	29 November 2019	17 September 2019
Sadie casts a spell through the TV to force to her news-reporting mother to reveal where they're going on vacation. However, everyone who was watching TV when the spell was cast begins to tell the truth, and only the truth.
21b	"Detention Games"	Annabelle Perrinchop	Olivier Dutranoy	29 November 2019	17 September 2019
The students and faculty of Harmony High compete against each other in a scavenger hunt to find the Golden Smoothie.
22a	"Heat Stroke"	Theresa Rippel and Léa Lespagnol	Marc Sierra	30 November 2019	18 September 2019
Upon learning that the recent horrendous weather in Harmony could force Sam and Jake to close their smoothie business and leave town, Sadie uses magic to bring only hot weather that soon enough becomes insufferable.
22b	"A Tale of Two Sadies"	Tigran Rosine	Ashton Gransac & Teddy Saunier	30 November 2019	18 September 2019
Gilbert causes Sadie to catch a cold due to a magical mishap, putting Sadie's student president campaign at risk. Gilbert, disguised as Sadie, goes in her place, and starts acting unsympathetic, determined to win at any cost.
23a	"Poetry in Motion"	Thomas Coste	Oliver Dutranoy	1 December 2019	19 September 2019
When Sadie mixes up a spell with one of her poems, she causes her entire class to disappear into thin air. She, Lulu and Gilbert must retrieve the spell from Covert and bring the class back.
23b	"Oh Grow Up!"	Franck Salomé, Nicolas Sedel & Fernando Worcel	Marc Sierra	1 December 2019	19 September 2019
When the Wardens task Sadie and Blaine with creating a spell that has never been cast before, a mischievous Blaine casts an immaturity spell on Gilbert to slow down his and Sadie's progress.
24a	"Groundhog Date"	Jim Nolan	Pierre Lyphoundt	2 December 2019	20 September 2019
A despaired Sadie believes Sam has started dating Val after ignoring him so much on their first date. She and Gilbert use the Time Turner to repeat the day again and again to make the perfect date happen.
24b	"Melvin Rules"	Franck Salomé, Nicolas Sedel and Fernando Worcel	Pierre Lyphoundt & Sophie Moulin	2 December 2019	20 September 2019
Sadie casts a leadership spell on the shy Melvin to help him guide Harmony High into an environmentally friendly future.
25a	"Smarten Up"	Léa Lespagnol	Romain Sordet	3 December 2019	23 September 2019
Max finds the rare Magnafloritestone on the beach, and starts gaining immense amounts of knowledge at the price of everyone around him losing their intelligence. When Sadie gets the blame, she has to clear her name.
25b	"Magic Mojo"	Philippe Clerc	Mireia Serra	3 December 2019	23 September 2019
Gilbert berates Sadie after getting injured in a wizard training session, causing Sadie to fear using and lose her magical abilities.
26a	"Hanging in There"	Tigran Rosine	Olivier Dutranoy	4 December 2019	24 September 2019
On the day of her second date with Sam, Sadie's magical powers begin to become overpowered and spiral out of control. Meanwhile, a giant rift between the human world and the Magical Realm begins to grow in Harmony.
26b	"Oh-My-Giddy!"	Brónagh O'Hanlon, Charlie Kennedy and Rebecca Hobbs	Fabrice Hagmann & Romain Sordet	4 December 2019	24 September 2019
Continuing directly from the events of "Hanging in There", Sadie and friends team up with Blaine, Cornelius and Egbert to close the giant rift in Harmony before it's too late.

== Shorts ==
Two series of shorts were also created and released alongside the show in 2019; one simply title Sadie Sparks Shorts, which exclusively uses the 3D segments of the series with original voice-over, and a second titled Sadie Sparks: Funny Ol' Bunny, which features original 2D animated content. Disney Channel UK uploaded the first two Sadie Sparks Shorts to their YouTube channel. Although the English versions of most of the shorts were missing for some time, both of these short series were released on Disney+ in the UK on September 15, 2021.

=== Sadie Sparks Shorts (2019) ===
No.	Title	British and Irish air date (Disney+)	French air date (YouTube)
1	"Meet Sadie"	15 September 2021	28 August 2019
Teenager Sadie Sparks reveals her life isn't as average as it seems: she's secretly a wizard in training!
2	"Meet Gilbert"	15 September 2021	28 August 2019
Gilbert is a 700-year-old magical rabbit who has trained the great wizard Merlin... but is now stuck with training the incompetent Sadie Sparks.
3	"Rival Wizard"	15 September 2021	28 August 2019
Sadie talks about how she and Gilbert cope with their wizardry rivals, Blaine and Cornelius.
4	"Healthy Lifestyle"	15 September 2021	28 August 2019
Sadie shares all the ways she maintains a healthy lifestyle - wizard-style!
5	"Wizarding Woes"	15 September 2021	28 August 2019
Sadie finds it great that she's a wizard, but nothing is without its disadvantages.
6	"Grumpy Gilbert"	15 September 2021	28 August 2019
Despite Sadie finding Gilbert to be a frustrating wizard mentor to work with, she knows they'll always love each other deep down.

=== Funny Ol' Bunny (2019) ===
No.	Title	British and Irish air date (Disney+)	French air date (YouTube)
1	"Boom Boom"	15 September 2021	16 October 2019
While cleaning his apartment, Gilbert can't help but dance to Boom Boom, Shake That Tune.
2	"Voice"	15 September 2021	16 October 2019
With Gilbert's guidance, Sadie tries to perfect casting the voice spell.
3	"Fly"	15 September 2021	20 October 2019
Gilbert wants to watch Best Frenemies in peace, but an annoying fly gives him a hard time.
4	"Glue"	15 September 2021	20 October 2019
Gilbert and Sadie end up in numerous sticky situations when creating more magic glue.
5	"Dance"	15 September 2021	23 October 2019
Sadie accidentally casts the dance spell on Gilbert, who starts dancing to countless genres of music.
6	"Yoga Bunny"	15 September 2021	23 October 2019
Sadie cheekily uses her magic to meddle with Gilbert's meditating.
7	"Gah"	15 September 2021	23 October 2019
Gilbert stressfully babysits Gah.

== Broadcast ==
Sadie Sparks premiered on Disney Channel in the UK and Ireland on 20 April 2019, however the first two episodes were released earlier on YouTube on 9 April. In France, the series premiered on Disney Channel on 26 May. In Latin America and Brazil, the series premiered on Discovery Kids on 20 July 2019. In South Africa, the show premiered on 3 August 2019. In Australia, the series airs on ABC Me.

In Canada, the show premiered on Family Channel on 6 January 2020. In Spain and Portugal, the series premiered on 13 January 2020 on Disney Channel within those territories. The series also aired on POP TV from the 27 July 2020. On 1 August 2020, the series premiered on Disney Channel in Bulgaria, the Czech Republic, Hungary, Poland and Romania. In Ireland, the series premiered on TG4 with Irish-language dubbing on 2 October 2020. In Turkey, the series premiered on 2 November 2020 on Disney Channel, where it has grown a large fanbase.

In 2021, the series premiered in Finland on Yle Areena on 26 March, on Disney+ throughout western Europe on 14 May, and in Japan on Disney Channel on 4 September. On 18 September 2021, the series premiered on Pixel TV in Ukraine. On 23 September 2021, the series premiered in the United States on the Kidoodle TV app. As of 31 October 2021, the series also airs on Yle TV2 as part of the "Galaxi" programming block for children ages 7 and up.

In 2022, the series premiered on Super3 with Catalan-language dubbing on 10 January. It was made available on Disney+ in South Africa on the 18th of May.

In 2025, the series premiered on VTV with Indonesian-language dubbing on 16 June.
