= Disney Channel (Central and Eastern Europe) =

European version of the Disney Channel

- Logo debuted since 1 September 2022
- Country: United Kingdom
- Broadcast area: Czech Republic; Hungary; Slovakia; Bulgaria; Moldova; Romania
- Headquarters: 3 Queen Caroline Street, Hammersmith, London W6 9PE, United Kingdom

Programming
- Languages: English; Bulgarian; Czech; Hungarian; Romanian; Russian (1999-2009, 2010–2013); Ukrainian (2010-2013)
- Picture format: HDTV 1080i (selected feeds); SDTV 576i (16:9)

Ownership
- Owner: The Walt Disney Company Limited (Disney Entertainment)
- Sister channels: Disney Jr.

History
- Launched: April 1999 (as Fox Kids); 1 January 2005 (as Jetix); 19 September 2009 (as Disney Channel)
- Former names: Fox Kids (1999–2005); Jetix (2005–2009)

Links
- Website: tv.disney.cz; tv.disney.sk; tv.disney.hu; tv.disney.ro; tv.disney.bg

Disney Channel is a European children's television channel owned by The Walt Disney Company Limited, the international business division of the Walt Disney Company and broadcast in the Czech Republic, Slovakia, Hungary, Romania, Moldova, and Bulgaria. It was previously known as Fox Kids, then Jetix. There are several variations of the channel which broadcast simultaneously in six languages (using DVB audio technology): Romanian, English, Bulgarian, Czech, and Hungarian. Advertising is shown in Romanian, Bulgarian, Hungarian, and Czech.

== History ==
- April, 1999 – Fox Kids launches in Romania, Moldova, Russia, Turkey, Bulgaria.
- November 2000 – Fox Kids launches in Hungary.
- February 2001 – Fox Kids Hungarian feed was expanded to the Czech Republic and Slovakia.
- January 2004 – Fox Kids Turkey leaves Eastern European feed, and joins EMEA feed.
- January 1, 2005 – Fox Kids is rebranded as Jetix.
- October 1, 2007 – A Bulgarian audio track was introduced.

On August 11, 2008, Jetix started broadcasting a block of "Disney Stars" in Romania and Bulgaria, featuring the series Kim Possible, Phineas and Ferb, American Dragon and Hannah Montana. High School Musical aired on August 22, 2008, and High School Musical 2 aired on November 1, 2008. It was fully dubbed into Romanian, and an early Bulgarian translation of Kim Possible (once aired on BNT Channel 1) was made available on October 20, 2008. High School Musical 2 was also dubbed. Subsequently, Phineas and Ferb and American Dragon were also dubbed by Media Link using voice-over dubbing (unlike all pre-2005 Disney cartoon series, which were all dubbed with synchronized voices). This way of dubbing is very common in Bulgarian television, because it costs less and takes less time to produce (as the voices of actors are just placed directly over a quieted original voice track). Usually, only theatrically or home video-released animated films are dubbed with synchronized voices, and in the 1990s only Disney's animated series were dubbed this way for television. Only starting in 2008, Disney allowed Bulgarian broadcasters to dub films themselves, and all of them were using voice-over dubbing.

After Disney XD successfully launched on February 13, 2009, in the US, it was supposed to be rolled out to CEE territories (except Poland and Netherlands) in 2009. Later, however, Disney announced that the Jetix channel in certain countries (Hungary, Romania, Czech Republic, Slovakia, Russia, Bulgaria and Israel) will be renamed to Disney Channel, marking that channel's first introduction in these countries. The change took place on September 19, 2009, in the CEE region. Disney Channel Romania & Bulgaria are broadcast as a single video feed with two audio channels and there is also a Russian audio channel.

On September 19, 2009, Disney Channel replaced Jetix in Bulgaria, Czech Republic, Hungary, Moldova, Romania and Slovakia. But the Russian feed was still broadcasting under the Jetix name until it was announced that a separate Disney Channel would launch. After the launch of Disney Channel Romania and Disney Channel Bulgaria, the Jetix feed in Russia began to be independent and got localized, with Russian title cards and banners with Russian hours.

On August 10, 2010, Disney Channel replaced Jetix in Russia.

On October 15, 2010, Disney Channel CEE launched a Ukrainian and Russian audio for audience in Ukraine, which was deleted on 2 January 2013 for unknown reasons.

== Feeds ==
- Disney Channel Eastern Europe, available in Romania, Moldova and Bulgaria with three audio tracks in Romanian, Bulgarian and English.
- Disney Channel Central Europe, available in the Czech Republic, Slovakia, and Hungary, with three audio tracks in Czech, Hungarian, and English.

Disney Channel Eastern Europe, on its commercial break ident, it shows just the Romanian word for "commercials": RECLAME, without the Bulgarian word, unlike on Jetix, where it showed first "RECLAME", then "РЕКЛАМА". Since 2022, it now shows the word "РЕКЛАМА" only on the Bulgarian sub-feed for commercials.

== Availability ==
Disney Channel Eastern Europe is broadcast in Romania by all pay television providers. The network is also included in the list of channels of various Moldovan cable operators. Meanwhile, Disney Channel EMEA is included in the basic package of the digital platform Digi TV in Serbia.

Fox Kids, then Jetix, and now Disney Channel have been available in all cable operators in Bulgaria since around 1999 and were mostly broadcast with either the Russian, Romanian, Turkish or English language audio track. In October 2007, a Bulgarian audio track was added to for some of the shows on Jetix. Jetix was previously shown in Bulgaria on bTV, which continued to air a Jetix block even after Fox Kids was sold to Disney. Translation and distribution for the channel's Bulgarian version was handled by Media Link. It was expected that the channel would reach 100% translation of its shows in 2008. However, this was achieved only in early 2009, with many shows being withheld from broadcast after February 2009 until translation of their episodes was completed. In May and June, many such programs were returned to the channel, since translation had advanced a lot. Hannah Montana was the only untranslated show, but it was available in Bulgarian on BNT 1 since March 28, 2009. Promos aired in English and not in Bulgarian.

Jetix in Russia was based on this channel, but all things related to Disney were automatically replaced with Jetix promos. Certain shows which then did not air on the regular Jetix CEE (W.I.T.C.H., Iggy Arbuckle) were part of the hour-and-a-half long programming block that replaced the Disney block. When Jetix CEE was changed to Disney Channel, the Russian-language broadcast was continued until 10 August 2010. After 10 August 2010 Russian-language broadcast was renamed by Ukrainian-language broadcast, and on 15 October 2010 was officially started with Ukrainian promos, but shows was mixed in English, Russian and Ukrainian. On 2 January 2013 Ukrainian-language broadcast was ceased with unknown reasons.

== Disney Junior ==
Playhouse Disney was launched the same day as Disney Channel as a block. In 2010, Playhouse Disney was launched as a channel, replacing Jetix Play. In June 2011, Playhouse Disney was replaced by Disney Junior.

=== Programming ===
- Handy Manny
- Jake and the Never Land Pirates
- Jungle Junction
- Lalaloopsy
- Little Einsteins
- Mickey Mouse Clubhouse
- My Friends Tigger & Pooh
- Special Agent Oso

== See also ==
- Jetix
- Jetix Play
- Disney XD
- Disney Channel Bulgaria
- Disney Channel Romania
- Disney Channel Hungary
