= Wesley Morgan (actor) =

Canadian actor and model (born 1990)

- Born: Wesley Francis Morgan; October 5, 1990; Mississauga, Ontario, Canada
- Occupations: Actor, model
- Years active: 2007–2015

Wesley Francis Morgan (born October 5, 1990) is a Canadian actor and model, whose roles have included Skander Hill on Harriet the Spy: Blog Wars, the recurring role of Sam on Degrassi: The Next Generation and Prom King Josh in The Rocker. He played Brody Cooper on the show Really Me.

Morgan was born in Canada. He played Sam in Degrassi: The Next Generation's ninth season two-part episode "Beat It". He played Skander Hill in the Disney Channel Original Movie Harriet the Spy: Blog Wars, with Jennifer Stone and Melinda Shankar, and Brody Cooper in Disney channel's Really Me.

== Filmography ==
Film and television
Year	Title	Role	Notes
2007	Overruled!	Matt	TV series
2008	Paradise Falls	Ethan Banning	TV series, season 3
2008	The Rocker	Prom King Josh	
2009–10	Majority Rules!	Jack Braddock	TV series, 17 episodes
2009	Degrassi: The Next Generation	Sam	TV series, episode: "Beat It" (parts 1 and 2)
2010	Harriet the Spy: Blog Wars	Skander Hill	TV movie
2010	Falling Skies	Simms	TV series, episode: "The Armoury"
2010	Score: A Hockey Musical	Sensitive Player	
2010	Unnatural History	Hunter O'Hurlary	TV series, recurring role
2011–13	Really Me	Brody	TV series, recurring role
2013	Kick-Ass 2	Simon	Minor Role
2013	Pete's Christmas	Jake Kidder	TV movie
2013	Skating to New York	Rudy Bouchard	
2015–16	Between	Kevin	TV series, recurring role
