= The ZhuZhus =

Animated TV series

- Also known as: Polly and the ZhuZhu Pets
- Genre: Adventure; Comedy
- Based on: ZhuZhu Pets by Russ Hornsby
- Developed by: Hugh Duffy
- Directed by: Mike Fallows
- Voices of: Jenna Warren; Richard Binsley; Robert Tinkler; Stephany Seki; Tajja Isen
- Theme music composer: Jesse Colburn; Aaron Verdonk; Chiara Young
- Composer: Scott Bucsis
- Countries of origin: Canada; United States
- Original language: English
- No. of seasons: 1
- No. of episodes: 26 (50 segments)

Production
- Executive producers: Colin Bohm; Scott Dyer; Irene Weibel; James Hornsby
- Producers: Laurie Handforth; Kristen Hudecki
- Running time: 22 minutes
- Production companies: Cepia LLC; Nelvana

Original release
- Network: Disney Channel (United States); YTV (Canada)
- Release: September 12, 2016 – August 24, 2017

The ZhuZhus (formerly known as Polly and the ZhuZhu Pets) is an animated children's television series developed by Hugh Duffy for Disney Channel and YTV. The series is based on the American toy franchise ZhuZhu Pets. It is the second animated adaptation starring the Fab Four; Pipsqueak, Mr. Squiggles, Num Nums, and Chunk, following Quest for Zhu in 2011.

The series is about Frankie Pamplemousse, a young girl who owns four talking hamsters. It debuted on Disney Channel in the United States on September 12, 2016.

== Plot ==
The ZhuZhus is about 8-year-old Frankie Pamplemousse, who lives in Anytown with her parents who run a plumbing home business called Pamplemouse Plumbing. She owns four talking hamsters called the ZhuZhus; Pipsqueak, Mr. Squiggles, Num Nums, and Chunk, as they have adventures in their town.

== Characters ==
=== Main ===
- Frankie Pamplemousse (voiced by Jenna Warren) is the 8-year-old owner of the ZhuZhus. She likes sports and hanging out with her friends, the ZhuZhus. She has blonde hair and blue eyes.
- Pipsqueak (voiced by Tajja Isen) is Frankie's first ZhuZhu, and the unofficial leader of the ZhuZhus. She loves adventure, and will do anything to help Frankie and the team out. She is fearless, energetic, and very loyal to Frankie. She is yellow and her birthmark, which are located on the Zhus' backs, is a shooting star because she always fires ideas and enthusiasm in every way.
- Mr. Squiggles (voiced by Richard Binsley) is Frankie's second ZhuZhu. He is very smart, resourceful, and likes science. He also creates machines and gadgets that help the team out when in need. He is orange, has wrinkles under his eyes, wears a belt, and his birthmark is a spiral because his mind always spins with new ideas.
- Num Nums (voiced by Stephany Seki) is Frankie's third ZhuZhu, and Pipsqueak's best friend. She is a very shy and a cautious thinker, and isn't as daring as the rest of the team, but she will do anything to help them. Despite this however, she still has a tough side whenever she or the team is insulted. She is purple, wears pink glasses, and her birthmark is a heart because she always wears it on her sleeve.
- Chunk (voiced by Robert Tinkler) is Frankie's fourth ZhuZhu, and the tallest Zhu. As his name suggests, he is very chunky and strong. He is also very stylish and narcissistic, and usually serves as the comic relief. His cousins are Jilly and Bean, two mischievous twins. He is grey and his birthmark is a sun because he lights up the whole room whenever he smiles.

=== Recurring ===
- Ellen Pamplemousse or "Mom" (voiced by Stacey DePass) is Frankie's mother and a professional plumber for Pamplemousse Plumbing. She used to be a part of the Power Badge Girls.
- Stanley Pamplemousse or "Dad" (voiced by Zachary Bennett) is Frankie's father and also a professional plumber for Pamplemousse Plumbing. He loves music and was previously a Wilderness Teen Ranger. Thus, he knows a lot about nature.
- Wilfred P. Kerdle or Mr. Kerdle (voiced by Patrick McKenna) is the cranky janitor of Frankie's school. He tries to stop the Zhus from coming into the school and insults them.
- Cindy and Mindy Gelato (voiced by Rebecca Brenner and Samantha Weinstein) are twins and Frankie's friends.
- Madge Mervins (voiced by Brianna D'Aguanno) is Frankie's neighbor and worst enemy. She always tries to beat Frankie at everything. She has blue hair and brown eyes and a cat named Princess Tickyboo.
- Whendy Sails (voiced by Nicole Stamp) is a celebrity and news reporter for Channel 5.
- Jessica Beeker (voiced by Addison Holley) is Frankie's favorite popstar.
- Dr. Phelmholz (voiced by Rob Rubin) is an Austrian doctor from Vienna.

== Production ==
The ZhuZhus is produced by Cepia LLC in association with Nelvana. The series is animated at Toon Boom Animation and recorded at Studio 306 Inc. It was first announced on February 12, 2015, by Kristin Musulin of USA Today as a Nelvana production, with a planned release of 2016. The show was originally referred to as "ZhuZhu Pets" before the official title was revealed. The last episode to air on Disney Channel with that title was "Fur-Vivor/Zhuper Girl", which premiered on October 21, 2016, and the show went on a hiatus. After its hiatus the series gained a new name and Polly's name was changed to Frankie for the rest of the series' run. Eventually all seven episodes that were previously broadcast on Disney Channel were redubbed to say Frankie instead of Polly.

== Episodes ==
No.	Title	Written by	Storyboard by	Original release date	Canadian air date	U.S. viewers (millions)
1	"Happy Bounciversary"	Laurie Elliott	Greg Collinson	September 12, 2016 (Note: This episode was released early on iTunes.)	July 4, 2017	0.62
1	"Say It Don't Spray It"	Laurie Elliott	John Flagg	September 12, 2016	July 4, 2017	0.62
Upset that she missed her parents' wedding, Frankie and the Zhus try to make her parents' anniversary a blast by planning their own, but they get stuck in a floating bouncy castle. The Zhus get stuck in the wild after a skunk shows up in their house.
2	"Home Run Hamsters"	Hugh Duffy	Steve Remen	September 13, 2016	July 5, 2017	N/A
2	"Chip off the Old Chunk"	Miles Smith	Andrew Tan	September 13, 2016	July 5, 2017	N/A
After Frankie's baseball glove is accidentally left at home, the Zhus try to return it back to her before her big game starts. Ellen tells the Zhus that they can't go to the grocery store, but they break the rule after Chunk eats all of the chocolate chips.
3	"Walter-Gate"	Shawn Kalb	Bradley Overall	September 14, 2016	July 6, 2017	0.63
3	"Janitor Day"	Terry McGurrin	Steve Remen	September 14, 2016	July 6, 2017	0.63
While getting her dog Walter a snack, Frankie asks the Zhus to dog-sit him. But they accidentally let Walter out the backyard. The Zhus try to make friends with Mr. Kerdle, while Frankie tries to stop them from getting in trouble.
4	"Goldfish Fingers"	Richard Clark	John Flagg	September 15, 2016	July 7, 2017	N/A
4	"Skate-lebrity"	Richard Clark	Andrew Tan	September 15, 2016	July 7, 2017	N/A
Frankie is told she can't plumb with her parents on a level 5 job for professionals only. When the Zhus give Frankie something to do, a pipe snaps and the entire house floods. Frankie is offered a deal to appear on television to show off her skateboarding skills, but Chunk gets carried away when giving her a makeover.
5	"Zombie Sleep Over"	Miles Smith	Bradley Overall	September 16, 2016	July 10, 2017	0.54
5	"Little Stop"	Scott Albert	Steve Remen	September 16, 2016	July 10, 2017	0.54
Frankie and the Zhus think that the Gelato twins have turned into zombies after watching a zombie film during a sleepover. Frankie is sick and can't go to the Go-Kart race, so the Zhus try to help her get better in time.
6	"Storming the Cat Castle"	Scott Albert	John Flagg	October 7, 2016	July 11, 2017	0.73
6	"Ha Ha Hamsters"	Richard Clark	Andrew Tan	October 7, 2016	July 11, 2017	0.73
Num Nums gets taken by Madge's cat, so the Zhus try to rescue her while Frankie distracts Madge. Frankie and the Zhus try to get on a TV show called World's Funniest Pets.
7	"Fur-Vivor"	Andrew Harrison	Bradley Overall	October 21, 2016	July 12, 2017	0.59
7	"Zhuper Girl"	Miles Smith	John Flagg	October 21, 2016	July 12, 2017	0.59
A rainy day prevents the Zhus from doing the Iron Hamster Games, until Frankie decides to do it inside. Frankie and the Zhus pretend to be superheroes, but Mr. Squiggles takes his role as the villain too seriously.
8	"Wingin' It"	Laurie Elliott	Steve Remen	February 11, 2017 (Note: This episode was released on the Watch Disney Channel app on January 15, 2017.)	July 13, 2017	1.23
8	"Friendship Friend-zy"	Scott Albert	John Flagg	February 11, 2017	July 13, 2017	1.23
Frankie and the Zhus take care of a baby bird and teach it to fly. When Frankie gets two friendship bracelets from her aunt Zia, the Zhus compete to see who is Frankie's best friend.
9	"Dreams O'Clock"	Andrew Harrison	Steve Remen	January 21, 2017	July 14, 2017	1.16
9	"Badge to the Bone"	Evany Rosen	Bradley Overall	January 21, 2017	July 14, 2017	1.16
Frankie's parents get an emergency plumbing call from Frankie's favorite popstar Jessica Beeker. They take Frankie and the Zhus with them to meet Jessica, but Frankie becomes nervous. Frankie and the Zhus try to help Ellen get her last Power Badge Girls badge, the camping badge, when they learn she's afraid of the dark.
10	"Full Groan"	Evany Rosen	Bradley Overall	January 22, 2017	July 17, 2017	1.10
10	"The Shell Game"	Laurie Elliott	Andrew Tan	January 22, 2017	July 17, 2017	1.10
The Zhus help Frankie decide what she wants to be when she grows up for a school project. When Frankie breaks her fourth skateboard, her parents cut a deal that she can get another if she goes a week without breaking an egg.
11	"If Wishes Were Rainbows"	Miles Smith	Steve Remen	January 28, 2017	July 18, 2017	1.08
11	"Deja Zhu"	Terry McGurrin	John Flagg	January 28, 2017	July 18, 2017	1.08
Chunk accidentally uses Frankie's present for Ellen as a letter for the Rainbow Roo. The lamp is broken and Frankie and the Zhus each tell Ellen their stories of what happened.
12	"A Total Bust a Move"	Andrew Harrison	Steve Remen	January 29, 2017	July 19, 2017	1.06
12	"The Grand ZhuZhu Pets Hotel"	Andrew Harrison	Bradley Overall	January 29, 2017	July 19, 2017	1.06
The Zhus try to stop Frankie from dancing in the school talent show after seeing her moves. Frankie gives the Zhus their first vacation experience by running a hotel in the backyard.
13	"Zhu Years Eve"	Andrew Harrison	Andrew Tan	January 7, 2017	July 20, 2017	1.12
13	"Lookies for Cookies"	Alex Ganetakos	John Flagg	January 7, 2017	July 20, 2017	1.12
Frankie and the Zhus stay up for the New Years without sleeping. Frankie's desires for another treasure hunt are ruined, so Mr. Squiggles hides a cookie jar which has Frankie's parents' tickets in it. But he forgets where he hid it.
14	"The Pumpkin Whisperers"	Richard Clark	Steve Remen	February 4, 2017	July 21, 2017	1.07
14	"Zhuper Zhide Kicks"	Miles Smith	Andrew Tan	February 4, 2017	July 21, 2017	1.07
Frankie signs up for the annual Biggest Pumpkin Growing contest and competes with Madge. Frankie plays Zhuper Girl again, and the Zhus try to show who is sidekick worthy.
15	"The Wrong Stuff"	Richard Clark	John Flagg	February 5, 2017	July 24, 2017	1.13
15	"Chunklette's Web"	Alex Ganetakos	Bradley Overall	February 5, 2017	July 24, 2017	1.13
Mr. Squiggles tests the new Hamster Cannon 3000 by blasting Chunk into the sky. When he comes back, he is mistaken for an alien. Chunk develops a fear of spiders after getting tangled in a spider web.
16	"Story Book It"	Andrew Harrison	Steve Remen	June 17, 2017	July 25, 2017	0.75
16	"Hairible Mistake"	Craig Brown	Andrew Tan	June 17, 2017	July 25, 2017	0.75
Frankie wants to be an author. So she tries to write a book, but she develops writer's block. The Zhus help her write the book by living the experience in real life. Frankie gets a new haircut, which is the same as Ellen's. She doesn't like it, so the Zhus try to make it better, but instead it makes it worse.
17	"Weathering Heights"	Laurie Elliott	Steve Remen	June 24, 2017 (Note: This episode aired on Disney Channel in Poland on June 20, 2017.)	July 26, 2017	0.83
17	"The Trashing of Zhuper Girl"	Miles Smith	John Flagg	June 24, 2017	July 26, 2017	0.83
Frankie and the Zhus create their own emergency kit to prepare for a thunderstorm. Frankie and the Zhus play Zhuper Girl again to help the park throw out garbage, but Madge tricks the town by impersonating Frankie.
18	"Zhurassic Park"	Hugh Duffy	Bradley Overall	August 14, 2017 (Note: This episode aired on Disney Channel in Poland on June 21, 2017, the Watch Disney Channel app on July 8, and Czech Republic and Hungary on July 12.)	July 27, 2017	0.77
18	"Hamster a la Kart"	Scott Albert	Andrew Tan	August 14, 2017	July 27, 2017	0.77
Frankie and the Zhus are inspired to make cave paintings after watching a film about caves in school. After learning that Madge has won the annual go-kart race every year, Frankie and the Zhus enter the go-kart race so they can break Madge's winning streak.
19	"Zhu and Improved"	Miles Smith	Bradley Overall	August 15, 2017 (Note: This episode aired on Disney Channel in Poland on June 22, 2017, Czech Republic and Hungary on July 13, and the Watch Disney Channel app on July 15.)	July 28, 2017	0.74
19	"The Unfortunate Cookie Crumbles"	Laurie Elliott	John Flagg	August 15, 2017	July 28, 2017	0.74
After overhearing the family's concerns with his inventions, Mr. Squiggles decides to quit science and become a surfer. Frankie and the Zhus try to avoid having an unlucky day after a fortune cookie tells them that they will have one.
20	"Now Zhu See Me, Now Zhu Don't"	Jennifer Daley	Bradley Overall	August 16, 2017 (Note: This episode aired on Disney Channel in the Czech Republic and Hungary on July 14, 2017, and the Watch Disney Channel app on July 23.)	July 31, 2017	0.66
20	"Walk a Mile in Our Zhus"	Andrew Harrison	Andrew Tan	August 16, 2017	July 31, 2017	0.66
After seeing the Amazing Donald's magic show, Frankie tries to make Chunk invisible. But he falls into a hamster tube and runs around town, thinking the trick had worked. Frankie realizes she's too big to enjoy some of the games her and the Zhus play, so she dreams about being small.
21	"Zhu Got Game"	Miles Smith	Steve Remen	August 17, 2017 (Note: This episode was released on the Watch Disney Channel app on July 29, 2017, and it aired on Disney Channel in Czech Republic and Hungary on August 13.)	August 1, 2017	0.57
21	"And the Hammy Goes To"	Andrew Harrison	John Flagg	August 17, 2017	August 1, 2017	0.57
Frankie's board game transforms her house into a castle. Frankie nominates the Zhus in her own awards show after learning that they've never won a trophy.
22	"Pranksters' Paradise"	Terry McGurrin	Steve Remen	August 18, 2017 (Note: This episode was released on the Watch Disney Channel app on August 8, 2017, and it aired on and Disney Channel in Czech Republic and Hungary on August 14.)	August 2, 2017	0.64
When the Zhus are ordered to take care of Chunk's cousins Jilly and Bean, the Zhus must make sure they don't ruin Frankie's fancy party.
23	"Ball in a Day's Work"	Andrew Harrison	Andrew Tan	August 21, 2017 (Note: This episode aired on Disney Channel in Czech Republic and Hungary on August 15, 2017.)	August 22, 2017	0.78
23	"How Zhu Get Ahead in Advertising"	Andrew Harrison	Steve Remen	August 21, 2017	August 22, 2017	0.78
While preparing for her next baseball tournament at the baseball stadium tomorrow, Frankie plays in the house, causing her baseball to be taken away for a week, and the Zhus to face this. Ever since every commercial they find boring has relieved on them for 24 whole hours, Frankie and the Zhus work on their own commercials to beat the ad record.
24	"Zhuper Girl in a Jam"	Miles Smith	John Flagg	August 22, 2017 (Note: This episode aired on Disney Channel in Czech Republic and Hungary on August 16, 2017.)	August 22, 2017	0.66
24	"Frankielocks and the 4 Zhus"	Andrew Harrison	Steve Remen	August 22, 2017	August 22, 2017	0.66
Zhuper Girl solves a crime again, But this time, her new archenemy gets back at her for saving the day. In a story about Goldilocks and The Three Bears, Frankie and the Zhus start a play about themselves in the story.
25	"Your Days Are Num Num Numbered"	Miles Smith	Steve Remen	August 23, 2017	August 22, 2017	0.68
25	"Zhus the Boss"	Andrew Harrison	Steve Remen	August 23, 2017	August 22, 2017	0.68
Num Nums makes a new quilt, and the other Zhus ruin accidentally wreck it. She quits being herself and refuses to help them when they are in danger. Tired of Frankie's parents being in charge all the time, Frankie and the Zhus make up their own house rules.
26	"Zhu Land"	Hugh Duffy	Andrew Tan & Alan Resnick	August 24, 2017 (Note: This episode was released on the Watch Disney Channel app on August 8, 2017.)	August 22, 2017	0.72

== Shorts ==
A short webseries called "Zhu's News" was released to YTV's YouTube channel starting July 17, 2017. Each episode stars Whendy Sails of Channel 5 recapping moments in the series.

No.	Title	Canadian release date	American release date
1	"Pumped Up Zhus"	July 17, 2017	TBA
2	"Food for Thought"	July 18, 2017	TBA
3	"Animal House"	July 21, 2017	August 8, 2017
4	"The Magnificent Zhus"	July 22, 2017	August 8, 2017
5	"Home Video"	July 23, 2017	TBA
6	"Cousin Capers"	July 24, 2017	TBA
7	"Put on Your Dancing Zhus"	July 25, 2017	August 8, 2017
8	"Zhurrific Make Overs"	July 25, 2017	TBA

== Release ==
=== Broadcast ===
The ZhuZhus debuted on Disney Channel in the United States on September 12, 2016 as Polly and the ZhuZhu Pets. After the show went on a hiatus and changed its name, the first episode to air was "Zhu Years Eve/Lookies for Cookies" on January 7, 2017, and the show was added to the Get Animated! block. On August 29, 2016, Denise Petski of Deadline Hollywood announced that Disney Channels Worldwide acquired both multi-territory broadcast and on demand rights to The ZhuZhus in Australia, Austria, Belgium, Central and Eastern Europe, Germany, Luxembourg, the Middle East, the Netherlands, New Zealand, Russia, Sub-Saharan Africa, and Switzerland. The series aired on Disney Channel in Australia and New Zealand on February 13, 2017, Disney Channel in South Africa on March 6, and Boomerang in the United Kingdom and Ireland on May 2. The series was scheduled to premiere on YTV in Canada in December 2016, but eventually it premiered on July 4, 2017. Reruns in Canada premiere airs on Disney Channel and Disney Junior.

=== Home media ===
On September 25, 2018, Cinedigm released a DVD featuring all 26 episodes of the series named "The ZhuZhus: Season 1".

== Reception ==
The series received generally positive reviews from critics and audiences. Emily Ashby of Common Sense Media rated The ZhuZhus a 5 out of 5 stars, stating "The series does well to stand on its own entertainment merit, it also is the sweetest Disney show ever, season 2 must happen and our 5 out of 5 ratings clearly proves that." Bruce Katz of Cepia feels that "the animation further enhanced the personality of the characters," and says that "they've captured the essence of what ZhuZhu Pets is all about."

== Media information ==
Two online games are currently available on The ZhuZhus website called Tube Racers and Costume Couture. An app was also released on April 18, 2017, called The ZhuZhus: Zhuniverse, which is available to play on iTunes and Google Play.
