= Medialink (disambiguation) =

Medialink is a Hong Kong-based corporation that specializes in licensing anime for South and Southeast Asia.

Medialink may also refer to:

- MediaLink, a company founded by Michael Kassan that focuses on business to business services
- Media Link (TV Broadcaster), a Bulgarian TV broadcaster
- Media.link Communications, a Maltese mass media corporation
