= ZhuZhu Pets =

American line of plush robotic hamster toys

- Invented by: Russ Hornsby
- Company: Cepia LLC
- Country: United States
- Availability: 2009–2013, 2017–2018, 2024–present
- Official website

ZhuZhu Pets (Mandarin pronunciation: [tʂú tʂú], formerly known as Go Go Pets) is an American line of plush robotic hamster toys created by Cepia LLC in 2009. Multiple spin-off toy lines, including ZhuZhu Puppies and Kung Zhus, have been released.

== History ==
PipSqueak ZhuZhu Hamster

ZhuZhu Pets were created by Russ Hornsby for his St. Louis company, Cepia LLC. The name comes from Mandarin zhūzhū (Chinese: 猪猪), meaning "little pig." In late 2009, Cepia employed only 16 people in the U.S. and 30 in China. The original ZhuZhu Pets are nine different characters, with names including Chunk, PipSqueak, Mr. Squiggles, and Num Nums. There are various accessories for creating customized hamster habitats. ZhuZhu Pets can be put in either of two play modes: "nurturing mode," in which they coo and purr, or "adventure mode," in which they explore their habitat and respond to various stimuli.

The toy first launched under the name Go Go Pets in July 2009, but was rebranded as ZhuZhu Pets in October. Cepia soon signed a distribution deal with Character Options to release the product (under the Go Go Pets name) in the United Kingdom for the 2009 Christmas season. ZhuZhu Pets were a craze during the 2009 holidays. They originally retailed for US$9, but for a time they sold for over $100 because of shortages.

In December 2009, testing done by the consumer organisation GoodGuide was initially thought to have found more than the allowed level of the toxic, silvery metalloid antimony in the Mr. Squiggles toy. After a review, regulators from the U.S. Consumer Product Safety Commission said that the toy was within the "very protective" standard. GoodGuide subsequently issued an apology saying that their testing methods (which checked for surface toxins) were different from the federal standards (which check for soluble toxins.)

Cepia encourages collecting of ZhuZhu Pets. Exclusive pets have been released in collaboration with Hallmark, Build-A-Bear Workshop, and Toys "R" Us. In early 2010 a set of new characters was released, including the Rockstar pets (Roxie, Ryder, Pax, and Kingston), inspired by the children of celebrities such as Angelina Jolie and Gwen Stefani. The brand continued to expand international, with an Asian (including Japan) distribution deal with Sega Toys occurring in January, with Sega Toys planning on releasing manga and animated adaptions. A European (non-UK) deal with Giochi Preziosi occurred the following year.

The range expanded in 2010 with new sub-themes, starting with ZhuZhu Babies, which were not electronic or plush, but plastic toys articulated with a small ball under their belly. Summer 2010 saw the launch of Kung Zhu, aimed at a male audience age 8–12 and focused on battling hamsters. In December 2010, the ZhuZhu Princess series was released, as was a line of sixteen Burger King toys. The success of the product led to several tie-in products, one example being Hasbro's FurReal Friends Furry Frenzies, which featured other animals. This inspired Cepia to release additional products in the "Zhu-niverse" in 2011, such as ZhuZhu Puppies, which were robotic puppies that move around and bark, and a revived version of ZhuZhu Babies, which now featured baby hamsters with motors. In 2012, this was expanded further to include Zhu-Fari, which featured many different wild animals, ZhuZhu Kittens, a spin-off of the Puppies line, and ZhuZhu Ponies, which featured fillies. To promote the direct-to-video film Quest for Zhu, four Happy Meal toys were released at McDonald's restaurants outside the United States.

The franchise was quietly discontinued by the end of 2013, due to decreasing sales. A short-lived spin-off subseries titled The Amazing Zhus debuted in Mid-2014, but was discontinued shortly afterwards.

=== 2017 Revival ===
In 2015, Cepia LLC planned to reboot ZhuZhu Pets with a new look in partnership with Nelvana, who would produce a new television series titled Polly and the ZhuZhu Pets for a 2016 delivery. This revival would being the toys back to their roots with the original four hamsters.

Polly and the ZhuZhu Pets debuted on September 12, 2016, on Disney Channel in the United States, before being expanded internationally and gaining a renaming to The ZhuZhus, with Polly being renamed Frankie. Cepia signed a toy master agreement with Spin Master, and in February 2017 they showcased the ZhuZhu Pets franchise at Toy Fair with designs, based more on the TV series.

In 2018, ZhuZhu Pets was discontinued again, following the ending of the cartoon and lower-than-expected sales.

=== 2024 Revival ===
In May 2023, Cepia LLC filed a trademark for 'ZhuZhu'. In June, the website was completely refreshed to say that ZhuZhu would be "Returning Soon". Rumours of the franchise returning were soon confirmed true by employees at Cepia, and in September 2023, Cepia LLC uploaded a video on Vimeo showing the first new ZhuZhu Pets line for 2024 called "Zhu Zhu Aquarium", featuring marine animals. The new line was showcased at New York Toy Fair 2023 and made its debut release in April 2024. The brand is currently active as of today, with the website online for their debut, alongside the idea that this new series/generation of Zhu Zhu Pets is set to expand later on.

== Video games ==
In December 2009, Activision and GameMill Publishing signed an agreement with Cepia to release ZhuZhu Pets video games. The first title, simply titled ZhuZhu Pets, was released in March 2010 for the Nintendo DS, iOS, and Microsoft Windows.

In August 2010, Activision and GameMill Entertainment signed an agreement to release a Kung Zhu title for the Nintendo DS. alongside a sequel to the original title, this time based on the "Wild Bunch" subtheme. Kung Zhu and ZhuZhu Pets 2: Featuring The Wild Bunch were both released in October for the Nintendo DS, while the latter was also released on the Wii.

Additional Nintendo DS titles were released in 2011 - ZhuZhu Princess: Carriages & Castles (a reskin of the first title) was released at the end of February, followed up with Zhu Zhu Puppies at the end of March, a game tie-in to the Quest for Zhu movie in September, and ZhuZhu Babies (a re-skin of the second title) in November.

Coinciding with the release of Quest for Zhu, a video game adaptation for the Nintendo DS was released.

== Films ==
Sega Toys attempted to adapt Zhu Zhu Pets with a manga and animated project in Japan.

Cepia LLC partnered with Dream Gardens to develop movies based upon the brand with distribution by Universal Pictures. On September 27, 2011, the franchise's first full-length feature film, Quest for Zhu, was released straight-to-DVD.

A second full-length feature film, The Power of Zhu, was slated for a 2012 direct-to-DVD release. A third film, Secret of Zhu, was also planned. However, Universal International distributed the second film, retitled Amazing Adventures of Zhu, in the Brazilian and French markets without Cepia's knowledge or approval sometime between 2011 and 2012. Cepia said this "destroyed the potential DVD/Blu-Ray market" for films based upon the ZhuZhu Pets.

== See also ==
- The ZhuZhus
