= The In-Between (2019 film) =

2019 American road trip film by Mindy Bledsoe

- Directed by: Mindy Bledsoe
- Written by: Mindy Bledsoe; Rob Senska; Jennifer Stone
- Produced by: Chris Lyon; Jennifer Stone; Blayne Weaver; Rob Senska; Mindy Bledsoe
- Starring: Mindy Bledsoe; Jennifer Stone; Rane Jameson
- Cinematography: Rob Senska
- Edited by: Mindy Bledsoe; Rob Senska; Chris Lyon
- Music by: Super Water Sympathy; Hydrogen Child
- Production companies: Bledska Works; Perennial Media Entertainment
- Distributed by: Secret Identity Pictures
- Release dates: May 4, 2019 (Twister Alley); May 7, 2021
- Running time: 78 minutes
- Language: English

The In-Between is a 2019 American road trip film directed by Mindy Bledsoe. The film follows two women who set out across the American West in search of resolution of past pains and an understanding of what friendship and family truly means.

The film stars Jennifer Stone and Mindy Bledsoe. Stone plays Mads, a young woman with Type 1 diabetes whose mother disappeared when she was a child. Mindy Bledsoe plays Junior, a 40-year-old woman who suffers from Complex Regional Pain Syndrome Type 2 and whose sister, Veronica, was killed in a car accident. Veronica is played by musician Ansley Rimmer, the vocalist for the bands Super Water Sympathy and Hydrogen Child, which provided the film's soundtrack.

The film premiered at the 2019 Twister Alley Film Festival in Woodward, Oklahoma.

== Plot ==
Mads and Junior, two friends united by their chronic illness, leave Los Angeles on a road trip. Mads is returning home to South Dakota to renew her drivers license. Junior is re-living a similar road trip between her and her sister, Veronica, which resulted in Veronica's death years before. The pair visit quirky landmarks and a train of cheap motels, recounting their past and the daily challenges their illnesses present. As the trip progresses, Junior discovers that Mads has been hiding a secret that could tear their friendship apart.

== Cast ==
- Jennifer Stone as Mads Olsen
- Mindy Bledsoe as Junior Bramley
- Rane Jameson as Miles Olsen
- Ansley Rimmer as Veronica Bramley

== Reception ==
The In-Between had an extensive festival run, garnering more than a dozen awards including Best Feature at Women Texas Film Festival, Cordillera International Film Festival, Twister Alley Film Festival, Female Eye Film Festival, and Austin Revolution Film Festival. The film also won numerous awards for the acting of both Stone and Bledsoe, including Gig Harbor Film Festival, Billy the Kid Film Festival, Twister Alley Film Festival, Big Bear Film Summit. Bledsoe won Best Director at Simply Indie Film Fest.

The film has been praised for its representation of chronic illness, particularly Complex Regional Pain Syndrome (CRPS/RSD) and Type 1 diabetes. Sarah Ward of Orca Sound wrote "It’s to The In-Between’s immense credit that their illnesses aren’t used to wring tears, nor simply mentioned once then overlooked."

As of October 2021, the film carries a 100% rating on Rotten Tomatoes. Jessica Baxter of Hammer to Nail writes "Bledsoe’s debut is a beautiful tribute to sisterly bonds and learning to let go." John Higgens of Film and TV Now writes "The In-Between is an extraordinary achievement, both on-screen and off.... Bledsoe and Stone provide two balanced and courageous performances..."
