= Melinda Shankar =

Canadian actress (born 1992)

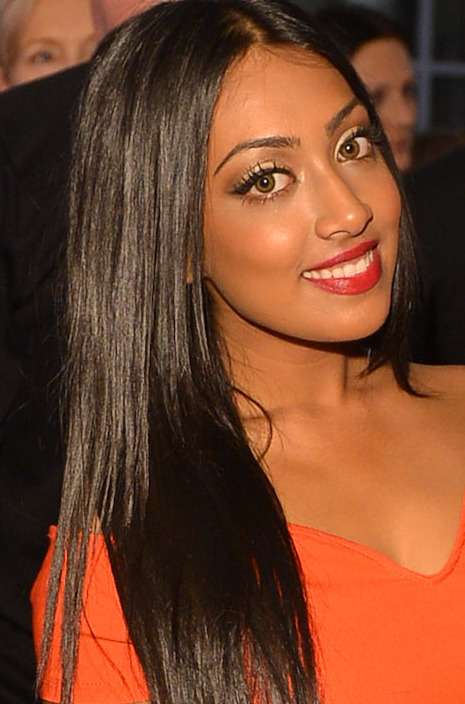
- Shankar at 2013 Canadian Screen Awards Nominee Reception
- Born: February 18, 1992 (age 34); Ottawa, Ontario, Canada
- Occupation: Actress
- Years active: 2008–present
- Known for: Degrassi: The Next Generation
- Spouse: Joshua Erlick (m. 2026)
- Children: 1

Melinda Leanna Shankar (born February 18, 1992) is a Canadian actress. She is best known for starring as Alli Bhandari in the television series Degrassi: The Next Generation (2008–2015) and as Indira "Indie" Mehta in the YTV series How To Be Indie (2009–2011), for which she won several awards, including a Canadian Screen Award in 2013. Her last screen credit was the female lead role of Sarah in the 2025 Air Canada and Ottawa Tourism's YouTube channel Christmas show, Magic On Set.

== Early life ==
Melinda Shankar was born on February 18, 1992, in Ottawa, Ontario, Canada, to Canadian parents of Hindu Indo-Guyanese descent who immigrated to Canada. She has two older sisters and a brother, who is also an actor. She was raised in Orleans, Ontario, a suburban section of Ottawa.

Her father owned a karate school in Ottawa, with her beginning to study the practice at three. She began to study ballet at the same age. Shankar currently has a black belt in karate. She attended Sir Wilfrid Laurier Secondary School in Ottawa until grade 11 before moving to Toronto when she was sixteen, following her casting in Degrassi: The Next Generation in 2008.

== Career ==
=== Acting ===
Shankar began her career as a child model and appeared in numerous print advertisements, including a Procter & Gamble billboard in Los Angeles. Shankar's mother was an actress and her paternal grandfather was a director in Guyana. Shankar's father would often drive up to five hours from Ottawa to Toronto for her auditions.

In 2008, she debuted as an actress in the popular CTV television series Degrassi, joining the cast as an incoming 9th grade student. Shankar appeared in a total of seven seasons, until its finale in 2015.

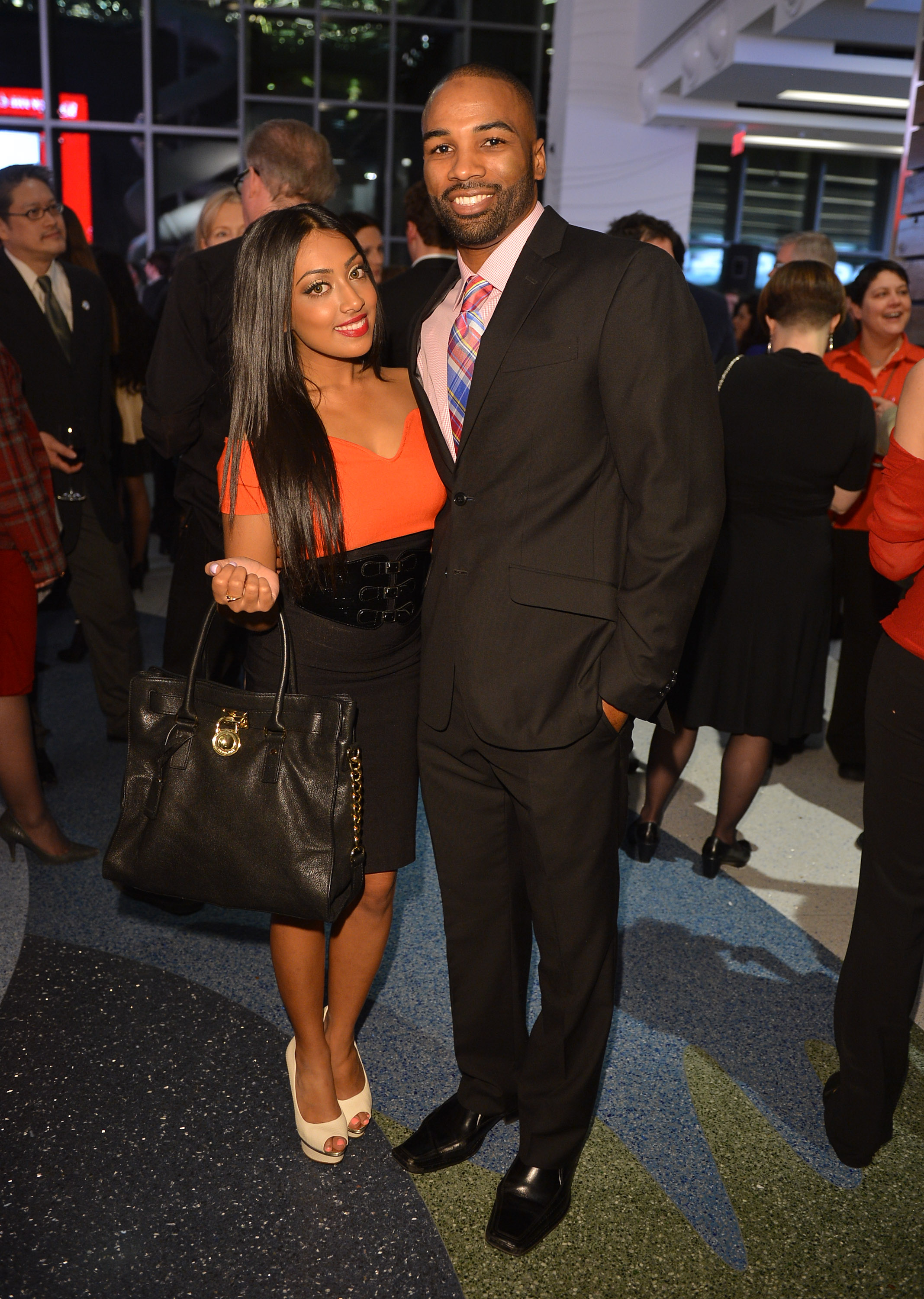
Shankar with Andra Fuller at 2013 Canadian Screen Awards Nominee Reception

In 2009, she starred in a television series on YTV called How To Be Indie. She played the lead role of Indira "Indie" Metha for two seasons. The series aired its final episode on October 24, 2011. For her role, Shankar won a Gemini Award in 2011 and a Canadian Screen Award in 2013.

She co-starred alongside Jennifer Stone and Vanessa Morgan in the 2010 children's television film Harriet the Spy: Blog Wars.

Shankar was cast in her first feature film, Festival of Lights in 2010. The movie was filmed on location in New York City and Georgetown, Guyana. Her father served as production manager for the film due to his familiarity with the locations in Guyana.

She has appeared in all three of the Christmas with a Prince television film franchise as Bella since 2018.

=== Other work ===
In 2013, Shankar and a longtime childhood friend began working on an image consulting business. On February 22, 2014, they launched Miss Conception, a professional styling and image agency based in Toronto. By no later than October 2017, the Miss Conception website had been shut down.

== Personal life ==
As of March 2012, Shankar resided in Toronto's Willowdale neighbourhood.

Shankar is a supporter of the Breaking Boards, Breaking Chains campaign, an event to raise funds for young survivors of sexual assault in Bolivia.

In October 2025, she married Joshua Erlick. Almost a year later, on October 3, 2026, the couple welcomed their first child, a daughter named Melrose.

== Filmography ==
=== Film ===
Year	Title	Role	Notes
2010	Trigger	Rocker Chick #1	
2010	Festival of Lights	Reshma	
2017	Filth City	Monica	
2018	Blindsided	Mika	
2018	Blink	Carrie	Short film
2020	Survival Smarts	Mindy	Short film
2021	Red String of Fate	Danika Mondal	

=== Television ===
Year	Title	Role	Notes
2008–2015	Degrassi: The Next Generation	Allia "Alli" Bhandari	Main cast
2009	Degrassi Goes Hollywood	Allia "Alli" Bhandari	TV movie
2009–2011	How To Be Indie	Indira "Indie" Mehta	Title role
2010	Degrassi in India	Self	TV special
2010	Degrassi Takes Manhattan	Allia "Alli" Bhandari	TV movie
2010	Harriet the Spy: Blog Wars	Janie Gibbs	TV movie
2011	Degrassi in Haiti	Self	TV special
2013	Alive	Kaitlyn	TV movie
2017	Darker Than Night	Mika	
2017	Mooom	Kylie	
2017	Filth City	Monica	9 episodes
2017	Slasher: Guilty Party	Talvinder "Tal" Gill	Main cast
2017	Christmas Wedding Planner	Jealous Bridesmaid	TV movie
2018	Christmas with a Prince	Bella	TV movie
2019	Christmas with a Prince: Becoming a Royal	Bella	TV movie
2019	True Dating Stories	Detective Banks	Episode: "Steph"
2020	The Wedding Planners	Izzy	Episode: "Wedding of Champions"
2020	DM 4 Revenge	Dana Mohan	Episode: "Demo"; Also creator & executive producer
2021	Romance in the Wilds	Amara	TV movie
2021	Christmas in the Wilds	Amara	TV Movie
2021	Christmas with a Prince: The Royal Baby	Bella	TV movie

== Awards and nominations ==
Year	Award	Category	Work	Result	Ref.
2011	Gemini Awards	Best Performance in a Children's or Youth Program or Series	How to Be Indie	Won	
2013	Canadian Screen Awards	Best Performance in a Children's or Youth Program or Series	How to Be Indie	Won	
2018	First Glance Film Festival	Best Actress (Web Series)	Filth City	Nominated	
2018	First Glance Film Festival	Best Ensemble Cast (Web Series)	Filth City	Won	
2020	Indie Series Awards	Best Guest Actress - Comedy	True Dating Stories	Nominated	
