= GoodGuide =

Former online service providing evaluations on various impacts of consumer products

GoodGuide.Com was an online web, iPhone app and Android app tool which enabled consumers to retrieve evaluations of the health, environmental, and social impacts of consumer products such as toys, food, and detergents. GoodGuide was acquired in 2012 and shut down on June 1, 2020.

Through its website, online toolbar and smartphone application, GoodGuide provided tools for consumers to make purchasing decisions on the basis of the health, environmental and social impact of a product's life cycle. These products are designed to provide consumers with this information right at the point of sale, to help them to apply their values to their purchases. The GoodGuide smartphone app read the bar codes on product labels using the phone's camera, and provides a summary of the product's score according to GoodGuide's rating system.

== History ==
GoodGuide was created by University of California-Berkeley professor Dara O'Rourke, originally under the name Tao-It.

As an internet startup, GoodGuide raised $3.73 million in its first round of funding reported in January 2009 and $5.5 million in its second round reported in June 2009 from venture capitalists. As of May 31, 2010, according to Alexa Internet the website ranked about 50,000 worldwide, but about 20,000 in the United States.

GoodGuide was acquired in 2012 by UL Environment.

== Ratings ==
For each listed product the site generates three ratings: a health rating, an environmental ratings, and a social rating. GoodGuide databases include the energy and resource consumed plus the pollution produced in manufacturing the product, the nutritional value of foods, the agricultural and animal husbandry practices, and the corporate sponsorship of social and political philanthropy.

=== Testing ===
In December 2009 testing of Zhu Zhu Pets done by GoodGuide reported more than the allowed level of the toxic metal antimony in the toy Mr. Squiggles. After review, regulators from the U.S. Consumer Product Safety Commission said that the toy was within the "very protective" Federal mandatory standard. GoodGuide subsequently issued an apology saying their testing methods were different from the federal standards.

== Reviews and awards ==
GoodGuide was a final jury selection for TechCrunch50 in September 2008.

== See also ==
- List of websites about food and drink
- Ethical consumerism
- Ecolabel
- Sustainable seafood advisory lists and certification
- Seafood Watch
- Green brands
- Fair trade
