= Dara O'Rourke =

American sociologist

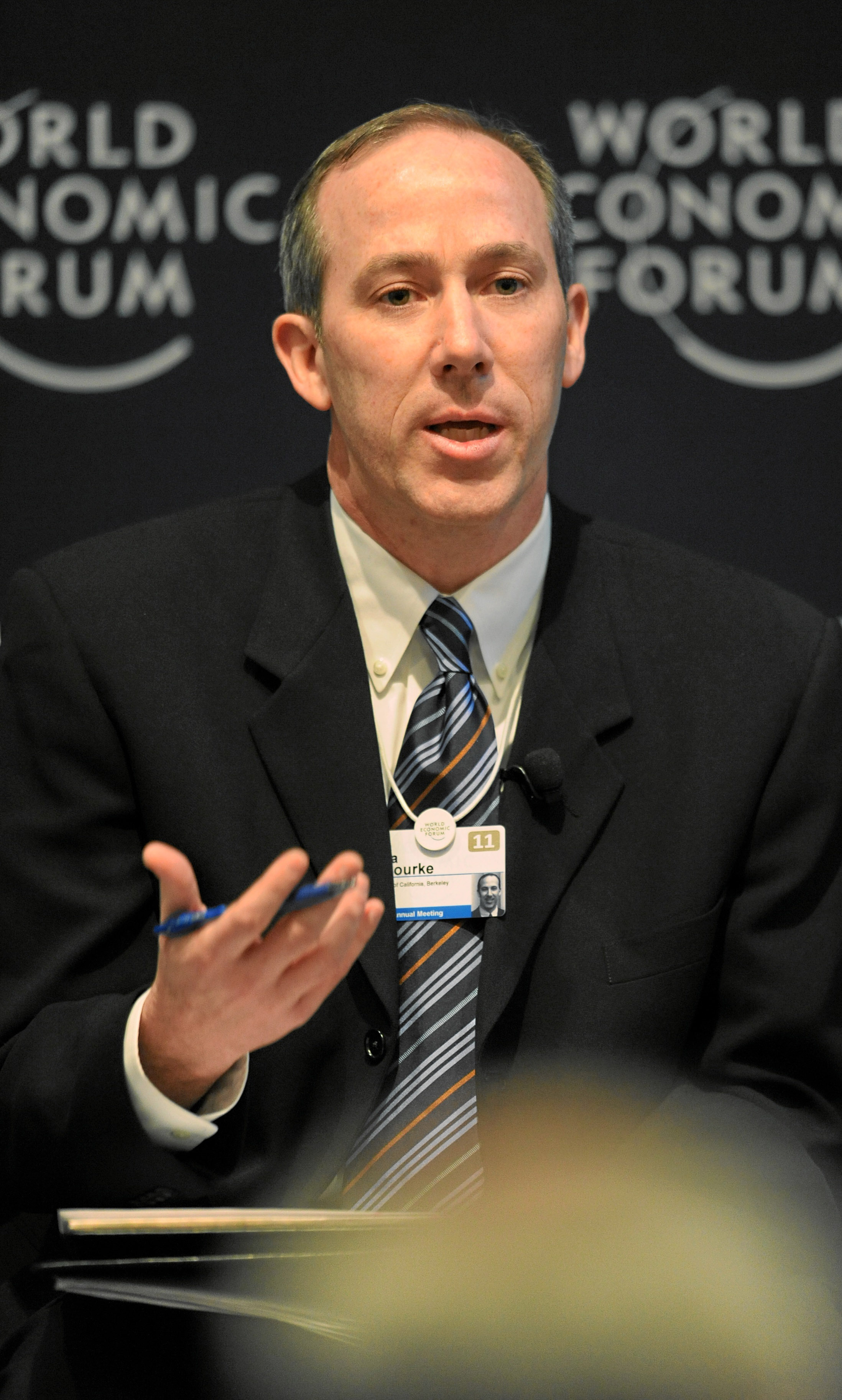
- O'Rourke during the WEF 2011
- Education: Massachusetts Institute of Technology undergrad; University of California, Berkeley M.S. and PhD
- Occupations: Professor, author, social entrepreneur
- Notable credit(s): environmental scientist, information scientist, and professor at the University of California, Berkeley; founder of GoodGuide

Dara O'Rourke is an environmental scientist, information scientist and professor at the University of California, Berkeley where he holds an appointment in the Department of Environmental Science, Policy, and Management. O'Rourke was the founder of Tao It, a database that ranked consumer products based on how healthy and environmentally friendly they are. After a name change, Tao it became GoodGuide, an online consumer tool for retrieving information about the supply chain of consumer products such as toys, food, and detergents. GoodGuide was acquired in 2012 and shut down in 2020. Prior to teaching at Berkeley, O'Rourke taught at the Massachusetts Institute of Technology.

== See also ==
- Environmental Science
- Information Science
