= Festival of Lights (film) =

- Release poster
- Directed by: Shundell Prasad
- Screenplay by: Shundell Prasad
- Produced by: Graziano Bruni; Eli P. Navon; Eve Pomerance; Shundell Prasad
- Starring: Melinda Shankar; Aidan Quinn; Ritu Singh Pande; Jimi Mistry
- Cinematography: Valentina Caniglia
- Edited by: Barry Alexander Brown
- Music by: Ronen Landa
- Production company: IndustryWorks Pictures
- Distributed by: Durga Entertainment
- Release date: November 13, 2010 (Saint Louis Film Festival)
- Running time: 120 minutes
- Country: United States
- Languages: English; Guyanese Creole
- Budget: $1.5 million

Festival of Lights is a 2010 film directed and written by Shundell Prasad. It stars Melinda Shankar as the rebellious and mouthy Reshma, Jimi Mistry as Reshma's birth father, and Aidan Quinn as Reshma's stepfather. The film deals with Reshma's struggles to find her father whom she was separated from when she and her mother, played by Ritu Singh Pande, migrate from Guyana to New York City.

== Plot ==
Separated from her father when their family immigrates from Guyana, a young girl comes of age in New York City. Battling through a troubled youth and a broken relationship with her mother, she struggles to find peace and discover the secret of what happened to her father.

== Cast ==
- Melinda Shankar as Reshma
- Jimi Mistry as Vishnu, Reshma's father
- Aidan Quinn as Adem, Reshma's stepfather
- Ritu Singh Pande as Meena, Reshma's mother
- Stephen Hadeed, Jr. as Ravin
- Nandanie Dudhnath as Asha
- Isabella A. Santos as Sandy
- Dion Matthews as Warden's Assistant

== Production ==
The film was directed, written and co-produced by Shundell Prasad. It was filmed in Georgetown, Guyana and Queens, New York.
