= High School Possession =

- Screenplay by: Hanz Wasserburger
- Story by: Jeffrey Schenck; Peter Sullivan; Hanz Wasserburger
- Directed by: Peter Sullivan
- Starring: Janel Parrish; Jennifer Stone; Shanley Caswell; Ione Skye; Kelly Hu; William McNamara; Chris Brochu; Maya Stojan
- Music by: Matthew Janszen
- Country of origin: United States
- Original language: English

Production
- Cinematography: Roberto Schein
- Editor: Randy Carter
- Running time: 88 minutes
- Production company: Production Media Group

Original release
- Network: Lifetime
- Release: October 25, 2014

High School Possession is a 2014 American thriller television film directed by Peter Sullivan. The film stars Janel Parrish, Jennifer Stone, Shanley Caswell, Ione Skye, and Kelly Hu. It premiered on Lifetime on October 25, 2014.

== Plot ==
Lauren, an editor at her high school newspaper, believes her best friend is possessed and tries to get a reverend to conduct an exorcism on her. When he refuses, Lauren takes matters into her own hands to get the ritual performed.

== Cast ==
- Jennifer Stone as Chloe Mitchell
- Janel Parrish as Lauren Brady
- Shanley Caswell as Olivia Marks
- Kelly Hu as Denise Brady
- Ione Skye as Bonnie Mitchell
- William McNamara as Reverend Young
- Chris Brochu as Mase Adkins
- Maya Stojan as Emma
