= Quest for Zhu =

- Directed by: Bob Douchette
- Written by: Sean Derek
- Based on: ZhuZhu Pets
- Produced by: Laura Kurzu; Bob Douchette; Ashley Hornsby; Meghan Hornsby
- Starring: Mariah Wilkerson; Shannon Chan-Kent; Ian James Corlett; Sean Campbell; Erin Mathews; Jillian Michaels; Jan Rabson; Kathleen Barr
- Edited by: Richard Finn
- Music by: Michael Tavera
- Production companies: MoonScoop; Cepia LLC; The Dream Garden Company; Prana Studios
- Distributed by: Universal Studios Home Entertainment
- Release date: September 27, 2011
- Running time: 73 minutes
- Countries: United States; Canada
- Language: English

Quest for Zhu is a 2011 direct-to-DVD animated action/adventure film and the first full-length feature film based on the ZhuZhu Pets franchise. It stars Mariah Wilkerson, Shannon Chan-Kent, Ian James Corlett, Sean Campbell, Erin Mathews, Jillian Michaels, Jan Rabson, and Kathleen Barr. The film was released on DVD on September 27, 2011.

== Plot ==
Pipsqueak, a hamster, is scolded by her owner Katie after trying to make a card for her, with Katie believing that Pipsqueak is making a mess. Katie startles Pipsqueak, and she ends up making a real mess. After an angered Katie leaves the room, a shooting star appears above her house, which sucks Pipsqueak in and transports her to the Zhuniverse.

Pipsqueak meets a brown hamster named Mr. Squiggles, a grey hamster named Num Nums, and a white hamster named Chunk, whom she tells about her problem. A skunk named Stinker introduces himself and tells them about the wizard Zhu Fu, who can help Pipsqueak return home. As the four travel to Zhu Fu's palace, Pipsqueak learns the backgrounds of the other hamsters. Chunk and Num Nums were left behind after being separated from their owners: Chunk after going surfing on his own, and Num Nums after his owner moved to an apartment that did not allow pets. Mr. Squiggles previously lived in a pet store until he managed to escape.

Upon reaching the palace, the hamsters, still annoyed with Stinker, ask him where the "happy hams" he promised are. Though the yard around the palace is empty, Stinker, saying that the happy hams are inside, promises a guided tour, but the palace's doors, which are covered with carved birthmark symbols, do not open until the symbols suddenly begin to glow and blink. The four symbols belonging to Pipsqueak, Num Nums, Chunk, and Mr. Squiggles remain lit, and the doors open on their own.

Inside the palace, the hamsters meet with Zhu Fu, but he transforms into a lizard-like creature called Mazhula. She has disguised herself as Zhu Fu, after capturing him and many other hamsters and forcing them to work as slaves to create magical energy for her. Stinker is revealed to have been working for Mazhula, luring the hamsters to the palace to be new slaves.

After escaping from Mazhula, the hamsters meet with the real Zhu Fu, who explains that Mazhula draws her power from a large urn empowered by her captives. The hamsters get the idea to fill the urn with a sticky substance so that Mazhula cannot draw power from it. Mazhula corners the hamsters and tries to destroy them, but runs out of power. Furious, she goes back to her throne and tries to recharge, but finds the urn full of carrot paste. At Mr. Squiggles' insistence, Zhu Fu sends Mazhula to the same pet store where Squiggles was once kept.

Pipsqueak, realizing that she misses Katie, asks to go home, and Zhu Fu explains that she could have returned home by calling on the star that brought her to the Zhuniverse. After saying goodbye to Num Nums, Mr. Squiggles, and Chunk, Pipsqueak returns home.

Back at home, Katie, who had been searching for Pipsqueak, reunites with her. Amidst their reunion, Num Nums, Mr. Squiggles, and Chunk show up on the windowsill, having been sent after Pipsqueak by Zhu Fu. Katie, delighted to have three new pets, goes to the kitchen to make them a snack.

== Cast ==
- Mariah Wilkerson as Katie
- Shannon Chan-Kent as Pipsqueak
- Ian James Corlett as Mr. Squiggles, Stinker, and Zhuquasha
- Sean Campbell as Chunk
- Erin Mathews as Num Nums and Surfer
- Jillian Michaels as Jilly
- Jan Rabson as Zhu Fu
- Kathleen Barr as Mazhula

== Production ==
Prior to Quest for Zhu, Sega Toys attempted to adapt Zhu Zhu Pets with a manga and animated project in Japan. Cepia LLC partnered with Dream Gardens to develop films based upon the brand, with distribution by Universal Pictures.

== Marketing ==
=== Soundtrack ===
The film's soundtrack was released on November 21, 2011.

=== Video game ===
Coinciding with the film's release, a video game adaptation for the Nintendo DS was released.

== Awards ==
In 2011, Quest for Zhu was nominated for a Golden Reel Award for Outstanding Achievement in Sound Editing – Non-Theatrical Animation Long Form, but lost to Megamind: The Button of Doom.

== Sequels ==
There was a four-part miniseries, "Royal Trouble", that was a sequel to the film, as well as a series of animated music videos featuring the characters.

There were supposed to be three Zhu Zhu Pets films; a second full-length feature film, The Power of Zhu, was slated for a 2012 direct-to-DVD release, and a third, Secret of Zhu, was also planned. Sometime between 2011 and 2012, the second film, retitled The Amazing Adventures of Zhu, was completed and "secretly distributed" to TV stations in France and Brazil. Both it and Secret of Zhu have since been distributed through Kabillion's streaming partners.

== See also ==
- The ZhuZhus, a 2016 television series also starring Pipsqueak, Num Nums, Mr. Squiggles, and Chunk
