= Media Link (TV Broadcaster) =

Media Link is Bulgarian company, which main activity is representation of foreign TV to Bulgaria and implementation of voice-overs of foreign programs. Since 2000, the company is representative of Fox Kids (later Jetix, and Disney Channel Bulgaria), Bulgarian National Television and National Geographic Channel.

Since 2007, Media Link began dubbing different series, mostly for Diema, and in October of the same year, for Jetix. At the end of 2008 the translation of the documentaries on National Geographic Channel Bulgaria switches the subtitles with dubbing, and a little later, in December, all announces on the TV also sound in Bulgarian. The same was expected to happen with Jetix, but after the company of Walt Disney decides to rebrand it to Disney Channel, the full localization was not done since early 2009.
