= Disney Jr. (Romania) =

Television channel

Disney Junior
- Logo used since 12 August 2024
- Country: United Kingdom
- Broadcast area: Romania
- Headquarters: 3 Queen Caroline Street, Hammersmith, London W6 9PE, United Kingdom

Programming
- Languages: Romanian; English
- Picture format: HDTV 1080i

Ownership
- Owner: The Walt Disney Company Limited; Disney Branded Television (Disney Entertainment)
- Sister channels: Disney Channel

History
- Launched: 19 September 2009; 17 years ago (as Playhouse Disney); 1 June 2011; 15 years ago (as a block on Disney Channel); 1 March 2012; 14 years ago (as a separate channel)
- Closed: February 29, 2012; 14 years ago (Programming block)
- Former names: Fox Kids Play; Jetix Play; Playhouse Disney

Links
- Website: tv.disney.ro/ce-este-la-tv/disney-junior

Disney Jr. is a British-managed Romanian pay television preschool channel owned by The Walt Disney Company Limited in London. It was launched on 1 June 2011 as a programming block called Disney Junior Pė Disney Channel and is currently a channel since 1 March 2012. Playhouse Disney was rebranded as Disney Junior on 1 June 2011. It is the kids-aimed-2–7 programming block on Disney Channel. Every show on the channel is dubbed by Ager Film Studio.

== Logos ==
2009-2011

2019-2024

2024-present

== See also ==
- Disney Channel (Romania)
