= Jennifer Stone =

American actress and nurse (born 1993)

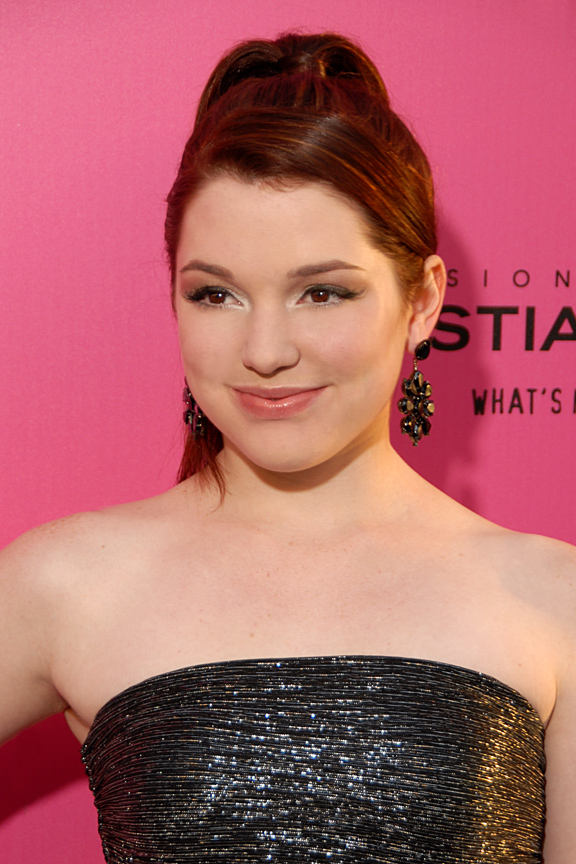
- Stone attending "The 6th Annual Hollywood Style Awards" in Beverly Hills in October 2009
- Born: February 12, 1993 (age 33); Arlington, Texas, U.S.
- Education: Glendale Community College (ASN); Azusa Pacific University (BSN)
- Occupations: Actress; nurse; podcaster; social media personality
- Years active: 2003–2019; 2026 (actress); 2021–present (nurse, social media personality and podcaster)

Jennifer Stone (born February 12, 1993) is an American actress, podcaster, social media personality, and nurse. As a child actor, she became known for playing Harper Finkle on the Disney Channel sitcom Wizards of Waverly Place (2007–2012). She also had roles in the comedy films Secondhand Lions (2003) and Mean Girls 2 (2011).

After appearing in the Slash-produced film Nothing Left to Fear (2013), Stone took a hiatus from acting to pursue education. She returned as an adult, receiving critical praise for co-writing and starring in the independent film The In-Between (2019).

== Early life and education ==
Stone was born on February 12, 1993, in Tarrant County, Texas. She earned an Associate of Science in nursing from Glendale Community College and a Bachelor of Science in nursing from Azusa Pacific University. She studied nursing so that she could get a better understanding of her type 1 diabetes diagnosis, leaving acting in 2019.

== Career ==
Stone was first cast as Martha in Secondhand Lions, for which she received a Young Artist Award nomination. She recalls having recognized Michael Caine from Miss Congeniality only while on the set of Secondhand Lions. Stone also received a Young Artist Award nomination for her guest appearance on House, and guest appeared on Line of Fire and Without a Trace. In 2007, she joined the main cast of Disney's Wizards of Waverly Place as Harper. Stone notes Gilda Radner as one of her biggest influences.

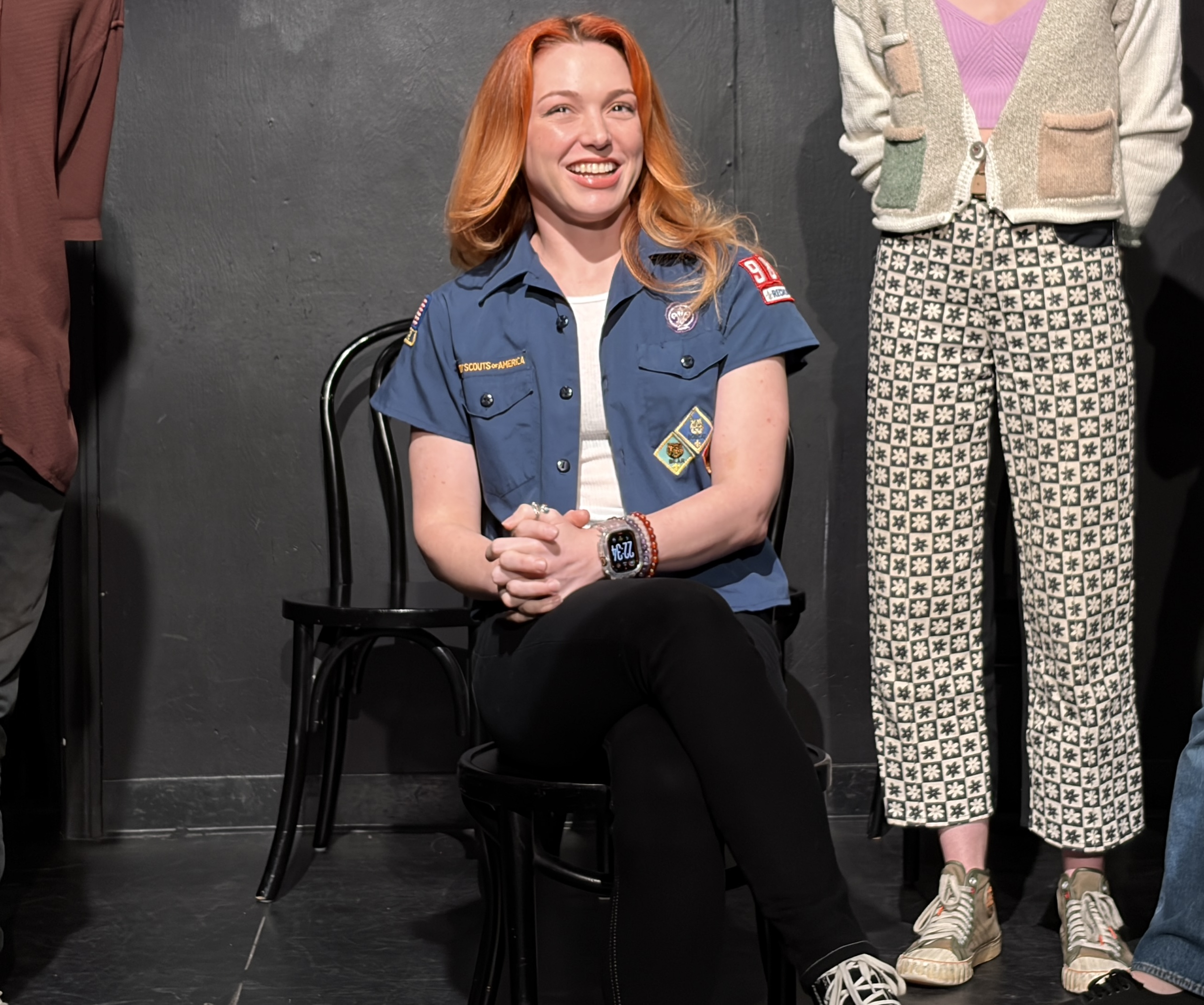
Stone during an Upright Citizens Brigade improv show in Los Angeles in 2026

In 2009, she had a voice role in the Disney Channel Original Movie Dadnapped. She also lent her voice to Phineas and Ferb as the voice of Amanda, Candace's daughter in the future in two episodes. In 2010, she played Harriet in the film Harriet the Spy: Blog Wars, based on the book of the same title by Louise Fitzhugh, which she later admitted she had not read before starring in the film. She later starred in the film Nothing Left to Fear and the television film High School Possession.

Stone is a registered nurse. In January 2018, she was interviewed on the Diabetes Connections podcast about her diabetes diagnosis, and how it has affected her life and career. In July 2019, Stone testified before the Senate for the JDRF, describing her experience with diabetes. Stone finished nursing school in December 2019, as news of the COVID-19 pandemic broke, and she mentioned in several interviews that she would be "joining the front lines" in the fight against the disease.

As of 2021, Stone made regular Instagram updates about her work in the hospital. As of August 2022, she was working in the emergency room at a hospital in Burbank, California. Also in 2022, she appeared as a spokesperson for Medtronic's insulin pen product.

== Filmography ==
=== Film ===
List of film roles
| Year | Title | Role | Notes |
|---|---|---|---|
| 2003 | Spy Kids 3-D: Game Over | Extra | Uncredited role |
| 2003 | Secondhand Lions | Martha | |
| 2011 | Fresh Studio | Maddie Rogers | |
| 2013 | Nothing Left to Fear | Mary | |
| 2019 | Santa Girl | Cassie Claus | |
| 2019 | The In-Between | Mads Olsen | Also writer and producer |

=== Television ===
| Year | Title | Role | Notes |
|---|---|---|---|
| 2004 | Line of Fire | Lily O'Donnell | Episode: "Mother and Child Reunion" |
| 2005 | House | Jessica Simms | Episode: "Heavy" |
| 2005 | Without a Trace | Brittany | Episode: "The Innocents" |
| 2007–2012 | Wizards of Waverly Place | Harper Finkle | Main role |
| 2009 | Dadnapped | Debbie (voice) | Television film |
| 2009 | Phineas and Ferb | Amanda (voice) | 2 episodes |
| 2009 | Wizards of Waverly Place: The Movie | Harper Finkle | Television film |
| 2010 | Harriet the Spy: Blog Wars | Harriet Welsch | Television film |
| 2011 | Mean Girls 2 | Abby Hanover | Television film |
| 2011–2012 | Generator Rex | Beverly Holiday (voice) | 2 episodes |
| 2012 | Pair of Kings | Priscilla | Episode: "Make Dirt, Not War" |
| 2013–2014 | Deadtime Stories | Babysitter | Main role |
| 2013 | Body of Proof | Hannah | Episode: "Lost Souls" |
| 2013 | The Wizards Return: Alex vs. Alex | Harper Finkle | Television film |
| 2014 | High School Possession | Chloe Mitchell | Television film |
| 2017 | Nasty Habits | Rachel | Episode: "The Smallest F*ck Up" |
| 2019 | Whisker Haven Tales with the Palace Pets | Zoe (voice) | Episode: "Go Away, Petite!" |
| 2026 | Wizards Beyond Waverly Place | Harper Finkle | Special guest star; 2 episodes |

== Awards and nominations ==
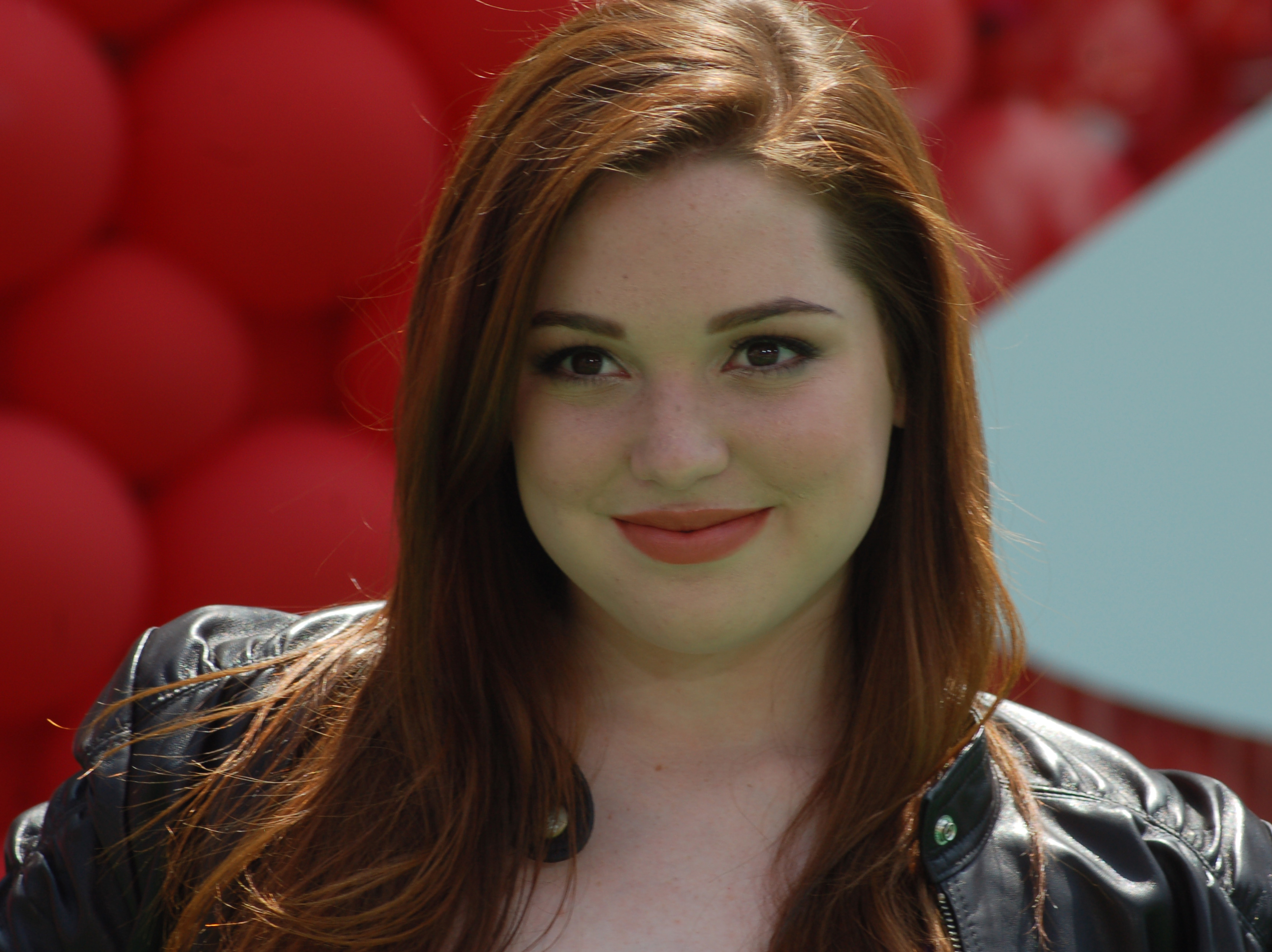
Stone at the Up premiere on May 16, 2009

| Year | Award | Category | Nominated work | Result | Refs |
|---|---|---|---|---|---|
| 2004 | Young Artist Awards | Best Performance in a Feature Film | Secondhand Lions | Nominated | |
| 2006 | Young Artist Awards | Best Performance in a Television Series – Guest Starring Young Actress | House | Nominated | |
| 2008 | Young Artist Awards | Best Young Ensemble Performance in a TV Series (with Selena Gomez, David Henrie and Jake T. Austin) | Wizards of Waverly Place | Nominated | |
| 2012 | Kids' Choice Awards | Favorite TV Sidekick | Wizards of Waverly Place | Nominated | |
| 2019 | Austin Revolution Film Festival | U.S. Feature | The In-Between | Won | |
| 2019 | Female Eye Film Festival | Best Debut Feature | The In-Between | Won | |
| 2019 | Twister Alley International Film Festival | Best Ensemble Feature Film | The In-Between | Won | |
| 2019 | Twister Alley International Film Festival | Best Feature Drama | The In-Between | Won | |
| 2019 | Women Texas Film Festival | Best Feature Film | The In-Between | Won | |
