= Disney Channel (Bulgaria) =

Bulgarian pay television channel

- Country: United Kingdom
- Broadcast area: Bulgaria
- Headquarters: 3 Queen Caroline Street, Hammersmith, London W6 9PE, United Kingdom

Programming
- Languages: Bulgarian (dubbing/subtitles); English
- Picture format: SDTV 576i, 16:9

Ownership
- Owner: The Walt Disney Company Limited; Disney Kids & Family (Disney International Operations)
- Sister channels: List: 24Kitchen; Disney Junior (Bulgaria); National Geographic; Nat Geo Wild; Star Channel; Star Crime; Star Life

History
- Launched: 1 April 1999; 27 years ago (as Fox Kids); 1 January 2005; 21 years ago (as Jetix); 19 September 2009; 17 years ago (as Disney Channel)
- Former names: Fox Kids (1999–2005); Jetix (2005–2009)

Links
- Website: tv.disney.bg

Disney Channel is a British-managed Bulgarian pay television kids' channel, owned and operated by The Walt Disney Company. It was launched on 19 September 2009, replacing Jetix Eastern Europe. It shares its feed with Disney Channel Romania.

== History ==
The channel was launched in April 1999 as Fox Kids Central and Eastern Europe, following the 1996 launch of Fox Kids UK. The network's programming consisted mostly of older shows from Fox Children's Productions, which were aired in the US Fox Kids block, and shows from its co-owners, Saban International. Saban also supplied the channel with the series from the Marvel Animated Universe. Most Bulgarian operators made it available in 1999, often with Russian audio. Later, they mostly switched to the English track.

In 2000, Bulgarian free-to-air television channel bTV, then owned by News Corporation, launched a Fox Kids-branded block which aired on weekday afternoons and weekend mornings. In 2004 the Fox Kids block was renamed to Jetix. It was removed in 2008, although bTV still airs shows from Jetix, but not part of any block.

In 2001, The Walt Disney Company announced its intention to buy Fox Kids' majority owner, Fox Family Worldwide, along with Haim Saban's entertainment companies, which in turn partly owned Fox Family. In 2004, Fox Kids Europe, Fox Kids Latin America and Disney announced to brand all their channels under one brand, titled Jetix. Jetix began as a block on Fox Kids and would eventually rebrand on 1 January 2005.

After Robert Iger became Disney's new chief executive officer, the company started to rename some of its properties in order to focus more on its key brands like Disney and ABC. Disney announced in December 2008 to fully purchase Jetix Europe and have it delisted from the Euronext. Most Jetix channels were changed over to Disney XD, but on 26 May 2009, Disney announced that the Jetix channel in certain countries (namely Hungary, Romania, the Czech Republic, Slovakia and Bulgaria) would be renamed to Disney Channel instead, marking that channel's first introduction in these countries. The channel finally rebranded to Disney Channel on 19 September 2009.

On 1 June 2011, the channel was rebranded to the American graphical package, with the app logo. On 21 July 2014 the channel was rebranded with the German graphical package. On 11 August 2015 Disney Channel Eastern Europe changed its aspect ratio from 4:3 to 16:9.

== Logos ==
1999–2005

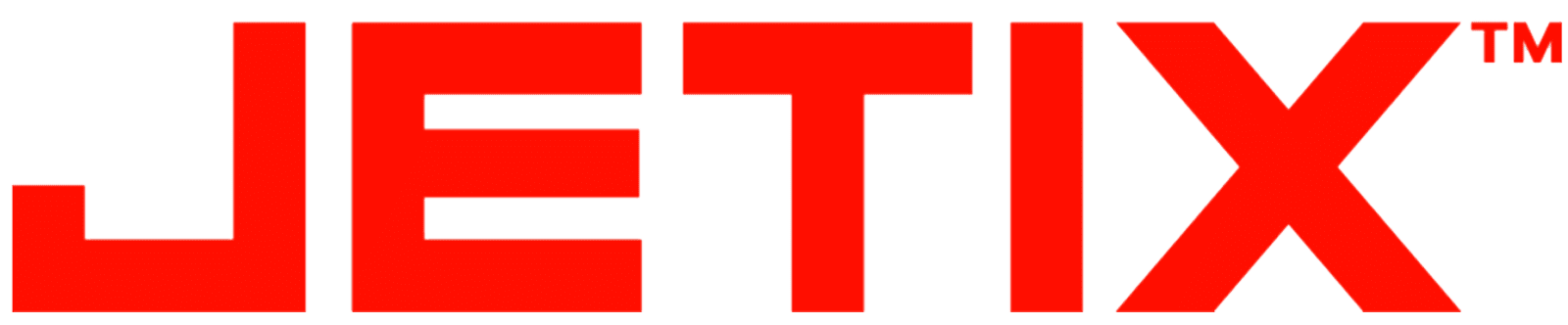
2005–2009

2009–2011

2011–2014

2014–2017

2017–2022

2022–present

== See also ==
- Disney Jr. (Bulgaria)
- Disney Channel (Romania)
- Disney Jr. (Romania)
