= Disney Channel (Romania) =

- Country: United Kingdom
- Broadcast area: Romania and Moldova
- Headquarters: 3 Queen Caroline Street, Hammersmith, London W6 9PE, United Kingdom

Programming
- Languages: Romanian (dubbing/subtitles); English
- Picture format: HDTV 1080i; SDTV 576i (downscaled)

Ownership
- Owner: The Walt Disney Company Limited; Disney Kids & Family (Disney Entertainment)
- Sister channels: BabyTV; Disney Junior; National Geographic; Nat Geo Wild

History
- Launched: 1 April 1999; 27 years ago (as Fox Kids); 1 January 2005; 21 years ago (as Jetix); 19 September 2009; 17 years ago (as Disney Channel)
- Former names: Fox Kids (1999–2005); Jetix (2005–2009)

Links
- Website: tv.disney.ro

Disney Channel is a British-managed Romanian pay television channel owned by The Walt Disney Company Limited in London.

It broadcasts for preschoolers and kids, and also for teenagers and adults, from series and movies.

It shares its feed with Disney Channel Bulgaria. Disney Channel was launched in Romania on 1 April 1999 as Fox Kids, it changed its name to Jetix on 1 January 2005 and finally to the current name on 19 September 2009.

== History ==
After Disney XD was successfully launched on 13 February 2009 in the United States, the Disney-ABC Television Group re-branded Jetix France to Disney XD on 1 April 2009 and it was expected to be rolled out to other European countries in that same year. In May, Disney announced that Jetix in certain countries (namely Hungary, Romania, the Czech Republic, Slovakia and Bulgaria) would be rebranded as Disney Channel, marking that channel's first introduction in those countries. The change occurred on 19 September 2009.

In May 2010, Disney Channel Eastern Europe was removed from Hot Bird satellite. Advertising is shown in Romanian and Bulgarian; the voices in the ads are only heard on the respective audio tracks.

On 1 September 2022, Disney Channel Romania was rebranded, but Promo as only Time, Later the Localised promo text was added.

== Logos ==
1999–2005

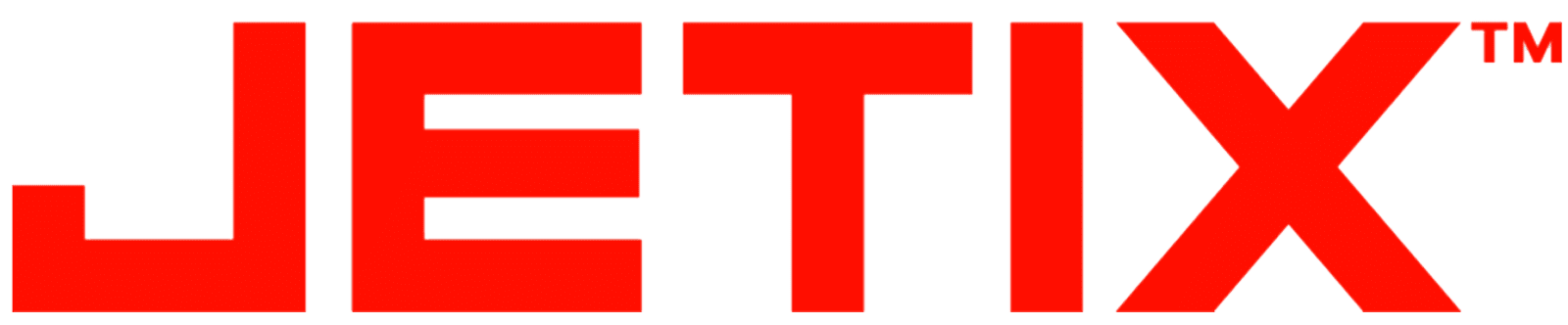
2005–2009

2009–2011

2011–2014

2014–2017

2017–2022

2022–present

== See also ==
- Disney Jr. (Romania)
- Disney Channel (Bulgaria)
- Disney Jr. (Bulgaria)
