= Disney Channel (Czech Republic) =

Czech paradox cable/satellite TV channel

- Country: United Kingdom
- Broadcast area: Czech Republic; Hungary; Slovakia
- Headquarters: 3 Queen Caroline Street, Hammersmith, London W6 9PE, United Kingdom

Programming
- Language: English; Czech (dubbing/subtitles); Hungarian (dubbing/subtitles)
- Picture format: SDTV 576i, 16:9

Ownership
- Owner: The Walt Disney Company Limited; Disney Kids & Family (Disney Entertainment)

History
- Launched: September 2001; 24 years ago (as Fox Kids); 1 January 2005; 21 years ago (as Jetix); 19 September 2009; 16 years ago (as Disney Channel)
- Former names: Fox Kids (2000–2005); Jetix (2005–2009)

Links
- Website: tv.disney.cz

Disney Channel is a British-managed children's television channel owned and operated by The Walt Disney Company Limited. It broadcasts in the Czech Republic, Slovakia and Hungary, the latter sharing its feed with a Hungarian audio track. It was previously known as Fox Kids, and later as Jetix. It was first launched in Hungary in September 2000, and was later expanded to the Czech Republic and Slovakia in February 2001.

== History ==
After Disney XD successfully launched on 13 February 2009 in the US, Disney-ABC Television Group rolled it out to France on 1 April 2009 and it was expected to be rolled out to other European territories in 2009. In 2009, Disney announced that the Jetix channel in certain countries (namely the Czech Republic, Slovakia, Romania, Hungary, Romania and Bulgaria) would be rebranded as Disney Channel, marking that channel's first introduction in these countries. The channel was replaced on 19 September 2009.

On 3 May 2011, Disney Channel Central Europe started using the same and updated on-air logo as in the United States, along with several other Disney Channels across Europe, completing its transitional rebrand to the new look. The new logo has debuted on the Czech feed first, prior to appearing on the UK, German, French, Dutch and Spanish feeds. The Playhouse Disney programming block was rebranded to Disney Junior in the Czech Republic and Slovakia on 1 June 2011.

Since 2012, most of the channel's promos are being produced in widescreen. In December 2012, Disney Channel Central Europe has adapted the same on-air presentation and graphics, with minor differences, used by Disney Channel UK. This update has been fully complete in spring.

In June 2014, Disney Channel Central Europe adapted the new logo currently used by Disney Channel Germany. It started broadcasting in 16:9 widescreen format from 29 January 2015.

== Logos ==
2000–2005

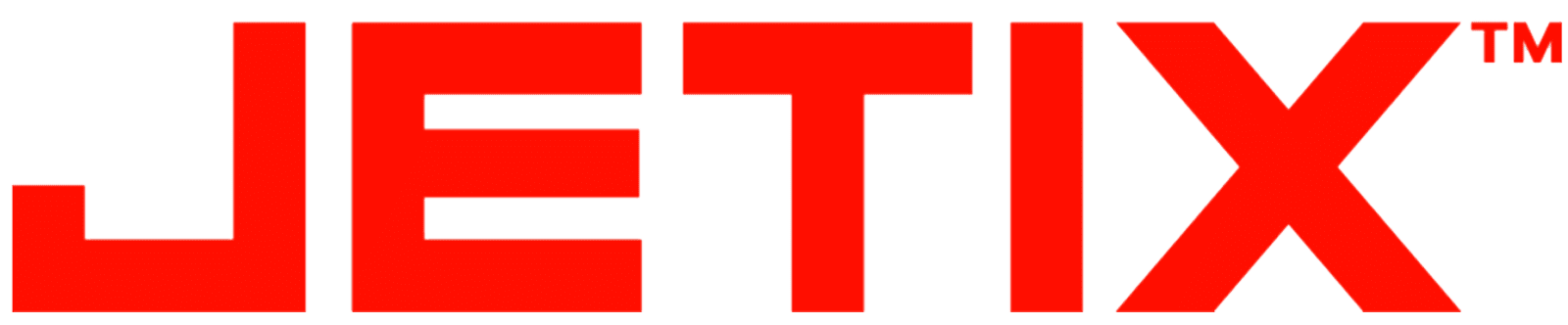
2005–2009

2009–2011

2011–2014

2014–2017

2017–2022

2022–present
