= Disney Channel (Hungary) =

- Country: United Kingdom
- Broadcast area: Hungary; Czech Republic; Slovakia
- Headquarters: 3 Queen Caroline Street, Hammersmith, London W6 9PE, United Kingdom

Programming
- Languages: English; Hungarian (dubbing/subtitles); Czech (dubbing/subtitles)
- Picture format: SDTV 576i, 16:9

Ownership
- Owner: The Walt Disney Company Limited; Disney Kids & Family (Disney Entertainment)

History
- Launched: September 2000; 25 years ago (as Fox Kids); 1 January 2005; 21 years ago (as Jetix); 19 September 2009; 16 years ago (as Disney Channel)
- Former names: Fox Kids; Jetix

Links
- Website: tv.disney.hu

Disney Channel (on-air known as Disney Csatorna) is a British-managed Hungarian pay television channel, owned and operated by The Walt Disney Company. It is aimed at children and teens. It was previously known as Fox Kids, and later as Jetix.

The channel is broadcast in Hungary, the Czech Republic, and Slovakia, the two latter sharing its feed with a Czech audio track. It's currently the only Disney-branded TV channel in Hungary since the closure of Disney Junior in 2017.

== History ==
The channel launched in Hungary as Fox Kids in November 2000. While it was similar in programming and scheduling to the standard CEE feed, it was entirely localized in Hungarian and held its own space within the Astra 1F satellite. On 23 February 2001, the channel increased its coverage area to the Czech Republic and Slovakia with the addition of a Czech audio track to the channel. On 18 April 2004, Fox Kids launched Jetix as a programming block, and later, on 1 January 2005, the channel was rebranded as Jetix.

On 11 August 2008, Jetix started broadcasting a block of "Disney stars", featuring the series Kim Possible, Phineas and Ferb, American Dragon, Hannah Montana and later Wizards of Waverly Place. After Disney XD was launched on 19 February 2009 in the US, the Disney-ABC Television Group has started re-branding Jetix channels in all countries. However, in certain countries (including Hungary), Jetix was replaced by Disney Channel, marking that channel's introduction in these countries.

On 8 July 2009, Jetix started broadcasting promotional ads that announced the launch of Disney Channel in Hungary with the series Phineas and Ferb, Hannah Montana, JONAS, Kim Possible, American Dragon and Wizards of Waverly Place. Thus, Jetix was rebranded as Disney Channel on 19 September 2009.

On 21 July 2014, the channel adopted the new logo. The channel switched to 16:9 widescreen on 29 January 2015.

On 3 May 2011, Disney Channel Central Europe started using the same and updated on-air logo as in the United States, along with several other Disney Channels across Europe, completing its transitional rebrand to the new look. The new logo has debuted on the Czech feed first, prior to appearing on the UK, German, French, Dutch and Spanish feeds. The Playhouse Disney programming block was rebranded to Disney Junior in the Czech Republic and Slovakia on 1 June 2011.

Since 2012, most of the channel's promos are being produced in widescreen. In December 2012, Disney Channel Central Europe has adapted the same on-air presentation and graphics, with minor differences, used by Disney Channel UK. This update has been fully complete in spring.

In June 2014, Disney Channel Central Europe adapted the new logo currently used by Disney Channel Germany. It started broadcasting in 16:9 widescreen format from 29 January 2015.

On 1 July 2015, Disney Junior launched in Hungary, but closed on 5 December 2017.

== Logos ==
2000–2005

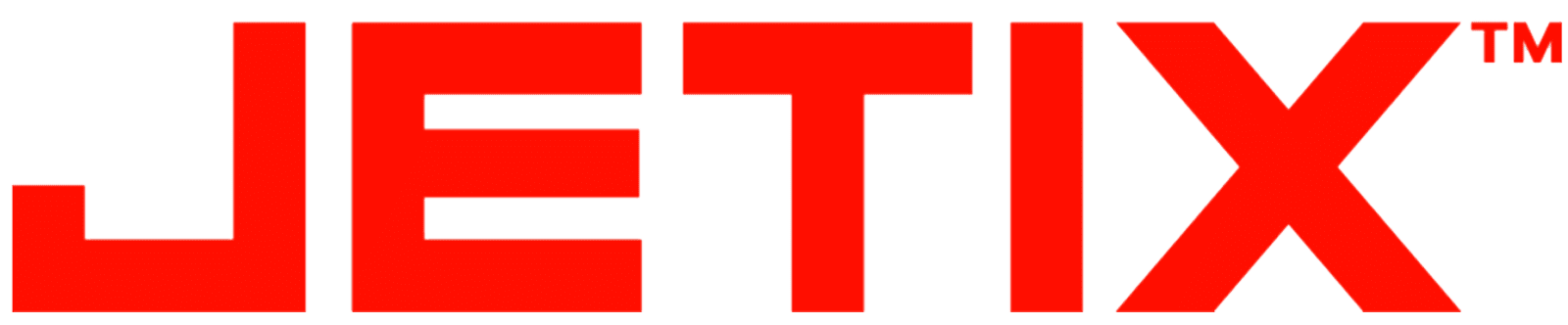
2005–2009

2009–2011

2011–2014

2014–2017

2017–2022

2022–present
