= The Ghost and Molly McGee =

American animated comedy television series

- Genre: Supernatural fantasy; Musical; Buddy comedy
- Created by: Bill Motz and Bob Roth
- Showrunners: Bill Motz and Bob Roth
- Directed by: Eden Riegel (dialogue)
- Voices of: Ashly Burch; Dana Snyder; Jordan Klepper; Sumalee Montano; Michaela Dietz; Lara Jill Miller
- Theme music composer: Michael Kramer; Allie Feder
- Opening theme: "The Ghost and Molly McGee Main Title Theme" by Ashly Burch and Dana Snyder
- Composers: Michael Kramer (score); Rob Cantor (songs)
- Country of origin: United States
- Original language: English
- No. of seasons: 2
- No. of episodes: 41 (78 segments)

Production
- Executive producers: Steve Loter; Bill Motz and Bob Roth
- Producer: Britta Reitman
- Editors: Tony Molina (season 1); John Royer (season 2)
- Running time: 22 minutes
- Production company: Disney Television Animation

Original release
- Network: Disney Channel
- Release: October 1, 2021 – January 13, 2024

The Ghost and Molly McGee is an American animated supernatural musical buddy comedy television series created by Bill Motz and Bob Roth that aired on Disney Channel from October 1, 2021, to January 13, 2024. The series features the voices of Ashly Burch, Dana Snyder, Jordan Klepper, Sumalee Montano, Michaela Dietz, and Lara Jill Miller.

A sneak peek of the show's theme song was first shown on May 1, 2021, during the network's "Halfway to Halloween" event. On August 31, 2021, more than a month before it premiered, the series was renewed for a second and final season, which premiered on April 1, 2023.

== Synopsis ==
In the Human Realm, 13-year-old Irish-Thai American optimist Molly McGee arrives in her new hometown of Brighton, only to discover that her new house is already occupied by a grumpy ghost named Scratch, who curses Molly in an attempt to scare her away, but this backfires, forever binding him to her. While initially antagonistic toward her, Scratch slowly opens up to Molly, and their friendship strengthens while going on wacky adventures and misadventures together and helping each other through the good and bad in their lives (and afterlives).

In the second and final season, Scratch becomes the new Chairman of the Ghost Council, and a ghost-hunting family called the Chens moves in across from the McGees, who plan to keep the existence of ghosts a secret from the Chens while trying to maintain their friendship.

== Characters ==
Main cast and characters
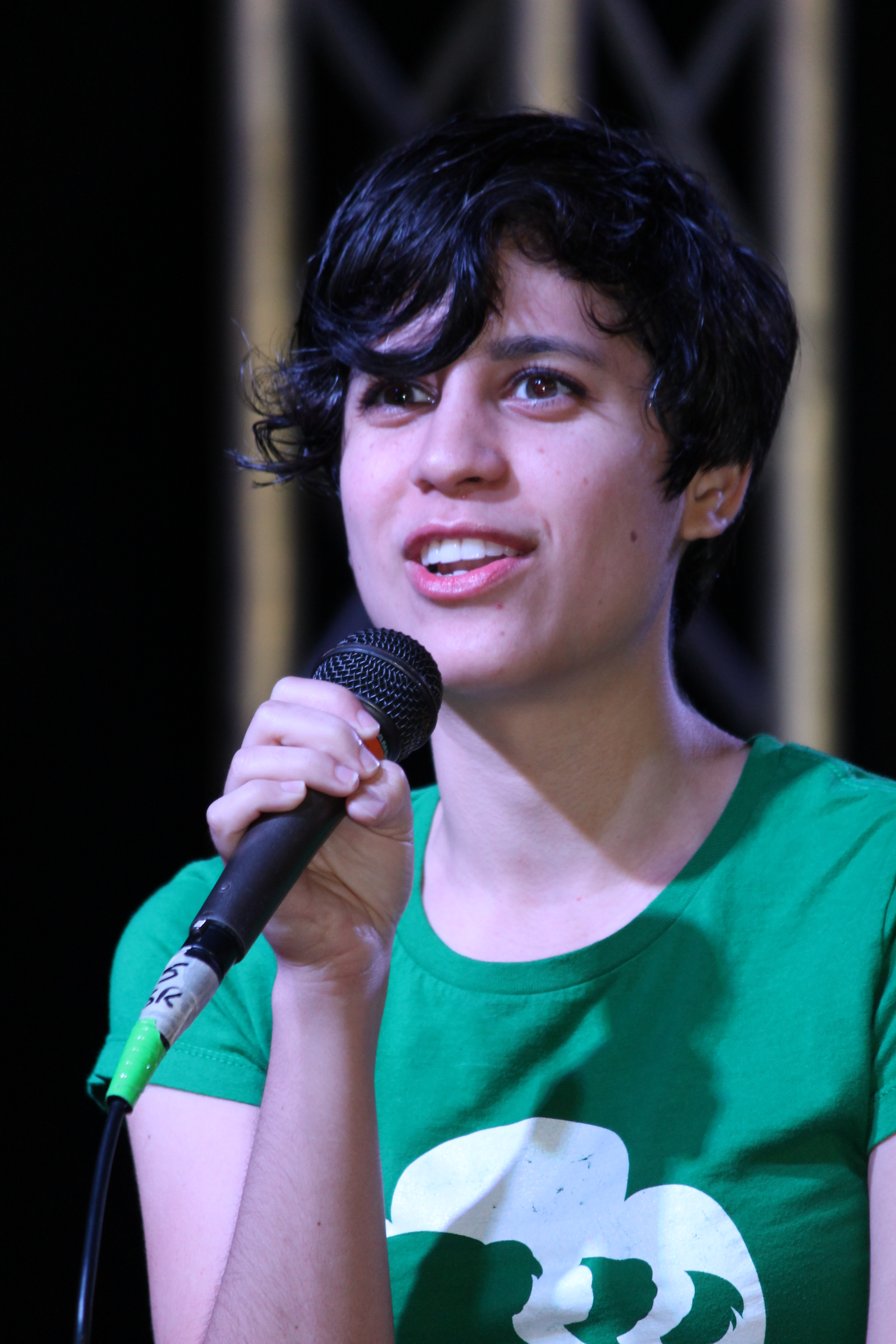
Burch (Molly)

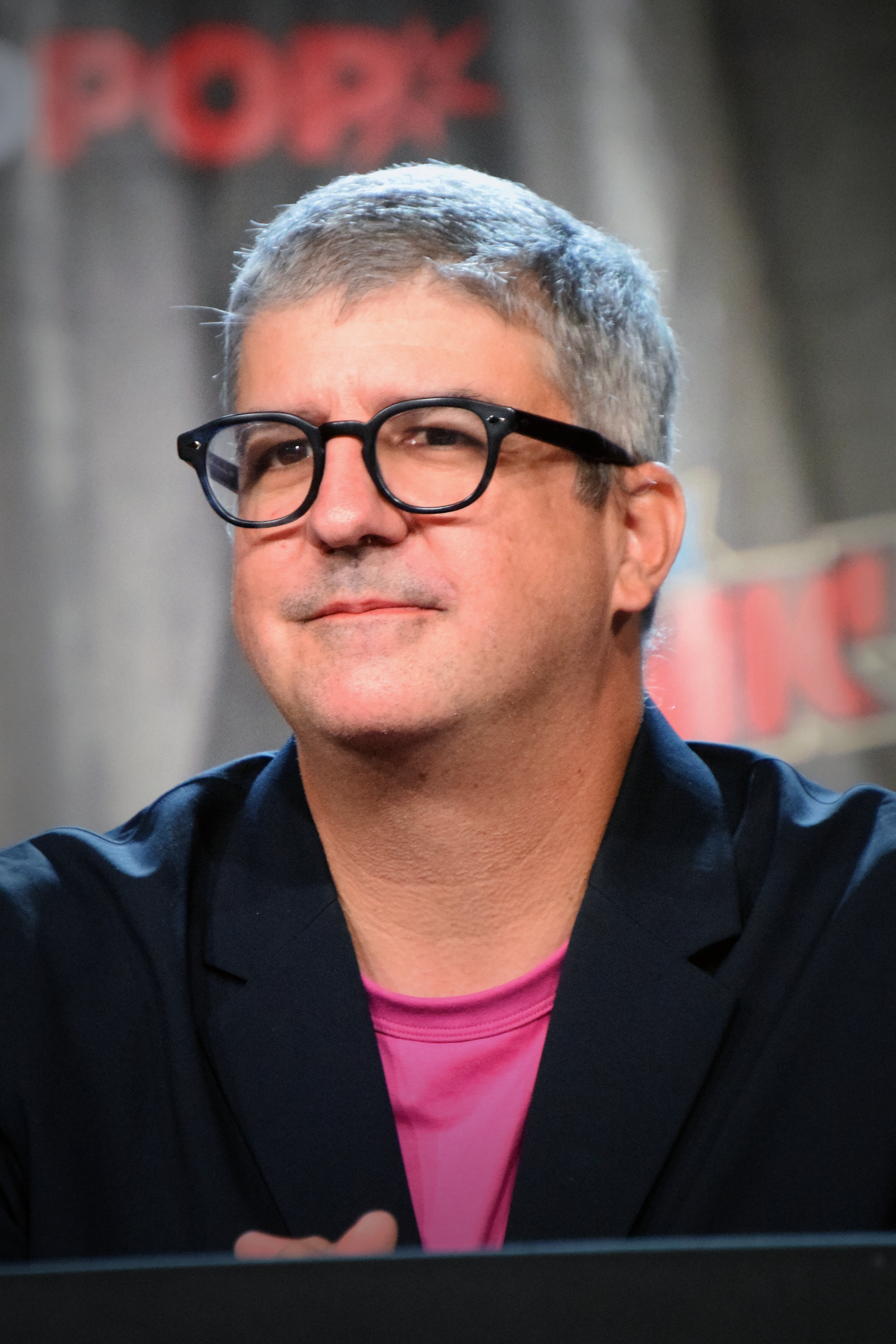
Snyder (Scratch)

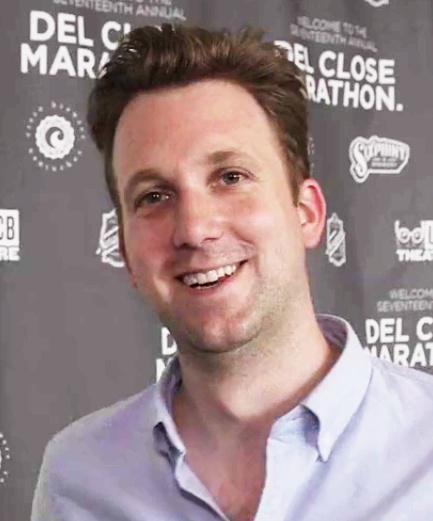
Klepper (Pete)

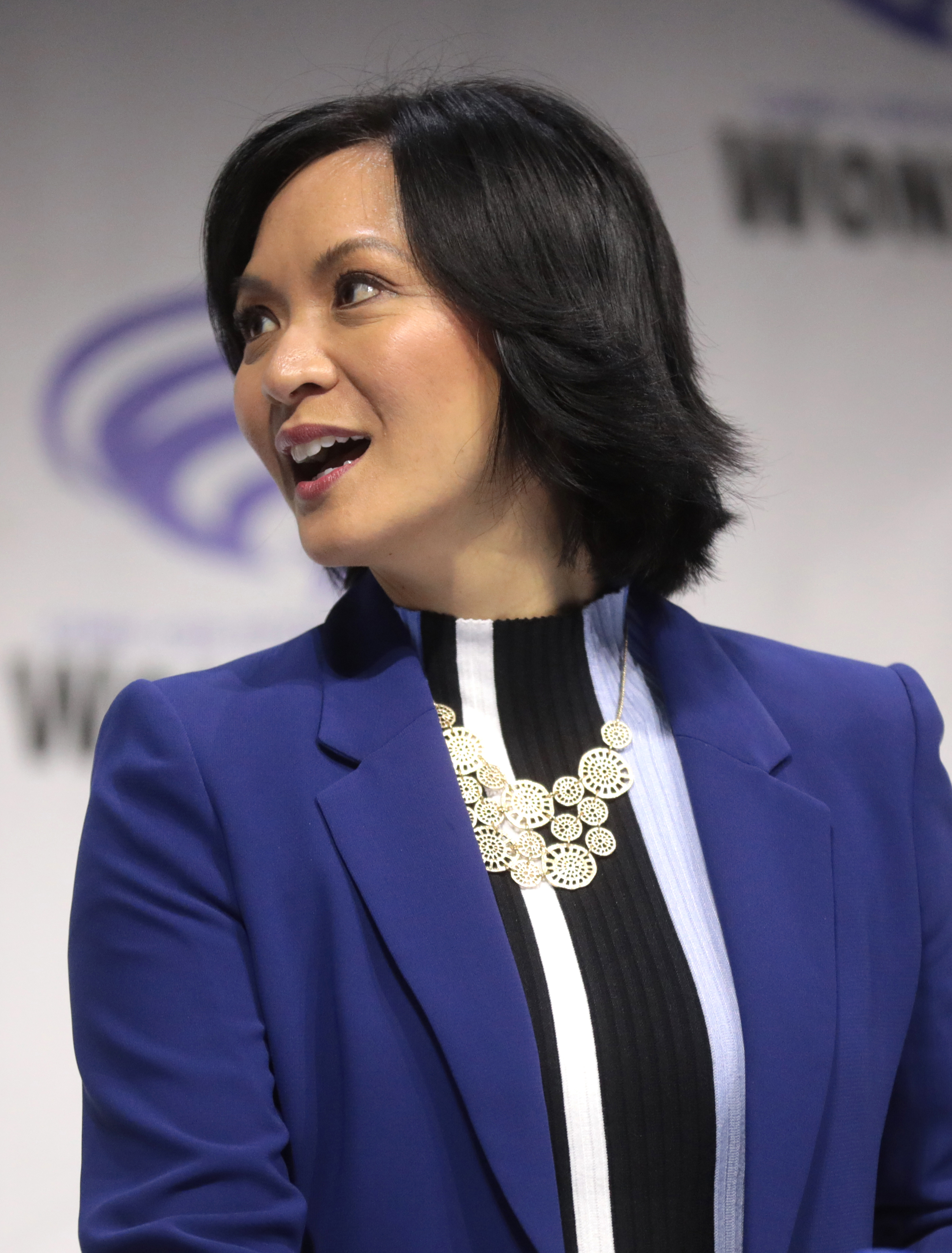
Montano (Sharon and Grandma Nin)

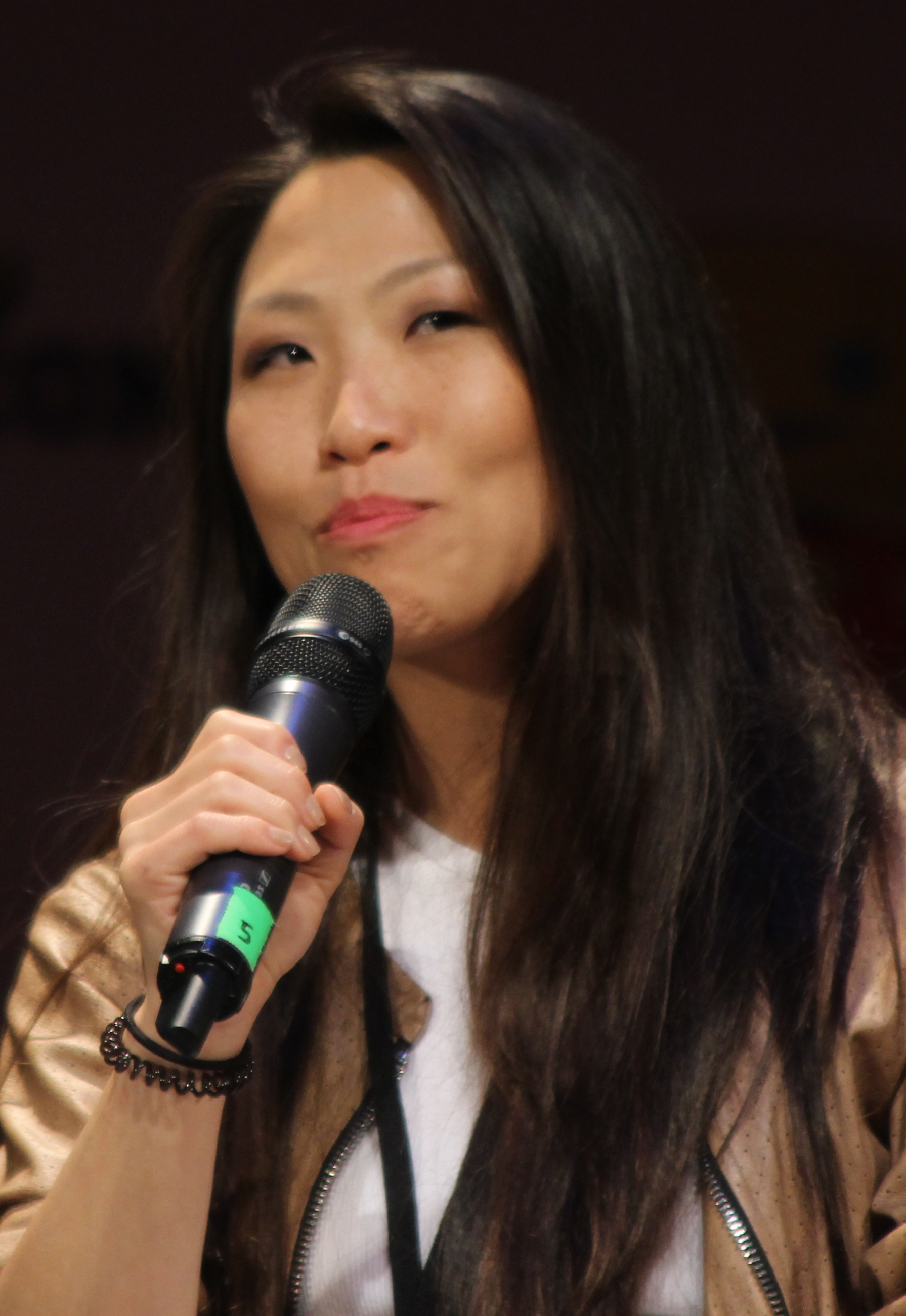
Dietz (Darryl)

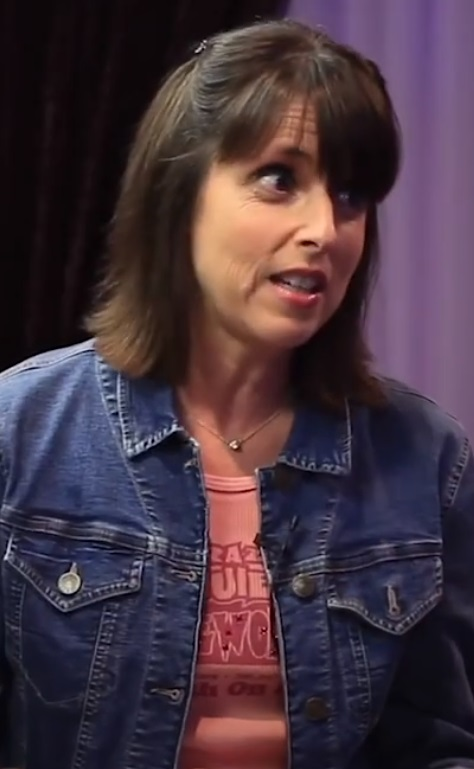
Miller (Libby)

=== McGee family ===
- Molly McGee (voiced by Ashly Burch) is an optimistic 13-year-old Irish-Thai American girl who lives to make the world a better place, describing it as "enhappifying". Her father, Pete, is a city planner, forcing her family to move a lot throughout the course of her lifetime, until they finally decided to settle down in their "forever home" in Brighton, where she meets Scratch. She later makes a human friend at school named Libby, who eventually learns about Scratch's existence in the episode "Scratch the Surface". She also has a crush on Ollie, a neighboring boy around her age, who reciprocates her feelings, and is in a family of ghost hunters. She eventually helps him learn to trust ghosts in the episode "Frightmares on Main Street". In the Season 1 finale, "Molly vs. the Ghost World", Molly discovers how to separate her spirit from her body as a wraith. In that form, she is able to bring joy to anything she touches in the Ghost World. In the episode "Home is Where the Haunt Is", the curse tying her and Scratch together is broken (as her family temporarily moved out of the house), but the two still stay good friends. In "A Period Piece", it is revealed that Molly wears mascara as makeup appears to be ruined when she started crying and makes her confession, though the episode shows her putting on make up in an attempt to be more adult in front of her friends, so she is just wearing mascara in that episode.
- Pete McGee (voiced by Jordan Klepper) is Molly and Darryl's Irish father, and Sharon's husband. He is an urban planner and former ice skater. Pete married Sharon with an unofficial wedding. He tends to act dimwitted at times but means well.
- Sharon McGee (née Suksai) (voiced by Sumalee Montano) is Molly and Darryl's Thai mother and Pete's wife. She married Pete with an unofficial wedding. Sharon originally had a tense relationship with her mother, Grandma Nin, but they began to get along, starting in the episode "The Best of Nin-tensions". Her income comes from doing gigs from an app named Gig-Pig. She dreams of becoming an artist.
- Grandma Nin Suksai (also voiced by Sumalee Montano) is Molly and Darryl's maternal grandmother, Sharon's mother and Pete's mother-in-law.
- Darryl McGee (voiced by Michaela Dietz) is Molly's mischievous younger brother. Darryl has a pet tarantula named Heidi Hairylegs and claims to get hook ups, calling himself "a man with many connections". After his sister, he is the second character seen to become a wraith, as shown in the episode "Double, Double, Darryl & Trouble".

=== Stein-Torres family ===
- Libby Stein-Torres (voiced by Lara Jill Miller) is Molly's best human friend. Libby is of Jewish and Argentine descent and has a love for turtles. She suffers from frequent slapstick comedy, as she is shown to be rather unlucky. Libby hides her head in her turtleneck collar when she is shy. She knows about historical people, as they are people that died a long time ago. Libby was unaware of Scratch's presence until the episode "Scratch the Surface", when she learned about his existence. Later on, she became friends with him after they worked together to save Molly when she got trapped in a compost machine.
- Leah Stein-Torres (voiced by Pamela Adlon) is Libby's mother, with whom she has a close bond. She is the "#1 fan" of her own daughter. Ms. Stein-Torres owns a bookstore called Book Marks the Spot.

=== Davenport family ===
- Andrea Davenport (/ˈɑːndriə/ AHN-dree-uh; voiced by Jules Medcraft) is Molly's rival turned self-proclaimed BFF. She is very sensitive about how her first name is pronounced and she is the most popular girl at school. Despite her success, she seems unhappy at times, desperately craving the attention of her busy parents. As the series progresses, Andrea is shown to be more caring of other people, such as "Home is Where the Haunt is", when she started a fund to save the McGees' house, considering Molly as her BFF, as well as "Davenport's on Demand", when she shut down her app after learning that it was threatening other businesses; and "Davenport's in Demise", when she learned that her online personality should be her true personality and that she should take a break from social media.
- Maxwell Davenport (voiced by Thomas Lennon) is the owner of a local department store and Andrea's conceited and self-entitled father who is obsessed with social media.
- Dorothea Davenport (voiced by Jessica Keenan Wynn) is Maxwell's wife and Andrea's mother.

=== Ghosts ===
- Scratch (voiced by Dana Snyder) is a grumpy and gluttonous ghost who accidentally cursed himself to be alongside Molly for all eternity. His job was to scare people as assigned by the Ghost Council (until "The Jig Is Up/Molly vs. The Ghost World"), but he liked spending his time being with Molly instead. Scratch glows a fluorescent cyan while visible but is able to become invisible, shift his appearance at will, and distort his surroundings, typically to scare humans. He also has the ability to teleport between the Human Realm and the Ghost Realm at will. In "Out of House and Home" and "Home is Where the Haunt Is", after the McGees are forced to leave the house, he and Molly are no longer cursed to stay together, but Scratch still stays with the McGees after they move back in. In Season 2, Scratch is named the new Chairman of the Ghost World due to Molly's actions in the Season 1 finale. He also has a ghost friend named Geoff, who annoys him at first, but Scratch eventually learns to like him. In the series finale, "The End", Scratch is revealed to be the wraith of a human named Todd Mortenson. He decides to return to his human life and travel the world, and reunites with his friend Adia Williams.
- The Ghost Council: The Ghost Realm's council who make sure ghosts in their homeworlds cause misery.
  - The Chairman is the main antagonist of Season 1 who is a ghostly chairman, taking inspiration from the Grim Reaper. He feeds on misery, and expects other ghosts to spread it for him. He was destroyed alongside the Flow of Failed Phantoms by Molly's joy during the Season one finale.
  - The Barrister Ghosts are major characters of the series who are in charge of making sure ghosts in the world maintain their jobs of causing misery in their cities. They did not introduce themselves by name prior to Season 2, before which Scratch was unaware they had names.
    - Lucretia (voiced by Grey Griffin) is a purple ghost who is one of the council's members.
    - Sir Alister (voiced by John DiMaggio) is a green ghost who is one of the council's members. In life, he yearned to play the lute professionally, which his father disapproved of.
    - Grimbella (voiced by Kari Wahlgren) is a greyish-lavender ghost and one of the council's members, who speaks with a British accent.
    - Bartholomew (voiced by Greg Baldwin) is a blue ghost and one of the council's members.
- Geoff (voiced by Eric Edelstein) is a goofy cyan ghost who is Scratch's best ghost friend. His running gag is him spelling his name. He has been in a long-term relationship with Jeff for 100 years.
- Ghost Bouncer (voiced by John DiMaggio) is the bouncer of the Haughty Hunts Club, a club that let ghosts in, if they're official members.
- Abraham Lincoln (voiced by Kelsey Grammer) is the 16th U.S. president, nicknamed "Honest Abe".
- Ezekiel "Tug" Tugbottom (voiced by Chris Diamantopoulos) is Sally's troublemaking younger brother, who took credit for her accomplishments until Molly, Libby and Scratch exposed the truth.
- Sally Tugbottom (voiced by Kerri Kenney-Silver) is Brighton's founder and Ezekiel's older sister. Sally has a pet bear.
- Franklin Roosevelt (voiced by John DiMaggio) is the 32nd U.S. president and Theodore Roosevelt's fifth cousin.
- Julius Caesar (voiced by Greg Baldwin) is the Roman general and statesman.
- Cleopatra (voiced by Grey Griffin) is the Egyptian queen of the Ptolemaic Kingdom.
- Jinx (voiced by Liza Koshy) is the secondary antagonist of Season 1 last two episodes, main antagonist of season 2 and Scratch's archenemy. She is a purple ghost who is a joy hunter sent by the Ghost Council to eliminate Molly. In Season 2, she continues to antagonize Scratch after the Chairman's demise, and in "Jinx vs. the Human World", she steals the Chairman's robe in order to take over herself. After trying to also conquer Brighton, she is defeated and sucked into the Chens' ghost canister.
- Jeff (voiced by Vincent Rodriguez III) is Geoff's "Afterlife Partner". He is known to be highly protective of Geoff, and threatens those who would harm him whether physically or emotionally.
- Sobgoblins (voiced by Grey Griffin) are a species of ghost that feed on misery and sadness. They are destroyed in "Jinx vs. The Human World", when Molly feeds them too much joy, which causes them to explode.

=== Chen family ===
The Chen family are a Chinese-American family of ghost hunters introduced in Season 2.

- Oliver "Ollie" Chen (voiced by Alan Lee) is Molly's boyfriend and the older brother of June. Ollie is the research specialist of their ghost hunting. He is also a vegetarian. He found out about Scratch's existence in "I Wanna Dance with Some-Ollie", and befriended him after realizing that not all ghosts are bad in "Frightmares on Main Street".
- Juniper "June" Chen (voiced by Sue Ann Pien) is Ollie's younger sister and an inventor. She is autistic, as is her voice actress, and has a habit of brutal honesty. She is the technology specialist of her family and uses her many inventions to aid in their ghost-hunting. "Frightmares on Main Street" hints that she may have caught on to Ollie's secret friendship with Scratch, and the power Scratch may possess. She eventually found out about Scratch's existence in "Welcome to NecroComic-Con" and has developed a more positive view of ghosts since then.
- Esther Chen (voiced by Stephanie Sheh) is Ollie and June's mother. Esther is in charge of the video and graphics with their ghost hunting.
- Ruben Chen (voiced by Leonard Wu) is Ollie and June's father. Ruben is the lead investigator of their ghost hunting, having taken up the profession after an encounter with Geoff in his childhood.

=== Other Brighton citizens ===
- Sheela (voiced by Aparna Nancherla) is Molly's geeky friend.
- Kat (voiced by Eden Riegel) is Molly's sweet pink-haired friend.
- Miss Lightfoot (voiced by Julia Jones) is Molly's constantly nervous teacher.
- Mrs. Roop (voiced by Jane Lynch) is a teacher at Brighton Middle School. She has a wife, Pam, mentioned in "No Good Deed".
- Patty (voiced by Jenifer Lewis) is an elder resident who quickly befriends Molly.
- Mayor Brunson (voiced by Patton Oswalt) is Brighton's mayor.
- Principal O'Connor (voiced by Eugene Byrd) is Brighton Middle School's principal. Though well-meaning, his uptight nature does not endear him to the students, and he is frequently made the butt of Darryl's pranks.
- Irving the Illusionist (voiced by Trevor Devall) is a street magician who gets a thrill out of bewildering any passerby who sees him with his sleight of hand which mainly involves cards, coins and confetti.
- Weird Larry (voiced by Trevor Devall) is a pawn shop owner whose eccentric ways tend to freak out anybody on account that he tends to ask for help with the uncomfortable favors such as the time he needed help finding and catching his beloved runaway pet skunk Vera.
- Joanie Pataky (voiced by Grey Griffin) is Brighton's news reporter.
- Bobby Daniels (voiced by Danny Trejo)
- Adia Williams (voiced by Kimberly Brooks) was Scratch's friend when he was alive. In the series finale, she is introduced when Molly contacts her via a video call. In the final moments of the series, Adia reunites with Scratch/Todd after he returns to life.

=== Guest stars ===
- Howlin' Harriet (voiced by Eden Riegel) appears in "Howlin' Harriet".
- Tammy Myers (voiced by Chandler Kinney) appears in "The (Un)natural".
- Kenny Star (voiced by Tom Kenny) appears in "Getting the Band(shell) Back Together" and "Kenny's Falling Star".
- Greta Gerwig (voiced by herself) appears in "Hooray for Mollywood!".
- Uncle Ted (voiced by Yuri Lowenthal) appears in "Mazel Tov, Libby!".
- Eva Hernandez (voiced by Alanna Ubach) appears in "The Turnip Twist".
- Dianne (voiced by Yvette Nicole Brown) appears in "The Turnip Twist/All Systems No" and "Web of Lies/Kenny's Falling Star".
- Sonia Davis (voiced by Alanna Ubach) appears in "Ice Princess".
- Billy McGee (voiced by John DiMaggio) appears in "Twin Trouble".
- Jilly McGee (voiced by Marieve Herington) appears in "Twin Trouble".
- Totes (voiced by Sumalee Montano) appears in "Goat Your Own Way".
- Pango (voiced by D'Arcy Carden) appears in "Scare Tactics".
- Reggie (voiced by Sean Giambrone) appears in "The Internship".
- Candace Green (voiced by Natasha Rothwell) appears in "Out of House and Home/Home is Where the Haunt Is".
- Lord Doom (voiced by W. Earl Brown) appears in "A Doll to Die For/The (After)life of the Party".
- Blair (voiced by Kimberly J. Brown) appears in "The Unhaunting of Brighton Video/100% Molly McGee".
- JR (voiced by Jim Rash) appears in "Like Father Like Libby/Dance Dad Revolution".
- Calvin Redtop (voiced by Tony Hale) appears in "Kenny's Falling Star".
- Rad Pham (voiced by Andrew Phung) appears in "Let's Play Turnipball!", "The Ghost IS Molly McGee" and "Fit to Print".
- Winnie Fiama (voiced by Lennon Parham) appears in "Fit to Print".

== Episodes ==
=== Series overview ===
Season	Segments	Episodes	Originally released	
Season	Segments	Episodes	First released	Last released
1	40	20	October 1, 2021	July 9, 2022
2	38	21	April 1, 2023	January 13, 2024

=== Season 1 (2021–22) ===
No. overall	No. in season	Title	Directed by	Written by	Storyboarded by	Original release date	Prod. code	U.S. viewers (millions)
1	1	"The Curse"	Stephen Heneveld	Bill Motz & Bob Roth	Kat Ruzics	October 1, 2021	101	0.34
1	1	"First Day Frights"	Sam King	Bill Motz & Bob Roth	Steve Hirt	October 1, 2021	101	0.34
The McGee family moves into a decrepit house in their new hometown of Brighton that just so happens to be inhabited by Scratch, one of the worst ghosts in the Ghost Realm. Molly, the daughter, immediately "befriends" him who in his anger accidentally curses her so that he is forever tied to her. He tries to scare the family out of the house so that the curse can be broken, but Molly convinces the family to stay. Taking the advice of her Grandma Nin, she makes a Sal Phra Phum for Scratch who graciously accepts it under the condition he be fed. In the Ghost Realm, the chairman notices that Brighton's misery gauge went down. Molly is nervous about her first day at her new school, which Scratch tries to take advantage of, but she throws caution to the wind. She ends up upsetting influencer Andrea Davenport after mispronouncing her name twice (Note: As /ˈændriə/ AN-dree-uh instead of /ˈɑːndriə/ AHN-dree-uh.) and becomes a pariah alongside similar student Libby. When Molly refuses to back down, Scratch loses his temper; Andrea accidentally sees this and faints. Molly tries to rush Andrea to the nurse's office, but Scratch reveals Molly with the unconscious Andrea to everyone in the school. Shocked at the sight of Molly holding Andrea's body, everyone begins to insult her, but Scratch gains empathy and possesses Andrea's body, making a declaration that people can pronounce her name however they want and that Molly and Libby deserve better treatment. Molly claims Scratch does care about her, much to his chagrin.
2	2	"Howlin' Harriet"	Sam King	Story by : Charley Feldman; Written by : Charley Feldman & Sammie Crowley	Megan Fisher	October 2, 2021	102	0.29
2	2	"The (Un)natural"	Stephen Heneveld	Story by : Bill Motz & Bob Roth; Written by : Bill Motz & Bob Roth and Katie Greenway	Noel Belknap, Johnny Castuciano, Cheyenne Curtis & Ryan Gillis	October 2, 2021	102	0.29
Molly wants to have a human best friend and filters it down to Kat, Sheela, and Libby, who are all Wilder-Scouts. She decides to camp with them while Scratch deals with Geoff, a goofy ghost who claims to be his friend. On a camping trip, Molly seems to favor Sheela and Kat while Libby clumsily meanders through the woods. At night, Libby tells the story of Howlin' Harriet. Scratch decides to scare the girls until the real Howlin' Harriet appears looking for her missing toes. Molly and Libby make toes for her and she leaves satisfied. Afterwards, Molly and Libby become best friends. Molly supports her school baseball team the Lemmings, who are terrible. She decides to be their primary supporter and joins their team. She turns out to be just as bad and when the opposing team insults her, Scratch uses his powers to make the Lemmings win. She is at first upset, but Scratch convinces her to go along with it, even though the team still has no spirit. For the last game, Molly decides to not use Scratch and the ball is hit, only for it to fly and be caught by Libby (with her mouth). Molly succeeds in raising her team's spirits while Scratch scares the opposing team's lead player to meet his daily scare quota.
3	3	"Getting the Band(shell) Back Together"	Sam King	Katie Greenway	Alayna Cabral	October 9, 2021 (Note: This episode was first released on Disney+ on October 6, 2021.)	103	0.28
3	3	"The Greatest Concert Ever"	Stephen Heneveld	Paul Chang	Tom Bernardo	October 9, 2021	103	0.28
The McGees go to a retirement home to do volunteer work. While there, Molly meets Patty, who recalls Brighton's bandshell, which was destroyed in a hurricane years ago and never rebuilt. Molly goes to the Mayor to pitch an idea to rebuild the bandshell, but they refuse, so she and Darryl collect money from everyone. They manage to get the materials, but not the labor and Molly holds a community day. No one appears, much to her disappointment, but the retirees eventually show up, causing the rest of the town to come and finish building the bandshell. Molly suddenly realizes she has no one to play at it. Molly decides to get country superstar Kenny Star to play at the bandshell and has even meticulously charted where his tour bus would be. Word gets out, forcing the McGees to respond. When they learn that the tour bus Molly charted belongs to Kenny Star's stunt double, the McGees head home dejected and forced to face the large crowd. Scratch gives into his empathy and finds a random tour bus, possesses the driver and races it back to Brighton. Just as Molly is about to tell everyone the bad news, Scratch arrives with the band, which turns out to be Darryl's favorite K-Pop group Atomic Pink. Everyone celebrates nonetheless.
4	4	"Mama's Gotta Hustle"	Sam King	Katie Greenway	Steve Hirt	October 16, 2021	104	0.29
4	4	"Hooray for Mollywood!"	Stephen Heneveld	Peter Limm	Tom Caulfield & Kat Ruzics	October 16, 2021	104	0.29
The McGees' van breaks down and they are unable to cover the costs. Sharon decides to take on odd jobs via an app called Gig Pig. Meanwhile, Pete and Darryl clean the basement and find a locked door and try to open it. Sharon gets small increments with each job. Eventually, Sharon manages to earn the required funds, but Pete and Darryl manage to open the door and discover it was the house's water heater, which they damage in the process and need to cover that cost too. Despite this, Sharon decides to continue her efforts with Gig Pig. Disappointed with a horror movie she just saw, Molly decides to make her own with Libby, Darryl, and Scratch. Their filming is less than stellar and they run into Andrea who offers to help them make their movie through her connections. They get a studio to work with, but Andrea continues to make changes that result in all of them getting booted out. Molly decides to allow Scratch to perform a real haunt as revenge and he scares off the entire crew, ending production. Darryl filmed the carnage and they edit it together as their horror film.
5	5	"Not So Honest Abe"	Sam King	Story by : Maiya Williams; Written by : Maiya Williams & Madison Bateman	Megan Fisher	October 23, 2021	105	0.35
5	5	"The Best of Nin-tensions"	Stephen Heneveld	Cynthia Furey	Johnny Castuciano	October 23, 2021	105	0.35
Molly has to put together a presentation about Abraham Lincoln. To convince Molly that he knows him, Scratch has Geoff pretend he is Lincoln. However, Geoff begins to feed false information to Molly, causing her grade to falter. Scratch manages to locate the real Lincoln (voiced by Kelsey Grammer), who has him come to terms with the fact that he cares about Molly's opinion of him and wants her to think he is cool. He brings Lincoln back and he helps Molly put together a presentation that grants her an A+. Scratch apologizes for lying to Molly, but then lies that he knows Albert Einstein when her science project is due. Molly invites Grandma Nin over and it quickly becomes apparent that there is tension between her and Sharon. Molly and Scratch try to mend their relationship, but things get worse. They are convinced that Nin is upset because Sharon eloped with Pete and try to have a traditional Thai wedding. This fails too, and Molly finally has them confront their feelings. Nin was upset that Sharon gave up on her dream to be an artist and even brought back her paintbrushes to remind her of her passion. Nin and Sharon make up and the former leaves on good terms with the latter.
6	6	"Mazel Tov, Libby!"	Sam King	Peri Segel	Alayna Cabral	October 30, 2021	106	0.33
6	6	"No Good Deed"	Stephen Heneveld	Story by : Jase Ricci & Sammie Crowley; Written by : Sammie Crowley	Tom Bernardo	October 30, 2021	106	0.33
Libby invites Molly to her Bat Mitzvah and becomes excited after seeing videos about the ceremony. However, when Molly arrives, she is surprised to find that it is very plain and that she is the only guest. With Scratch and her family's help, Molly spruces up the ceremony. Libby becomes unnerved by the abundance of guests. She tries to get through the night, but breaks down. Realizing that she was going against her friend's wishes, Molly drives everyone off by releasing bats (brought by Scratch based on his confusion over the ceremony), and she spends personal time with Libby and her family for the rest of the night. Darryl gets in trouble at school and asks Molly to teach him how to be good. Despite some trouble, things seem to work out. However, unbeknownst to Molly, Darryl uses her nice lessons as a way to get rid of the teachers by sending them to prison, not understanding that he needs to be nice to them too. Molly, Darryl, and Scratch go to rescue them, but the teachers, who were previously arguing, think they are doing a team-building exercise and manage to escape from prison, blissfully unaware of the trouble they were in. With the teachers on better speaking terms, Darryl does not learn his lesson, much to Molly's chagrin.
7	7	"The Turnip Twist"	Stephen Heneveld	Madison Bateman	Waymond Singleton	November 6, 2021	109	0.30
7	7	"All Systems No"	Johnny Castuciano	Sammie Crowley	Johnny Castuciano	November 6, 2021	109	0.30
In order to defeat Perfektborg in next month's issue of Midwest Monthly, the Mayor places Molly and Pete in charge of a Turnip Festival. Scratch is threatened by the Ghost Council that if the festival is a success he will be tossed to the Flow of Failed Phantoms. Eva, the inspector, ends up enjoying the festival, but when Scratch tells Geoff what will happen, he ruins Brighton's chances of winning, making Pete very upset, but saving Scratch from punishment. However, due to the festival going viral, tourists proceed to book their stay at Brighton's motel for next year, making Brighton's misery meter go down anyway. Molly and Scratch challenge each other to only say "yes" and "no" respectively for the whole day, via another curse. Meanwhile, the rest of the McGee family try to remove a bee from the house. Grandma Nin tells them that bees are good luck and therefore, they should not harm it, but that only results in more bees showing up. Molly and Scratch's bet backfires, leaving Molly miserable from constant compliance and forcing Scratch to abandon a Ghost Council opportunity. They swap for the rest of the day and return home where they help get rid of the bees.
8	8	"Monumental Disaster"	Johnny Castuciano & Sam King	Story by : Ricky Roxburgh & Paul Chang; Written by : Paul Chang	Steve Hirt	November 13, 2021	108	0.29
8	8	"Talent Show"	Stephen Heneveld & Sam King	Story by : Katie Greenway & Peter Limm; Written by : Peter Limm	Megan Fisher	November 13, 2021	108	0.29
Brighton praises its hero Ezekiel "Tug" Tugbottom by unveiling his statue. Molly meets his ghost and while impressed at first, she quickly discovers that he is an arrogant blowhard who in no way lives up to his heroic legacy. With Libby's help, she learns that Ezekiel was lazy and that his older sister Sally was the true hero of Brighton. As she exposes this information, Ezekiel attacks her and ends up destroying his own statue. Luckily, Scratch arrives with Sally's ghost and her bear to stop him. Inspired by the new information, the Mayor rightfully erects a statue of Sally instead. Libby accidentally signs up to perform in the school talent show when she was trying to sign up for the tech crew. Molly pushes her to go forward with a singing act, only to learn that she is terrible at it. Scratch wants her to fail miserably, as talent shows are considered high on misery points, but Molly does everything she can to stop her from performing without explaining why. Eventually, Molly tells Libby the truth, but she decides to go on anyway by turning her singing act into a spoken verse poetry act. It ends up working, much to Scratch's disappointment. Molly agrees to be more honest with Libby, except when it comes to Scratch.
9	9	"Scratch the Surface"	Johnny Castuciano	Sammie Crowley	Steve Hirt	November 20, 2021	110	0.33
9	9	"Friend-Off"	Sam King	Paul Chang	Kat Ruzics	November 20, 2021	110	0.33
Molly is saddened by the fact that she cannot tell Libby about her adventures with Scratch. He tells her that as more people know about him, he becomes less scary and could even lose his job. She decides to create an alter ego named Millie so that she can tell Libby anything. Libby sees through the disguise, becomes suspicious of Molly's actions, and chases her through Brighton. When Libby finally confronts her, she believes that Molly no longer wants to be friends with her. Scratch finally allows Molly to tell Libby the truth, and she is able to see him for the first time, only to faint. Libby is shocked to learn of Scratch's existence and immediately dislikes him due to his personality (and vice versa). However, Molly believes they can be friends and arranges a scavenger hunt to get the two to work together. Over time, Scratch and Libby turn the whole thing into a competition to see who Molly's real best friend is. Molly gets into trouble when she falls into a compost machine, and Scratch and Libby put aside their differences to save her. Ultimately, the two realize they have a lot in common and mock some of Molly's habits, much to her annoyance.
10	10	"Festival of Lights"	Johnny Castuciano	Peri Segel	Steve Hirt	November 27, 2021	111	0.37
10	10	"Saving Christmas"	Stephen Heneveld	Peter Limm	Megan Fisher	November 27, 2021	111	0.37
The McGees and Scratch spend time with the Stein-Torres family on the last day of Hanukkah. A power outage occurs all throughout Brighton, but Ms. Stein-Torres has a backup generator, causing everyone to stay in her store for the time being. The McGees and Scratch take part in various Jewish traditions such as a game of dreidel, miracle boxes, storytelling, and (in Scratch's case) eating greasy foods. The generator, expected to last only one hour, ends up lasting eight hours. Thankfully, the power comes back on and Molly tells Libby that she had a wonderful time spending Hanukkah with her. During the Snowflake Celebration, all the Christmas lights in town suddenly burn out, causing celebrations to be cancelled. Molly and even Andrea ask Mr. Davenport to help by contributing more decorations, but he greedily turns them down. Scratch and the McGees try to pull a Christmas Carol event on him, but he sees through it. With Molly's spirits dashed, Scratch makes a solo effort, and Mr. Davenport discovers that Andrea is sad as well because she wanted to be the Snow Queen for the celebration. With his change of heart, Mr. Davenport, Scratch, and the McGees repair the town decorations just in time for Christmas.
11	11	"Ice Princess"	Stephen Heneveld	Peter Limm	Waymond Singleton	February 12, 2022	112	0.24
11	11	"Ready, Set, Snow!"	Johnny Castuciano	Sammie Crowley	Fadia Alhallak	February 12, 2022	112	0.24
Everyone panics as a major snow storm is about to hit Brighton. Scratch reveals that it is caused by the spirit of a failed ice skater named Sonia Davis (a parody of real life Olympic figure skater and movie star Sonja Henie). The McGees visit her as she tries to perfect her routine and, in the process, learn that she needs a partner. Pete is revealed to be a former ice skater himself and becomes Sonia's partner, but she threatens to freeze Brighton forever if their routine fails. The two of them perform flawlessly, but fail at their very last move. Instead of being angry, Sonia realizes that she had a lot of fun and gives up on winning, finally able to pass on. Brighton gets a snow day, and Molly calls Libby to ask her and Scratch to play in the snow. Instead, they want to try hygge and keep warm. Angry, Molly tries to get Geoff, Sharon, Pete and Grandma Nin to go out with her, but they all end up joining Scratch and Libby. Darryl, who was outside, finds it unbearable and also joins the hygge. In a deranged state, Molly heads outside to enjoy the snow by herself. Despite being miserable and cold, she refuses to stop playing. Scratch finally convinces her to join the hygge, only for everyone to become too warm and head outside after all, to Molly's frustration.
12	12	"Game Night"	Sam King	Peter Limm	Alayna Cabral	February 19, 2022 (Note: This episode was originally set to air on November 6, 2021, but was moved at the request of the crew for continuity reasons. Regardless, it was released early on Disney+ Hotstar in Indonesia, Malaysia, and Thailand on January 28, 2022 in the place of episode 7.)	107	0.31
12	12	"The Don't-Gooder"	Stephen Heneveld & Sam King	Cynthia Furey	Kat Ruzics	February 19, 2022	107	0.31
To get out of cleaning the downstairs bathroom, Scratch exploits the McGees' weakness for a board game titled Mega City, a game that Sharon is apparently lousy at and thus refuses to play. Scratch cheats and wins, forcing the McGees to clean the bathroom instead of him, but Sharon finally decides to confront him with a winner-take-all situation. It turns out that Sharon is actually a former Mega City champion (she lost to her family on purpose to spare their feelings) and completely annihilates Scratch with little effort. Scared of her ego, Pete takes the game and buries it and Scratch ends up cleaning the downstairs bathroom. Molly becomes infuriated by the attention Andrea has been receiving for doing charity work, despite her not actually doing much in comparison to Molly. She attempts to outdo her by selling nougat bars, but Andrea outsells her. With Scratch's help, they discover that Andrea bought all the bars herself and Molly decides to recruit Darryl to help expose her at a school event. She regrets this after realizing that Andrea was seeking the approval of her disinterested parents, and manages to cover for her when she gets exposed. Back at home, Molly embraces her parents while Scratch eats all of Andrea's nougat bars.
13	13	"Innocent Until Proven Ghostly"	Sam King	Paul Chang	June VanOtterdyk	February 26, 2022	113	0.24
13	13	"Twin Trouble"	Sam King	Cynthia Furey	Alayna Cabral	February 26, 2022	113	0.24
Pete's anniversary cake, which he baked himself, is eaten. The family blames Scratch, so Molly holds a trial. Sharon, Darryl, and even Pete are all questioned, but they all have alibis. They discover ectoplasm under the plate, further convincing them that Scratch is the culprit, but he still claims innocence. When Molly realizes that carob is one of the ingredients, she reveals to her family that Scratch has a severe carob allergy, proving his innocence. The McGees apologize for doubting him and the cake is revealed to have been eaten by Geoff, who thought it was for him. Pete dreads the arrival of his older twin siblings Billy and Jilly, who unintentionally torment him. His sadness results in the arrival of Sobgoblins, whom Scratch is afraid of as they feed off of depression. Molly tries to fight them off, but she too succumbs to them as does a powerless Sharon. However, upon seeing Darryl beginning to emulate the twins by picking on Molly, Pete finally chastises his siblings, who solemnly admit that they think of him as a success compared to them. The Sobgoblins are about to drain them, but the McGees all forgive and forget and hug to finally defeat them.
14	14	"Goat Your Own Way"	Stephen Heneveld	Cynthia Furey	Megan Fisher	March 5, 2022	114	0.25
14	14	"A Very Hungry Ghost"	Johnny Castuciano	Peri Segel	Fadia Alhallak	March 5, 2022	114	0.25
Molly is tasked with training a goat named Totes for the county fair. However, she is unable to comply with the strict regimen and tries the "Molly Method", which only results in Totes getting fat. Meanwhile, Scratch uses the proper training technique on Pete so that he can get Scratch his own personal fried food platter. The final day comes and Totes ends up eating Scratch's hard-earned platter, resulting in the McGees and Totes being banned from the fair. Realizing that she should have just listened to her mother and follow the proper procedures, Molly has Totes trim the Brighton City Park, where he ends up losing weight. Grandma Nin visits to help Molly and Darryl celebrate Sart Duan Sib while Pete and Sharon go camping. The special day is meant to be a feast for ghosts, exciting Scratch, but he must invite other guests. He intends to only bring Geoff, but after being told by Scratch to "not tell nobody" (a double negative), Geoff ends up inviting even more ghosts. Soon, the Ghost Council arrives as well, forcing Molly to pretend that she is under servitude to Scratch. Thankfully, the Council leaves satisfied after having a nice meal. Scratch fails to get any food, but Nin offers to order him a pizza.
15	15	"Scare Tactics"	Sam King	Sammie Crowley	Alayna Cabral	March 12, 2022	115	0.21
15	15	"The Bad Boy Bobby Daniels"	Stephen Heneveld	Paul Chang	Waymond Singleton	March 12, 2022	115	0.21
Scratch and Geoff attend a yearly scaring seminar, but play hooky during the class. Meanwhile, Molly is left home alone until she learns that Darryl's pet tarantula Heidi Hairylegs is loose. Despite her best efforts, she is unable to capture her. Scratch has to perform a scare tactic to the Chairman or risk getting sent to the Flow of Failed Phantoms. Geoff saves him by claiming that he invented a new tactic and peeking in on Molly, they see her horribly frightened and think Scratch was responsible. After he returns from the seminar, Molly reveals that they cannot enter the house because Heidi had babies. Patty reveals that her long lost love Bobby Daniels mysteriously abandoned her when she was younger and Molly and Scratch decide to look for him. They find him at a library where he has become very homely. Despite his failure to return to his bad-boy self, Molly reunites him with Patty. When she reminds him why he left, Bobby claims that she sent him a letter. Suddenly, a masked rider kidnaps him and Molly, Scratch and Patty give chase and learn that Linda, Patty's best friend, split them because she did not want to lose her. With everything resolved, Patty and Bobby resume their relationship.
16	16	"Citizen McGee"	Johnny Castuciano	Peter Limm	Steve Hirt	June 11, 2022	116	0.19
16	16	"The Internship"	Stephen Heneveld	Cynthia Furey	Megan Fisher	June 11, 2022	116	0.19
Molly volunteers for the "Mayor for a Day" position, but Mayor Brunson gives her the job permanently as he finds it stressful. Molly sets up a syrup-powered slide as part of "enhappifying" the town, but this attracts horseflies that swarm the citizens. Molly and Scratch find Brunson who does not want to return, but his new lease on life is not all that much better. Molly calls upon the ghosts of the previous mayors who convince Brunson to take his job back, and he saves the town. While Molly is sad she was not a good mayor, Brunson tells her that she will make a good mayor one day through time and experience. Molly is assigned to be an intern to Weird Larry at his cluttered pawn shop, which she believes is "where dreams go to die". She tries to get out of it, but when that fails, she tries to make the store cleaner and more efficient, but this saddens Larry who had it organized his way. She finally learns the error of her ways when Larry shows off a mechanical dragon made from discarded junk. Meanwhile, Scratch hires an intern named Reggie, but mistreats him. When Reggie tells the Council that he actually learned positive things from Scratch, he is promoted to be his boss instead, much to Scratch's chagrin.
17	17	"The Lucky Penny"	Sam King	Paul Chang	June VanOtterdyk	June 18, 2022	117	0.18
17	17	"Lock, Stock, and Peril"	Johnny Castuciano	Sammie Crowley	Fadia Alhallak	June 18, 2022	117	0.18
Libby is concerned with Friday the 13th as her bad luck tends to increase during that time. Molly offers to give her good luck to Libby for the day and Scratch enchants a penny with Molly's good luck and gives it to Libby. Libby experiences a good day, while Molly begins to suffer. However, they accidentally drop the penny into Andrea's purse, resulting in her getting too lucky and unknowingly absorbing everyone's luck and creating nearby disasters. Libby is forced to counteract it and successfully gets the penny back. She decides to give the good luck back to Molly as she finds it too stressful for her. The McGees are trying to fix a broken fuse after Scratch knocked out the power while using the bathroom. Molly accidentally locks the door to the basement, trapping Sharon, Pete and Darryl in there. While they panic and cause internal conflict, Molly and Scratch go to get help from Weird Larry, only to get distracted by various things and miss him several times throughout the day. Molly is finally forced to overcome her absent-mindedness and has Scratch possess Weird Larry so that they can drive back to the house and get him to finally unlock the basement door. Molly apologizes for getting distracted.
18	18	"Out of House and Home"	Sam King	Cynthia Furey	Alayna Cabral	June 25, 2022	118	0.17
18	18	"Home is Where the Haunt Is"	Stephen Heneveld	Paul Chang	Waymond Singleton	June 25, 2022	118	0.17
While trying to clean the gutters, Pete falls off the roof and ends up in the hospital. The McGees find themselves with an exorbitant bill, requiring Molly, Darryl, and Sharon to find quick ways to make money while a very compliant Scratch performs all the house duties and cares for Pete. As usual, things do not go so smoothly for the McGees as their family dynamic changes. Luckily, they manage to get all the money and send it to the hospital, only for realtor Candace Green to inform them that they did not pay their mortgage, forcing the McGees to move out and leaving Scratch all alone. The McGees are forced to live in their van in the woods. Molly continues to go to school, but tells Libby that everything is fine, though she can clearly see through her lies. Meanwhile, Scratch tries to scare away any potential buyers, until Candace gets the attention of a creepy expectant couple who take a liking to Scratch. Scratch begs Candace to not sell the house, and although she cannot stop the sale, she allows the McGees one final goodbye to the house. Fortunately, Andrea, who saw the McGees' living conditions, convinced Brighton to help them buy their house back. The McGees happily reunite with Scratch and their house.
19	19	"Scaring is Caring"	Johnny Castuciano	Peri Segel	Steve Hirt	July 2, 2022	119	0.20
19	19	"All Night Plight"	Sam King	Sammie Crowley & Cynthia Furey	June VanOtterdyk	July 2, 2022	119	0.20
Scratch puts off his scare report until the last minute and to make matters worse, he is now filled with "joy", gradually making him smaller, cuter, and unable to perform his tasks efficiently. Molly decides to fill in for him and is further motivated when Scratch laughs at her notion. At the ghost doctor, Scratch is told that he needs to find his fear while Molly tries and fails miserably to scare people around Brighton. In the end, Scratch gets scared when he sees Molly in danger and he reverts to his usual self while rescuing her, ironically meaning that she technically scared him successfully. Molly wants to hold a gathering for herself, Libby, and Scratch to watch a rare comet fly over Brighton. Molly has her mother drive out to the country due to the city's light pollution and things get even more complicated as a drowsy Libby behaves like a fantasy hero and Scratch desperately tries to order something to eat as the snacks were accidentally left at home. After Libby scares a herd of buffalo towards them, Molly admits to a frustrated Scratch that she wanted one perfect memory for all of them to remember. Scratch becomes a hot air balloon and flies Molly and Libby above the overcast sky so that they can finally see the comet.
20	20	"The Jig is Up"	Stephen Heneveld	Madison Bateman	Megan Fisher	July 9, 2022	120	0.15
20	20	"Molly vs. the Ghost World"	Johnny Castuciano	Madison Bateman	Fadia Alhallak	July 9, 2022	120	0.15
The Ghost Council discovers that joy has increased in Brighton and sends Jinx, a joy hunter, to watch over Scratch. He continuously attempts to dissuade her but is later horrified to learn that ghosts spread misery because the Chairman feeds off of it. He finally manages to get rid of her and get back with Molly, but Jinx returns and discovers Molly as the source of Brighton's joy. She attempts to kill her, but Scratch stands between them. Realizing that Scratch has befriended a human this entire time, Jinx takes him away to be punished, leaving Molly distraught. The McGees and Libby are all concerned for Scratch's well-being. Molly calls upon Geoff to aid them. Thanks to Geoff's portal, Molly becomes a wraith, someone who is not dead, but still a ghost. Her mere existence in the Ghost Realm causes joy to be spread whenever she touches anything. She manages to reach Scratch at his trial, but the Council decides to send Molly, Scratch, and Geoff to the flow of failed phantoms. However, Molly's joy overpowers the flow and frees every single ghost that was sent there while she disintegrates the Chairman with a single touch. Everyone returns home back in the human world.

=== Season 2 (2023–24) ===
No. overall	No. in season	Title	Directed by	Written by	Storyboarded by	Original release date	Prod. code	U.S. viewers (millions)
21	1	"The New (Para)Normal"	Sam King & Stephen Heneveld	Madison Bateman	Alayna Cabral & Waymond Singleton	April 1, 2023	201	0.15
A new family, the Chens, moves to Brighton and the McGees greet them with a warm welcome. Meanwhile, Scratch unwillingly becomes the new Chairman of the Ghost World (after the original one's demise in the Season 1 finale) and teaches the Barrister ghosts to have fun. The McGees want to be friends with the Chens and find that the people in their family have common interests as them. However, after Ollie, the son of the Chen family, reveals that he and his family are ghost hunters, Molly tries to hide the Barrister ghosts from them, during which scary creatures called "Frightmares" appear in the house, forcing Scratch to don the Chairman's outfit and send them away. In order to avoid suspicion from the Chens, the McGees decide to stay friends with the family, while promising to protect Scratch. Meanwhile, the Chens discover that there are ghosts in Brighton and set out to hunt them.
22	2	"Book Marks the Sprite"	Johnny Castuciano	Paul Chang	Steve Hirt	April 8, 2023 (Note: This episode was first released on Disney+ on April 2, 2023.)	202	0.11
22	2	"Double, Double, Darryl & Trouble"	Sam King	Sammie Crowley	June VanOtterdyk	April 8, 2023	202	0.11
Libby's mother asks her to watch the book store while she is out, which becomes a problem when a story sprite, a tiny creature who has the ability to consume words in stories and become the characters in them, appears. As if that wasn't bad enough, Ollie enters the book store, looking for ghosts. Molly takes him outside as Scratch and Libby try to defeat the Sprite. Eventually, Libby uses her diary to turn the Sprite into a clone of herself, who puts all the words back in the books and cleans up the store. Meanwhile, Molly is unable to convince Ollie that ghosts aren't as bad as they seem, due to his father having once been terrorized by one in his childhood. However, Libby reassures her that there's still a chance for him to change his mind. After getting in trouble at school once again, Darryl becomes a wraith so he can have fun while his soulless husk does all his work. After seeing everyone commend Darryl's husk on his good behaviour, he thinks that they prefer it to the real him and he prepares to run away. However, after overhearing Pete and Sharon lament over how Darryl has lost his spark, Darryl chases his body as it hops onto the back of a garbage truck on the way to the junkyard (as he previously called his husk a "piece of garbage"). After he rescues his body right before it can be burned in the incinerator, Darryl re-enters his body and returns home. The family becomes glad that Darryl is his own self again.
23	3	"Faint of Art"	Stephen Heneveld	Mia Resella	Megan Fisher	April 15, 2023	203	0.16
23	3	"A Soda to Remember"	Johnny Castuciano	Brandon Hoang	James Suhr	April 15, 2023	203	0.16
Sharon goes down into the basement to fulfill her passion for painting, but is intimidated by the blank canvas and cannot come up with anything. She continually tries to get away from painting, but her family keeps stopping her. Eventually, Sharon confesses that, with so many things that paused her passion in life, she is afraid to follow her dreams, but Molly tells her that it is okay to feel that way. After Scratch accidentally sits in Sharon's paint and rubs his posterior onto the canvas, Sharon is finally inspired to paint, and Scratch and Molly leave her to paint in peace. As Molly and Libby reminisce on past memories, Scratch reveals that he doesn't remember anything from his life before he became a ghost, except for a brand of strawberry soda that was discontinued years ago. Fortunately, Darryl is able to obtain a bottle online, but when he shows it to the others at school, Principal O'Conner confiscates it. The four plan out a heist to steal the soda back, but Scratch attempts to sabotage the mission, afraid of remembering something bad. Molly reassures Scratch and they succeed in stealing the soda, though Molly and Darryl then get in trouble when Sharon finds out what they have been up to. When Scratch drinks the soda, he remembers a time as a child when a friend of his moved away, and looks off into the distance trying to remember who she is.
24	4	"A Period Piece"	Sam King	Peri Segel	Alayna Cabral	April 22, 2023	204	0.12
24	4	"It's Always Sunny in Sunnyland"	Stephen Heneveld	Paul Chang	Waymond Singleton	April 22, 2023	204	0.12
When Molly invites Libby and Andrea to a sleepover, Libby ends up getting her first period. Having already experienced this event, Andrea helps Libby out and they become closer to each other (even forming a "period pact"). While Pete and Scratch are out buying period products, Molly becomes threatened by Libby and Andrea's new bond and tries to act more mature to join in, but eventually breaks down. Libby and Andrea assure Molly that everyone grows up at their own pace and that they will still be friends with her, making Molly happy. When bad weather cancels the McGees' plans for a week's vacation in Sunnyland, Molly decides to bring the vacation to them by creating a makeshift Sunnyland park in their home. She hires Scratch to help out and the family have the time of their lives. However, the family expects the fun to last the whole week, and Molly starts getting tired planning things out. She tries to hire Libby to help, but Libby is more interested in the rides. After an exhausted and frustrated Molly accidentally floods the house, everyone apologizes to her for not being considerate of her feelings and they let her join in the fun.
25	5	"I Wanna Dance with Some-Ollie"	Stephen Heneveld	Brandon Hoang	Megan Fisher	April 29, 2023	206	0.25
25	5	"Davenport's on Demand"	Johnny Castuciano	Paul Chang	James Suhr	April 29, 2023	206	0.25
Molly is going with Ollie to an upcoming school dance, much to the chagrin of Scratch, due to the fact that Ollie is a ghost hunter. At the dance, everyone deems Molly and Ollie a couple, while Scratch tries to sabotage the dance. Molly tells Scratch that she indeed has a crush on Ollie, and an upset Scratch leaves and gets caught in a ghost trap that the Chens set up. Upon finding out Scratch was trapped, Molly frees him, and they apologize to each other, with the former declaring that she and Ollie are through. Unbeknownst to them, Ollie found out about Scratch and overheard what Molly said, leaving him heartbroken. After the dance, Esther asks Ollie if something is wrong, but he lies and decides to keep Molly's secret from his family. Andrea takes an interest in coding and creates an app that allows people to order anything. The app proves to be extremely popular, especially with the McGee family, until Molly finds that small businesses are being closed due to the app's success. After failing to compete, by starting a delivery service with the other business owners, Molly leads a protest against the Davenports to shut down the app. While Mr. and Mrs. Davenport do not care, Andrea feels bad and shuts down the app while Molly distracts Andrea's father. Andrea then promises to use her coding for good from now on. Meanwhile, the CEO of a company called Bizmart decides to expand his business into Brighton.
26	6	"A Doll to Die For"	Johnny Castuciano & Steve Hirt	Mia Resella	Steve Hirt	May 6, 2023	205	0.13
26	6	"The (After)life of the Party"	Sam King	Sammie Crowley	June VanOtterdyk	May 6, 2023	205	0.13
Scratch curses a scary, trouble-making ghost named "Lord Doom" to possess the next object he sees, which turns out to be a baby doll in the human realm. Despite coming to the McGees' house to attack Scratch, Molly decides to train Lord Doom to be nice. As time passes, Molly becomes concerned that Lord Doom is trying to kill her, but he reveals that he was only trying to make her a collage. He becomes saddened by how Molly doesn't trust him, but he also realizes that he doesn't belong with the McGees due to his intense personality. He eventually becomes the plaything of Gertrude and Hidalgo's son, Octavious. Scratch is invited to Geoff's party, but thinking it might be dull, he decides to instead go to a (supposedly) more impressive party, being held by another ghost named Jeff (spelled differently). Molly becomes exasperated, and feels that Scratch should go with whomever invited him first (which was Geoff). At Jeff's party, Scratch sees Geoff there and tries to hide from him. Jinx, who is also at the party, exposes Scratch to Geoff as revenge for Scratch defeating the Chairman. It turns out that Geoff and Jeff are afterlife partners and had set up the party together (which Jinx knew all along), and Scratch joins in the fun, though Jeff warns him not to trifle with Geoff's feelings again.
27	7	"Frightmares on Main Street"	Johnny Castuciano, Steve Hirt & Sam King	Paul Chang	Steve Hirt & June VanOtterdyk	May 13, 2023	208	0.16
In a Halloween episode that acts as a continuation of "I Wanna Dance with Some-Ollie", Molly sets up a "haunted house" near the school to raise money to help a young boy buy a cow. To help out, Scratch invites all the ghosts to make the haunted house more realistic. Meanwhile, Ollie, now fully aware of Scratch's existence, thinks that Scratch has corrupted Molly and tries to "save" her by getting rid of Scratch. The rest of the Chens are then alerted to the presence of the ghosts and arrive at the school to look for them. Molly tries to distract the Chens, while Scratch tries to get the rest of the ghosts to leave, though Ollie ends up catching Scratch. Molly confronts Ollie about his prejudiced views of ghosts, telling him that some can be good. However, the Frightmares suddenly show up to wreak havoc, having been drawn by the chaos of the ghosts fleeing from the Chens. Scratch dons his Chairman outfit and curses the Frightmares to get trapped in a canister that June had been making to trap ghosts, leaving the latter suspicious. The Chens (except for Ollie, who finally trusts the ghosts) vow to keep hunting for ghosts in order to prove their existence to everyone, which concerns Molly and Scratch.
28	8	"The Unhaunting of Brighton Video"	Sam King	Mia Resella	Alayna Cabral	May 20, 2023	213	0.16
28	8	"100% Molly McGee"	Johnny Castuciano	Peri Siegel and Mia Resella	James Suhr	May 20, 2023	213	0.16
A ghost named Blair is haunting the former store, "Brighton Video", which is due to be converted into a community center, and Molly enlists the help of the Ghost Friends (including Scratch, Libby and ex-ghost hunter Ollie) to deal with her. After the group's failed attempts to get Blair to leave, Ollie shockingly takes her side, and the rest of the group gets kicked out of the store. Eventually, Ollie confesses that he has had trouble getting over his past life of hunting ghosts, which prompts Blair to admit that, when she was still alive, she failed to return the horror movie "Blood Mansion", and died before she could. In order to solve the problem, the group pretends to be employees at the store so Blair can return the overdue movie. She then happily leaves the store, her unfinished business taken care of. Molly's Thai cousin, Emmie Suksai, comes to visit, along with her Uncle David and Grandma Nin. While excited at first, Molly soon comes to realize that her mother's side of the family is steeped in Thai culture much more than she herself is and feels inadequate. She decides to undergo a cram session to learn more about the Thai language and culture. While she succeeds to an extent, she is still unable to keep up with her family rapidly speaking Thai during a meal and breaks down, deciding that she's not "Thai enough". However, her family empathizes, admitting times when they also didn't feel Thai enough. Emmie says they love Molly the way she is, which makes her happy, and declares that she is "100% Molly McGee".
29	9	"All Shark No Bite"	Stephen Heneveld	Sammie Crowley	Waymond Singleton	July 8, 2023 (Note: This episode was first released on Disney+ on June 28, 2023.)	211	0.07
29	9	"Nin-dependence"	Sam King	Paul Chang and Peri Segel	June VanOtterdyk	July 8, 2023	211	0.07
Pete and Sharon go out for a date night, leaving Molly, Darryl and Scratch by themselves. They watch a horror movie, "Fins of Fear", which is about a ghost shark. While Molly and Darryl are terrified, Scratch reassures them that the ghost shark is not real and, donning his Chairman outfit, "summons" one to prove it. However, the trio are horrified when they discover that the summoning worked, and spend the night fleeing the ghost shark in terror, all the way up to Molly's bedroom. They eventually realize that Scratch didn't summon the ghost shark; he created it and has the power to decide what the ghost shark is. He decides to change it into a cuter, docile version of itself. Pete and Sharon return home to find them all relaxing on the couch and, though confused about the ghost shark's presence, they decide not to ask. After Grandma Nin injures herself, the McGees take her in, but prove to be overprotective of her. She sends them out on various errands so that she can sneak out on her own, and when they return and discover that she's not there, they all get worried and search the town for her. Meanwhile, she is found by the other senior citizens of Brighton after suffering a dizzy spell and collapsing, and enjoys their company more. When the McGee family catch up to her at the senior home, she tells them that she wants to stay there, where she'll receive better care (while still maintaining a measure of independence), and they apologize for the way they treated her.
30	10	"Like Father Like Libby"	Sam King	Sammie Crowley and Peri Segel	Alayna Cabral	July 15, 2023	207	0.08
30	10	"Dance Dad Revolution"	Stephen Heneveld	Mia Resella	Waymond Singleton	July 15, 2023	207	0.08
Libby gets a present from her father in the mail, along with a letter asking for her to visit. Libby is excited to meet him, as she hadn't seen him in years due to his travels around the world for his career as a novelist. Her mother agrees to take her on a road trip to see him, though she is apparently reluctant. Along the way, Libby fantasizes about all the fun things she anticipates doing with him to make up for lost time. However, when she finally meets him again, he tells her that he'll be spending his time expanding his newly finished story into a trilogy instead of with her, showing he cares more about his career than her. A heartbroken Libby returns to her mother, who cheers her up and hugs her. Meanwhile, Molly volunteers to babysit Libby's pet turtles while she's away. She quickly loses track of them, but manages to gather them all up just as Libby returns home. Pete's campaign for a plastic bag ban gets ignored by the mayor, who is too engrossed in watching Internet videos. Molly helps him out by creating a social media profile and encouraging him to dance while delivering his message, and his videos become extremely popular and successful. However, he eventually gets caught up in his Internet fame and forgets his original intentions, which concerns Molly. She and the rest of the family hold an intervention, with help from the rest of the people of Brighton, and he sees the error of his ways. Meanwhile, Scratch, inspired by Pete's method of influencing through dance, uses it to get other ghosts to do his Chairman duties for him, particularly cleaning up a dance hall that was ruined by the Frightmares. This works until the ghosts crave other styles of dance and end up ruining the dance hall again.
31	11	"Jinx!"	Sam King	Paul Chang	Alayna Cabral	July 22, 2023	210	0.18
31	11	"Let's Play Turnipball!"	Waymond Singleton	Brandon Hoang	Waymond Singleton	July 22, 2023	210	0.18
Still upset with Scratch because of the Chairman's demise, Jinx curses Scratch with bad luck and tells him that, if she says his name three times, the curse will be undone. Scratch, with the help of Molly, manages to get Jinx to say his name the first two times, but she ultimately finds out about the ruse before saying it a third time. However, Scratch manages to curse Jinx back and they later un-curse each other, though Jinx still holds a grudge against Scratch. Brighton gets ready to face Perfektborg in a game of Turnipball, with Ollie as their new team member. Ollie, despite not knowing how to play the game, keeps making good plays with pure luck. When he suddenly gets a timeout after misinterpreting one of the rules, Brighton begins to fall behind, and the team begins to suspect that the Perfektborgians are cheating. While snooping around in their locker room to investigate, Molly realizes that the Perfektborg team members are actually very nice and they agree to purposely let the Brightonians win out of pity. Meanwhile, Scratch attempts to outdo the Perfektborg team's mascot (a meatball) by acting as the Brighton team's mascot (dressed as a turnip), but realizes how friendly the meatball mascot is. Unfortunately, Ollie inadvertently causes the team to lose by scoring the automatic loss, but Brighton is just glad that their team actually scored some points and they are determined to win next time.
32	12	"The Ghost IS Molly McGee"	Johnny Castuciano	Brandon Hoang	Steve Hirt	July 29, 2023	212	0.14
32	12	"All in the Mind"	Stephen Heneveld	Story by : Mia Resella and Sammie Crowley; Written by : Sammie Crowley	Megan Fisher	July 29, 2023	212	0.14
Molly becomes the stage director of Libby's school play, but the children refuse to actually work on it. Meanwhile, the Ghost Council goes on strike because Scratch does not show appreciation for their work. Molly and Scratch decide to swap bodies and fix each other's problems. This works out well for the most part, but a girl named Georgie stubbornly refuses to listen to Scratch, while Bartholomew refuses all the gifts that Molly gives him. To resolve both conflicts, Scratch and Molly calmly talk with Georgie and Bartholomew respectively and listen to what they have to say. Afterwards, Scratch resolves to let Georgie, who never got a casting role in a play, star in it, while Molly promises Bartholomew that Scratch will no longer eat at the Ghost Council's table. Taking place after the events of "A Soda to Remember", Scratch develops bubbles on his body and his doctor tells him that the problem is in his mind. To allow them to enter Scratch's mind and solve the problem, Scratch reluctantly opens a portal into it. Scratch's mind is revealed to be just a colorless version of the McGees' house, with a monkey wearing a suit appearing frequently. After a long search, Scratch and Molly get sucked inside Scratch's dollhouse, which leads them to a cardboard boat in a strawberry soda bottle. Scratch is eventually forced to tell Molly the truth about the memory he had about his old friend (who was named Adia), and Molly reassures Scratch that she will always be there for him.
33	13	"Carbon Zero Heroes"	Johnny Castuciano	Paul Chang	Steve Hirt	August 5, 2023	214	0.09
33	13	"Davenport's in Demise"	Sam King	Sammie Crowley	June VanOtterdyk	August 5, 2023	214	0.09
After hearing a class presentation on climate change, Molly and Ollie dedicate themselves to a carbon-neutral lifestyle. Meanwhile, Libby resigns herself to preparing for a climate apocalypse, inviting Scratch into a bunker underneath her bookstore. Molly and Ollie make several sacrifices for their cause, including riding bicycles to Andrea's birthday party (only to arrive late), and refusing to watch movies, eat meat or dairy, or use kitchen appliances. When Darryl calculates that the results of their efforts were negligible, they are devastated. They rendezvous in Libby's bunker, where Scratch is despairing over the lack of ice cream in an apocalypse scenario. However, his ranting leads Molly to realize the true solution to climate change: mobilizing everyone to work together to stop it. They present their case to the rest of the town, and it succeeds. Taking place after the events of "Davenport's on Demand", Mayor Brunson bans shopping giant Bizmart from building a mega-store inside Brighton, only for Bizmart to build one just outside Brighton instead. The Davenports face having their store go out of business and hold a liquidation sale. Andrea experiences an identity crisis, as her online identity was primarily supported by the Davenport's business. With Molly's assistance, she makes several attempts to rebrand herself, but nothing works, and she loses followers. Eventually, Andrea breaks down with Molly, accidentally streaming it live, which earns multiple supportive comments. They realize that Andrea's online identity should be her true self, and Andrea decides to take a break from social media to find herself.
34	14	"Web of Lies"	Stephen Heneveld	Story by : Madison Bateman; Written by : Sam Cherington	Megan Fisher	August 12, 2023	215	0.19
34	14	"Kenny's Falling Star"	Johnny Castuciano	Brandon Hoang	James Suhr	August 12, 2023	215	0.19
After Darryl warns Molly and Scratch not to enter the basement, they give in to temptation and do so anyway. Molly ends up stepping on (what looks like) Heidi Hairylegs, Darryl's pet tarantula, apparently killing her. She and Scratch bury her in the backyard and agree to never tell Darryl what happened. However, they are both wracked with guilt and have several spidery hallucinations. They dig up her grave, but then Darryl walks in on them to ask what they're up to and if they've seen Heidi, who has gone missing. She then appears on Darryl's shoulder, and Molly and Scratch, believing her to be a ghost, confess. Darryl then reveals that Heidi had been in the basement because she was molting; what Molly had stepped on wasn't actually her, but her discarded skin. Molly and Scratch are relieved. Molly runs into Kenny Star, who is hiding out in Brighton after being exposed as a sellout. She lets him stay at her house and helps him reconnect to his country roots. Meanwhile, Scratch and Darryl auction off several items that Kenny had touched on the Internet. This allows the press to learn Kenny's location, causing him to panic. Molly stages a concert for him at the bandshell, and he sings a genuine country song for the press, moving them and reconciling his reputation.
35	15	"Welcome to NecroComic-Con"	Sam King	Paul Chang	Alayna Cabral	October 28, 2023	216	0.19
35	15	"Fit to Print"	Stephen Heneveld	Gloria Shen	Waymond Singleton	October 28, 2023	216	0.19
Molly, Ollie and Scratch are attending NecroComic-Con, a ghost hunter convention, in Brighton. At the Chen family's booth, they reveal that they plan to showcase the Phantom Canister, which still contains the Frightmares that Scratch had sealed into it. Molly and Ollie realize that this would result in an all-out war between humans and ghosts. After several failed attempts to steal the canister, Molly convinces Ollie to try to convince his parents that ghosts aren't bad, but this also fails. However, after hearing his explanation that a ghost (Scratch) had stopped the Frightmares, June realizes that this is why the canister is working and containing the Frightmares, after it had failed previously. She swaps the canister out for a doll, and, when Ruben and Esther present it, they are met with mocking laughter. Afterwards, June meets Scratch, takes a liking to him and states her desire to "experiment" on him. Molly becomes editor-in-chief of the Brighton Middle School Bugle, the school newspaper, which has lost funding. She seeks out advertisements and procures a sponsorship from Flavor Burger, a burger joint trying to market its new burger made from Brighton turnips. Molly also enlists Libby and Scratch to find a good story for the front page, but when they hear that the burgers taste good, they become suspicious because Brighton's turnips are notorious for tasting bad. They stake out Flavor Burger and discover that the burgers are not made from Brighton turnips, but from parsnips imported from Perfektborg. Knowing that this will result in Flavor Burger pulling their sponsorship, Molly publishes the story anyway, choosing integrity over longevity. The citizens of Brighton are outraged, and picket Flavor Burger. Molly is sad that the newspaper will apparently be shut down due to lack of funding, until several other local business owners offer to advertise themselves in the newspaper, saving it.
36	16	"Smile Valley Farm"	Johnny Castuciano	Sammie Crowley	Steve Hirt	November 4, 2023	217	0.18
36	16	"The Grand Gesture"	Sam King	Jenava Mie	June VanOtterdyk	November 4, 2023	217	0.18
The McGees are all enjoying a new farming simulation video game called Smile Valley Farm. Scratch is openly disdainful at first, but eventually gets hooked as well when he plays it in private. He resolves to keep his playing a secret from the family, which gets increasingly difficult as Molly keeps making him do things with her in the real world. When he admits to her that he's been playing it all along, Molly reveals that she'd already figured it out from a request he'd sent her in the game. Meanwhile, Darryl talks Sharon into helping him flip merchandise for profit. He eventually cashes out, but Sharon keeps buying more merchandise until the craze for the game wears off and she is unable to resell it. Molly is readying herself to ask Ollie to be her boyfriend. Libby and Scratch resolve to help Molly make the moment into a "grand gesture", but their attempts repeatedly go wrong. Meanwhile, Darryl and June accidentally bring to life a sample of ectoplasm borrowed from Scratch. It escapes the house and eats electricity from various sources, eventually causing a power outage and growing to gargantuan size as it eats. After it has eaten enough, it reverts to its original size and gains intelligence, telling everyone to simply declare their love for each other and that the expression does not have to be a grand one. Taking the advice, Molly finally asks Ollie to be her boyfriend. Ollie accepts, and the power returns to Brighton as they hold hands.
37	17	"The Many Lives of Scratch"	Stephen Heneveld	Madison Bateman, Paul Chang, Sammie Crowley, Brandon Hoang and Peri Segel	Megan Fisher	November 11, 2023	218	0.12
37	17	"Alaka-Sham!"	Johnny Castuciano	Brandon Hoang	James Suhr	November 11, 2023	218	0.12
Upon learning that Scratch has never had an official "death day party," Molly, along with Geoff, Libby and the rest of the McGees, throw one for him as a surprise. However, Scratch cannot tell the story of how he died as per tradition, as he doesn't remember his life or his death. They all improvise different, far-fetched stories, and, though Scratch dismisses all of them as being too unbelievable, he is moved by the gesture as a whole. He suggests doing another party next year, but with better stories. Darryl's latest money-making scheme is performing close-up magic with Scratch's assistance, much to Molly's chagrin. Irving is also displeased with Darryl upstaging him, and challenges him to a magic competition, with the loser being required to give up magic. Scratch is unable to help Darryl, as he gets pulled into the Ghost World for urgent Chairman duties, so Molly reluctantly assists Darryl instead. He overhears Irving, down to his last trick, giving a heartfelt pep talk to his assistant pigeon, and decides to let Irving win the competition, noting that Irving is much more dedicated to performing magic, whereas Darryl is only doing it for money. Irving attempts a dangerous escape trick, but his pigeon is too tired to help, until Scratch returns and possesses it. He helps Irving escape at the last second, and Darryl declares Irving the winner.
38	18	"F.O.N.A.A.!"	Sam King	Mariam Girgis	Alayna Cabral	November 18, 2023 (Note: This episode was first released on Disney+ on November 15, 2023.)	219	0.18
38	18	"Game On"	Stephen Heneveld	Sammie Crowley	Waymond Singleton	November 18, 2023	219	0.18
Molly is too scared to go to the dentist, as she is terrified of its mascot. Scratch curses her to stop feeling fear for 24 hours, and she walks into the dentist's office by herself. After her appointment, she spends the day doing reckless things, including skipping class, bailing out on detention, and performing dangerous stunts. As the curse nears its end, Molly plans to launch herself over Brighton wearing an inspirational banner. Scratch desperately tries to stall her out of it, but Molly launches herself anyway. Her fear returns while she is in mid-air, and she panics, but Scratch catches her. However, a bird interferes and they crash-land, causing Molly to chip her tooth. She goes to the dentist again, but this time decides to do it bravely. Principal O'Connor scolds Darryl for not participating in team sports in gym class, and tries to make him join the school's Turnipball team. Darryl instead suggests making an e-sports team, and bets O'Connor that his team can win a game on the first try. Molly, Libby and Scratch (who is possessing half of Molly's body) join Darryl's team. Darryl keeps trying to win the game by himself; however, he runs down to his last life on the final boss, and asks for help. Together, they defeat the boss (who is being controlled by O'Connor) and win the game, though Darryl is annoyed to realize that this was a scheme by O'Connor to teach him teamwork.
39	19	"White Christmess"	Stephen Heneveld	Sammie Crowley	Megan Fisher	December 1, 2023	209	0.14
39	19	"Perfect Day"	Johnny Castuciano	Brandon Hoang	James Suhr	December 1, 2023	209	0.14
Molly decides to throw a party for the elderly folks at the town's senior home, and hopes for it to snow. Scratch realizes that he hadn't gotten a gift for Molly yet. When the family goes to the senior home, they start setting up the party with festive decorations. Meanwhile, Scratch tries to think of a gift, and eventually gets a llama and makes a fake backstory for it. As the day goes by, the chances of snow decrease, going all the way down to -5% chance of snow. The elderly folks are tired of waiting, and they go ahead and enjoy the snow-less party. Scratch brings the llama to the party, but when he sees Molly sad about there being no snow, he goes up into the sky and makes himself into snow, "enhappifying" everyone there. When Molly wakes up for New Year's Day, she thinks that having a perfect day means a perfect new year. She starts the day good, but falls in a puddle. She decides to ask Scratch to curse her to restart the day if something goes wrong, and once she has the perfect day, the curse will be broken. She restarts the day, and is happy the curse works. She goes down for breakfast, but Darryl bought a pancake maker that goes crazy and hits everyone in the face. Molly restarts the day again, and does more adventures. This happens over and over again, and, during those days, she went ice-skating, watched Time Loop Rodent, went ice-skating again, accidentally set fire to Libby's bookstore, and other crazy events. Eventually, she goes insane, and she becomes one with the very same puddle that she fell in before the curse. However, that day ends up going perfect, causing the curse to be broken, and Scratch vows never to eat pancakes, as he ate a lot of pancakes during the time loop.
40	20	"Jinx vs. The Human World"	Sam King & Johnny Castuclano	Sammie Crowley	June VanOtterdyk & Steve Hirt	January 13, 2024	220	0.06
Scratch has made a motorized decoy to get out of his chairman duties. When Jinx discovers this, she takes the Chairman's cloak and uses it to take over the Ghost World and force ghosts to once again spread misery. When Geoff and Jeff inform Scratch of what Jinx had done, Scratch, along with Molly, Darryl, Libby, Ollie and June, become wraiths and go to stop her. However, Jinx anticipated this and traps Molly, having her Sobgoblins feed off of Molly's joy in order to conquer the Living World, forcing the others to flee. With no other options, Ollie and June try to get their parents help, but this is made difficult when Ruben recognizes Geoff as the ghost who scared him as a child (though it turns out Geoff only sneezed on Ruben). Ester and a reluctant Ruben agree to help, while the Ghost Council admit they're fond of Scratch giving Molly the strength to free herself and the other ghosts, who all go to help the others fight Jinx. When Scratch realizes the Sobgoblins can be overfed, everyone shares their joy to make the Sobgoblins burst. Molly and Scratch summon the Ghost Shark to take back the cloak, as June traps Jinx in a canister. Scratch admits everything was his fault and steps down as Chairman, using his powers to send the cloak away to choose someone more capable of the title. The Chens finally accept ghosts as buddies as everyone celebrates their victory.
41	21	"The End"	Stephen Heneveld & David Knott	Bill Motz & Bob Roth	Johnny Castuciano, Stephen Heneveld, Sam King & David Knott	January 13, 2024 (Note: This episode was released on YouTube by Disney Channel on the same day, hours before its premiere.)	221	0.06
While Brighton holds a festival to celebrate everything the McGees have done, Scratch has a vision of Adia and his past after he possessed people to eat funnel cake. Molly and Scratch believe eating more funnel cakes will bring back more memories, though Libby and Ollie believe it's something else. When Scratch comes to believe that he and Adia traveled the world together, but still can't remember how he died, Molly interviews Adia via video chat to learn more. Adia tells Molly that "Scratch" was a nickname, and while they had imaginary adventures as kids, they never had one together in real life. She also reveals Scratch is not even dead, shocking Molly and Scratch, but they lose reception before learning more. Libby, Ollie and Geoff arrive, revealing that they discovered that Scratch is actually the wraith of Brighton resident Todd Mortenson. This causes Scratch to remember everything about his life, that he was too afraid to join Adia on her adventures, causing him to become so depressed that his soul left his body, eventually forgetting who he was and forming a new identity as Scratch. After he runs away, and Molly finds him in front of his actual home, she encourages him to take back his body and his old life. He tries to refuse, but when Molly accuses him of still being afraid, Scratch admits he's worried that he'll forget about her if he returns to his body. Molly assures him that, even if he does forget her, she'll never forget him. The two have a heartfelt farewell as Scratch returns to his body. Scratch/Todd happily quits his job and sells his house, and plans on leaving Brighton to go on adventures, but doesn't appear to remember his time as a ghost. He runs into Molly at the bus stop, where she says goodbye to him. He replies with "enhappifying" and calls her "Moll" (Scratch's nickname for her), even though he doesn't know her. Despite being sad about Scratch leaving, Molly, the McGees, Libby, Ollie, June, and Geoff decide to celebrate Scratch's new lease on life. During the credits, photographs show Scratch now living an adventurous life, with the final one showing him reuniting with Adia on a mountain top.

== Shorts ==
=== Chibi Tiny Tales (2021–23) ===
Shortly after the series premiere, The Ghost and Molly McGee joined the Chibi Tiny Tales series.

No.	Title	Original release date
1	"Scratch Haunts the Chibiverse"	October 3, 2021
Scratch is tasked by the Chairman to raise his scare chart, and does so by scaring other Disney Channel characters.
2	"Mansion Madness"	October 8, 2021
Molly and Scratch visit the Haunted Mansion, but their antics start to get on the ghosts' nerves.
3	"Scratch's Sugar Rush"	October 17, 2021
After getting a taste of Halloween candy, Scratch becomes candy-obsessed to the point that he sees everything as candy.
4	"The War of Décor"	April 3, 2022
Molly and Scratch go back and forth redecorating their room, each one trying to make it fit their personal tastes.
5	"Springtime for Mama Scratch"	May 1, 2022
As Spring begins to bloom, all the baby animals mistake Scratch for their mothers.
6	"Scratch, Molly's Third Wheel"	April 15, 2023
At a concert, Scratch tries to find another friend to sit with when Molly sits with Ollie.

=== Broken Karaoke (2021–22) ===
Part of the Broken Karaoke series that was started by Big City Greens.

No.	Title	Online release date
1	"Broken Scary-oke"	December 5, 2021
Scratch sings his own versions of "We Wish You a Merry Christmas" and "I Have a Little Dreidel".
2	"I Just Wanna Eat Bread"	August 13, 2022
Scratch and Molly sing their own version of "Exceptional Zed" from Zombies 3 by singing about how much they love bread and salad.
3	"Ways We Feel Anxious"	October 10, 2022
Libby teams up with Candace from Phineas and Ferb, Marcy from Amphibia and Gloria from Big City Greens to form The Stress Girlz and sing "Ways We Feel Anxious", a parody of "Ways to Be Wicked" from Descendants 2.

=== Theme Song Takeover (2022–23) ===
As part of a promotional campaign, Disney Channel began airing the Disney Theme Song Takeover wherein supporting characters from different shows performed the theme song to the series they were in.

No.	Title	Online release date
1	"Andrea Theme Song Takeover"	June 12, 2022
Andrea attempts to take over the show with The Most Fab Andrea Show, much to Molly and Scratch's displeasure. However, Scratch has the last laugh as he scares away a pony, resulting in the dismantling of Andrea's vain efforts.
2	"Libby Theme Song Takeover"	May 3, 2023
Molly and Scratch try to convince Libby to do a theme song takeover due to it being highly requested, but she refuses by—ironically (and non-canonically)—singing about why she would never do one, only to faint after realizing she just did.
3	"Darryl Theme Song Takeover"	June 24, 2023
Darryl gets his own Theme Song Takeover to advertise his business "opportunities" (which are really scams). He gets in trouble when Pete texts Molly to tell her that the family's car was sold to Principal O'Connor but manages to get away, much to the dismay of Molly and the admiration of Scratch.

=== Disney Random Rings (2023) ===
No.	Title	Online release date
30	"Scratch Calls the Haunted Mansion"	September 25, 2023
Scratch wants to move into the Haunted Mansion, but in order to book a stay, he needs to get a referral from one of the residents, none of whom appear all too happy to hear from him after he used Madame Leota’s crystal ball as a bowling ball, borrowed the Hatbox Ghost’s tophat and gave him ghost lice, not remembering to bring a gift to all of Constance Hatchaway’s weddings, and ruined Uncle Theodore’s bust. Scratch is ultimately rejected by all 999 ghosts and is forced to continue living with the McGees. Notes: This is actually the thirtieth episode in the Random Rings series, as well as the longest one. This is also the first episode to have credits.

=== How NOT To Draw (2024) ===
No.	Title	Original release date
1	"How NOT To Draw: Scratch"	February 24, 2024

== Production ==
The animated series was first conceived by co-creators Bill Motz and Bob Roth in 2007. The two of them had worked at Disney for years, with their first ever script being an episode of Darkwing Duck. At the time, the series was known as The Curse of Piper McGee and initially focused on the titular girl's family moving to Transylvania where she was cursed by a vampiric ghoul simply named the Count. This version of the show was initially first pitched to Nickelodeon who passed on it. After fourteen years, the duo had completed work on Lego Star Wars: The Freemaker Adventures when Disney signed them an overall deal. They re-pitched the series, with the new title of The Curse of Molly McGee, where it got a positive response this time.

On July 23, 2019, Disney Channel greenlit the series, which was to be produced by Disney Television Animation, and executive-produced by Motz, Roth, and Steve Loter. On September 24, 2020, Ashly Burch and Dana Snyder joined the series in its lead roles. The same day, the series was retitled The Ghost and Molly McGee.

The crew used several songs as inspiration from the series. Motz released a playlist featuring those songs throughout 2020 and part of 2021.

On January 14, 2024, one day after the final episode aired, Motz revealed that despite getting an order for ten season three scripts, Disney chose to end the show due to low ratings on Disney+. Motz and Roth were granted an additional episode to give the show a proper send-off. Sixteen days later, eighteen scripts and outlines for the cancelled season three were posted online in their entirety to the Internet Archive.

== Music ==
Music from The Ghost and Molly McGee

Soundtrack album by Various
- Released: October 1, 2021
- Recorded: 2020–2021
- Genre: Soundtrack
- Length: 4:44
- Label: Walt Disney

The series' theme song was written by Allie Felder, Mike Kramer, Bill Motz and Bob Roth, and was performed by Ashly Burch and Dana Snyder. Songs for the series are written by Rob Cantor, with each episode featuring a musical sequence of approximately 1 minute. The show's score is done by Michael Kramer. An extended play album of some of the songs from the series was released on October 1, 2021.

=== Track listing ===
All tracks are written by Rob Cantor (except where indicated).

No.	Title	Writer(s)	Performer(s)	Length
1.	"The Ghost and Molly McGee Main Title Theme"	Allie Feder, Bill Motz, Bob Roth & Michael Kramer	Ashly Burch & Dana Snyder	0:39
2.	"Together Forever"		Burch & Snyder	1:05
3.	"Awesome Best Friends Day"		Burch	0:44
4.	"Just Give"		Burch	1:20
5.	"Abraham Lincoln"		Burch & Kelsey Grammer	0:56

== Release ==
The Ghost and Molly McGee premiered on Disney Channel on October 1, 2021. The first five episodes of the series were added to Disney+ on October 6, resulting in episodes 3 to 5 being released prior to their televised premieres. The first episode was uploaded to YouTube on October 2, 2021. The second and final season premiered on April 1, 2023, with the first five episodes of the season being released on Disney+ the following day.

Internationally, the series premiered in Netherlands, Belgium, and Luxembourg on January 31, 2022. It premiered in France and Switzerland the following 2 days. It began airing in Finland and Iceland on February 28. German, Austrian, Swiss, Liechtenstein, Luxembourgish, Schleswig-Holstein, Mecklenburg-Western Pomeranian, and Saarland Disney Channel premiered the series on April 25.

== Reception ==
=== Critical reception ===
The series was well received by critics. Kate Robertson of Stuff described the main characters as a pair forming an "unlikely friendship" who help each other evolve, describing Molly as "an optimist [...] who just wants to make the world a better place" and Scratch as a "pessimist who hopes for the worst", and stated that the series is "funny, charming and an all-round joy to watch". Ashley Moulton of Common Sense Media rated the series 4 out of 5 stars and depicted it as a "funny ghost-girl buddy story...[with] mild ghoulish scares". She also stated that younger kids will be spooked when ghosts transform, but older kids will not, stated that ghosts are "a bit rough around the edges" and there is some cartoon violence. However, she stated that human characters act in a more positive manner, stated that the show's protagonist, Molly, is a "great role model", compared the series to Monsters, Inc. but called it a "charming, sweetly spooky animated series".

=== Accolades ===
Year	Award	Category	Nominee(s)	Result	Ref.
2022	2022 Annie Awards	Outstanding Achievement for Storyboarding in an Animated Television/Media Production	Johnny Castuciano (for "All Systems No")	Nominated	
2022	Children's and Family Emmy Awards	Outstanding Main Title and Graphics	Steve Loter, Dave Knott, Tony Molina, Noel Belknap	Nominated	
2023	Children's and Family Emmy Awards	Outstanding Voice Directing for an Animated Series	Eden Riegel	Nominated	
2024	GLAAD Media Awards	Outstanding Kids & Family Programming or Film – Animated	The Ghost and Molly McGee	Nominated	
