= Matt Hatter Chronicles =

- Genre: Action; Adventure; Science fantasy
- Created by: Nigel Stone
- Written by: Nigel Stone; Simon Furman
- Directed by: Nigel Stone
- Voices of: Tommy Campbell; Larissa Murray; Marcel Mccalla; Kevin Eldon; Ben Small; Dave Benson Phillips
- Composer: Youki Yamamoto
- Countries of origin: United Kingdom; Canada
- Original language: English
- No. of seasons: 4
- No. of episodes: 52

Production
- Executive producer: Nigel Stone
- Producer: Rebecca Channon
- Running time: 22 minutes
- Production companies: Platinum Films; Arc Productions (seasons 1–2); Dream Mill (seasons 1–2); Xentrix Studios (seasons 3–4)

Original release
- Network: Nicktoons & CITV (UK); Teletoon (Canada); TRTÉ (Ireland); Syfy (US)
- Release: 31 October 2011 – 6 December 2015

Matt Hatter Chronicles is a British-Canadian animated series produced by UK's Platinum Films, Arc Productions, and Dream Mill. It began airing on Teletoon on 8 September 2012.

== Synopsis ==
Matt Hatter is an ordinary child who discovers that the monsters of his family's horror movies are alive in another dimension called "the Multiverse", controlled by the nefarious Lord Tenoroc. This dimension can only be accessed through the Notting Hill Coronet, his family's cinema. With his grandfather Alfred trapped inside the Multiverse, Matt, along with his new friends Roxie and Gomez, must capture the movie monsters, save Alfred, and restore peace to the Multiverse.

== Characters ==
=== Main ===
- Matthew Luke "Matt" Hatter (voiced by Tommy Campbell): A 13-year-old boy and a Hatter Hero in Training, who is determined to catch all of the Coronet supervillains and free his grandfather, Alfred Hatter, from his prison cell.
- Roxanna "Roxie" Alexis (voiced by Larissa Murray): A 13-year old pink skinned and magenta haired girl from the Multiverse who is a Tracker of Team Hatter. She wields a staff that was created from the ancient Tree of Life by Gomez, and holds an amber crystal on the end that calls Matt when the Multiverse is in danger.
- Alejandro Diego Gomez Montero (voiced by Marcel McCalla): A 12-year-old boy from the Multiverse who is the Keeper of Team Hatter. He wields a weapon from the Cave of Keepers that used to belong to his father.
- Marlon (voiced by Dave Benson Phillips): A dwarf Tasmanian devil who is Matt's best friend and pet, and loves to eat junk food and sleep. He speaks in a language that Matt and even Roxie understands called "Chittersqueak".

=== Villains ===
- Lord Tenoroc (voiced by Kevin Eldon): The main villain of the show. Lord Tenoroc is the master of all of the Coronet supervillains (except for Primal) and constantly dispatches them to cause chaos throughout the Multiverse. His goal is to destroy the Multiverse and then remake it in his image
- Craw (voiced by Ben Small): A small gargoyle who acts as Tenoroc's minion. He often says the wrong thing, angering Tenoroc.

=== Other ===
- Alfred Hatter: Matt's grandfather, the previous Hatter Hero who is currently trapped in a prison dimension.

== Episodes ==
=== Season 1 (2011–12) ===
No. overall	No. in season	Title	Written by	British airdate	Canadian airdate	Indian airdate=
1	1	"Knights of the Multiverse"	Nigel Stone; Simon Furman	31 October 2011	8 September 2012	TBA
2	2	"Sting of Scorpiotron"	Mark Drop	1 November 2011	15 September 2012	TBA
3	3	"Skull of the Black Raven"	Ken Pontac	2 November 2011	22 September 2012	TBA
4	4	"The Rise of the Mummy"	Ken Pontac	3 November 2011	29 September 2012	TBA
5	5	"The Sand Warrior"	Tommy Campbell	7 November 2011	6 October 2012	TBA
6	6	"Doc Fossil"	Mark Drop	7 November 2011	13 October 2012	TBA
7	7	"Little Box of Horrors"	Cydne Clark; Steve Granat	21 November 2011	20 October 2012	TBA
8	8	"The Maze of the Minotaur"	Ken Pontac	28 November 2011	27 October 2012	19 May 2014
9	9	"The Lost Skeleton Key"	Greg Johnson	5 December 2011	3 November 2012	20 May 2014
10	10	"Twisted Genie"	Mark Drop	12 December 2011	10 November 2012	21 May 2014
11	11	"Fire Phoenix Rising"	Greg Johnson	5 March 2012	17 November 2012	22 May 2014
12	12	"Medusa and the Stone Army"	Ken Pontac	6 March 2012	24 November 2012	26 May 2014
13	13	"Chamber of Doom"	Mark Drop	7 March 2012	1 December 2012	27 May 2014

=== Season 2 (2012) ===
No. overall	No. in season	Title	Written by	British airdate	Canadian airdate	Indian airdate=
14	1	"Werewolf King"	Nigel Stone	9 September 2012	1 July 2014	28 May 2014
15	2	"The Curse of the Crystal Kingdom"	Mark Wilson	16 September 2012	2 July 2014	29 May 2014
16	3	"Captain Lightning"	Simon Furman	23 September 2012	3 July 2014	TBA
17	4	"The Dark Sorcerer"	Simon Furman	30 September 2012	4 July 2014	TBA
18	5	"Raider of the Lost Tomb"	Tommy Campbell	7 October 2012	5 July 2014	TBA
19	6	"Flight of the Witch"	Simon Furman	14 October 2012	5 July 2014	TBA
20	7	"Trick or Treat"	Simon Furman	21 October 2012	9 July 2014	TBA
21	8	"Double Trouble"	Paul McKeown	28 October 2012	10 July 2014	TBA
22	9	"Solar Eclipse"	Simon Furman	4 November 2012	11 July 2014	TBA
23	10	"Heart of a Vampire"	Mark Wilson	11 November 2012	13 July 2014	TBA
24	11	"Monster from the Dark Lagoon"	Simon Furman	18 November 2012	13 July 2014	TBA
25	12	"Night of the Living Dread"	Simon Furman	25 November 2012	13 July 2014	TBA
26	13	"Return of the Shape Shifter"	Simon Furman	2 December 2012	17 July 2014	TBA

=== Season 3 (TBA) ===
No. overall	No. in season	Title	Written by	British airdate	Canadian airdate	Indian airdate=
27	1	"Cell Blaster Reboot"	Simon Furman; Nigel Stone	TBA	TBA	TBA
28	2	"Villain Vault Escape"	Simon Furman	TBA	TBA	TBA
29	3	"Jurassic City"	Simon Furman; Nigel Stone; Phil Walsh	TBA	TBA	TBA
30	4	"Alliance of Evil"	Simon Furman	TBA	TBA	TBA
31	5	"Flight of the Golden Arrow"	Mark Wilson	TBA	TBA	TBA
32	6	"Return to the Future"	Simon Furman	TBA	TBA	TBA
33	7	"The Doom Stone"	Stan Berkowitz; Nigel Stone	TBA	TBA	TBA
34	8	"The Warrior's Code"	Simon Furman	TBA	TBA	TBA
35	9	"Forest of Fears"	Simon Furman	TBA	TBA	TBA
36	10	"Lightning Strikes Twice"	Simon Furman	TBA	TBA	TBA
37	11	"Shrinking Gas"	Simon Furman	TBA	TBA	TBA
38	12	"The Tiger's Eye"	Richard Dungworth	TBA	TBA	TBA
39	13	"The Key of Realms"	Richard Dungworth	TBA	TBA	TBA

=== Season 4 (2015) ===
No. overall	No. in season	Title	Written by	British airdate	Canadian airdate	Indian airdate=
4	1	"On Wings of Doom"	Unknown	September 13, 2015	TBA	April 13, 2015
41	2	"Cave of Keepers"	Unknown	September 20, 2015	TBA	TBA
42	3	"Many Happy Returns"	Unknown	September 27, 2015	TBA	TBA
43	4	"The Root of All Evil"	Unknown	October 4, 2015	TBA	TBA
44	5	"Super Villain Showdown"	Unknown	October 11, 2015	TBA	TBA
45	6	"The Chimes of Chaos"	Unknown	October 18, 2015	TBA	TBA
46	7	"No Strings Attached"	Unknown	October 25, 2015	TBA	TBA
47	8	"Desert of Ice"	Unknown	November 1, 2015	TBA	TBA
48	9	"Ghost in the Chronicles"	Unknown	November 8, 2015	TBA	TBA
49	10	"Hunt for the Amber Dragon"	Unknown	November 15, 2015	TBA	TBA
50	11	"Return of the Witch"	Unknown	November 22, 2015	TBA	TBA
51	12	"All Seeing Eye"	Unknown	November 29, 2015	TBA	TBA
52	13	"The Chaos Coin"	Unknown	December 6, 2015	TBA	TBA

=== TV movie (2018) ===
No. overall	No. in season	Title	British air date
53	5	"Rise of Primal"	April 1, 2018

== Production ==
The series was announced in June 2011, when Nickelodeon UK and Teletoon Canada had ordered a new animated television series from British production company Platinum Films and Canadian outfit Dream Mill with Toronto-based animation studio Arc Productions providing animation services for the upcoming series. Voice acting for the series was primarily recorded at Pinewood Studios in the UK.

In June 2012, Platinum Films announced that they had secured ITV Studios Global Entertainment as the show's licensor in the United Kingdom, Ireland, Australia and New Zealand; where they would handle rights for merchandising, publishing, promotional and home entertainment. In December 2015, Cartoon Network secured licensing rights in the Middle East.

In September 2013 and October 2014, the series was renewed for a third and a fourth season by free-to-air commissioner ITV with Bangalore-based Indian animation studio Xentrix Studios taking over animation production for the final two seasons from Canadian animation studio Arc Productions as Canadian studio Dream Mill dropping out of the series, making the series a full-time British production.

In October 2020, Platinum Films announced that they would transfer worldwide distribution rights to the series from its in-house distribution business to London-based British distribution company Serious Lunch.

=== Broadcast ===
The series has aired on KidsCo's "Syfy Kids" strand in CEE territories, Clan in Spain, Canal Panda in Portugal, Eleven in Australia, TVNZ in New Zealand, Megamax in Central Europe, Disney Channel in Benelux territories, Rai Gulp in Italy and KIDZ and Cartoon Network in Turkey.

It aired on Cartoon Network in India on 19 May 2014. Season 3 premiered on 13 April 2015.

In Arab World it aired on Jeem TV in 2013 and Cartoon Network Arabic in 2014.

== See also ==
- The Amazing Adrenalini Brothers
