= Disney Jr. (Netherlands and Belgium) =

Television channel in Netherlands and Belgium

- Logo used since 1 May 2025 (1 June 2024 for Flanders)
- Broadcast area: Netherlands; Belgium
- Headquarters: Belgium

Programming
- Language: Dutch
- Picture format: 16:9 576p (SDTV)

Ownership
- Owner: The Walt Disney Company (Benelux) BV
- Parent: The Walt Disney Company Limited
- Sister channels: Disney Channel (Belgium); Disney Channel (Netherlands)

History
- Launched: 3 May 2010; 16 years ago (original channel); 1 May 2025; 17 months ago (Netherlands, relaunch)
- Closed: 1 April 2019; 7 years ago (Netherlands, original)
- Former names: Playhouse Disney (2010–2011); Disney Junior (2011–2024)

Links
- Website: tv.disney.nl tv.nl.disney.be

Availability

Terrestrial
- Digitenne (Netherlands): Channel 9 (HD)

Disney Jr. is a Dutch pay television block on Disney Channel and a television station for young children, owned by The Walt Disney Company. It shares its video feed with Disney Junior Scandinavia and featured an additional Dutch audio track for its viewers in the Netherlands and Flanders. It closed down in the Netherlands, but continues broadcasting in Flanders. Viewers in Wallonia, Brussels and Luxembourg receive the French version, from which it shares the same schedule.

== History ==
On 3 May 2010 Disney Junior was first launched as Playhouse Disney in the Netherlands and on 22 June in Belgium. It also launched under the same name as a block on the main Disney Channel, replacing Jetix Play Before 10 September 2011, this channel was called Playhouse Disney, the last show as Playhouse Disney was Special Agent Oso at 6:30 PM.

In 2018, one third of Disney Belgium's employees were laid off, as Disney decided to move its Benelux subsidiary to France, including among others Disney Channel activities.

Ziggo announced that Disney Junior as a TV channel would close down in the Netherlands on 1 April 2019. Disney Channels Benelux is planning to distribute its programs differently (on Disney+). The Dutch channel continues broadcasting in Belgium.

After a year absence, the channel's programs moved to "Mickey Mornings" on Disney Channel on 17 November 2020.

In April 2025, it was announced that Disney Jr. would relaunch in the Netherlands to replace Disney XD on 1 May.

== Logos ==
2010–2011

2019 (the Netherlands); 2019–2024 (Flanders)

2024–present (Flanders); 2025–present (the Netherlands)

== See also ==
- Disney Jr.
- Disney Channel (Netherlands)
- Disney XD (Netherlands)
- Disney Channel (Belgium)
