= Disney XD (Netherlands) =

Defunct TV channel in Netherlands on Veronica and Flanders

- Final logo used from 1 February 2016 to 1 May 2025
- Broadcast area: Netherlands; Belgium (Flanders; formerly)
- Headquarters: Bergweg 50 Hilversum, Netherlands

Programming
- Languages: Dutch (dubbing); English (subtitled in Dutch; formerly)
- Picture format: 1080i HDTV (downscaled to 16:9 576i for the SDTV feed)

Ownership
- Owner: The Walt Disney Company (Benelux) BV The Walt Disney Company
- Sister channels: Disney Channel

History
- Launched: 2 August 1997; 29 years ago (as Fox Kids); 13 February 2005; 21 years ago (as Jetix); 1 January 2010; 16 years ago (as Disney XD)
- Closed: 1 May 2025; 16 months ago
- Replaced by: Disney Jr.
- Former names: Fox Kids (1997–2005); Jetix (2005–2010)

Links
- Website: tv.disney.nl

Availability

Terrestrial
- Digitenne: Channel 9 (HD)

Streaming media
- Ziggo GO: ZiggoGO.tv (Europe only)

Disney XD was a Dutch children's television channel owned by The Walt Disney Company. It broadcast 14 hours a day between 04:00–18:00, time-where it shared with Dutch TV station Veronica, and was primarily aimed at children roughly between the ages of 7 and 15. The channel used to have a pay television 24-hour feed that was distributed throughout the Netherlands and Belgium (Flanders); however, it was closed down on 31 July 2018. Viewers in Belgium (Wallonia) and Luxembourg received the French feed of Disney XD, which was shut down in 2020.

All series on the channel aired in Dutch, either dubbed or originally produced in that language. However, the 24-hour feed of the network offered an optional English audio track for most programming. Dutch subtitles were distributed through teletext-page 888, as there was no DVB subtitle track available.

Prior to its aforementioned shutdown near the end of July 2018, the 24-hour version of Disney XD used to broadcast certain shows in English subtitled in Dutch, mainly in the evening and night.

== History ==
Disney XD was first launched as Fox Kids in the Netherlands on 2 August 1997 and later it expanded its coverage area to Belgium. Saban International bought Dutch free-to-air television network TV10 in January 1997 and started broadcasting Fox Kids, a joint venture with Rupert Murdoch's News Corporation later on in that same year, making TV10 and Fox Kids a time-sharing channel on terrestrial television; in the daytime it was Fox Kids, and at night TV10.

In 2001 Saban wanted to sell its share in Fox Kids to the News Corporation. In the end, Murdoch decided to sell Fox Kids to The Walt Disney Company so he would have the money to acquire DirecTV. Fox Kids was rebranded as Jetix on 13 February 2005, now time-sharing with Veronica.

On 1 January 2010, the Dutch Jetix channel was rebranded as Disney XD, making it the last Jetix feed to be relaunched under the brand in Europe. One month later, a 24-hour feed of the channel was launched as a pay television network.

In 2012, Disney extensively promoted the 24-hour feed in magazines like Donald Duck and Tina under the banner of "Disney XD Extra". It featured extra programming added after 18:00, when the free-to-air feed closed down to timeshare with Veronica.

On 25 March 2015, Disney XD launched an HD simulcast of the 24-hour feed of the channel, which was available at the time on KPN, XS4All and Telfort.

The 24-hour feed closed on 31 July 2018. Due to this, the channel ceased broadcasting on Belgian carriers. The free-to-air channel time-sharing with Veronica continues to remain available, but only in the Netherlands. As a consequence, there is no optional English audio track anymore, due to that only being available on the 24-hour version.

On 1 May 2025, the Dutch version of Disney XD would become a new version of Disney Jr. in the Dutch market; the previous iteration of Disney Junior closed on 1 April 2019.
