= Tommy Campbell (actor) =

Canadian/Irish stand-up comedian, actor and writer

- Citizenship: Canada; Ireland
- Occupations: Actor; comedian; writer
- Website: tommycampbell.ca

Tommy Campbell (born 6 October 1978) is a Canadian–Irish actor, stand-up comedian and writer.

== Career ==
=== Comedy ===
Campbell regularly serves as the opener for comedian Jim Jefferies during his Canadian tours.

In 2016, Campbell released Hamster Pimp, a stand-up comedy album that charted in the top twenty-five on iTunes and aired on Sirius XM. In 2017, he released "Stupid Shaming", which also airs on Sirius XM. Tommy Campbell has been featured on stand-up comedy shows in England, Ireland, Austria, Mumbai, Scotland, Wales, France, Bahrain, Qatar, United Arab Emirates, Spain, Greece, Croatia, Singapore, Cyprus, Japan, Hong Kong, the Philippines, the United States and Canada. He spent ten years based in London, England where he was a regular at The Comedy Store, London, The 99 Club, The Comedy Cafe, Jongleurs, Headliners, Highlight, Lee Hurst's Backyard Comedy Club, Big Night Out Comedy Clubs, The Funny Side Comedy Clubs and many others.

In 2004 and 2005, Campbell was nominated for a Canadian Comedy Award.

=== Writing ===
Campbell is a member of the Writers' Guild of Great Britain. He wrote and starred in the SXSW award-winning 'Clone' commercial for Walmart and his screenplay "The Vile" was a "winner" at the 2011 Nevada Film Festival. He is an original member of the Funny or Die Community where he contributes videos as a writer/director. His videos "Deuce Bag", "Undercover Boss – Pimp", and "Saxophone Hero" have been featured on the front page of Funny or Die. His latest short film, Secret Agent Problems, had multiple screenings around the world including the Calgary International Film Festival, London International Film Festival, Just for Laughs, Cinevic, Singapore Film Festival and the Muskoka International Film Festival.

Campbell regularly contributes to the HuffPost.

Campbell has also published a comedy book, The Slacker Confessions, in 2003.

== Works ==
=== Films ===
Year	Title	Role	Notes
2001	Coil	Detective Len Bias	
2008	The Dark Knight	Passenger	
2010	Green Zone	Chopper Comms Commander	
2012	Hyde Park on Hudson	Hungry Driver #2	
2014	Edge of Tomorrow	Drop Ship Pilot	
2019	The President's Staff	Dan Dale	

=== Television ===
Year	Title	Role	Notes
1999	Angel Links	Kosei Hida	Voice for English version; 12 episodes
2000	Ayashi no Ceres	Aki Mikage	Voice for English version; 23 episodes
2007	George Stroumboulopoulos Tonight	Himself	
2009	The Philanthropist	Agent Aaron Logan	1 episode
2011–2015	Matt Hatter Chronicles	Matt Hatter	Main role, 52 episodes
2011	Doctor Who	Sergeant	1 episode, "Day of the Moon"
2011	MI-5	US Marine	1 episode
2012	Bad Education	Self Defence VO	1 episode
2014	Supernatural	Ric Young	1 episode
2014	Arrow	Lead Gunman	1 episode
2017	Alberta Primetime	Himself	
2019	The President's Staff	Dan Dale	

=== Video games ===
Year	Title	Role	Notes
2011	Crysis 2	Staff Sergeant Rainer	
2012	Need for Speed: Most Wanted	SUV Cop	
2013	Crysis 3	Soldiers	
2016	Homeworld: Deserts of Kharak	Gaalsien Catamaran	
2018	Bless Online	Ronan; Various others	
2021	Crysis: Remastered Trilogy		

=== Discography ===
Year	Title	Notes
2016	Hamster Pimp	
2017	Stupid Shaming	
