= Disney Channel (France) =

French children's television channel

- Logo since 29 August 2022
- Country: France
- Broadcast area: France; Switzerland (until July 2025)
- Headquarters: Quai Panhard-et-Levassor, Paris, France

Programming
- Languages: French (dubbing); English
- Picture format: HDTV 1080i; SDTV 576i
- Timeshift service: Disney Channel +1

Ownership
- Owner: The Walt Disney Company France
- Sister channels: Disney Jr.

History
- Launched: 22 March 1997; 29 years ago

Links
- Website: tv.disney.fr

Disney Channel is a French television channel owned by The Walt Disney Company France.

The channel was launched on 22 March 1997. It was free with ISPs from April 2011 to April 2020, and returned in some ISPs from January 2025 after leaving its historic distributor Canal+ from which the channel was exclusive in France and Africa.

In 2013, Disney Channel had the largest audience share of thematic pay channels in France (0.8%), according to a study carried out by Médiamétrie.

== History ==
The channel launched on 22 March 1997 at 6:00pm (Paris Time), at its inception, was available as an option on Canal Satellite. The channel used to be ad-free when it launched.

On 2 November 2002, the portfolio of Disney-branded channels in France expanded from one to four channel with the launch of Toon Disney, Playhouse Disney, and Disney Channel +1. The movie channel Disney Cinemagic (later Disney Cinéma) was launched in September 2007 replacing Toon Disney.

After an announcement at the end of November 2006, four Disney channels were available in the Belgian television offer via ADSL Belgacom TV from 1 December 2006.

On 23 October 2007, the Conseil supérieur de l'audiovisuel (lit. 'Superior Audiovisual Council') pinned the various of channels of Disney in France for their programming in 2006. The CSA alerts Playhouse Disney to the lack of investment in French and independent audiovisual production. For Disney Channel, the CSA warns the channel for its lack of investment in independent individual production and puts it on notice regarding its prime-time broadcasting quotas.

On 13 July 2009, Walt Disney Television and NRJ 12 announced an agreement to broadcast Disney Channel exclusives on the NRJ12 channel from 24 August 2009. NRJ 12 will broadcast exclusively over-the-air series produced by Walt Disney Television and will be able to re-broadcast existing series after broadcast on Disney Channel such as The Suite Life of Zack & Cody, Wizards of Waverly Place and Sonny with a Chance.

On 1 April 2011, the channel was launched on IPTV platforms as a basic channel, inspired by its Spanish counterpart. On 19 April 2011, Disney and Free ISP launched a VOD service on Freebox called Disneytek. On 1 May 2011 the channel rebranded its graphical package. On 24 August 2011, Disney Channel and Disney Channel +1 switched to 16:9 format, taking the opportunity to put on a new logo. On 20 September 2011, Disney Channel started broadcasting in high-definition.

In January 2012, it has been the most watched cable/satellite channel with 1.1% (including Disney Channel +1). It is the most watched youth channel.

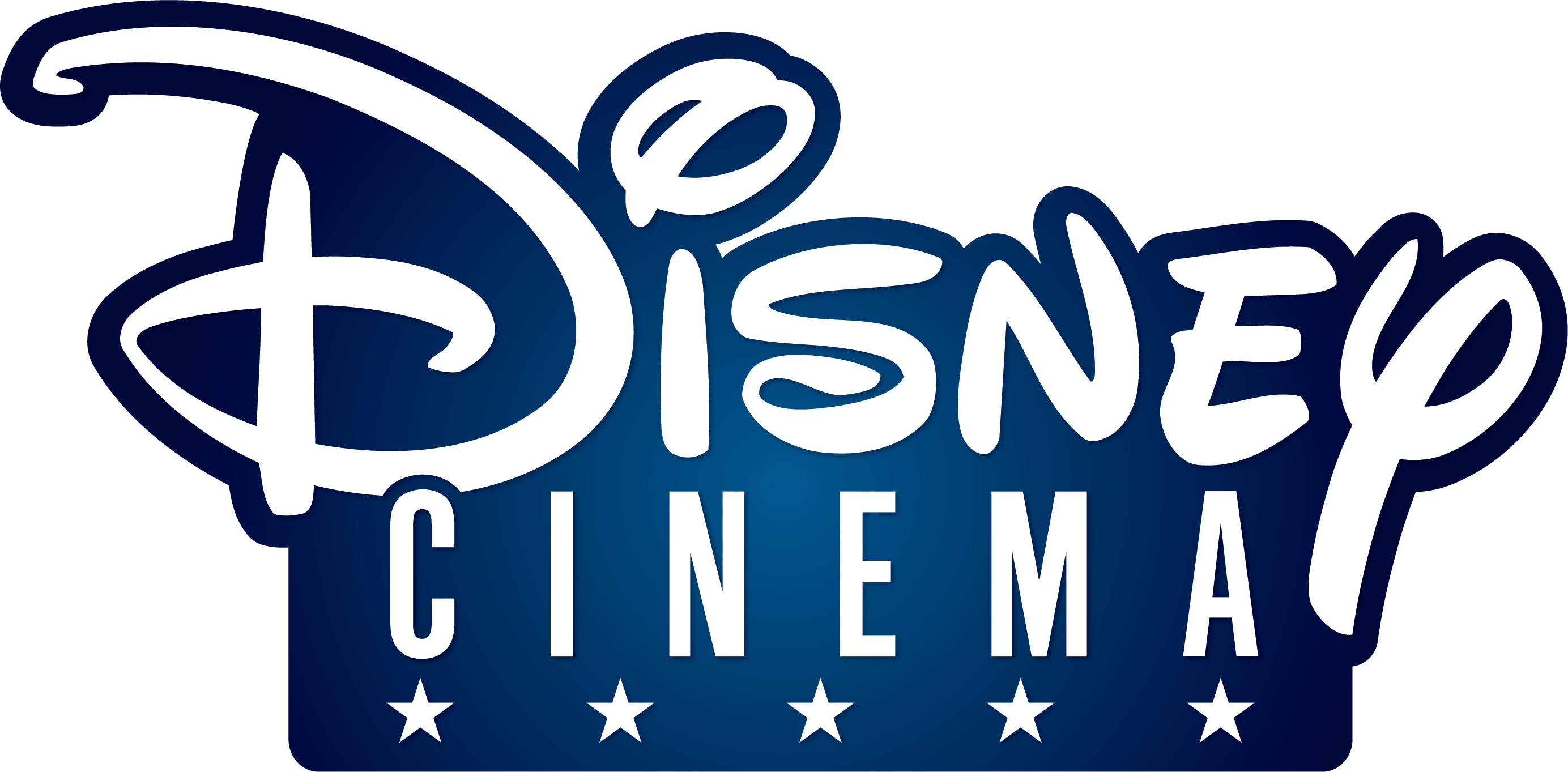

On 29 June 2015, the channel ceased to be offered to Belgians, replaced by a new Belgian version, which have a French and Dutch speaking version. On May 8, 2015, the Disney Cinema channel replaced the previous Disney Cinemagic channel in that area. This service used to sit alongside Disney Channel, Disney Junior and Disney XD (which also shut down in 2020) exclusively on the Canal+ platform. Regular Disney films launch on the channel in the first pay TV window, ten months after their theatrical release. Disney films appear eight months after their theatrical release (22 months for Star Wars films).

The channel had a programming block, Les Grandes histoires de Disney Junior (lit. The Great Stories of Disney Junior), and from 2015 of the Disney XD Zone. The programs of these two channels were only diffused there in their block. The programming blocks disappeared in June 2016.

Disney Channel celebrated its 20th anniversary in France from January to March 2017, notably with the film, Mère et Fille: California Dream, which is the first and only French Disney Channel Original Movie.

In parallel with the French launch of Disney+ scheduled for 24 March 2020, but postponed to 7 April, Disney XD, Disney Cinema and three services (Disney Channel Pop Pick, Disney English and Hola Disney) were shut down, and Disney Channel returned to being a Canal+ exclusive, being removed from Bouygues Telecom on 30 March, Free on 2 April, Orange on 9 April and finally SFR on 30 June.

On 5 November 2024, it was announced that the channel, along with Disney Jr., National Geographic and National Geographic Wild, and Disney+ would leave Canal+ starting 1 January 2025 after failing to renew its exclusive distribution deal. Media outlets called about the closure of the channels, but Disney had not communicated about their fate, and programming had already been scheduled after 1 January 2025, denying its immediate closure. On 20 December 2024, it was announced that the channel would return to the ISP basic offers of Orange along with National Geographic by 2 January after inking its distribution, and Free on 1 January 2025. However, Disney Jr. and National Geographic Wild would cease broadcasts in France, remaining available in Belgium, Luxembourg and Switzerland.

On July 1, 2025, Disney Channel France dropped text for almost all bumpers and idents used on the channel, beginning to rely instead on textless versions, and begun following a schedule closer to the Scandinavian feed. Additionally, coverage of Disney Channel France in Switzerland was replaced instead with its own feed which now follows a schedule closer to its Belgian counterpart, likely as a result of the French Disney Junior still being available in Belgium and Switzerland, as opposed to in France where Disney Junior content now airs on the main channel just like in the Nordic countries.

== Logos ==
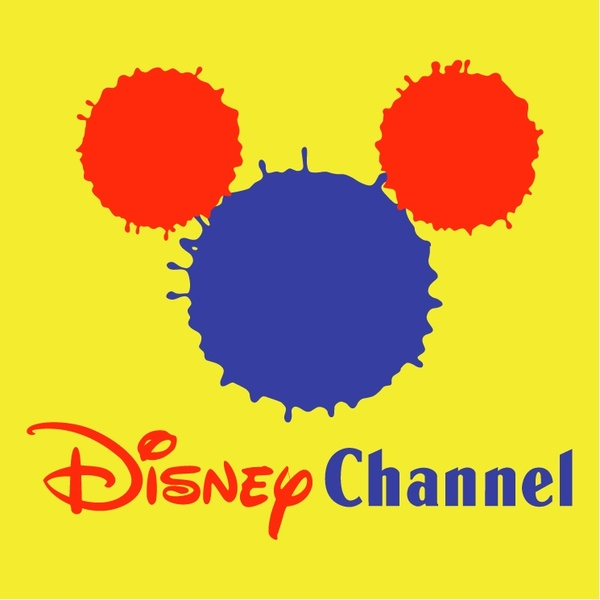
22 March 1997 – 21 June 2003

21 June 2003 – 23 August 2011

24 August 2011 – 29 June 2014

30 June 2014 – 31 March 2017

1 April 2017 – 28 August 2022

28 August 2022 – present

== Programming ==
The channel broadcasts all Disney movies and series, and rebroadcast them several times a year from 6 a.m. to 11 p.m. It offered varied between Disney live-action film and series and Disney animated movies and series, but generally, the programming of Disney films and live-action series and Disney films and animated series was more accentuated on Tuesday evenings, Wednesdays and weekends.

=== Programming blocks ===
==== Current programming blocks ====
- Disney Jr. sur Disney Channel (Disney Jr. on Disney Channel) (since 2001)
- Les Nouvelles Héroïnes (The New Heroines) (since 2017)
- Toon Story (since 2017)
- We Love Family (since 2019)
- Trop School (Too School or Too Much School) (since 2020)
- Disney Channel Party (since 2020)
- Tous avec Miraculous (All with Miraculous) (since 2020)

==== Former programming blocks ====
- Art Attack (1997-2006, now broadcast on Disney Junior)
- Brian O'Brian (2008-2009)
- DC Spot (2016-2019)
- Disney Channel Games (2006-2008)
- Disney Channel Talents (2006-2017)
- Disney XD Zone (2015-2016)
- "Extrasons", "Wazakid" et "Tousskissor" (2006-2007)
- La Nuit du Court (Night of the Court )
- Le Labo des blouses (The Lab Coat) (2001-2003)
- Les Grandes histoires de Disney Junior (The Great Stories of Disney Junior) (2014-2016)
- Les Trésors du sixième sens (The Treasures of the Sixth Sense) (2003-2004)
- Shake It Up Dance Talents (2011-2012)
- Disney Dance Talents (2013-2019)
- Maxi séries
- Star Buzz
- Soy Luna : Le Mag (2016)
- Spot Mag
- Top Gag (2012-2013) (French version of America's Funniest Home Videos)
- We Love Family, la Compil de Satine (2019-2020)
- Zapping Zone (1997-2005)

== See also ==
- Disney Cinemagic
