= Disney Channel (Belgium) =

Belgian feed of Disney Channel

Disney Channel Belgium
- Country: Belgium
- Broadcast area: Belgium; Luxembourg
- Headquarters: Bergweg 50; Hilversum

Programming
- Languages: French; Dutch
- Picture format: 1080i HDTV

Ownership
- Owner: The Walt Disney Company (Benelux) BV
- Sister channels: Disney Jr. (France); Disney Jr. (Belgium)

History
- Launched: 2012 (Flemish independent channel); 29 June 2015; 10 years ago (French feed)

Links
- Website: French website Dutch website

Availability

Streaming media
- Telenet Yelo Play: Yelo Play

Disney Channel is the Belgian version of the same name owned by the Walt Disney Company.

Disney Channel was launched in Flanders on 1 November 2009, as a subfeed from the Dutch version. The Flemish channel was split from the Dutch version in 2012.

For the French part of Belgium, the French version aired in the country until 29 June 2015, when a French Belgian localized feed was launched.

The Flemish and French feeds have the same schedule with their own ad breaks.

== History ==
former logo used from 2012 to 2014

The French version of Disney Channel was launched in Belgium on 31 March 2003 as an option of the digital cable offers with Canal+.

The French Disney channels were added to Belgacom TV on 1 December 2006.

The Dutch version of Disney Channel was launched on 30 October 2009 on Belgacom TV, and on 1 November on Telenet along with the French channel.

Since 2012, the Flemish and Dutch Disney Channel became two separate versions, each with their own programming.

former logo used from 2014 to 2017

A French Belgian feed was launched on 29 June 2015, replacing Disney Channel France except in satellite. The French and Flemish feeds have almost the same schedule, they can have differences like TV shows only dubbed in French like Disney Fam Jam.

The Belgian Disney Channel is available in HD on all its providers.

On 1 April 2025, their Belgian and Dutch counterparts were transferred from Belgium to Spain with the surrender of their Dutch broadcasting licenses and is no longer fall under Dutch media law, and the Dutch legislature and the Dutch Media Authority are sidelined. It also means that these channels are operations of The Walt Disney Company Iberia SL and no longer of the Netherlands-based The Walt Disney Company Benelux.

== Audience share ==
In 2019, the French feed is the 3rd kids-specialized channel in Southern Belgium for the 4–14 years old range, behind Nickelodeon and Disney Junior, and in front of Cartoon Network and Studio 100 TV. All ages combined, the channel is ranked 14th regionally.

The Flemish feed is the 5th kids-specialized channel in Northern Belgium for the 4–14 years old range, behind Nickelodeon, Nick Jr., Studio 100 TV and Cartoon Network, and in front of Disney Junior, VTM Kids and VTM Kids Jr.
