= Disney Jr. (France) =

Television channel in France

- Logo used since 1 June 2024
- Country: United Kingdom (license); France (playout)
- Broadcast area: France (formerly); Belgium; Luxembourg; Switzerland
- Headquarters: 3 Queen Caroline Street, Hammersmith, London (license); Quai Panhard-et-Levassor, Paris, France (playout)

Programming
- Languages: French (dubbing/subtitles); English
- Picture format: HDTV 1080i SDTV 576i (downscaled)

Ownership
- Owner: The Walt Disney Company Limited
- Parent: Disney Branded Television
- Sister channels: Disney Channel

History
- Launched: 2 November 2002; 23 years ago (as Playhouse Disney); 28 May 2011; 15 years ago (as Disney Junior)
- Closed: 31 December 2024; 20 months ago (France)
- Former names: Playhouse Disney (2002–2011); Disney Junior (2011–2024)

Links
- Website: tv.disney.fr/guide-tv/disney-junior tv.fr.disney.be

Disney Jr. is a British-managed French kids television preschool channel owned and operated by The Walt Disney Company Limited, aimed for kids 3 to 7 years old.

It was launched on 2 November 2002, as Playhouse Disney, and rebranded as Disney Junior on 28 May 2011.

== History ==
It was launched on 2 November 2002 as Playhouse Disney, along with Disney Channel +1 and Toon Disney (which was replaced by Disney Cinemagic in 2007), and was previously broadcast 15 hours a day from 6:00 am to 9:00 pm (UTC+01:00).

In July 2010, Disney Channel announced to rebrand Playhouse Disney to Disney Junior. It took place on 28 May 2011, along with the launch of the HD version, making it the first kids TV channel in France to broadcast in HD.

On 5 November 2024, it was announced the channel, along with Disney Channel, National Geographic and National Geographic Wild, and Disney+ would no longer be available on Canal+ starting 31 December 2024 after failing to renew its exclusive distribution deal. On 20 December 2024, distribution deals were announced with Orange and Free, including only Disney Channel and National Geographic for their basic offers. Disney Jr. and National Geographic Wild thus both closed in France for exclusive distribution through Disney+, while both channels continue broadcasting on other providers in Belgium, Switzerland and Luxembourg.

== Logos ==
2002–2011; 2006–2011 (Wallonia)

2019–2024

2024 (France); 2024–present (Wallonia and Switzerland)
