= Disney Channel (Netherlands) =

Dutch edition of the Disney Channel

- Logo since 22 August 2022
- Country: Netherlands
- Broadcast area: Netherlands; Belgium (satellite)
- Headquarters: Bergweg 50, Hilversum

Programming
- Languages: Dutch (dubbing/subtitles); English
- Picture format: HDTV 1080i; SDTV 576i, 16:9 (downscaled)

Ownership
- Owner: The Walt Disney Company (Benelux) BV
- Sister channels: Disney Jr. (Netherlands)

History
- Launched: 3 October 2009; 16 years ago

Links
- Website: tv.disney.nl

Availability

Streaming media
- Ziggo GO: ZiggoGO.tv (Europe only)
- KPN iTV: KPN iTV (Europe only)
- XS4All: WebTV (Netherlands only)
- Online.nl TV app: Watch live (Netherlands only)

Disney Channel is the Dutch version of the same name owned by the Walt Disney Company. The channel is broadcasting pay television, and all content is dubbed in Dutch. The channel features a mix of original sitcoms, teen drama series, animation movies and original movies (presented as DCOMs). English audio is also available on the operators Ziggo, Canal Digitaal, TV Vlaanderen, Caiway, Proximus and Telenet. There are two different versions with local advertisements. While currently not using a slogan, the tagline 'Dat moet je meemaken!' (English: 'You have got to experience this!') has been used in the past.

Since 2012, a dedicated version is proposed for Belgium (except on satellite).

== History ==
The channel first launched on UPC Netherlands on 3 October 2009. On 30 October 2009 it launched in Flanders on Telenet and Belgacom. On 22 June 2010 it was added to analogue. In September 2011 the Playhouse Disney block became Disney Junior. On 1 September 2011 it launched on Ziggo. The channel was scheduled for a release on Caiway in October 2011, but that has been cancelled.

In early 2012 hours were expanded and a new logo was adopted. On 16 August 2012 it launched on CanalDigitaal and TV Vlaanderen at Astra 23.5 East. In July 2013 subtitled programs were moved to late night. In October 2013 subtitled programs were moved to the weekend nights. On 1 April 2014, Disney Channel started transmitting with dual audio channels (Dutch and Original). There are standard no Dutch subtitles, however in most cases subtitles can be activated with text page 888.

Disney Channel, 24 hours version of Disney XD and Disney Junior became available on KPN Interactive TV and on KPN's subsidiary Telfort on 2 April 2014. However, the Disney channels are solely in Dutch dub on these two operators. It is currently unknown when the original English audio channel will become available on KPN.

From 25 March 2015 Disney Channel HD and Disney XD HD is available at KPN, XS4All and Telfort.

From 1 July 2015 Disney Channel HD, 24 hours Disney XD and Disney Junior become available through Caiway and Caiway Albrandswaard. However, in Albrandswaard only the SD version of Disney Channel is available.

On 2 November 2015 Disney Channel is available through KPNs web IPTV service KPN Play however it was sooner available for the Play beta testers.

On 1 April 2019, Disney Junior closed in the Netherlands, but was relaunched on 1 May 2025 replacing Disney XD.

== Logos ==
2009–2011

2011–2014

2014–2017

2017–2022

2022–present
