= List of Nat Geo Wild original programming =

The following is a list of television programs currently or formerly broadcast by Nat Geo Wild.

== Current programming ==
- Secrets of the Zoo: Tampa (2020–present)
- The Wizard of Paws (2020–present)
- Primal Combat (2026)

== Former programming ==
=== A ===
- The Adventures of Dr. Buckeye Bottoms (2016–17)
- Africa's Blood River
- Africa's Creative Killers
- Africa's Deadliest
- Africa's Deadliest Kingdom
- Africa's Deadliest: Young Blood
- Africa's Deadly Kingdom
- Africa's Hidden Wonders
- Africa's Hunters
- Africa's Lost Eden
- Africa's Super Snake
- Africa's Wild Kingdom: Reborn
- Africa's Wild Side
- Africa's Wild Side: Dynasties
- Africa's Wild West
- Alaska And Beyond: Big And Small
- Alaska and the Wilds Beyond
- Alaska's Deadliest: Preator Prowl
- Alaska's Glacier Bay
- Alaska's Grizzly Gauntlet
- Aloha Vet (2015)
- Alpha Dogs
- The Alps: Winter's Fortress
- The Amazing Spider House
- Amazon Underworld
- Amazon's Electric Fish
- Amazonia
- America The Beautiful: Mighty Northwest
- America The Beautiful: Wild Frontier
- America The Beautiful: Wild Southwest
- America the Wild (2012–16)
- America's Funniest Home Videos: Animal Edition (2021–22)
- America's Greatest Animals
- America's National Parks
- America's National Parks: Bears
- America's Super-snake
- America's The Beautiful: Southwest
- America's Wild Frontier
- America's Wild Spaces
- American Chimpanzee
- American Tiger
- Among the Great Apes with Michelle Yeoh (2009)
- Anaconda: Queen of the Serpents
- Anaconda: Silent Killer
- Animal ER (2016–17)
- Animal Fight Club (2013–18)
- Animal Fugitives
- Animal Intervention
- Animal Storm Squad (2016)
- Ark of Stone: The Voyage of Sardinia
- Asia's Wild Secrets
- Attack of the Big Cats
- Austria's Wild Heritage: One Country Six National Parks

=== B ===
- Badlands
- Battle for the Pride
- Battle of the Swamp Dragons
- Bavaria's Alpine Kingdom
- Be The Creature
- The Bear Evidence
- Bearhood
- Behind Russia's Frozen Curtain
- Big Animal Hunt with Filip Badrov
- Big Blue
- Big Cat Games
- Big Cat Odyssey
- Big Cat Odyssey: Revealed
- Big Cat Week (2012–17, 2022)
- Big Cats of The Timbavati
- Biggest and Baddest with Niall McCann
- Bird Nation
- Birth of A Pride
- Bite Me with Dr. Mike Leahy
- Bite, Sting, Kill
- Bizarre Dinos
- Black Mamba: Kiss of Death
- The Blind Monkey
- Blood Rivals: Lion vs. Buffalo
- Blue Collar Dogs (2011)
- Bonecrusher Queens
- Born In Africa
- Born In Africa: Survivor School
- Born In Africa: The Circle of Life
- Born Wild
- Borneo's Secret Kingdom
- Borneo's Secret Kingdom: Weird and Wild
- Boss Croc
- Brutal Killers
- Built for the Kill (2001–04)

=== C ===
- California's Wild Coast
- Call of the Baby Beluga
- Cameramen Who Dare
- Cannibal Sharks
- Cat Attack-tics
- Cat Wars: Lions vs. Cheetah
- Catching Giants
- Caught Barehanded
- Caught in The Act
- Caught on Safari: Battle at Kruger
- Cecil: The Legacy of a King
- Cesar Millan: Better Human Better Dog (2021–24)
- Cesar Millan's Leader of the Pack (2013)
- Chasing Rhinos
- Cheetah: Against All Odds
- Cheetah: Blood Brothers
- Cheetah: Fatal Instinct
- Chimp Diaries
- Chimps Unchained
- Chimps: Nearly Human
- China's Wild Empire
- China's Wild Side
- China's Wild Side: Hidden Worlds
- Clan of the Meerkat
- Clash of the Crocs
- Clash of Tigers
- Cliffhangers
- Cobra Mafia
- Cougars: Ninja of Jackson Hole
- Cougar vs. Wolf
- Counting Tigers
- Critter Fixers: Country Vets (2020-24)
- Crittercam
- Croc Ganglands
- Croc Labyrinth
- Crocodile King
- Crocodiles Revealed
- Crocpocalypse
- Crocs of Katuma
- Cuba's Secret Reef

=== D ===
- Dangerous Encounters with Brady Barr (2005–12)
- Dark Side of Chimps
- Dead By Dawn
- Deadliest Bite Force
- Deadly 60
- Deadly Game
- Deadly Instincts
- Deadly Snakes of Asia
- Deadly Summer
- Deadly Super Cat
- Deep Sea Killers
- Deep Sea Killers: Into the Dark
- Desert Lands of the Middle East
- The Desert Sea
- Destination Wild
- Diary Of a Teen Leopard
- Dino Autopsy
- Dino Bird
- Dive to Tiger Central
- Do Or Die: The Animals (2016-19)
- Dog Impossible (2020–21)
- Dog Whisperer with Cesar Millan (2004–16)
- Dogtown (2008–10)
- Dolphin Army
- Dolphin Dynasty
- Dr. K's Exotic Animal ER (2014–23)
- Dr. Oakley, Yukon Vet (2014–23)
- Dr. T, Lone Star Vet (2019)

=== E ===
- The Eagles
- Elephant: King of The Kalahari
- Elephant Mountain
- Elephant Queen
- An Elephant's World
- Equator's Wild Secrets
- Eternal Enemies: Lions And Hyenas
- Europe's Last Leopard
- Europe's Last Wilderness
- Europe's New Wild
- Europe's Wild Islands
- Expedition Grizzly
- Expedition Wild
- Extinction Sucks
- Extraordinary Birder With Christian Cooper
- Eye of the Leopard

=== F ===
- Fairy Penguins
- Farm Dreams (2022)
- Feast Of The Grizzly
- Fish My City
- Fish Tank Kings
- Fishbowl
- The Flood
- Frozen Islands
- Frozen Kingdom of The Show Leopard
- Fur Seals: Battle For Survival

=== G ===
- Galapagos
- Game of Lions
- Gangster Jackles
- Giant Carnivorous Bats
- Giant Pandas
- The Giant Robber Crab
- Giant Sea Serpent
- Giants of the Deep Blue
- Giraffe: African Giant
- Girl Power
- Give Me Shelter
- Golden Seals of Skeleton Coast
- Gone Wild
- Gorilla Murders
- Gorongosa: Paradise Reborn
- Great Barrier Reef
- The Great Elephant Gathering
- Grizzly Cauldron
- Grizzly Empire

=== H ===
- The Hatcher Family Dairy (2021)
- Haunt of the Hippo
- Heartland Docs, DVM (2020-23)
- The Hidden Kingdoms of China
- Hidden Wonders of Europe
- Hidden Worlds
- Hippo Hell
- Hippo vs. Croc
- Hippos: Africa's River Beast
- Hippos After Dark
- Hollywood Bear Tragedy
- Hostile Planet: Africa
- How Big Can It Get?
- How Dogs Got Their Shapes
- Hummingbird
- Hummingbirds: Magic in the Air
- Humpbacks: Cracking the Code
- Hunt for the Giant Squid
- Hunter vs. Hunted
- Hunting for Ngotto
- Hunting the Hammerhead
- Hyena Coast
- Hyena Queen
- Hyena: Bone Crushing Queens

=== I ===
- Iberia's Woodlands
- The Ice Bear
- Incredible Bats
- "The Incredible Dr. Pol"
- Incredible Fish
- India's Lost Worlds
- India's Wild Leopards
- Indonesia Beyond the Reefs
- Insect from Hell
- Inside Nature's Giants
- Inside The Pack
- Intimate Enemies
- Into the Abyss
- Into The Okavango
- The Invaders
- Iran's Wild Side
- Is Your Dog a Genius?
- Island of the Monsoon

=== J ===
- Jade Eyed Leopard
- Jaguar Beach Battle
- Jaguar: Catching the Cat
- Jaguars vs. Crocs
- Japan's Hidden Secret
- Japan's Wild Year
- Jean Michel Cousteau's Ocean Adventure
- Jellyfish Invasion
- Journey into Amazonia
- Jungle Animal Rescue
- The Jungle King

=== K ===
- Kalahari Super Cats
- Kangaroo Kaos
- The Kangaroo King
- Killer Dragons
- Killer Instincts
- Killer Seals
- Killer Shew
- Killer Shots
- Killer Snakes
- King Cobra
- King of The Mountains Baboons
- Kingdom of The Apes
- Kingdom of The Apes: Battlelines
- Kingdom of The Blue Whale
- Kingdom of The Forest
- Kingdom of The Meadow
- Kingdom of The Oceans
- Kingdom of The Polar Bears
- Kingdom of The White Wolf
- Kings of the Hill
- Komodo Dragons

=== L ===
- The Lakeshore Killers
- Lake Tanganyika: Africa's Blue Heart
- Land of 10,000 Grizzles
- Land of A Thousand Caiman
- The Last Lioness
- The Last Orangutan Eden
- Legends of the Ice World
- Leopard and Hyena: Strange Alliance
- Leopard Huntress
- Leopard Kingdom
- Leopard Queen
- The Leopard Rocks
- Leopards of Dead Tree Island
- Lion Army: Battle to Survive
- Lion Battle Zone
- Lion Dynasty
- Lion Gangland
- Lion Kingdom
- The Lion Pride Next Door
- The Lion Ranger
- Lion Warrior
- Lions Behaving Badly
- Lions Brothers: Cubs to Killers
- Lions on the Edge
- Lions vs. Giraffe
- Lions: The Hunt For Survival
- Little Giant
- Little Killers
- The Living Edens
- Living with Big Cats

=== M ===
- Madagascar: A World Apart
- Madagascar: Legendary Lemus
- Madagascar: Legends Of Lumar Island
- Malilka: The Lion Queen
- A Man Among Bears
- Man Among Cheetahs
- Man v. Monster (2017–22)
- Man vs. Cheetah
- Man vs. Lion
- Man vs. Octopus
- Man vs. Puma
- Man, Woman, Dog
- Man-Eater of The Congo
- Maneater Manhunt
- Mav vs. Shark
- Mega Hammerhead: Ultimate Predator
- Mexico Untamed
- Mission Critical
- Mission Critical: India's Wild Cats
- Monkey Thieves
- Monster Catfish
- Monster Croc Hunt
- Monster Crocs
- Monster Fish
- Monster Fish of the Congo
- Monster Frog
- Monster Jellyfish Attack
- Monster Snakes
- Monsters of the Wild: Creepy Crawlers
- Monsters of the Wild: Wonderfully Weird
- Morays: The Alien Eels
- Mother Croc
- My Lion Family
- Mystery Monkeys of Shangri-la
- Mystery of the Giant Cave Spider
- Mystery Of The Lynx

=== N ===
- Naked Mole Rat: Nature's Weirdest Superhero
- Namibia's Sanctuary of Giants
- New Wave Warriors
- Ninja Shrimp
- Nkashi: Race for the Okavango
- Nordic Wild

=== O ===
- Octopus Volcano
- Okavango: River of Dreams
- Orca Killing School
- Otter Town
- Out there With Jack Randall (2019)
- Outback Wrangler

=== P ===
- Panda's Goes Wild
- Paradise Islands
- Penguin Death Zone
- Penguinpalooza
- A Penguin's Life
- The Phantom Cat
- Phantom Wolverine
- Philly Undercover
- Planet Carnivore: Perfect Killers
- Planet of the Birds
- Planet of the Reptiles
- Polar Bear Invasion
- Pond Stars
- Pop Goes The Vet (2020)
- Prairie Dog Manor
- Predator Bloodlines
- Predator Fails
- Predator Fails: When They Attack
- Predator Land
- Predators In Paradise
- Predators In Peril
- Predators of the Sea
- Pride
- Pristine Seas: The Power Of Protection
- Project Grizzly
- Project Manta
- Psycho Kitty
- Puma!
- Pumas: At The End Of The World
- Pumas At the End of the World: Rebirth
- Python Hunters
- Pythonathon

=== Q ===
- Queen of The Baboons
- Queen of The Chase
- Quest for the Megafish of the Amazon

=== R ===
- Raccoon Dogs: Alien Invaders
- Raccoon: Backyard Bandit
- Race of Life
- Raptor Force
- Real Angry Birds
- The Real Black Panther
- The Real Serengeti
- Rebel Monkeys
- Red Sea Jaws
- Red Sea, Green Future
- Regime of the Queen
- Relentless Enemies
- Rescue Ink
- Restless Planet
- Return of The Hammerhead
- Return of The Lion
- Return of the Spider Monkey
- Return of the White Lion
- Rhino Rescue
- The Rise of Black Wolf
- Russia's Wild Sea
- Russia's Wild Tiger

=== S ===
- Sahara
- Salmon Wars
- Savage Island Giants
- Savage Kingdom
- Saved by the Lioness
- Saved from the Spill
- Saving Giraffes: The Long Journey Home
- Sea Strikers
- Seahorses
- Search for the Giant Octopus
- Search for the Ultimate Bear
- Searching for the Snow Leopard
- Sebella: The Mircale Cheetah
- Secret Brazil
- Secret Shark Pits
- Secrets of Bull Shark
- Secrets of The Desert Elephants
- Secrets of The Elephants
- Secrets of the King Cobra
- Secrets of the Mediterranean
- Secrets of the Wild
- Secrets of the Zoo (2018–22)
- Secrets of the Zoo: Down Under (2020–22)
- Secrets of the Zoo: The Wild Side (2019–20)
- Secrets of Wild India
- Secrets Of Wild India: Kings of the Jungle
- Serengeti Speed Queen
- Shadow Cats
- Sir Lanka: Leopard Dynasty
- Sky Safari
- Sloth Bears
- Snake City (2014–23)
- Snake Island: Wild & Deadly
- Snake Underworld
- Snake Wranglers
- Snow Leopard of Afghanistan
- Soul of The Cat
- South Africa: Cradle of Killers
- South Africa: Land of Extremes
- South America Untamed
- Space Crabs
- Speed Kills
- Spine Chillers
- Spine Chillers: Vampire Bats
- Squid vs. Whale
- Storm Cats
- Strangest Bird Alive
- Street Monkeys
- Striker!
- Sumatra's Last Tiger
- Super Fish
- Super Predators
- Super Pride
- Super Squirrel
- Survive The Wild
- Surviving The Serengeti
- Swamp Lions

=== T ===
- Taiwan Wild
- Thailand's Wild Cats
- Thailand's Wild Side
- That Shouldn't Fly
- Tiger On the Run
- Tiger Queen
- Tiger Queen of Taru
- Tiger Wars
- Tiger's Revenge
- Titans of the Sea: A Family Affair
- Trails of the Wild
- Tree Climbing Lions
- Turf War: Lions and Hippos
- Trackers

=== U ===
- Ultimate Bear
- Ultimate Cat
- Ultimate Enemies
- Ultimate Hippo
- Ultimate Honey Badger
- Ultimate Philippines: Hidden Wonders
- Ultimate Philippines: Hidden World
- Ultimate Predator
- Ultimate Rivals: Cats vs. Dog
- Ultimate Shark
- Ultimate Viper: Fear the Fang
- United Sharks of America
- Unlikely Animal Friends (2012–15)
- The Unlikely Leopard
- Untamed Americas
- Untamed Philippines
- Ultimate Viper

=== V ===
- Valley Of The Wolves
- Vanishing Kings: Desert Lions of Nambi
- Vanishing Kings II: Desert Lion Legacy
- Victoria Falls: Africa's Garden of Eden

=== W ===
- The Way of the Cheetah
- The Wild West
- Walking With Giraffes
- War Elephants
- War Of The Lions
- Whales of the Deep
- What The Shark?
- When Crocs Ate Dinosaurs
- When Sharks Attack
- Where Oceans Collide
- Wild 24
- Wild Alaska
- Wild Alaska: Arctic Summer
- Wild Amazon
- Wild Antarctica
- Wild Arctic
- Wild Argentina
- Wild Argentina: Extreme Earth
- Wild Arctic: Kingdom Of The Ice
- Wild Asia
- Wild Atlantic
- Wild Australia
- Wild Australia: Kangaroo King
- Wild Australia: Will to Survive
- Wild Bahamas
- Wild Botswana
- Wild Botswana: Lion Brotherhood
- Wild Canada
- Wild Canada: Legends of The North
- Wild Caribbean's Deadly Underworld
- Wild Cats of India
- Wild Central America
- Wild Chile
- Wild China
- Wild Coast
- Wild Columbia
- Wild Congo
- Wild Costa Rica
- Wild Detectives
- Wild Dog Diaries
- Wild Dolphins
- Wild Dubai
- Wild Egypt
- Wild Far East
- Wild Florida
- Wild France
- Wild Galapagos
- Wild Great Britain
- Wild Great Britain: Animal Tales
- Wild Hawaii
- Wild Hunter's: Deadly Killers of Africa
- Wild Hunters
- Wild India
- Wild India: Land of Wounders
- Wild Indochina
- Wild Islands
- Wild Japan
- Wild Japan: Snow Monkeys
- Wild Kalahari
- Wild Korea
- Wild Lapland
- Wild Little Cats
- Wild Mississippi
- Wild Mongolia: Land of Extremes
- Wild New Zealand
- Wild New Zealand: Lost Paradise
- Wild Nights
- Wild Nordic
- Wild Persia
- Wild Peru: Andes Battleground
- Wild Peru: Fight for Life
- Wild Philippines
- Wild Portugal
- Wild Russia
- Wild Scotland
- Wild Scotland: Highlands
- Wild South Africa
- Wild Southwest
- Wild Sri Lanka
- Wild Taiwan: Jungle Island
- Wild Thailand
- Wild Uganda
- Wild Untamed Brazil
- Wild Venice
- Wild Winter
- Wild Year: Siberia
- Wild Yellowstone
- Wild Yellowstone: Fire and Ice
- Wild Yellowstone: She Wolf
- Wildebeeste: Born To Run
- Will Work for Nuts
- Winter Wonderland
- Winter's Hidden Wonders
- The Wolf Mountains
- Wolf vs. Bear
- Wonders of the Ocean
- World of The Wild
- World's Deadliest Crocs
- World's Deadliest Jellyfish
- World's Deadliest Lions
- World's Deadliest Snakes
- World's Deadliest Whale
- World's Deadliest: Jaws & Sins
- The World's Most Famous Tiger
- World's Worst Venom
- Worlds's Weirdest Animal Faces

=== Y ===
- Yellowstone Battleground
- Yellowstone Wolf Dynasty

=== Z ===
- Zambezi
- Zeb's Big Fish: Hammerhead Invasion
- Zebras of the Serengeti
- Zoo Confidential
