= Retention basin =

Artificial pond for stormwater runoff

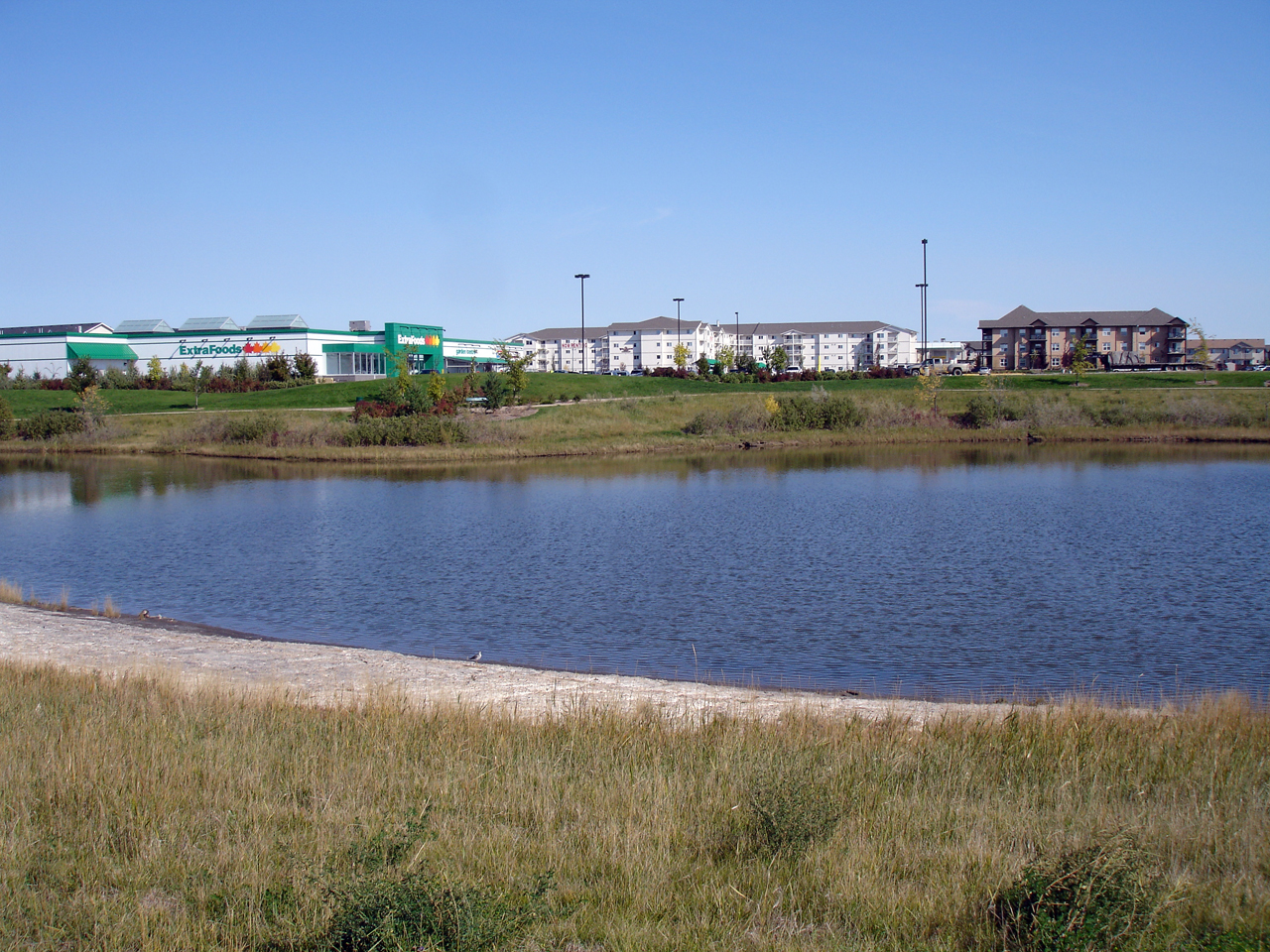
Trounce Pond, a retention basin landscaped with natural grassland plants, in Saskatoon, Saskatchewan, Canada

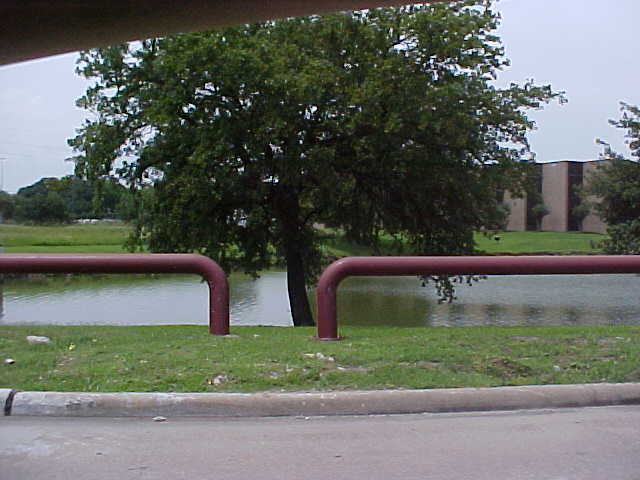
The Corporate Park retention basin in Stafford, Texas, United States

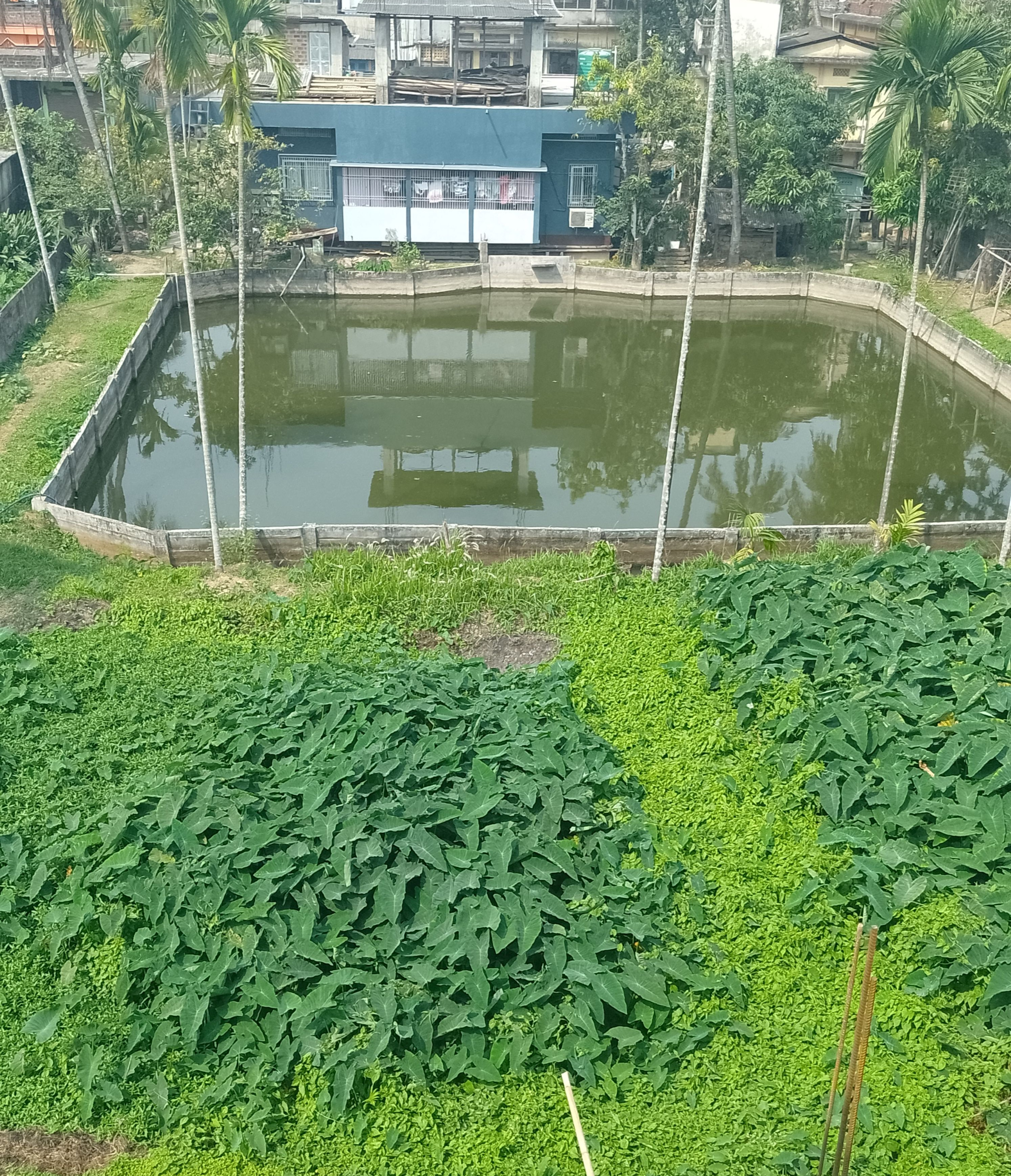
A retention pond guarded by concrete wall and surrounded by taro plants in an semi-urban Indian town

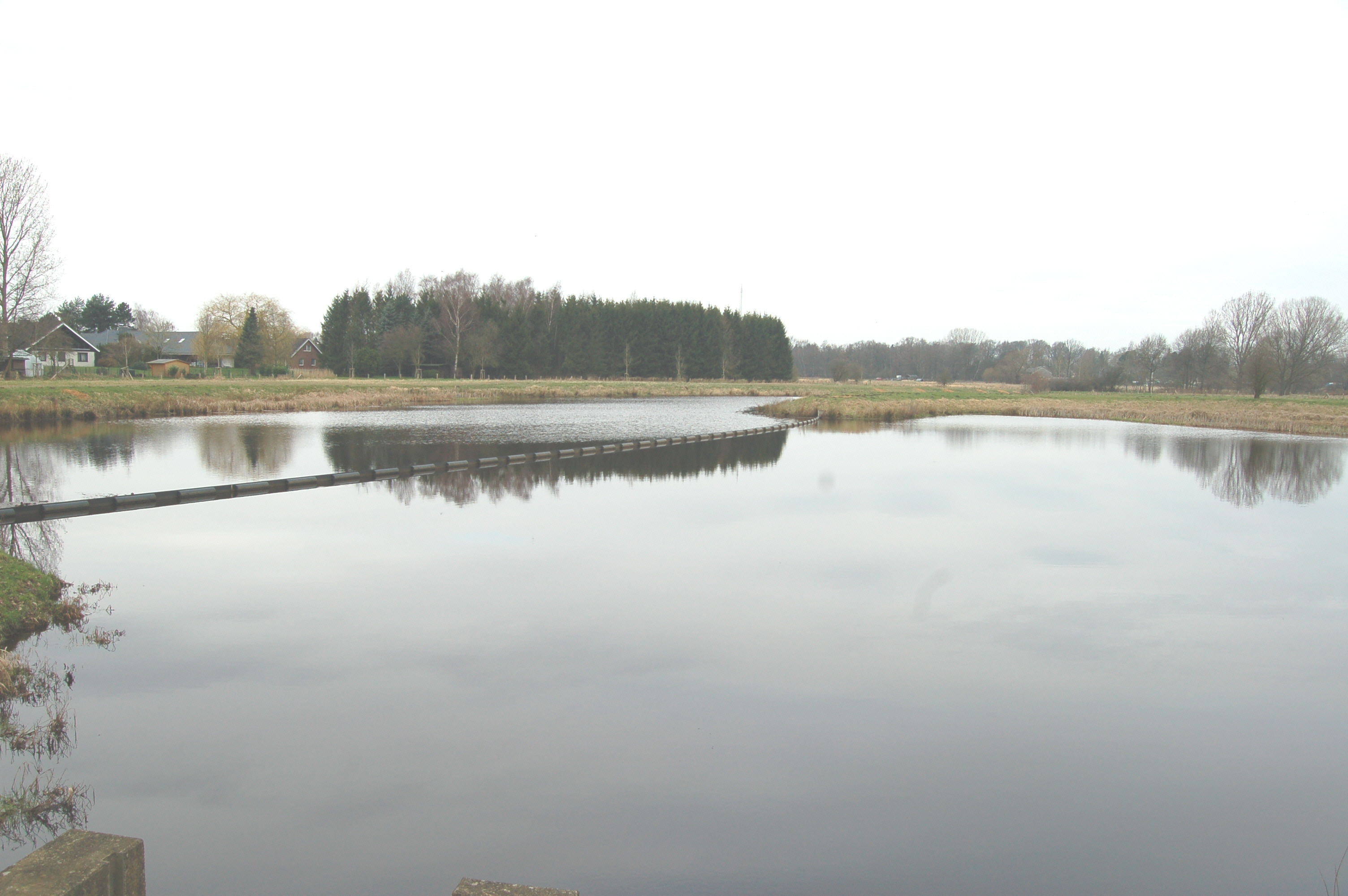
Retention basin in Pinnau, Schleswig-Holstein, Germany

A retention basin, sometimes called a retention pond, wet detention basin, or storm water management pond (SWMP), is an artificial pond with vegetation around the perimeter and a permanent pool of water in its design. It is used to manage stormwater runoff, for protection against flooding, for erosion control, and to serve as an artificial wetland and improve the water quality in adjacent bodies of water.

It is distinguished from a detention basin, sometimes called a "dry pond", which temporarily stores water after a storm, but eventually empties out at a controlled rate to a downstream water body. It also differs from an infiltration basin which is designed to direct stormwater to groundwater through permeable soils.

Wet ponds are frequently used for water quality improvement, groundwater recharge, flood protection, aesthetic improvement, or any combination of these. Sometimes they act as a replacement for the natural absorption of a forest or other natural process that was lost when an area is developed. As such, these structures are designed to blend into neighborhoods and viewed as an amenity.

In urban areas, impervious surfaces (roofs, roads) reduce the time spent by rainfall before entering into the stormwater drainage system. If left unchecked, this will cause widespread flooding downstream. The function of a stormwater pond is to contain this surge and release it slowly. This slow release mitigates the size and intensity of storm-induced flooding on downstream receiving waters. Stormwater ponds also collect suspended sediments, which are often found in high concentrations in stormwater due to upstream construction and sand applications to roadways.

== Design features ==
Storm water is typically channeled to a retention basin through a system of street and/or parking lot storm drains, and a network of drain channels or underground pipes. The basins are designed to allow relatively large flows of water to enter, but discharges to receiving waters are limited by outlet structures that function only during very large storm events.

Retention ponds are often landscaped with a variety of grasses, shrubs, and/or aquatic plants to provide bank stability and aesthetic benefits. Vegetation also provides water quality benefits by removing soluble nutrients through uptake. In some areas the ponds can attract nuisance types of wildlife like ducks or Canada geese, particularly where there is minimal landscaping and grasses are mowed. This reduces the ability of foxes, coyotes, and other predators to approach their prey unseen. Such predators tend to hide in the cattails and other tall, thick grass surrounding natural water features.

Proper depth of retention ponds is important for removal of pollutants and maintenance of fish populations. Urban fishing continues to be one of the fastest growing fishing segments as new suburban neighborhoods are built around these aquatic areas.

== See also ==
- Balancing lake (UK)
- Nationwide Urban Runoff Program (NURP) – US stormwater research project
- Settling basin – for treating agricultural and industrial wastewater
- Stream restoration
- Surface runoff
- Sustainable drainage system
- Urban runoff
- Water pollution
- Jonenbach flood retention basin
