= Dr. K =

Dr. K or Doctor K may refer to:

- Dwight Gooden (born 1964), American baseball player
- Alok Kanojia (born 1982), American psychiatrist and Twitch streamer
- Brendan Kavanagh (born 1967), English pianist and YouTube personality
- Susan Kelleher, American veterinarian, star of Dr. K's Exotic Animal ER
- Super Doctor K, a manga series by Kazuo Mafune

== See also ==
- DR K, a Danish television station
