= Jonenbach flood retention basin =

Flood retention basin in Canton of Zurich

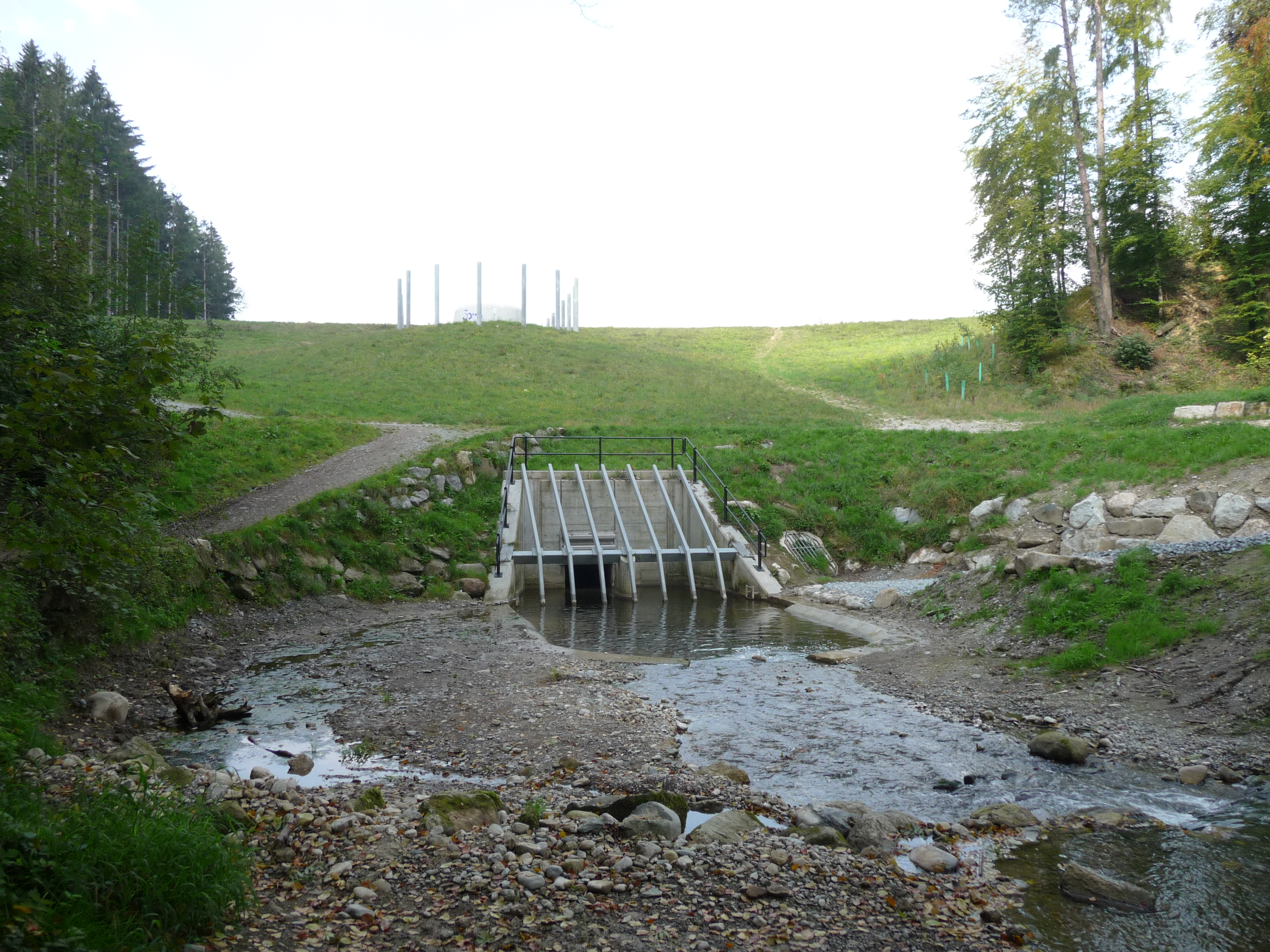
- Inlet structure for the bottom outlet with lake

- Canton of Zurich, Switzerland
- Country: Switzerland
- Location: Canton of Zurich
- Coordinates: 47°16′28″N 8°27′28″E
- Construction began: 2004 to 2007

Reservoir
- Active capacity: 392,000 m³
- Catchment area: 21 km²
- Maximum length: 19.35 meters
- Maximum width: 5 meters

When it was commissioned, the Jonenbach flood retention basin, also known as the Jonental retention basin (German: Hochwasserrückhaltebecken Jonenbach, also Rückhaltebecken Jonental), was among 21 existing and six planned basins in the Zurich canton in Switzerland. It was built to safeguard the communities of Affoltern am Albis and Zwillikon against potential floods from the 17-kilometer-long Jonenbach. The construction of the basin successfully averted two floods in 2007 and 2008. The retention basin above the flood retention dam is referred to as a dry basin or green basin, and it is primarily made up of forest land. During normal water conditions, the stream flows through the dam unhindered. However, during flood events, a portion of the water is temporarily dammed, typically for only a few hours. This construction project involved the Office for Waste, Water, Energy and Air, the Civil Engineering Office, and other cantonal offices.

== Location and geology ==
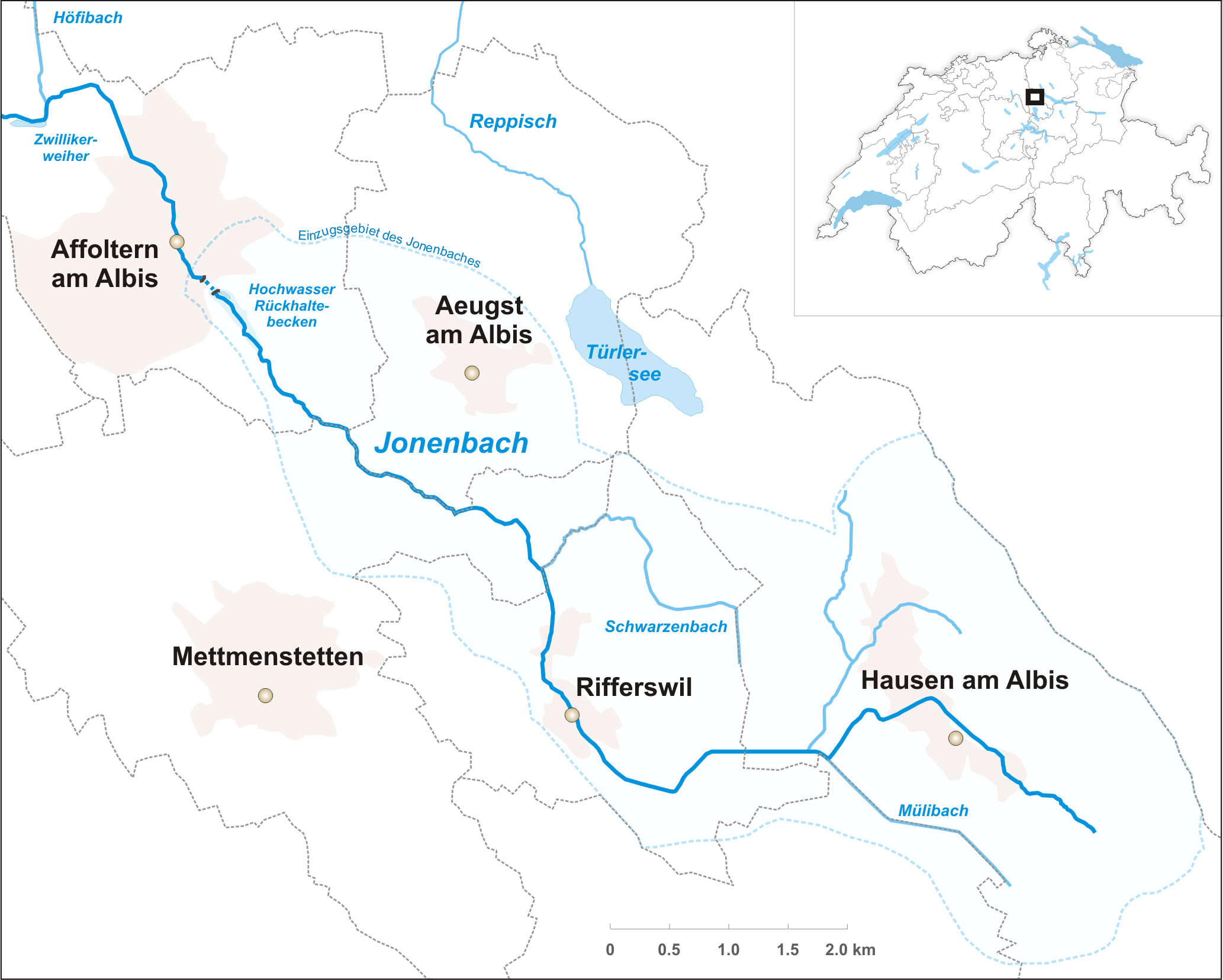
Map showing the location of the retention basin

The retention basin is situated southeast of Affoltern am Albis in the Swiss canton of Zurich, near the municipal borders of Mettmenstetten and Rifferswil. The Jonenbach, flowing from the southeast, traverses the Jonental Valley. Shortly before Affoltern, the valley narrows so that a dam with a relatively low fill volume could be built here. The dam, on the other hand, is very close to the village, and the nearest residence is only about 50 meters away. The catchment area for the water in the Jonenbach above Affoltern spans approximately 21 km².

From a geological point of view, Affoltern lies within the Molasse Basin of the Swiss Plateau, which accumulated sediments composed of the eroded debris from the emerging Alps during the Tertiary period. These sediments can be classified into the Marine Molasse and Freshwater Molasse layers.

== Situation before the construction of the flood retention basin ==
The Jonenbach had been a recurring cause of flooding during periods of high tides before the flood retention basin was built. The local fire department had to defend the community each year by deploying sandbags and pumping out waterlogged basements and garages. These floods were primarily triggered by heavy rainfall, made worse by human development that limited the natural water flow in narrow areas. However, the flood protection proposals presented before 1994 did not gain the municipality's approval. Consequently, the municipality was unable to safeguard itself against the floods.

The municipality incurred damages of at least 11.4 million francs (approximately 7.5 million euros) in the aftermath of the two significant floods that occurred in 1994 and 1999. This figure does not account for the damages sustained in residential and agricultural areas, which were not covered by insurance. Only after these floods occurred, a project that had already proven to be a successful solution in 1982 was pursued. The project proposed the interception of floodwater from Affoltern through the construction of an earth-fill dam in a sizable retention basin.

== Description of the retention basin ==
The retention basin represents a dry basin or green basin and predominantly comprises forested areas. Under normal conditions, during low and moderate water levels, the river's water is allowed to flow unhindered through a culvert in the dam, which has a cross-section measuring 3.80 m × 2.70 m with an inlet restriction of 1.40 m × 0.95 m). However, when heavy rainfall leads to water volumes surpassing the capacity of the dam's bottom outlet (3), a portion of the water is retained and held back by the dam.

Cross-section of the dam : (1) culvert, (2) spillway with driftwood rake, (3) bottom outlet (inlet) with rake and inlet throttling, (4) outlet structure with fish ladder, (5) stilling basin (fast-flowing water is slowed down), (6) footpath, (7) dam crest

The maximum impoundment volume of the dam is approximately 392,000 m³ of water. As a result, the stream above the dam is dammed over a length of about one kilometer and a width of about 150 meters. This elevation of the water level, reaching 513.35 meters above sea level, corresponds to a height that is encountered on average once every 100 years. During this flood, known as HQ100, nearly 34 m³ of water per second flows above the dam. However, through the bottom outlet in the dam, only a volume of approximately 16 m3/s is discharged, which can be safely accommodated by the course of the stream below the dam. Consequently, the dam construction provides an attenuation effect of about 18 m3/s for an HQ100 event.

If the critical water level is exceeded, additional water flows out through the spillway (2) to prevent a further rise in the water level and thus flooding of the dam crest (7). This outflow is directed inside the dam through the actual culvert (1), which has a cross-section of 3.80 v 4.10 m. According to calculations, the spillway is designed to handle an HQ1000 event (a flood that is to be expected once in 1000 years on average) with an inflow of 78 m3/s or even an HQ10000 event with 116 m3/s inflow. This would correspond to a dam level of 1.35 m above the flood inlet structure. Although flooding would then also occur in the community of Affoltern, the amount of water would be significantly reduced compared to the previous situation. In the event of a further rise in the water level, known as the overload case, the discharge would take place through the Neue Jonentalstraße located east of the dam. It is designed to prevent any overtopping of the dam, even in such circumstances.

The actual dam is formed by a fill dam approximately 163 meters long, primarily composed of moraine material and clayey loam.

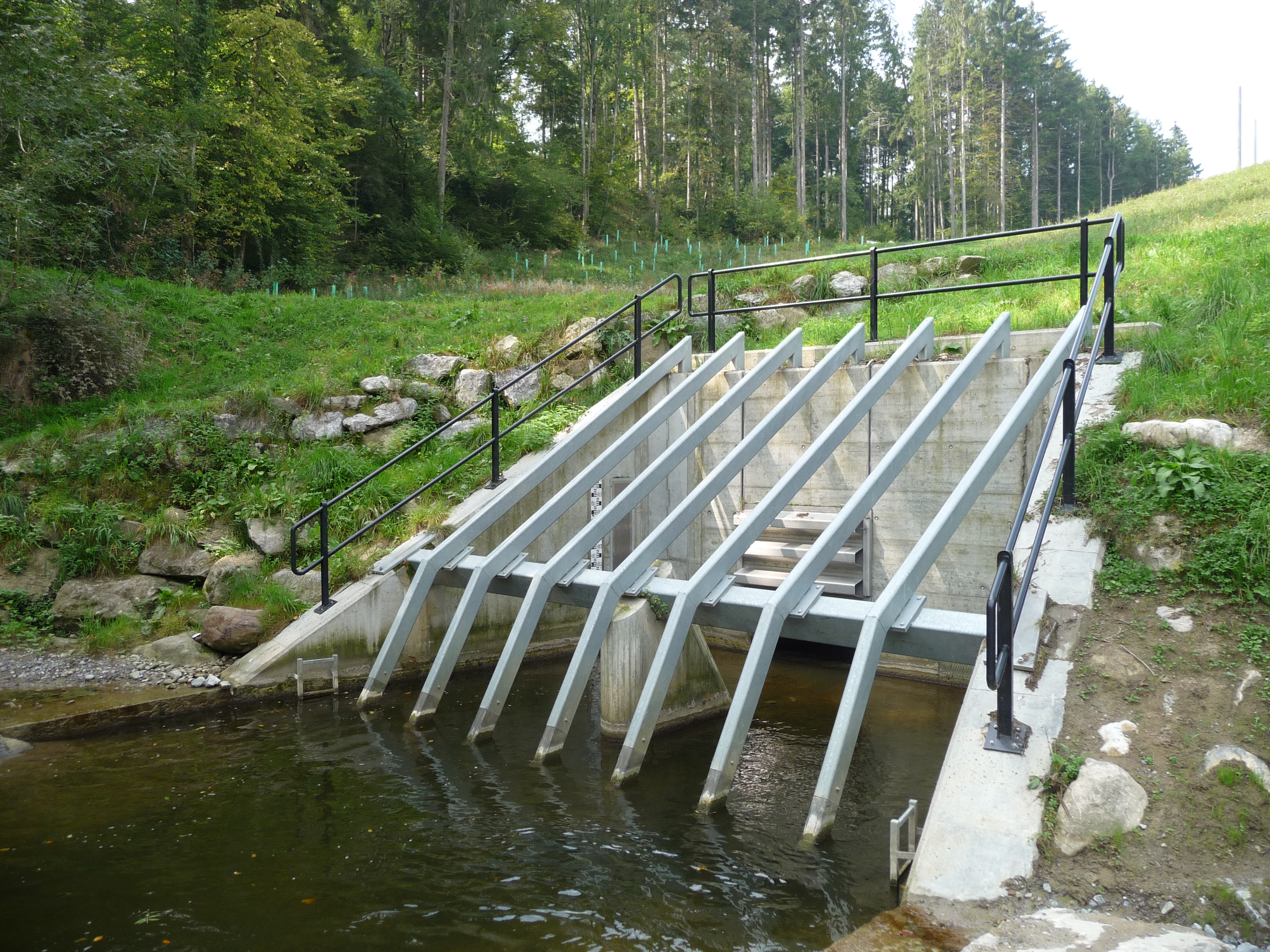
Inlet structure for the bottom outlet (3) with rake and inlet throttling

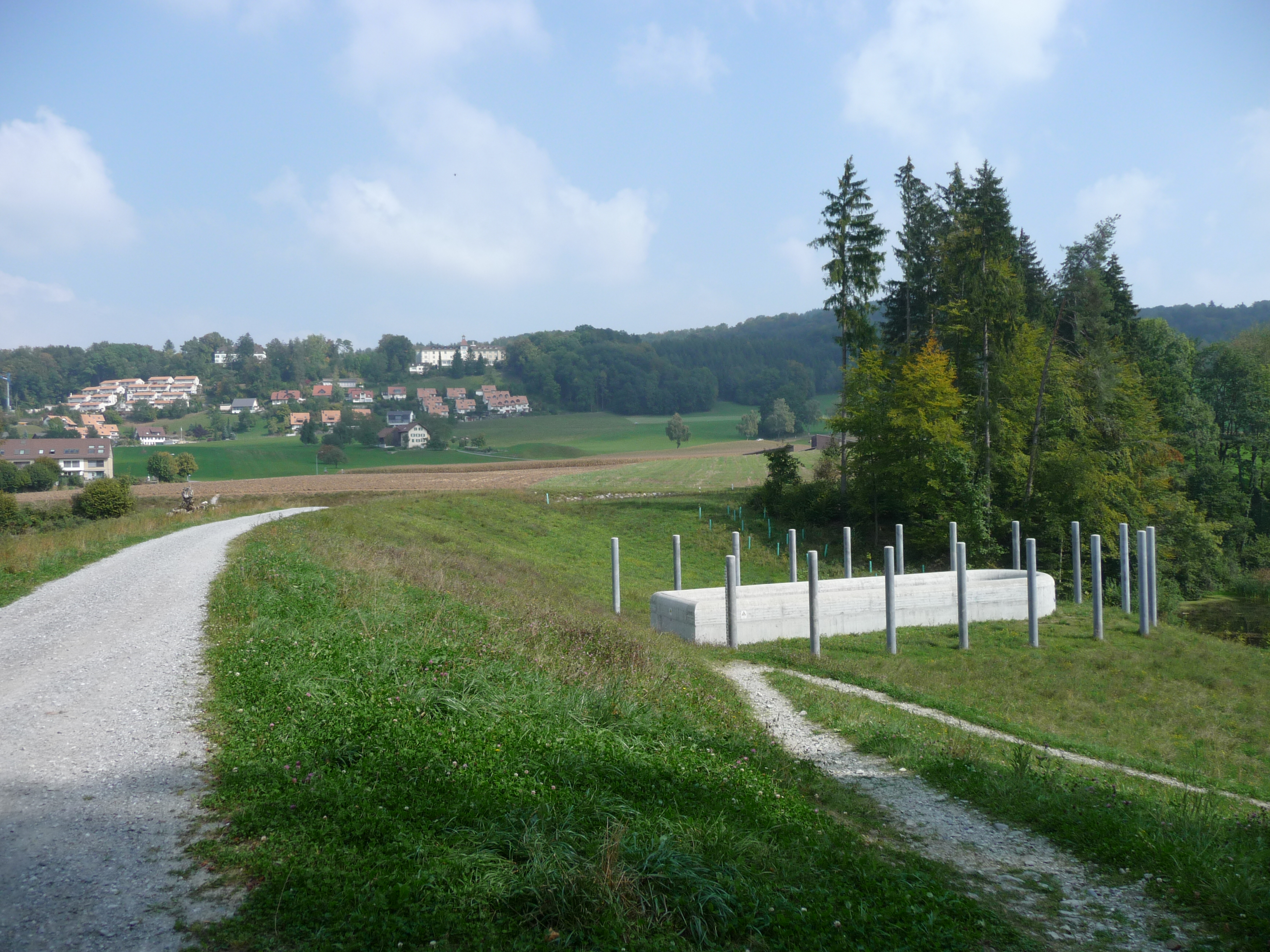
View along the dam crest (7) with lower spillway (2)

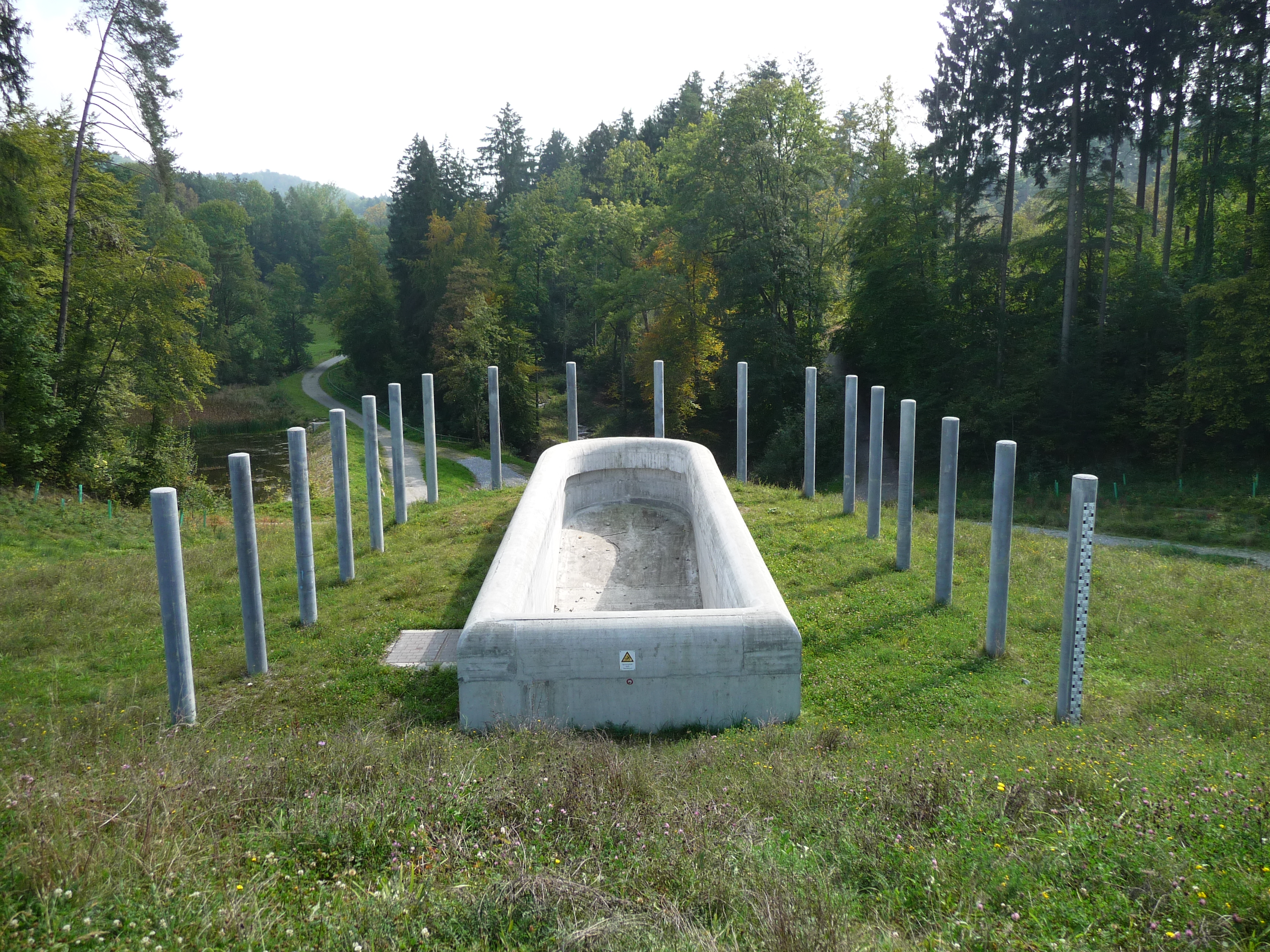
Flood relief (2) with driftwood rake

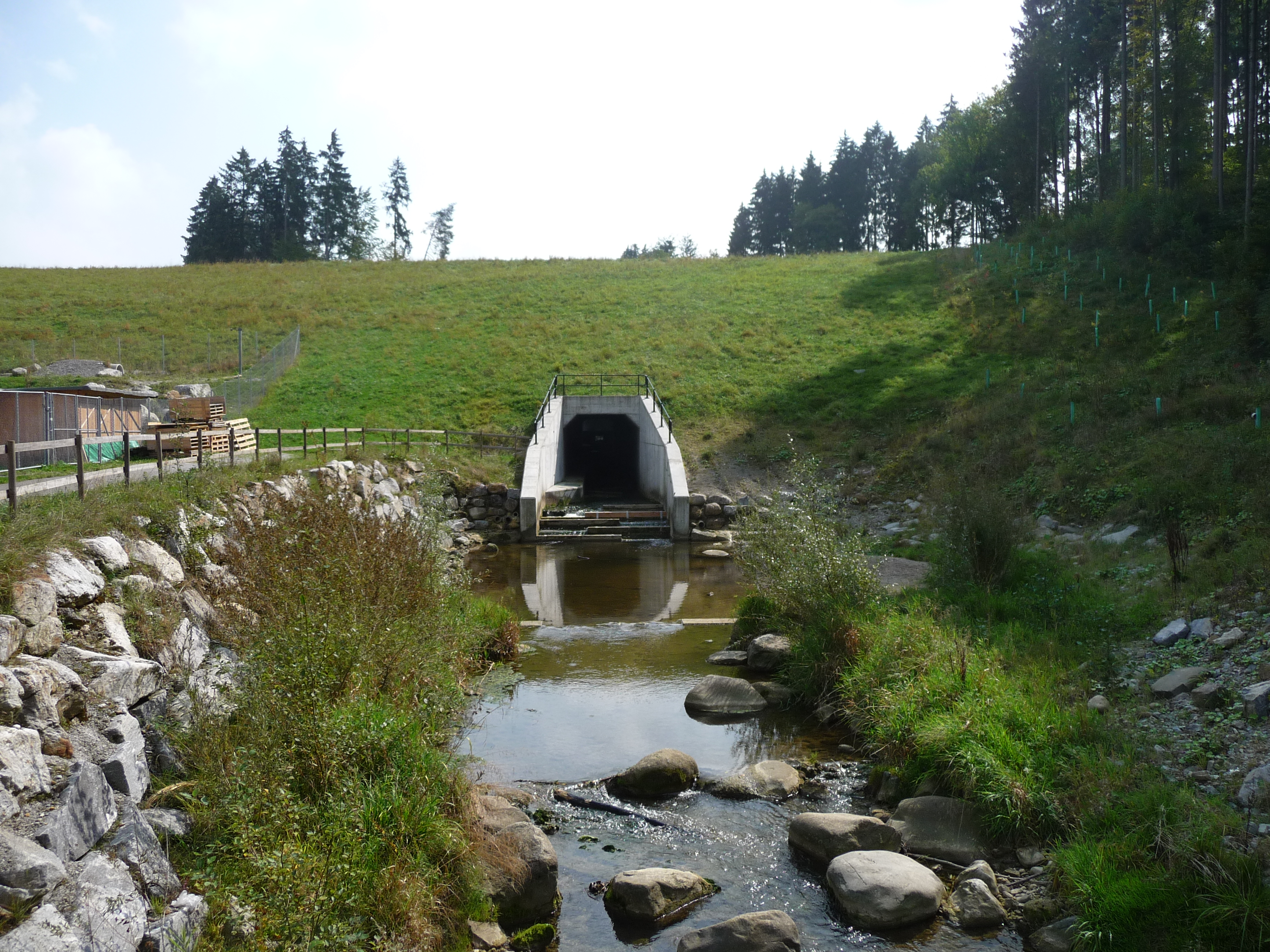
Outlet structure with fish ladder (4) and adjoining stilling basin (5)

== A sequence of the construction measures ==
The construction work for the retention basin commenced with a groundbreaking ceremony on 2 July 2004. The project involved the relocation of a section of approximately 900 meters of Jonentalstraße on the right flank of the valley. Additionally, modifications to the course of the Jonenbach stream were necessary.

Prior to backfilling the dam, a 141-meter-long culvert (1) was built in the central part of the dam to accommodate the Jonenbach. This concrete culvert was built in stages of 7.5 meters in length, with an outer diameter of approximately four by five meters. This was followed by the spillway (2), also made of concrete, with the almost 17-meter-high, shaft-shaped inlet structure that opens into the culvert. The intermediate space below the spillway was underpinned with concrete. Finally, the earthen embankment with a dam volume of 123,000 cubic meters was backfilled. The fill material for this was supplied in part from the nearby N4 construction site in Knonaueramt.

During excavation, a highly fissured sandstone layer was unexpectedly discovered in the area of the left abutment. This deviation from the original detailed project necessitated additional grouting measures.

The construction work was undertaken by Strabag and was completed in May 2007. The project was commissioned by the Construction Directorate of the Canton of Zurich. The total cost of the flood retention basin, including the necessary relocation of Jonentalstraße and adaptation work on Aeugsterstraße, amounted to approximately 13 million Swiss francs (approximately 8.5 million euros). The structure was officially presented to the public on 24 May 2008.

== Nature conservation considerations ==
The basin above the flood retention dam is rarely dammed and only for short periods of time. It typically fills and empties within a few hours to a maximum of one day. This limited water retention duration ensures that the basin's vegetation remains unaffected. However, the construction of a retention basin does disrupt the natural dynamics of the watercourse and sediment transport. Over the long term, this can potentially lead to bed erosion downstream and subsequently cause blockages, as well as reduce structural diversity. Investigations of the bedload balance commissioned by the Construction Directorate of the Canton of Zurich in 2014 confirm a permeability of the retention basin in normal years, while large floods can result in a retention of about 100 m³ per event.

The lowest area of the basin, located directly in front of the dam wall, is regularly flooded during minor floods. Therefore, it was designed as a purely natural area. The Mülweiher, a pond in this area, is fed by a weir in the Jonenbach located above the pond. Since this weir is not passable for fish and microorganisms, an additional bypass watercourse was created at the weir. Furthermore, a fish ladder was installed at the outlet structure of the dam, allowing fish and microorganisms to move upstream in the Jonenbach.

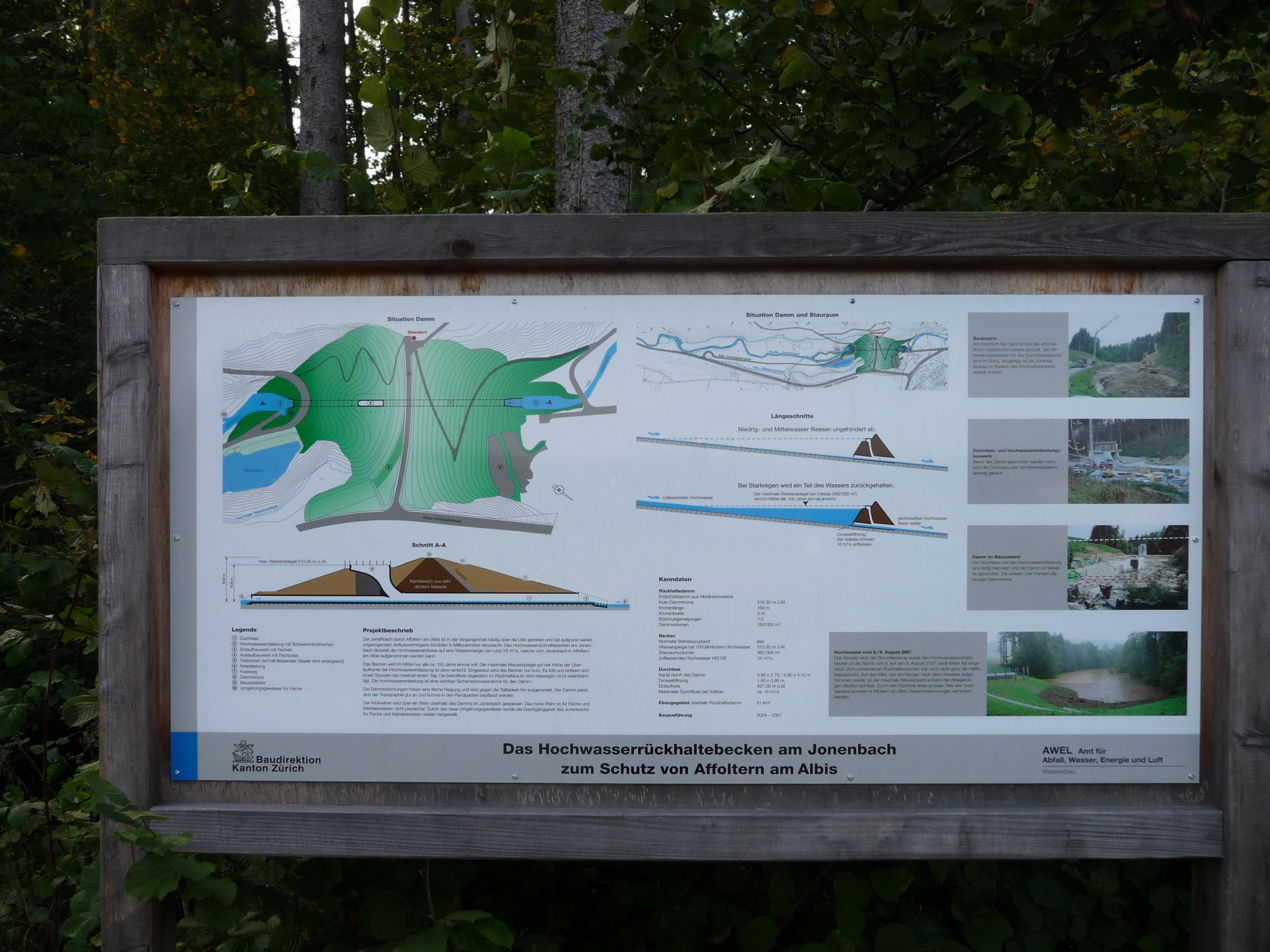
Information board at the flood protection basin

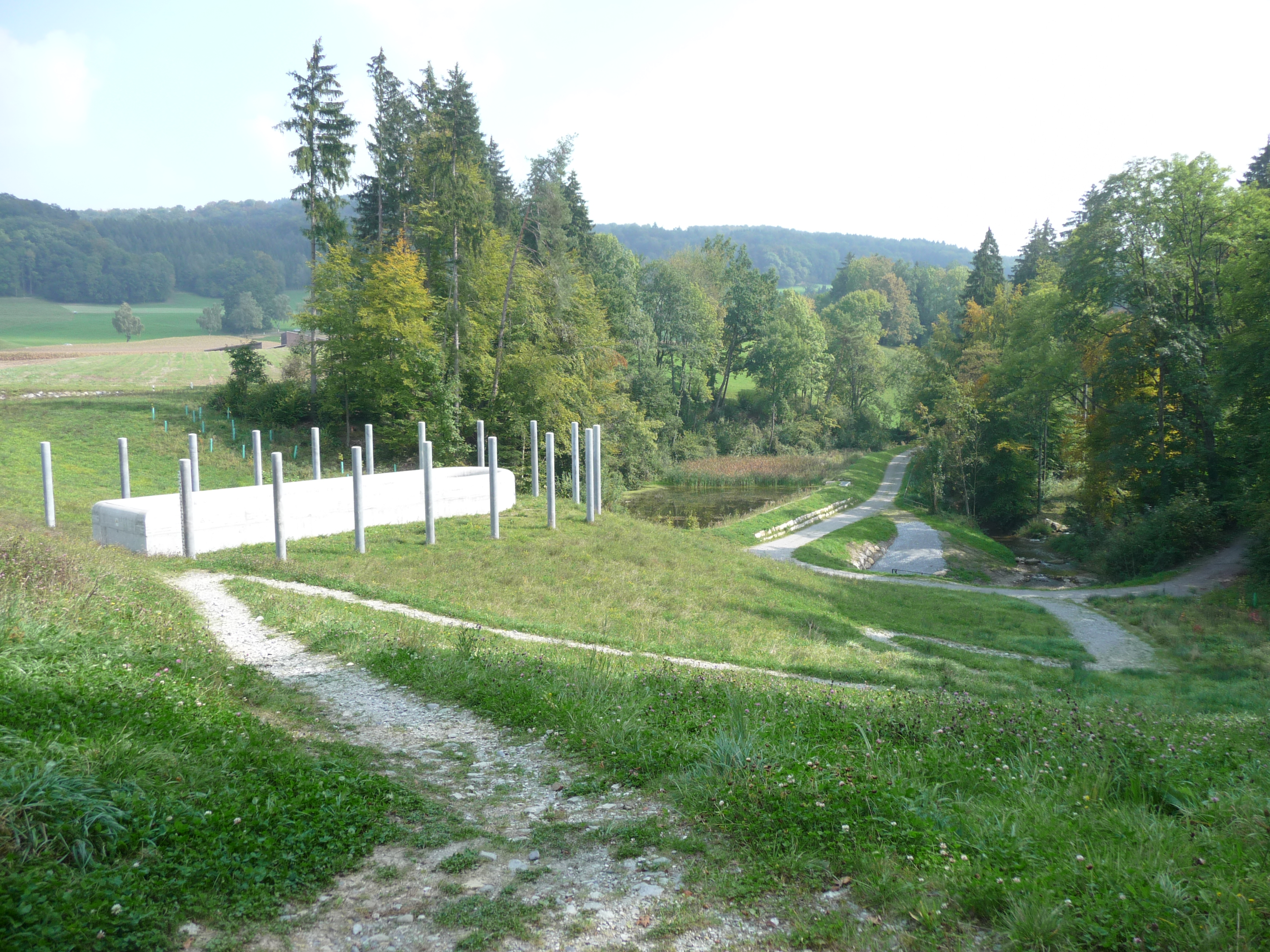
View from the dam of the 'green' basin with Mülweiher

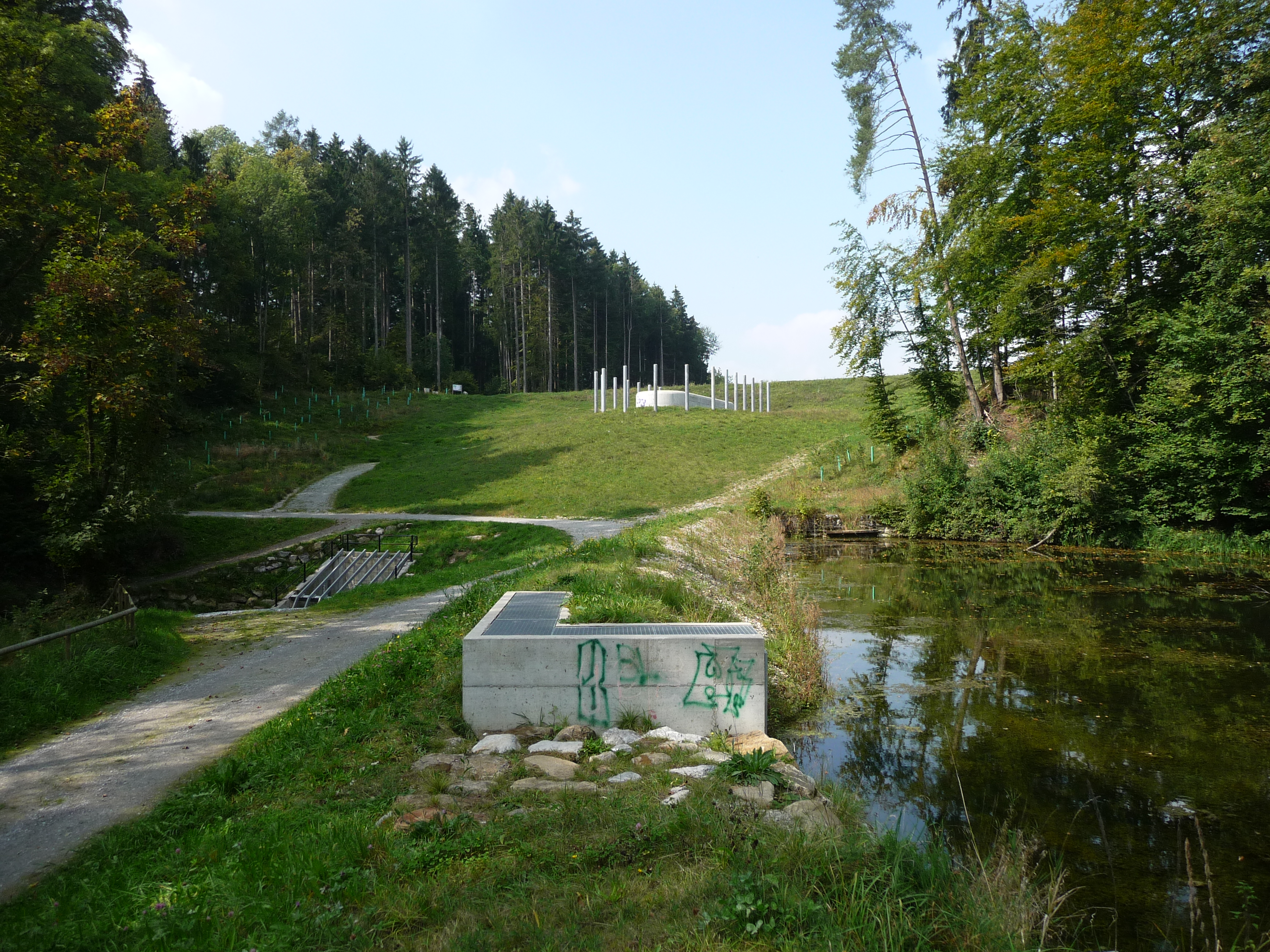
View from the Mülweiher on the dam

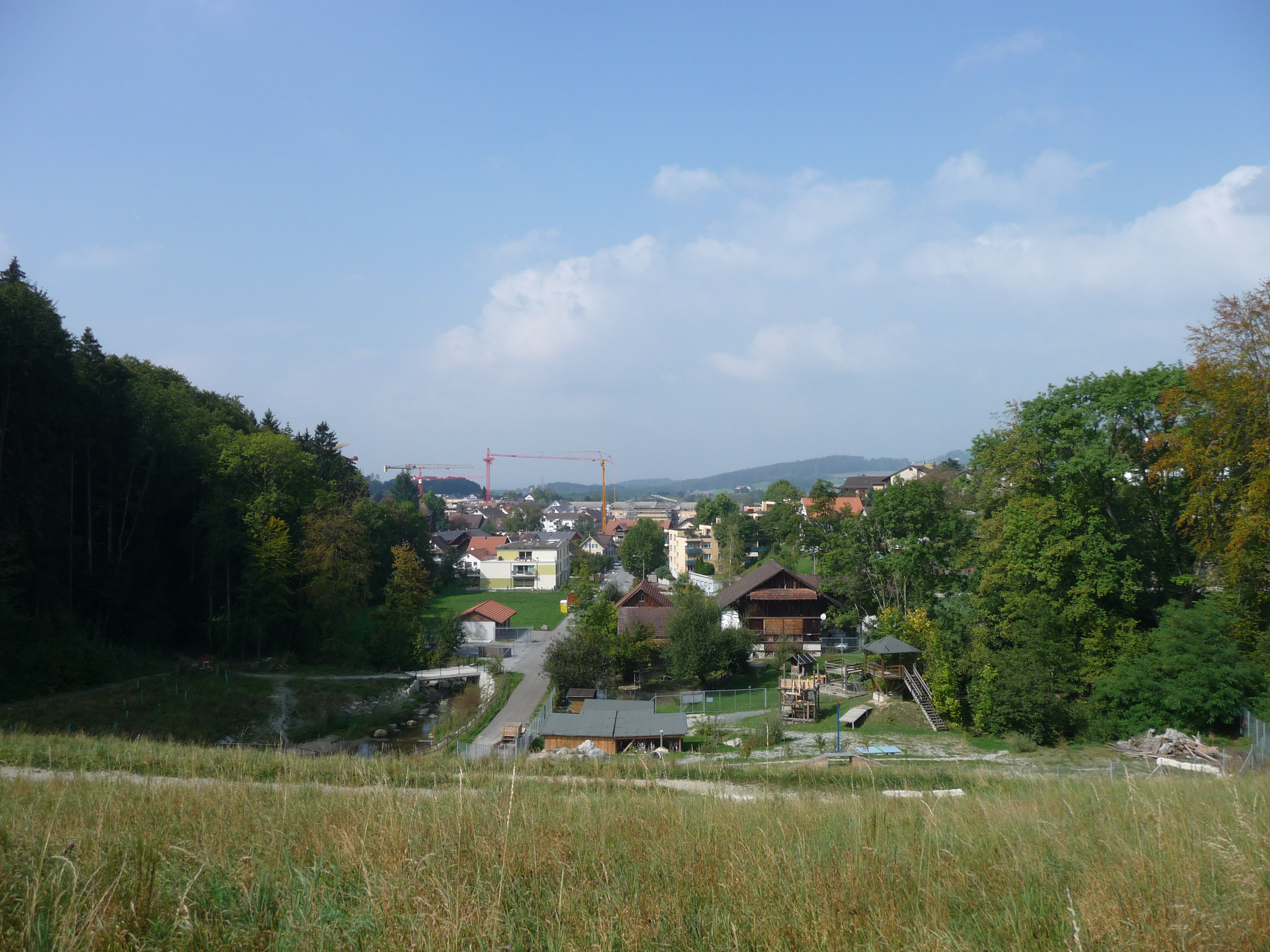
View from the dam to the municipality of Affoltern (with playground)

== Flood control after commissioning ==
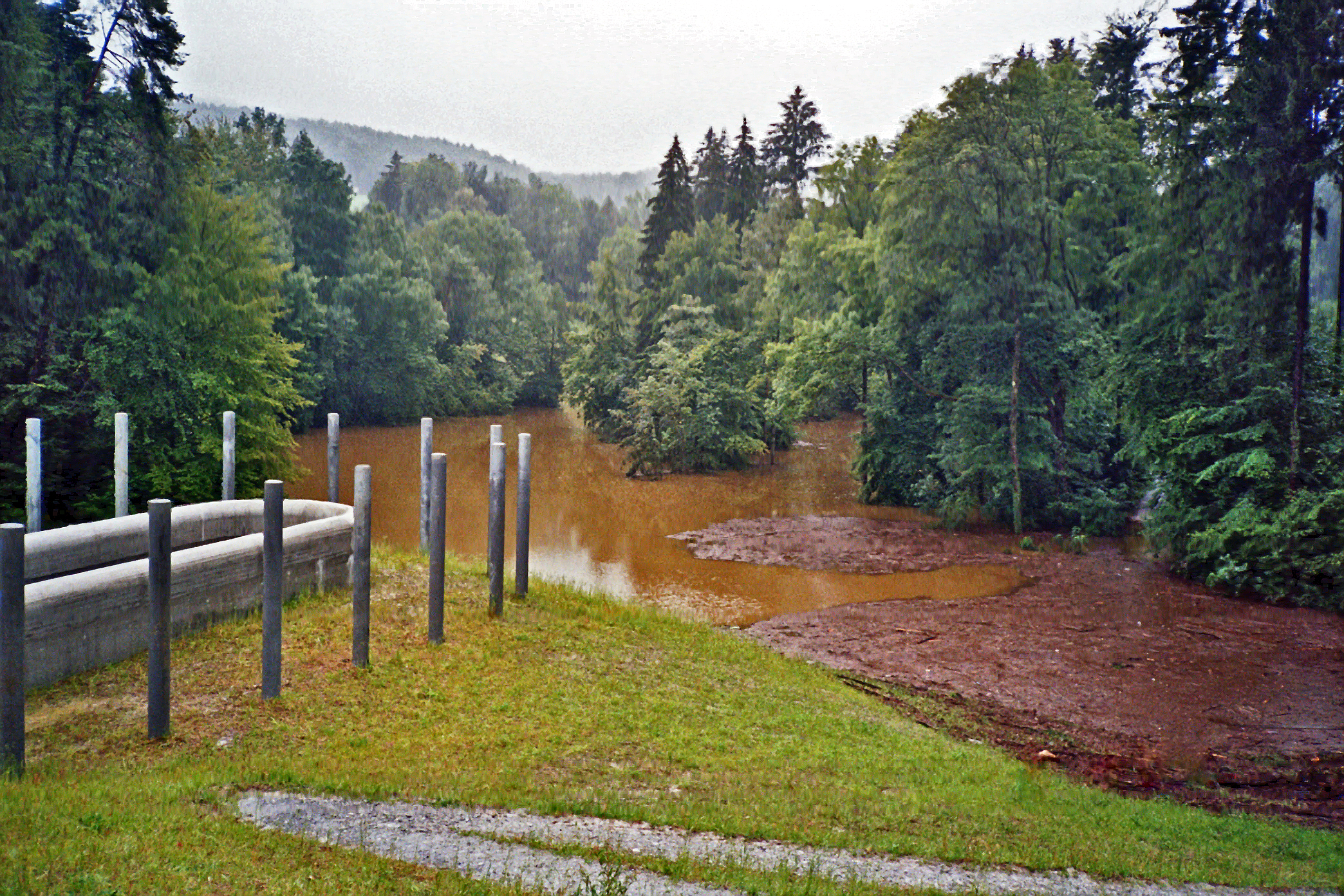
Partially filled pool after heavy rain (8 August 2007)

The region experienced a flood on 8 and 9 August 2007, which occurs only once in 60 to 70 years. During these two consecutive days, the basin received a total rainfall of 80 to 130 mm. The soils were already partially saturated from previous rainfall, causing surface runoff to occur. Within a few hours, the basin was filled to nearly half of its capacity, and the water level rose to 4.35 meters below the overflow edge of the spillway. At this retention, the discharge was throttled from 24 cubic meters to 14 cubic meters per second, preventing flooding in the settlement area downstream of the basin and minimizing the presence of mud and floating debris.

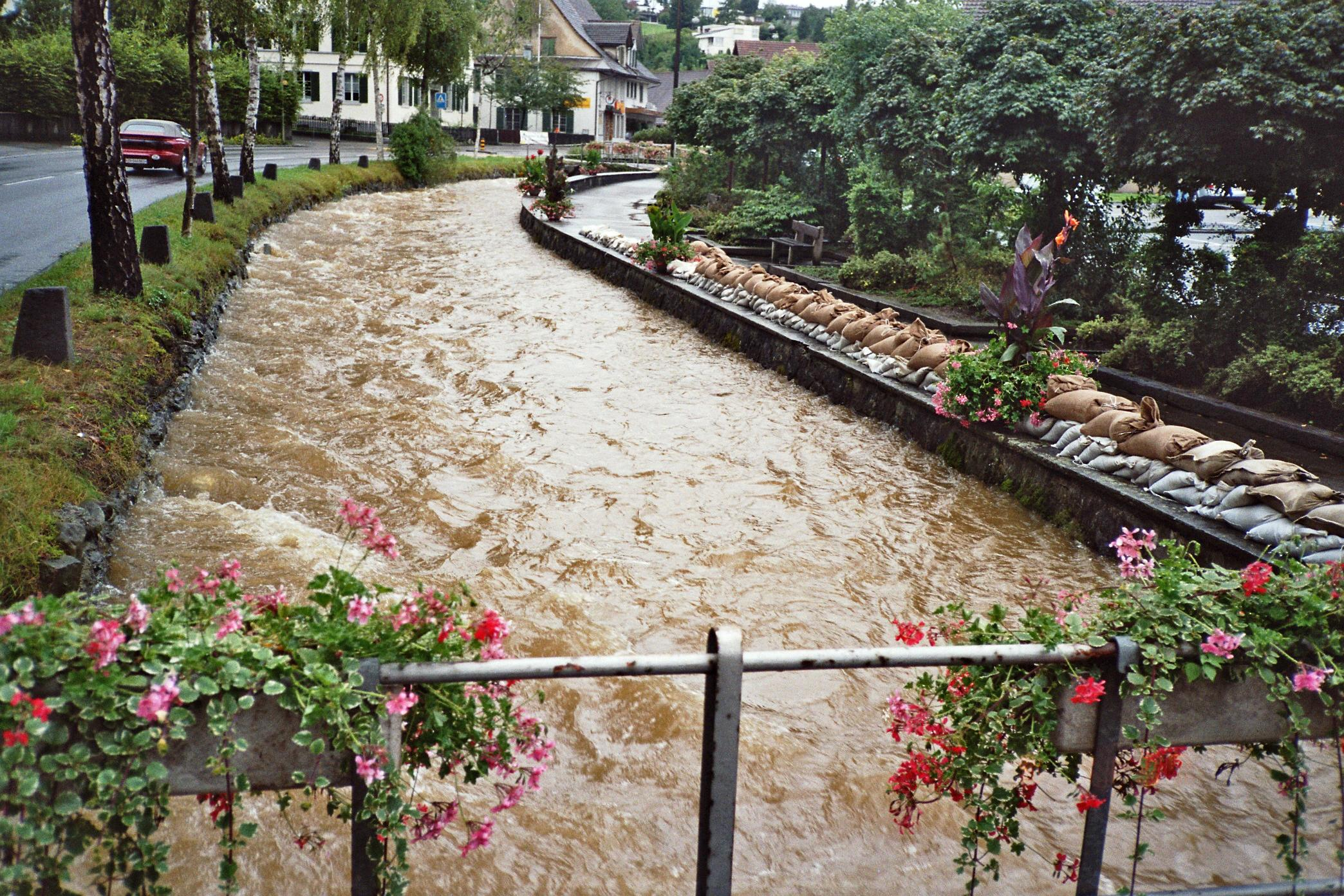
Flood situation in the village below the dam (9 August 2007)

The event documentation of the Office for Waste, Water, Energy, and Air shows: "This runoff could be discharged without damage in the settlement area of Affoltern, only at the pedestrian bridge near the optician's store Büchi (Alte Dorfstraße) an overflow could only be prevented with additional measures of the fire department in the form of sandbags. Therefore, the discharge capacity of the channel in the settlement area is practically exhausted with a discharge of 14 m3/s. However, if the HRB [HRB=High Water Retention Basin] Affoltern am Albis had been fully dammed, around 2 m3/s more would have flowed off, which would have led to overflowing in the current channel. For this reason, the throttle opening at the HRB was temporarily reduced after the event, so that a maximum of 14 m3/s will flow in the future, even with full impoundment."

Furthermore, the same report states: "In the event documentation, the channel capacity in the settlement area was also assessed. [...] Even with a discharge of just under 12 m3/s (at the time of the inspection), 6 of the 28 cross-sections examined had insufficient freeboard and a further 7 had insufficient freeboard. Local construction measures with low effort to increase the discharge capacity are recommended. In Zwillikon, slight flooding occurred, which did not cause any major damage. The known bottlenecks will be eliminated in the medium term. Only then should the throttle opening be set again as in the 2007 flood."

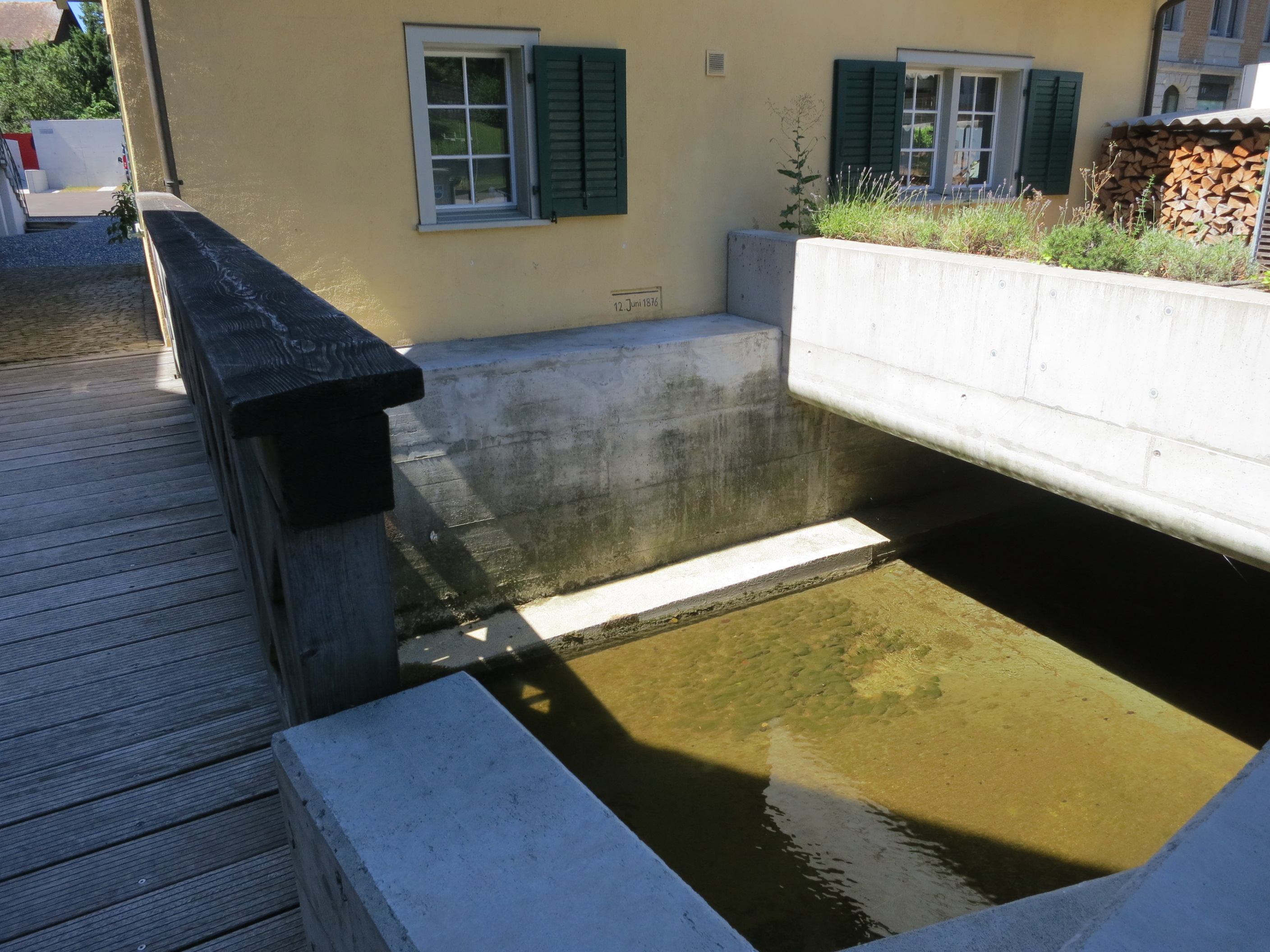
Flood mark of 12 July 1876 in Affoltern

As a result of the flood, a new stream was formed within the area of the retention basin, causing significant damage to the surrounding forest as it carved out a new path.

The effectiveness of the detention basin in providing protection was once again demonstrated during the subsequent April 2008 flood, although the magnitude of this flood was lower than that of 2007.

== See also ==
- Retention basin
