= Dr. T, Lone Star Vet =

American television series

- Genre: Reality Documentary
- Directed by: Dean Bushala
- Starring: Lauren Thielen; (see cast)
- Narrated by: Chris Payne Gilbert
- Country of origin: United States
- Original language: English
- No. of seasons: 1
- No. of episodes: 8

Production
- Executive producers: Pamela Caragol; Richard Dowlearn; Ashley Hoppin; Guy Nickerson; Daysun Perkins; Elaine Pugliese
- Producers: Matt Blatchley; Courtney Bunch; Dean Bushala; Robin Cohen; Ashley Lorenzo Feldman; Marquis Grant; Brianne MacNeil; A. Christine Maxfield; Julie Podolsky; Laura Waechter
- Camera setup: Multiple
- Production company: Spectrum Field Productions

Original release
- Network: Nat Geo Wild
- Release: October 13, 2019 – present

Dr. T, Lone Star Vet is an American television series on the Nat Geo Wild network. It premiered on October 13, 2019, and follows Lauren Thielen, the titular Dr. T, and the veterinarians and staff of the Texas Avian & Exotic Animal Hospital located in Grapevine, Texas.

The show's Dr. T was previously featured on the Nat Geo Wild show titled Dr. K's Exotic Animal ER, before leaving to open her own clinic in her home state.

== Cast ==
=== Veterinarians ===
- Dr. Lauren Thielen, Diplomate ABVP (Avian Practice) ("Dr. T.")
- Dr. Caeley Melmed, D.V.M., Internal Medicine
- Dr. Bruce Nixon, D.V.M., Practice Manager
- Dr. Georgia Altom, D.V.M., Emergency Veterinarian
- Dr. Tannetjė Crocker, Emergency Veterinarian
- Dr. Alyssa Freeman, D.V.M., Emergency Veterinarian
- Dr. Megan Turner, D.V.M., Chief of Medicine
- Dr. Debra Nossaman, D.V.M., FAVD, DAVDC, Veterinary Dentist
- Dr. Quentin Brands, D.V.M., Emergency Veterinarian
- Dr. Nick Di Girolamo, D.V.M.
- Dr. Libby Ramirez, D.V.M., Chief of Operations
- Dr. Katherine Wells, D.V.M., Veterinary Surgeon
- Dr. Jacqueline Gimmler, D.V.M., Veterinary Dermatologist

=== Veterinary staff ===
- Maryanne Farmer, Lead Veterinary Technician
- Tonya Green, Veterinary Technician
- Courtney Mixon, Veterinary Technician

=== Narrator ===
- Chris Payne Gilbert

== Episodes ==
Season	Episodes	Originally released	
Season	Episodes	First released	Last released
1	8	October 13, 2019	December 1, 2019

=== Season 1 (2019) ===
No. overall	No. in season	Title	Original release date
1	1	"The Terrible Turkey Trot"	October 13, 2019
A hedgehog is up for a tooth extraction; a Timneh African Grey has a growth on her throat; a Russian tortoise has digestive issues; an orphaned opossum needs some TLC; an aggressive turkey needs to learn some manners.
2	2	"Mother of Dragons"	October 20, 2019
Dr. T helps a red-ear slider turtle; a bearded dragon has some egg issues; a cockatiel needs an emergency leg amputation; and a guinea pig is seen for losing her hair.
3	3	"Bunny 911"	October 27, 2019
Dr. T sees an itchy scarlet macaw, a bearded dragon with rich taste, a Flemish giant rabbit with a serious medical issues, and a pair of baby sugar gliders.
4	4	"T and the Family Turtle"	November 3, 2019
Dr. T treats her sister's sinking red-ear slider turtle, an Amazon parrot with a swollen eye, a Holland lop rabbit with labor issues, while a gecko fights for its life.
5	5	"Fishin' Impossible"	November 10, 2019
Dr. T gets friendly with a fish, cheers up a chinchilla, and biopsies an adorable bunny.
6	6	"Pain in the Chinchilla"	November 17, 2019
A bunny with sniffles; and a chinchilla with a toothache.
7	7	"The Roo to Recovery"	November 24, 2019
Treating a traumatized tegu, a kangaroo and a bunny without an appetite.
8	8	"Big Bird, Big Problem"	December 1, 2019
Dr. T sees a big bird with a big problem and a hedgehog with mysterious lumps.
