= Urban fishing =

Type of recreational fishing

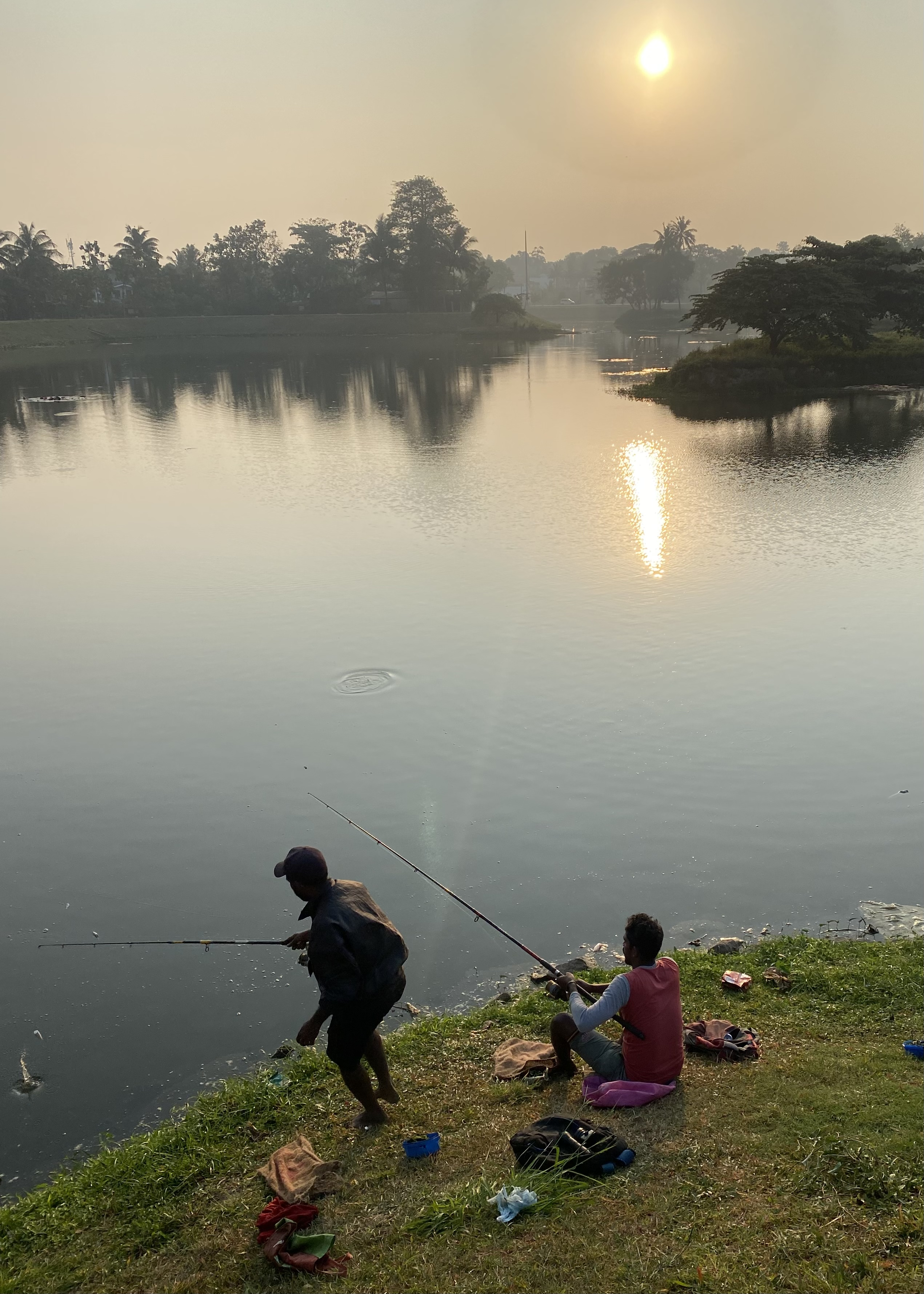
Urban fishing

Urban fishing is a type of recreational fishing that takes place in urban areas such as inner cities.

The United States Federal Government began urban fishing programs in 1969 during civil unrest in cities throughout the country. It launched the program in six cities, including St. Louis, Missouri, which is one of the largest programs in existence in the U.S. Several states run urban fishing programs where they stock ponds and lakes for anglers.

Sewer fishing is a type of urban fishing where anglers attempt to catch fish from storm sewers. Fish wind up in sewers from flooding that takes place from nearby lakes and streams, causing fish to swim to and from the bodies of water. Sewer fishing was documented in the 2018 Nat Geo Wild television series Fish My City.

== Risks of urban fishing ==
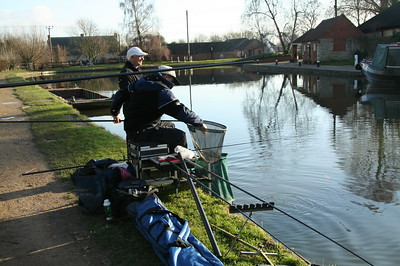
Fishermen on a canal using a fishing rod and net

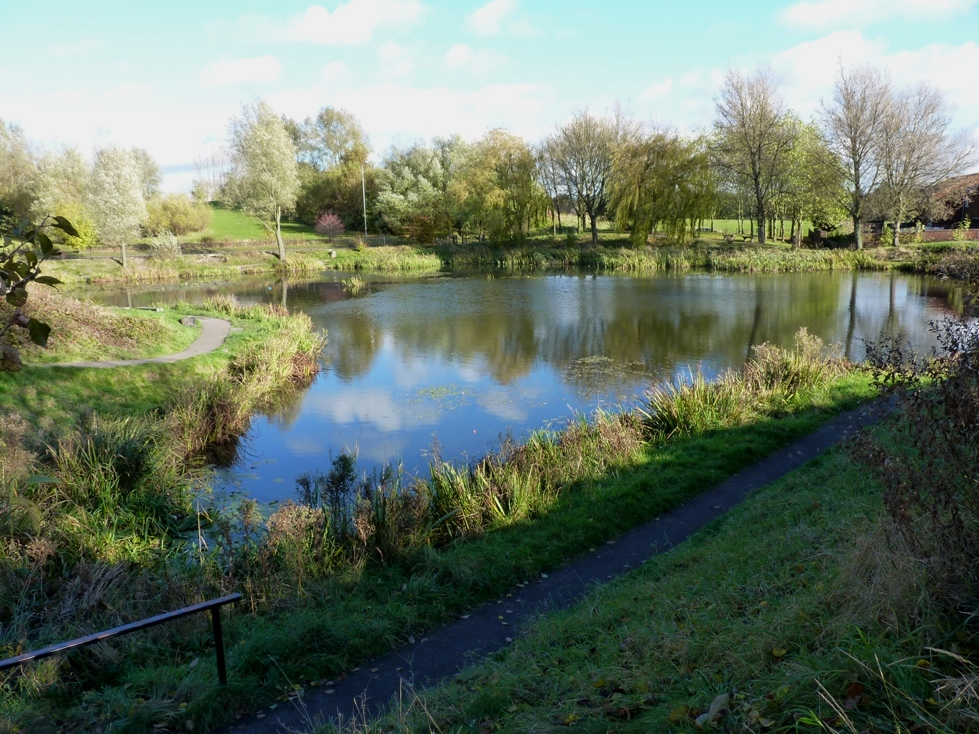
An urban fishing pond

Pollution in urban waterways produces a risk for fishers when their purpose for fishing is consumption. Throughout multiple rivers in the United States, carcinogens and hazardous chemicals such as mercury, dieldrin, and polychlorinated biphenyls have been found in native fish populations including the striped bass and the longnose gar. Due to the chemical composure of PCBs, it takes years to breakdown and particles persist in the food chain long after their initial introduction into the ecosystem.

While the Clean Water Act has led to improved efforts to regulate contaminants in waterways, the water must have a recognized purpose for mandatory testing. Some of the challenges presented by pollutants entering aquatic ecosystems can be lessened by finding an alternative to or limiting the use of pesticides that can enter an ecosystem through run-off and finding alternatives to reduce the amount of single use plastics that can pose hazards to aquatic life.

== See also ==
- Fishing techniques
- Tailrace fishing
