= Fish My City =

Television series

- Genre: Television series
- Presented by: Michael Iaconelli
- Original language: English
- No. of seasons: 1
- No. of episodes: 6

Original release
- Network: Nat Geo Wild
- Release: present

Fish My City is a six part television series by Nat Geo Wild. It is hosted by Michael Iaconelli and documents urban fishing in various locations throughout the world.
