= Man v. Monster =

- Genre: Nature documentary
- Starring: Richard Terry
- Country of origin: United Kingdom
- No. of series: 3
- No. of episodes: 16

Production
- Running time: 60 minutes

Original release
- Network: Nat Geo Wild
- Release: 6 June 2011 – 25 May 2013

Man v. Monster is a British documentary television series broadcast on Nat Geo Wild, which follows adventurer and cinematographer Richard Terry as he travels back in time to faraway jungles and remote islands in search of the truth behind stories of unknown creatures attacking, and killing, humans. In the Amazon rainforest, Terry is on the trail of a huge spider said to be attacking villagers; in southern Mexico, reports of a terrifying creature that attacks locals at night sends Terry into the jungles of Chiapas to investigate; and in the Indonesian archipelago, Terry island hops to expose a giant, blood-thirsty reptile that preys on livestock and humans. He also visits India, Tanzania, and Thailand.

== Reception ==
In his review of Man v. Monster, Brad Newsome of The Age wrote, "These monster-hunting shows just keep getting dumber and more disingenuous." He said that it was "essentially impossible" for the presenter to try to find a spider of sufficient size to pluck children out of their beds.

== Series overview ==
Series	Episodes	Originally aired	
Series	Episodes	First aired	Last aired
1	3	6 June 2011	6 August 2011
2	6	28 October 2012	7 December 2012
3	7	2 January 2013	25 May 2013

== Episodes ==
=== Series 1 (2011) ===
No.	Title	Original release date	
1	1	"Cold-Blooded Killers"	6 June 2011
A mysterious reptile has been killing people in Indonesia. Mysterious animal : Komodo dragon
2	2	"Amazon Terror"	13 June 2011
A giant eight-legged creature in the Amazon Rainforest. Mysterious animal : Goliath bird-eating spider
3	3	"Flying Demon"	6 August 2011
A mysterious bat terrorises the Mexico village. Mysterious animal : Vampire bat

=== Series 2 (2012) ===
No.	Title	Original release date	
4	1	"African Werewolf"	28 October 2012
Werewolf-like killings in Tanzania. Mysterious animal : African lion
5	2	"Mekong Flesh-Eater"	2 November 2012
Aquatic attacks in Thailand. Mysterious animal : Giant freshwater stingray
6	3	"Man-Eating Menace"	9 November 2012
Bengal tiger attacks in Eastern India. Mysterious animal : Bengal tiger
7	4	"Winged Assassin"	16 November 2012
A flying creature in Indonesia attacks humans. mysterious animal : Large flying fox
8	5	"Amazon River Beast"	30 November 2012
The Brazilian Amazon may hold a creature of immense size.
9	6	"Brazilian Bigfoot"	7 December 2012
A tall shaggy beast in the Amazon.

=== Series 3 (2013) ===
No.	Title	Original release date	
10	1	"Episode 1"	2 January 2013
11	2	"Episode 2"	9 January 2013
12	3	"Episode 3"	16 January 2013
13	4	"Episode 4"	23 January 2013
14	5	"Episode 5"	30 January 2013
15	6	"Episode 6"	6 February 2013
16	7	"Invasion of the Mutant Pig"	25 May 2013
Aggressive, wild pigs in Texas.
