= Dr. K's Exotic Animal ER =

American television series

- Genre: Reality Documentary
- Directed by: Guy Nickerson
- Starring: Susan Kelleher; (see cast)
- Narrated by: Art Edmonds; Josh Goodman
- Country of origin: United States
- Original language: English
- No. of seasons: 9
- No. of episodes: 87

Production
- Executive producers: Geoff Daniels; Ashley Lorenzo Feldman; Ryan Glidden; Krystal Stevens; Ashley Hoppin; Guy Nickerson; Elaine Pulgiese; Stephen Pettinger; Jaymee Johnson; Tracy Rudolph; Lisa Tanzer
- Producers: Alycia Christodoulou; Jacob Akira Okada; Matthew James Williams
- Editor: Bill Brown
- Camera setup: Multiple
- Production company: Spectrum Productions

Original release
- Network: Nat Geo Wild
- Release: October 4, 2014 – March 21, 2021

Dr. K's Exotic Animal ER is an American television series on the Nat Geo Wild network. It premiered on October 4, 2014, and follows Susan Kelleher, the titular Dr. K, and the veterinarians and staff of the Broward Avian and Exotic Animal Hospital located in Deerfield Beach, Florida. An eighth season premiered in September 2019. A separate series, titled Dr. K's Exotic Animal ER: Gloves Off!, premiered in 2016 and consists of enhanced episodes of the original series.

The show's Dr. Lauren Thielen received her own Nat Geo Wild show titled Dr. T, Lone Star Vet, which premiered in October 2019.

== Cast ==
=== Veterinarians ===
- Dr. Susan Kelleher D.V.M. ("Dr. K.")
- Dr. Veronica Pardini, D.V.M.
- Dr. Carlos Salvioli, Invited D.V.M.
- Dr. Lauren Thelien

=== Veterinary staff ===
- Jasmine Sommers, Office Manager
- Dyanne Velasquez, Certified Veterinary Technician
- Kristin Runkle, Veterinary Technician

=== Narrators ===
- Art Edmonds
- Alex Quenga
- Josh Goodman

== Episodes ==
Season	Episodes	Originally released	
Season	Episodes	First released	Last released
1	6	October 4, 2014	November 8, 2014
2	8	October 3, 2015	November 21, 2015
3	8	May 21, 2016	July 9, 2016
4	10	April 22, 2017	June 24, 2017
5	10	March 18, 2018	May 20, 2018
6	12	September 9, 2018	November 25, 2018
7	12	February 24, 2019	May 12, 2019
8	11	September 2, 2019	December 6, 2019
9	10	January 11, 2021	March 22, 2021

=== Season 1 (2014) ===
No. overall	No. in season	Title	Original release date
1	1	"Bunny Nose Job"	October 4, 2014
Dr. K performs surgery on a rabbit, prairie dog, and a parrot.
2	2	"A Bad Case of Rotten Eggs"	October 11, 2014
A tortoise who cannot lay its eggs is assisted. Later, the animal hospital staff cares for a hedgehog and a corn snake.
3	3	"Into the Fox Hole"	October 18, 2014
Dr. K operates on a chameleon who is bound up with eggs. Also: A Fennec fox with anal issues; a couple of guinea pigs with weight issues; and a parrot with sinus problems.
4	4	"Leave It to Lemur"	October 25, 2014
Dr. Thielen is left to manage the patients at the animal hospital while Dr. K is away at a conference. Included: A lemur with a broken toe; a chicken with a prolapsed cloaca; and a guinea pig with an itching problem.
5	5	"Pot-Bellied Pig Out"	November 1, 2014
Animals treated include a 6-year-old guinea pig suffering seizures; a lethargic ferret with a fever; and a cockatiel bleeding from the mouth. Also, a woman must say goodbye to a cherished pet.
6	6	"Kink-achoo!"	November 8, 2014
Dr. K gives a marmoset a checkup. Elsewhere, a growth is found on a rabbit's uterus and wild birds are treated.

=== Season 2 (2015) ===
No. overall	No. in season	Title	Original release date
7	1	"Sir Lynx-a-lot"	October 3, 2015
Animals treated include a stressed-out 10-year-old Eurasian lynx; a ball python that was attacked by a feeder rat; a rescued cockatiel that needs help laying an egg; and a recently neutered pot-bellied pig continues to heal.
8	2	"Chinchillin' Like a Villain"	October 10, 2015
A dog attacks a hedgehog and breaks its leg, while a life-or-death situation arises with a 9-year-old chinchilla with diarrhea.
9	3	"Turtle-Necked"	October 17, 2015
Animals treated include a sulcata tortoise with a mass on its neck; a 9-year-old chinchilla bleeding from the mouth; a therapy chicken with a lame leg; and a pot-bellied pig on a diet undergoes a weight-loss test.
10	4	"Sticky Pixie and Trixie Too!"	October 24, 2015
Tension runs high with the arrival of many critical patients, including two sugar gliders that got tangled in a blanket, a cockatiel that flew into a flytrap, and a bunny with an obstruction in her stomach.
11	5	"One Fat Parakeet"	October 31, 2015
Animals treated include a bleeding cockatiel, a skunk that needs to be spayed, two panther chameleons in for a checkup, a 9-year-old ferret with quality-of-life issues and a quaker parakeet with a tumor. Also, a gerbil with an abscess and a boa constrictor with a mouth wound.
12	6	"Let Me Clear My Goat"	November 7, 2015
A pet goat with kidney stones undergoes two operations; a baby macaw with a genetic bone disorder is treated; and a procedure is done on a guinea pig with an eye injury.
13	7	"H2O No!"	November 14, 2015
Two goldfish have mobility issues; a severe macaw has a serious bite wound on its foot; a rabbit requires exploratory surgery for fluid in the abdomen; a tiny yellow-bellied slider may have pneumonia; and a ferret has tumor on its tail.
14	8	"Major Hissing Fit"	November 21, 2015
A pot-bellied pig has an obstruction in her stomach; a salomon boa presents with a respiratory infection; a black swan is hit by a car; a 5-year-old ferret is diagnosed with a fatal pancreatic cancer; a turtle must lay 12 eggs to avoid surgery.

=== Season 3 (2016) ===
No. overall	No. in season	Title	Original release date
15	1	"Sumo Dragon"	May 21, 2016
Dr. K treats a bleeding Sumo Dragon. Later, she examines a macaw with a mass and a pregnant marmoset.
16	2	"Wibbly Wobbly Hedgehog"	May 28, 2016
Dr. K helps a giant lethargic rabbit, an anemic red-shouldered hawk and a wobbly hedgehog.
17	3	"The Tortoise and the Dog"	June 4, 2016
Dr. K examines a monkey and a guinea pig. Elsewhere, an injured tortoise is treated by Dr. G.
18	4	"Operation Skunk"	June 11, 2016
Dr. K works to save two Amazon parrots who were attacked by a dog. Later, a ferret in poor health is examined and dehydrated sugar glider is treated.
19	5	"Snake, Rattle & Roll"	June 18, 2016
A python with a respiratory infection is treated.
20	6	"Serious Monkey Business"	June 25, 2016
A CT scan is performed on a marmoset. Also, a six-year-old skunk is examined and a rabbit with a broken leg is treated.
21	7	"Gator-aid"	July 2, 2016
A growth is found on the leg of a 35-year-old parrot.
22	8	"Lizard of Oz"	July 9, 2016
A bloated dwarf rabbit is treated. Later, Dr. K examines a blue and gold macaw with an eye problem before visiting a local elementary school.

=== Season 4 (2017) ===
No. overall	No. in season	Title	Original release date
23	1	"Baby Kangaroo Alert!"	April 22, 2017
A desert tortoise needs life-saving surgery; a male prairie dog has a little problem down below; and a bunny has a major issue with his anesthesia.
24	2	"One Funky Monkey"	April 29, 2017
A newborn owl monkey has swollen fingers from getting his mother's hair tightly wound around them; an opossum's owners are concerned about her inflamed anal glands; a 4-month-old female coyote comes in for a wellness exam.
25	3	"Eye-Eye-Ay!"	May 6, 2017
A lemur comes in to be spayed; a rabbit gets a CT scan; a koi with a mass is examined.
26	4	"Gettin' Squirrely"	May 13, 2017
A squirrel travels hundreds of miles just to see Dr. K; a goat has serious udder trouble; and a vet tech's bunny needs help.
27	5	"Return of the Dragon"	May 20, 2017
Dr. K treats a macaw with a broken wing; a bearded dragon is rushed in as an emergency.
28	6	"Hubble Trouble"	May 27, 2017
A crested gecko is attacked by the family dog.
29	7	"Pain in the Beak"	June 3, 2017
Dr. T and Dyanne examine a male peacock.
30	8	"Prairie Dog Companion"	June 10, 2017
A prairie dog that mysteriously lost its top teeth is examined.
31	9	"Jelly Bellies"	June 17, 2017
Plump pets that need to shed some pounds are examined.
32	10	"Frenemy Freak Outs!"	June 24, 2017
Animals fight for their lives after attacks by outsiders and their own kind.

=== Season 5 (2018) ===
No. overall	No. in season	Title	Original release date
33	1	"Two Heads Are Better Than One"	March 18, 2018
A client brings in a baby snake with two heads.
34	2	"Sushi Eating Squirrel Monkey"	March 25, 2018
The staff treats a sushi-eating squirrel monkey; a cockatiel; and a pregnant rabbit.
35	3	"A Magic Rabbit Act"	April 1, 2018
The doctors have their hands full with emergency cases involving a tortoise and a goose.
36	4	"Cock-a-doodle don't"	April 8, 2018
Dr. T's bunny suffers a life-threatening illness and is taken into emergency surgery.
37	5	"Pig Improvement"	April 15, 2018
With two emergencies and two surgeries, it is a busy day at Dr. K's clinic.
38	6	"Great Eggspectations"	April 22, 2018
The ER has their hands full with difficult and unusual cases.
39	7	"My Ferret Ate What?"	April 29, 2018
The doctors solve a pigeon's mystery mass and find a foreign object inside a ferret.
40	8	"A Perfect Storm"	May 6, 2018
Dr. K must act quick and perform an emergency surgery on a tortoise crushed by a car.
41	9	"Ferret Freak Out!"	May 13, 2018
A binge-eating pig finds out that what goes down, must come up; a toothache sends Dr. T down a rabbit hole; and a stubborn egg sends a sick chick to the hospital.
42	10	"Call of Doodie!"	May 20, 2018
A macaw with a mysterious mass has Dr. K going beyond the call of duty; and Dr. T gets a visit from a tiny tortoise who lost a fight with a pit bull puppy.

=== Season 6 (2018) ===
No. overall	No. in season	Title	Original release date
43	1	"Hide n' Snake"	September 9, 2018
It's a wild few days as Dr. K and company try to keep control of crazy critters.
44	2	"All's Quail That Ends Well"	September 16, 2018
Dr. K wrestles a pot-bellied pig over a challenging few days.
45	3	"Mighty Mouse"	September 23, 2018
Dr. K and the team host a gender reveal party for a tortoise.
46	4	"A Prickly Problem"	September 30, 2018
Dr. K performs emergency surgery on a baby bird who can't breathe.
47	5	"Rat Boot Touille"	October 7, 2018
A snapping turtle case stumps Dr. K and a hedgehog gives Dr. T the silent treatment.
48	6	"Silly Rabbit..."	October 14, 2018
Dr. K's clinic fills up with mysterious cases, including a sugar glider who isn't eating.
49	7	"Bunny Royale"	October 21, 2018
A bunny is rushed in after a vicious attack and a pig comes in after eating rat poison.
50	8	"Eggs-treme Measures"	October 28, 2018
A baby chicken is missing a wing after an attack and a hedgehog has a bulging eye.
51	9	"How Venus Got Her Groove Back"	November 4, 2018
Dr. K's staff treat an injured turtle and a dehydrated pig.
52	10	"A Reptile Dysfunction!"	November 11, 2018
A lemur and a mouse are treated.
53	11	"To the Rescue!"	November 18, 2018
An abandoned macaw may lose a wing; an opossum has a mysterious lump; and an orphaned bunny needs surgery.
54	12	"It's a Bunnyful Life"	November 25, 2018
Twins bring in their impacted tortoise, a beloved fish has swimming trouble, and Dr. T's rabbit is sick.

=== Season 7 (2019) ===
No. overall	No. in season	Title	Original release date
55	1	"Monkey See, Monkey Boo-Boo"	February 24, 2019
Dr. K helps Marshmallow who is hard up in breathing.
56	2	"Stinkin' Cute"	March 3, 2019
Dr. K treats Buddy.
57	3	"What the Duck?"	March 10, 2019
The team rushes to save a prairie dog with a life-threatening infection.
58	4	"Swan Voyage"	March 17, 2019
It's a day of mystery at the clinic when a bearded dragon suffers a peculiar illness.
59	5	"Cocka tude!"	March 24, 2019
A small ferret has a big problem and a feather-plucking cockatoo has an attitude.
60	6	"Skateboarding Tortoise"	March 31, 2019
The team works to discover why a rabbit is wobbly after getting her head stuck in a cage.
61	7	"Toothless and Ruthless"	April 7, 2019
Mystery cases keep the doctors busy at the clinic when a young snake stops laying eggs.
62	8	"Thinking Outside the Fox"	April 14, 2019
A tegu with tummy trouble; and discovering something out of a routine check-up with a cockatiel.
63	9	"Eye Caramba!"	April 21, 2019
Dr. K tries to save Migi.
64	10	"Easter Bunny Surprise"	April 28, 2019
Lucy the bunny comes in for a growth on her chin, but Dr. K discovers a bigger problem.
65	11	"This Little Piggy..."	May 5, 2019
Adeline, a potbellied pig, scares everyone when she has a sudden seizure.
66	12	"Kinkajou on This!"	May 12, 2019
The staff give bittersweet farewell to a beloved colleague as Dr. T says goodbye.

=== Season 8 (2019) ===
No. overall	No. in season	Title	Original release date
67	1	"Pain in the Cheek"	September 2, 2019
Princess Peach the Hedgehog needs a mini mani-pedi.
68	2	"Some Bunny to Love"	September 8, 2019
A gender-reveal party is held for a young marmoset.
69	3	"Monkey Do, Monkey Don't"	September 15, 2019
Dr. K takes care of a Tamarin monkey that gets injured playing with the family dog.
70	4	"No Harm, No Foul"	September 22, 2019
A chicken with a severe neck wound needs emergency care.
71	5	"Snake Me Home Tonight"	September 29, 2019
A pot-bellied pig throws a temper tantrum while it gets a nail trim.
72	6	"A Mite-y Big Problem"	October 6, 2019
Two baby tortoises visit the vet for the first time.
73	7	"Goodbye Par-T"	October 13, 2019
A review of some of Dr. T's moments before she heads off to her new job in Texas.
74	8	"Lifestyles of the Rich and Famous"	October 20, 2019
Hercules the tortoise is critically ill and Shakira the chicken has a limp.
75	9	"My Pet Squirrel"	October 27, 2019
A squirrel goes to the dentist and a rat gets some boots.
76	10	"Miracle on Dr. K's Street"	December 1, 2019
The pigs keep throwing up; and a savannah cat refuses to eat.
77	11	"Bad for Bunny Business"	December 6, 2019
The pigs keep throwing up; and a savannah cat refuses to eat.

=== Season 9 (2021) ===
No. overall	No. in season	Title	Original release date
78	1	"I Wallaby Your Baby!"	January 10, 2021
An adorable baby wallaby visits the clinic and charms the entire staff.
79	2	"Oui, Oui... Piggie!"	January 17, 2021
It's a busy day for Dr. K and her staff as a duck with a rusty hook in his foot rushes in; a very sick ferret presents losing weight at an alarming rate; and a rabbit with a severely twisted neck has her owners in a panic, all while a pretty pig gets a pedicure.
80	3	"Mini Mouse"	January 24, 2021
A duck is rushed in after being shot; a pig in labor needs immediate attention; and an aging turtle has shell issues.
81	4	"Can't Bite Me Love"	January 31, 2021
A parakeet barely escapes an attack from a cat; A newborn bunny is fighting for its life.
82	5	"This Little Piggie Goes Berserk!"	February 14, 2021
A young monkey has anger issues; a guinea pig has a lump.
83	6	"Band of Bunnies"	February 21, 2021
A bunny arrives in desperate need of blood.
84	7	"Sugar Glider Honey Bunch"	February 28, 2021
Sugar gliders have a slew of unexpected issues.
85	8	"Sick as a Prairie Dog"	March 7, 2021
A prairie dog is anything but perky; a hedgehog with mites.
86	9	"Your Royal Sinus"	March 15, 2021
Dr. K treats a rabbit that has a serious sinus and eye issues.
87	10	"Big Bite, Pig Attitude!"	March 21, 2021
A sassy skunk needs an attitude.
